= List of television stations in Idaho =

This is a list of broadcast television stations that are licensed in the U.S. state of Idaho.

== Full-power ==
- Stations are arranged by media market served and channel position.

Full-power television stations in Idaho
Media market	Station	Channel	Primary affiliation(s)	Notes	Refs
Boise	KBOI-TV	2	CBS, The CW on 2.2		
Boise	KAID	4	PBS		
Boise	KIVI-TV	6	ABC, Independent on 6.2	(Note: Licensed to Nampa, Idaho.)	
Boise	KTVB	7	NBC		
Boise	KNIN-TV	9	Fox	(Note: Licensed to Caldwell, Idaho.)	
Boise	KTRV-TV	12	Ion Television		
Boise	KKJB	39	Telemundo		
Idaho Falls	KIDK	3	Dabl, Fox on 3.2		
Idaho Falls	KPVI-DT	6	NBC	(Note: Licensed to Pocatello, Idaho.)	
Idaho Falls	KIFI-TV	8	ABC, CBS on 8.2, The CW on 8.3, Telemundo on 8.5		
Idaho Falls	KISU-TV	10	PBS	(Note: Satellite of KAID.)	
Idaho Falls	KPIF	15	Grit		
Idaho Falls	KVUI	31	Ion Television		
Twin Falls	KMVT	11	CBS, The CW on 11.2, Fox on 11.3		
Twin Falls	KIPT	13	PBS		
Twin Falls	KXTF	35	TCT		
~Pullman, WA	KLEW-TV	3	CBS	(Note: Licensed to Lewiston, Idaho.)	
~Pullman, WA	KUID-TV	12	PBS	(Note: Licensed to Moscow, Idaho.)	
~Spokane, WA	KCDT	26	PBS	(Note: Licensed to Coeur d'Alene, Idaho.)	

== Low-power ==
Low-power television stations in Idaho
Media market	Station	Channel	Primary affiliation(s)	Notes	Refs
Boise	KTVJ-LD	3	theDove TV		
Boise	KPSW-LD	8	[Blank]		
Boise	K11XP-D	11	[Blank]		
Boise	KKIC-LD	16	Various		
Boise	K17ED-D	17	Various	(Note: Licensed to Payette, Idaho.)	
Boise	KZTN-LD	20	TBN, TCT on 20.2		
Boise	KRID-LD	22	Various		
Boise	K23NB-D	23	Silent		
Boise	KFLL-LD	25	Various		
Boise	KBKI-LD	27	Various		
Boise	K31FD-D	31	3ABN		
Boise	KBSE-LD	33.3	Jewelry Television		
Boise	KEVA-LD	34	Univision		
Boise	KYUU-LD	35	The CW		
Boise	KCBB-LD	41	Telemundo		
Boise	KIWB-LD	43	Various		
Boise	KZAK-LD	49.3	Jewelry Television		
Bonners Ferry	K09ZC-D	9	[Blank]		
Bonners Ferry	K31NL-D	50	3ABN		
Idaho Falls	K16NQ-D	16	[Blank]		
Idaho Falls	K21LI-D	21	[Blank]		
Idaho Falls	K28LE-D	28	3ABN		
Idaho Falls	KPTO-LD	41	Various		
Idaho Falls	K20MO-D	47	3ABN		
Malad City	K31HS-D	31	[Blank]		
Sandpoint	K19LE-D	18	3ABN		
Twin Falls	KSAW-LD	6	ABC	(Note: Semi-satellite of KIVI-TV.)	
Twin Falls	KSVT-LD	14	Fox		
Twin Falls	KYTL-LD	17	Various		
Twin Falls	KGLW-LD	23	Estrella TV		
Twin Falls	KDLN-LD	26	TeleXitos		
Twin Falls	KBAX-LD	27	MeTV		
~Pullman, WA	K30MC-D	30	[Blank]		
~Spokane, WA	K17PA-D	17	[Blank]	(Note: Licensed to Mullan, Idaho.)	

== Translators ==
Television station translators in Idaho
Media market	Station	Channel	Translating	Notes	Refs
Boise	K16JE-D	7	KTVB	(Note: Licensed to Glenns Ferry, Idaho.)	
Bonners Ferry	K35IC-D	2	KREM		
Bonners Ferry	K11HM-D	4	KXLY-TV		
Bonners Ferry	K26OO-D	6	KREM		
Bonners Ferry	K32HA-D	7	KSPS-TV		
Bonners Ferry	K25MP-D	22	KSKN		
Bonners Ferry	K24NO-D	26	KCDT		
Bonners Ferry	K17NZ-D	28	KAYU-TV		
Coolin	K09XY-D	2	KREM		
Coolin	K32OA-D	2	KREM		
Coolin	K10KR-D	4	KXLY-TV		
Coolin	K12LF-D	6	KHQ-TV		
Coolin	K05GL-D	7	KSPS-TV		
Coolin	K31DS-D	7	KSPS-TV		
Coolin	K36PW-D	26	KCDT	(Note: Licensed to Priest Lake, Idaho.)	
Coolin	K11UN-D	28	KAYU-TV		
Coolin	K33QB-D	28	KAYU-TV		
Driggs	K07QC-D	3	KIDK		
Driggs	K32LS-D	6	KPVI-DT		
Driggs	K27KP-D	8	KIFI-TV		
Driggs	K13QE-D	10	KISU-TV		
Garden Valley	K05EY-D	2	KBOI-TV	(Note: Licensed to Terrace Lakes, Idaho.)	
Garden Valley	K20NZ-D	2	KBOI-TV		
Garden Valley	K08QB-D	4	KAID	(Note: Licensed to Crouch, Idaho.)	
Garden Valley	K26OW-D	4	KAID		
Garden Valley	K03ET-D	6	KIVI-TV		
Garden Valley	K32KO-D	6	KIVI-TV		
Garden Valley	K10OA-D	7	KTVB		
Garden Valley	K34MG-D	7	KTVB		
Garden Valley	K14SB-D	12	KTRV-TV		
Garden Valley	K36LZ-D	12	KTRV-TV		
Hagerman	K49IT-D	7	KTFT-LD		
Hagerman	K31IF-D	11	KMVT		
Hagerman	K25OX-D	13	KIPT		
Hagerman	K29GV-D	6	KSAW-LD		
Holbrook	K21OA-D	3	KIDK		
Holbrook	K26OP-D	6	KPVI-DT		
Holbrook	K22NQ-D	8	KIFI-TV		
Holbrook	K25PO-D	10	KISU-TV		
Holbrook	K33QF-D	13	KSTU		
Holbrook	K31PJ-D	14	KJZZ-TV		
Idaho Falls	KXPI-LD	3	KIDK		
Idaho Falls	K11CP-D	3	KIDK	(Note: Licensed to Fish Creek, Idaho.)	
Idaho Falls	K13UF-D	6	KPVI-DT	(Note: Licensed to Rexburg, Idaho.)	
Idaho Falls	K19KY-D	6	KPVI-DT		
Idaho Falls	K34NC-D	8	KIFI-TV		
Idaho Falls	K22IK-D	8	KIFI-TV		
Idaho Falls	K21JC-D	8	KIFI-TV		
Idaho Falls	K13QH-D	10	KISU-TV	(Note: Licensed to Swan Valley, Idaho.)	
Idaho Falls	K14MC-D	10	KISU-TV	(Note: Licensed to Lava Hot Springs, Idaho.)	
Idaho Falls	K15HR-D	10	KISU-TV	(Note: Licensed to Mackay, Idaho.)	
Idaho Falls	K19CY-D	10	KISU-TV	(Note: Licensed to Rockland, Idaho.)	
Idaho Falls	K20MQ-D	10	KISU-TV		
Idaho Falls	K29KG-D	29	KVUI		
Idaho Falls	K29KY-D	29	KVUI	(Note: Licensed to Blackfoot, Idaho.)	
Juliaetta	K07NL-D	2	KREM		
Juliaetta	K16LX-D	3	KLEW-TV		
Juliaetta	K09DF-D	4	KXLY-TV		
Juliaetta	K11DL-D	6	KHQ-TV		
Juliaetta	K22NX-D	12	KUID-TV		
Juliaetta	K23OT-D	28	KAYU-TV		
Lake Cascade	K09LO-D	4	KAID	(Note: Licensed to Cascade, Idaho.)	
Lake Cascade	K11PB-D	4	KAID	(Note: Licensed to Cambridge, Idaho.)	
Lake Cascade	K11WR-D	4	KAID	(Note: Licensed to Council, Idaho.)	
Lake Cascade	K11WT-D	4	KAID	(Note: Licensed to McCall, Idaho.)	
Lake Cascade	K25OR-D	4	KAID		
Lake Cascade	K27DX-D	6	KPVI-DT		
Lake Cascade	K15IO-D	7	KTVB		
Lake Cascade	K17KF-D	7	KTVB		
Lake Cascade	K23KY-D	7	KTVB		
Lake Cascade	K29NB-D	7	KTVB		
Malad City	K32NV-D	3	KIDK		
Malad City	K14RY-D	4	KTVX		
Malad City	K20OF-D	5	KSL-TV		
Malad City	K15IB-D	6	KPVI-DT		
Malad City	K18NC-D	7	KUED		
Malad City	K33IM-D	8	KIFI-TV		
Malad City	K22NV-D	10	KISU-TV		
Malad City	K21HV-D	11	KBYU-TV		
Malad City	K16MW-D	13	KSTU		
Malad City	K25IP-D	14	KJZZ-TV		
Malad City	K26OY-D	16	KUPX-TV		
Mink Creek	K08EZ-D	3	KIDK		
Mink Creek	K11WF-D	4	KTVX		
Mink Creek	K13HA-D	5	KSL-TV		
Mink Creek	K09YP-D	7	KUED		
Mink Creek	K10QJ-D	8	KIFI-TV		
Mink Creek	K07XM-D	13	KSTU		
Mink Creek	K12QS-D	14	KJZZ-TV		
Montpelier	K31CI-D	2	KUTV		
Montpelier	K27CS-D	2	KIDK		
Montpelier	K09PL-D	3	KIDK	(Note: Licensed to Dingle, Idaho.)	
Montpelier	K33DR-D	4	KTVX		
Montpelier	K19DQ-D	5	KSL-TV		
Montpelier	K07ZQ-D	6	KPVI-DT	(Note: Licensed to Georgetown, Idaho.)	
Montpelier	K11PP-D	6	KPVI-DT		
Montpelier	K29BM-D	6	KPVI-DT		
Montpelier	K30OX-D	7	KUED		
Montpelier	K13QY-D	8	KIFI-TV		
Montpelier	K20KU-D	8	KIFI-TV		
Montpelier	K32KC-D	8	KIFI-TV		
Montpelier	K15GO-D	10	KISU-TV		
Montpelier	K23BV-D	10	KISU-TV		
Montpelier	K34OH-D	13	KSTU		
Montpelier	K25CK-D	14	KJZZ-TV		
Salmon	K10AW-D	3	KIDK	(Note: Licensed to Challis, Idaho.)	
Salmon	K05BE-D	8	KPAX-TV	(Note: Licensed to Lemhi, Idaho.)	
Salmon	K08PI-D	8	KPAX-TV		
Salmon	K11BD-D	8	KPAX-TV	(Note: Licensed to Leadore, Idaho.)	
Salmon	K25PY-D	8	KPAX-TV		
Salmon	K32NQ-D	8	KPAX-TV		
Salmon	K34CB-D	8	KPAX-TV		
Salmon	K09SD-D	8	KIFI-TV		
Salmon	K13RV-D	8	KIFI-TV		
Salmon	K15ME-D	8	KIFI-TV		
Salmon	K22IM-D	8	KIFI-TV		
Salmon	K23JH-D	8	KIFI-TV		
Salmon	K12LS-D	10	KISU-TV		
Salmon	K14IJ-D	10	KISU-TV		
Salmon	K29LY-D	10	KISU-TV		
Salmon	K11TY-D	13	KECI-TV		
Salmon	K16KO-D	13	KECI-TV		
Salmon	K27MM-D	13	KECI-TV	(Note: Licensed to Tendoy, Idaho.)	
Salmon	K30BU-D	13	KECI-TV		
Salmon	K30PW-D	13	KECI-TV		
Salmon	K36PM-D	23	KTMF		
Sandpoint	K21NG-D	6	KHQ-TV		
Sandpoint	K23NM-D	7	KSPS-TV		
Sandpoint	K30LS-D	26	KCDT		
Sandpoint	K33LW-D	28	KAYU-TV		
Soda Springs	K34NF-D	3	KIDK		
Soda Springs	K35HD-D	5	KSL-TV		
Soda Springs	K27MW-D	6	KPVI-DT		
Soda Springs	K29LG-D	8	KIFI-TV		
Soda Springs	K31PT-D	10	KISU-TV		
Soda Springs	K21MR-D	11	KBYU-TV		
Soda Springs	K25OI-D	13	KSTU		
Soda Springs	K32LX-D	14	KJZZ-TV		
Soda Springs	K33HO-D	30	KUCW		
Twin Falls	KTFT-LD	7	KTVB		
Twin Falls	K24HU-D	8	KIFI-TV	(Note: Licensed to Burley, Idaho.)	
Twin Falls	K23DO-D	10	KISU-TV	(Note: Licensed to Malta, Idaho.)	
Twin Falls	K30QH-D	11	KMVT		
Twin Falls	K14IC-D	13	KIPT		
~Logan, UT	K04RX-D	7	KUED	(Note: Licensed to Preston, Idaho.)	
~Pullman, WA	K21CC-D	2	KREM		
~Pullman, WA	K16LS-D	4	KXLY-TV	(Note: Licensed to Grangeville, Idaho.)	
~Pullman, WA	K23NQ-D	4	KXLY-TV		
~Pullman, WA	K30QA-D	2	KREM		
~Pullman, WA	K26LJ-D	7	KSPS-TV		
~Pullman, WA	K25NZ-D	12	KUID-TV		
~Spokane, WA	K23HT-D	12	KUID-TV	(Note: Licensed to St. Maries, Idaho.)	
~Spokane, WA	K27NC-D	28	KAYU-TV		

== Defunct ==
- KIDA Sun Valley/Twin Falls (2003–2009)
- KFXD-TV Nampa (1953)
- KCIX-TV Nampa/Boise (1958–1960)
- KTLE Pocatello (1959–1961 and 1962–1964)
- KBGH Filer/Twin Falls (1994–2009)
