= KMVT =

Television station in Twin Falls, Idaho

- Twin Falls, Idaho; United States
- Channels: Digital: 11 (VHF); Virtual: 11
- Branding: KMVT 11

Programming
- Affiliations: 11.1: CBS; 11.3: Fox/MyNetworkTV

Ownership
- Owner: E. W. Scripps Company; (ION Television License, LLC)
- Sister stations: KSVT-CD, KSAW-LD

History
- First air date: May 31, 1955
- Former call signs: KLIX-TV (1955–1963)
- Former channel numbers: Analog: 11 (VHF, 1955–2009); Digital: 16 (UHF, until 2009)
- Former affiliations: ABC (primary, 1973–1977); NBC (primary, 1977–1985) (Note: KMVT was a primary affiliate of CBS from 1957 to 1973 but held affiliations with all three networks for the first 30-plus years of operation. It dropped ABC programming—except for special events such as the Olympics and World Series—in January 1979. After becoming a primary CBS affiliate, KMVT continued to air selected NBC programming until June 1, 1986.); The CW Plus (11.2, until 2026)
- Call sign meaning: Magic Valley Television

Technical information
- Licensing authority: FCC
- Facility ID: 35200
- ERP: 40 kW
- HAAT: 323 m (1,060 ft)
- Transmitter coordinates: 42°43′46.9″N 114°24′55″W

Links
- Public license information: Public file; LMS
- Website: www.kmvt.com

KMVT (channel 11) is a television station in Twin Falls, Idaho, United States, affiliated with CBS. It is owned by the E. W. Scripps Company alongside Fox affiliate KSVT-CD (channel 14) and ABC affiliate KSAW-LD (channel 6). KMVT and KSVT-CD share studios on Blue Lakes Boulevard North/US 93 in Twin Falls; KMVT's transmitter is located on Flat Top Butte east of Jerome.

KMVT began broadcasting on May 31, 1955, as KLIX-TV, an extension of KLIX radio and the first television station in Twin Falls. Built by the Carman–Wrathall group and owned by the Glasmann family from 1955 to 1970, it was a primary CBS affiliate, although it aired programs from all three networks. Under Western Broadcasting ownership in the 1970s, the station changed primary affiliations twice, to ABC in 1973 and NBC in 1977, although its lineup continued to incorporate the other networks in varying proportions.

Root Communications acquired KMVT in 1984 and fitted out the station's current studio facility. The station returned to CBS affiliation in 1985 and began airing its programs exclusively the next year. In spite of the arrival of competing commercial stations to the market in the late 1980s, KMVT continued to dominate as the only local news station, with evening news audience shares surpassing 70 percent. Catamount Broadcast Group acquired KMVT in 1998 and sold it to the Neuhoff family in 2004; under the latter's ownership, KMVT acquired low-power TV stations as well as the CW and Fox affiliations for the Twin Falls market. Gray Media purchased KMVT in 2015 and traded it to Scripps in 2026.

== History ==
=== Construction and early years ===
On August 21, 1952, the Southern Idaho Broadcasting and Television Company, owner of local radio station KLIX (1310 AM), applied to the Federal Communications Commission (FCC) for permission to construct a new television station on channel 11 in Twin Falls, Idaho, with its transmitter on Flat Top Butte east of Jerome. The permit was granted by the commission on March 18, 1953, but the question of whether Twin Falls and the Magic Valley were large enough to support a television station was in doubt. More than two years passed before construction was completed and KLIX-TV broadcast its first test pattern on May 31, 1955. In that time, the FCC had granted three extensions to Southern Idaho Broadcasting and Television. The Carman–Wrathall group that had owned the KLIX stations, gave options to the Kearns-Tribune Corporation and the Standard-Examiner Publishing Corporation, publisher of the Ogden Standard-Examiner in Utah, to buy their properties in 1955. A. L. Glasmann, publisher of the Standard-Examiner, and members of his family acquired the KLIX stations under these options in a deal announced in December 1955 and approved in March 1956. Glasmann later recalled that the station's construction was "piecemeal", with only one camera available for broadcasts.

KLIX-TV had an affiliation with CBS, having signed on to its Extended Market Plan for small-market stations in December 1954, as well as NBC and ABC. With no remote facilities, local programming had to come to the studio. In one case, a city council and zoning hearing was held in the studio for telecasting, and a horse show took place outside on the lawn. In 1958, KLIX-TV, KID-TV in Idaho Falls and four stations in Montana joined to form the Skyline Network, which provided network programming by microwave transmission from the network affiliates in Salt Lake City. In the early years, KLIX-TV also fought for protection from the duplication of programs it aired on the feeds of Salt Lake City TV stations provided via cable television, which weakened the value of local advertising on channel 11. In 1962, it won a ruling against Cable Vision Inc. that prevented it from duplicating KLIX-TV's programming on its feeds of Salt Lake City stations.

The Glasmann family sold off KLIX radio in 1963, resulting in a change of call sign for channel 11 to KMVT (Magic Valley Television) on June 5 or 14, 1963. The two stations, although under separate management, remained in the same building on Eastland Drive. During this period, the station underwent a series of technical improvements, starting with the construction of a second studio in 1960, including the construction of a taller tower in Jerome, and ending with a new transmitter that enabled KMVT to broadcast network programming in color. Local color programming required new cameras and an upgraded lighting setup.

The Skyline Network folded in 1969, as a result of ownership changes at the participating stations, and was replaced by the Television Network of Idaho, which offered national sales for KTVB in Boise, KIFI-TV in Idaho Falls, and KMVT. The network built a microwave distribution system for the airing of news and other programs on a statewide basis.

=== Western Broadcasting ownership ===
In 1970, Glasmann sold KMVT to the Western Broadcasting Company, owned by Dale Moore of Missoula, Montana. At the time, Western owned Twin Falls radio station KTFI, which the FCC required to be divested as part of the acquisition.

The Glasmann era heralded two separate shifts of network affiliation for KMVT, which until this time had been a primary CBS affiliate. The station switched to primary ABC in 1973 and to primary NBC on May 1, 1977. The move bucked a trend of ABC acquiring affiliations, including in large markets, as it rose to number-one in the national ratings. The remaining ABC programs disappeared from channel 11's lineup in January 1979, when KID-TV—no longer a secondary ABC affiliate in its market—ceased transmitting them on the microwave link from Salt Lake City. As a result, KMVT lost ABC at a time when it was the number-one network. In 1982, the station reduced its carriage of CBS programs to a minimum—a soap opera and network sports—because it believed CBS might not renew the affiliation agreement amid a contract dispute.

On December 31, 1983, prior to its official premiere during Super Bowl XVIII the following month, KMVT aired Apple Computer's critically acclaimed Macintosh computer commercial "1984" shortly before midnight, to ensure the ad would qualify for industry awards which were only eligible for ads that aired during 1983. Tom Frank, the director-operator at the time, said that the station may have been chosen due to its remote location and its proximity to Sun Valley, which he described as being a "part-time home of many in the entertainment and advertising business".

=== Root Communications ownership ===
Dale Moore died in a 1981 plane crash in Idaho. Two years later, Western Broadcasting agreed to sell KMVT to Root Communications of Daytona Beach, a firm expanding into radio in Florida at the same time it acquired KMVT. The grandfather of the company's owner, Chapman S. Root, had designed the Coca-Cola bottle. The transaction received FCC approval in January 1984.

Under Root, KMVT moved in January 1986 from its existing building on Eastland Drive and into a former life insurance office, twice the size, on Blue Lakes Boulevard North. The new equipment in the facility improved the quality of KMVT's on-air signal. There was also one more affiliation switch for the station, which changed to a primary CBS affiliate on September 9, 1985, while retaining Today and some other NBC shows. By this time, ABC programming was only being used for specials such as the Olympics and World Series. The changes were part of an effort to increase ratings and revenue. KMVT dropped its remaining NBC programs on June 1, 1986, at the behest of the network, which was preparing the way for KTVB to launch a translator in Twin Falls. That translator, K38AS (now KTFT-LD), launched on July 1, 1986, offering KTVB programming with Twin Falls–area commercials. K38AS was one of several stations to enter the Twin Falls market between 1985 and 1989. Boise ABC affiliate KIVI-TV opened a translator in 1985, a low-power station K49AZ began in 1986, and a full-power channel 35 launched as ABC affiliate KKVI in 1989. For the first time, KMVT had competition for Magic Valley viewers and advertisers. In November 1993, KMVT's 10 p.m. newscast attracted a 71 percent audience share—the second highest of any late local newscast in the nation.

=== Since 1998 ===
Root considered selling KMVT in 1996 but instead ordered budget cutbacks. The next year, the firm sold the station to Catamount Broadcast Group, a new company owned by former TV advertising sales representative Raymond Johns. In 2004, Catamount sold KMVT to the Neuhoff family, which had experience owning radio and TV stations elsewhere in the United States.

Neuhoff acquired two low-power TV stations in 2005: KTWT-LP (channel 43) and KTID-LP (channel 58), which after 2006 aired programming from The CW and MyNetworkTV, respectively. In 2012, KXTF (the former KKVI) dropped Fox in a dispute over retransmission consent fees, and on July 1, KTWT became the Fox affiliate as "Fox 14", with CW programming moving to a subchannel of KMVT. The new Fox 14 offered KMVT newscasts at 7 a.m. and 5 and 9 p.m. In 2014, KTWT became KSVT-LD (Sun Valley Television), coinciding with the opening of a Wood River Valley news bureau for KMVT.

On March 12, 2015, Neuhoff Communications announced the sale of KMVT and KSVT to Gray Television for $17.5 million; the sale was completed on July 1.

On July 7, 2025, it was announced that, in an exchange of several stations between Gray Media and the E. W. Scripps Company, KMVT and KSVT-LD would be traded to Scripps, owner of KIVI-TV and KSAW-LD. The FCC approved the multi-market exchange on April 28, 2026.

== Technical information ==
=== Subchannels ===
KMVT's transmitter is located on Flat Top Butte east of Jerome. The station's signal is multiplexed:

Subchannels of KMVT
Subchannel	Res.	Short name	Programming
11.1	1080i	KMVTHD	CBS
11.2	720p	CWHD	[Blank]
11.3	480i	FOXSD	Fox (KSVT-CD) in SD
11.4	480i	KMVTOUT	Outlaw

Simulcast of subchannels of another station

=== Translators ===
Two translators extend KMVT's signal.

- Burley: K30QH-D
- Hagerman: K31IF-D
