= KBCI =

KBCI may refer to:

- KBCI-LD, a low-power television station (channel 9, virtual 34) licensed to serve Bonners Ferry, Idaho, United States
- KBOI-TV, a television station (channel 9, virtual 2) licensed to serve Boise, Idaho, which held the call sign KBCI-TV from 1975 to 2010
