= KSAW-LD =

Television station in Twin Falls, Idaho

Semi-satellite of KIVI-TV, Nampa–Boise, Idaho

- Twin Falls–Burley, Idaho; United States
- City: Twin Falls, Idaho
- Channels: Digital: 28 (UHF); Virtual: 6
- Branding: Idaho News 6; The Spot Idaho (6.2)

Programming
- Affiliations: 6.1: ABC; for others, see § Subchannels

Ownership
- Owner: E. W. Scripps Company; (Scripps Broadcasting Holdings LLC)
- Sister stations: KMVT, KSVT-CD

History
- Founded: January 28, 1985
- First air date: March 21, 1985
- Former call signs: K27AO (1985–1989); K68CO (1989–1996); KSAW-LP (1996–2009)
- Former channel numbers: Analog: 27 (UHF, 1985–1989), 68 (UHF, 1989–2000), 52 (UHF, 2000–2005), 51 (UHF, 2005–2009); Digital: 51 (UHF, 2008–2014), 15 (UHF, 2014–2021); Virtual: 51 (2008–2015)
- Call sign meaning: Sawtooth Communications (former owner of KIVI)

Technical information
- Licensing authority: FCC
- Facility ID: 59256
- Class: LD
- ERP: 15 kW
- HAAT: 169 m (554 ft)
- Transmitter coordinates: 42°43′45.9″N 114°24′56.5″W
- Translator(s): K29GV-D Hagerman–Gooding

Links
- Public license information: LMS
- Website: www.kivitv.com/ksaw

KSAW-LD (channel 6) is a low-power television station in Twin Falls, Idaho, United States, affiliated with ABC. It is owned by the E. W. Scripps Company alongside CBS affiliate KMVT (channel 11) and Fox affiliate KSVT-CD (channel 14). KSAW-LD maintains an advertising sales office in the Blue Lakes Office Park on Falls Avenue in Twin Falls (housed in the same building as the sales office of NBC outlet KTFT-LD), and its transmitter is located on Flat Top Butte near Jerome, Idaho.

Although identifying as a separate station in its own right, KSAW-LD is considered a semi-satellite of Nampa-licensed KIVI-TV (channel 6), which serves the Boise market. KSAW clears all network programming as provided through its parent and simulcasts some of KIVI's newscasts, but airs a separate offering of syndicated programming; there are also separate evening newscasts originating from KIVI's studios, as well as separate station identifications and commercial inserts targeting the Magic Valley. KSAW's master control, as well as most internal operations, are housed at KIVI's studios on East Chisholm Drive in Nampa (along I-84/US 30/SH-55).

KSAW-LD's signal simulcasts three of KIVI's digital subchannels (carrying Laff, Ion Mystery and Court TV); however, none of them are carried on the Sparklight cable system in Twin Falls.

== History ==
In 1985, KIVI established K27AO, a 100-watt channel 27 translator, to serve viewers in the Magic Valley. In June 1989, this translator was upgraded to 1,000 watts on channel 68 as K68CO. That same year, KKVI channel 35 began operating as a semi-satellite of KPVI in Pocatello, creating a full-power ABC affiliate in the Twin Falls area. Beginning on January 1, 1990, KKVI held syndication exclusivity priority over KIVI on Twin Falls cable systems for ABC programs the two stations aired at the same time. The next year, King Videocable, the main cable system in the Twin Falls market, moved KIVI from its channel 6 position to share channel 30 with the Home Shopping Network and placed KKVI on channel 6.

In 1995, an affiliation switch hit the Pocatello–Idaho Falls market. KIFI-TV affiliated with ABC, and KPVI became an NBC affiliate. NBC was already seen in Twin Falls by way of KTFT, a low-power semi-satellite of KTVB in Boise. KKVI, which had already been a secondary Fox outlet, then became the market's Fox affiliate in January 1996; at that time, KIVI returned to full-time carriage on Twin Falls cable systems. On August 28, 1996, K68CO became KSAW-LP, at which time it also began airing separate commercials from KIVI.

In 2000, with the phasing out of channels 60 to 69 from television use, KSAW moved to channel 52. The phasing out of channels 52 to 59 forced KSAW to move again to channel 51.

On July 30, 2014, it was announced that the E. W. Scripps Company would acquire Journal Communications in an all-stock transaction. The combined firm will retain their broadcast properties, including KSAW, and spin off their print assets as Journal Media Group. The FCC approved the deal on December 12, 2014. It was approved by shareholders on March 11, 2015. It closed on April 1. Afterwards, Scripps made the decision to drop all usage of channel 51 from KSAW-LD, opting to use the same channel 6 branding as KIVI-TV; its virtual channel was also changed from 51 to 6.

KSAW's second subchannel became "Twin Falls 6" in October 2023, as Scripps acquired local rights to air the Vegas Golden Knights.

== Local news ==
Though KSAW was established as a separate station from KIVI in August 1996, it continued to simulcast all of KIVI's local newscasts from Boise, which featured regional forecasts geared toward the Magic Valley.

Scripps announced plans to launch a dedicated evening newscast for KSAW, beginning on April 13, 2020; it is produced and anchored from Boise, and features three Twin Falls-based reporters, creating the second television newsroom in the market (after KMVT). The program airs live at 5:30 p.m. weeknights and is tape delayed at 10 p.m. KSAW and KIVI also concurrently rebranded from 6 On Your Side to Idaho News 6. KIVI's morning and weekend newscasts continue to be simulcast on KSAW.

== Subchannels ==
The station's signal is multiplexed:

Subchannels of KSAW-LD
Subchannel	Res.	Short name	Programming
6.1	720p	KSAW-DT	ABC
6.2	720p	TF 6	Independent /; Vegas Golden Knights games
6.3	480i	ESCAPE	Ion Mystery
6.4	480i	GRIT	Grit
6.5	480i	CourtTV	Court TV
6.6	480i	LAFF	Laff

=== Translator ===
- K29GV-D Hagerman
