= KTRV-TV =

Television station in Nampa, Idaho

- Nampa–Boise, Idaho; United States
- City: Nampa, Idaho
- Channels: Digital: 13 (VHF); Virtual: 12

Programming
- Affiliations: 12.1: Ion Television; for others, see § Subchannels

Ownership
- Owner: Inyo Broadcast Holdings (sale to the E. W. Scripps Company pending); (Inyo Broadcast Licenses LLC)

History
- First air date: October 18, 1981
- Former call signs: KTRV (1981–2006)
- Former channel numbers: Analog: 12 (VHF, 1981–2009)
- Former affiliations: Independent (1981–1986, 2011–2012); Fox (1986–2011); MyNetworkTV (2012–2017)
- Call sign meaning: Treasure Valley

Technical information
- Licensing authority: FCC
- Facility ID: 28230
- ERP: 17 kW
- HAAT: 829 m (2,720 ft)
- Transmitter coordinates: 43°45′18″N 116°5′55″W

Links
- Public license information: Public file; LMS
- Website: iontelevision.com

KTRV-TV (channel 12) is a television station licensed to Nampa, Idaho, United States, serving the Boise area as an affiliate of Ion Television. Owned by Inyo Broadcast Holdings, the station maintains a transmitter located at the Bogus Basin ski area summit in unincorporated Boise County.

KTRV began broadcasting in October 1981 as the first independent station in modern Idaho television. It was sold to Block Communications in 1985 and affiliated with Fox the next year. The station launched local newscasts in 1999. However, in 2011, Fox moved its affiliation from KTRV to KNIN-TV because Block was unwilling to pay affiliation fees that the network sought amid an aggressive posture; KTRV-TV was one of two stations to lose its affiliation at that time. The local newscasts were scrapped, and the station briefly became an independent station before affiliating with MyNetworkTV in 2012. Block changed tack in 2016 and affiliated with Ion, a "more immersive" network that had a 24-hour program lineup. Ion Media then acquired the station in 2017. As with other Ion stations that the E. W. Scripps Company could not acquire due to local or national ownership limits, Inyo Broadcast Holdings acquired KTRV-TV in 2021.

== History ==
=== Construction ===
The first party to express interest in a channel 12 station in Nampa was William P. Ledbetter, an Arizona transplant who proposed a Christian-oriented outlet; his attempt to purchase a radio station in his former home city of Phoenix, Arizona, was withdrawn when the Federal Communications Commission (FCC) was apprised that people who he had claimed to have promised him money to buy the station had not actually done so.

Movement to build channel 12 began in earnest when the Peyton Broadcasting Corporation applied for a construction permit in March 1980, believing that the Boise market had grown to the point where it could sustain an independent station despite its comparative size. The company was led by Cary Jones of Chicago—and named for one of his uncles—and included his stepfather, longtime independent station executive John Serrao; his mother and brother; and two investors from out of state. The permit was granted by the FCC on November 6, 1980. The station opened offices in Nampa in July 1981 and broke ground on its transmitter at Deer Point that same month.

KTRV began broadcasting on October 18, 1981. It was a typical independent station—the first modern independent in Idaho television (Note: The other two were the short-lived channel 6 stations: KFXD-TV, on the air for two months in the summer of 1953, and KCIX-TV, which broadcast from 1958 to 1960.)—in its mix of syndicated reruns and movies; programming highlights included a nightly 8 p.m. movie, morning religious shows and cartoons, and off-network series in the afternoon. It was atypical in serving a market the size of Boise, often considered too small to support an independent station; KTRV became one of the nation's smallest-market independents. The station produced and aired a Sunday night public affairs program, Canyon Forum, hosted by a reporter from the Idaho Press Tribune newspaper.

KTRV was immediately successful. Per Arbitron, it attracted a 19 share—19 percent of prime time viewership—in November 1981, its first full month on the air. This led all independents nationwide and surpassed two other independents in the West, KVVU-TV in Las Vegas and KPHO-TV in Phoenix, each with 13 percent. This success inspired at least one other small-market outlet to make a go of independence: the founding owner of KUSK in Prescott, Arizona, cited KTRV as an encouraging sign for the future of his station.

Jones sold KTRV to Idaho Independent Television, a subsidiary of The Toledo Blade Company (Block Communications), in 1985 for $4.9 million. It was the Blade Company's first television station outside the Midwest, with its existing broadcast holdings in Ohio, Indiana, and Kentucky. It became a charter affiliate of Fox when the network launched on October 9, 1986.

With the growth of the Fox network, KTRV launched a half-hour 9 p.m. local newscast, Fox 12 News, on May 31, 1999, hiring a news staff of 29. The format took inspiration from Block-owned WDRB in Louisville, Kentucky, and from KSTU in Salt Lake City, both Fox affiliates that had started local newscasts earlier in the decade. An earlier newscast at 4:30 p.m. was also offered but cut back at the start of 2002. By 2007, the weeknight editions of Fox 12 News at 9 had grown to an hour in length; that April, a two-hour morning show, Fox 12 This Morning, premiered. Station management cited the rapid growth of the Boise area as a reason for starting the morning newscast, as well as demand for a local program in the 7 a.m. hour when the network affiliates aired national morning shows. However, in the broader market, TV news audiences were not growing as quickly as the Treasure Valley's population.

=== Loss of Fox affiliation; switch to MyNetworkTV ===
In May 2011, Fox unexpectedly announced that it would move its affiliation in the Boise market effective September 1 to KNIN-TV (channel 9), then an affiliate of The CW owned by the Journal Broadcast Group. The affiliation switch was one of two announced the same day; both were part of disputes with the network involving affiliation fees. The CW bypassed KTRV-TV, switching to a subchannel of local CBS affiliate KBOI-TV.

In response, KTRV-TV management initially doubled down on local programming. Recalling the name of the station licensee from 1985, general manager Ricky Joseph told Broadcasting & Cable, "We really have the opportunity to be what's on our license: Idaho Independent Television." Prime time was initially filled with a double run of 30 Rock at 7 p.m. and Law & Order: Criminal Intent at 8 p.m. The news department was to be expanded with six new employees, part of a shake-up that promised a competitive and crowded news landscape in a market long dominated in ratings and revenue by KTVB but which was facing economic headwinds due to a fall-off in new construction.

In early December, the station abandoned its news expansion plans and shut down the entire newsroom. Bill Lamb, vice president of Block Communications, informed the media in a written statement, "A network affiliate requires a different business model than does an independent station." Program changes followed in January 2012, with MyNetworkTV programs moving from the second subchannel to the main channel, freeing up 24-hour carriage of MeTV, a diginet specializing in classic TV shows.

=== Ion affiliation ===
On September 1, 2016, KTRV joined Ion Television, a 24-hour network presenting daylong blocks of procedural dramas, as an affiliate. The station had announced on August 31 that it would become an Ion affiliate by October 1; in the announcement, Block Communications chairman Allan Block said that "the timing was right to move to a more immersive network".

Ion Media Networks, owner of the network, then announced in June 2017 that it would purchase KTRV-TV from Block Communications and two other stations—WRBU in St. Louis and WZRB in Columbia, South Carolina—from a divestiture trust. The sale was completed on October 24, 2017. The E. W. Scripps Company purchased Ion Media in 2020; because it owned KIVI-TV and operated KNIN-TV, it could not acquire KTRV-TV. Twenty-three stations in such positions were sold to Inyo Broadcast Holdings in a transaction that closed at the start of 2021.

Scripps announced its repurchase of all Inyo stations on February 26, 2026.

== Technical information ==
=== Subchannels ===
The KTRV-TV transmitter is located at Bogus Basin in unincorporated Boise County. Its signal is multiplexed:

Subchannels of KTRV-TV
Subchannel	Res.	Short name	Programming
12.1	720p	ION	Ion Television
12.2	720p	CourtTV	Court TV
12.3	480i	Grit	Grit
12.4	480i	BUSTED	Busted
12.5	480i	IONPlus	Ion Plus
12.6	480i	GameSho	Game Show Central
12.7	480i	QVC	QVC
12.8	480i	HSN	HSN

=== Analog-to-digital conversion ===
KTRV-TV shut down its analog signal, over VHF channel 12, on June 12, 2009, the official date on which full-power television stations in the United States transitioned from analog to digital broadcasts under federal mandate. The station's digital signal remained on its pre-transition VHF channel 13, using virtual channel 12.

=== Translators ===
KTRV-TV is repeated on two low-power translators in the Garden Valley area.

- Garden Valley: K36LZ-D
- Terrace Lakes: K14SB-D
