= KCIX-TV =

Television station in Nampa, Idaho (1958–1960)

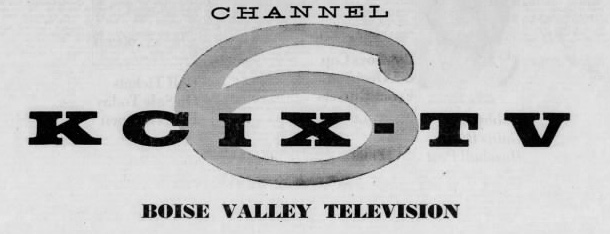
- Nampa–Boise, Idaho; United States
- City: Nampa, Idaho
- Channels: Analog: 6 (VHF)

Ownership
- Owner: Hagadone Broadcasting Co.

History
- First air date: November 9, 1958
- Last air date: January 4, 1960

Technical information
- ERP: 8.32 kW
- HAAT: 104 m (340 ft)

KCIX-TV (channel 6) was a television station in Nampa, Idaho, United States, which broadcast from November 9, 1958, to January 4, 1960. It was the second attempt to establish a station on the allocation, after KFXD-TV, which had lasted two months in 1953.

== History ==
Radio Boise, Inc.—soon changed to the Hagadone Broadcasting Company—received the construction permit to build a new channel 6 TV station from the Federal Communications Commission (FCC) on March 27, 1958. Hagadone had recently sold KYME radio in Boise and at the time of the grant was owner of a radio station in Soda Springs. The station signed on November 9, 1958, from leased space in the Nampa transmitter building of KFXD (580 AM) and an antenna on one of the station's towers; plans called for the eventual establishment of the station's own studio base in Nampa. While it was promised that the station would use syndicated programming from ABC, and that live network affiliation was being negotiated, none came to pass. At the time, ABC was relegated to off-hours clearances on primary NBC affiliate KIDO-TV (channel 7).

Hagadone got the station on air, but was unable to secure a network affiliation. Seeking additional capital for the company, Hagadone reached a deal in August 1959 to join forces with Pocatello radio station KBLI, which held the construction permit for KTLE, also on channel 6, in that eastern Idaho city; the two stations would share programming. Hagadone would own 20 percent of the combined company, "KTLI, Inc.", with a majority stake being owned by Howard Johnson, who also owned KNAK in Salt Lake City. Plans were revealed to move KCIX's transmitter to Deer Point in the Boise National Forest, improving the station's coverage. The station switched to operating on a minimum schedule while it awaited FCC action on the transfer of control. On January 4, 1960, Hagadone then announced the station would go off the air altogether pending approval.

The transaction had fallen apart by mid-1960, when the purchase of KCIX-TV by the Publix Broadcasting Co., incorporated by Samuel Nissley (owner of KLOR-TV in Provo, Utah) and Vern Kloepfer, was announced. Publix promised new call letters, a new studio near Boise, and a new transmitter site on Deer Point, and it claimed to be in negotiations for an ABC affiliation. In December, Hagadone sued KBLI, seeking $9,500 it had placed as a down payment before opting to back out of the sale agreement. That same month, the two other stations in Boise, KBOI-TV and KIDO-TV, filed to block Publix's concurrent attempt to purchase KYME radio, claiming it was selling securities to the Idaho public without registering with the Securities and Exchange Commission. Not long after, KTLE, the Pocatello station with which KCIX-TV was to be associated, signed off the air as a result of NBC moving its affiliation for that market to KIFI-TV in Idaho Falls.

The license remained in force until the FCC dismissed its renewal application on June 18, 1964.
