= KIVI-TV =

Television station in Nampa, Idaho

- Nampa–Boise, Idaho; United States
- City: Nampa, Idaho
- Channels: Digital: 24 (UHF); Virtual: 6
- Branding: Idaho News 6; The Spot Idaho (6.2)

Programming
- Affiliations: 6.1: ABC; for others, see § Subchannels

Ownership
- Owner: E. W. Scripps Company; (Scripps Broadcasting Holdings LLC)
- Sister stations: KSAW-LD

History
- First air date: February 1, 1974
- Former call signs: KITC (February–April 1974); KIVI (April 1974–2009)
- Former channel numbers: Analog: 6 (VHF, 1974–2009)
- Call sign meaning: Idaho and VI for the Roman numeral 6

Technical information
- Licensing authority: FCC
- Facility ID: 59255
- ERP: 736 kW
- HAAT: 858.1 m (2,815 ft)
- Transmitter coordinates: 43°45′20.8″N 116°5′57″W
- Translator(s): see § Translators

Links
- Public license information: Public file; LMS
- Website: www.kivitv.com

KIVI-TV (channel 6) is a television station licensed to Nampa, Idaho, United States, serving the Boise area as an affiliate of ABC. Owned by the E. W. Scripps Company, the station maintains studios on East Chisholm Drive in Nampa (along I-84/US 30/SH-55), while its transmitter is located at the Bogus Basin ski area summit in unincorporated Boise County.

KIVI-TV operates KSAW-LD in Twin Falls, a semi-satellite of KIVI for the Magic Valley. It airs KIVI's ABC programs and some of its newscasts, alongside local commercials, separate evening newscasts produced from Nampa covering the Twin Falls area, and separate syndicated programming. KSAW-LD also maintains a small advertising sales office in the Blue Lakes Office Park on Falls Avenue in Twin Falls.

== History ==
=== Prior use of channel 6 ===
What is now KIVI-TV is actually the third attempt to launch a television station on channel 6 in Nampa, Idaho, but the first to be successful.

The first of these earned the distinction of being Idaho's first television station. KFXD-TV broadcast under special temporary authority from June 18 to August 11, 1953. However, it was unable to obtain a network affiliation. KIDO-TV (channel 7, now KTVB), which signed on in July 1953, was a primary NBC affiliate but also had secondary affiliations with CBS, ABC and DuMont Television Network. Unable to find programming and limited to a two-man operation, KFXD-TV went off the air after only two months. It was the first VHF television station in the United States to go dark altogether. Three months later, KBOI-TV (channel 2) signed on in November 1953 as a primary CBS affiliate but also aired some ABC programs.

In the meantime, KFXD's owners sold the permit to the owners of Boise radio station KGEM, who changed the call sign to KTVI (moving them from a previous construction permit on channel 9). However, after expressing concerns that Boise was not yet large enough to support three television stations, KGEM returned the channel 6 permit to the FCC.

The next occupant of channel 6 was KCIX-TV, which operated November 1958 to January 1960. While it had a slightly longer run than KFXD-TV, it too failed to secure a network affiliation, and went silent awaiting the completion of a merger deal with a radio and television station in Pocatello that fell apart.

=== Early years ===
In 1968, two parties filed to make a third attempt at channel 6 in Nampa, both of them seeking a hookup with ABC. Actor Robert Taylor was the headline name in one bidder, Snake River Valley Television, while James Lavenstein of Salt Lake City backed the bid of the Idaho Television Corporation. A construction permit was granted to Idaho Television Corporation on May 26, 1971.

The station signed on February 1, 1974, as KITC, representing its ownership. It was delayed a month by the collapse of the tower for Pocatello sister station KPTO (changed before launch to KPVI) during construction. After 21 years and two false starts, Boise had full service from all three major networks for the first time. On April 15, KITC changed its call sign to KIVI. At that time, the station opened its Nampa studios, after having begun broadcasting from two mobile homes, and began producing local news programming on April 27, the same day that KPVI launched.

Idaho Television Company sold KIVI, along with KPVI in Pocatello, to Futura Titanium Corporation in 1977. Futura, in turn, sold the station to the Evening Post Publishing Company in 1981, and Evening Post struck a deal to sell KIVI to Milwaukee-based Journal Communications in 2001, with the deal closing in 2002.

While KIVI had operated a translator in the Magic Valley since 1985—despite the later existence of KKVI, a full-power ABC affiliate and satellite of KPVI established in 1989—an affiliation shuffle in January 1996, in which KPVI became an NBC affiliate but KKVI instead switched to Fox, led to the upgrading of translator K68CO to semi-satellite KSAW-LP, airing its own commercials.

=== Becoming a duopoly and sale to Scripps ===
On July 1, 2008, it was reported Banks Broadcasting had agreed to sell KNIN-TV (channel 9) to Journal Communications, which would create Boise's first television duopoly. On November 10, the Federal Communications Commission (FCC) initially rejected the application. Shortly afterward, Banks Broadcasting filed an appeal. The FCC reversed its decision to reject the deal on January 16, 2009. The purchase closed on April 24, at which point KNIN vacated its longtime studios on West Bannock Street in downtown Boise and was integrated into KIVI's facilities in Nampa.

On July 30, 2014, it was announced that the E. W. Scripps Company would acquire Journal Communications in an all-stock transaction. The combined firm retained the companies' broadcast holdings and spun off their print assets as Journal Media Group. Originally, KIVI-TV, KNIN-TV and five radio stations were not included in the merger; in September, Journal filed to transfer these stations to Journal/Scripps Divestiture Trust (with Kiel Media Group as trustee). The merger was completed on April 1, 2015. Scripps retained KIVI and the five radio stations, but not KNIN. However, KIVI continued to provide services and facilities to KNIN, which was sold to Raycom Media and then Gray Television, until Gray sold the station to Marquee Broadcasting in 2023.

KIVI's second subchannel became "Boise 6" in October 2023, as Scripps acquired local rights to air the Vegas Golden Knights.

== News operation ==
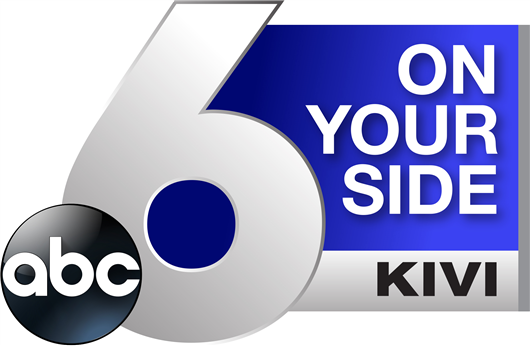
Logo from 2017 to 2020

The station currently ranks at a distant second place to KTVB (and sometimes third behind KBOI) in Nielsen ratings for all newscast periods. Until July 2010, KIVI aired an hour-long broadcast weeknights at 6 along with KBOI. The 6:30 portion was eventually dropped as a result of low viewership in the comparative time slot. Following Journal's acquisition of KNIN, KIVI began producing a weeknight prime time newscast on that station. Known as Today's 6 News on K9, the show was seen for thirty minutes and competed with a nightly half-hour newscast on then RTV affiliate KYUU-LP (which was produced by KBOI).

In January 2011, KIVI upgraded its local newscasts to 16:9 enhanced definition widescreen with the KNIN show being included in the change. Although not true high definition level, broadcasts match the aspect ratio of HD television screens. Corresponding with KNIN's affiliation switch to Fox in September 2011, its prime time show became known as Fox 9 News at 9 and initially featured separate news anchors but shared other personnel with KIVI.

The prime time show was also expanded to an hour on weeknights and added a weekend edition. Around the same time, the station's logo coloring was changed from gold, maroon and silver to red, white and blue; this was to allow the station to utilize the same standardized Renderon graphics package used by Journal's Milwaukee flagship WTMJ-TV and other company-owned stations.

Although most semi-satellites of another station provide some coverage of their home territory (in this case, the state of Idaho), until 2020, KSAW did not produce any local inserts for the Magic Valley during KIVI's newscasts since there were no news-related personnel locally based out of their Twin Falls offices. On April 13, 2020, following the hiring of three Twin Falls-based reporters, KSAW launched separate evening newscasts, which are produced and anchored out of KIVI; morning and weekend newscasts continue to be simulcast on both stations. Concurrently, KIVI and KSAW rebranded from 6 On Your Side to Idaho News 6.

In 2023, after cutting ties with KIVI-TV, KNIN-TV dropped the newscasts from channel 6 and began broadcasting newscasts produced by KBOI-TV.

== Technical information ==
=== Subchannels ===
The station's signal is multiplexed:

Subchannels of KIVI-TV
Channel	Res.	Short name	Programming
6.1	720p	KIVI-DT	ABC
6.2	720p	Boise6	Independent /; Vegas Golden Knights games
6.3	480i	MYSTERY	Ion Mystery
6.4	480i	BOUNCE	Bounce TV
6.5	480i	LAFF	Laff
6.6	480i	GET	Great

=== Analog-to-digital conversion ===
KIVI shut down its analog signal, over VHF channel 6, on June 19, 2009, one week later. All of Journal's television stations (including KIVI) added or regained the "-TV" suffix. The station's digital signal remained on its pre-transition UHF channel 24, using virtual channel 6.

=== Translators ===
- K32KO-D Garden Valley
- K27DX-D McCall
- K16JZ-D McDermitt, NV
- K03ET-D Terrace Lakes
