= KTRV =

KTRV may refer to:

- Tactical Missiles Corporation, Russia
- KTRV-TV, a television station (channel 12) licensed to Nampa, Idaho, United States
