= K49AZ =

Television station in Twin Falls, Idaho

- Twin Falls, Idaho; United States
- Channels: Analog: 49 (UHF)

Programming
- Affiliations: Independent

Ownership
- Owner: American Community Broadcasting Co., Inc.

History
- First air date: July 16, 1986
- Last air date: May 20, 1989

Technical information
- Facility ID: 1516
- Class: TX
- ERP: 8.95 kW
- Transmitter coordinates: 42°43′53.6″N 114°25′7.1″W

K49AZ (channel 49) was an independent television station in Twin Falls, Idaho, United States, which broadcast from July 16, 1986, to May 20, 1989.

Orion Broadcasting Group of Denver obtained the rights to low-power TV stations on channels 38 and 49 in Twin Falls and sold them to American Community Broadcasting, owned by two legislative consultants from Washington, D.C. American Community Broadcasting sold the channel 38 permit to the King Broadcasting Company, owner of KTVB, the NBC affiliate in Boise, which had been looking for a way to extend its signal to the Magic Valley. It retained channel 49 and built studios on 4th Avenue East and a transmitter on Flat Top Butte near Jerome.

Postponed by technical delays, K49AZ began broadcasting on July 16, 1986, 15 days after K38AS. Most of its programming was obtained via satellite. King Videocable, the local cable television system in Twin Falls and a sister company to King Broadcasting, put the new station on channel 25 and later on channel 19. The station was one of two low-power outlets nationwide—the other in Anchorage, Alaska—to appear in ratings surveys by Nielsen and Arbitron. K49AZ lost $150,000 in its first year of operation; during this time, the station cut half of its staff, and a bingo program was discontinued.

The major issue in K49AZ's life was cable channel positioning. Television sets needed a converter to receive cable channels above 14, limiting K49AZ's potential audience as long as it was on channel 19. K49AZ requested a lower channel position but was denied. The general manager of Boise's KBCI-TV, which was also seeking a better channel placement, stated that he believed the refusal to move K49AZ down was designed to choke it off the air and noted that then-unique conflict of interest concerns arose because King was associated with a broadcast station in the market. At the end of July, Idaho attorney general Jim Jones opened a probe into allegations by K49AZ and Boise's KBCI-TV that King Videocable had claimed the valuable lower-tier channels for channels it sold advertising in, either national cable services or K38AS. Rumors circulated of a possible shutdown, and manager Kris Harvey warned businesses in a letter, "K49 is in extreme financial discomfort. The rumors of our going dark are not unfounded."

To settle the dispute, King Videocable agreed in November 1987 to move K49AZ to channel 2 on its system, It was placed on the channel in the final days of 1987 and could keep the position if it remained among the 12 most-watched channels on the system after 12 months. Ratings increased slightly, enough to attract barter programs—those that include national advertising at no cost to the station. Also added were more cartoons and telecasts of Utah Jazz basketball.

The low cable position did not provide sufficient financial support to keep the station in business. On May 20, 1989, American Community Broadcasting shut K49AZ down due to poor advertising revenue. Station manager Gala Tigue told the Times-News that the decision had been made by the corporate office and "has been a long time coming". Broadcasting equipment was sold and leased office equipment was returned.
