= KSAW =

KSAW may refer to:

- KSAW-LD, a low-power television station (channel 28, virtual 6) licensed to serve Twin Falls, Idaho, United States
- Sawyer International Airport (ICAO code KSAW)
