= Local 8 =

Local 8 can refer to the moniker used by the following stations:

- KFMB-TV, a CBS affiliate in San Diego, California (used from 2001 to 2005)
- KIFI-TV, an ABC affiliate in Idaho Falls, Idaho
- WVLT-TV, a CBS affiliate in Knoxville, Tennessee (used from 2011 to 2018)
