= KTLE =

Television station in Pocatello, Idaho (1959–1971)

- Pocatello, Idaho; United States
- Channels: Analog: 6 (VHF)

Programming
- Affiliations: NBC (1959–1961); Independent (1962–1964, 1969–1971)

Ownership
- Owner: KBLI Inc.

History
- First air date: July 3, 1959
- Last air date: May 1971

Technical information
- ERP: 70.7 kW
- HAAT: 302 m (990 ft)
- Transmitter coordinates: 42°52′26″N 112°30′47″W

KTLE (channel 6) was a television station in Pocatello, Idaho, United States. It operated from July 3, 1959, to January 23, 1961, as an NBC affiliate and as an independent station for brief stints in August 1962; from November 1963 to February 1964; and February 1969 to about May 1971. KTLE was owned by KBLI Inc. and maintained studios at 928 North Main Street in Pocatello and a transmitter west of the city.

The station's history was dominated by NBC's decision, finalized in November 1960, to move its affiliation from KTLE to KIFI-TV, a new station being set up in Idaho Falls with a better signal NBC felt was more acceptable to the network's advertisers. KIFI debuted on January 23, 1961, and KTLE left the air that night. The station's operations in several periods after that time were sporadic, with minimal programming and no network affiliation. The Federal Communications Commission designated its broadcast license for hearing with a competing challenger in 1968; KBLI Inc. withdrew its efforts to have the license renewed in 1971, thus clearing the way for KPVI to debut on the channel in 1974.

== History ==
On March 19, 1958, KBLI Inc. applied with the Federal Communications Commission (FCC) for a construction permit to build channel 6 in Pocatello. KBLI Inc. was majority-owned by Granite District Radio Broadcasting Company, the owner of KBLI in Blackfoot and KNAK in Salt Lake City. This was not the first attempt at channel 6, as another group had filed for it in 1956. The construction permit was granted in October 1958.

KTLE made its on-air debut on July 3, 1959, with special coverage of the arrival of a wagon train in Pocatello. Even when it went on the air, the station faced difficulty broadcasting network programming in its early days due to interference from electrical systems. The station was an affiliate of NBC and offered viewers nightly news and sports coverage.

NBC announced on November 7, 1960, that it had signed an agreement to affiliate exclusively with a new Idaho Falls–based station, KIFI-TV (channel 8), which was under construction at the time. At the same time, KTLE was informed of its impending loss of NBC affiliation. It was claimed that KIFI offered a better, full-power signal to Eastern Idaho. NBC also alleged that Idaho Falls was an easier sell than Pocatello to network sponsors, to which KTLE executive director L. John Miner noted that Pocatello had not been a city with a station until channel 6 signed on, compared to Idaho Falls, which already had KID-TV (channel 3). As KIFI prepared to launch, it pressured many of KTLE's engineers to leave channel 6 and join the new channel 8, raising the prospect that the station might have to leave the air before KIFI was ready; national advertisers also began canceling their contracts with channel 6 after the disaffiliation was announced. KTLE attempted to obtain ABC affiliation in a final effort to keep the station viable, but ABC was already affiliated with KID-TV.

KIFI-TV began broadcasting on January 23, 1961. That same day was also KTLE's last: it left the air "to conserve the assets" of the company, per manager Gloria Dillard, in the wake of losing its NBC affiliation. Features of the last day included a roundtable discussion of KBLI Inc. officers discussing the station's closure and an editorial explaining the closure.

After the closure, KBLI Inc. sued KIFI-TV, KID-TV, and NBC in Utah federal court on antitrust grounds. The lawsuit was settled in November 1961; KBLI Inc. received $50,000, a special moratorium on more to $42,000 it owed to RCA, and limited NBC affiliation for KTLE when it resumed telecasting. Three stockholders sued KBLI Inc. alleging a series of misrepresentations in the offering of stock in the firm as well as "mismanage[ment of] the affairs of [KTLE] in a careless and negligent manner" that caused the affiliation loss. During this time, Idaho State College expressed interest in reserving the channel 6 facility for educational television.

KTLE finally made its return to the air on August 15, 1962, on what Dillard called an "emergency" basis to save the license. The station's operation at this phase was limited, consisting entirely of filmed material with no network affiliation and no commercials. Though the station was eligible to receive some NBC programming as a result of the settlement, its ability to air those programs depended on national advertising. The station soon left the air again. A second return attempt was mounted in November 1963, utilizing educational film programming from Idaho State College and the University of Utah. Around February 9, 1964, trouble developed at KTLE's tower, and the station opted to remain off the air until a sale or liquidation, with Dillard citing a lack of interest from local advertisers that preferred to advertise on KID-TV or KIFI.

In May 1968, KBLI Inc. stockholders offered Snake River Valley Television, Inc., an option to acquire KTLE's assets. Meanwhile, in September 1968, the Eastern Idaho Television Corporation of Salt Lake City applied for the channel. Three months later, in an unusual move, the FCC set the KTLE renewal application for comparative hearing against the one from Eastern Idaho Television Corporation, which at the same time sought channel 6 at Nampa. With the hearing in progress, KTLE again returned to the air in a limited capacity on February 13, 1969. As before, the station had no network affiliation and was limited to a broadcast day of about four hours, with some local programming and films on a non-commercial basis. During the hearing, Johnson testified that ABC had agreed to affiliate with the winner of the Pocatello channel 6 battle. KTLE was on the air as late as May 1971 but closed when Snake River Valley opted not to purchase the assets.

In an initial decision issued August 20, 1971, FCC examiner David Kraushaar dismissed the KTLE application with prejudice—the license having been surrendered for cancellation—and approved a grant of channel 6 to Eastern Idaho Television. This followed a decision by KBLI the month before not to pursue the renewal of the KTLE license, as well as a 1969 decision by the FCC review board to enlarge the comparative proceeding and consider character defects stemming from the FCC's non-renewal of the related KSHO-TV in Las Vegas. Eastern Idaho Television opted to build entirely new facilities and began broadcasting on April 26, 1974, as ABC affiliate KPVI.
