= KXTF =

Television station in Twin Falls, Idaho

- Twin Falls, Idaho; United States
- Channels: Digital: 34 (UHF); Virtual: 35

Programming
- Affiliations: 35.1: TCT; for others, see § Subchannels

Ownership
- Owner: Total Christian Television; (Tri-State Christian TV, Inc.)

History
- Founded: March 7, 1988
- First air date: January 31, 1989
- Former call signs: KKVI (1989–1997)
- Former channel numbers: Analog: 35 (UHF, 1989–2009); Digital: 35 (UHF, 2009–2020)
- Former affiliations: ABC (1989–1996); Fox (secondary 1989–1996, primary 1996–2012); This TV (2012–2013); Dark (2013–March 2014, May 2014–2015); Cozi TV (March−May 2014, 2015–2017)
- Call sign meaning: Fox/Christ ("X") Twin Falls (in reference to former affiliation)

Technical information
- Licensing authority: FCC
- Facility ID: 1255
- ERP: 230 kW
- HAAT: 162 m (531 ft)
- Transmitter coordinates: 42°43′41.6″N 114°24′46.1″W

Links
- Public license information: Public file; LMS
- Website: www.tct.tv

KXTF (channel 35) is a religious television station in Twin Falls, Idaho, United States, owned by Total Christian Television (TCT). The station's transmitter is located on Flat Top Butte in unincorporated Jerome County east of Jerome and US 93.

== History ==
Former KXTF logo, used until June 30, 2012.

The station originally signed on the air in January 1989 as KKVI, operating as a satellite station of Pocatello ABC affiliate KPVI; it also carried Fox as a secondary affiliation during the late evening hours. This arrangement ended when KPVI ended its ABC affiliation to become an NBC affiliate in 1996. KKVI could not operate as an NBC affiliate because the network's Boise affiliate KTVB provided NBC network programming to Twin Falls via a low-power broadcast translator. The station then chose to switch to Fox full-time.

KXTF discontinued its Fox affiliation on July 1, 2012, following a dispute with the network over retransmission consent; several other stations lost their Fox affiliations a year earlier for similar reasons. The station subsequently affiliated with This TV; Pocatello sister station KFXP also lost its affiliation on that date and also joined This TV (MyNetworkTV affiliate KXPI-LD, which is repeated on the second digital channel of CBS affiliate KIDK, took over the Fox affiliation for the Pocatello–Idaho Falls market). Unlike KFXP, which restricted This TV programming to the morning and overnight time periods (with general entertainment programming airing in daytime and primetime slots), KXTF carried This TV's entire programming schedule. The Fox affiliation in Twin Falls moved to MyNetworkTV affiliate KTWT-LP as a primary affiliation (MyNetworkTV effectively moved to secondary status).

KXTF went dark on March 18, 2013, due to the end of its lease of its studio facilities on North Blue Lakes Boulevard in Twin Falls, which were demolished on April 1. It returned to the air from studios on Second Street in March 2014 as an affiliate of Cozi TV. Intermountain West Communications Company reached a deal to sell KXTF and KPVI-DT to Broadcast Partners in June 2013; Idaho Broadcast Partners is a subsidiary of Frontier Radio Management. The sale was completed on May 13, 2014. Ten days later, on May 23, 2014, KXTF again ceased broadcasting, citing technical problems; the station returned in May 2015, still affiliated with Cozi TV.

On January 29, 2016, Frontier Radio Management sold Idaho Broadcast Partners to NBI Holdings, LLC, which owns Northwest Broadcasting. The sale was completed on March 24. In November 2017, Northwest Broadcasting agreed to donate KXTF to Total Christian Television. After the donation, the station became a TCT O&O, adding TCT HD and TCT Kids to its subchannels.

== Newscasts ==
KXTF simulcast KPVI on Fox News at 9, a half-hour 9 p.m. newscast produced for Pocatello sister station KFXP by NBC affiliate KPVI-DT (which operated KFXP through an operational agreement with owner Compass Communications). As a result of both stations disaffiliating from Fox on July 1, 2012, the newscast was canceled with the last broadcast airing on June 30, 2012. The station eventually began airing KPVI More at 5:30 p.m. weeknights, but the program contained no weather or sports updates and focused on features, rather than day-to-day news coverage.

== Subchannels ==
The station's signal is multiplexed:

Subchannels of KXTF
Channel	Res.	Short name	Programming
35.1	1080i	KXTF HD	TCT
35.2	480i	SBN	SonLife
35.3	480i	ONTV4U	OnTV4U
35.4	480i	Start	Start TV
35.5	480i	GDT	Infomercials
35.6	480i	BizTV	Biz TV
