= Beulah Ream Allen =

American nurse and physician (1897–1989)

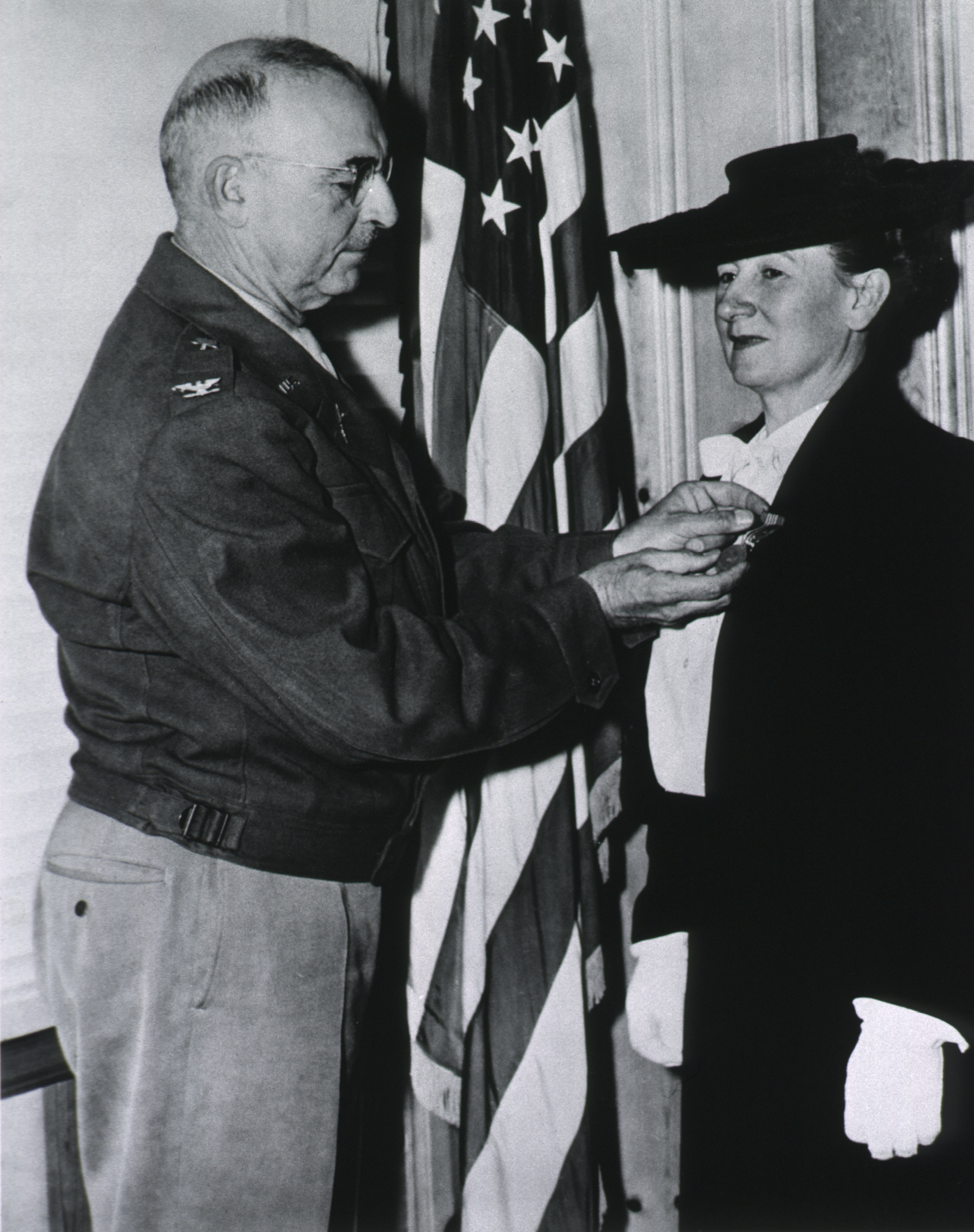
- Allen being given the Medal of Freedom
- Born: Beulah Estelle Ream; January 26, 1897; Dingle, Idaho, U.S.
- Died: March 17, 1989 (aged 92); Mesa, Arizona, U.S.
- Other name: Beulah Allen Jarvis
- Education: Academy of Idaho; Illinois Training School for Nurses; University of Utah; University of California, San Francisco (MD)
- Occupations: Nurse; Physician
- Years active: 1922–1979
- Spouse: Henderson Wilcox Allen Sr. (married 1937) (Died 1942)
- Children: Lee Allen (1938-2016), Henderson (Hendy) Allen Jr. (1942-1963)
- Awards: Medal of Freedom (1946)

Beulah Ream Allen (January 26, 1897 – March 17, 1989) was an American nurse, physician, and civilian physician during World War II. After graduating with a nursing degree in 1922, she worked as a supervising nurse and headed the educational department for the LDS Hospital in Salt Lake City. She worked as a hospital inspector for the state of Utah until 1928, when she moved to San Francisco to attend medical school. While earning her degree at the University of California, San Francisco, she worked as a nurse in the Bay Area. Upon her graduation in 1932, she moved to the Philippines, where she opened a medical practice.

During World War II, she volunteered as a civilian surgeon for the United States Army. She was stationed in Baguio and was responsible for the care of nearly 30 soldiers, when the rest of the Army retreated to the Bataan Peninsula. Taken prisoner in 1941, she was held in three internment camps before being liberated. Returning to the United States, she resumed her practice in the Bay Area. She was awarded the Medal of Freedom in 1946. In 1960, she moved her practice to Provo, Utah, where she served as dean of the Brigham Young University College of Nursing until 1964. Allen retired in 1979 and in that year married and relocated to Mesa, Arizona, where she lived until her death in 1989.

== Early life and education ==
Beulah Estelle Ream was born on January 26, 1897, in Dingle, Idaho, to Nora Ellen (née Crockett) and William Dewine Ream. She was raised on her father's farm with a large family of siblings including: William Wesley (1886), Mitchell Alvin (1888), Lee Emerson (1890), Fabian Dewine (1891), Ida Nora (1893), George Douglas (1895), John Rodney (1900), Milton Parke (1901) and Kenneth Durward (1903). She attended public schools and graduated from the Academy of Idaho in 1916 with teaching credentials. She began teaching in 1917, but the outbreak of the 1918 flu epidemic led her to enroll in nursing school at the Illinois Training School for Nurses (program merged in 1926 into the University of Chicago's School of Nursing and ceased to exist in 1929). She completed her registered nurse requirements in 1922.

== Career ==
=== Nursing and further education (1922–1932) ===
After her graduation in 1922, Ream moved to Salt Lake City, Utah, where she worked at the LDS Hospital as a supervising nurse until 1923. She then served as head of the education department until 1925 and worked as a nurse, before becoming a hospital inspector for the State of Utah between 1927 and 1928. Keen to improve her ability to assist her patients, Ream decided to return to school to become a physician and completed her bachelor's degree in 1928 at the University of Utah. She then transferred to the University of California, San Francisco, where she worked as a nurse in the Bay Area until earning her Doctor of Medicine degree in 1932. She completed her internship at the Women's and Children's Hospital of San Francisco.

=== Physician in the Philippines (1933–1945) ===
Upon her graduation, Ream traveled to the Philippines to visit her brother Fabian and his family. In addition to setting up a private practice in Manila, from 1934 she served as the chief medical officer of the Mary Johnston Hospital. In 1937, she married Major Henderson Wilcox "Sam" Allen, a U.S. Army officer from Kentucky. In 1940, their son Lee was born. Although she could have been evacuated because of the impending Japanese invasion of the Philippines, Allen chose to remain with her husband. He received a medical discharge in December 1941, but, before the family could leave, the attack on Pearl Harbor occurred and Sam was called back to active duty.

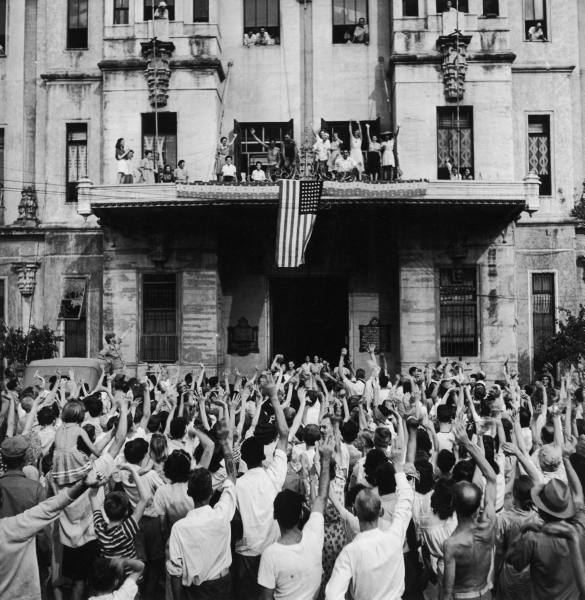
Santo Tomas Internment Camp Liberation, 1945

On December 8, 1941, Japanese bombers began an air raid at Baguio in the Philippines, where the Allens had made their home. Establishing a makeshift hospital to care for the wounded, Allen volunteered her services to the Army as a civilian physician-surgeon. When the rest of the army retreated to the Bataan Peninsula, she was responsible for the care of nearly 30 soldiers. After the Battle of Bataan in April 1942, her husband was captured and forced to make the Bataan Death March. Henderson Allen died June 17, 1942, in the Cabanatuan Internment Camp without seeing his family again. Allen was captured in late 1941 and initially interned with her son at Camp John Hay. She worked as part of the medical staff at the camp hospital. On April 20, 1942, they were moved by bus with other westerners to Camp Holmes Internment Camp, where her second son, Henderson Rey, was born on July 4, 1942. (Note: Frederic Harper Stevens' notes on the Santo Tomás Internment Camp indicate Henderson was born on July 7. He and his wife Patricia (née Ostland) died in a car accident in 1963.) While in captivity, Allen had to pay "$75 for a pound of oatmeal, $300 for a pound of sugar and $25 for one egg."

As before, Allen worked in the camp hospital, but had a difficult relationship with its head, Dr. Dana Nance. Allen pressed for improved sanitation controls to limit the cases of dysentery and disease among the camp chickens, (Note: The Deseret News & Telegram calls the disease the chickens suffered beri-beri as well as "limberneck". Mississippi State University's agricultural extension identifies that "limberneck" is caused by botulism. Because Allen's treatment of the disease using yeast was successful, and yeast is a rich source of vitamin B1, thiamin deficiency seems likely.) suggesting that all garbage be buried. She pushed for the isolation of new internees until it could be determined if they had communicable diseases. Nance ignored her suggestions, as well as her recommendation for the staff to move outside of the hospital so that the patients were not housed in tents. Conditions in the camp were poor and inadequate food supplies often led to malnutrition. Allen gave yeast supplements to the patients to improve their health.

Frustrated that women were not allowed to vote on the General Committee that operated the camp, Allen organized a Women's Committee and demanded that the General Committee include both men and women in camp governance. The committee polled the prison population, and though Allen's proposal won the majority of votes, the General Committee ignored the result and maintained a men-only voting policy. Eventually all of Allen's proposals were adopted at the camp, but she was no longer there to see the result. After 18 months of captivity, she asked for a transfer and took her boys to the Santo Tomas Internment Camp, where there was a shortage of physicians, in early 1943.

Conditions at Santo Tomas were dire. By 1943, the shortages of drugs, sheets, blankets, mosquito nets and other basic supplies impacted the ability to treat patients. Relief supplies did not arrive until December 1943, requiring doctors to search for substitute medical treatments, but were again at critical shortage levels by the end of 1944 and starvation was a serious problem. There was no food source or regular supply of food, except from the Red Cross. Though obligated to feed the prisoners, the Japanese commandant was unable to secure adequate funds. The General Committee asked for 55 cents per person per day, but the authorities were willing to grant only 35 cents. By late 1944, food supplies were so scarce that inmates were eating vegetable peelings, and the garbage disposal crews became obsolete.

When Allen arrived, she was appointed to several committees and at various times headed the camp's children's hospital. She was assigned to serve both the children’s hospital and the isolation hospital along with D. Chambers, F. O. Smith, and Evelyn M. Withoff. In addition to her appointment on the Medical Board, Allen served on the Food Committee, Committee on Releases to Outside Hospitals, and Public Health Committee and was elected to the Parents' Association Board. On February 3, 1945, the camp was liberated by American troops. Within a few weeks, the Allen family were headed back to the United States, arriving in San Francisco on March 30, 1945. They were welcomed by Allen's family, the Reams. After her homecoming, an article in the Oakland Tribune called Allen "a real heroine...who worked 'sometimes night and day' caring for the sick".

Allen was awarded the Medal of Freedom (later known as the Presidential Medal of Freedom) (Note: The Medal of Freedom was established by President Harry S. Truman in 1945. It is the highest civilian honor awarded in the United States. In 1963, President John F. Kennedy reestablished the award and renamed it the Presidential Medal of Freedom.) by General Douglas MacArthur. In 1947, she accepted the Soldier's Medal and Bronze Star Medal on behalf of her husband's service.

=== Later career (1945–1979) ===
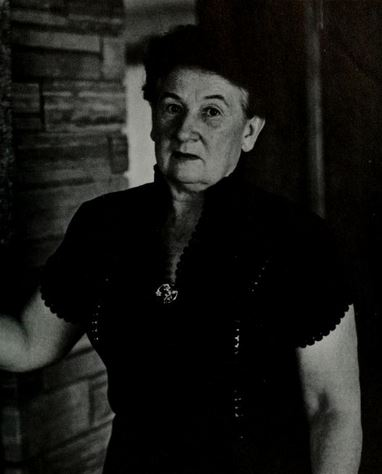
Allen, Dean of Nursing, 1962

Allen re-established her medical practice in California. Initially, she worked with her brother Dr. Milton P. Ream, who lived in San Leandro and saw patients in Oakland. She established a home for her sons and her mother in San Francisco and worked in San Francisco, Cupertino, and Palo Alto. She returned to the University of California, taking post-graduate courses.

In 1960, she was hired as the dean of the Brigham Young University College of Nursing and moved to Provo, Utah. In this capacity, she instituted an associate degree program for nursing students, which began to be offered in fall semester of 1963. After four years in the post, she returned to private practice until her retirement in 1979. That year, at the age of 82, she married Joseph Smith Jarvis and moved to Mesa, Arizona.

== Death and legacy ==
She died on March 17, 1989, in Mesa. Her funeral was held March 20 at the Oak Hills 4th Ward Chapel in Provo, before she was interred at the Golden Gate National Cemetery, in San Bruno, California. In 2001, Lucinda and Helen Bateman published Beulah, the Good Doctor: A Biography of Beulah Ream Allen.
