= KVUI =

Television station in Pocatello, Idaho

- Pocatello–Idaho Falls, Idaho; United States
- City: Pocatello, Idaho
- Channels: Digital: 31 (UHF); Virtual: 31
- Branding: KVUI 31

Programming
- Affiliations: 31.1: Ion Television; for others, see § Subchannels

Ownership
- Owner: Ventura Broadcasting; (Ventura Media Communications, LLC)
- Sister stations: KPIF

History
- First air date: July 16, 1998
- Former call signs: KBDL (1998); KFXP (1998–2015)
- Former channel numbers: Analog: 31 (UHF, 1998–2008)
- Former affiliations: Fox (1998–2012); UPN (secondary, 1998–2000); This TV (2012–2013); Dark (2013–2015); MeTV (2015–2017)

Technical information
- Licensing authority: FCC
- Facility ID: 78910
- ERP: 68.5 kW
- HAAT: 447 m (1,467 ft)
- Transmitter coordinates: 42°55′15″N 112°20′47″W

Links
- Public license information: Public file; LMS

KVUI (channel 31) is a television station licensed to Pocatello, Idaho, United States, serving the Idaho Falls–Pocatello market as an affiliate of Ion Television. It is owned by Ventura Broadcasting alongside Grit affiliate KPIF (channel 15, also licensed to Pocatello). The two stations share studios on West Alameda Road in Pocatello; KVUI's transmitter is located on Howard Mountain.

== History ==
Channel 31 signed on the air as KFXP, the Fox affiliate for the Pocatello–Idaho Falls market, on July 16, 1998. Prior to the station's launch, Fox programming had been seen on area cable systems via Foxnet; the network also maintained a secondary affiliation with CBS affiliate KIDK (channel 3). KFXP was originally owned by a partnership of three companies—Redwood Broadcasting, Winstar Communications, and Compass Communications—that had competed for the license; through a time brokerage agreement, the station was operated by Sunbelt Communications (later known as Intermountain West Communications Company), owner of NBC outlet KPVI (channel 6), and the two stations shared studios in Pocatello. By 1999, Compass Communications had acquired Redwood and Winstar's interests in KFXP. In its early years, channel 31 had a secondary affiliation with UPN; however, this had ended by 2000.

KFXP discontinued its Fox affiliation on July 1, 2012, following a dispute with the network over retransmission consent; several other stations lost their Fox affiliations a year earlier for similar reasons. The station subsequently affiliated with This TV (previously shown on KPVI-DT3) effective on that date with the network airing during the morning and overnight hours, though it retained general entertainment programming during daytime and prime time hours. Twin Falls sister station KXTF also lost its affiliation and switched to This TV on the same date, with Fox programming moving to MyNetworkTV affiliate KTWT-LD as a primary affiliation. MyNetworkTV affiliate KXPI-LD (channel 34, which is repeated on KIDK-DT2) assumed the Fox affiliation and retained MyNetworkTV as a secondary affiliation.

KFXP went dark on July 1, 2013 following the end of its lease on its transmission tower; a new lease on the tower cannot be negotiated until the completion of an ownership change for the tower. The time brokerage agreement with KPVI-DT was also terminated as of the preceding day; it had been slated to expire on July 16. KFXP had begun showing a still announcing the shutdown on June 24, 2013. On January 31, 2014, Compass Communications reached a deal to sell KFXP, along with two commonly-owned low-power stations in Beaumont, Texas, to Abraham Telecasting Company, however, the sale fell through. On June 12, 2015, Compass agreed to sell KFXP to Buckalew Media for $450,000. The sale was completed on October 30; on November 9, Buckalew changed the station's call letters to KVUI. Buckalew then announced that it would relaunch KVUI by December 1 as a MeTV affiliate; the station also intends to air some local programming.

Buckalew Media agreed to sell KVUI, along with the construction permit for KVUT-LD in Twin Falls, to Ventura TV Video Appliance Center for $575,000 on January 20, 2017.

== Newscasts ==
Shortly after sign-on, KFXP partnered with KPVI to provide a 9 p.m. newscast on Monday through Friday nights. The program was canceled after a few years and entertainment programming returned to the timeslot. KFXP partnered with KPVI once again in 2006 to produce a late evening newscast at 9 p.m. that debuted on October 30, 2006, entitled KPVI on Fox News at 9; this newscast was also broadcast on Twin Falls sister station KXTF. In preparation for the discontinuance of its Fox affiliation and the switch to This TV, the station canceled the 9 p.m. newscast for a second time, with its last broadcast airing on June 29, 2012; it was replaced with a new weeknight 5:30 p.m. newscast produced by KPVI, that debuted in September 2012. The 5:30 p.m. program was titled KPVI More, an interview and features program that aired simultaneously on KXTF. It contained no weather or sports segments.

== Technical information ==
=== Subchannels ===
The station's signal is multiplexed:

Subchannels of KVUI
Channel	Res.	Short name	Programming
31.1	720p	ION	Ion Television
31.2	480i	Grit	Grit
31.3	480i	HNI	Heroes & Icons
31.4	480i	Cozi	Cozi TV
31.5	480i	Great	Great (4:3)
31.6	480i	Mystery	Ion Mystery
31.7	480i	MVSGLD	MovieSphere Gold
31.8	480i	StartTV	Start TV
31.9	480i	HSN	HSN
31.10	480i	Buzzr	Buzzr
31.11	480i	Antenna	Antenna TV
31.12	480i	RNowTV	Right Now TV
31.13	480i	ShopLC	Shop LC

=== Analog-to-digital conversion ===
KVUI (as KFXP) shut down its analog signal, over UHF channel 31, on November 17, 2008. The station "flash-cut" its digital signal into operation UHF channel 31. Because it was granted an original construction permit after the FCC finalized the DTV allotment plan on April 21, 1997, the station did not receive a companion channel for a digital television station.
