= KIDA =

TV station in Sun Valley, Idaho

- Sun Valley–Twin Falls, Idaho; United States
- City: Sun Valley, Idaho
- Channels: Analog: 5 (VHF); Digital: 32 (UHF) (never built)

Programming
- Affiliations: UPN (2003–2004); Independent (2004–2009)

Ownership
- Owner: Marcia T. Turner d/b/a Turner Enterprises

History
- Founded: October 5, 2000
- First air date: August 22, 2003
- Last air date: June 12, 2009; (5 years, 294 days)
- Call sign meaning: Idaho

Technical information
- Facility ID: 81570
- ERP: 78 kW
- HAAT: 906 m (2,972 ft)
- Transmitter coordinates: 43°38′36″N 114°23′49″W

KIDA (channel 5) was an independent television station licensed to Sun Valley, Idaho, United States, which served the Twin Falls area. Founded October 25, 2000, the station was owned by Turner Enterprises.

== History ==
The station carried programming from UPN at its sign-on; however, it had lost the affiliation to KTWT-LP by December 2004. Later, programming consisted primarily of infomercials. Neither Cox Communications in Sun Valley or Cable One in Twin Falls included KIDA in their channel lineups.

Because it was granted an original construction permit after the FCC finalized the DTV allotment plan on April 21, 1997, the station did not receive a companion channel for a digital television station. Instead, on or before June 12, 2009, which was the end of the digital TV conversion period for full-service stations, KIDA would have been required to turned off its analog signal and turn on its digital signal (called a "flash cut").

The station had a pre-digital transition allotment for digital channel 32, but never utilized it. Marcia Turner, doing business as Turner Enterprises, filed for special temporary authority to remain silent on June 18, 2009, citing financial reasons and its inability to construct the digital facilities required by June 12, 2009. However, KIDA did not even apply for a construction permit for such facilities, and as a result, the FCC dismissed the STA and revoked its license on October 6, 2009.
