= KPVI-DT =

Television station in Pocatello, Idaho

- Pocatello–Idaho Falls, Idaho; United States
- City: Pocatello, Idaho
- Channels: Digital: 23 (UHF); Virtual: 6
- Branding: KPVI

Programming
- Affiliations: 6.1: NBC; 6.2: Catchy Comedy; 6.3: Movies!

Ownership
- Owner: Deltavision Media; (Pocatello License LLC)

History
- First air date: April 26, 1974
- Former call signs: KPVI (1974–2009)
- Former channel numbers: Analog: 6 (VHF, 1974–2009)
- Former affiliations: ABC (1974–1996); UPN (secondary, 1995–1996)
- Call sign meaning: Pocatello "VI" = Roman numeral 6

Technical information
- Licensing authority: FCC
- Facility ID: 1270
- ERP: 505 kW
- HAAT: 398.4 m (1,307 ft)
- Transmitter coordinates: 42°55′12.5″N 112°20′47.6″W

Links
- Public license information: Public file; LMS
- Website: www.kpvi.com

KPVI-DT (channel 6) is a television station licensed to Pocatello, Idaho, United States, serving as the NBC affiliate for the Idaho Falls–Pocatello market. Owned by Deltavision Media, the station maintains studios on East Sherman Street in downtown Pocatello. Its transmitter is situated on a mountain top about four miles (6.4 km) east-northeast of the Pocatello city limits; this location was chosen because of possible interference from KIVI-TV in Boise, which also broadcast its analog signal on channel 6. At one time, KPVI and KIVI were sister stations (hence the Roman numerals) with the same affiliation (ABC, until 1996). KPVI broadcast its analog signal at 100 kW.

== History ==
=== ABC affiliation ===
KPVI signed on April 26, 1974, as an ABC affiliate. It was originally owned by Eastern Idaho Television Corporation, which also owned sister station KIVI-TV in Boise, Idaho. Previously, ABC had been carried on a shared basis by both CBS affiliate KID-TV (channel 3, now KIDK) and NBC affiliate KIFI-TV. Idaho Television Company sold both KPVI and sister station KIVI to Futura Titanium Corporation in 1977 for $655,850.

On August 23, 1983, Ambassador Media, a newly formed entity controlled by U.S. Senator William L. Armstrong and KPVI's then-general manager Brian Hogan, announced it would be purchasing KPVI from Futura for $2.7 million. Additionally, Ambassador would pay Futura stockholders $500,000 as part of an agreement to not compete with Ambassador through the purchase or establishment of another television station in the Idaho Falls-Pocatello market. Futura had already divested KIVI two years earlier. Hogan stated that the name of the company came from scripture — that Armstrong felt that the new company was "going to be ambassadors to God," as Hogan put it.

In early 1995, KPVI became a secondary affiliate of UPN; it cleared the network's highest-rated program, Star Trek: Voyager, as a replacement for NYPD Blue, which it deemed to be too vulgar for airing in the Pocatello market. In April 1995, Sunbelt Communications Company purchased KPVI and satellite stations KJVI in Jackson, Wyoming and KKVI in Twin Falls from Ambassador. The FCC approved the sale on September 29.

=== Switch to NBC ===
The three stations remained with ABC until January 1996 when KPVI and KJVI switched to NBC, swapping affiliations with KIFI. Since NBC programming in Twin Falls was provided by Boise NBC affiliate KTVB via translator, KKVI (which had served as a secondary affiliate of Fox since its 1989 sign-on) dropped its affiliation with ABC and became a full Fox affiliate. As a result, the secondary UPN affiliation that KPVI carried was moved to KIDK, where it would remain until KXPI-LP signed on in 2001. KJVI, which became KJWY several months later, remained a semi-satellite of KPVI until it was sold to PMCM TV, LLC in 2009. As a result of the sale to Sunbelt, the station moved in the mid-1990s from a smaller downtown facility to a newly remodeled facility on East Sherman Street. Saturday Night Live star Molly Shannon was the guest of honor at the official grand opening of the facility.

Intermountain West Communications Company reached a deal to sell KPVI and KXTF to Idaho Broadcast Partners in June 2013; Idaho Broadcast Partners is a subsidiary of Frontier Radio Management. The sale was completed on May 13, 2014.

On January 29, 2016, Frontier Radio Management sold Idaho Broadcast Partners to NBI Holdings, LLC, which owns Northwest Broadcasting. The sale was completed on March 24.

In February 2019, Reuters reported that Apollo Global Management had agreed to acquire the entirety of Brian Brady's television portfolio, which it intended to merge with Cox Media Group (which Apollo was acquiring at the same time), once the purchases were approved by the FCC. In March 2019 filings with the FCC, Apollo confirmed that its newly formed broadcasting group, Terrier Media, would acquire Northwest Broadcasting, with Brian Brady holding an unspecified minority interest in Terrier. In June 2019, it was announced that Terrier Media would instead operate as Cox Media Group, as Apollo had reached a deal to also acquire Cox's radio and advertising businesses. The transaction was completed on December 17.

On March 29, 2022, Cox Media Group announced it would sell KPVI-DT and 17 other stations to Imagicomm Communications, an affiliate of the parent company of the INSP cable channel, for $488 million; the sale was completed on August 1. On April 8, 2025, Imagicomm announced that KPVI-DT would be acquired by Webb Collums' Deltavision Media; the deal was consummated on August 15.

== News operation ==
Due to an ailing economy in January 2011, KPVI announced significant layoffs affecting people in every department at the station, including twelve members of the station's news department. In addition to personnel cuts, the station also eliminated all weekend newscasts. The announcement of layoffs came nearly a week after former news director and main anchor, Brenda Baumgartner, announced her resignation. Baumgartner's co-anchor and assistant news director, Todd Blackinton took over as the new news director at the station. The changes at KPVI came less than a month after CBS affiliate KIDK said they would lay off 27 of its 43 employees as they entered a staff-sharing agreement with ABC affiliate KIFI-TV.

KPVI produced KPVI on Fox News at 9, a weeknight 9 p.m. newscast seen on local Fox affiliate KFXP and its sister station, KXTF in Twin Falls. However, the newscast was discontinued on July 1, 2012, when KFXP and KXTF's Fox affiliations ended. The news broadcast for KFXP moved to 5:30 pm effective on Monday, July 2, 2012.

== Technical information ==
=== Subchannels ===
The station's signal is multiplexed:

Subchannels of KPVI-DT
Channel	Res.	Short name	Programming
6.1	1080i	KPVI-HD	NBC
6.2	480i	Catchy	Catchy Comedy
6.3	480i	Movies	Movies!

On January 1, 2012, Antenna TV replaced Universal Sports when it ceased to be available to over-the-air broadcast stations in order to become a cable and satellite-only channel.

On January 13, 2016, Decades replaced Antenna TV.

=== Analog-to-digital conversion ===
KPVI shut down its analog signal, over VHF channel 6, on June 12, 2009, the official date on which full-power television stations in the United States transitioned from analog to digital broadcasts under federal mandate. The station's digital signal remained on its pre-transition UHF channel 23, using virtual channel 6.

=== Translators ===
- K11PP-D Dingle
- K32LS-D Driggs
- K07ZQ-D Georgetown
- K26OP-D Holbrook
- K15IB-D Malad
- K29BM-D Montpelier
- K19KY-D Pocatello
- K13UF-D Rexburg
- K27MW-D Soda Springs
- K12LI-D Thayne, etc. WY
