= KSVT-CD =

Television station in Twin Falls, Idaho

- Twin Falls–Sun Valley, Idaho; United States
- City: Twin Falls, Idaho
- Channels: Digital: 14 (UHF); Virtual: 14
- Branding: KSVT Fox 14; KSVT News

Programming
- Affiliations: 14.1: Fox/MyNetworkTV (secondary); 14.2: Ion

Ownership
- Owner: E. W. Scripps Company; (ION Television License, LLC)
- Sister stations: KMVT, KSAW-LD

History
- Founded: July 14, 1997
- First air date: October 8, 1999
- Former call signs: K43FK (1997–2000); KTWT-LP (2000–2012); KTWT-LD (2012–2014); KSVT-LD (2014–2025)
- Former channel numbers: Analog: 43 (UHF, 1999–2012)
- Former affiliations: Independent (1999–2004); UPN (2004–2006); The CW (2006–March 2012)
- Call sign meaning: Sun Valley Television

Technical information
- Licensing authority: FCC
- Facility ID: 167735
- Class: CD
- ERP: 15 kW
- HAAT: 186 m (610 ft)
- Transmitter coordinates: 42°43′47″N 114°24′55″W
- Translator(s): KMVT 11.3 (VHF)

Links
- Public license information: Public file; LMS

KSVT-CD (channel 14) is a low-power, Class A television station in Twin Falls, Idaho, United States, affiliated with Fox and MyNetworkTV. It is owned by the E. W. Scripps Company alongside CBS affiliate KMVT (channel 11) and ABC affiliate KSAW-LD (channel 6). KSVT-CD and KMVT share studios on Blue Lakes Boulevard North/US 93 in Twin Falls; KSVT-CD's transmitter is located on Flat Top Butte in unincorporated Jerome County east of Jerome and US 93.

In addition to its own digital signal, KSVT-CD is simulcast in standard definition on KMVT's third digital subchannel (11.3) from the same transmitter site.

== History ==
Logo used from March until July 2012.

KSVT signed-on for the first time on October 8, 1999, as independent station K43FK. It became KTWT-LP in 2000. The station was a UPN affiliate from late 2004 (picking up the UPN affiliation from KIDA, channel 5) until September 2006 when UPN merged with The WB (which was seen on KWTE, via The WB 100+) to form The CW. The new network was seen on KTWT (via The CW Plus) until March 2012, when the station switched to MyNetworkTV following the closure of sister station KTID-LP. CW programming remains available through the second digital subchannel of KMVT, which previously simulcast with KTWT.

KTWT joined Fox on July 1, 2012, replacing KXTF (channel 35); the station also converted to digital operation and branded as "Fox 14" (making it one of a handful of digital stations to brand using its physical channel as opposed to its former analog channel); MyNetworkTV programming is shown out-of-pattern weeknights at 10 p.m. KTWT was also added to a new third digital subchannel of KMVT. On February 27, 2014, the station changed its call letters to KSVT-LD to reflect an increased emphasis on Blaine County and the Wood River Valley, including Sun Valley (from which the call letters are derived). (A previous and unrelated low-power TV station in Ketchum had also operated as KSVT-LD, simulcasting with KSVX-CD in Hailey.)

On March 12, 2015, Gray Television announced that it would purchase KSVT-LD and KMVT from Neuhoff Communications for $17.5 million. The sale was completed on July 1.

On July 7, 2025, it was announced that, in an exchange of several stations between Gray Media and the E. W. Scripps Company, KSVT-LD and KMVT would be traded to Scripps, making them sisters to KSAW-LD.

== Newscasts ==
With KTWT's transition to Fox affiliation, there was a significant expansion of the news operation of sister station KMVT. More specifically, the CBS affiliate began producing a half-hour extension of its morning newscast Rise and Shine that is seen weekdays at 7 a.m. on KSVT. In addition, this station added half-hour newscasts at 5 p.m. on weeknights only and every night at 9 p.m. The news broadcasts on KSVT utilize a separate news anchor on weeknights and feature more regional, national and international news of the day compared to the newscasts seen on KMVT. As with local newscasts on KMVT, daily newscasts seen on KSVT-LD are broadcast in high definition. Concurrent with the relaunch as KSVT, Neuhoff Communications announced that the station would open a Wood River Valley bureau.

== Subchannels ==
The station's signal is multiplexed:

Subchannels of KSVT-CD
Subchannel	Res.	Short name	Programming
14.1	720p	KSVT-HD	Fox (primary); MyNetworkTV (secondary)
14.2	720p	Ion-HD	Ion
