= KFXD-TV =

Television station in Nampa, Idaho (1953)

- Nampa, Idaho; United States
- Channels: Analog: 6 (VHF)

Ownership
- Owner: Frank Hurt & Son, Inc.

History
- First air date: June 18, 1953
- Last air date: August 11, 1953

Technical information
- ERP: 500 watts
- HAAT: 2,250 ft (690 m)
- Transmitter coordinates: 43°44′37″N 116°06′51″W

KFXD-TV (channel 6) was a television station in Nampa, Idaho, United States. It was the first television station in the state of Idaho, broadcasting for less than two months in the summer of 1953, between June 18 and August 11. Owned by radio station KFXD (580 AM), it did not have any network affiliation and aired very limited programming. All programs originated from the transmitter site, located at Deer Point in the Boise National Forest.

== History ==
In July 1952, Frank Hurt & Son, Inc., owner of KFXD, filed with the Federal Communications Commission (FCC) to build a new commercial television station on channel 6 in Nampa, proposing a full facility to broadcast at 19,720 watts. The application was granted on March 11, 1953.

After a $25,000 investment, Frank Hurt & Son was cleared to begin operations under special temporary authority (STA) pending construction of its permanent facility. The first television test pattern in Idaho made it onto screens as far away as Weiser and Ontario, Oregon, on June 18, with lieutenant governor Edson Deal helping put the station on the air. Commercial programming followed 11 days later, on June 29. The station used a temporary antenna setup that was unusual. Instead of a tower, the transmitter elements were mounted on a large redwood fence facing the Boise Valley.

However, a series of differences between the television and radio businesses put the station in peril nearly immediately. Though it was announced shortly before signing on that KFXD-TV would be an ABC affiliate, no such hookup ever materialized. Station president and general manager Edward P. Hurt had initially planned to use some of KFXD radio's staffers for the television station. However, the radio station's studios were in downtown Nampa, 20 miles (32 km) from the Deer Point transmitter site, and Hurt discovered that technical necessities and time constraints prevented most of his 18 employees from being available. Hurt also discovered that he would not make any money from the higher-quality programming available at the time; he recalled that while radio stations kept $95 of every $100 in advertising, in television all the money went to "some New York film company".

All of this left KFXD-TV severely underpowered in terms of programming and personnel. It was relegated to a two-man operation—the bare minimum required to operate a station under FCC regulations—run by Hurt and chief engineer Gilbert Rose. Without network or local programming, it only operated for two hours a day, relying on "30 year-old movies", the only programming that was economically available under the circumstances. On some nights, it only aired a test pattern. The next month, a far more organized station brought network television to Idaho when KIDO-TV (channel 7) began operations on July 12 from Boise as a primary NBC affiliate with secondary CBS and DuMont affiliations.

On August 11, with KIDO-TV on air and after less than two months of trying, Hurt gave up, possibly because he did not want to lose money and was used to the financial success of KFXD radio. That day, the station surrendered its STA and filed for authority to go silent, though the underlying construction permit remained in force. The final program was the 1935 movie Confidential. In an interview with Broadcasting magazine, Hurt explained that the limited manpower available to the 500-watt temporary facility made it impossible to run the station under an STA and build out the construction permit at the same time. The design of the station's antenna caused Nampa, 15 miles (24 km) further from the transmitter than Boise, to receive a better signal. Hurt told Television Digest that the station only lost $200 a day because it only operated for two hours daily. The equipment was quickly dismantled and sold; the 500-watt transmitter was used to start up KFXJ-TV in Grand Junction, Colorado.

In late 1953, Hurt filed to sell the KFXD-TV construction permit to Idaho Broadcasting and Television Company, owners of radio station KGEM which had obtained the construction permit to build KTVI on channel 9 and would surrender it to take the KFXD-TV permit. This company had helped KFXD-TV get on air in the first place by providing the interim equipment it used. This was authorized by the FCC in late January 1954, Idaho Broadcasting and Television moved the KTVI call letters to channel 6. By this time, however, KBOI-TV had begun operations on channel 2 as a CBS affiliate. Idaho Broadcasting and Television doubted whether Boise was large enough to support three television stations, and was reluctant to start construction on the new channel 6. It ultimately surrendered the permit, claiming that "the economic situation does not warrant further construction".

In closing down, KFXD-TV was the second television station in the United States, and the first on VHF, to cease operating. It had been preceded by UHF station WROV-TV in Roanoke, Virginia.
