= KIDK =

Television station in Idaho Falls, Idaho

- Idaho Falls–Pocatello, Idaho; United States
- City: Idaho Falls, Idaho
- Channels: Digital: 36 (UHF); Virtual: 3
- Branding: Fox 5 (3.2)

Programming
- Affiliations: 3.1: MeTV; 3.2: Fox; for others, see § Subchannels

Ownership
- Owner: VistaWest Media, LLC
- Operator: News-Press & Gazette Company
- Sister stations: KIFI-TV, KXPI-LD

History
- First air date: December 20, 1953
- Former call signs: KID-TV (1953–1984)
- Former channel number: Analog: 3 (VHF, 1953–2009)
- Former affiliations: CBS (1953–2021); DuMont (secondary, 1953–1955); NBC (secondary, 1953–1961); ABC (secondary, 1953–1974); Fox (secondary, 1994–1998); UPN (secondary, 1996–2003); Dabl (2021–2026); MyNetworkTV (secondary, (????–2026, on 3.2)
- Call sign meaning: Idaho (former call sign) with extra "K"

Technical information
- Licensing authority: FCC
- Facility ID: 56028
- ERP: 200 kW
- HAAT: 458 m (1,503 ft)
- Transmitter coordinates: 43°29′51″N 112°39′53″W
- Translator(s): KXPI-LD 34 Pocatello; for others, see § Translators

Links
- Public license information: Public file; LMS

KIDK (channel 3, cable channel 5) is a television station licensed to Idaho Falls, Idaho, United States, serving the Idaho Falls–Pocatello market as an affiliate of MeTV and Fox. It is owned by VistaWest Media, LLC, and operated by the News-Press & Gazette Company (NPG) alongside ABC, CBS, CW+ and Telemundo affiliate KIFI-TV (channel 8). The two stations share studios on North Yellowstone Highway/US 26 in Idaho Falls; KIDK's transmitter is located on East Butte in unincorporated northern Bingham County along the Idaho National Laboratory border.

KIDK's signal is relayed on low-power translator KXPI-LD (channel 34, owned by NPG outright alongside KIFI-TV) in Pocatello, with transmitter on Howard Mountain in unincorporated Bannock County west of downtown Pocatello.

== History ==
The station debuted on December 20, 1953, as KID-TV, co-owned with KID (590 AM). The station has been a primary affiliate of CBS since its debut, but carried secondary affiliations with the DuMont Television Network until its 1955 shutdown, NBC until 1961 (moving to KIFI-TV thereafter until swapping affiliations with KPVI in 1996) and ABC until 1974 when KPVI became a primary affiliate of the network upon that station's sign on. KID-TV amended its call sign to KIDK on December 18, 1984, when KID AM and KID-FM 96.1 were sold due to an FCC rule in place at the time that prohibited TV and radio stations in the same market, but with different ownership from sharing the same call letters.

After dropping its secondary NBC affiliation, KIDK had an exclusive affiliation with CBS until September 1994, when it began to carry a secondary affiliation with Fox, carrying some of the network's shows in late fringe hours. This allowed the station to continue airing NFL football, which moved to Fox during the 1994 United States broadcast TV realignment; it still carries Fox programming today through its second subchannel along with programming from the MyNetworkTV service. In 1996, KIDK agreed to carry UPN as a third affiliation (KPID-LP, now KXPI-LD, affiliated with the network when it debuted in June 2001; however, KIDK continued its secondary affiliation with the network until 2003). Star Trek: Voyager, the highest-rated UPN program, was cleared in the market on KPVI as station management replaced NYPD Blue, feeling it was too vulgar for local market standards. NYPD Blue aired in its scheduled timeslot on KIFI once it became affiliated with ABC.

On December 9, 2010, Fisher Communications announced that it had entered into a shared services arrangement with News-Press & Gazette Company–owned ABC affiliate KIFI-TV, under which KIDK would be run out of the KIFI facility and 27 KIDK staffers would be laid off. The transaction was completed on January 1, 2011.

On April 11, 2013, Fisher announced that it would sell its stations to the Sinclair Broadcast Group. The deal was completed on August 8, 2013. Shortly beforehand, a deal was reached to sell KIDK and KXPI to VistaWest Media, LLC, a company based in St. Joseph, Missouri (where NPG is also based); the stations would remain operated by NPG under a shared services agreement. The sale was finalized on November 29.

In December 2020, NPG acquired KIDK's non-license assets from VistaWest. As a result, the KIDK intellectual unit moved to KIFI's second digital channel, with Dabl taking over KIDK's main channel. KIDK's operations remained largely unchanged, though over-the-air viewers were asked to rescan their sets in order to continue watching CBS.

== News operation ==
As a result of the SSA between KIDK and KIFI, the former consolidated its news department into KIFI's studios. KIFI then began producing all of KIDK's newscasts. KIDK modified its local news schedule in order to reduce opportunities for direct competition with KIFI. More specifically, KIDK dropped its weekday morning show in favor of CBS Morning News repeats making that station one of a few in the United States that does not provide a local news broadcast in the time slot.

Its separate newscasts airing weeknights at 5 and 6 on KIDK were dropped in favor of one seen at 5:30 while KIFI airs ABC World News Tonight. KIDK provides the CBS Evening News at 5 preceding its local show. KIDK still offers a separate broadcast weeknights at 10 that does compete with KIFI. All local news programming produced for KIDK originates from KIFI's primary set except with modified studio elements, such as duratrans and on-screen graphics, indicating the specific channel airing news.

In order to maintain individual on-air identities and branding, KIDK and KIFI have separate graphic schemes and news music packages. The two maintain primary weeknight personalities (such as news anchors) that only appear on one channel. On weekends, KIFI offers its own early evening newscast at 5 while KIDK follows at 5:30. The two television outlets simulcast together at 10 although the broadcast can be delayed or preempted on one channel due to network obligations.

KIDK airs a nightly prime time newscast on its Fox subchannel known as Channel 3 Eyewitness News at 9 on Fox 5. The show can be seen for 35 minutes on weeknights and a half-hour on weekends. Prior to the SSA formulation with KIFI, KIDK-DT2 also rebroadcast KIDK's weekday morning show at 7. KIFI now produces KIDK-DT2's newscast as a result of the SSA. It competed with another local newscast seen weeknights at 9 on KFXP (that was produced by rival NBC affiliate KPVI-DT, channel 6). However, that thirty-minute show was discontinued on June 30, 2012, as KFXP lost its Fox affiliation a day before KXPI affiliated with the network.

=== Notable former on-air staff ===
- Nadine Woodward – weeknight news anchor (1987–1990); mayor of Spokane, Washington.

== Technical information ==
=== Subchannels ===
The station's signal is multiplexed:

Subchannels of KIDK and KXPI-LD
Subchannel	Res.	Short name	Programming
3.1	480i	MeTV	MeTV
3.2	720p	FoxKXPI	Fox
3.3	480i	Nosey	Nosey (4:3)
3.4	480i	Confess	Confess

=== Analog-to-digital conversion ===
KIDK shut down its analog signal, over VHF channel 3, on June 12, 2009, the official date on which full-power television stations in the United States transitioned from analog to digital broadcasts under federal mandate. The station's digital signal remained on its pre-transition UHF channel 36, using virtual channel 3.

=== Translators ===
In addition to KXPI-LD, KIDK has several translators serving parts of Eastern and Central Idaho, and parts of Western Wyoming.

- K10AW-D Challis
- K09PL-D Dingle, etc.
- K07QC-D Driggs
- K11CP-D Fish Creek
- K21OA-D Holbrook
- KIDK (DRT) 26 Idaho Falls
- K32NV-D Malad City
- K08EZ-D Mink Creek
- K27CS-D Montpelier
- KXPI-LD Pocatello
- K33GF-D Preston
- K34NF-D Soda Springs
- K05GJ-D Thayne, WY
