= KXPI-LD =

KIDK translator in Pocatello, Idaho

Translator of KIDK, Idaho Falls, Idaho
- Pocatello, Idaho; United States
- Channels: Digital: 35 (UHF); Virtual: 3
- Branding: see KIDK

Programming
- Affiliations: 3.1: MeTV; 3.2: Fox

Ownership
- Owner: News-Press & Gazette Company; (NPG of Idaho, Inc.)
- Sister stations: KIDK, KIFI-TV

History
- Founded: June 20, 1997
- First air date: June 26, 2001
- Former call signs: K24EV (1997–February 2001, June 2001–2004); KPID-LP (February–June 2001); KUNP-LP (2004–2006); KPPP-LP (2006–2009); KXPI-LP (2009–2011)
- Former channel numbers: Analog: 24 (UHF, 1997–2011); Digital: 34 (UHF, 2011–2020)
- Former affiliations: As stand-alone station: UPN (2001–2006); TeleFutura (2006–2008); Dark (2008–2009); MyNetworkTV (primary, 2009–2012)
- Call sign meaning: Fox Pocatello, Idaho

Technical information
- Licensing authority: FCC
- Facility ID: 28231
- Class: LD
- ERP: 15 kW
- HAAT: 304.6 m (999 ft)
- Transmitter coordinates: 42°52′25.6″N 112°30′48.9″W

Links
- Public license information: LMS
- Website: www.localnews8.com

KXPI-LD (channel 3) is a low-power television station in Pocatello, Idaho, United States. Owned by News-Press & Gazette Company (NPG), it is a translator of Idaho Falls–licensed MeTV/Fox affiliate KIDK, channel 3 (which is owned by VistaWest Media, LLC but operated by NPG under a shared services agreement [SSA]); it is also a sister station to ABC affiliate KIFI-TV, channel 8 (also licensed to Idaho Falls), which NPG owns outright. KXPI-LD's transmitter is located on Howard Mountain in unincorporated Bannock County west of downtown Pocatello; its parent station shares studios with KIFI-TV on North Yellowstone Highway/US 26 in Idaho Falls.

== History ==
An original construction permit for low-power station K24EV was granted on June 20, 1997, to Idaho Independent Television, Inc. This construction permit was acquired by the Pocatello Media Group on May 19, 2000. K24EV had originally planned to simulcast the programming of future KRXZ-LP on channel 59 licensed to Rexburg, and air UPN programming. KRXZ-LP's license originally covered low-power K63GA on channel 63 which was only on the air for less than a year, from August 1999 to July 2000, when it was granted Remain Silent Authority from the Federal Communications Commission (FCC).

K24EV had its call letters changed to KPID-LP (standing for "Pocatello, Idaho") and applied for a license to cover on February 2, 2001, which was dismissed in May because it was not timely filed. The underlying construction permit had expired in June 2000, more than seven months before Pocatello Media Group filed for the license. Both KPID-LP and KRXZ-LP were put up for auction, but the company winning the FCC auction (ESI Communications) went into bankruptcy and neither signal had gone on the air.

However, Pocatello Media Group's license to cover for KPID-LP was reinstated and granted on June 26, 2001, indicating that the station had finally gotten on the air. At this time, the call letters were changed back to K24EV. KRXZ-LP, however, which was to broadcast UPN to the northern portion of the broadcasting area, never went on the air on channel 59. KRXZ-LP's license was deleted in 2003.

Equity Broadcasting, through its subsidiary EBC Pocatello, Inc., acquired K24EV on February 3, 2003, and changed the call letters to KUNP-LP on March 5, 2004. The station was finally acquired by Fisher Communications, owner of CBS affiliate KIDK, on May 15, 2006. UPN merged with The WB to form The CW and WB affiliate KPIF (channel 15) acquired the CW affiliation. UPN ceased programming on September 15, 2006, and KUNP-LP became an affiliate of the Spanish-language TeleFutura network (now UniMás). The call letters changed again on December 15, 2006, to KPPP-LP.

In mid-December 2008, KPPP dropped its TeleFutura affiliation and signed off. The station then changed its call letters to the current KXPI-LP on April 22, 2009. The station signed back on September 14, 2009, with programming from MyNetworkTV; at that time, KXPI began to be simulcast on a new subchannel of KIDK-DT. Prior to this latest relaunch, the Idaho Falls–Pocatello market was one of the few markets in the country without a MyNetworkTV affiliate of its own. In January 2011, the News-Press & Gazette Company (owner of local ABC affiliate KIFI-TV) began operating KXPI-LD and sister station KIDK through shared services agreements.

On June 15, 2012, it was announced that KXPI-LD/KIDK-DT2 would be taking over the Fox affiliation from Intermountain West Communications Company–managed KFXP (channel 31, now KVUI) beginning July 1. KFXP would then switch to This TV on that date. KXPI would retain MyNetworkTV as a secondary affiliation airing programming in a delayed arrangement at 10 on weeknights.

The affiliation move gives News-Press & Gazette operational control of five of the six largest English-language networks in the Idaho Falls–Pocatello market since The CW moved its affiliation from KPIF to a new digital subchannel of KIFI back in 2009. It also makes the Idaho Falls–Pocatello market one of the few markets with all three legacy networks (ABC, CBS, NBC) as primary affiliations and all three post-1986 networks (Fox, The CW and the MyNetworkTV programming service) as digital multicast channels in a market with four commercial full-power stations (or five when counting KPIF). After joining Fox, KXPI's call sign could also be interpreted as "Fox Pocatello, Idaho".

On April 11, 2013, Fisher announced that it would sell its stations to the Sinclair Broadcast Group. The deal was completed on August 8, 2013. Shortly beforehand, a deal was reached to sell KXPI and KIDK to VistaWest Media, LLC, a company based in St. Joseph, Missouri (where NPG is also based); the stations remain operated by NPG under a shared services agreement. The sale was finalized on November 29. NPG agreed to purchase KXPI-LD outright on February 1, 2017. The sale was completed on March 20.

== Subchannels ==
This station rebroadcasts the subchannels of KIDK.

Subchannels of KIDK and KXPI-LD
Channel	Res.	Aspect	Short name	Programming
3.1	480i	16:9	MeTV	MeTV
3.2	720p	16:9	FoxKXPI	Fox
3.3	480i	4:3	Nosey	Nosey
3.4	480i	4:3	Confess	Confess

== See also ==
- Channel 5 branded TV stations in the United States
- Channel 35 digital TV stations in the United States
- Channel 35 low-power TV stations in the United States
- Channel 3 virtual TV stations in the United States
