= Mink Creek, Idaho =

Unincorporated community in the state of Idaho, United States

- Unincorporated community
- Location within Idaho Location within the United States
- Coordinates: 42°13′42″N 111°42′57″W
- Country: United States
- State: Idaho
- County: Franklin
- Elevation: 5,148 ft (1,569 m)
- Time zone: UTC-7 (Mountain (MST))
  - Summer (DST): UTC-6 (MDT)
- Area codes: 208, 986
- GNIS feature ID: 396904

Mink Creek is an unincorporated community in Franklin County, Idaho, United States. Mink Creek is located along Idaho State Highway 36 12.5 miles (20.1 km) northeast of Preston. The population of Mink Creek was 993 in 2020.

== History ==
Mink Creek's population was 383 in 1909, and was 109 in 1960.
