= KIFI-TV =

Television station in Idaho Falls, Idaho

- Idaho Falls–Pocatello, Idaho; United States
- City: Idaho Falls, Idaho
- Channels: Digital: 18 (UHF); Virtual: 8
- Branding: Local News 8 (8.1); Eyewitness News 3 (8.2)

Programming
- Affiliations: 8.1: ABC; 8.2: CBS; 8.3: The CW; 8.5: Telemundo; for others, see § Subchannels

Ownership
- Owner: News-Press & Gazette Company; (NPG of Idaho, Inc.)
- Sister stations: KIDK, KXPI-LD

History
- First air date: January 23, 1961
- Former channel numbers: Analog: 8 (VHF, 1961–2009); Digital: 9 (VHF, until 2009), 8 (VHF, 2009–2024)
- Former affiliations: NBC (1961–1996); ABC (secondary, 1961–1974)
- Call sign meaning: Idaho Falls, Idaho

Technical information
- Licensing authority: FCC
- Facility ID: 66258
- ERP: 500 kW
- HAAT: 444 m (1,457 ft)
- Transmitter coordinates: 43°30′4″N 112°39′46″W
- Translator(s): see § Translators

Links
- Public license information: Public file; LMS
- Website: www.localnews8.com

KIFI-TV (channel 8) is a television station licensed to Idaho Falls, Idaho, United States, serving the Idaho Falls–Pocatello market as an affiliate of ABC, CBS, The CW Plus, and Telemundo. The station is owned by the News-Press & Gazette Company (NPG) and operated alongside KIDK (channel 3). The two stations share studios on North Yellowstone Highway/US 26 in Idaho Falls; KIFI-TV's transmitter is located on East Butte in unincorporated northern Bingham County along the Idaho National Laboratory border.

KIFI-TV began broadcasting on January 23, 1961, as the second station in Idaho Falls. It was the NBC affiliate for eastern Idaho at start-up, the network having decided to move to the new station from KTLE (channel 6) in Pocatello. KIFI-TV was owned for the first 44 years of its existence by the Brady family, publishers of The Post Register newspaper in Idaho Falls. In 1996, KIFI-TV switched from NBC to ABC. NPG acquired KIFI-TV in 2005; in 2010, operations of KIDK were assumed by KIFI-TV, with the CBS subchannel moving over on January 1, 2021.

== History ==
On February 26, 1953, the Federal Communications Commission (FCC) simultaneously issued construction permits to the owners of radio station KID for channel 3 and KIFI for channel 8. It intended at that time to broadcast its signal from the KIFI radio studio and transmitter site on North Yellowstone Highway. However, KIFI's ownership at the time consisted of multiple people: Frank C. Carman, Grant R. Wrathall, and Edna O. Powers. Each had an interest in five TV outlets, but together they owned seven—more than allowed by FCC regulations introduced in late 1953. In October 1954, the permit for what had been designated as KIFT—along with those of co-owned stations in Boise and Pocatello—was surrendered to the FCC on economic grounds.

In 1955, the J. Robb Brady Trust, owner of The Post Register newspaper, acquired KIFI and co-owned KWIK in Pocatello from the Carman–Wrathall–Powers group, which at the same time sold some of its other stations to newspapers in Utah. Less than two years later, the new KIFI ownership made a move to establish a TV station. On August 9, 1957, the Eastern Idaho Broadcasting and Television Company, the licensee of KIFI, applied for channel 8. Sam Bennion became a competing applicant in February 1959, but an FCC examiner dismissed his bid that December for failure to prosecute and granted the construction permit to KIFI.

KIFI-TV began broadcasting on January 23, 1961. The station was an affiliate of NBC, having signed for network affiliation in November 1960. In making a deal with channel 8, NBC cut off the second television station to start in Eastern Idaho, KTLE (channel 6) in Pocatello. It was claimed that KIFI offered a better, higher-power signal to Eastern Idaho than KTLE. NBC also alleged that Idaho Falls was an easier sell than Pocatello to network sponsors; KTLE executive director L. John Miner noted that Pocatello had not been a city with a station until channel 6 signed on, compared to Idaho Falls, which already had KID-TV (channel 3). KTLE attempted to obtain ABC affiliation in a final effort to keep the station viable, but ABC was already affiliated with KID-TV. KTLE shut down on January 23, 1961, when KIFI-TV came to air. (Note: KTLE had several stints on the air as an independent station, the last coming to an end in 1971, when its owner cleared the way for the construction of KPVI by withdrawing from a license challenge.)

In 1962, KIFI aired the first live remote basketball telecast in Idaho, from Reed Gym at Idaho State University in Pocatello. The station was first locally with color cameras, computerized election returns, and stereo sound. From 1971 to 1977 and again from 1980 to 1981, Lloyd Lindsay Young worked as KIFI-TV's weather presenter. The former DJ, known for his unconventional presentation of local weather, caught his big break when the manager of a San Francisco station watched his forecasts while skiing at Sun Valley.

On September 21, 1995, KIFI announced its plan to switch network affiliation to ABC in January 1996. General manager Rickie Orchin Brady cited ABC's higher network news ratings as the impetus for the switch. By this time, KIFI had the number-one local newscasts in the market.

=== News-Press & Gazette Company ownership and consolidation with KIDK ===
The Brady family sold KIFI-TV to the News-Press & Gazette Company (NPG) in 2005. In announcing the $2.5 million transaction, Orchin Brady noted that the increasing consolidation of the TV station industry had increased the cost of equipment and programming beyond what a standalone station could pay. In 2009, the station acquired The CW affiliation for the Idaho Falls–Pocatello market.

NPG entered into a shared services agreement to operate KIDK, then owned by Fisher Communications, in December 2010. Operations of the two stations were combined, with 27 of 43 KIDK employees being laid off and another 14 joining KIFI. When the agreement took effect in January 2011, KIDK's news offerings were reorganized to reduce overlap with KIFI. In 2013, KIDK was sold to VistaWest Media, a company whose principal had previously worked for NPG; the CBS affiliation and programming moved to a subchannel of KIFI on January 1, 2021.

== Technical information ==
Logo for CW subchannel

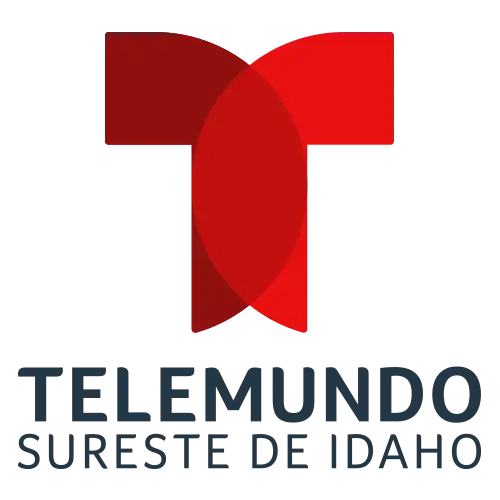
Logo for Telemundo subchannel

=== Subchannels ===
KIFI-TV's transmitter is located on East Butte in unincorporated northern Bingham County along the Idaho National Laboratory border. The station's signal is multiplexed:

Subchannels of KIFI-TV
Subchannel	Res.	Short name	Programming
8.1	720p	KIFI	ABC
8.2	1080i	CBS	CBS
8.3	480i	CW	The CW
8.4	480i	Now	Local 8 News NOW
8.5	480i	Telemun	Telemundo

=== Analog-to-digital conversion ===
KIFI-TV shut down its analog signal, over VHF channel 8, on June 12, 2009, the official digital television transition date. The station's digital signal relocated from its pre-transition VHF channel 9 to channel 8 for post-transition operations.

On July 1, 2024, after receiving FCC approval in November 2023, KIFI-TV changed physical channels to UHF channel 18. KIFI was broadcast from the existing VHF transmitter and the new UHF transmitter until August 14, 2024.

=== Translators ===
KIFI-TV's signal is additionally rebroadcast over the following translators:

- Challis: K22IM-D
- Dingle, etc.: K13QY-D
- Driggs: K27KP-D
- Fish Creek: K34NC-D
- Holbrook: K22NQ-D
- Leadore: K13RV-D, K23JH-D
- Lemhi, etc.: K09SD-D
- Malad City: K33IM-D
- Mink Creek: K10QJ-D
- Montpelier: K20KU-D, K32KC-D
- Pocatello: K21JC-D
- Preston: K16IX-D
- Rexburg, etc.: K22IK-D
- Salmon: K15ME-D
- Soda Springs: K29LG-D
- Jackson, WY: K29HG-D, K36JD-D
- Thayne, etc., WY: K07PB-D

The station was also relayed on K24HU-D in Burley (in the Twin Falls market); this translator was decommissioned on August 14, 2024, as a result of the switch to the UHF band in Idaho Falls and its location in another DMA. KIFI had been available from a Burley translator since 1977.
