= Dingle, Idaho =

Unincorporated community in the state of Idaho, United States

Dingle
- Unincorporated community
- Location within the state of Idaho
- Coordinates: 42°13′10″N 111°16′5″W
- Country: United States
- State: Idaho
- County: Bear Lake
- Time zone: UTC-7 (Mountain (MST))
  - Summer (DST): UTC-6 (MDT)
- ZIP codes: 83233
- GNIS feature ID: 397628

Dingle is an unincorporated community in Bear Lake County, Idaho. It is located in the southeastern part of the state. Despite being unincorporated, it has the zip code 83233.

== History ==
Although a fur trapper and blacksmith named "Peg-Leg Smith" established a trading post on the Oregon Trail from 1848 to 1850 near Dingle, the first permanent settlement at Dingle was made in 1871 by a colony of members of The Church of Jesus Christ of Latter Day Saints (Mormons).

Dingle's population was 40 in 1909, and was estimated at 100 in 1960.

== Notable people ==
- Beulah Ream Allen (1897-1989) physician and WWII POW, who received the Presidential Medal of Freedom.
