= KTVB =

Television station in Boise, Idaho

KTVB and KTFT-LD

KTVB: Boise, Idaho; KTFT-LD: Twin Falls, Idaho; United States
- Channels for KTVB: Digital: 23 (UHF); Virtual: 7
- Channels for KTFT-LD: Digital: 20 (UHF); Virtual: 7
- Branding: NewsChannel 7

Programming
- Affiliations: 7.1: NBC; for others, see § Technical information and subchannels

Ownership
- Owner: Tegna Inc., a subsidiary of Nexstar Media Group; (King Broadcasting Company)

History
- First air date: KTVB: July 12, 1953; KTFT-LD: July 1, 1986
- Former call signs: KTVB: KIDO-TV (1953–1959); KTFT-LD: K38AS (1986–1994); KTFT-LP (1994–2010)
- Former channel number: KTVB: Analog: 7 (VHF, 1953–2009); Digital: 26 (UHF, 2002–2009), 7 (VHF, 2009–2025); KTFT-LD: Analog: 38 (UHF, 1986–2010); Virtual: 7.7 (2010–2022)
- Former affiliations: KTVB: All secondary: DuMont (1953–1955); ABC (1953–1974); PBS (per program, 1970–1971)
- Call sign meaning: KTVB: Television Boise; KTFT-LD: Twin Falls Television

Technical information
- Licensing authority: FCC
- Facility ID: KTVB: 34858; KTFT-LD: 167056
- ERP: KTVB: 1,000 kW; KTFT-LD: 15 kW
- HAAT: KTVB: 805.5 m (2,643 ft); KTFT-LD: 226.6 m (743 ft)
- Transmitter coordinates: KTVB: 43°45′15.6″N 116°5′59.4″W; KTFT-LD: 42°43′47.7″N 114°25′9.1″W
- Translator: see § Translators

Links
- Public license information: KTVB: Public file; LMS; KTFT-LD: Public file; LMS
- Website: www.ktvb.com

KTVB (channel 7) is a television station in Boise, Idaho, United States, affiliated with NBC and owned by the Tegna subsidiary of Nexstar Media Group. The station's studios are located on West Fairview Avenue (off I-184) in Boise, and its transmitter is located on Deer Point in unincorporated Boise County. It is rebroadcast by KTFT-LD (channel 7) in Twin Falls, a low-power semi-satellite that inserts local advertising for the Magic Valley area into KTVB's schedule. KTFT-LD maintains a local sales office on Nielsen Point Place in Twin Falls, while its transmitter is located on Flat Top Butte near Jerome, Idaho. The two stations are branded as the "KTVB Media Group".

Channel 7 is the oldest continuously operating station in Idaho. It debuted on July 12, 1953, as KIDO-TV, the state's second television station to begin operations and the first to be fully licensed. Though KFXD-TV (channel 6) in Nampa beat KIDO-TV to the air by a month, KIDO-TV was by far the more organized operation with network and local programming, neither of which KFXD-TV featured in its brief two-month tenure on air. It was owned by Georgia Davidson alongside Boise radio station KIDO and a primary affiliate of NBC, though it also held affiliations with other networks in its early history. Davidson sold off the radio station in 1958, and channel 7 changed its call sign to KTVB the next year. Davidson was for years the only woman at NBC affiliate meetings. By the 1970s, KTVB had emerged as the news ratings leader in Boise, a position it has not yielded since.

Davidson sold KTVB to King Broadcasting in 1979. The station continued to lead local news ratings in the market with long-tenured personalities. In 1986, KTVB established K38AS (now KTFT-LD), the first low-power NBC affiliate. KTVB has changed ownership in larger transactions four times since 1990: to the Providence Journal Company, Belo Corporation, Gannett (whose broadcast division split off as Tegna in 2015), and Nexstar.

== History ==
=== Construction and early years ===
Boise radio station KIDO, owned by Georgia Davidson, filed with the Federal Communications Commission (FCC) in March 1952 seeking to build a television station on the city's allotted channel 7. The application arrived in anticipation of the end of the FCC's multi-year freeze on TV station applications. The construction permit was granted on December 23, and KIDO already had some equipment on hand; the month before, it conducted a closed-circuit demonstration of television at its AM transmitter site. On an elevation behind the city, construction began in February on the transmitter site. The station picked up affiliations with the CBS, NBC, and DuMont networks; KIDO radio had maintained an NBC affiliation since 1937.

From studios on 700 Crestline Drive, KIDO-TV began broadcasting on July 12, 1953; Philo Farnsworth, a television pioneer, was one of the guests of honor at the dedication. A month earlier, on June 18, KFXD-TV (channel 6) in Nampa put out Idaho's first television test pattern, initiating regular programming under special temporary authority 11 days later. While KIDO-TV was the second television station to sign on in Idaho, it was the first to be fully licensed. It was also effectively the first serious station to begin operations in the state. (Note: KTVB has called itself "Idaho's first television station" since at least 1978 and calls itself such on its website.) While KIDO-TV had studios and network affiliations, KFXD-TV had neither. Channel 6 subsisted on a schedule of old movies and operated with the bare minimum of personnel, lasting less than two months before leaving the air. The lone missing national network, ABC, affiliated with KIDO-TV in December. This replaced CBS, which had moved to new station KBOI-TV (channel 2) the previous month.

National live programming became a reality beginning with the 1955 World Series after a microwave transmission link between Boise and Salt Lake City was set up by KIDO-TV and KBOI-TV. KIDO-TV's tower was relocated to Deer Point in 1956, which together with an increased effective radiated power extended the station's coverage to a further 80,000 people. Davidson agreed to sell KIDO radio to the Mesabi Western Corp. in November 1958; the radio station retained its call sign, and channel 7 became KTVB on February 1, 1959. The sale alleviated cash issues for the television station, which struggled financially in its early years and particularly after Boise became a two-station market; in a 1978 interview, Davidson noted that she "lived with the spectre of bankruptcy, a very embarrassing bankruptcy, day or night".

=== KTVB in La Grande, Oregon: KTVR ===
KTVB received a construction permit on December 18, 1963, to expand its reach with the construction of a satellite station on channel 13 in La Grande, Oregon, northwest of Boise. KTVR began broadcasting on December 6, 1964. It initially offered local news and information for Eastern Oregon from studios in La Grande. In 1967, KTVB closed the local operation in La Grande and converted KTVR into a full-time rebroadcaster of the Boise station.

In 1974, KTVB received an offer from the Oregon Educational and Public Broadcasting Service (OEPBS) to acquire KTVR for integration into its statewide public television network and serve large areas of Eastern Oregon. Citing a lack of local viewership and the availability of NBC stations from Spokane and Portland, KTVB took KTVR out of service on March 7, 1975, while the deal was pending; it did not return to the air under OEPBS ownership until February 1977. It was the second time KTVB had provided facilities to public television; in Boise, KTVB aired Sesame Street when the show debuted in 1969, as Idaho did not have a public station at the time, and it provided its transmitter site and engineering resources to launch KAID-TV (channel 4) in 1971.

=== Growth and new studios ===
Ground was broken for new studios at 5400 Fairview Avenue in 1970, and the facility formally opened the next year. The 20,000 square feet (1,900 m^{2}) facility boasted the largest TV studio in Idaho. In 1974, KTVB lost ABC programming to a new station—KITC-TV, soon renamed KIVI-TV, on channel 6.

Davidson—long the only female owner among 125 men at annual NBC affiliate meetings—announced the sale of KTVB to King Broadcasting of Seattle in 1979. While the sale left Boise without any locally owned television stations, Davidson believed she had to sell KTVB in order to keep the station on the air. She feared saddling her family with a large estate tax burden upon her death, diminishing KTVB's profits and ability to invest. King Broadcasting took over in April 1980. While the new owners retained senior management, they dropped paid religious programming on Sunday mornings to conform with longstanding company policy.

=== Providence Journal, Belo, Gannett/Tegna, and Nexstar ownership ===
King Broadcasting Company put itself up for sale in 1990, citing the age of its majority owners, Patsy Bullitt Collins and Harriet Stimson Bullitt, the daughters of the late company matriarch, Dorothy Bullitt. It accepted an offer from the Providence Journal Company in 1991; the transaction closed in 1992. Under Providence Journal, KTVB became a contributor to the new Northwest Cable News (NWCN) regional cable channel when it launched in 1995, with one reporter dedicated to NWCN based in Boise. (Note: NWCN was later offered over-the-air as a subchannel of KTVB. It shut down on January 6, 2017.) The Belo Corporation purchased Providence Journal in 1996.

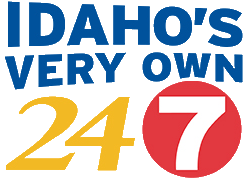
Logo for Idaho's Very Own 24/7

At the end of October 2003, KTVB launched 24/7 NewsChannel on its second digital subchannel and local cable, one of the first digital secondary subchannels in the nation. The subchannel's programming initially consisted of time-shifted newscasts and feature programs, though plans called for original news programs and other local programming. By 2011, the station had rebranded its 24/7 NewsChannel as "Idaho's Very Own 24/7", and it aired a dedicated 6:30 p.m. newscast and 7 a.m. morning news extension. The subchannel more recently has served as an outlet for local sports coverage, including for the 2023-24 season a package of Boise State Broncos men's basketball games and Idaho Steelheads minor league hockey.

On June 13, 2013, the Gannett Company announced that it would acquire Belo. The sale was completed on December 23. Gannett's TV stations and newspapers split into separate companies in 2015, the former being named Tegna.

Nexstar Media Group acquired Tegna in a deal announced in August 2025 and completed in March 2026.

== KTVB in Twin Falls: KTFT-LD ==
Plans to extend channel 7 to Twin Falls had existed almost as long as the station. In 1955, then-KIDO-TV partnered with Twin Falls radio station KTFI to obtain a construction permit for channel 13 in that city, awarded as KHTV. The station grant was reinstated despite protests by KLIX-TV (channel 11, now KMVT) that it would put the local outlet out of business; it was sold and dropped the proposal. In 1974, KTVB considered building a translator in Twin Falls.

Renewed interest in bringing KTVB over-the-air to Twin Falls began in 1981, when King Broadcasting filed for a construction permit for a low-power TV station. This was later abandoned in favor of a channel 38 permit acquired from American Community Broadcasting, Inc., which already had another channel. The station debuted on July 1, 1986, as K38AS, the first low-power station to be an NBC affiliate; KMVT ceased offering NBC programs leading up to its launch. K38AS simulcast all of KTVB's programming but inserted Twin Falls–area commercials, sold from an advertising office in town. In December 1994, the station took a four-letter call sign of KTFT-LP (for "Twin Falls Television").

== News operation ==
News coverage from channel 7 started with its first day on air. Vern Moore, a KIDO announcer, was the first voice heard on the new KIDO-TV and the first TV news anchor in Idaho. However, the station was initially not very competitive against KBOI-TV. When Robert Krueger—Georgia Davidson's son-in-law, who would serve in management for 40 years—started at then-KIDO-TV in 1956, he'd joke that "we ranked fifth in a two-station town".

Under Krueger, the station cemented itself as the news ratings leader in Boise, with such public affairs programming as Viewpoint. As early as 1978, it was the "undisputed ratings king" in the market, well ahead of KBCI and KIVI. KTVB was the first Boise station to present an hour of local early evening news when it debuted the 5 p.m. newscast Idaho at Five in 1984 and first with weekend morning news in 1992. The dominance in news ratings has continued; for instance, in November 2010, each of KTVB's local newscasts had more viewers than their competition combined.

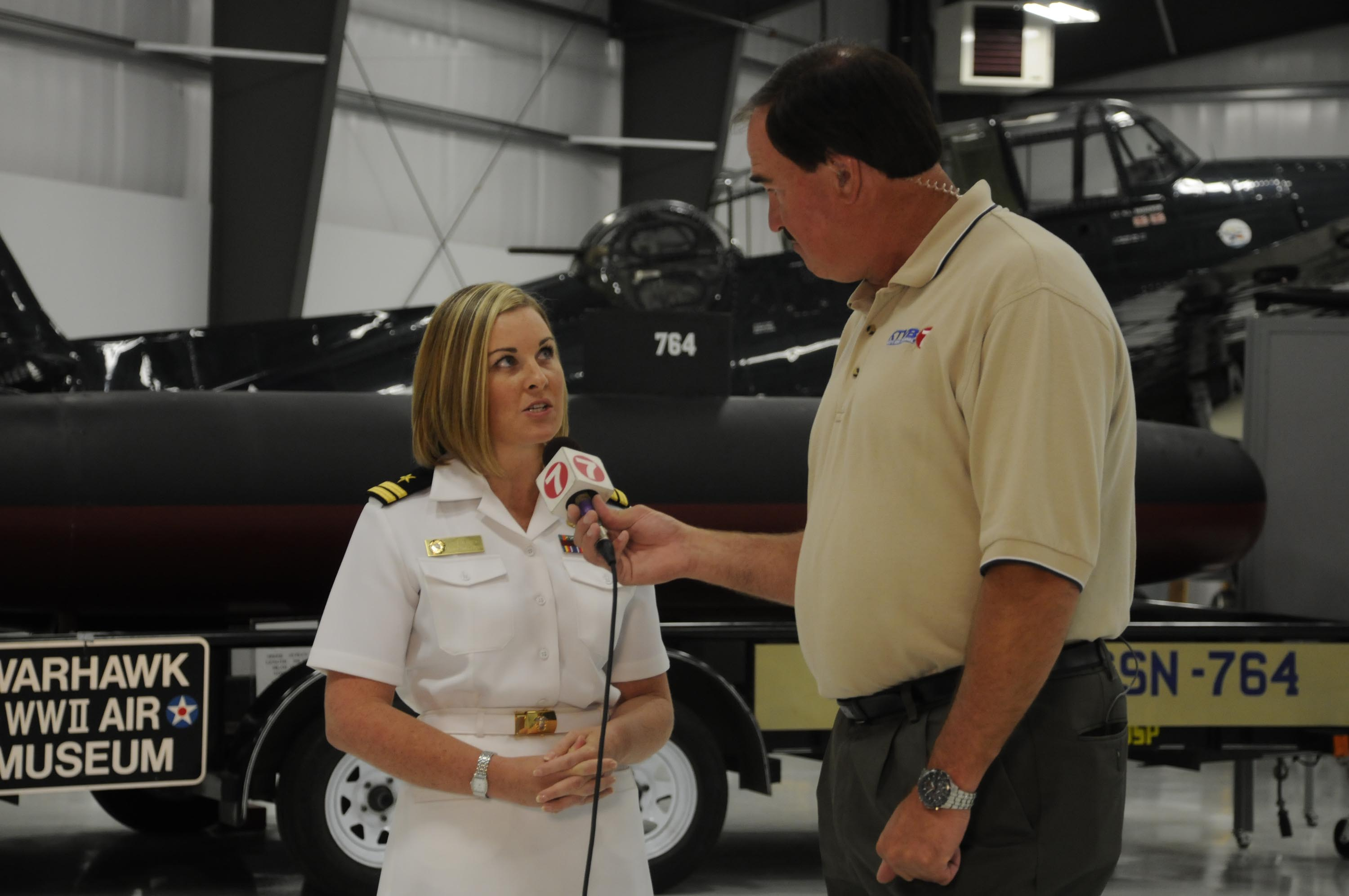
Larry Gebert conducts an interview in 2010

During this time, the station became known for long-tenured and popular local news personalities. Dee Sarton spent nearly 42 years with KTVB, most of that time anchoring Idaho at Five and other early evening newscasts; one of her co-anchors, Carolyn Holly, worked at channel 7 for nearly 34 years. Anchor Mark Johnson spent 30 years with the station, retiring in 2021. Larry Gebert was the station's meteorologist for 30 years until his death in 2022.

KTVB added a 4 p.m. news hour in 2013. In 2020, the station debuted a local lifestyle program, the midday Idaho Today, and reformatted its weeknight 5 p.m. news as the interactive The 208. As of 2024, the station aired 30 hours a week of news and public affairs programming.

=== Notable former-on air staff ===
- Trace Gallagher – reporter and weekend news anchor, 1990–1992
- Michael Jenkins – weekend sports anchor, 1998
- Eric Johnson – weekend sports anchor, 1984–1986
- David Kerley – anchor, early 1980s
- Christi Paul – weekend morning anchor, 1990s
- Wayne Walker – host of outdoors show Incredible Idaho, 1994–1999

== Technical information and subchannels ==
KTVB's transmitter is located on Deer Point in unincorporated Boise County. KTFT-LD's transmitter is located on Flat Top Butte near Jerome. The stations' signals are multiplexed:

Subchannels of KTVB
Subchannel	Res.	Short name	Programming
7.1	1080i	KTVB-HD	NBC
7.2	720p	24/7	Independent
7.3	480i	Quest	Quest
7.4	480i	Crime	True Crime Network
7.5	480i	NEST	The Nest
7.6	480i	OUTLAW	Outlaw
7.7	480i	NOSEY	Nosey
7.8	480i	Antenna	Antenna TV

Subchannels of KTFT-LD
Subchannel	Res.	Short name	Programming
7.1	1080i	KTFT	NBC
7.2	720p	24/7	Independent
7.3	480i		The CW Plus
7.4	480i	Crime	True Crime Network
7.5	480i	DEFY	Defy
7.6	480i	NEST	The Nest
7.7	480i	Quest	Quest
7.8	480i	QVC	QVC

=== Analog-to-digital conversion ===
KTVB began broadcasting a digital signal on UHF channel 26 on November 1, 2002. The station shut down its analog signal, over VHF channel 7, on June 12, 2009, the official date on which full-power television stations in the United States transitioned from analog to digital broadcasts under federal mandate. The station's digital signal relocated from channel 26 to channel 7 for post-transition operations. To solve issues some viewers had receiving the station, KTVB was authorized to increase its effective radiated power weeks after the switch.

=== Translators ===
Translators of KTVB and KTFT-LD
City of license	Callsign	Translating	Channel	ERP	HAAT	Facility ID	Transmitter coordinates	Owner
Cambridge	K17KF-D	KTVB	17	0.51 kW	−54 m (−177 ft)	188131	44°31′58.5″N 116°39′25.5″W	King Broadcasting Company
Cascade	K29NB-D	KTVB	29	0.49 kW	−199 m (−653 ft)	34884	44°31′24.6″N 116°2′57.4″W	King Broadcasting Company
Council	K23KY-D	KTVB	23	0.46 kW	−127 m (−417 ft)	11446	44°39′47.5″N 116°26′27.5″W	King Broadcasting Company
Garden Valley	K34MG-D	KTVB	34	0.0099 kW	7 m (23 ft)	23143	44°1′47.6″N 115°49′38.4″W	Garden Valley Translator District
Glenns Ferry	K16JE-D	KTVB	16	0.43 kW	1 m (3 ft)	188132	42°55′36.6″N 115°21′13.2″W	King Broadcasting Company
Hagerman	K18NF-D	KTFT-LD	18	0.252 kW	55 m (180 ft)	188132	42°50′55.6″N 114°54′47.2″W	Hagerman Translator District
McCall; New Meadows	K15IO-D	KTVB	15	0.47 kW	558 m (1,831 ft)	34869	45°0′6.6″N 116°8′6.4″W	King Broadcasting Company
Terrace Lakes	K10OA-D	KTVB	10	0.047 kW	154 m (505 ft)	23148	44°6′59.6″N 116°0′31.4″W	Garden Valley Translator District
Golconda, NV	K35GD-D	KTVB	35	0.19 kW	443 m (1,453 ft)	28088	41°9′18.6″N 117°20′19.4″W	Humboldt County
McDermitt, NV	K14SE-D	KTVB	14	0.15 kW	88 m (289 ft)	54292	41°37′56.6″N 117°44′30.4″W	Quinn River TV Maintenance District
Winnemucca, NV	K19EU-D	KTVB	19	0.11 kW	693 m (2,274 ft)	28093	41°00′38.5″N 117°46′4.2″W	Humboldt County
Baker City, OR	K18KI-D	KTVB	18	1 kW	575 m (1,886 ft)	127789	44°35′56.5″N 117°47′1.7″W	Blue Mountain Translator District
Baker Valley, OR	K30OF-D	KTVB	30	1 kW	579 m (1,900 ft)	5944	44°35′56.5″N 117°47′1.7″W	Blue Mountain Translator District
La Grande, OR	K21MS-D	KTVB	21	0.4 kW	768 m (2,520 ft)	5953	45°18′34.4″N 117°44′1.7″W	Blue Mountain Translator District
