= KBOI-TV =

Television station in Boise, Idaho

- Boise, Idaho; United States
- Channels: Digital: 20 (UHF); Virtual: 2
- Branding: CBS 2

Programming
- Affiliations: 2.1: CBS; 2.2: CW+; 2.3: Charge!

Ownership
- Owner: Sinclair Broadcast Group; (Sinclair Boise Licensee, LLC)
- Sister stations: KYUU-LD

History
- First air date: November 26, 1953
- Former call signs: KTOO (CP, 1953); KBOI (1953–1955); KBOI-TV (1955–1975); KBCI-TV (1975–2010)
- Former channel numbers: Analog: 2 (VHF, 1953–2009); Digital: 28 (UHF, 2002–2012), 9 (VHF, 2012–2024)
- Former affiliations: Both secondary: ABC (1953–1974); DuMont (1953–1955)
- Call sign meaning: Boise, or the IATA code for the airport

Technical information
- Licensing authority: FCC
- Facility ID: 49760
- ERP: 625 kW
- HAAT: 862 m (2,828 ft)
- Transmitter coordinates: 43°45′20.8″N 116°5′57″W

Links
- Public license information: Public file; LMS
- Website: idahonews.com

KBOI-TV (channel 2) is a television station in Boise, Idaho, United States, affiliated with CBS. It is owned by Sinclair Broadcast Group alongside low-power CW+ affiliate KYUU-LD (channel 35). The two stations share studios on North 16th Street in downtown Boise; KBOI-TV's transmitter is located at the Bogus Basin ski area summit in unincorporated Boise County.

== History ==
KBOI signed on November 26, 1953, as the Treasure Valley's second television station, after NBC affiliate KIDO-TV, channel 7 (now KTVB). It aired an analog signal on VHF channel 2, and was owned by Boise Valley Broadcasters along with KDSH (950 AM). It was originally licensed to Meridian, Idaho, until January 18, 1955; the "-TV" suffix was added to the KBOI call sign on February 11, as the television station's city of license change allowed KDSH radio to change its call sign to KBOI. Channel 2 has always been a primary CBS outlet, but initially shared secondary ABC and DuMont affiliations with KIDO. KBOI lost the latter network after it shut down in 1955 and ABC with the launch of Nampa's KITC, channel 6 (now KIVI-TV) in 1974. The following year, after KBOI radio (now on 670 AM) and KBOI-FM (97.9, now KQFC) were sold off to a separate entity, the television station was renamed KBCI-TV on February 1, 1975, standing for "Boise City, Idaho". At that time, Federal Communications Commission (FCC) regulations required separately-owned TV and radio stations in the same market to have distinct base call signs, hence the change.

Soon after the sale of the radio stations closed, Boise Valley Broadcasters decided to sell KBCI as well. A 1975 deal to sell the station to Donrey Media Group collapsed when the FCC deferred action on the deal due to regulatory issues surrounding the license renewal of Donrey's KORK-TV (later KVBC-TV, now KSNV-DT) in Las Vegas, Nevada. Instead, Boise Valley sold it to Eugene Television, owner of KVAL-TV in Eugene, Oregon, in 1976. The company, later known as Northwest Television, was acquired by Retlaw Enterprises, the company controlled by the family of Walt Disney, in 1996; three years later, Retlaw sold its television station group to Fisher Communications. The acquisition prompted massive layoffs and staff reassignments at KBCI. In 2007, KBCI and other northwest Fisher stations outsourced their master control operations to Seattle's KOMO Plaza (formerly Fisher Plaza), in turn laying off nearly all of the master control operators in Boise. In July 2007, KBCI debuted state-of-the-art Ignite newscast automation, effectively reducing the number of studio crew members from 9 down to 3.

Taking advantage of both a new partnership with KBOI radio (now owned by Cumulus Media) and a 1980s change in FCC regulations that allowed separately-owned stations to share base call signs, Fisher Communications returned the station to its original call letters, KBOI-TV, on February 1, 2010. On April 11, 2013, Fisher announced that it would sell its properties, including KBOI-TV, to the Sinclair Broadcast Group. The deal was completed on August 8, 2013.

== KBOI-DT2 ==
On September 12, 2011, KBOI picked up programming from The CW on its second digital subchannel and on KYUU-LP via The CW Plus. On August 30, 2012, KYUU was upgraded to high definition level. It was still viewed in standard definition 4:3 aspect ratio on KBOI-DT2 until the subchannel was upgraded to 720p high definition in fall 2014.

== News operation ==
KBOI operates a news department with a focus on high impact community advocacy journalism. There is an investigative unit known as the "Truth Squad" normally consisting of two reporters assigned to the beat. In 2004, the station (then KBCI-TV) received the prestigious DuPont and Edward R. Murrow awards for the 2002–2003 investigation into former Boise mayor Brent Coles. The investigation into Cole's mismanagement of public funds led to his resignation and subsequent prosecution by the Idaho Attorney General's Office. In May 2009, the Idaho Press Club recognized KBCI with awards for "Best Investigative Reporting" and "Best Light Feature". Later in the year, it won "Best Newscast" from the Idaho State Broadcaster's Association.

KBOI broadcasts a total of 22 hours of local news each week. KBOI recently added a midday newscast that airs at 11 a.m. KBOI 2 News, First at 4:00 is the market's first-ever newscast at 4 p.m. On weeknights, KBOI airs the CBS Evening News live at 5 p.m. and there is a 30-minute local newscast at 5:30 p.m.

In 2023, KBOI-TV took over presentation for the newscasts of Sinclair-owned KLEW-TV in Lewiston. That same year, Marquee Broadcasting acquired KNIN-TV and contracted KBOI-TV to produce its 7 a.m. and 9 p.m. local newscasts which had been provided by KIVI-TV.

=== Notable former on-air staff ===
- Eric Johnson – sports director (1986–1987)

== Technical information ==
=== Subchannels ===
The station's signal is multiplexed:

Subchannels of KBOI-TV
Channel	Res.	Short name	Programming
2.1	1080i	KBOI	CBS
2.2	720p	KYUU	The CW Plus (KYUU-LD)
2.3	480i	Charge!	Charge!

Simulcast of subchannels of another station

=== Analog-to-digital conversion ===
KBOI-TV shut down its analog signal, over VHF channel 2, on June 12, 2009, the official date on which full-power television stations in the United States transitioned from analog to digital broadcasts under federal mandate. The station's digital signal remained on its pre-transition UHF channel 28, using virtual channel 2. On October 2, 2009, it filed a minor change application to move its digital signal to the more desirable VHF channel 9. The FCC granted a construction permit on April 16, 2010. The allotment was previously used as KNIN-TV's analog channel location. On August 30, 2012, KBOI moved its digital signal to VHF channel 9.

=== Translators ===
- K20NZ-D Garden Valley
- K05EY-D Terrace Lakes
- K28PB-D McDermitt, NV
