= KQTV =

Television station in St. Joseph, Missouri

- St. Joseph, Missouri; United States
- Channels: Digital: 7 (VHF); Virtual: 2
- Branding: KQ2

Programming
- Affiliations: 2.1: ABC; 2.2: Antenna TV; 2.3: Ion

Ownership
- Owner: Heartland Media; (St. Joseph TV License Company, LLC)

History
- First air date: September 27, 1953
- Former call signs: KFEQ-TV (1953–1969)
- Former channel numbers: Analog: 2 (VHF; 1953–2009); Digital: 53 (UHF; 2003–2009)
- Former affiliations: CBS (1953–1967); DuMont (secondary, 1953–1955); ABC (secondary, 1956–1967)
- Call sign meaning: Q from former KFEQ-TV call sign

Technical information
- Licensing authority: FCC
- Facility ID: 20427
- ERP: 40 kW
- HAAT: 179 m (587 ft)
- Transmitter coordinates: 39°46′12″N 94°47′53.4″W

Links
- Public license information: Public file; LMS
- Website: www.kq2.com

KQTV (channel 2) is a television station in St. Joseph, Missouri, United States, affiliated with ABC and owned by Heartland Media. The station's studios are located on Edmond Street in downtown St. Joseph, and its transmitter is located at KQTV's former studio site on Faraon Street in eastern St. Joseph.

KQTV went on the air as KFEQ-TV, the sister station to KFEQ radio, on September 27, 1953. It was the only major network affiliate based in St. Joseph for 59 years and commanded news viewership in the small market, even as it had to compete with Kansas City stations for viewers during non-local programming. The station changed its call sign to KQTV in 1969 when it and KFEQ radio were separated and has had a succession of owners, with Heartland acquiring KQTV in 2017 from Nexstar Broadcasting Group. In 2025, after a previous purchase attempt was not completed, KQTV entered into a shared services agreement to pool news coverage with the News-Press & Gazette Company, owner of the other TV newsroom in St. Joseph.

== History ==
=== KFEQ-TV: Early years ===
St. Joseph radio station KFEQ applied to the Federal Communications Commission (FCC) on April 17, 1948, for permission to construct a new television station on channel 13. This application was still pending when the FCC, in October 1948, imposed a freeze on new TV station construction permits. In the shuffling of channel allocations during the freeze, St. Joseph lost channel 13 but picked up channel 2 from Kansas City. The FCC lifted the freeze beginning in April 1952, and KFEQ amended its application to specify the new channel. KFEQ-TV received its construction permit on October 15, 1952. By the start of 1953, construction was underway on the station's studios on a plot at 40th and Faraon streets in St. Joseph, which would also house a 750-foot (229 m) transmission tower. Delays in fabricating structural steel components for the tower caused the launch to be postponed; the tower sections did not make it to St. Joseph until the start of July, and work moved slower than anticipated, causing an August 15 projected start date to be missed.

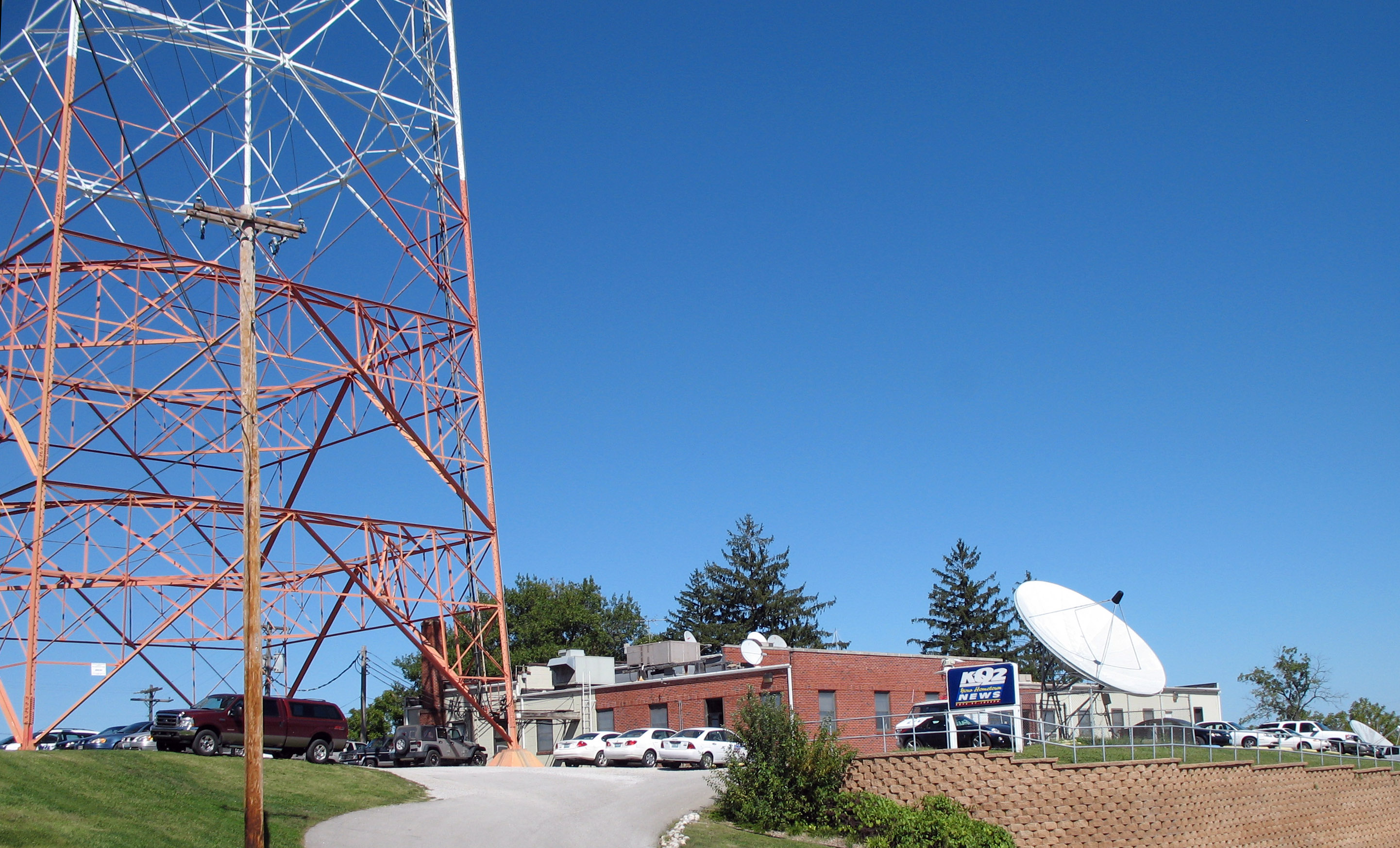
KQTV's former studios on Faraon Street in St. Joseph. The station operated from the site for much of its history; its transmitter is still at the site.

KFEQ-TV began broadcasting on September 27, 1953. It was an affiliate of CBS and the DuMont Television Network. For viewers in the St. Joseph–Kansas City region, it was the second station to sign on that day, alongside KCMO-TV (now KCTV) on channel 5 from Kansas City. The DuMont network ceased distributing programming in 1955.

Barton Pitts, founder of KFEQ-TV and owner of the morning St. Joseph Gazette and afternoon St. Joseph News-Press newspapers, opted to exit broadcasting for health reasons in 1955. He sold the KFEQ stations to the Midland Broadcasting Company, whose owners included actor Bing Crosby and John Fetzer, for $700,000. During its ownership, the channel 2 studios were expanded in size. Midland owned the stations for less than two years before selling to the Fine family, a theater operator and former owner of WFIE in Evansville, Indiana, in 1957; the transaction was motivated by Midland's investors' recent acquisition of KCOP-TV in Los Angeles.

In its early years, KFEQ-TV presented a range of local non-news programs. In 1957, channel 2 debuted a local teen dance show, Let's Dance, hosted by KFEQ radio DJ Allen Shaw and in later years by Bill Foster. Women's talk show host Marge Miner received a national award from McCall's magazine in 1959 for her series of programs on cerebral palsy. The station also aired Saturday night wrestling telecasts from its studio, put on by local wrestling promoter Gust Karras; this continued into the mid-1970s.

After a 1960 attempt to sell the KFEQ stations and KLIK in Jefferson City to Connie B. Gay fell through, the Fines sold the properties to Mid-States Broadcasting, headed by John P. McGoff, in 1963. In 1967, KFEQ-TV switched affiliations from CBS to ABC, with KCMO-TV serving as the nearest CBS affiliate to St. Joseph.

=== KQTV: Changing ownership, Topeka expansion attempt ===
McGoff sold the KFEQ stations to separate owners over the course of 1968. Channel 2 went to ISC Industries for $3.1 million. ISC—a diversified firm based in Kansas City with interests ranging from truck manufacturing to pen production and securities—pledged to upgrade the station to allow it to broadcast local color programming. The sale required one or the other of KFEQ radio and television to change call signs; the radio station kept KFEQ and channel 2 became KQTV on February 1, 1969. As KFEQ-TV had been informally known as "The Q", the new call sign retained brand equity from the old. After ISC closed on the purchase in July 1969, the company expanded into radio by buying two radio stations in the Kansas City area.

After three years, ISC opted to exit broadcasting entirely and sold KQTV, plus FM radio stations KGRV in St. Louis and KLYX in Houston, to Amaturo Group in a sale completed in 1973.

In January 1976, Amaturo Group applied to build channel 43 in Topeka, Kansas, as a semi-satellite of KQTV. At the time, Topeka only had two commercial stations and no full-time ABC affiliate, a void that KQTV hoped to fill by combining its existing schedule with separate news programs for the Topeka area. The application was opposed by Topeka's NBC affiliate, KTSB, which believed that because Topeka had two full-line television stations, a satellite was not permissible and constituted unfair competition. The FCC concurred in May 1978 and dismissed the channel 43 application, finding there was too much signal overlap between the proposed Topeka station and KQTV, even with the proposed local program content for the new Topeka service. KQTV instead fell back on another application it had filed to construct a taller tower, which would bring Topeka and Kansas City into its primary coverage area but was protested by the Kansas City stations.

Amaturo Group sold KQTV in 1979 to Elba Development Corporation of Rochester, New York, owned by the Glazer family, so it could pursue larger station transactions without being at the limit of VHF television stations ownable by one group once it bought four other stations, revealed to be the Nebraska Television Network in central and western Nebraska. Elba refiled the tower application, which proposed a new, 2,000-foot (610 m) mast at Potter, Kansas. The relocation plan was denied by the FCC in 1983 because, in spite of adding 465,000 people to KQTV's coverage area, the move would have stripped slightly over 10,000 people of the only TV service they reliably received. In 1986, KQTV tried again to build a tall tower in Kansas. The FCC denied this attempt because it would have left 4,940 people in a 10-county area without television service, rejecting KQTV's contention that many viewers in the area had cable and could receive stations.

In 1990, Elba sold KQTV, along with WRBL in Columbus, Georgia, and WTWO in Terre Haute, Indiana, to TCS Television Partners for $56 million. In 1994, KQTV became a secondary affiliate of the NFL on Fox to serve non-cable viewers who did not receive a Fox network signal; this deal was honored even though Fox moved its programming in Kansas City to WDAF-TV months later. The managing general partner of TCS Television Partners, Martin Pompadur, decided to put the stations on the market in 1994; while the station was not sold then, TCS tried again in 1996.

KQTV logo, used from 2000 to 2009

Nexstar Broadcasting Group acquired KQTV and WTWO in 1997. At the time, Nexstar's only television property was WYOU in Scranton, Pennsylvania, but the firm had been founded by Perry Sook to acquire other mid-market TV stations. On June 12, 2009, KQTV switched from an analog to a digital signal; a low power on VHF channel 7 led to signal strength issues in rural areas on the fringes of the station coverage area.

From its sign-on until 1986, with the advent of religious station KTAJ-TV, channel 2 had been the only station in St. Joseph. KTAJ posed minimal competition to KQTV, which by 2012 commanded 87 percent of television revenue in a market that had no other major network affiliates. This began to change in 2012 when the News-Press & Gazette Company (NPG), which owned television stations elsewhere in the western United States and the News-Press 3 Now local cable channel in St. Joseph, launched a local Fox affiliate, KNPN-LD, and a local news department leaning on the resources of the News-Press. In following years, NPG launched a local NBC affiliate—KNPG-LD—and CBS affiliate—KCJO-LD.

=== Heartland Media ownership and NPG sale attempt ===
In 2016, Nexstar merged with Media General and had to divest several stations to comply with FCC ownership cap limits. It sold a package of KQTV and four other stations to Heartland Media, through its USA Television MidAmerica Holdings joint venture with MSouth Equity Partners, for $115 million in a purchase that closed in January 2017.

Heartland Media announced its intention to sell KQTV to the News-Press & Gazette Company on April 4, 2019. While the sale was technically permissible—NPG did not own a full-power television station in St. Joseph, broadcast-newspaper cross-ownership limits had just been repealed, and broadcast ownership limits did not take low-power stations into account—it did create potential antitrust issues because the purchase would give NPG control of the city's daily newspaper and all four major network affiliations (plus The CW and Telemundo). The deal never received final approval from federal authorities, and the sale agreement expired on September 30; NPG then suspended efforts to buy KQTV. KQTV was not included in the subsequent sale of most of Heartland Media's other stations to Allen Media. In November 2025, NPG and KQTV announced that the News-Press Now newsroom of NPG's St. Joseph TV stations would merge with KQTV's under a shared services agreement under the latter's name and brand, with a larger reporting staff. The combined newsroom was to be initially based at KQTV's studios before moving to NPG's Edmond Street headquarters.

== News operation ==
KQTV historically commanded news viewership in the St. Joseph area, even as it effectively competed with the Kansas City stations for viewership during entertainment and network programming and in spite of its lesser production values than the major-market Kansas City stations widely available over-the-air and on cable, with frequent turnover of on-air personalities. As of 2024, KQTV broadcast 18 1/2 hours of locally produced newscasts each week (with 3 1/2 hours each weekday and a half-hour each on Saturdays and Sundays), as well as a high school football program during the season.

=== Notable former staff ===
- Kim Khazei — anchor/reporter
- Fred McLeod – sportscaster, 1974
- Miles O'Brien – anchor/reporter, 1983
- Roseanne Tellez — anchor/reporter

== Technical information ==
=== Subchannels ===
KQTV's transmitter is co-sited with its former studio building on Faraon Street in eastern St. Joseph. The station's signal is multiplexed:

Subchannels of KQTV
Subchannel	Res.	Short name	Programming
2.1	720p	KQTV-HD	ABC
2.2	480i	Antenna	Antenna TV (4:3)
2.3	480i	ION	Ion
