= Roseanne Tellez =

American television reporter and anchor (born 1962)

- Born: October 13, 1962 (age 64); Washington, DC, United States
- Education: Orange Coast College; University Of Southern California
- Occupation: News Anchor at WFLD-TV (Chicago)
- Years active: 1988-present

Roseanne Tellez (born October 13, 1962) is an American television reporter and anchor who has been working since 1988. From December 2004 to February 2019, she anchored morning, midday, and evening newscasts for WBBM-TV, the CBS affiliate in Chicago, Illinois. Most recently, she was a general assignment reporter and fill-in anchor.

== Early life and career ==
A native of the Washington, DC suburbs in northern Virginia, Tellez earned an A.A. degree from Orange Coast College in 1983, and a B.A. degree in broadcast journalism from the University of Southern California in Los Angeles. From 1988 to 1990, she worked for WTLV-TV in Jacksonville, Florida before moving to WGN-TV in Chicago, working for the morning and midday team. Prior to her work in Jacksonville, Tellez worked for KQTV in St. Joseph, Missouri as an anchor and reporter.

On February 18, 2019, Chicago media critic Robert Feder reported that Tellez had resigned from WBBM-TV. Friday, February 15 was her last day at the station.

On February 21, 2019, it was announced that Tellez has joined WFLD-TV as the early morning weekday news anchor, with her first day there as Monday, March 4, 2019.

Tellez was exited from WFLD-TV in March 2026 as part of a broader restructuring and restaffing plan.

== Personal life ==
Tellez is divorced with three children. In her spare time, she works in the fight against muscular dystrophy, even hosting the local Muscular Dystrophy Association's annual telethon.
