= KTAJ-TV =

Television station in St. Joseph, Missouri

- St. Joseph–Kansas City, Missouri; United States
- City: St. Joseph, Missouri
- Channels: Digital: 21 (UHF); Virtual: 16

Programming
- Affiliations: 16.1: TBN; for others, see § Subchannels

Ownership
- Owner: Trinity Broadcasting Network; (Trinity Broadcasting of Texas, Inc.)

History
- First air date: October 15, 1986 (Note: The Broadcasting and Cable Yearbook says October 6, while the Television and Cable Factbook says October 7.)
- Former call signs: KTAJ (1986–2003)
- Former channel numbers: Analog: 16 (UHF, 1986–2009)
- Call sign meaning: "Keep Teaching About Jesus"

Technical information
- Licensing authority: FCC
- Facility ID: 999
- ERP: 1,000 kW
- HAAT: 315.8 m (1,036 ft)
- Transmitter coordinates: 39°1′19.9″N 94°30′49.7″W

Links
- Public license information: Public file; LMS
- Website: www.tbn.org

KTAJ-TV (channel 16) is a religious television station licensed to St. Joseph, Missouri, United States, serving the St. Joseph and Kansas City markets. The station is owned by the Trinity Broadcasting Network (TBN). KTAJ-TV's transmitter is located at the intersection of East 23rd Street and Topping Avenue in Kansas City's Blue Valley section.

KTAJ-TV formerly operated from studios on Northwest Seymour Avenue in the Tiffany Springs area of Kansas City. That facility was one of several closed by TBN in 2019 following the Federal Communications Commission (FCC)'s repeal of the "Main Studio Rule", which required full-service television stations like KTAJ-TV to maintain facilities in or near their communities of license.

Although KTAJ-TV mainly serves the Kansas City area, because St. Joseph is a separate media market, it is officially assigned by Nielsen to that community and market. The station has been available on cable television providers in both the St. Joseph and Kansas City markets since its sign-on, though national providers usually choose to carry the national TBN feed instead outside cases where KTAJ's main channel is required to be carried under must-carry provisions.

== Overview ==
The station first signed on the air on October 15, 1986, and was built and signed on by All American Television (unrelated to the syndicator of the same name), as an affiliate of the Trinity Broadcasting Network. In 2000, KTAJ was purchased by TBN, along with the other All American Television stations. KTAJ is the only full-power TBN station in the state of Missouri, and was one of only two stations licensed to St. Joseph—alongside ABC affiliate KQTV (channel 2)—until the June 2012 sign-on of Fox affiliate KNPN-LD (channel 26)—although KQTV remains the only local full-power commercial television station licensed to the city (two other low-power stations owned by KNPN parent News-Press & Gazette Company have signed on since that point—KBJO-LD (now KNPG-LD; channel 21) and KNPG-LD (now KCJO-LD; channel 30)).

== Local programming ==
Until the Main Studio repeal, KTAJ produced and aired local versions of TBN's flagship program Praise the Lord and Joy in Our Town, a public affairs program.

== Subchannels ==
The station's signal is multiplexed:

Subchannels of KTAJ-TV
| Subchannel | Res. | Short name | Programming |
|---|---|---|---|
| 16.1 | 720p | TBN HD | TBN |
| 16.2 | 720p | TVDEALS | Infomercials |
| 16.3 | 480i | Inspire | TBN Inspire |
| 16.4 | 480i | ONTV4U | OnTV4U (infomercials) (4:3) |
| 16.5 | 480i | POSITIV | Positiv |

TBN-owned full-power stations permanently ceased analog transmissions on April 16, 2009.
