= News-Press NOW =

- Country: United States
- Broadcast area: Buchanan, DeKalb and Andrew County, Missouri
- Headquarters: St. Joseph, Missouri

Programming
- Picture format: 480i (SDTV); 1080i (HDTV)

Ownership
- Owner: News-Press & Gazette Company
- Sister channels: KNPN-LD, KNPG-LD, KCJO-LD

History
- Launched: January 6, 2006; 19 years ago
- Former names: St. Joe NOW (2006-2010); News-Press 3 NOW (2010-2012)

Links
- Website: newspressnow.com

Availability

Terrestrial
- KNPN-LD (St. Joseph): Channel 26.3 (SD)

News-Press NOW is a 24-hour local cable news and weather channel based in St. Joseph, Missouri and serves Buchanan, DeKalb, and Andrew counties. Owned by News-Press & Gazette Company, the channel is based out of the company's corporate headquarters on Edmond Street in downtown Saint Joseph.

News-Press NOW is one of a handful of flagship properties owned by News-Press & Gazette Company, which also publishes the St. Joseph News-Press and owns local Fox affiliate KNPN-LD, NBC affiliate KNPG-LD, and CBS affiliate KCJO-LD, all four of which also share offices with the channel at News-Press & Gazette's Edmond Street headquarters. It is carried on Suddenlink cable channel 3 and in high definition on digital channel 103 throughout the St. Joseph metropolitan area (including the communities of Maryville, Savannah, Country Club, and Agency). Since June 2, 2012, it is also rebroadcast as a digital subchannel of KNPN-LD, broadcasting over-the-air on UHF channel 26.3 in 16:9 standard definition widescreen.

== History ==
Originally launched as St. Joe NOW in January 2006, News-Press 3 NOW was sold by News-Press & Gazette Company in April 2011, as part of the sale of NPG Cable, Inc., the company's cable television division that operated cable systems in Missouri, Arizona and California, to Suddenlink Communications for $350 million.

With the repurchase of the channel and the launch of KNPN-LD, News-Press 3 NOW became News-Press NOW. The channel's format changed from a cable-only service that offered a mix of live newscasts and news rebroadcasts exclusive to the channel to one that simulcasts and re-airs KNPN-LD's, KNPG-LD's and KCJO-LD's weekday morning, noon and nightly newscasts, along with a simulcast of the Storm Tracker weather radar during overnight and weekend daytime hours. News-Press Now is now KQTV.

== See also ==
Channel 3 branded TV stations in the United States
