= KNPN-CD =

Television station in St. Joseph, Missouri

- St. Joseph, Missouri; United States
- Channels: Digital: 15 (UHF); Virtual: 26
- Branding: Fox 26 KNPN; News-Press Now on Fox 26 KNPN; CBS 30 KCJO (26.2); News-Press NOW (26.3)

Programming
- Affiliations: 26.1: Fox; for others, see § Subchannels

Ownership
- Owner: News-Press & Gazette Company; (News-Press TV, LLC)
- Sister stations: KCJO-CD, KNPG-CD, News-Press NOW

History
- Founded: January 30, 2012
- First air date: June 2, 2012
- Former call signs: K26LV-D (2012); KNPN-LD (2012–2024)
- Former channel numbers: Digital: 26 (UHF, 2012–2018)
- Former affiliations: 26.3: CW+ (via KNPG-LD, 2012−2013)
- Call sign meaning: News-Press Now

Technical information
- Licensing authority: FCC
- Facility ID: 188056
- Class: CD
- ERP: 15 kW
- HAAT: 69.6 m (228 ft)
- Transmitter coordinates: 39°45′2.8″N 94°50′25.8″W

Links
- Public license information: Public file; LMS
- Website: www.newspressnow.com/tv

KNPN-CD (channel 26) is a low-power, Class A television station in St. Joseph, Missouri, United States, affiliated with the Fox network. It is the flagship television property of the locally based News-Press & Gazette Company (NPG), and is sister to NBC/CW+/Telemundo affiliate KNPG-CD (channel 21), CBS affiliate KCJO-CD (channel 30) and local news and weather channel News-Press NOW; this arrangement also places the four outlets under the same ownership as the St. Joseph News-Press newspaper.

All five media properties are based out of NPG's corporate offices on Edmond Street in downtown St. Joseph; KNPN-CD's transmitter is located on South 16th Street (adjacent to US 36) just southeast of downtown. There is no separate website for the three stations, instead they are integrated with that of the co-owned St. Joseph News-Press.

== History ==
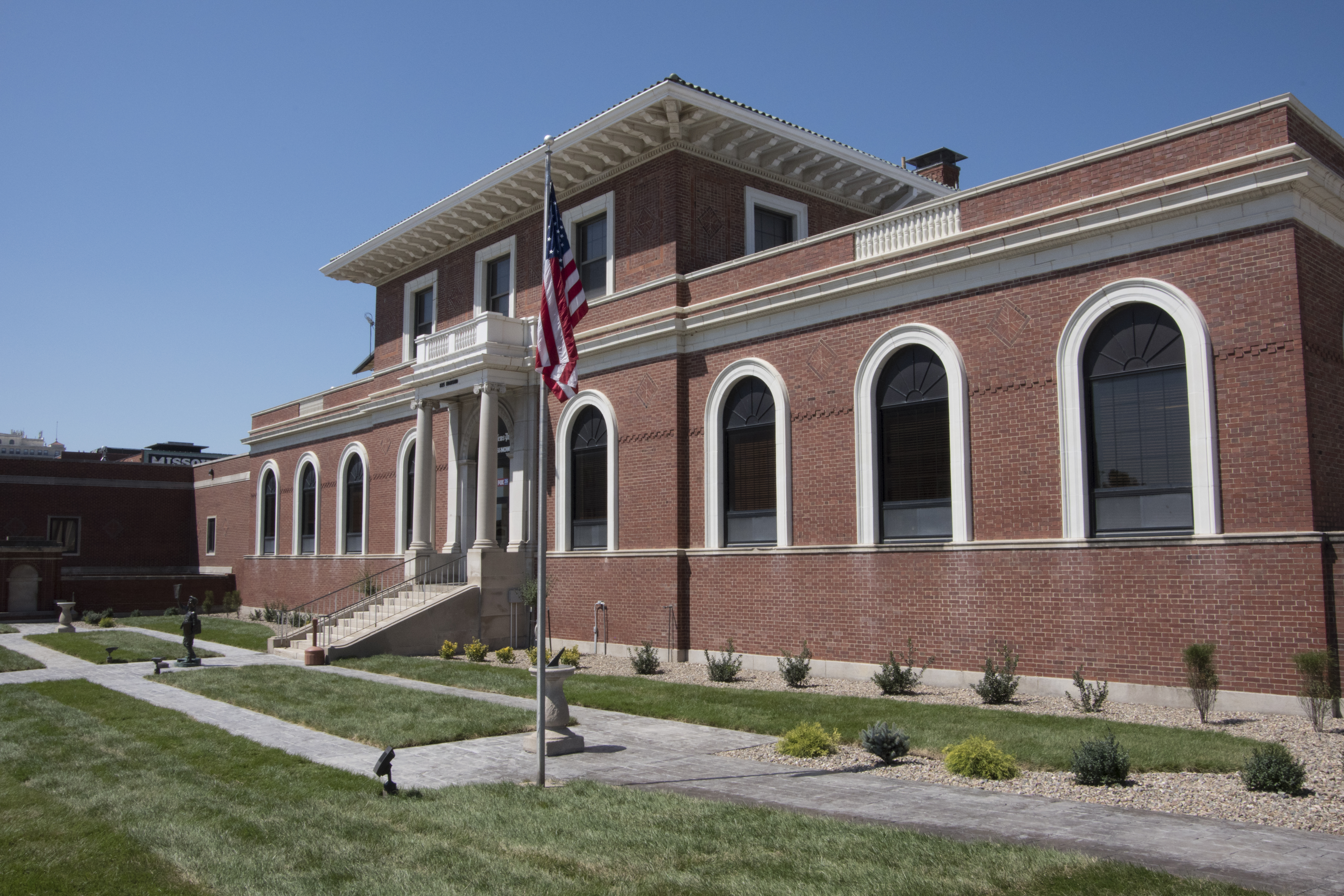
KNPN studios at News-Press headquarters in St. Joseph.

On March 14, 2012, News-Press & Gazette acquired two low-power digital television licenses in Saint Joseph, K16KF-D and K26LV-D from Sunrise, Florida–based DTV America 1, LLC for $72,000; two weeks earlier on February 29, the Federal Communications Commission (FCC) granted the company's construction permit application to relocate the two stations' transmitter facilities from a tower near Mound City to the St. Joseph transmitter and upgrade the effective radiated power for both stations (the channel 16 license would not be activated until March 7, 2013, when it signed on as CW affiliate KBJO-LD). K26LV-D was assigned the call letters KNPN-LD on April 5, 2012, before reverting to the original K26LV-D callsign on May 8, 2012; the callsign reversion was deleted from FCC authorization records two weeks later on May 23, 2012, reverting to the KNPN-LD callsign.

The station officially signed on the air at 6 a.m. on June 2, 2012, becoming the first broadcast television station to have been built and signed on by News-Press & Gazette Company and the third station in St. Joseph, after ABC affiliate KQTV (channel 2) – which signed on in September 1953 as primary CBS affiliate KFEQ-TV, and TBN owned-and-operated station KTAJ-TV (channel 16)—which launched in October 1986 and also serves the adjacent Kansas City market. KNPN-LD displaced Kansas City's WDAF-TV (channel 4)—which is among the seven full-power Kansas City stations that provide city-grade signal coverage in St. Joseph proper—as the area's default Fox station on Suddenlink Communications, DirecTV and Dish Network; however some providers continued to supply CW programming through out-of-market stations (Kansas City affiliate KCWE on some rural cable systems and Omaha affiliate KXVO—which provides rimshot signal coverage in the far northwestern tip of Missouri—on DirecTV; and WPIX/New York City, KTLA/Los Angeles and KWGN-TV/Denver on Dish Network through its superstation package) instead of KNPN's CW-affiliated third digital subchannel (News-Press & Gazette assumed promotional and advertising control of cable-only CW Plus station "WBJO" from Suddenlink with the sign-on of the subchannel); KNPN's Telemundo-affiliated fourth subchannel, meanwhile, only replaced the network's national feed on local cable providers, as Telemundo did not have an existing affiliate in Missouri.

KNPN's launch marked News-Press & Gazette's return to a television presence in Saint Joseph as the company had formerly owned NPG Cable (which included St. Joseph as one of its service areas) until it sold its cable television holdings, including ownership of News-Press 3 NOW (which News-Press & Gazette would re-acquire in May 2012), to Suddenlink for $350 million in November 2010; News-Press & Gazette's ownership of KNPN and the St. Joseph News-Press does not violate FCC regulations preventing cross-ownership of a television station and a newspaper in the same market as FCC rules allow such joint ownership of a station if it is licensed as a low-power outlet.

On October 9, 2013, KNPN was pulled from DirecTV due to a retransmission consent dispute involving News-Press & Gazette Company (that resulted in the removal of the company's 12 other stations throughout the country) and the satellite provider over carriage fees. KNPN and the other NPG stations were restored through an interim agreement reached on October 25, 2013.

On August 17, 2016, the News-Press and Gazette Company announced it has signed an affiliation deal for sister station KNPG-LD with NBC, giving the St. Joseph market its first locally based NBC affiliate. The KNPG-LD call letters were moved from its Telemundo affiliate on channel 30 to the stronger channel 21 signal, while channel 21's existing CW network affiliation was moved to subchannel 21.2 and the KBJO-LD callsign on channel 21 was relocated to channel 30, which continued as a Telemundo affiliate.

=== KNPN-CD2 ===
On February 24, 2017, News-Press and Gazette Company announced that KBJO-LD (channel 30)—which had been simulcast on KNPN's LD4 subchannel—would switch its primary affiliation to CBS on June 1, a move that would not only return the network to St. Joseph for the first time since KQTV (as KFEQ-TV) left CBS to become a full-time ABC affiliate in 1967, but also would give the St. Joseph area in-market affiliates of five of the six major American commercial broadcast networks (counting KNPG-LD's CW-affiliated subchannel). On the date of the switch, when KBJO also changed its call letters to KCJO-LD to reflect its CBS affiliation, KNPN moved the KCJO-LD simulcast to its LD2 subchannel; this consequently resulted in a realignment of KNPN's digital multiplex, with News-Press NOW moving to a reactivated LD3 subchannel, while Telemundo programming was effectively dropped from KNPN as a result of KCJO's decision to disaffiliate from the Spanish-language network in order to assume the CBS affiliation (Telemundo programming moved to a new LD3 subchannel on KNPG-LD).

=== News operation ===
KNPN-CD presently broadcasts 22 hours of locally produced newscasts each week (with four hours each weekday and one hour each on Saturdays and Sundays), which are produced in-house at the station's Edmond Street studios. The station's news department utilizes reporting and coverage resources from the St. Joseph News-Press, and also shares content with the News-Press NOW news channel.

The station's Doppler weather radar is presented on-air as "Storm Tracker", operating at the main studios in Saint Joseph and utilizing live VIPIR data from several radars operated by regional National Weather Service forecast offices. Its radar system existed prior to the launch of KNPN-LD as the radar system used during forecasts and severe weather coverage on News-Press 3 NOW. The station does not have a sports department.

Local newscasts debuted on KNPN the day the station began operations on June 2, 2012, with the launch of a 5:30 p.m. newscast and have been broadcast in high definition from their debut; this was later followed by the debut of a half-hour prime time newscast at 9 p.m. Two days later on June 4, the station debuted a weekday morning newscast (running for 2 1/2 hours from 5:30 to 8 a.m.) and a half-hour midday newscast at noon. Upon the debut of the newscasts, KNPN became the second Fox affiliate in NPG's portfolio to have its newscasts produced in-house (the other being KECY-TV in Yuma, Arizona–El Centro, California, which began producing local newscasts on its main Fox and secondary ABC subchannels, and Telemundo affiliate KESE-LP on March 23, 2012). Local newscasts on the company's three other Fox outlets (KQFX-LD in Columbia, KDFX-CD in Palm Springs and KFXO-CD in Bend, Oregon) are produced by a co-owned Big Three network affiliate in the respective market.

KNPN-CD is the smallest Fox affiliate by market size (as Nielsen Media Research ranks St. Joseph 201st out of 210 U.S. television markets) to produce its local newscasts in-house; previously, the smallest media market with a Fox affiliate that produced its own local news programming in any form was San Angelo, Texas (ranked 197th), where KIDY at the time of KNPN's sign-on aired hourly local news updates during daytime programming and simulcasts of KABB in San Antonio's morning and 9 p.m. newscasts (the station has since launched its own full-fledged newscasts). KNPN moved its early evening newscast from 5:30 to 5 p.m. in January 2014.

Coinciding with the deal announced in August to affiliate KNPG-LD with NBC, NPG announced it would produce exclusive newscasts for KNPG-LD, as well as simulcast others from KNPN. KNPG-CD simulcasts the first 1 1/2 hours of KNPN's morning newscast and its 5 p.m. newscast, and also produces exclusive 6 p.m. and 10 p.m. newscasts. As of June 1, the same newscasts also simulcast on sister station and CBS affiliate KCJO-LD.

== Subchannels ==
The station's signal is multiplexed:

Subchannels of KNPN-CD
Subchannel	Res.	Short name	Programming
26.1	720p	KNPN	Fox
26.2	1080i	NNPN	CBS (KCJO-CD)
26.3	480i	ONPN	News-Press NOW
26.4	480i	QNPN	Ion Mystery
26.5	480i	SNPN	Laff (4:3)

Simulcast of subchannels of another station

== See also ==
- Channel 15 digital TV stations in the United States
- Channel 15 low-power TV stations in the United States
- Channel 26 virtual TV stations in the United States
