= Henry D. Bradley =

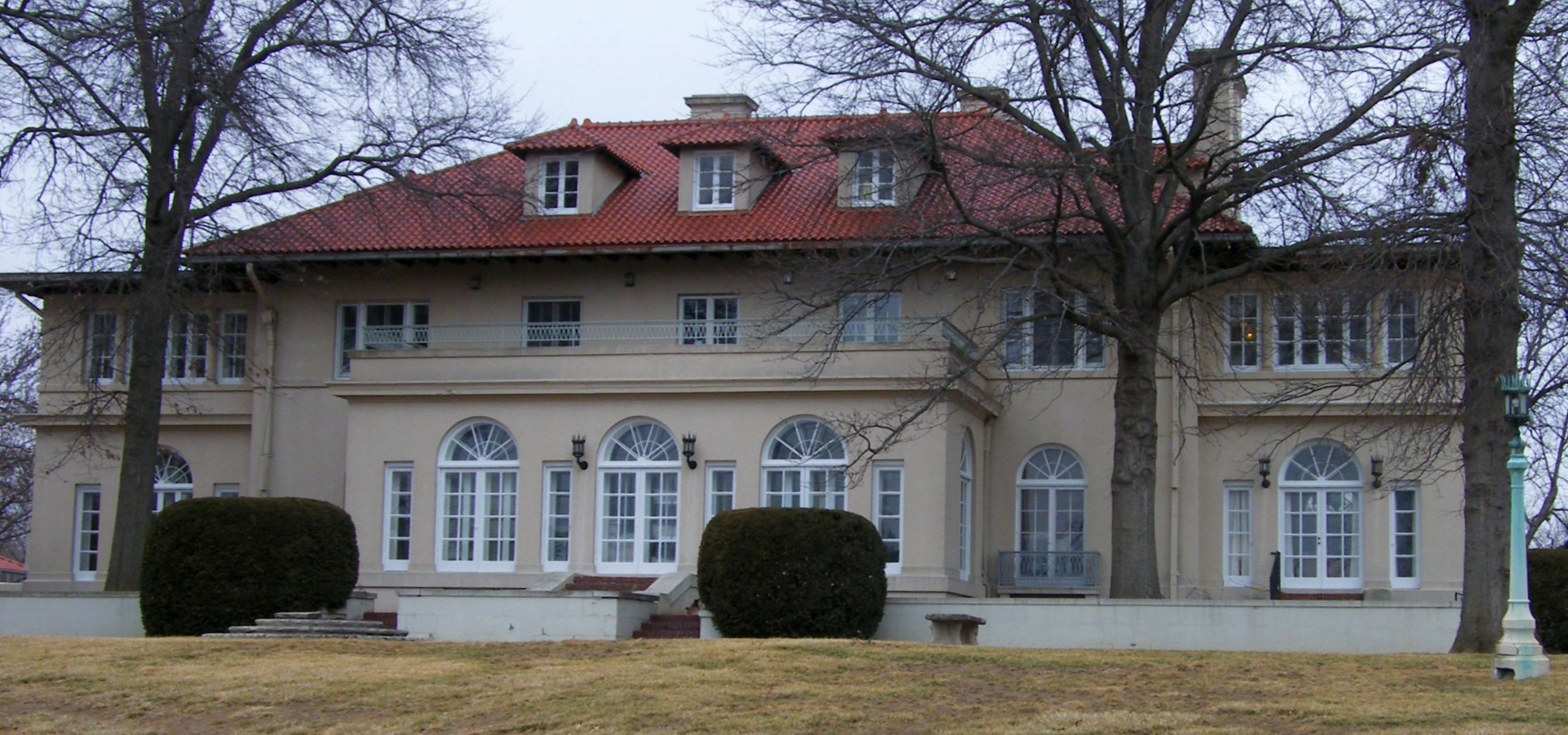
The Huston Wyeth mansion is a St. Joseph landmark that is now part of an office park

Henry D. Bradley (1893 – December 14, 1973) was a publisher of the St. Joseph News-Press who was the first member of the Bradley family which controls the News-Press & Gazette Company media company.

Bradley worked at the Toledo Blade from 1906 to 1923. He worked for Max Aitken, 1st Baron Beaverbrook at the Daily Express. He was Norristown Times Herald in Norristown, Pennsylvania from 1924 to 1926. He was president and general manager of the Bridgeport Times-Star from 1927 to 1939 in Bridgeport, Connecticut.

Charles M. Palmer brought him to the News-Press to be publisher in 1939. He acquired the paper in 1951 from the estate of Palmer.
