= Channel 9 low-power TV stations in the United States =

The following low-power television stations broadcast on digital or analog channel 9 in the United States:

- K09AI-D in Las Vegas, New Mexico
- K09BE-D in Ekalaka, Montana
- K09BG-D in Basin, Montana
- K09BI-D in Methow, Washington
- K09BX-D in Saco, Montana
- K09CJ-D in Cedar City, Utah
- K09DF-D in Juliaetta, Idaho
- K09DM-D in Cortez, Colorado
- K09DW-D in Ruth, Nevada
- K09DY-D in Westcliffe, Colorado
- K09EA-D in Ely & McGill, Nevada
- K09EP-D in Grants, etc., New Mexico
- K09ES-D in Cashmere, Washington
- K09FJ-D in Pioche, Nevada
- K09FK-D in Ursine, Nevada
- K09FL-D in Caliente, Nevada
- K09FQ-D in Thompson Falls, Montana
- K09HY-D in Glasgow, Montana
- K09IV-D in Plevna, Montana
- K09JG-D in Malta, Montana
- K09KJ-D in Tierra Amarilla, New Mexico
- K09LO-D in Cascade, Idaho
- K09LW-D in Martinsdale/Lennep, Montana
- K09MH-D in White Sulphur Springs, Montana
- K09MY-D in Polaris, Montana
- K09NH-D in Shungnak, Alaska
- K09NI-D in Mekoryuk, Alaska
- K09NK-D in Perryville, Alaska
- K09NO-D in Pilot Point, Alaska
- K09OT-D in Valdez, Alaska
- K09OV-D in Kotzebue, Alaska
- K09OW-D in Nome, Alaska
- K09OY-D in Colstrip, Montana
- K09PC-D in Grayling, Alaska
- K09PJ-D in Ouray, Colorado
- K09PL-D in Dingle, etc., Idaho
- K09PO-D in Chevak, Alaska
- K09QC-D in McGrath, Alaska
- K09QG-D in Chalkyitsik, Alaska
- K09QH-D in Kenai, Alaska
- K09QK-D in Karluk, Alaska
- K09QM-D in Nelson Lagoon, Alaska
- K09QP-D in Kake, Alaska
- K09QR-D in Gambell, Alaska
- K09QU-D in Togiak, Alaska
- K09QW-D in King Cove, Alaska
- K09QX-D in St. Michael, Alaska
- K09RA-D in Sand Point, Alaska
- K09RB-D in St. Paul, Alaska
- K09RC-D in Unalakleet, Alaska
- K09RE-D in St. George, Alaska
- K09RF-D in Eagle Village, Alaska
- K09RP-D in False Pass, Alaska
- K09SA-D in Koyuk, Alaska
- K09SD-D in Lemhi, etc., Idaho
- K09SG-D in Goodnews Bay, Alaska
- K09SL-D in Kotlik, Alaska
- K09SP-D in Igiugig, Alaska
- K09SR-D in Port Lions, Alaska
- K09SU-D in Hildale, etc., Utah
- K09TH-D in Gunnison, Colorado
- K09TK-D in Elfin Cove, Alaska
- K09TR-D in Kalskag, Alaska
- K09TT-D in Circle, Alaska
- K09TW-D in Venetie, Alaska
- K09TX-D in Kaltag, Alaska
- K09UP-D in Colville, Washington
- K09VC-D in Paisley, Oregon
- K09VL-D in Boyes & Hammond, Montana
- K09WB-D in Powderhorn, Colorado
- K09XK-D in Sheridan, Wyoming
- K09XL-D in Douglas, Wyoming
- K09XW-D in Palm Desert, etc., California
- K09XY-D in Coolin, Idaho
- K09YE-D in La Pine, Oregon
- K09YH-D in Scottsbluff, Nebraska
- K09YK-D in Durango/Purgatory, Colorado
- K09YO-D in Thomasville, Colorado
- K09YP-D in Mink Creek, Idaho
- K09YR-D in Harlowton, Montana
- K09YT-D in Sula, Montana
- K09YW-D in Leamington, Utah
- K09YZ-D in Beeville-Refugio, Texas
- K09ZA-D in Leavenworth, Washington
- K09ZB-D in Havre, Montana
- K09ZK-D in Long Valley Junction, Utah
- K09ZN-D in Blanding/Monticello, Utah
- K09ZO-D in Juab, Utah
- K09ZP-D in Sigurd & Salina, Utah
- K09ZQ-D in Marysvale, Utah
- K09ZR-D in Woodland & Kamas, Utah
- K09ZS-D in Gateway, Colorado
- K09ZT-D in Beaver, Utah
- K09ZU-D in East Price, Utah
- K09ZV-D in Helper, Utah
- K09ZW-D in Roosevelt, etc., Utah
- K09AAD-D in Sitka, Alaska
- K09AAF-D in Monterey, California
- KBCI-LD in Bonners Ferry, Idaho
- KBHO-LD in Richmond, Texas
- KBMN-LD in Houston, Texas
- KEBQ-LP in Beaumont, Texas
- KKCO in Paonia, Colorado
- KNPG-LD in Saint Joseph, Missouri
- KOPA-CD in Gillette, Wyoming
- KPDS-LD in Wolcott, Indiana
- KSDX-LD in San Diego, California
- KUBN-LD in Madras, Oregon
- KVVG-LD in Porterville, California
- KXLH-LD in Helena, Montana
- KXMN-LD in Spokane, etc., Washington
- W09AF-D in Sylva, North Carolina
- W09AG-D in Franklin, North Carolina
- W09AT-D in Fajardo, Puerto Rico
- W09CZ-D in Roslyn, New York
- W09DB-D in Williamsport, Pennsylvania
- W09DJ-D in Wilkes-Barre, etc., Pennsylvania
- W09DL-D in Mount Vernon, Illinois
- WBON-LD in Richmond, Kentucky
- WEQT-LD in Atlanta, Georgia
- WHCQ-LD in Cleveland, Mississippi
- WNGG-LD in Gouverneur, New York
- WNSH-LD in Nashville, Tennessee
- WOPI-CD in Kingsport, Tennessee/Bristol, Virginia
- WPVS-LD in Milwaukee, Wisconsin
- WRCX-LD in Dayton, Ohio

The following low-power stations, which are no longer licensed, formerly broadcast on digital or analog channel 9:

- K09AH in Aguilar, Colorado
- K09AK in Eagle Nest, New Mexico
- K09BJ-D in Entiat, Washington
- K09BQ in Helper, Utah
- K09BW in Forsyth, Montana
- K09CD in Rockville, Utah
- K09CL-D in Rock Island, Washington
- K09CS in Beaver, etc., Utah
- K09CX in Green River, Utah
- K09CY in Vernal, etc., Utah
- K09FF-D in Squilchuck St. Park, Washington
- K09FX in Circleville, Utah
- K09GK in White Bird, Idaho
- K09GW in Broken Bow, Nebraska
- K09HI in Jordan, etc., Montana
- K09HU in Hoehne, Colorado
- K09ID in Soda Springs, etc., Idaho
- K09IJ in La Barge, Wyoming
- K09JE in Palmer, Alaska
- K09JH in Mayfield, Utah
- K09JJ in Bloomfield, etc., New Mexico
- K09JR in Hazen, North Dakota
- K09KP in Toquerville, Utah
- K09LC in Hanksville, Utah
- K09LF in South Park, Wyoming
- K09LH in Manitou Springs, Colorado
- K09MG in Ridgecrest, etc., California
- K09MI in Jeffrey City, Wyoming
- K09MM in Paradise Valley, Nevada
- K09MO in Hatch, Utah
- K09MQ in Hanna, etc., Utah
- K09NE in Tatitlek, Alaska
- K09NF in Chitina, Alaska
- K09NG in Noatak, Alaska
- K09NV in Alton, Utah
- K09OK in Rosebud, etc., Montana
- K09OQ in Wrangell, Alaska
- K09OR in Cordova, Alaska
- K09OU in Petersburg, Alaska
- K09PD in Haines, Alaska
- K09PI in Happy Camp, etc., California
- K09PR in Nikolai, Alaska
- K09PX in Chistochina, Alaska
- K09QD-D in Huslia, Alaska
- K09QE-D in Larsen Bay, Alaska
- K09QF in Angoon, Alaska
- K09QI in Hydaburg, Alaska
- K09QJ in Mentasta Lake, Alaska
- K09QL-D in Allakaket, Alaska
- K09QN in Point Hope, Alaska
- K09QQ in Beaver, Alaska
- K09QY in Kaktovik, Alaska
- K09QZ in Kivalina, Alaska
- K09RD in Rampart, Alaska
- K09RG-D in Kongiganak, Alaska
- K09RH in Akutan, Alaska
- K09RK in Nikolski, Alaska
- K09RO in Teller, Alaska
- K09RS in Anaktuvuk Pass, Alaska
- K09RT in Nuiqsut, Alaska
- K09RV-D in Arctic Village, Alaska
- K09RY in Hughes, Alaska
- K09RZ in Shishmaref, Alaska
- K09SF in North Fork, etc., Wyoming
- K09SI in Cantwell, Alaska
- K09SK in Egegik, Alaska
- K09SN in Ivanof Bay, Alaska
- K09SO-D in Chignik Lagoon, Alaska
- K09SV in Stevens Village, Alaska
- K09SW in Tanunak, Alaska
- K09TE in Bettles, Alaska
- K09TI in Meyers Chuck, Alaska
- K09TM-D in Kakhonak, Alaska
- K09TQ in Manokotak, Alaska
- K09TU in Lake Louise, etc., Alaska
- K09TZ in Atkasuk, Alaska
- K09UA in Yakutat, Alaska
- K09UB-D in Whittier, Alaska
- K09UD in Akhiok, Alaska
- K09UE in Kasigluk, Alaska
- K09UF in Morro Bay, California
- K09VF in Samak, Utah
- K09VQ in Crescent City, California
- K09VW in Fish Lake Resort, Utah
- K09WJ in Escalante, Utah
- K09WP-D in Checkerboard, Montana
- K09XF in Henrieville, Utah
- K09XO-D in Homer, Alaska
- K09XS in Buena Vista & Salida, Colorado
- K09YJ in Mexican Hat, Utah
- K09YQ-D in Ketchikan, Alaska
- KMXT-LP in Kodiak, Alaska
- KRKG-LP in Lewiston, Missouri
- KUVU-LP in Eureka, California
- W09BB in Schroon Lake, New York
- W09CQ in Jamestown, Kentucky
- W09CT-D in Mathias, etc., West Virginia
- WWPS-LP in Hawley, Pennsylvania
- WWRP-LP in Tallahassee, Florida
