= Channel 3 branded TV stations in the United States =

The following television stations in the United States brand as channel 3 (though neither using virtual channel 3 nor broadcasting on physical RF channel 3):

- KBJR-DT2 in Duluth, Minnesota
- KESE-LD in Yuma, Arizona
- KESQ-TV in Palm Springs, California
- KRII-DT2 in Chisholm, Minnesota
- News-Press 3 NOW in St. Joseph, Missouri
- WMDT-DT2 in Salisbury, Maryland
- WSEE-DT2 in Erie, Pennsylvania

The following television stations in the United States formerly branded as channel 3:

- KNTV in San Francisco, California (O&O)
