= KCJO-CD =

Television station in St. Joseph, Missouri

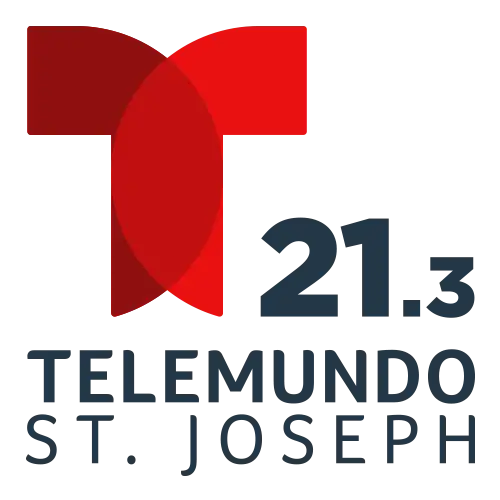
- St. Joseph, Missouri; United States
- Channels: Digital: 28 (UHF); Virtual: 30
- Branding: CBS 30 KCJO; News-Press Now on CBS 30 KCJO

Programming
- Affiliations: 30.1: CBS; for others, see § Subchannels

Ownership
- Owner: News-Press & Gazette Company; (News-Press TV, LLC)
- Sister stations: KNPN-CD, KNPG-CD, News-Press NOW

History
- First air date: January 1, 2014
- Former call signs: KNPG-LD (2014–2016); KBJO-LD (2016–2017); KCJO-LD (2017–2024)
- Former channel numbers: Digital: 30 (UHF, 2012–2018)
- Former affiliations: Telemundo (2014–2017)
- Call sign meaning: Cronkite or CBS; St. Joseph; (modified from the previous KBJO calls, which were also previously used as the original callsign of sister station KNPG-LD)

Technical information
- Licensing authority: FCC
- Facility ID: 188057
- Class: CD
- ERP: 1.75 kW
- HAAT: 73.6 m (241 ft)
- Transmitter coordinates: 39°45′2.8″N 94°50′25.8″W
- Translator(s): KNPN-CD 26.2 St. Joseph

Links
- Public license information: Public file; LMS
- Website: www.newspressnow.com/tv/

KCJO-CD (channel 30) is a low-power, Class A television station in St. Joseph, Missouri, United States, affiliated with CBS. It is owned by the locally based News-Press & Gazette Company (NPG) alongside fellow flagship outlets, NBC/CW+/Telemundo affiliate KNPG-CD (channel 21) and Fox affiliate KNPN-CD (channel 26). The three stations share studios at News-Press & Gazette's corporate headquarters (which also house operations for the St. Joseph News-Press and local news and weather channel News-Press NOW) on Edmond Street in downtown St. Joseph; KCJO-CD's transmitter is located on South 16th Street (adjacent to US 36), just southeast of downtown.

There are no separate websites for the three stations, instead they are integrated with that of the co-owned St. Joseph News-Press.

In addition to its own digital signal, KCJO-CD is simulcast in high definition on KNPN-CD's second digital subchannel (26.2) from the same transmitter site.

== History ==
The station traces its history back to June 2, 2012, when News-Press and Gazette Company signed on KNPN-LD as the St. Joseph market's Fox affiliate, the first broadcast television station to have been built and signed on by the locally based company. The station affiliated its fourth digital subchannel with Telemundo, which replaced the network's national feed on local cable providers as the Spanish-language network did not have an existing affiliate in Missouri.

On December 19, 2012, News-Press & Gazette acquired a low-power digital television license in St. Joseph, K30ND-D from DTV America 1, LLC of Sunrise, Florida; concurrent with the consummation of the purchase, the station's call letters were changed to KNPG-LD (in reference to its parent company).

The station signed on the air on January 1, 2014. In addition to carrying programming on its main signal in high definition, Telemundo programming continued to be simulcast in HD over KNPN's third digital subchannel (which replaced CW programming on that subchannel after KBJO-LD signed on in March 2013). Although both stations are low-power, the coverage area of KNPN is still significantly larger than that of KNPG. Low-power television stations are exempt from the must-carry and retransmission consent regulations that full-power stations enjoy, meaning that KNPG's carriage on other area cable systems besides Suddenlink and satellite providers is not guaranteed.

On August 18, 2016, News-Press and Gazette Company announced that it would transfer the KNPG-LD callsign to its CW-affiliated sister station on channel 21, then KBJO-LD, as part of that station's conversion into the market's first locally based NBC affiliate (channel 21 joined the network on November 1 of that year, with The CW Plus feed moving to a newly created digital subchannel). The CW affiliation was moved to subchannel 21.2 and KBJO-LD's callsign was relocated to channel 30, which continued as a Telemundo affiliate.

=== Conversion to CBS as KCJO-LD ===
On February 24, 2017, News-Press & Gazette Company announced that KBJO would switch its primary affiliation to CBS on June 1. The move would return the network to the area for the first time since June 1967, when KFEQ-TV (channel 2, now KQTV)—which had been affiliated with CBS since its sign-on in September 1953—became a full-time ABC affiliate; the network's Kansas City affiliate, KCTV (channel 5), which provides city-grade signal coverage in St. Joseph proper, had served as the area's default CBS station since that point. Soon after, it was also announced that KBJO would change its call letters to KCJO-LD on that date, to reflect its CBS affiliation. Channel 30 officially switched to CBS at 12:01 a.m. on June 1. The move resulted in a digital subchannel realignment among the News-Press and Gazette Company's other St. Joseph stations: KCJO-LD's former Telemundo affiliation moved to sister station KNPG-LD, which began carrying the network on a new LD3 subchannel, while the simulcast of KCJO-LD's main feed was moved to KNPN-LD2, in light of KCJO-LD's severely low-powered status.

To commemorate the affiliation switch, the Walter Cronkite Memorial at Missouri Western State University partnered with News-Press and Gazette Company to celebrate the relaunch by allowing the morning and 6 p.m. editions of News-Press Now (the shared news operation between KCJO, KNPN-LD, KNPG-LD and co-owned news channel News-Press NOW) to be broadcast from the memorial, which would highlight St. Joseph native and former CBS Evening News anchor Walter Cronkite's history with the city and his news career. As NPG already controls the market's Fox, NBC and CW+ affiliations respectively through KNPN and KNPG, the move gave the St. Joseph area in-market affiliates of five of the six major English-language commercial broadcast networks; the MyNetworkTV programming service—which is received in the area through KCTV's Gray Television-owned sister station KSMO-TV (channel 62)—became the outlier among the country's conventional broadcast networks without a local affiliate in St. Joseph (KSMO-TV is receivable over-the-air and on Suddenlink Communications in the St. Joseph market).

== News operation ==
KCJO-CD broadcasts 17 hours of locally produced newscasts each week (with three hours on weekdays and one hour on Saturdays and Sundays). The news department shared by KCJO-CD, KNPN-CD and KNPG-CD also utilizes reporting and coverage resources from the St. Joseph News-Press, and also shares content with co-owned local news channel News-Press NOW, with all news programming carried by the properties produced in-house at the station's Edmond Street studios.

Although the station is co-owned with KNPN-CD, which has produced its own newscasts since it launched in June 2012, KBJO-LD did not broadcast any newscasts during its affiliation with Telemundo, with the only news content aired on the station consisting of the network's national morning and evening news programs as well as its breaking news coverage. This changed when channel 30 was relaunched as CBS affiliate KCJO on June 1, 2017, when the station implemented a news schedule consisting of simulcasts from its two sister broadcast stations. It began simulcasting the first 90 minutes of KNPN's weekday morning newscast (which runs on that station for 2 1/2 hours, with the remaining hour airing exclusively on channel 26 as KCJO-LD airs CBS Mornings during the 7 a.m. hour of the broadcast) and its half-hour 5 p.m. newscast (the weekend editions of which do not air on KNPN-LD due partly to frequent pre-emptions on channel 26 caused by predetermined or gameplay-caused overruns by Fox Sports event broadcasts). It also began simulcasting the weeknight 6 p.m. and nightly 10 p.m. newscasts that it had begun producing for KNPG-LD when it joined NBC in November 2016.

== Subchannels ==
The station's signal is multiplexed:

Subchannels of KCJO-CD
Subchannel	Res.	Short name	Programming
30.1	1080i	KCJO	CBS
30.2	480i	DCJO	Dabl
30.3	1080i	KCJOTEL	Telemundo (KNPG-CD)

Simulcast of subchannels of another station
