= KNPG-CD =

Television station in St. Joseph, Missouri

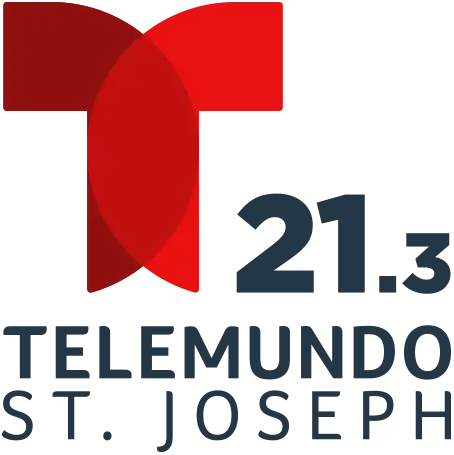
- St. Joseph, Missouri; United States
- Channels: Digital: 9 (VHF); Virtual: 21
- Branding: NBC 21 KNPG; News-Press Now on NBC 21 KNPG; St. Joseph CW 6 (21.2); Telemundo St. Joseph (21.3)

Programming
- Affiliations: 21.1: NBC; for others, see § Subchannels

Ownership
- Owner: News-Press & Gazette Company; (News-Press TV, LLC)
- Sister stations: KNPN-CD, KCJO-CD, News-Press NOW

History
- First air date: September 21, 1998 (as cable-only "WBJO"); June 2, 2012 (as a digital subchannel of KNPN-LD); March 7, 2013 (as standalone low-power station)
- Former call signs: "WBJO" (1998–2013); KBJO-LD (2013–2016); KNPG-LD (2016–2024)
- Former channel numbers: Digital: 16 (UHF, 2013–2019)
- Former affiliations: The WB (via The WB 100+; as "WBJO", 1998–2006); The CW (via The CW Plus; as "WBJO", 2006–2012; as a broadcast station, 2012–2016)
- Call sign meaning: News-Press & Gazette Company

Technical information
- Facility ID: 188055
- Class: CD
- ERP: 3 kW
- HAAT: 74.6 m (245 ft)
- Transmitter coordinates: 39°45′2.8″N 94°50′25.8″W

Links
- Website: www.newspressnow.com/tv/

KNPG-CD (channel 21) is a low-power, Class A television station in St. Joseph, Missouri, United States, affiliated with NBC, The CW Plus and Telemundo. It is owned by the locally based News-Press & Gazette Company (NPG) alongside fellow flagship properties, Fox affiliate KNPN-CD (channel 26) and CBS affiliate KCJO-CD (channel 30). The three stations share studios at News-Press & Gazette's corporate headquarters (which also house operations for the St. Joseph News-Press and local news and weather channel News-Press NOW) on Edmond Street in downtown St. Joseph; KNPG-CD's transmitter is located on South 16th Street (adjacent to US 36), just southeast of downtown.

There are no separate websites for the three stations, instead they are integrated with that of the co-owned St. Joseph News-Press.

== History ==
=== Early history ===
The station's history traces back to the September 21, 1998, launch of a cable-only affiliate of The WB that was originally managed and promoted by St. Joseph Cablevision (a cable television provider that was owned by the News-Press & Gazette Company), alongside the launch of The WB 100+ Station Group, a service similar to The CW Plus that was created to expand national coverage of The WB via primarily local origination channels managed by cable providers in markets ranked above #100 by Nielsen Media Research. Since it was a cable-exclusive outlet that was not licensed by the Federal Communications Commission, the channel used the callsign "WBJO" in a fictional manner. Before the sign-on of the cable-only WBJO, viewers in the St. Joseph area received their WB network programs via Superstation WGN, and in September 1996, KCWB when the station began broadcasting, then from KSMO-TV when that station dropped UPN and picked up the WB from KCWB, in which it changed the call letters to KCWE two years later.

On January 24, 2006, Time Warner and CBS Corporation announced that the two companies would shut down their respective networks, The WB and UPN, to create The CW Television Network, which would feature programs from its two predecessors as well as new series that were specifically produced for The CW. The CW Plus was created by the network as a replacement for The WB 100+ Station Group to allow the existing cable outlets as well as low-power analog stations and digital subchannels of major network affiliates in smaller markets that had joined The WB 100+ in the years following its launch to maintain a network affiliation; "WBJO" affiliated with The CW Plus on September 18, 2006, upon the launch of The CW.

Prior to the launch of KNPN-LD, residents in the St. Joseph market who received programming over-the-air or subscribed to other television providers besides Suddenlink viewed CW programming through out-of-market stations: some rural cable systems carried KCWE from the nearby Kansas City market (which provides at least grade B signal coverage to much of the St. Joseph market); the default CW outlet for local DirecTV subscribers was Omaha's KXVO, while Dish Network carried New York City affiliate WPIX, Los Angeles affiliate KTLA and Denver affiliate KWGN-TV as default affiliates through their carriage on its superstation package in lieu of regional affiliates located within proximity to St. Joseph. Upon the sale of News-Press & Gazette Company's cable television operations (which served St. Joseph, and parts of Arizona and California) to Suddenlink Communications in 2011 for $350 million, Suddenlink also acquired ownership of "WBJO" and sister cable outlet News-Press 3 NOW.

On March 19, 2012, News-Press & Gazette Company announced that it would launch a Fox-affiliated television station in St. Joseph to serve as the flagship of its television station group, which would also carry affiliations with The CW and Spanish-language network Telemundo on digital subchannels; the station was created using the license of K26LV-D (now KNPN-LD). On June 1, 2012, News-Press & Gazette Company confirmed that The CW Plus would be carried on its third digital subchannel, retaining the "St. Joseph's CW 6" branding; although the satellite providers carry KNPN's main signal, DirecTV and Dish Network did not sign carriage agreements to offer KNPN-LD3 (and subsequently KBJO-LD), CW programming continued to be offered through out-of-market stations as a result. The subchannel officially debuted at 6 a.m. on June 2, 2012, with News-Press & Gazette assuming promotional and advertising control of "WBJO" from Suddenlink Communications with the subsequent sign-on of KNPN-LD digital subchannel 26.3. It remained available on Suddenlink cable channel 6 (a high definition feed of the channel was also provided to Suddenlink subscribers on digital cable channel 606).

=== KNPG-LD history ===
==== As KBJO-LD ====
On March 14, 2012, concurrent with its acquisition of K26LV-D, News-Press & Gazette also purchased the low-power digital license of K16KF-D from DTV America 1, LLC of Sunrise, Florida; the purchase price for both stations was $72,000. Two weeks earlier on February 29, the FCC granted the company's construction permit application to relocate the two stations' transmitter facilities from a tower near Mound City to the St. Joseph transmitter and upgrade the effective radiated power of both stations.

Channel 16 first signed on the air on March 7, 2013, concurrent with the change of K16KF-D's callsign to KBJO-LD (adapted from the predecessor cable channel's branding). Concurrent with KBJO's sign-on, KNPN-LD dropped CW programming from its second subchannel. Low-power television stations are exempt from the must-carry and retransmission consent regulations that full-power stations enjoy, meaning that its carriage on other area cable systems besides Suddenlink, and satellite providers is not guaranteed.

==== Switch to NBC affiliation as KNPG-LD ====
On August 18, 2016, the News-Press & Gazette Company announced that it had reached an affiliation agreement with NBC, under which channel 21 would become the network's affiliate for the St. Joseph market, giving the market its first locally based NBC affiliate. Concurrent with the change, the station's call letters would be changed from KBJO-LD to KNPG-LD, which had been assigned to its Telemundo-affiliated sister station on channel 30. On November 1 of that year, when the callsign and network affiliation change took effect, the CW Plus affiliation moved to a newly created subchannel on virtual channel 21.2; the KBJO-LD callsign was transferred to its sister station on channel 30.

KNPG-LD displaced KSHB-TV (channel 41) – which is among the seven full-power Kansas City stations that provide city-grade signal coverage in St. Joseph proper – as the area's default NBC station on Suddenlink Communications, DirecTV and Dish Network. However, KSHB – which has served as the network's default affiliate for St. Joseph since it assumed the NBC affiliation from WDAF-TV (channel 4) in September 1994 – continues to act as an alternate NBC affiliate for the market as its transmitter produces a city-grade signal that reaches St. Joseph proper; however, the switch resulted in NBC programs carried on KSHB being blacked out to comply with programming duplication regulations imposed by the FCC. The move left MyNetworkTV as the outlier among the six major broadcast networks without a local affiliate in St. Joseph.

Subsequently, on June 1, 2017, KNPG took over the local affiliation rights to Telemundo, which had been carried on its sister station on channel 30 (as KBJO-LD) until it converted into a CBS affiliate as KCJO-LD on that date, through the activation of a new third subchannel.

== News operation ==
KNPG-CD presently broadcasts 17 hours of locally produced newscasts each week (with three hours on weekdays and one hour on Saturdays and Sundays). The news department shared by KNPG-CD, KNPN-CD and KCJO-CD also utilizes reporting and coverage resources from the St. Joseph News-Press, and also shares content with co-owned local news channel News-Press NOW, with all news programming carried by the properties produced in-house at the station's Edmond Street studios.

As KBJO-LD, the station did not broadcast any newscasts from parent station KNPN-LD (being a CW affiliate at the time, channel 21 would have been precluded from airing much news programming in any event, since Fox affiliate KNPN already produced morning and prime time newscasts that air in time periods where stations affiliated with Fox and The CW typically carry local news as neither network has a morning news-talk program or a third hour of prime time network programming on weekdays).

However, after News-Press and Gazette relaunched channel 21 as NBC affiliate KNPG-LD on November 1, 2016, KNPN began providing simulcasts of local news programs originating on that station as well as additional newscasts produced exclusively for KNPG, using the former's existing news department staff. On that date, it began simulcasting the first 90 minutes of KNPN's weekday morning newscast (which runs on that station for 2 1/2 hours, with the remaining hour airing exclusively on channel 26 as KNPG airs Today during the 7 a.m. hour of the broadcast) and its half-hour 5 p.m. newscast (the weekend editions of which moved to KNPG following the switch, due partly to frequent preemptions on channel 26 caused by predetermined or gameplay-caused overruns by Fox Sports event broadcasts). In addition, KNPG-LD also began producing exclusive half-hour newscasts at 6 p.m. weeknights and at 10 p.m. seven nights a week. CBS affiliate KCJO-LD subsequently began simulcasting all of the news programs carried by KNPG, when the former Telemundo affiliate was relaunched as a CBS station on June 1, 2017.

== Subchannels ==
The station's signal is multiplexed:

Subchannels of KNPG-CD
Subchannel	Res.	Short name	Programming
21.1	1080i	KNPG	NBC
21.2	720p	KNPG-CW	The CW Plus
21.3	1080i	KNPGTEL	Telemundo
21.4	480i	QNPGBNC	Bounce TV
21.5	480i	SNPGRIT	Grit

As TBN owned-and-operated station KTAJ-TV's virtual channel is mapped as "16" (its former analog channel assignment), KNPG-LD (as KBJO-LD) signed on as virtual channel 21.1 (which is also KTAJ's physical digital channel) to avoid channel mapping redundancies with KTAJ.

== See also ==
- Channel 9 digital TV stations in the United States
- Channel 9 low-power TV stations in the United States
- Channel 21 virtual TV stations in the United States
