= St. Joseph, Missouri =

City in Missouri, U.S.

- City
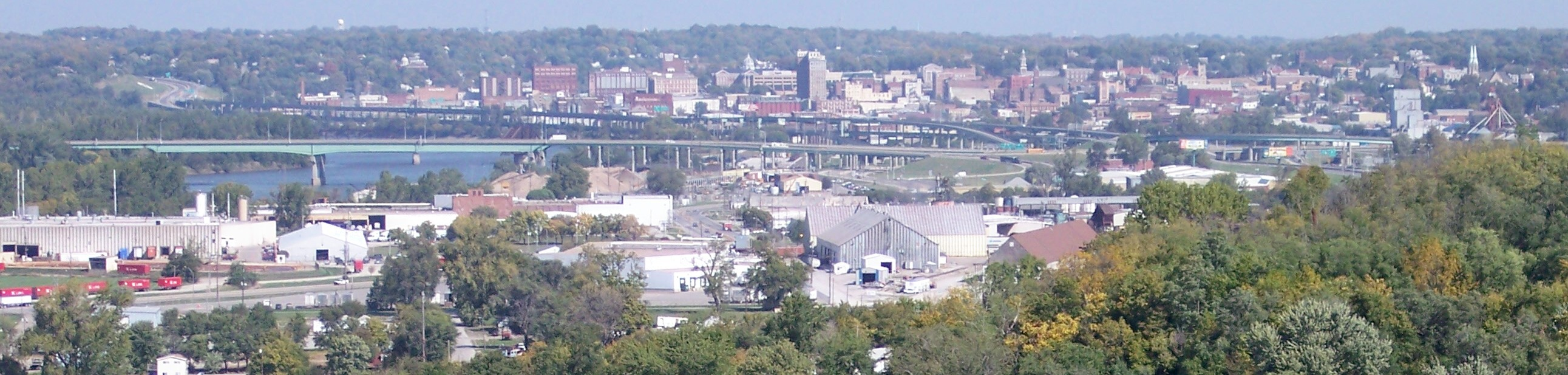
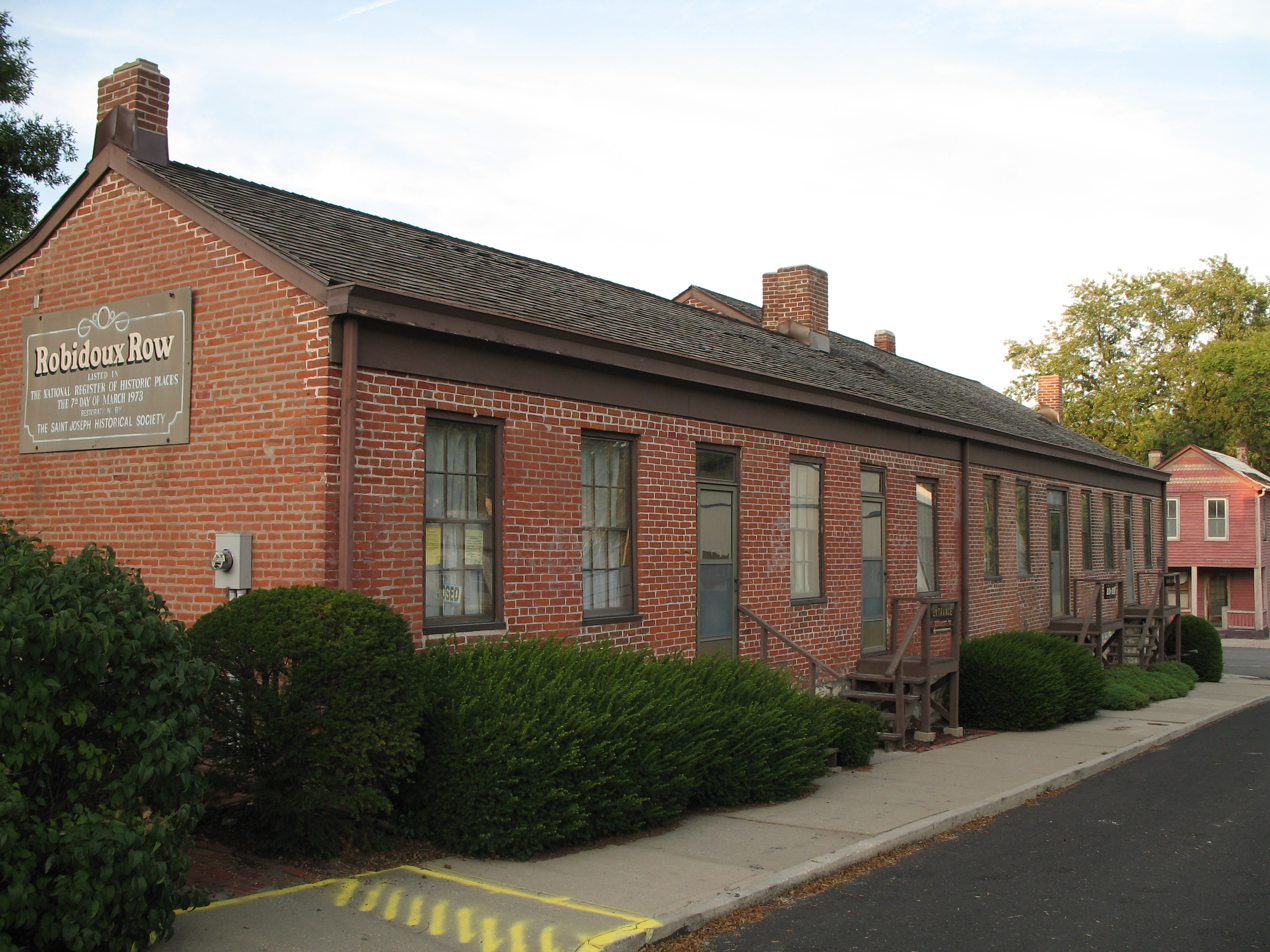
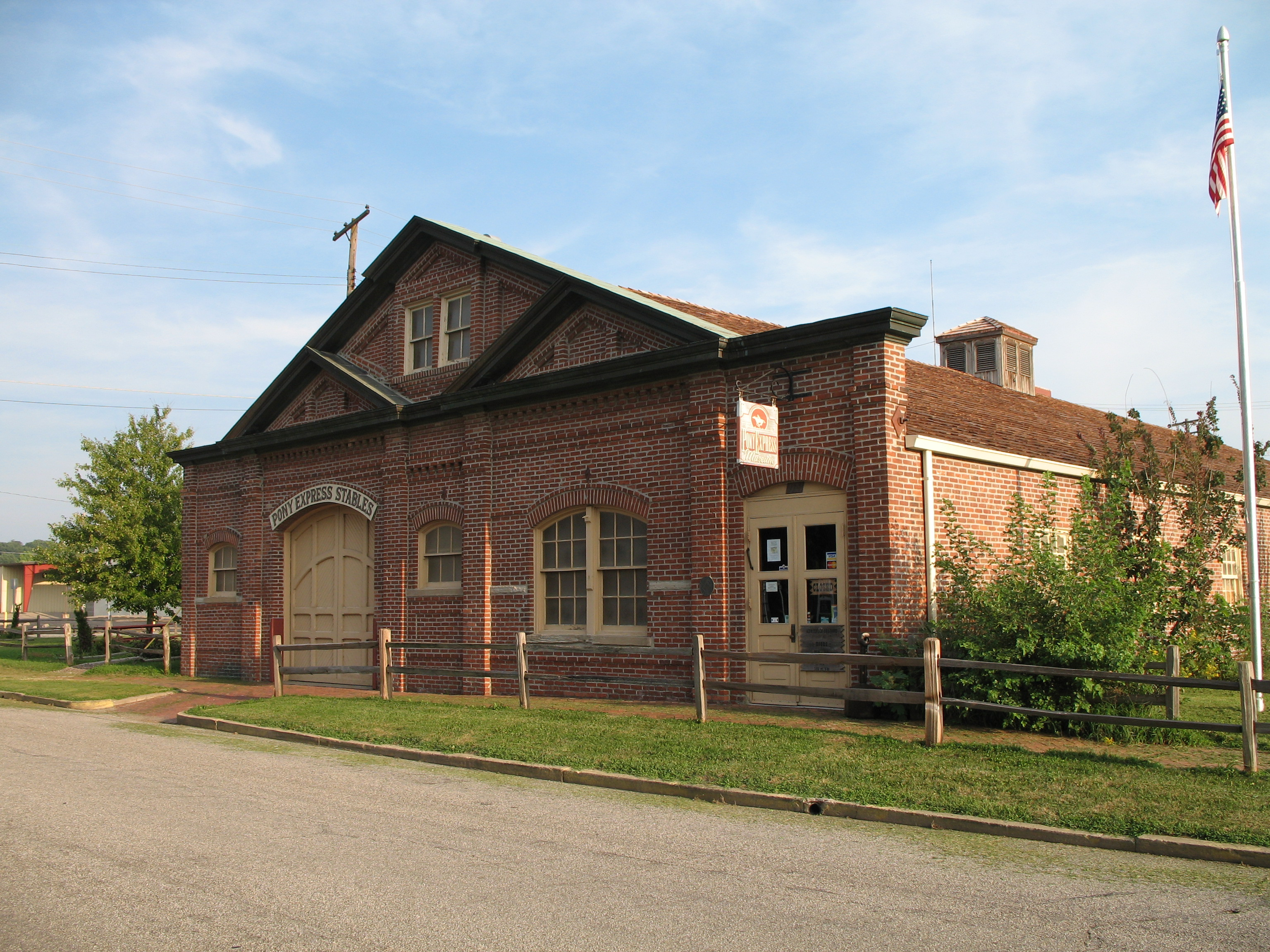
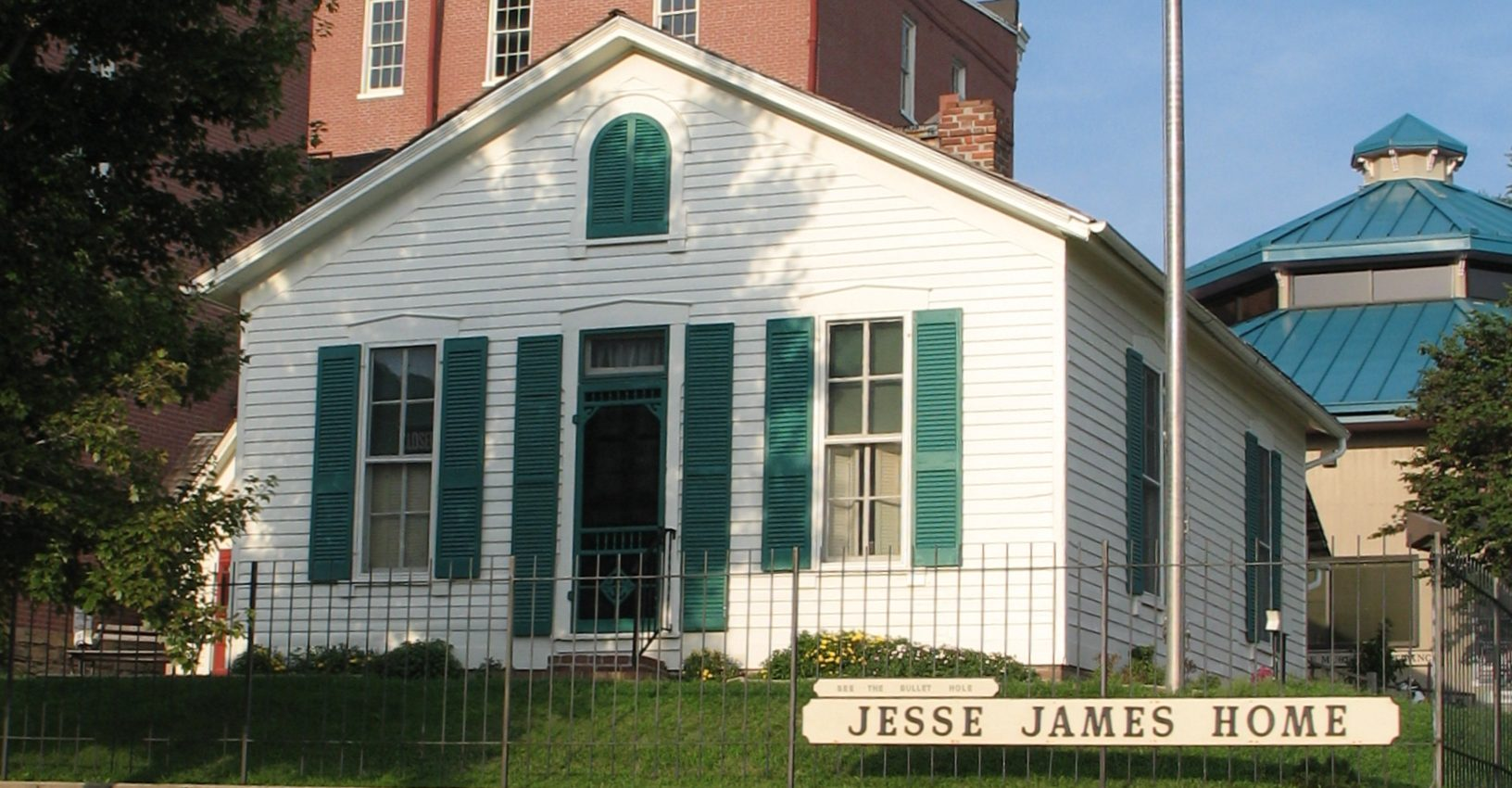
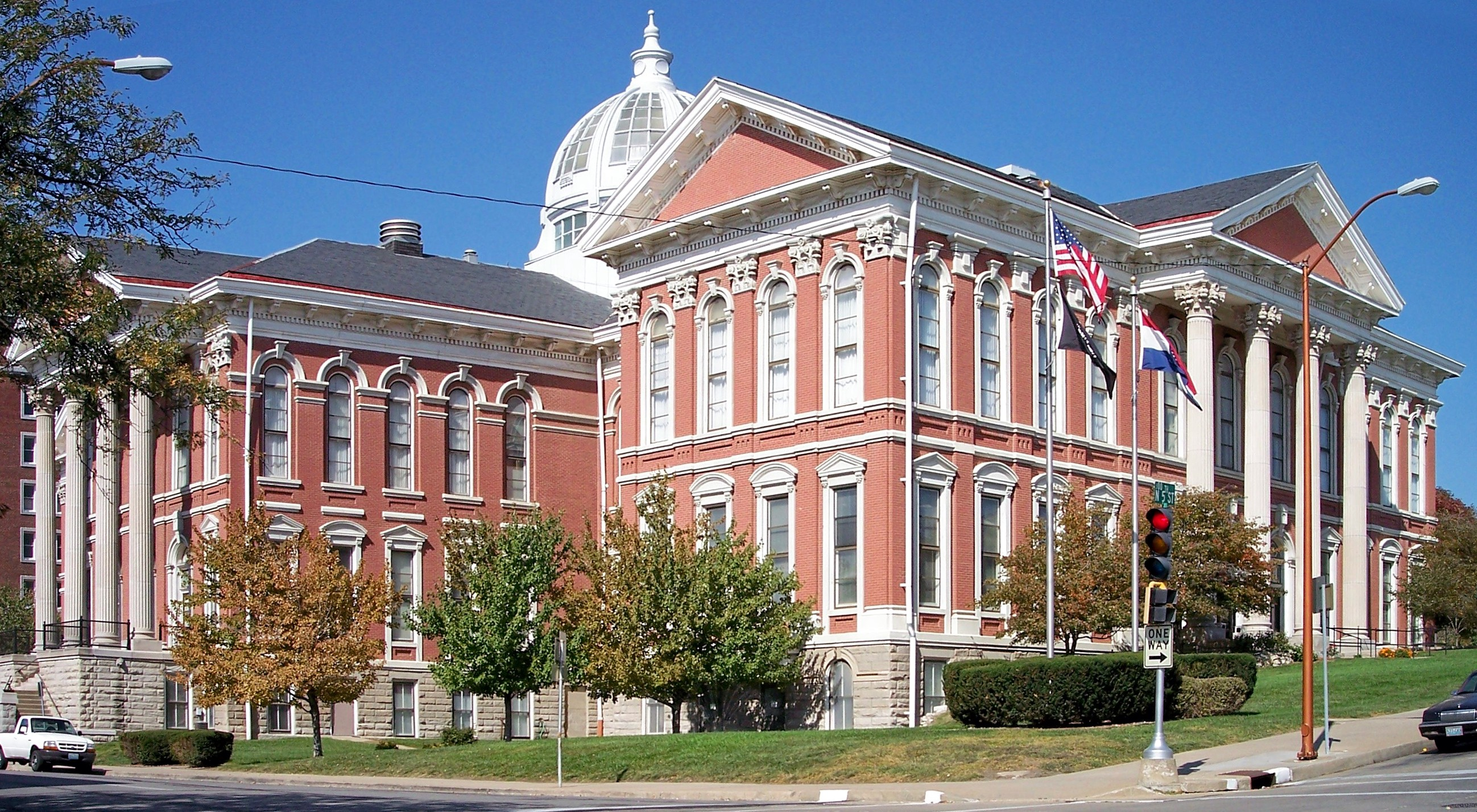
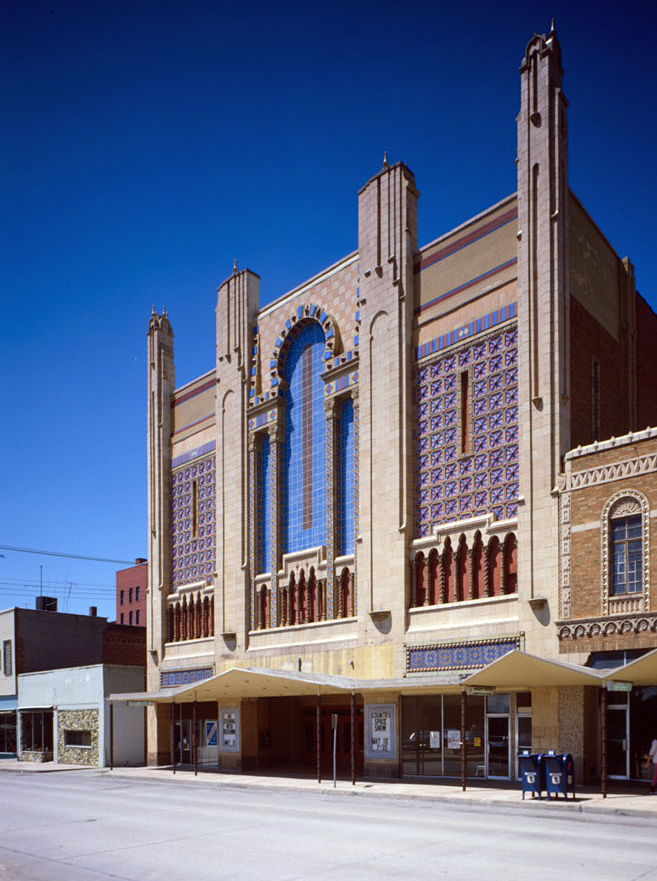
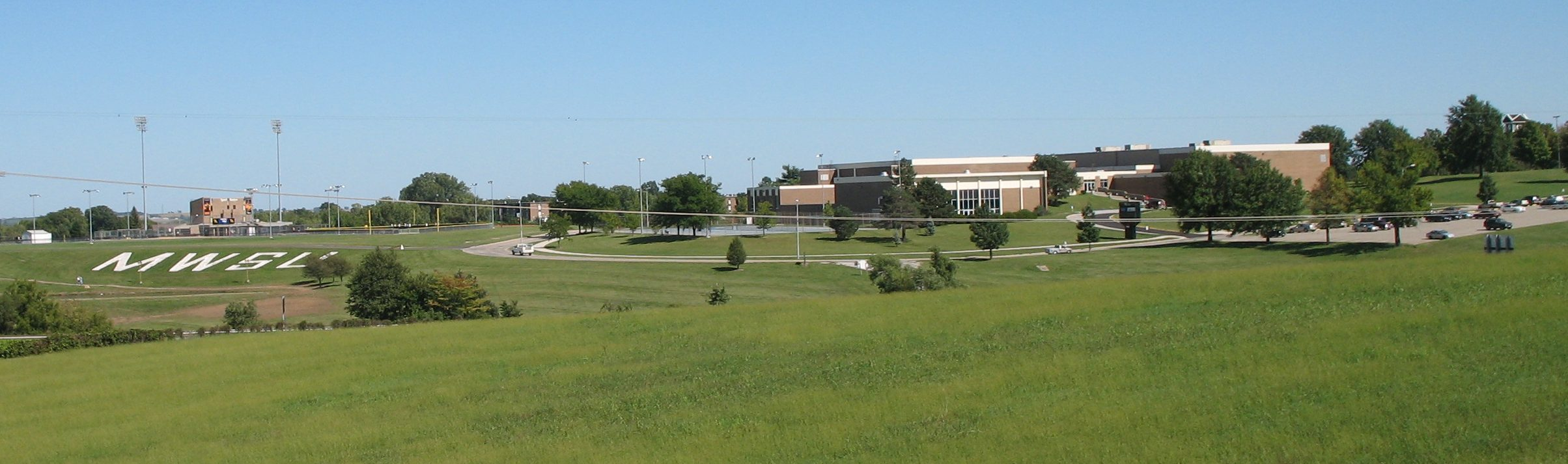
- Downtown St. Joseph, the Missouri River, and the Pony Express Bridge viewed from King Hill Robidoux Row Pony Express Museum Jesse James Home Museum Buchanan County Courthouse Missouri Theater Missouri Western State University

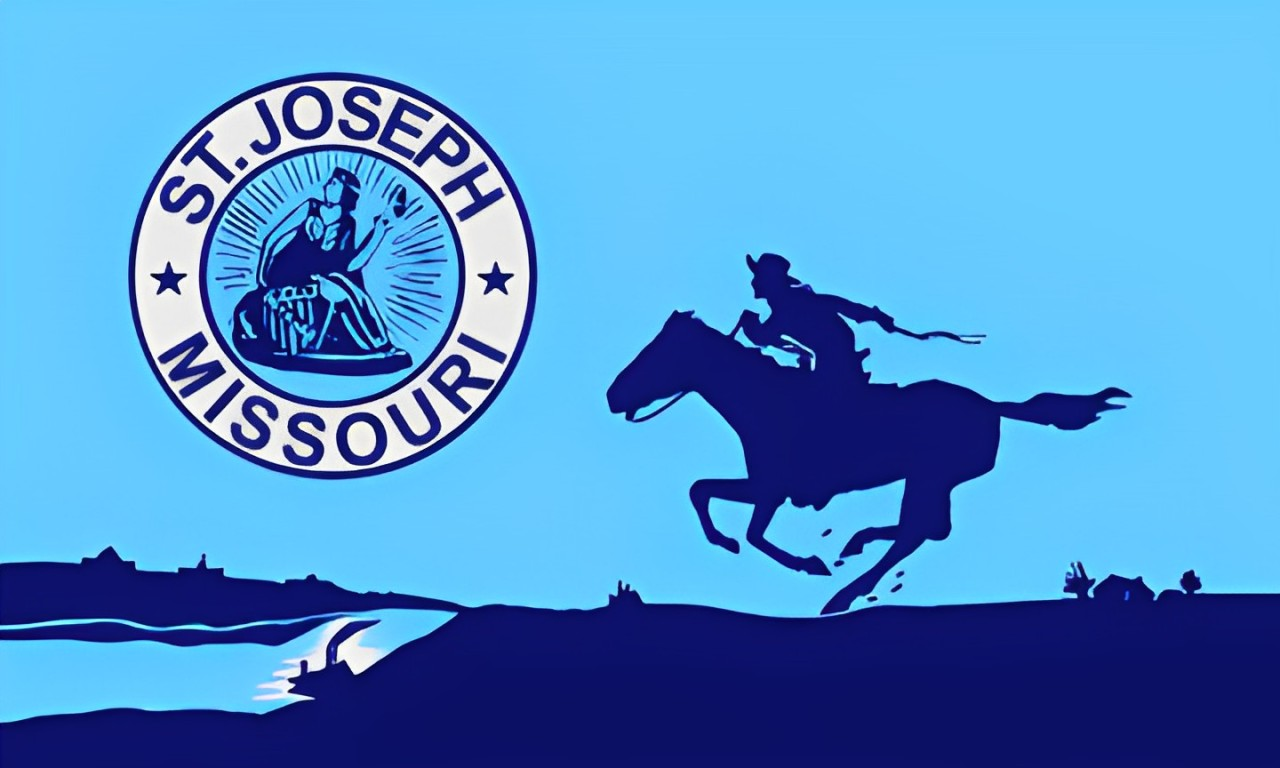
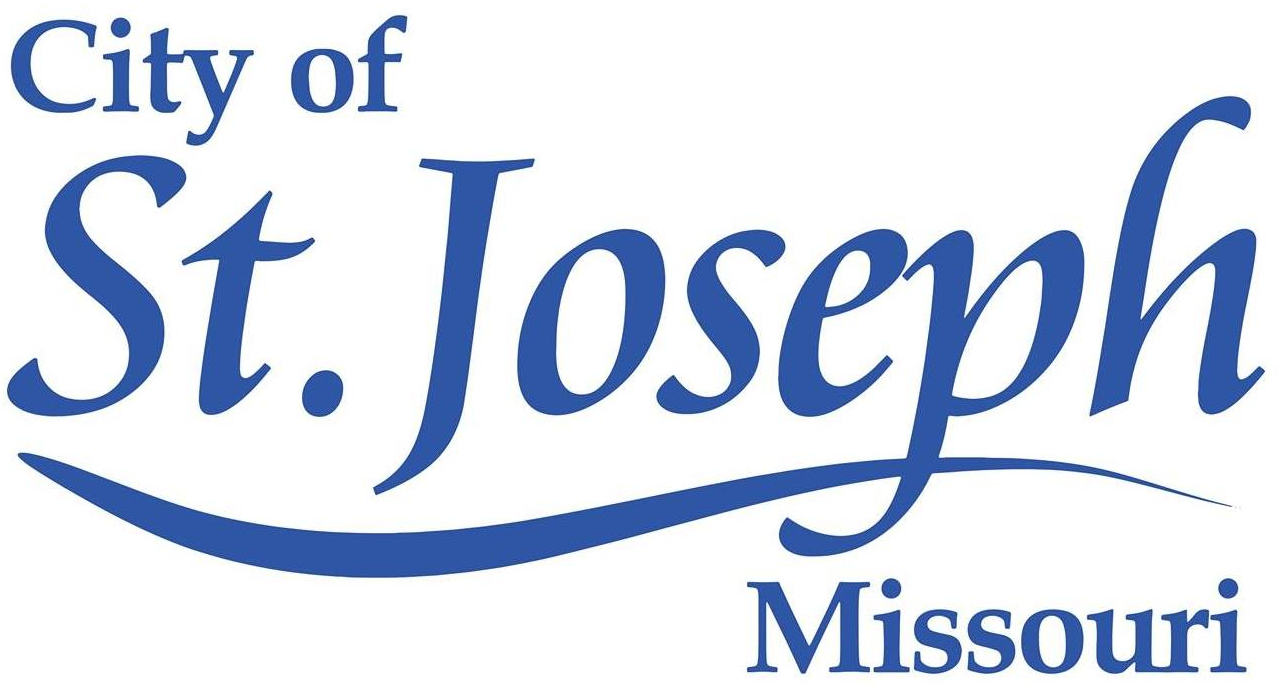
- Flag Seal Logo
- Nicknames: St. Joe; The City Worthwhile
- Motto: "Where the Pony Express started and Jesse James ended."
- Location of St. Joseph in Missouri

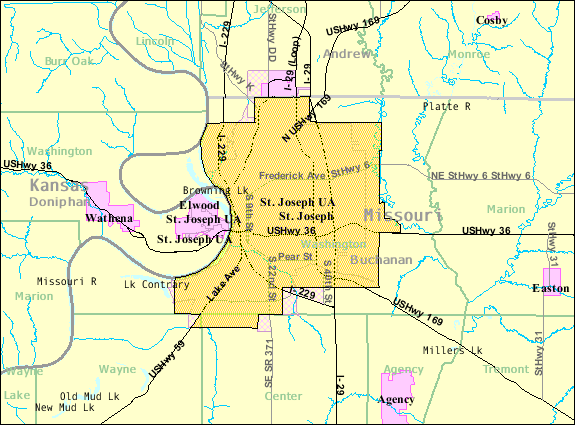
- US Census map

- Location within Missouri Location within the United States
- Coordinates: 39°45′29″N 94°50′12″W
- Country: United States
- State: Missouri
- County: Buchanan
- Incorporated: 1843; 183 years ago
- Named for: Joseph Robidoux IV and Saint Joseph

Government
  - Mayor: Larry Miller

Area
  - Total: 44.82 sq mi (116.09 km^{2})
  - Land: 44.03 sq mi (114.05 km^{2})
  - Water: 0.79 sq mi (2.04 km^{2})
- Elevation: 889 ft (271 m)

Population (2020)
  - Total: 72,473
  - Estimate (2025): 71,344
  - Density: 1,645.8/sq mi (635.43/km^{2})
- Demonym: St. Josephian
- Time zone: UTC−6 (CST)
  - Summer (DST): UTC−5 (CDT)
- ZIP Code: 64501-64508
- Area codes: 816, 975
- FIPS code: 29-64550
- GNIS feature ID: 2396498
- Website: stjosephmo.gov

St. Joseph is a city in and the county seat of Buchanan County, Missouri, United States. Located on the Missouri River, it is the principal city of the St. Joseph Metropolitan Statistical Area, which includes Buchanan, Andrew, and DeKalb counties in Missouri and Doniphan County, Kansas. As of the 2020 census, St. Joseph had a population of 72,473, making it the 8th most populous city in the state, and the 3rd most populous in Northwest Missouri. St. Joseph is located roughly 30 miles (48 km) north of the Kansas City, Missouri city limits and approximately 125 miles (201 km) south of Omaha, Nebraska.

The city was named after the town's founder Joseph Robidoux and the biblical Saint Joseph. In the nineteenth century, it was the death place of American outlaw Jesse James. It was also the starting point of the Pony Express serving the West. Today, St. Joseph is home to Missouri Western State University, which enrolls over 3,800 students.

== History ==
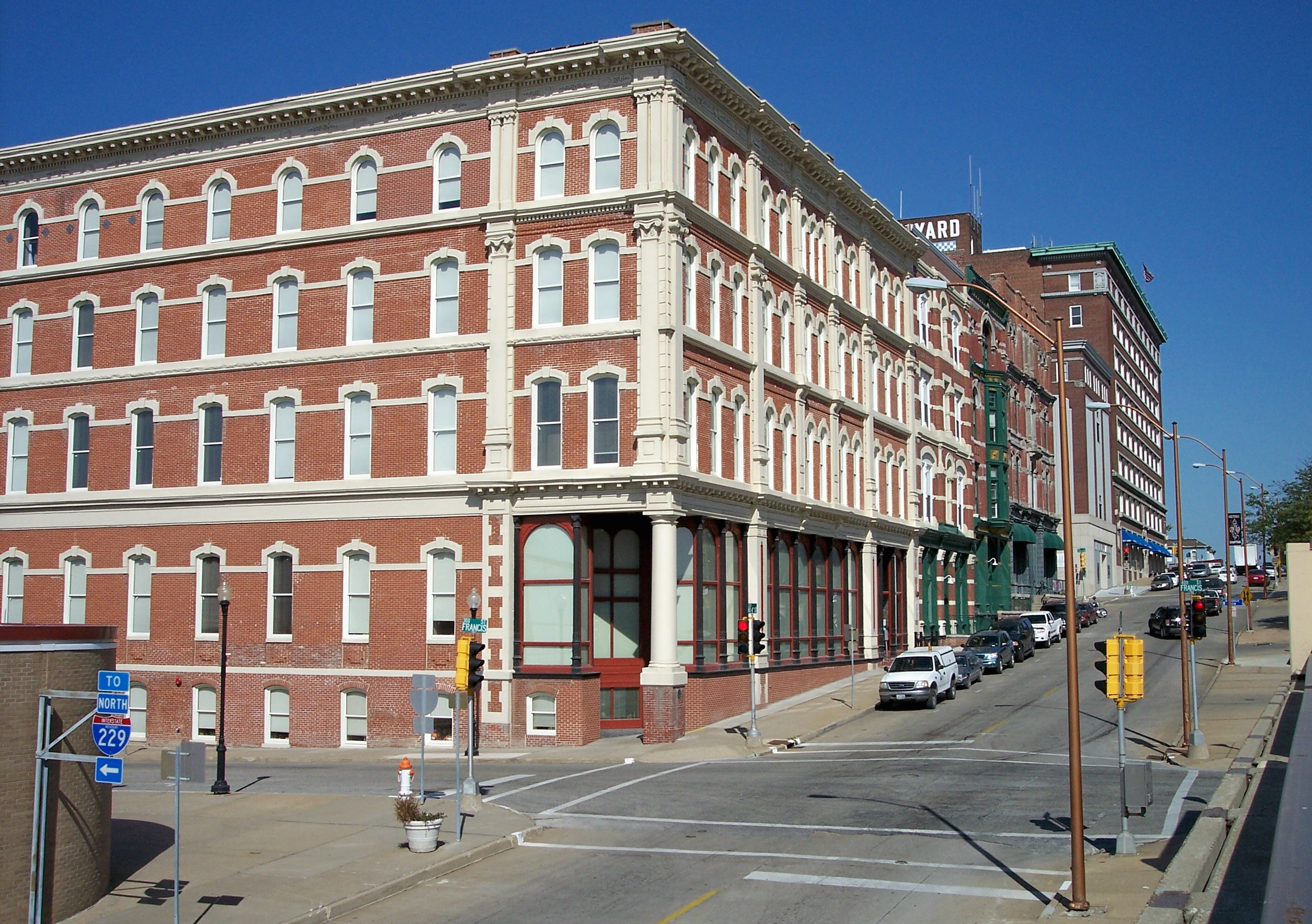
The intersection of Francis and North 4th streets in downtown St. Joseph

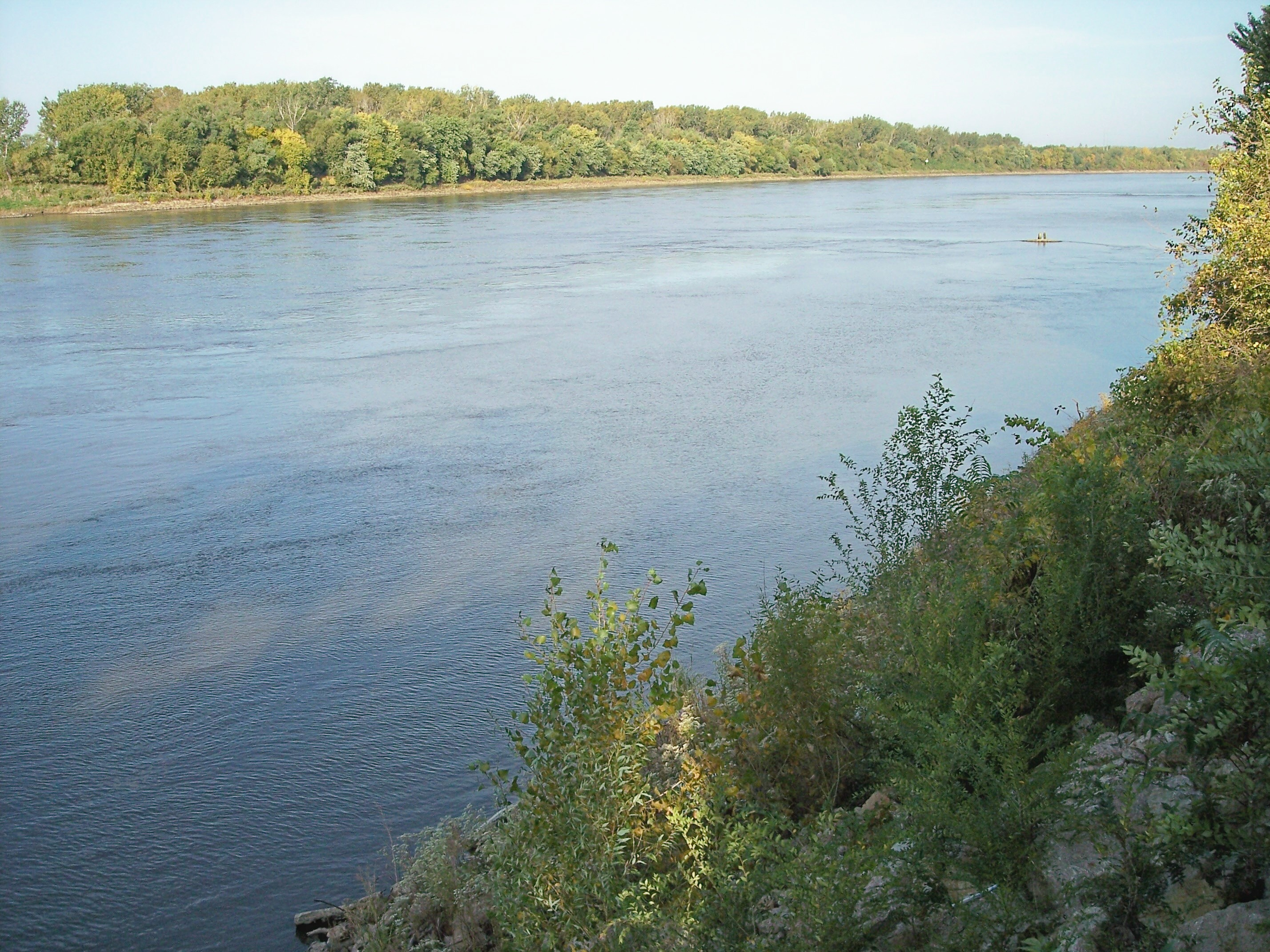
The Missouri River in St. Joseph

St. Joseph was founded on the Missouri River by Joseph Robidoux, a local fur trader of French Canadian descent. It was officially incorporated in 1843. In its early days, it was a bustling outpost and rough frontier town, serving as a last supply point and jumping-off point for travelers on the Missouri River toward the "Wild West". It was the westernmost point in the United States accessible by rail until after the American Civil War, which helped earn it the designation "Gateway to the West."

The main east–west downtown streets were named for Robidoux's eight children: Faraon, Jules, Francois (Francis), Felix, Edmond, Charles, Sylvanie, and Messanie. The street between Sylvanie and Messanie was named for his second wife, Angelique.

St. Joseph, or "St. Joe", as it was called by many, was a "Jumping-Off Point" for those migrants headed to the Oregon Territory in the mid-1800s. Such cities, including Independence, and St. Joseph, were where pioneers would stay and purchase supplies before they headed out in wagon trains across the Great Plains. The town was a very lively place.

Between April 3, 1860, and late October 1861, St. Joseph was one of the two endpoints of the Pony Express, which operated for a short period over the land then inaccessible by rail, to provide fast mail service. Today the Pony Express Museum hosts visitors in the former stables of the company. St. Joseph is identified by the slogan, "Where the Pony Express started and Jesse James ended."

The town's main hotel was Patee House. In the post-Civil War years, when the economy was down, the hotel was used for a time by the Patee Female College. It was occupied by the St. Joseph Female College up to 1880.

In 1874 the State Lunatic Asylum #2 was opened just East of St. Joseph. The asylum, originally built for 250 patients, opened its doors with more than 300. The asylum was mostly self-sustaining with three large farms, power plant, fire department, metal shops, wood shops, dairy and more, all worked by the patients. Over the decades the asylum grew rapidly, reaching its peak of close to 3,000 patients by the 1940s. In 1968 occupational therapist George Glore, with the help of his patients, recreated several historic treatment devices for Mental Health Awareness Month. This was the start of the Glore Psychiatric Museum. Now the largest museum of its kind in the world, the museum shows the history mental health treatment and still houses the original exhibits created by George Glore and his patients.

Outlaw Jesse James lived here under the alias "Mr. Howard". The song, "Jesse James", includes the lines, "...that dirty little coward that shot Mr. Howard has laid poor Jesse in his grave." On April 3, 1882, James was killed at his home, originally located at 1318 Lafayette. It has been relocated next to the Patee House and still has the visible bullet hole from the fatal shot. It is now operated as the Jesse James Home Museum.

The Heaton-Bowman-Smith Funeral Home maintains a small museum about Jesse James. Their predecessors conducted his funeral.

St. Joseph was the second city in the US to install electric streetcars; regular service was initiated on July 4, 1888. Among properties listed on the National Register of Historic Places are Robidoux Row, buildings owned by the founder and used for his family trading and mercantile business; the Patee House, now serving as a museum displaying St. Joseph's history, and the Missouri Theatre, an ornate movie palace. The Walnut Park Farm Historic District near St. Joseph was listed on the National Register of Historic Places in 1999.

St. Joseph's population peaked in 1900, with a census population of 102,979. This population figure is questionable, as civic leaders were known to have tried to raise the numbers for that census. At the time, Saint Joseph was home to one of the largest wholesale companies in the Midwest, the Nave & McCord Mercantile Company, as well as the Hannibal and St. Joseph Railroad, and the C.D. Smith & Company. C.D. Smith later became C.D. Smith Healthcare.

Prior to 1954 and desegregation, Bartlett High School served St. Joseph's African American students. It became Horace Mann Elementary with desegregation. You can learn about the Bartlett School at the Black Archives Museum of St. Joseph. St. Joseph's African American community leaders and Nathaniel C. Bruce were involved in and supported the establishment of Bartlett Agricultural and Industrial School in Dalton, Missouri. It was modeled after Tuskegee Institute and Hampton Institute.

== Geography and climate ==
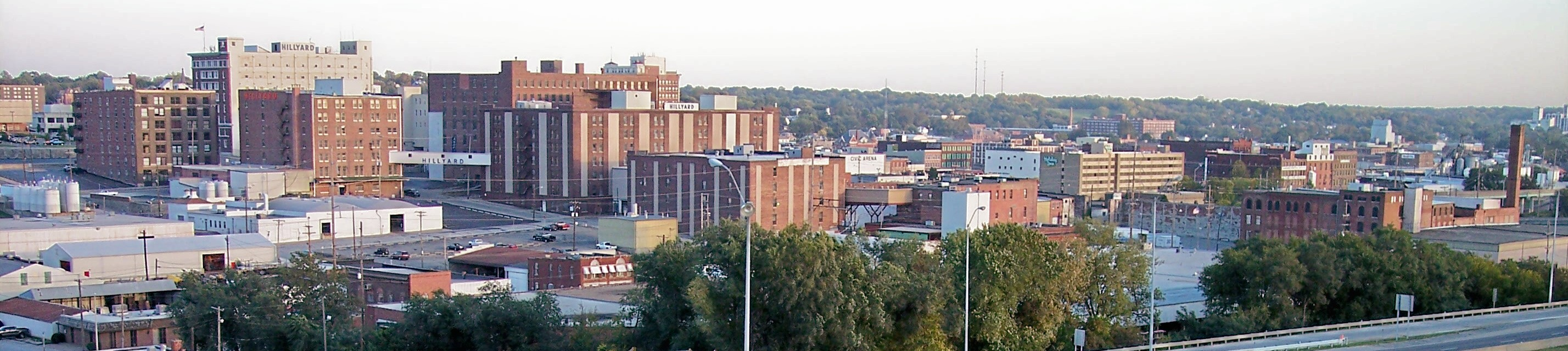
Downtown St. Joseph in 2006

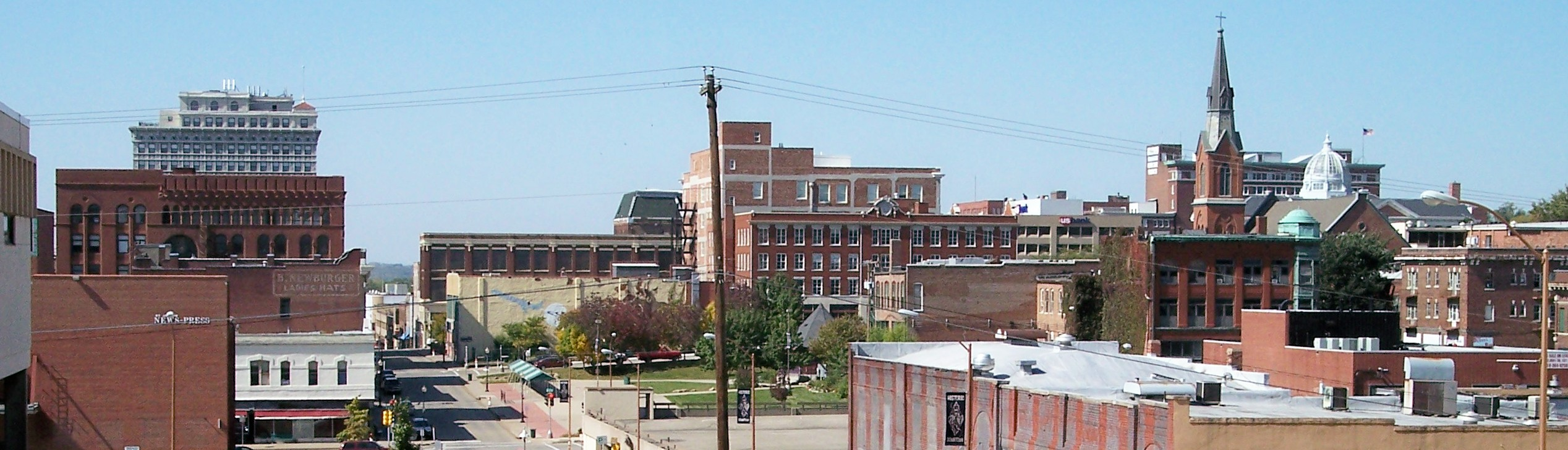
Another view of the downtown in 2006

Saint Joseph is located on the Missouri/Kansas border in northwestern Missouri, also close to Nebraska; Iowa is another 70 miles (110 km) farther north. The nearest major metropolitan area to St. Joseph is the Kansas City Metropolitan Area, which begins approximately 30 miles (48 km) to the south. The nearest major airport is Kansas City International Airport, which is approximately 35 miles (56 km) to the south. According to the United States Census Bureau, the city has a total area of 44.77 square miles (115.95 km^{2}), of which 43.99 square miles (113.93 km^{2}) is land and 0.78 square miles (2.02 km^{2}) is water.

Several water bodies and streams are located in St. Joseph besides the Missouri River. Roys Branch sources just northwest of Krug Park and travels southwest and enters the Missouri River next to Remington Nature Center. Whitehead Creek headwaters southeast of St. Joseph and flows northwest into the Missouri River just southwest of downtown. Corby Pond, a public lake in Corby Park, is a popular fishing location. Lake Contrary is located just southwest of St. Joseph and has a beach.

Under the Köppen climate classification, St. Joseph has a humid subtropical climate (Cfa) bordering on a humid continental climate (Dfa), although under United States isotherms of 32 °F (0 °C) the station is firmly continental. The monthly weather averages listed below are taken from National Weather Service 1981–2010 normals recorded at Rosecrans Airport. Because of the airport's location near the Missouri River and at a low elevation, official overnight lows during wintertime especially are often several degrees colder than at other places within the city. Snowfall is not recorded at the St. Joseph weather station although surrounding reporting stations typically receive 12 to 20 inches (0.30 to 0.51 meters) of snowfall annually.

Climate data for St Joseph, Missouri (Rosecrans Memorial Airport), 1991–2020 normals, extremes 1908–present
Month	Jan	Feb	Mar	Apr	May	Jun	Jul	Aug	Sep	Oct	Nov	Dec	Year
Record high °F (°C)	73 (23)	83 (28)	98 (37)	96 (36)	103 (39)	105 (41)	108 (42)	110 (43)	107 (42)	97 (36)	82 (28)	73 (23)	110 (43)
Mean maximum °F (°C)	61.7 (16.5)	65.1 (18.4)	79.7 (26.5)	86.9 (30.5)	91.9 (33.3)	95.0 (35.0)	97.4 (36.3)	96.9 (36.1)	92.7 (33.7)	87.5 (30.8)	74.0 (23.3)	63.8 (17.7)	99.0 (37.2)
Mean daily maximum °F (°C)	37.4 (3.0)	42.8 (6.0)	55.1 (12.8)	65.9 (18.8)	75.8 (24.3)	84.7 (29.3)	88.1 (31.2)	86.2 (30.1)	79.7 (26.5)	67.8 (19.9)	53.4 (11.9)	41.1 (5.1)	64.8 (18.2)
Daily mean °F (°C)	27.3 (−2.6)	32.0 (0.0)	43.3 (6.3)	53.8 (12.1)	64.8 (18.2)	74.2 (23.4)	77.7 (25.4)	75.3 (24.1)	67.0 (19.4)	55.3 (12.9)	42.0 (5.6)	31.1 (−0.5)	53.6 (12.0)
Mean daily minimum °F (°C)	17.1 (−8.3)	21.2 (−6.0)	31.5 (−0.3)	41.8 (5.4)	53.7 (12.1)	63.8 (17.7)	67.3 (19.6)	64.5 (18.1)	54.4 (12.4)	42.8 (6.0)	30.6 (−0.8)	21.1 (−6.1)	42.5 (5.8)
Mean minimum °F (°C)	−4.3 (−20.2)	2.5 (−16.4)	12.4 (−10.9)	25.0 (−3.9)	38.0 (3.3)	51.0 (10.6)	55.8 (13.2)	52.3 (11.3)	39.1 (3.9)	25.2 (−3.8)	14.4 (−9.8)	1.1 (−17.2)	−8.7 (−22.6)
Record low °F (°C)	−25 (−32)	−23 (−31)	−13 (−25)	2 (−17)	29 (−2)	41 (5)	41 (5)	41 (5)	30 (−1)	11 (−12)	−5 (−21)	−24 (−31)	−25 (−32)
Average precipitation inches (mm)	0.71 (18)	0.95 (24)	2.06 (52)	3.71 (94)	4.87 (124)	4.75 (121)	4.73 (120)	3.84 (98)	3.18 (81)	2.84 (72)	1.87 (47)	1.25 (32)	34.76 (883)
Average precipitation days (≥ 0.01 in)	4.7	5.6	7.7	10.6	12.3	11.8	9.3	9.4	8.4	8.3	5.6	5.6	99.3
Source: NOAA

== Demographics ==
Historical population
Census	Pop.	Note	%±
1860	8,932		—
1870	19,565		119.0%
1880	32,431		65.8%
1890	52,324		61.3%
1900	102,979		96.8%
1910	77,403		−24.8%
1920	77,939		0.7%
1930	80,935		3.8%
1940	75,711		−6.5%
1950	78,588		3.8%
1960	79,035		0.6%
1970	72,748		−8.0%
1980	76,691		5.4%
1990	71,852		−6.3%
2000	73,990		3.0%
2010	76,780		3.8%
2020	72,473		−5.6%
2025 (est.)	71,344		−1.6%
US decennial census

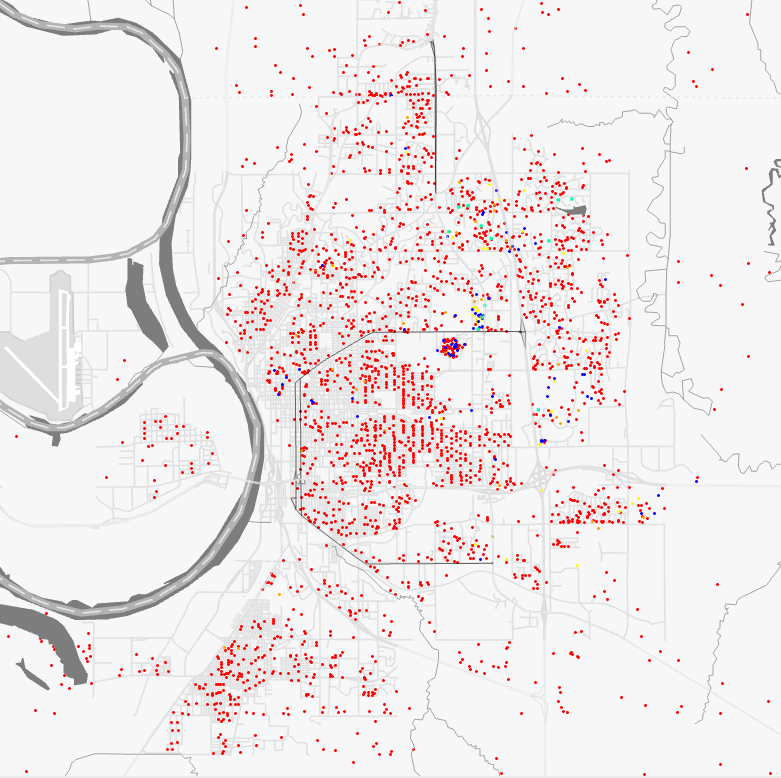
Map of racial distribution in St. Joseph, 2020 U.S. Census. Each dot is 25 people: Red = White, blue = Black, green = Asian, orange = Hispanic, and yellow = other.

=== 2020 census ===
As of the 2020 census, St. Joseph had a population of 72,473 and 29,051 households; there were 16,841 families. The population density was 1,645.6 per square mile (635.4/km^{2}). The median age was 38.0 years. 22.2% of residents were under the age of 18 and 17.1% of residents were 65 years of age or older. For every 100 females there were 99.9 males, and for every 100 females age 18 and over there were 97.8 males age 18 and over.

99.0% of residents lived in urban areas, while 1.0% lived in rural areas.

There were 29,051 households in St. Joseph, of which 28.2% had children under the age of 18 living in them. Of all households, 38.2% were married-couple households, 21.1% were households with a male householder and no spouse or partner present, and 31.1% were households with a female householder and no spouse or partner present. About 33.4% of all households were made up of individuals and 14.1% had someone living alone who was 65 years of age or older.

There were 33,028 housing units, of which 12.0% were vacant. The homeowner vacancy rate was 2.5% and the rental vacancy rate was 12.9%.

Racial composition as of the 2020 census
Race	Number	Percent
White	58,529	80.8%
Black or African American	4,367	6.0%
American Indian and Alaska Native	414	0.6%
Asian	1,039	1.4%
Native Hawaiian and Other Pacific Islander	437	0.6%
Some other race	1,905	2.6%
Two or more races	5,782	8.0%
Hispanic or Latino (of any race)	5,298	7.3%

=== 2016–2020 American Community Survey ===
The 2016–2020 5-year American Community Survey estimates show that the median household income was $48,716 (with a margin of error of +/- $2,421) and the median family income was $60,272 (+/- $2,679). Males had a median income of $34,486 (+/- $1,611) versus $25,623 (+/- $1,474) for females. The median income for those above 16 years old was $30,229 (+/- $1,494). Approximately, 12.0% of families and 16.9% of the population were below the poverty line, including 23.9% of those under the age of 18 and 7.9% of those ages 65 or over.

=== 2010 census ===
As of the census of 2010, there were 76,780 people, 29,727 households, and 18,492 families residing in the city. The population density was 1,745.4 inhabitants per square mile (673.9/km^{2}). There were 33,189 housing units at an average density of 754.5 per square mile (291.3/km^{2}). The racial makeup of the city was 87.8% White, 6.0% Black, 0.5% Native American, 0.9% Asian, 0.2% Pacific Islander, 2.0% from other races, and 2.7% from two or more races. Hispanic or Latino people of any race were 5.7% of the population.

There were 29,727 households, of which 32.0% had children under the age of 18 living with them, 42.0% were married couples living together, 14.5% had a female householder with no husband present, 5.7% had a male householder with no wife present, and 37.8% were non-families. 30.7% of all households were made up of individuals, and 12.2% had someone living alone who was 65 years of age or older. The average household size was 2.43 and the average family size was 3.01.

In the city, the population was spread out, with 23.6% under the age of 18; 11.7% between the ages of 18 and 24; 26.1% from 25 to 44; 24.9% from 45 to 64; and 13.8% who were 65 years of age or older. The median age in the city was 35.6 years. The gender makeup of the city was 49.8% male and 50.2% female.

=== 2000 census ===
As of the census of 2000, there were 73,990 people, 29,026 households, and 18,460 families residing in the city. The population density was 1,687.7 people per square mile (651.6 people/km^{2}). There were 31,752 housing units at an average density of 724.2 per square mile (279.6/km^{2}). The racial makeup of the city was 91.9% White, 5.0% Black, 0.5% Native American, 0.5% Asian, <0.1% Pacific Islander, 0.7% from other races, and 1.4% from two or more races. Hispanic or Latino of any race were 2.6% of the population.

There were 29,026 households, out of which 30.1% had children under the age of 18 living with them, 46.7% were married couples living together, 12.8% had a female householder with no husband present, and 36.4% were single-family households. 30.4% of all households were made up of individuals, and 13.2% had someone living alone who was 65 years of age or older. The average household size was 2.39 and the average family size was 2.98.

In the city, the population was spread out, with 24.1% under the age of 18, 11.6% from 18 to 24, 28.6% from 25 to 44, 20.3% from 45 to 64, and 15.4% who were 65 years of age or older. The median age was 36 years. For every 100 females, there were 95.6 males. For every 100 females age 18 and over, there were 92.7 males.

The median income for a household in the city was $32,663, and the median income for a family was $40,995. Males had a median income of $31,300 versus $21,592 for females. The per capita income for the city was $17,445. About 9.1% of families and 13.0% of the population were below the poverty line, including 15.5% of those under age 18 and 9.8% of those age 65 or over.

== Business ==
St. Joseph has a vibrant and diversified industrial economy making it the third largest exporter in Missouri. The industry includes major food processing, research, development, and production facilities of animal health products. Production of a wide range of heavy equipment, bio-fuels, meat and grains processing, candies, food processing equipment, metal can production, along with two major general contractors.

At the center of the so-called 'Kansas City Animal Health Corridor', which extends from Manhattan, Kansas, to Columbia, Missouri, St. Joseph is home to major animal health, pharmaceutical, nutrition research facilities. Including Boehringer Ingelheim and Nestle Purina.

Other agricultural products including herbicides for crop production and retail are produced in St. Joseph.

Herzog is based in St. Joseph. TransitAmerica Services, a subsidiary of Herzog, provides conductors and other railway technical positions for transit rail systems nationwide. Herzog Contracting, parent company to Transit America, is based in the city and provides construction services, rail equipment, rail testing, and signaling services to freight and transit systems throughout North America and the Caribbean.

St. Joseph has the third-largest manufacturing economy in Missouri, after St. Louis and Kansas City.

In June 2019, total employment in the St. Joseph Metropolitan Area was 65,099 persons.

Below is a partial list of largest employers in St. Joseph. Some privately held manufacturing companies are also top employers but they do not publicly disclose employment numbers.

Largest known employers in St. Joseph
Employer	Product or service	Number employed
Mosaic Life Care	Health care	2,922
Triumph Foods	Food processing	2,400
St. Joseph School District	Education	1,635
139th Airlift Wing, MO Air National Guard	Government	1,114
Boehringer Ingelheim Vetmedica, Inc.	Animal pharmaceuticals	1,070
Missouri American Water	Utilities	740
Tyson Foods	Food processing	670
City of Saint Joseph	Government	649
Western Reception, Diagnostic & Correctional Center	Government	576
Missouri Department of Transportation (MoDOT)	Government	490

=== Retail ===
St. Joseph is home to several retail areas, many of which are grouped along Belt Highway on the city's east side. East Hills Mall is located at North Belt Highway and Frederick Boulevard. Developed in 2005, the Shoppes at North Village is concentrated along North Belt Highway between approximately Cook and County Line roads. Other shopping districts include Belt Center, Hy-Vee Shopping Center, Hillcrest Plaza, East Ridge Village, and Woodlawn Shopping Center.

== Education ==
=== Public schools ===
The vast majority of the city limits is in the St. Joseph School District. The St. Joseph School District operates three public high schools, four public middle schools and 16 public elementary schools in St. Joseph. There are three private grade schools, a private high school and a private K–12 Christian school. Two new elementary schools (Oak Grove and Carden Park) have been constructed, and both opened by the 2014–15 academic year. In addition, there is an active home education community that serves the city and surrounding areas. In higher education, St. Joseph is the home of a regional public university as well as a public university outreach center, a public technical school and a private technical school.

Public elementary schools

- Carden Park Elementary School (K–06)
- Coleman Elementary School (K–06)
- Edison Elementary School (PK–06)
- Ellison Elementary School (K–06)
- Eugene Field Elementary School* (K–06)
- Hosea Elementary School (PK–06)
- Hyde Elementary School (K–06)
- Lindbergh Elementary School (PK–06)
- Oak Grove Elementary School (K–06)
- Parkway Elementary School (PK–06)
- Pershing Elementary School* (K–06)
- Pickett Elementary School (PK–06)
- Skaith Elementary School (PK–06)

Public middle schools

- Bode Middle School (07–08)
- Robidoux Middle School* (07–08)
- Spring Garden Middle School (07–08)
- Truman Middle School (07–08)

Public high schools

- Benton High School (09–12)
- Central High School (09–12)
- Lafayette High School* (09–12)

*Lafayette High School will be known as Lafayette Middle School at the beginning of the 2026–27 school year, Robidoux Middle School will be known as Robidoux Elementary School, and Pershing and Eugene Field Elementary schools will permanently close as a result of changes made by SJSD.

A small piece of the city is in the Mid-Buchanan County R-V School District.

=== Private schools ===
- Bishop LeBlond High School (9–12)
- Cathedral Grade School (preschool-8)
- Prescott Seventh-Day Adventist School (K-8)
- St. Francis Xavier Grade School (preschool–8)
- St. James Grade School (preschool-8)
- St. Joseph Christian School (preschool-12)
- St. Paul Lutheran School (preschool–8)

=== Colleges and universities ===
- Missouri Western State University

=== Special focus institutions ===
- American Business and Technology University
- Hillyard Technical Center
- Webster Learning Center

=== Library ===
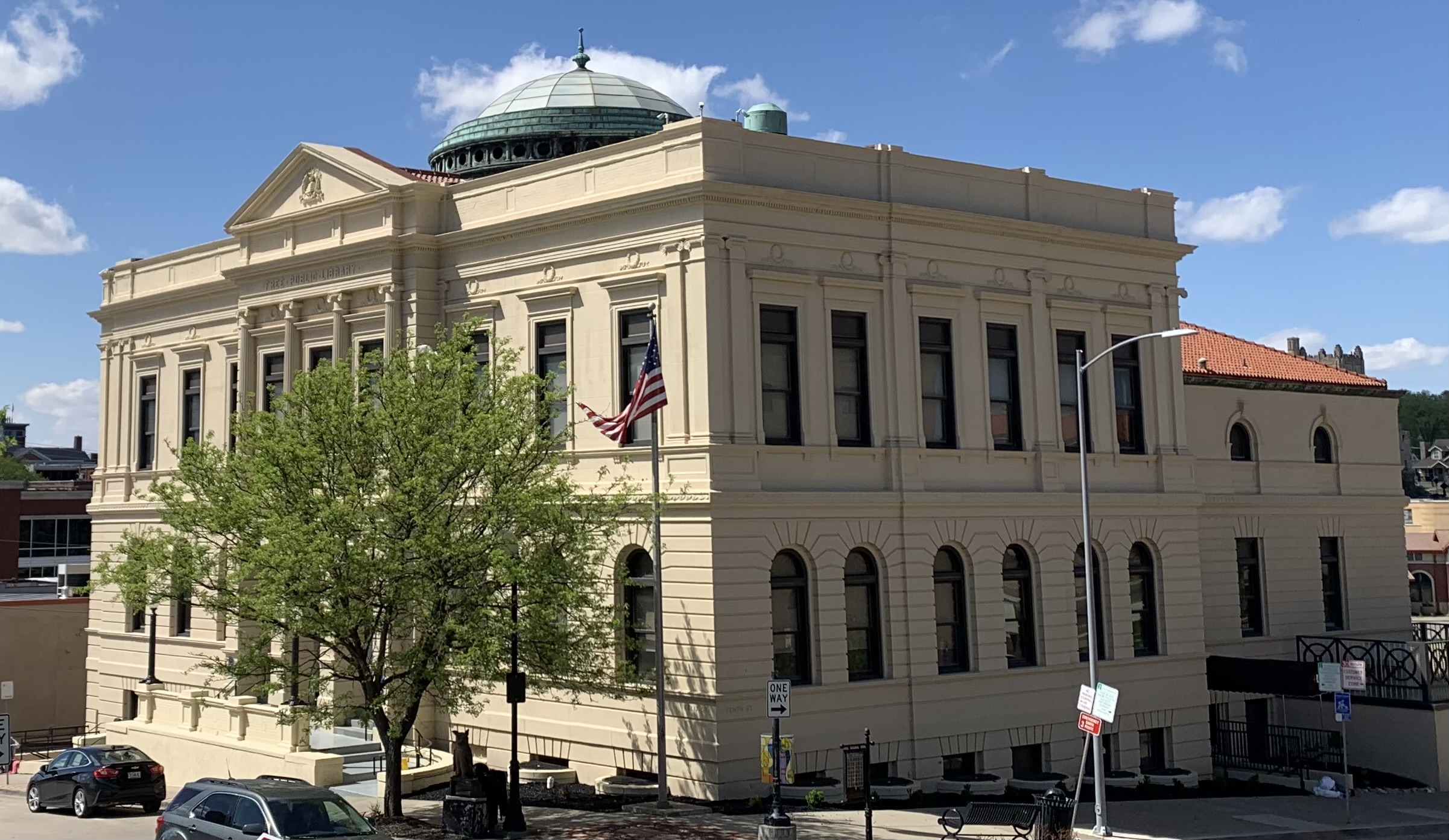
Free Public Library at St. Joseph, Missouri

St. Joseph has a four-branch public library system. The system is overseen by the Library Board, which consists of nine members appointed by the mayor, with city council approval, for three-year terms. The Downtown Library, located in downtown St. Joseph, houses the administrative offices for the library system. Carnegie Library and Washington Park Library are neighborhood branches that serve communities in the North and South ends of the city. East Hills Library is the largest branch, located off Interstate 29, which serves the greater St. Joseph area. Downtown Library and Carnegie Library were listed on the National Register of Historic Places in 1982 and 1990 respectively.

St. Joseph also has a branch of the Rolling Hills Consolidated Library. This library was founded in 1961 with its headquarters in the basement of the Washington Park Library. The library currently occupies over 23,000 square feet of space off of the Belt Highway. The space is used for the library itself, its administration offices, a used book store, and "The Upper Story", a large rentable meeting room.

== Transportation ==
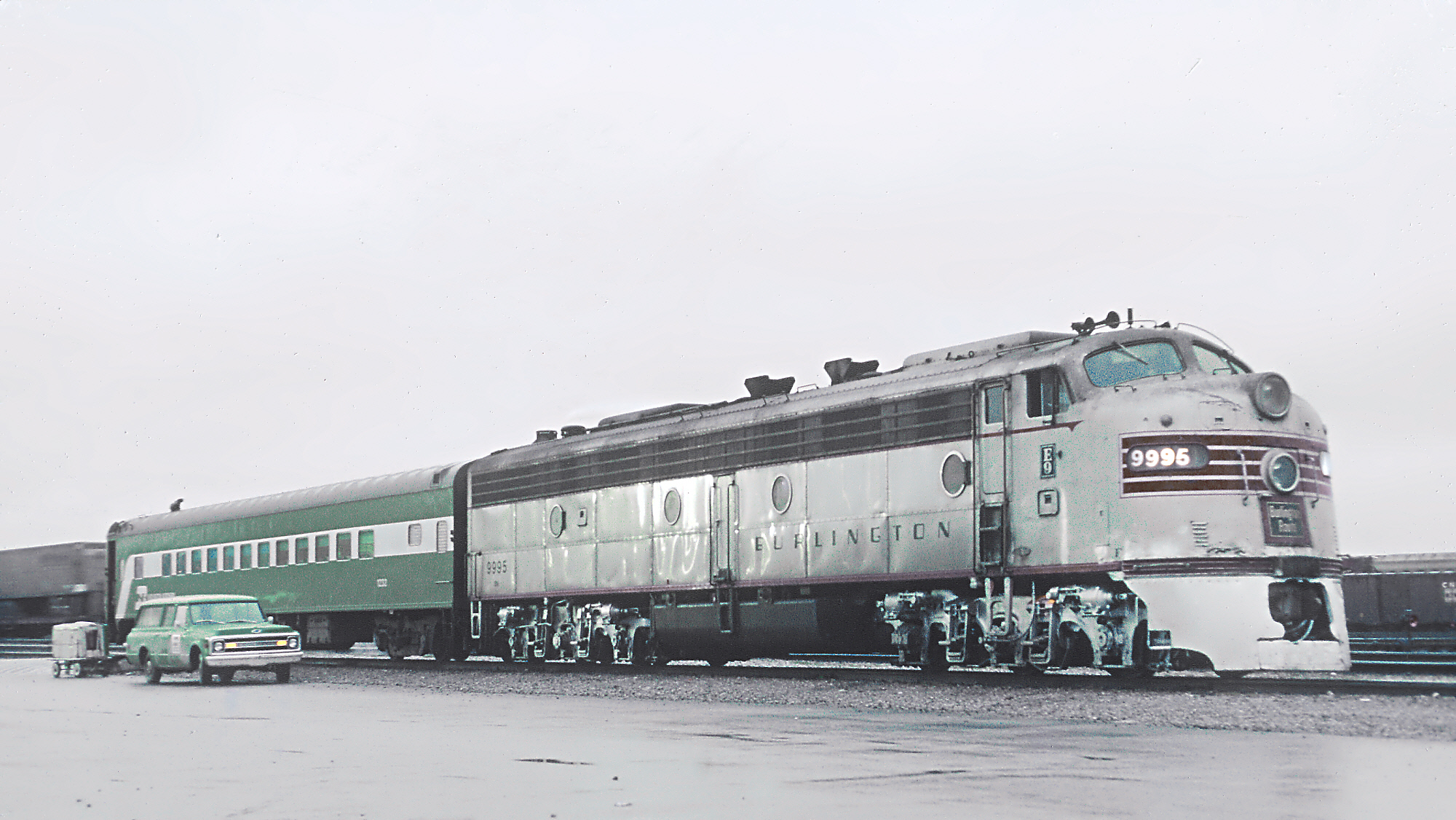
A Burlington Northern passenger train at St. Joseph in 1970

The St. Joseph Transit is publicly owned and provides bus service. Rosecrans Memorial Airport is a joint municipal/military owned airport for general aviation. It is the home of the 139th Airlift Wing of the Missouri Air National Guard, and does not have commercial service. The nearest commercial airport is Kansas City International Airport, which is approximately 35 miles (56 km) to the south. Intercity bus service to the city is provided by Jefferson Lines.

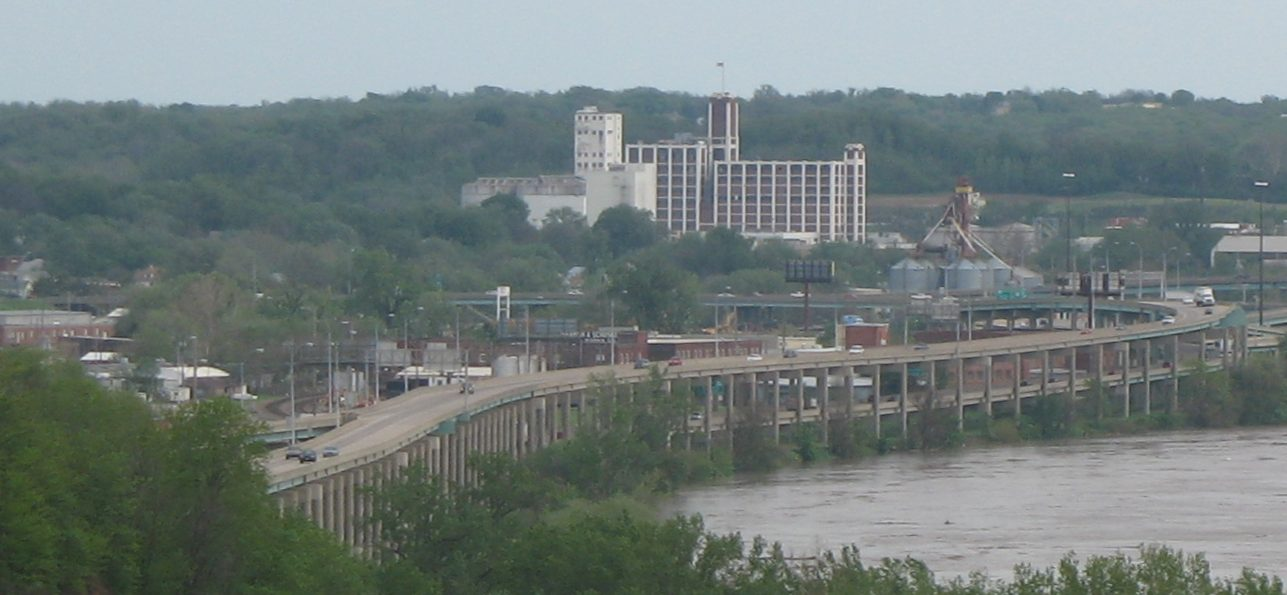
Looking south at the I-229 viaduct and the Missouri River from Wyeth Hill

The city is served by two Interstate highways, one proposed interstate, and four US Routes:

- I-29, which runs south to Kansas City and north to Council Bluffs, Iowa
- I-229, a western bypass of St. Joseph, which the portion through downtown will be demolished and be replaced with a surface boulevard.
- US 36, the Pony Express Highway, running east to Cameron and west to Hiawatha, Kansas
- US 59, which runs south to Atchison, Kansas, and north into western Iowa
- US 71, which runs south concurrent with I-29 to Kansas City, and north to Maryville
- US 169, which runs south to Kansas City, and north to Winterset, Iowa

In addition, four state routes serve the city:

- Route 6
- Route 371
- Route 752
- Route 759

== Cityscape ==
Numerous parks, golf courses, sports complexes, skate parks, a water park, a riverwalk along the Missouri River, and a small conservation area can be found throughout St. Joseph proper. The city is also nationally known for its 26-mile (42 km) parkway system, which is accompanied by an urban trail system. Two of the city's largest parks are Krug Park and Hyde Park; these respectively anchor the parkway and urban trail on the north and south. A dog park has been added to the parkway system near Corby Pond. There are many buildings that were built early on in the city's history, one of which being the Missouri Theater.

== Media ==
St. Joseph currently ranks 201st largest designated market area out of 210 media markets in the United States (as ranked by Nielsen Media Research); the market covers six counties in northwestern Missouri (Holt, Worth, Nodaway, Andrew, DeKalb and Buchanan) and Doniphan County in northeastern Kansas. The St. Joseph area has three low-power and two full-power television stations, and ten radio stations. News-Press & Gazette, a media corporation, is headquartered in Saint Joseph. They have interests in numerous television, radio, and newspaper markets throughout the midwestern and western United States.

=== Television ===
Due to its proximity to Kansas City, stations from that market serve as default affiliate of MyNetworkTV (KSMO-TV/Kansas City) and default member station of PBS (KCPT/Kansas City) due to the lack of stations of either network licensed to the market. ABC affiliate KQTV had long been the only major commercial station in St. Joseph, but in June 2012, the locally based News-Press & Gazette Company signed on KNPN-LD as a Fox affiliate, KBJO-LD as a CW+ affiliate, and KNPG-LD as a Telemundo affiliate. This in turn was followed by the conversions of KBJO-LD to NBC affiliate KNPG-LD in November 2016 (retaining the CW+ as a LD2 subchannel), and the original KNPG-LD (which assumed the KBJO-LD call letters) to CBS affiliate KCJO-LD in June 2017, ending out-of-market reliance for major network programming.

==== Local broadcast stations ====
St. Joseph broadcast television stations
Channel	Callsign	Network	Subchannels		Owner
(Virtual/RF)	Callsign	Network	Channel	Programming	Owner
2.1 (7)	KQTV	ABC	—N/a	—N/a	Heartland Media
16.1 (21)	KTAJ-TV	TBN	16.2; 16.3; 16.4; 16.5	The Church Channel; JCTV; TBN Enlace USA; Smile of a Child Network	Trinity Broadcasting Network
21.1 (9)	KNPG-LD	NBC	21.2; 21.3; 21.4; 21.5	CW+ Telemundo; Bounce TV; Grit	News-Press & Gazette Company
26.1 (15)	KNPN-LD	Fox	26.2; 26.3; 26.4; 26.5	CBS; News-Press 3 NOW; Escape; Laff	News-Press & Gazette Company
30.1 (28)	KCJO-LD	CBS	—N/a	—N/a	News-Press & Gazette Company

==== Local independent cable channels ====
- News-Press 3 NOW, Suddenlink channel 3/KNPN-LD virtual channel 26.3 (local news)

=== Radio ===
St. Joseph broadcast radio stations
Band	Frequency	Callsign	Nickname	Format	Owner
AM stations	680	KFEQ	680 KFEQ	News/talk/sports	Eagle Communications
AM stations	1270	KYSJ	KY 102	Classic rock	Eagle Communications, Inc.
AM stations	1550	KESJ	Joe Town 107.5	Classic hits	Eagle Communications
FM stations	89.7	KJCV	Bott Radio Network	Religious	Community Broadcasting, Inc.
FM stations	91.1	KSJI	Life 88.5 (KJNW)	Contemporary Christian	Northwestern Media
FM stations	91.9	KSRD	Air1	Contemporary Christian	Educational Media Foundation
FM stations	92.7	KSJQ	Q-Country 92.7	Country music	Eagle Communications
FM stations	95.3	K237HF	680 KFEQ (KFEQ)	News/talk/sports	Eagle Communications
FM stations	96.1	WRJE-LP	Radio Joe	Educational/Adult hits	Radio Joe, Inc.
FM stations	98.5	K253BG	K-Love (KLRX)	Contemporary Christian	Educational Media Foundation
FM stations	99.3	KFOH-LP	SJMF Radio	All genres	St. Joseph Music Foundation
FM stations	102.5	K273BF	KY 102 (KYSJ)	Classic rock	Eagle Communications
FM stations	105.5	KKJO	K-JO 105-5	Hot adult contemporary	Eagle Communications
FM stations	106.7	K294BE	Catholic Radio Network (KEXS)	Catholic religious	Catholic Radio Network
FM stations	107.5	K298DA	Joe Town 107.5 (KESJ)	Classic hits	Eagle Communications

=== Newspapers ===
- The Regular Joe
- St. Joseph News-Press
- The Saint Joseph Telegraph

== See also ==
- List of cities in Missouri
- St. Joseph Cardinals
