= St. Joseph News-Press =

Daily newspaper based in St. Joseph, Missouri

- Type: Daily newspaper
- Format: Broadsheet
- Owner: News-Press & Gazette Company
- News editor: Steve Booher
- Founded: 1845 (St. Joseph Gazette); 1903 (St. Joseph News-Press; as the St. Joseph Post)
- Headquarters: 825 Edmond Street, St. Joseph, Missouri 64501 USA
- Circulation: 26,015 (daily); 29,327 (Sunday)
- ISSN: 1063-4312
- OCLC number: 70220365
- Website: newspressnow.com

The St. Joseph News-Press is a daily morning newspaper based in St. Joseph, Missouri. It is the flagship publication of the News-Press & Gazette Company, which owns newspapers across northwestern Missouri and northeastern Kansas, and television and radio stations throughout the western United States.

== History ==
It traces its roots to the St. Joseph Gazette, which was founded in 1845 shortly after St. Joseph was founded. The Gazette was the only newspaper to be sent west on the first ride of the Pony Express. The Evening News began publication on May 3, 1879 by J.W. and G.J. Spencer with a note that it would be "devoted to gab, gossip and paid locals." It claimed no political stance (in contrast to the Democratic Gazette). By 1883, it claimed "a larger circulations than the Daily and Weekly papers in St. Joseph combined."

In 1889, it was acquired by Charles M. Palmer, a cohort of William Randolph Hearst. Palmer was a broker for Hearst for many newspapers but would keep the Press.

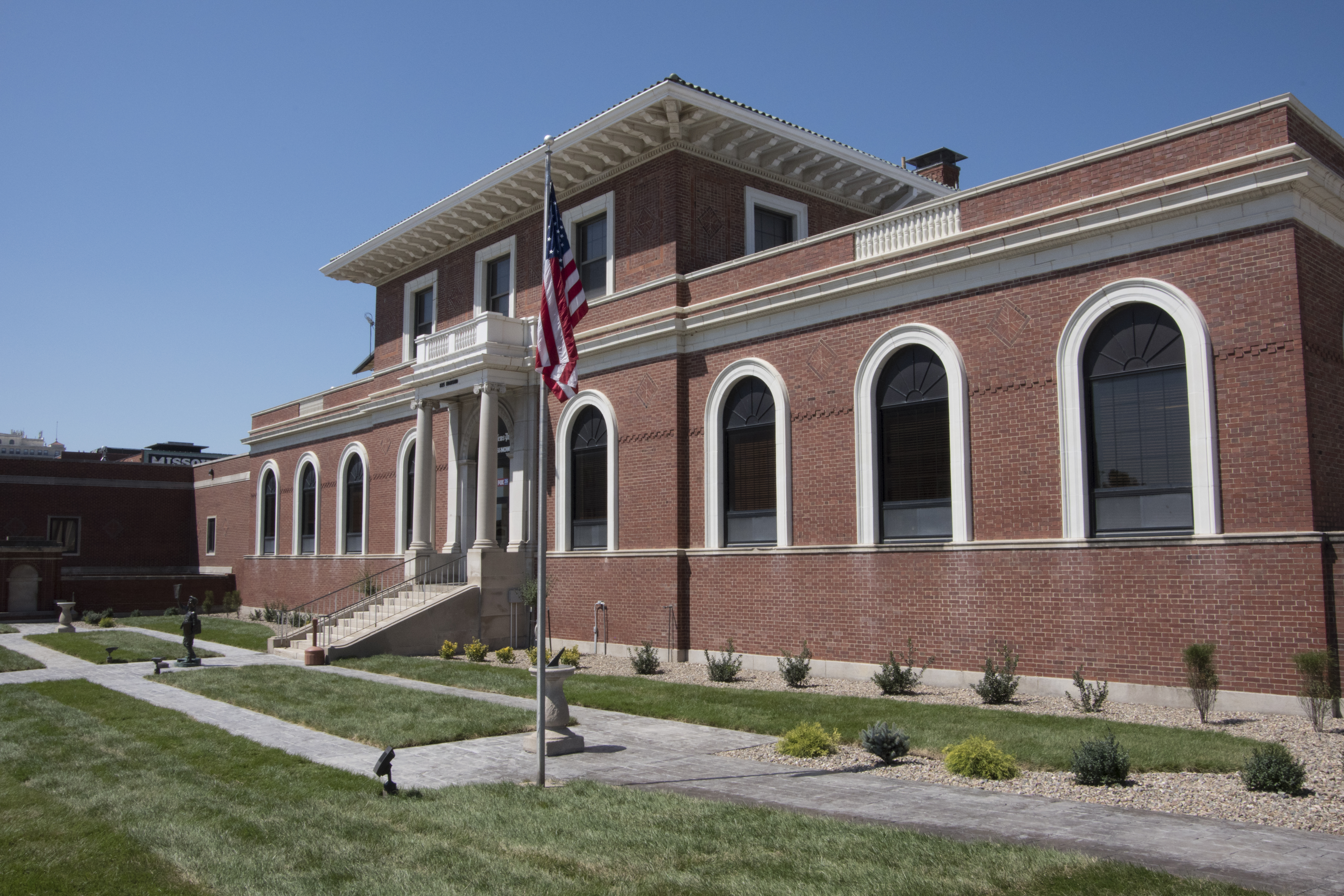
News-Press headquarters in St. Joseph

One of its most colorful editors was Christian Rutt. Rutt was said to have originated the concept of Aunt Jemima pancake mix. Rutt sold the idea to the Davis Milling Company in St. Joseph which marketed it at the World's Columbian Exposition in 1893.

In 1903, The St. Joseph Post started publication and was quickly purchased by Palmer and was renamed the St. Joseph News and Press. In 1913, it moved into its headquarters at Edmond and Seventh Streets, where it remains today.

Palmer eventually bought the Gazette. In 1939, he brought Henry D. Bradley to run day-to-day operations. After Palmer died, Bradley would buy the papers in 1951. It remains in the Bradley family. On June 30, 1988, the Bradleys ceased publication of the Gazette and switched the News-Press to a morning newspaper.

== Converged newsroom ==
The St. Joseph News-Press is part of a converged newsroom publishing content in partnership with their co-owned television stations, Fox affiliate KNPN-LD, NBC affiliate KNPG-LD and CBS affiliate KCJO-LD. This combined news effort is known as News-Press NOW. These media properties share the website newspressnow.com.
