= Channel 35 =

Channel 35 refers to several television stations:

- Kanal 35, a defunct Azerbaijani regional television station

== Canada ==
The following television stations operate on virtual channel 35 in Canada:

- CFJP-DT in Montreal, Quebec
- CHCJ-DT in Hamilton, Ontario
- CIIT-DT in Winnipeg, Manitoba
- CIVK-DT-3 in Gaspé, Quebec

== Mexico ==
One television station operates on virtual channel 35 in Mexico:

- XHUJAT-TDT in Villahermosa, Tabasco

== See also ==
- Channel 35 virtual TV stations in the United States

For UHF frequencies covering 596-602 MHz:

- Channel 35 TV stations in Canada
- Channel 35 TV stations in Mexico
- Channel 35 digital TV stations in the United States
- Channel 35 low-power TV stations in the United States
