= Channel 35 digital TV stations in the United States =

The following television stations broadcast on digital channel 35 in the United States:

- K35AX-D in Hawthorne, Nevada
- K35BW-D in Lewiston, Idaho
- K35CH-D in Cortez/Mancos, etc., Colorado
- K35CK-D in Price, Utah
- K35CR-D in Tillamook, etc., Oregon, on virtual channel 12, which rebroadcasts K18EL-D
- K35CV-D in Shoshoni, Wyoming
- K35EE-D in Moccasin, Arizona, on virtual channel 15, which rebroadcasts KNXV-TV
- K35EI-D in Dolan Springs, Arizona
- K35EM-D in Quitaque, Texas
- K35EW-D in Heber/Midway, Utah, on virtual channel 2, which rebroadcasts KUTV
- K35FI-D in Akron, Colorado, on virtual channel 6, which rebroadcasts K16NJ-D
- K35FL-D in Silver Springs, Nevada
- K35FO-D in Milton-Freewater, Oregon
- K35FP in Tucumcari, New Mexico
- K35FS-D in Santa Clara, etc., Utah, on virtual channel 5, which rebroadcasts KSL-TV
- K35GA-D in La Grande, Oregon
- K35GD-D in Golconda, Nevada
- K35GG-D in Huntsville, etc., Utah, on virtual channel 7, which rebroadcasts KUED
- K35GJ-D in Preston, Idaho, on virtual channel 7, which rebroadcasts KUED
- K35GO-D in Haxtun, Colorado, on virtual channel 4, which rebroadcasts KCNC-TV
- K35GR-D in Badger, South Dakota
- K35GU-D in Ruidoso, New Mexico
- K35HB-D in Deming, New Mexico
- K35HD-D in Soda Springs, Idaho
- K35HU-D in Grays River, Washington, on virtual channel 8, which rebroadcasts KGW
- K35HW-D in Florence, Oregon
- K35IC-D in Bonners Ferry, Idaho
- K35II-D in South Point, Hawaii
- K35IJ-D in Hanna & Tabiona, Utah
- K35IK-D in Duchesne, Utah, on virtual channel 11, which rebroadcasts KBYU-TV
- K35IQ-D in Vernal, etc., Utah, on virtual channel 13, which rebroadcasts KSTU
- K35IR-D in Garrison, etc., Utah
- K35IS-D in Peoa/Oakley, Utah
- K35IU-D in Frost, Minnesota
- K35IX-D in Basalt, Colorado
- K35IZ-D in Jackson, Minnesota
- K35JH-D in London Springs, Oregon
- K35JI-D in Orangeville, Utah
- K35JJ-D in Scofield, Utah
- K35JK-D in Fountain Green, Utah
- K35JN-D in Duluth, Minnesota
- K35JR-D in Arrey & Derry, New Mexico
- K35JS-D in Lamar, Colorado
- K35JT-D in Drummond, Montana
- K35JW-D in Bridger, etc., Montana
- K35JX-D in Westwood, California
- K35JY-D in Lamont, Oklahoma
- K35JZ-D in Alton, Utah
- K35KC-D in Great Falls, Montana
- K35KE-D in Hollis, Oklahoma
- K35KH-D in Walker, Minnesota, on virtual channel 35, which rebroadcasts WUCW and KSAX
- K35KI-D in St. James, Minnesota
- K35KL-D in Manila, etc., Utah
- K35KM-D in Eureka, Nevada
- K35KX-D in Topeka, Kansas
- K35LA-D in Palm Springs, California
- K35LD-D in Prineville, Oregon
- K35LF-D in Eureka, California
- K35LJ-D in Crested Butte, Colorado, on virtual channel 4, which rebroadcasts K04DH-D
- K35MF-D in Big Spring, Texas
- K35MJ-D in Grangeville, Idaho
- K35MN-D in Omak, etc., Washington
- K35MQ-D in Weatherford, Oklahoma
- K35MS-D in Canyonville, etc., Oregon
- K35MT-D in Port Orford, Oregon
- K35MU-D in Cottonwood, etc., Arizona, on virtual channel 8, which rebroadcasts KAET
- K35MV-D in Concho, Oklahoma
- K35MW-D in Lead, South Dakota
- K35MX-D in Kingman, Arizona
- K35MY-D in Birchdale, Minnesota
- K35MZ-D in Las Animas, Colorado
- K35NB-D in Polson, Montana
- K35NC-D in Hanksville, Utah
- K35ND-D in Rural Garfield, etc., Utah
- K35NE-D in Fremont, Utah
- K35NF-D in Fort Peck, Montana
- K35NG-D in Escalante, Utah
- K35NJ-D in Antimony, Utah
- K35NK-D in Cannonville, Utah
- K35NL-D in Boulder, Utah
- K35NM-D in Caineville, Utah
- K35NN-D in Randolph & Woodruff, Utah
- K35NO-D in Blanding/Monticello, Utah
- K35NP-D in Kanarraville, New Harmony, Utah
- K35NQ-D in Mesa, Colorado
- K35NR-D in Willmar, Minnesota
- K35NS-D in Montrose, Colorado
- K35NT-D in Parowan/Enoch/Para, Utah
- K35NU-D in Delta, Oak City, etc., Utah
- K35NV-D in Beryl/Newcastle/Modena, Utah
- K35NW-D in Beaver etc., Utah
- K35NX-D in Fillmore, etc., Utah
- K35NY-D in Redwood Falls, Minnesota
- K35NZ-D in Ninilchick, Alaska
- K35OA-D in Emery, Utah
- K35OB-D in Green River, Utah
- K35OC-D in Ferron, Utah
- K35OD-D in Clear Creek, Utah
- K35OF-D in Joplin, Montana
- K35OH-D in Roseburg, Oregon
- K35OI-D in Starr Valley, Nevada
- K35OK-D in Julesburg, Colorado, on virtual channel 47, which rebroadcasts K21NZ-D
- K35OL-D in Yuma, Colorado, on virtual channel 4, which rebroadcasts KCNC-TV
- K35OM-D in La Veta, Colorado
- K35ON-D in Paonia, Colorado
- K35OO-D in Del Norte, Colorado
- K35OP-D in Park City, Utah, on virtual channel 13, which rebroadcasts KSTU
- K35OQ-D in San Luis, Colorado
- K35OR-D in Aguilar, Colorado
- K35OT-D in International Falls, Minnesota
- K35OU-D in Tucson, Arizona
- K35OY-D in Columbia, Missouri
- K35OZ-D in Chico, California
- K35PE-D in Snowmass Village, Colorado
- K35PJ-D in Santa Barbara, California
- K35PK-D in Monterey, California
- K35PL-D in Roundup, Montana
- K35PO-D in Bismarck, North Dakota
- KABE-CD in Bakersfield, California
- KALB-TV in Alexandria, Louisiana
- KATH-LD in Juneau-Douglas, Alaska
- KAXW-LD in Mullin, Texas
- KAXX-LD in San Antonio, Texas
- KAZH-LD in McAllen, Texas
- KCEB in Longview, Texas, uses KPKN-LD's spectrum
- KCFT-CD in Anchorage, Alaska
- KCNC-TV in Denver, Colorado, on virtual channel 4
- KCRA-TV in Sacramento, California, on virtual channel 3
- KDFW in Dallas, Texas, on virtual channel 4
- KDHW-CD in Yakima, Washington
- KESE-LD in Yuma, Arizona
- KEXI-LD in Kalispell, Montana
- KFGX-LD in Fargo, North Dakota
- KFLU-LD in Fayetteville, Arkansas
- KFPH-CD in Phoenix, Arizona, an ATSC 3.0 station, on virtual channel 35
- KGLA-DT in Hammond, Louisiana
- KGLR-LD in Sparks, Nevada
- KGO-TV (DRT) in San Jose, California, on virtual channel 7
- KHBA-LD in Spokane, Washington
- KHIN in Red Oak, Iowa
- KHNL in Honolulu, Hawaii
- KHPF-CD in Fredericksburg, Texas
- KJBO-LD in Wichita Falls, Texas
- KJBW-LD in Paragould, Arkansas
- KJTV-TV in Lubbock, Texas
- KMTW in Hutchinson, Kansas
- KNME-TV in Albuquerque, New Mexico
- KNTL-LD in Laughlin, Nevada
- KORK-CD in Portland, Oregon, on virtual channel 35
- KOZJ in Joplin, Missouri
- KPBI-CD in Bentonville, Arkansas
- KPKN-LD in Tyler, Texas
- KPRC-TV in Houston, Texas, on virtual channel 2
- KQAF-LD in La Junta, Colorado
- KQAH-LD in Maltby, Washington, on virtual channel 10
- KQML-LD in Kansas City, Missouri, on virtual channel 46
- KRAH-CD in Paris, Arkansas
- KRIN in Waterloo, Iowa
- KSDK in St. Louis, Missouri, on virtual channel 5
- KSTP-TV in St. Paul, Minnesota, on virtual channel 5
- KTLA in Los Angeles, California, on virtual channel 5
- KTSB-CD in Santa Maria, California
- KTXC-LD in Amarillo, Texas
- KUCW in Ogden, Utah, on virtual channel 30
- KUOK in Woodward, Oklahoma
- KVAT-LD in Austin, Texas
- KVSD-LD in San Diego, California
- KVTE-LD in Las Vegas, Nevada
- KXPI-LD in Pocatello, Idaho
- KXSH-LD in Rochester, Minnesota
- KXZQ-LD in Durango, Colorado
- KZAK-LD in Boise, Idaho
- KZMM-CD in Fresno, California
- W35BB-D in Dublin, Georgia
- W35CK-D in Highlands, North Carolina
- W35CO-D in Burnsville, North Carolina
- W35CS-D in Ocean City, Maryland
- W35DH-D in Greenville, Florida
- W35DI-D in Roanoke, West Virginia
- W35DQ-D in Midland, Michigan
- W35DT-D in Beaver Dam, North Carolina
- W35DV-D in Augusta, Georgia
- W35DW-D in Greenville, North Carolina
- W35DY-D in Sterling-Dixon, Illinois
- W35DZ-D in Algood, Tennessee
- W35EC-D in Lake City, Florida
- W35ED-D in Florence, South Carolina
- W35EE-D in Demopolis, Alabama
- WBBJ-TV in Jackson, Tennessee
- WBND-LD in South Bend, Indiana
- WCCV-TV in Arecibo, Puerto Rico, on virtual channel 54
- WCTZ-LD in Bowling Green, Kentucky, on virtual channel 35
- WCYB-TV in Bristol, Virginia
- WDES-CD in Miramar Beach, Florida
- WDTA-LD in Atlanta, Georgia, on virtual channel 35
- WEAC-CD in Jacksonville, Alabama
- WECP-LD in Panama City, Florida
- WENY-TV in Elmira, New York
- WFLX in West Palm Beach, Florida
- WFMY-TV in Greensboro, North Carolina
- WFPA-CD in Philadelphia, Pennsylvania, on virtual channel 28
- WFTV in Orlando, Florida, on virtual channel 9
- WGBO-DT in Joliet, Illinois, on virtual channel 66
- WHCT-LD in Hartford, New Haven, Connecticut, on virtual channel 35
- WHDH in Boston, Massachusetts, on virtual channel 7
- WHVD-LD in Huntsville, Alabama
- WJAC-TV in Johnstown, Pennsylvania
- WJDW-LD in Tazewell, Virginia
- WJTC in Pensacola, Florida, an ATSC 3.0 station.
- WKLE in Lexington, Kentucky
- WLTZ in Columbus, Georgia
- WLUC-TV in Marquette, Michigan
- WLVI in Cambridge, Massachusetts, uses WHDH's spectrum, on virtual channel 56
- WMYA-TV in Anderson, South Carolina
- WNBC in New York, New York, uses WNJU's spectrum, on virtual channel 4
- WNHO-LD in Defiance, Ohio
- WNJU in Linden, New Jersey, on virtual channel 47
- WNKY-LD in Bowling Green, Kentucky
- WNYF-CD in Watertown, New York
- WOLP-CD in Grand Rapids, Michigan, an ATSC 3.0 station
- WOTM-LD in Birmingham, Alabama
- WPBN-TV in Traverse City, Michigan
- WPBY-LD in Lafayette, Indiana, on virtual channel 35
- WPDR-LD in Tomah, Wisconsin
- WPTD in Dayton, Ohio
- WPXW-TV in Manassas, Virginia, on virtual channel 66
- WRCZ-LD in Ocala, Florida
- WRGB in Pittsfield, Massachusetts
- WSCG in Baxley, Georgia
- WTAM-LD in Tampa, Florida, on virtual channel 30
- WTAP-TV in Parkersburg, West Virginia
- WTMV-LD in Ogden, North Carolina
- WTVP in Peoria, Illinois
- WTWO in Terre Haute, Indiana
- WUDL-LD in Detroit, Michigan, on virtual channel 19
- WUVG-DT (DRT) in Athens, Georgia, on virtual channel 34
- WVIR-CD in Charlottesville, Virginia
- WVIZ in Cleveland, Ohio, on virtual channel 25
- WWLF-LD in Syracuse, New York
- WZCH-LD in Myrtle Beach, South Carolina

The following stations, which are no longer licensed, formerly broadcast on digital channel 35:

- K35CE-D in Canadian, Texas
- K35DG-D in La Jolla, California
- K35DK-D in Granite Falls, Minnesota
- K35NI-D in Three Forks, Montana
- KEGG-LD in Tulsa, Oklahoma
- KIDB-LD in Sweetwater, Texas
- WCTX-CD in Virginia Beach, Virginia
- WFCU-LD in Augusta, Georgia
- WSWH-LD in Decatur, Alabama
- WTMQ-LD in Jacksonville, North Carolina
- WUCV-LD in Florence, South Carolina
