= NBC 11 =

NBC 11 may refer to one of the following television stations in the United States:

== Current affiliates ==
- KCBD in Lubbock, Texas
- KGIN-DT2 in Grand Island, Nebraska
- KKCO in Grand Junction, Colorado
- KNTV in San Jose, California (O&O)
- KRII in Chisholm, Minnesota
  - Semi-satellite of KBJR-TV in Superior, Wisconsin / Duluth, Minnesota
- KRXI-DT2, a digital subchannel of KRXI-TV in Reno, Nevada
- KSNG in Garden City, Kansas
  - Semi-satellite of KSNW in Wichita, Kansas
- KVLY-TV in Fargo, North Dakota
- KYMA-DT in Yuma, Arizona / El Centro, California
- WBAL-TV in Baltimore, Maryland
- WBKB-DT2, a digital subchannel of WBKB-TV in Alpena, Michigan
- WXIA-TV in Atlanta, Georgia
- WPXI in Pittsburgh, Pennsylvania
- KARE in Minneapolis - St. Paul, Minnesota

== Formerly affiliated ==
- KHAW-TV in Hilo, Hawaii (1961–1996)
- KYMA in Yuma, Arizona (1991–2020)
- VSB-TV in Hamilton, Bermuda (1991–2014)
- WLUK-TV in Green Bay, Wisconsin (1954–1959 and 1983–1995)
