= Channel 13 virtual TV stations in the United States =

The following television stations operate on virtual channel 13 in the United States:

- K02QW-D in Reno, Nevada
- K03DT-D in Superior, Montana
- K03FW-D in Kenai, etc., Alaska
- K04GW-D in Spearfish, South Dakota
- K04HF-D in Panaca, Nevada
- K04RW-D in Cedar Canyon, Utah
- K05AH-D in Hot Springs, Montana
- K05ML-D in Sula, Montana
- K06JC-D in Chadron, Nebraska
- K06KR-D in Crawford, Nebraska
- K07XM-D in Mink Creek, Idaho
- K07ZG-D in Powderhorn Valley, Colorado
- K08KW-D in Richland, Oregon
- K08LN-D in Harrison, Nebraska
- K09DY-D in Westcliffe, Colorado
- K09EP-D in Grants, etc., New Mexico
- K10NF-D in Halfway, Oregon
- K10PN-D in Cedar City, etc., Utah
- K11FQ-D in Thompson Falls, Montana
- K11IV-D in Pioche, Nevada
- K11JP-D in Plains-Paradise, Montana
- K11TY-D in Salmon, Idaho
- K12QT-D in Trout Creek, etc., Montana
- K12WZ-D in Long Valley Junction, Utah
- K12XI-D in Helper, Utah
- K13AV-D in Gunnison, Colorado
- K13LU-D in Ursine, Nevada
- K13LV-D in Caliente, Nevada
- K13OG-D in Rural Juab, etc., Utah
- K13RN-D in Old Harbor, Alaska
- K13RR-D in Tok, Alaska
- K13SA-D in Port Heiden, Alaska
- K13SE-D in Stony River, Alaska
- K13SM-D in Slana, Alaska
- K13SV-D in Pedro Bay, Alaska
- K13SY-D in Birch Creek, Alaska
- K13TD-D in White Mountain, Alaska
- K13TE-D in Bettles, Alaska
- K13TJ-D in Mountain Village, Alaska
- K13TN-D in Manley Hot Springs, Alaska
- K13TR-D in Homer, Alaska
- K13UO-D in Cold Bay, Alaska
- K13UV-D in Napakiak, Alaska
- K13AAH-D in Salina & Redmond, Utah
- K13AAI-D in Marysvale, Utah
- K13AAJ-D in Woodland & Kamas, Utah
- K13AAL-D in Beaver etc., Utah
- K13AAN-D in Roosevelt, Utah
- K13AAP-D in East Price, Utah
- K13AAX-D in Redding, California
- K14BF-D in Wenatchee, Washington
- K14IC-D in Burley, Idaho
- K14IU-D in Frenchtown, etc., Montana
- K14PA-D in Rural Juab County, Utah
- K14QX-D in Hatch, Utah
- K15CD-D in Mayfield, Utah
- K15FQ-D in Milford, etc., Utah
- K15HN-D in Bluff & area, Utah
- K15LK-D in Scipio, Utah
- K15LL-D in Leamington, Utah
- K15LZ-D in Tucumcari, New Mexico
- K15MF-D in Raton, etc., New Mexico
- K16BT-D in Orderville, Utah
- K16DR-D in Jack's Cabin, Colorado
- K16GJ-D in Polson, Montana
- K16JD-D in Northome, Minnesota
- K16KO-D in Leadore, Idaho
- K16MN-D in Wendover, Utah
- K16MW-D in Malad City, Idaho
- K17IG-D in Hoehne, Colorado
- K17JZ-D in Bondurant, Wyoming
- K17NX-D in Centralia/Chehalis, Washington
- K18HZ-D in Navajo Mountain, Utah
- K18IA-D in Oljeto, Utah
- K18IB-D in Mexican Hat, Utah
- K18LL-D in Eads, etc., Colorado
- K18MI-D in Circleville, etc., Utah
- K18MY-D in East Carbon County, Utah
- K19CG-D in Belle Fourche, South Dakota
- K19HU-D in Montezuma Creek & Aneth, Utah
- K19MH-D in Fruitland, Nevada
- K19MN-D in Lake George, Colorado
- K19MP-D in Gallup, New Mexico
- K20IV-D in Baker City, etc., Oregon
- K20JG-D in Salida, etc., Colorado
- K20MS-D in Richfield, etc., Utah
- K20MU-D in Bicknell, etc., Utah
- K20MV-D in Koosharem, Utah
- K20MW-D in Rural Sevier County, Utah
- K20MX-D in Panguitch, etc., Utah
- K20MY-D in Henriville, Utah
- K20NW-D in Laughlin, Nevada
- K21FD-D in Taos, etc., New Mexico
- K21JV-D in Green River, Utah
- K21LY-D in Mapleton, Oregon
- K21MB-D in Scottsburg, Oregon
- K21MX-D in Garfield, etc., Utah
- K21NP-D in Orangeville, Utah
- K22EW-D in Mora, New Mexico
- K22GE-D in Dulce, New Mexico
- K22MS-D in Eagles Nest, New Mexico
- K22NA-D in Inyokern, etc., California
- K22NE-D in Myton, Utah
- K22OO-D in Nephi, Utah
- K23KZ-D in Bigfork/Marcell, Minnesota
- K23NI-D in Crescent City, California
- K23NR-D in Mount Pleasant, Utah
- K24MF-D in Florence, Oregon
- K24MM-D in Red Lake, Minnesota
- K24MT-D in International Falls, Minnesota
- K24NM-D in Sargents, Colorado
- K25CG-D in Aberdeen, Washington
- K25GY-D in Beryl/Modena/New Castle, Utah
- K25HJ-D in Hornsby Ranch, etc., New Mexico
- K25HV-D in Truth or Consequence, New Mexico
- K25JJ-D in Fillmore/Meadow, etc., Utah
- K25LF-D in Philipsburg, Montana
- K25OI-D in Soda Springs, Idaho
- K25OO-D in Pendleton, Oregon
- K25OS-D in Thompson Falls, Montana
- K25OU-D in Brookings, South Dakota
- K25OX-D in Hagerman, Idaho
- K25OY-D in Summit County, Utah
- K25PA-D in St. George, Utah
- K26JN-D in Huntington, Utah
- K26KA-D in Drummond, Montana
- K26MZ-D in Cottage Grove, Oregon
- K26NK-D in Wichita Falls, Texas
- K26OV-D in Zuni, New Mexico
- K27JY-D in London Springs, Oregon
- K27KH-D in Orderville, Utah
- K27KX-D in Las Animas, Colorado
- K27MM-D in Tendoy/Leadore, Idaho
- K28GM-D in Rural Garfield County, Utah
- K28HL-D in Riverton, Wyoming
- K28JC-D in Enterprise, Oregon
- K28JK-D in Huntsville/Liberty, Utah
- K28JL-D in Morgan, etc., Utah
- K28JS-D in Samak, Utah
- K28KC-D in Canon City, Colorado
- K28KJ-D in Chelan, Washington
- K28KP-D in Clear Creek, Utah
- K28OS-D in Logan, Utah
- K28PI-D in Emery, Utah
- K29EM-D in Manti & Ephraim, Utah
- K29GJ-D in Tropic & Cannonville, Utah
- K29HN-D in Escalante, Utah
- K29HX-D in Wanship, Utah
- K29JQ-D in Fishlake Resort, Utah
- K29KT-D in Thoreau, New Mexico
- K29LN-D in Santa Rosa, New Mexico
- K29LZ-D in Fountain Green, Utah
- K29MC-D in Heber City, Utah
- K29MN-D in Fillmore, etc., Utah
- K29MT-D in Scofield, Utah
- K30BU-D in Leadore, Idaho
- K30EJ-D in Crested Butte, Colorado
- K30GL-D in Many Farms, Arizona
- K30JG-D in Randolph & Woodruff, Utah
- K30KG-D in Coalville, etc., Utah
- K30KU-D in Silver City, New Mexico
- K30MH-D in Overton, Nevada
- K30OA-D in Milton-Freewater, Oregon
- K30OJ-D in Las Vegas, New Mexico
- K30OS-D in Antimony, Utah
- K30OV-D in Boulder, Utah
- K30PE-D in Parowan, Enoch etc., Utah
- K30PG-D in Delta/Oak City, etc, Utah
- K30PN-D in Green River, Utah
- K30PP-D in Ferron, Utah
- K30PW-D in Salmon, Idaho
- K30QD-D in Ontario, etc., Oregon
- K31KN-D in Caineville, Utah
- K31MA-D in Big Falls, Minnesota
- K31OY-D in Pahrump, Nevada
- K32IX-D in Lihue, Hawaii
- K32JZ-D in Kabetogama, Minnesota
- K33KJ-D in Crested Butte, Colorado
- K33LV-D in Henefer, etc., Utah
- K33NT-D in Kanab, Utah
- K33PL-D in Birchdale, Minnesota
- K33PQ-D in Manila, etc, Utah
- K33QF-D in Holbrook, Idaho
- K34NG-D in La Grande, Oregon
- K34NM-D in Lamar, Colorado
- K34NT-D in Hanksville, Utah
- K34OH-D in Montpelier, Idaho
- K34PA-D in Garrison, etc., Utah
- K35CK-D in Price, Utah
- K35HB-D in Deming, New Mexico
- K35JR-D in Arrey & Derry, New Mexico
- K35NE-D in Fremont, Utah
- K35NZ-D in Ninilchick, Alaska
- K35OP-D in Park City, Utah
- K36AK-D in Blanding/Monticello, Utah
- K36BQ-D in Pahrump, Nevada
- K36GQ-D in Parlin, Colorado
- K36IM-D in Duchesne, etc., Utah
- K36JB-D in Cripple Creek, Colorado
- K36KZ-D in Max, Minnesota
- K36NW-D in Aberdeen, South Dakota
- K36PA-D in Kanarraville, etc., Utah
- K36PK-D in Peoa, etc., Utah
- K38MK-D in Cheyenne Wells, Colorado
- K48GV-D in Laketown, etc., Utah
- KAFT in Fayetteville, Arkansas
- KCOP-TV in Los Angeles, California
- KCOS in El Paso, Texas
- KCPQ in Tacoma, Washington
- KCWY-DT in Casper, Wyoming
- KECI-TV in Missoula, Montana
- KEET in Eureka, California
- KERA-TV in Dallas, Texas
- KETA-TV in Oklahoma City, Oklahoma
- KFME in Fargo, North Dakota
- KFPH-DT in Flagstaff, Arizona
- KGWR-TV in Rock Springs, Wyoming
- KHGI-TV in Kearney, Nebraska
- KHNL in Honolulu, Hawaii
- KHTM-LD in Lufkin, Texas
- KIPT in Twin Falls, Idaho
- KKEY-LP in Bakersfield, California
- KKRP-LD in St. George, Utah
- KLBK-TV in Lubbock, Texas
- KLTM-TV in Monroe, Louisiana
- KOLD-TV in Tucson, Arizona
- KOVR in Stockton, California
- KPSD-TV in Eagle Butte, South Dakota
- KQTA-LD in San Francisco, California
- KRCG in Jefferson City, Missouri
- KRDO-TV in Colorado Springs, Colorado
- KRQE in Albuquerque, New Mexico
- KSFY-TV in Sioux Falls, South Dakota
- KSIX-TV in Hilo, Hawaii
- KSTU in Salt Lake City, Utah
- KTNE-TV in Alliance, Nebraska
- KTNV-TV in Las Vegas, Nevada
- KTRK-TV in Houston, Texas
- KTVR in La Grande, Oregon
- KUBD in Ketchikan, Alaska
- KUPK in Garden City, Kansas
- KVAL-TV in Eugene, Oregon
- KVBC-LP in Reedley, California
- KVBT-LD in Santa Clara, etc., Utah
- KXDF-CD in Fairbanks, Alaska
- KXMC-TV in Minot, North Dakota
- KXXW-LD in Tyler, Texas
- KYLX-LD in Laredo, Texas
- KYMA-DT in Yuma, Arizona
- KYUR in Anchorage, Alaska
- KZAU-LD in Killeen, Texas
- W05AA-D in Roanoke, Virginia
- W11AJ-D in Franklin, North Carolina
- W12AQ-D in Black Mountain, North Carolina
- W12AR-D in Waynesville, etc., North Carolina
- W12CI-D in Hot Springs, North Carolina
- W13DT-D in Montgomery, Alabama
- W13DV-D in Crozet, Virginia
- W15DY-D in Marion, etc., North Carolina
- W21CP-D in Gloversville, New York
- W28DA-D in Pittsfield, Massachusetts
- W32EO-D in Tryon, etc., North Carolina
- W32FW-D in Adams, Massachusetts
- W34EP-D in Sapphire Valley, etc., North Carolina
- WBKO in Bowling Green, Kentucky
- WBTW in Florence, South Carolina
- WCMN-LD in St. Cloud-Sartell, Minnesota
- WEAU in Eau Claire, Wisconsin
- WEXZ-LD in Bangor, Maine
- WGME-TV in Portland, Maine
- WHAM-TV in Rochester, New York
- WHBQ-TV in Memphis, Tennessee
- WHO-DT in Des Moines, Iowa
- WIBW-TV in Topeka, Kansas
- WIRT-DT in Hibbing, Minnesota
- WIVX-LD in Cleveland, Ohio
- WJZ-TV in Baltimore, Maryland
- WLOS in Asheville, North Carolina
- WLOX in Biloxi, Mississippi
- WMAZ-TV in Macon, Georgia
- WMBB in Panama City, Florida
- WMED-TV in Calais, Maine
- WMEL-LD in Grenada, Mississippi
- WNET in Newark, New Jersey
- WNMU in Marquette, Michigan
- WNYT in Albany, New York
- WOCK-CD in Chicago, Illinois
- WORO-DT in Fajardo, Puerto Rico
- WOWK-TV in Huntington, West Virginia
- WPXS in Mount Vernon, Illinois
- WQED in Pittsburgh, Pennsylvania
- WREX in Rockford, Illinois
- WSET-TV in Lynchburg, Virginia
- WTHR in Indianapolis, Indiana
- WTKO-CD in Oneida, New York
- WTVG in Toledo, Ohio
- WTVT in Tampa, Florida
- WURH-CD in Miami, Florida
- WVEC in Hampton, Virginia
- WVTM-TV in Birmingham, Alabama
- WVUX-LD in Fairmont, West Virginia
- WZZM in Grand Rapids, Michigan

The following television stations, which are no longer licensed, formerly operated on virtual channel 13:

- K07VH-D in Sargents, Colorado
- K07ZC-D in Ellensburg/Kittitas, Washington
- K10PB-D in Montezuma Creek/Aneth, Utah
- K12OV-D in Shelter Cove, California
- K13UK-D in Kwigillingok, Alaska
- K17GC-D in Pitkin, Colorado
- K17OD-D in Silver City, New Mexico
- K26KM-D in Orr, Minnesota
- K41KZ-D in Chalfant Valley, California
- K42KR-D in Mountain View, Wyoming
- K45GD-D in Romeo, etc., Colorado
- K46HW-D in Preston, Idaho
- KHGI-LD in O'Neil, Nebraska
- KVTV in Laredo, Texas
- W13DU-D in Hardeeville, South Carolina
- WEEJ-LD in Jacksonville, Illinois
