= Channel 13 digital TV stations in the United States =

The following television stations broadcast on digital channel 13 in the United States:

- K13AT-D in Dolores, Colorado
- K13AV-D in Gunnison, Colorado, on virtual channel 13
- K13BA-D in Winthrop-Twisp, Washington
- K13BE-D in Harlowton, Montana
- K13BI-D in Entiat, Washington
- K13CP-D in Cedar City, Utah
- K13CQ-D in Rock Island, Washington
- K13DU-D in Whitewater, Montana
- K13ER-D in Cashmere, Washington
- K13FP-D in Wolf Point, Montana
- K13GP-D in Malta, Montana
- K13HA-D in Mink Creek, Idaho, on virtual channel 5, which rebroadcasts KSL-TV
- K13HK-D in Sand Springs, Montana
- K13HM-D in Myrtle Creek, Oregon
- K13IB-D in Glasgow, Montana
- K13IG-D in Sidney-Fairview, Montana
- K13IY-D in Leavenworth, Washington
- K13JD-D in Battle Mountain, Nevada
- K13JO-D in Hinsdale, Montana
- K13KH-D in Townsend, Montana
- K13KP-D in Boulder, Montana
- K13KU-D in Delta Junction, Alaska
- K13KV-D in Troy, Montana
- K13LN-D in Ekalaka, Montana
- K13LU-D in Ursine, Nevada
- K13LV-D in Caliente, Nevada
- K13MA-D in Scobey, Montana
- K13MI-D in Squaw Valley, etc., Oregon
- K13ML-D in Hotchkiss, etc., Colorado
- K13NQ-D in Ruth, Nevada
- K13NR-D in Ely & McGill, Nevada
- K13NZ-D in Shoshoni, Wyoming
- K13OC-D in Douglas, etc., Alaska
- K13OG-D in Rural Juab, etc., Utah
- K13OQ-D in Big Sandy, Montana
- K13OU-D in Chinook, Montana
- K13OW-D in Baker, Montana
- K13PE-D in Shady Grove, Oregon
- K13PF-D in Pinehurst, Oregon
- K13PI-D in Ruch & Applegate, Oregon
- K13PJ-D in Vallecito, Colorado
- K13PO-D in Hysham, Montana
- K13PU-D in Pioche, Nevada
- K13PZ-D in Poplar, Montana
- K13QE-D in Driggs, Idaho
- K13QH-D in Swan Valley/Irwin, Idaho
- K13QK-D in Virgin, Utah
- K13QY-D in Dingle, etc., Idaho
- K13RD-D in Collbran, Colorado
- K13RK-D in Roswell, New Mexico
- K13RN-D in Old Harbor, Alaska
- K13RR-D in Tok, Alaska
- K13RV-D in Leadore, Idaho
- K13SA-D in Port Heiden, Alaska
- K13SE-D in Stony River, Alaska
- K13SM-D in Slana, Alaska
- K13SN-D in Nucla, Colorado
- K13SV-D in Pedro Bay, Alaska
- K13SY-D in Birch Creek, Alaska
- K13TD-D in White Mountain, Alaska
- K13TE-D in Bettles, Alaska
- K13TJ-D in Mountain Village, Alaska
- K13TN-D in Manley Hot Springs, Alaska
- K13TR-D in Homer, Alaska
- K13UF-D in Rexburg, Idaho
- K13UL-D in Hillsboro, New Mexico
- K13UO-D in Cold Bay, Alaska
- K13UV-D in Napakiak, Alaska
- K13WT-D in Plevna, Montana
- K13XG-D in Ismay Canyon, Colorado
- K13XH-D in Weber Canyon, Colorado
- K13XW-D in Akron, Colorado, on virtual channel 6, which rebroadcasts KRMA-TV
- K13XX-D in Hesperus, Colorado
- K13ZI-D in Colorado Springs, Colorado
- K13ZL-D in Fresno, California
- K13ZN-D in Heron, Montana
- K13ZQ-D in Lubbock, Texas
- K13ZS-D in Sargents, Colorado, on virtual channel 9
- K13AAD-D in Long Valley Junction, Utah
- K13AAE-D in Healy, Alaska
- K13AAF-D in Monticello/Blanding, Utah
- K13AAH-D in Salina & Redmond, Utah
- K13AAI-D in Marysvale, Utah
- K13AAJ-D in Woodland & Kamas, Utah
- K13AAL-D in Beaver etc., Utah
- K13AAM-D in Garrison, etc., Utah
- K13AAN-D in Roosevelt, Utah, on virtual channel 13, which rebroadcasts KSTU
- K13AAO-D in Helper, Utah
- K13AAP-D in East Price, Utah, on virtual channel 13, which rebroadcasts KSTU
- K13AAQ-D in Prineville, etc., Oregon
- K13AAX-D in Redding, California
- KAKW-DT in Killeen, Texas
- KBDI-TV in Broomfield, Colorado, on virtual channel 12
- KBZK in Bozeman, Montana
- KCOP-TV in Los Angeles, California, on virtual channel 13
- KCOS in El Paso, Texas
- KCPQ in Tacoma, Washington, on virtual channel 13
- KDPH-LD in Phoenix, Arizona, on virtual channel 48
- KECI-TV in Missoula, Montana
- KEMV in Mountain View, Arkansas
- KETA-TV in Oklahoma City, Oklahoma
- KETG in Arkadelphia, Arkansas
- KFJX in Pittsburg, Kansas
- KFME in Fargo, North Dakota
- KFPH-DT in Flagstaff, Arizona, on virtual channel 13
- KGWR-TV in Rock Springs, Wyoming
- KHFD-LD in Dallas, Texas
- KHTM-LD in Lufkin, Texas
- KHVO in Hilo, Hawaii
- KJDA-LD in Sherman, Texas
- KKEY-LP in Bakersfield, California
- KLTM-TV in Monroe, Louisiana
- KNTV in San Jose, California, on virtual channel 11
- KOLD-TV in Tucson, Arizona
- KOTI in Klamath Falls, Oregon
- KPLO-TV in Reliance, South Dakota
- KPSD-TV in Eagle Butte, South Dakota
- KQVE-LD in San Antonio, Texas
- KREY-TV in Montrose, Colorado
- KRGV-TV in Weslaco, Texas
- KRQE in Albuquerque, New Mexico
- KSFY-TV in Sioux Falls, South Dakota
- KSGW-TV in Sheridan, Wyoming
- KTNE-TV in Alliance, Nebraska
- KTNV-TV in Las Vegas, Nevada
- KTRK-TV in Houston, Texas, on virtual channel 13
- KTRV-TV in Nampa, Idaho
- KTVR in La Grande, Oregon
- KUBD in Ketchikan, Alaska
- KUPK in Garden City, Kansas
- KUTA-LD in Ogden, Utah
- KVAL-TV in Eugene, Oregon
- KXDF-CD in Fairbanks, Alaska
- KXHG-LD in Sunnyside, Washington
- KXLY-TV in Spokane, Washington
- KXMC-TV in Minot, North Dakota
- KXXW-LD in Tyler, Texas
- KYLX-LD in Laredo, Texas
- KYMA-DT in Yuma, Arizona
- W13DI-D in Yauco, etc., Puerto Rico, on virtual channel 54, which rebroadcasts WCCV-TV
- W13DP-D in Youngstown, Ohio
- W13DQ-D in Atlanta, Georgia
- W13DS-D in Cleveland, Ohio
- W13DT-D in Montgomery, Alabama
- W13DV-D in Crozet, Virginia
- WABI-TV in Bangor, Maine
- WASA-LD in Port Jervis, New York
- WBKO in Bowling Green, Kentucky
- WBRZ-TV in Baton Rouge, Louisiana
- WBTW in Florence, South Carolina
- WDSS-LD in Syracuse, New York, uses WNYI's spectrum
- WEDQ in Tampa, Florida, which uses WEDU's spectrum, on virtual channel 13
- WEDU in Tampa, Florida, on virtual channel 13
- WGBY-TV in Springfield, Massachusetts
- WHBQ-TV in Memphis, Tennessee
- WHO-DT in Des Moines, Iowa
- WHYY-TV in Wilmington, Delaware, on virtual channel 12
- WIBW-TV in Topeka, Kansas
- WIRT-DT in Hibbing, Minnesota
- WIVX-LD in Cleveland, Ohio
- WKOB-LD in New York, New York
- WLOS in Asheville, North Carolina, on virtual channel 13
- WMAZ-TV in Macon, Georgia
- WMBB in Panama City, Florida
- WMCN-TV in Princeton, New Jersey, uses WHYY-TV's spectrum, on virtual channel 44
- WMEL-LD in Grenada, Mississippi
- WMOW in Crandon, Wisconsin
- WNYI in Ithaca, New York
- WODN-LD in Portage, Indiana
- WORO-DT in Fajardo, Puerto Rico, on virtual channel 13
- WPEC in West Palm Beach, Florida
- WPXS in Mount Vernon, Illinois, on virtual channel 13
- WRCB in Chattanooga, Tennessee
- WREX in Rockford, Illinois
- WSKY-TV in Manteo, North Carolina
- WTHR in Indianapolis, Indiana, on virtual channel 13
- WTLV in Jacksonville, Florida
- WTOK-TV in Meridian, Mississippi
- WTSF in Ashland, Kentucky
- WTVG in Toledo, Ohio
- WVEC in Hampton, Virginia
- WVTM-TV in Birmingham, Alabama
- WVFX-TV in Clarksburg, West Virginia on virtual channel 10
- WWPX-TV in Martinsburg, West Virginia, on virtual channel 60
- WXVO-LD in Pascagoula, Mississippi
- WZZM in Grand Rapids, Michigan

The following stations, which are no longer licensed, formerly broadcast on digital channel 13 in the United States:

- K13EZ-D in Squilchuck St. Park, Washington
- K13HU-D in Fort Jones, etc., California
- K13UK-D in Kwigillingok, Alaska
- KVTV in Laredo, Texas
- W13DU-D in Hardeeville, South Carolina
