= WFEB =

- Sylacauga, Alabama; United States
- Frequency: 1340 kHz
- Branding: 100.9 The Mountain

Programming
- Format: Classic rock
- Affiliations: Compass Media Networks; United Stations Radio Networks

Ownership
- Owner: John Kennedy; (Lake Broadcasting, Inc.)
- Sister stations: WAXC-LD, WDNG, WKGA

History
- First air date: March 1945

Technical information
- Licensing authority: FCC
- Facility ID: 700
- Class: C
- Power: 1,000 watts unlimited
- Transmitter coordinates: 33°10′13″N 86°13′58″W
- Translator: 100.9 W265DV (Sylacauga)

Links
- Public license information: Public file; LMS
- Webcast: Listen live
- Website: wfeb1009.com

WFEB (1340 AM) is a radio station licensed to serve Sylacauga, Alabama, United States. The station is owned by John Kennedy, through licensee Lake Broadcasting, Inc., and broadcasts to the Anniston, Alabama, area. It broadcasts a classic rock format.

The station is an affiliate of the Tennessee Titans radio network. In addition to its previous mix of local and syndicated news and talk programs, the station has broadcast a "Swap and Shop" program since the late 1960s.

== History ==
In January 2008, Alabama Broadcasting Company, Inc. reached an agreement to transfer control of WFEB to Powers Broadcasting Company, Inc. The FCC approved the deal on February 12, 2008, and the transaction was consummated on March 18, 2008.

On August 20, 2018, Lake Broadcasting Inc., home of WKGA-Kowaliga Country 97.5 and WAXC-TV 3 in Alexander City, Alabama added WFEB to their group and flipped the format from news/talk to adult contemporary. The station is now WFEB-B101 Sylacauga's Best HITS & All Time Favorites. The purchase was consummated on December 20, 2018, at a price of $150,000.

On September 2, 2024, WFEB changed their format from adult contemporary to classic rock, branded as "100.9 The Mountain".

== Previous logo ==
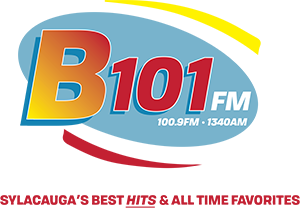
