= WAXC-LD =

Television station in Alexander City, Alabama

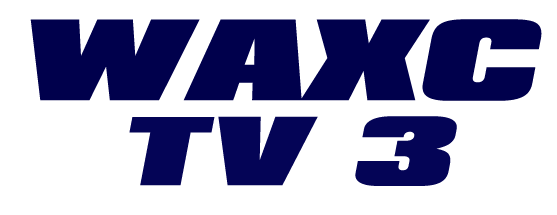
- Alexander City, Alabama; United States
- Channels: Digital: 32 (UHF); Virtual: 31
- Branding: WAXC-TV 3

Programming
- Affiliations: 31.1: Heartland

Ownership
- Owner: Lake Broadcasting, Inc.
- Sister stations: WDNG, WFEB, WKGA

History
- Founded: October 24, 1994
- First air date: July 31, 1995
- Former call signs: W64CC (1994–1996); WAXC-LP (1996–2011)
- Former channel numbers: Analog: 64 (UHF, 1995–1999), 25 (UHF, 1999–2011); Digital: 31 (UHF, 2010–2012)
- Former affiliations: UPN (1995–2000); Network One (secondary, 1995–1997); Pax/i/Ion (2000–2009); Independent (2009–2013); Retro TV (2013–2024)
- Call sign meaning: Alexander City

Technical information
- Licensing authority: FCC
- Facility ID: 8117
- Class: LD
- ERP: 15 kW
- HAAT: 100.9 m (331 ft)
- Transmitter coordinates: 32°56′47″N 85°56′33″W

Links
- Public license information: LMS

WAXC-LD is a low-power television station in Alexander City, Alabama, United States, affiliated with Heartland. The station is branded as WAXC-TV 3 with the number 3 representing its channel position on Charter Spectrum. The channel produces Auburn Blitz, a program that covers sports at Auburn University. The station also produces telecast of local high school sports and Sportz Biltz, a show focusing on Alabama sports.

== History ==
For many years, the station was co-owned with WETU-LD and carried the same programming including a UPN affiliation during the 1990s. After dropping UPN, WAXC became a Pax TV (later i and Ion) affiliate.

== Sportz Blitz ==
Sportz Blitz is a weekly live interactive sports talk television show broadcast across central Alabama. The show originates from WAXC's studios and is simulcast on WKGA 97.5 FM radio in east central Alabama. The show is also carried by WOTM-LD in the Birmingham market, and WETU-LD in the Montgomery market.

The show focuses on Alabama high school and college sports, specifically Auburn University and the University of Alabama. Additional topics include major national professional sports stories and outdoors sports such as fishing and hunting. Differentiating the show from news broadcasts and other sports television shows, the hosts take live calls from the audience and discuss issues on the air in the same manner as sports radio shows.

=== History ===
Sportz Blitz began airing during football season in the fall of 2006. The broadcast schedule was extended for Season 2 (2007–2008) to air year round. In the fall of 2007, a spin-off program began airing, Sportz Blitz Outdoors, featuring the same hosts and Bassmaster Elite Series professional fisherman Greg Vinson providing outdoor sports instruction. On February 26, 2008, a new radio call-in show spin-off was created called Sportz Blitz Overtime which airs on WKGA (97.5 FM) following the regular television broadcast.

== Subchannel ==
Subchannel of WAXC-LD
Channel	Res.	Short name	Programming
31.1	480i	WAXC	Heartland (4:3)
