= WDNG =

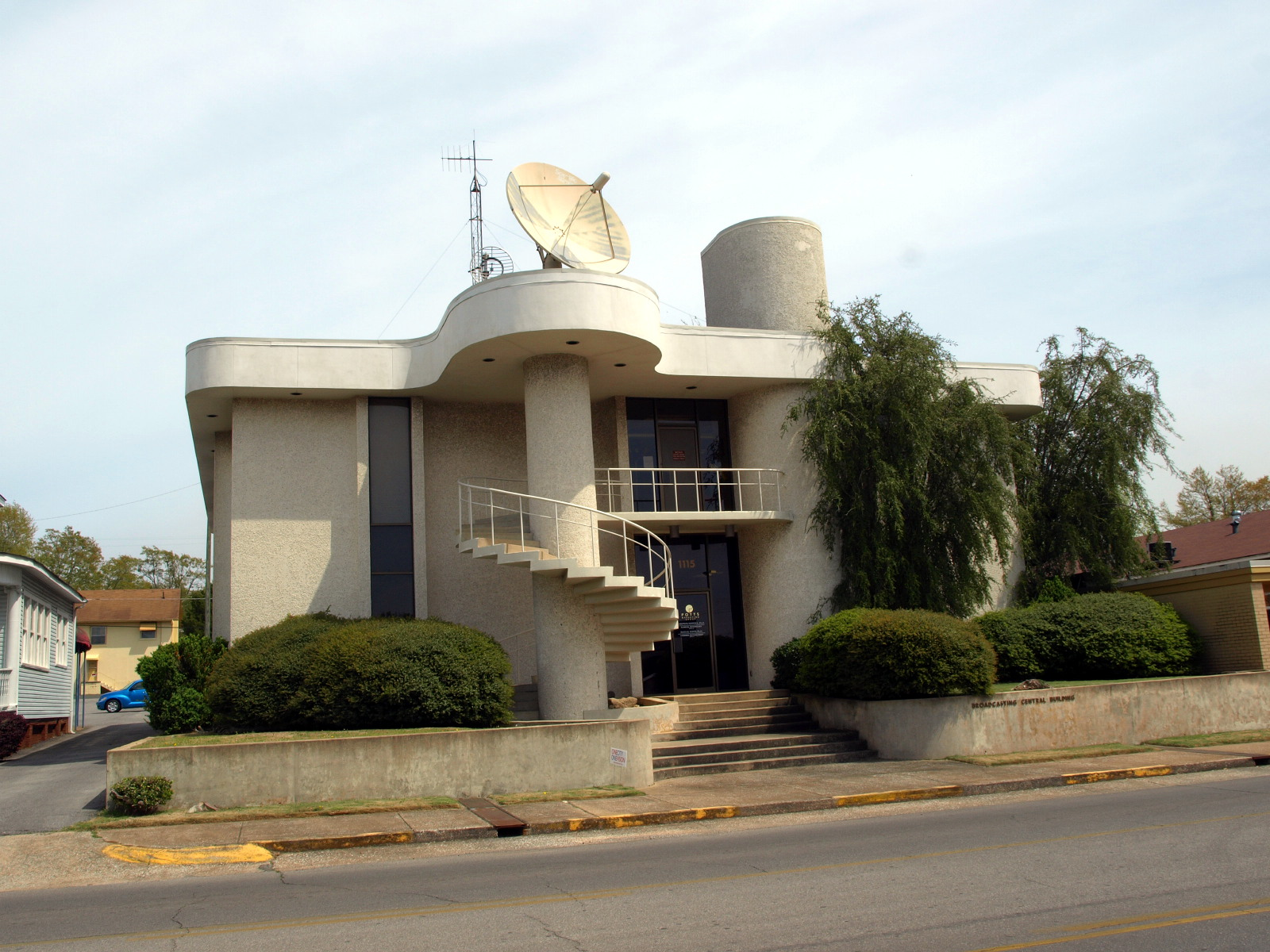
- Station building
- Anniston, Alabama; United States
- Broadcast area: Anniston/Oxford/Jacksonville
- Frequency: 1450 kHz
- Branding: 95.1 The Mountain

Programming
- Format: Classic hits

Ownership
- Owner: John Kennedy; (Lake Broadcasting, Inc.)
- Sister stations: WAXC-LD, WFEB, WKGA

History
- First air date: July 1, 1957
- Call sign meaning: David, Nancy, Greg - children of original station founders

Technical information
- Licensing authority: FCC
- Facility ID: 71344
- Class: C
- Power: 1,000 watts (unlimited)
- Transmitter coordinates: 33°39′51.5″N 85°50′58.2″W
- Translator: 95.1 W236CQ (Anniston)

Links
- Public license information: Public file; LMS
- Webcast: Listen live
- Website: 951themountain.com

WDNG (1450 AM, "95.1 The Mountain") is a radio station licensed to serve Anniston, Alabama, United States. The station is owned by John Kennedy, through licensee Lake Broadcasting, Inc. (LBI Media). It airs a classic hits format.

The station was assigned the WDNG call letters by the Federal Communications Commission.

On April 23, 2021 WDNG changed their format from adult contemporary to classic hits, branded as "95.1 The Mountain".

== History ==
The station first made a mark in the Anniston market playing Top 40 music with a huge local news focus after playing adult standards for about eight years. WDNG once boasted a staff of 17 full-time employees and several part-timers, a large number for a market as small as Anniston. Advertising revenue was off the charts for years, providing a stable income to support the staff and grow the station. In late 1968, WDNG left rented space in the old First National Bank of Anniston building on Noble Street and moved to what was named "The Beautiful Broadcasting Central Building" at 1115 Leighton Avenue. The facility was a state-of-the-art operation for the time. Top forty music was phased out and the station became a full service adult contemporary outlet around 1980, moving to the CBS Radio Network for news, sports and many features. University of Alabama football and Walter Wellborn High School football broadcasts continued after the switch and sports programming was ramped up using CBS feeds for events such as Major League Baseball.

WDNG slowly shifted to a news/talk format starting around 1983 into the early 1990s. Its first morning local talk show featured fiery host Ed Benedict in 1985. In time WDNG moved away from music and to all talk and news. This move was made easier by the station's long-time commitment to local news coverage, having once operated a two-person local news department covering Calhoun and North Talladega Counties.

WDNG News was in operation as far back as 1959 under former station owner Tom Potts, Sr. It was the only Anniston radio station to offer same-day coverage of the May 14, 1961 Freedom Riders bus burning, which is considered one of the landmark events of the civil rights era. Two station employees were at the scene of the bus burning, taking notes. They were called in as witnesses by the U.S. District Attorney.

On March 22, 2009, FBI files were released under a Freedom of Information Act request made by The Anniston Star that included several references to WDNG's coverage of the civil rights movement. In one telegram from the Anniston FBI field office, station assistant general manager Bobby Price is referred to by name as having reported in a newscast facts surrounding the Willie Brewster murder case. The telegram was sent to the Washington office and was directed to J. Edgar Hoover, the FBI chief at the time. WDNG was at the forefront of coverage of the Brewster slaying. The black man was shot down in July 1965 while driving home from work at an Anniston pipe shop. A white man was convicted in the murder in December 1965 by an all-white, all-male jury. WDNG news provided national radio coverage of the trial for several news organizations (UPI and Mutal Radio News) under the leadership of station News Director Dave Fitz. So strong was WDNG's coverage of the civil rights movement that the station's transmitter building was bombed in the early 1960s. The case was never solved, but it was thought to be an act of violence aimed at the station for its news coverage of various stories dealing with the civil rights movement in Anniston.

Throughout the history of WDNG Radio's news department, it won numerous state and regional awards for coverage of local news events. The station's coverage of the Audrey Marie Hilley murder case in the 1980s also brought it attention. Hilley was an Anniston secretary who was convicted of using poison to kill her husband and attempting to do the same to her daughter. Her flight from justice spawned two true crime novels and a television movie made for a network. WDNG broke the news of many of the Hilley case's elements and provided award-winning coverage of the case that played out over close to a decade. Two different WDNG News Directors, Mike Stedham and later Chris Pope, gave the region countless up-to-the-minute details as thousands stayed in touch with the case. Stedham is mentioned in one of the novels about the case as breaking the news on WDNG about Hilley's recapture in a small Vermont city.

== 21st century ==
In September 2012, the station went silent for technical reasons for nearly one month. It was later discovered that the station's co-owner, J.J. Dark, was delinquent on tax payments. WDNG went back on the air in October 2012 after a transfer of full ownership to co-owner Charles Fuller. Beginning in 2013, under the leadership of Charles's daughter, Charlene Fuller-Gossett, the station established a news department that focused on Anniston government and crime.

During winter storms in early 2014, WDNG was the only radio station in Calhoun County, Alabama that interrupted regular programming and provided updated weather and road information every hour. Primary and general elections were heavily covered by the news department that year, and special reports from the Calhoun County Sheriff's Office were broadcast during ballot counts.

Between July 2015 and July 2016, WDNG provided a live simulcast of every formal meeting of the Anniston City Council.

In April 2016 the station purchased an unbuilt translator in the Talladega area and was permitted to move it to Anniston to rebroadcast the station. That facility came on the air in early December, 2016. (W236CQ 95.1 FM) (Taken from Alabama Broadcast Media Page)

Syndicated programming included Casey Kasem's American Top 40 and Joe Cortez's Retro Pop Reunion.

On August 6, 2018 WDNG changed its format and become a sister station of WFHK, under the new name of MY 95 FM. As signification of the format change, the station played the Lynyrd Skynyrd songs "Sweet Home Alabama" and "Free Bird" on repeat for 3 days prior to the switch. WFHK announced the station's format change via Facebook on August 4, 2018, stating that it will have a music format and stay focused on the Calhoun County, Alabama area and its surrounding areas. The station's call letters would remain the same but now owned by Stocks Broadcasting, Inc.

The station was purchased by John Kennedy, owner of Lake Broadcasting, Inc. (LBI Media), with the intent of changing format. On April 23, 2021, WDNG changed their format from adult contemporary to classic rock, branded as "95.1 The Mountain Anniston's Classic Station". WDNG now boasts being the official home of Jacksonville High School Golden Eagle football and basketball and Georgia Bulldogs football and basketball and airs everything NASCAR, MRN, PRN, Indy Car, Xfinity, Camping World Truck Races. The station now has live talent in each day part, starting each day with a beloved, hometown favorite taking to WDNG airways "Mountain Mornings with G and JP", a mix of local information and flavor and light-hearted humor.
