= ABC 11 =

ABC 11 may refer to:

== Current affiliates ==
- KHSD-TV in Lead, South Dakota (satellite of KOTA-TV in Rapid City, SD)
- WBKB-DT3 in Alpena, Michigan
- WHAS-TV in Louisville, Kentucky
- WJHL-DT2 in Johnson City, Tennessee
- WTOK-TV in Meridian, Mississippi
- WTVD in Raleigh–Durham, North Carolina, which operates the abc15.com website and is owned and operated by the ABC network

== Formerly affiliated ==
- KAQY in Monroe, Louisiana (1998–2014)
- KNTV in San Jose, California (1960–2000)
- KTHI in Fargo, North Dakota (1959–1983)
- KYMA in Yuma, Arizona–El Centro, California (1988–1991)
- WLUK in Green Bay, Wisconsin (1959–1983)
- WTCN in Minneapolis–Saint Paul, Minnesota (1953–1961)
- WXIA in Atlanta, Georgia (1951–1980)
