= KIVA (TV) =

American television station (1953–1970)

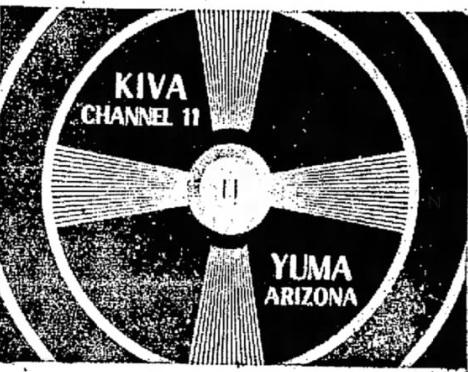
- Yuma, Arizona; United States
- Channels: Analog: 11 (VHF)

Programming
- Affiliations: NBC (1953–1970); DuMont (secondary, 1953–1956); CBS (secondary, 1953–1963); ABC (secondary, 1953–1963)

Ownership
- Owner: Merrill Telecasting Company

History
- First air date: October 18, 1953
- Last air date: January 31, 1970
- Call sign meaning: "Imperial Valley"

Technical information
- Licensing authority: FCC
- ERP: 316 kW
- HAAT: 134 m (440 ft)
- Transmitter coordinates: 32°44′42″N 114°44′19″W

Links
- Public license information: Public file; LMS

KIVA (channel 11) was a television station in Yuma, Arizona, United States. It was the first local television station in Yuma and, for more than half of its existence, the only local station. It signed on October 8, 1953, and signed off January 31, 1970, being affiliated with NBC throughout its history. For more than half of its existence, it was owned by Bruce Merrill. The station shut down because of economic troubles resulting from the presence of three total stations in the market.

== Construction and early years ==
The Imperial Valley gained its first television station on March 25, 1953, when the Federal Communications Commission (FCC) awarded a permit to Valley Telecasting to construct a television station on VHF channel 11. The original studios and transmitter would be located at Pilot Knob in California, about 10 miles (16 km) west of Yuma. Their old studios are still standing along the Frontage Road southeast of the Winterhaven Agricultural Inspection Station on Interstate 8.

On October 6, 1953, the station, which had by that time acquired the call letters KIVA, sent out a very faint test pattern by accident, but it was received by several people. Two days later, the station was broadcasting a full-strength test signal, and it began regularly scheduled service on October 18. It was the first television station in Arizona outside of Phoenix or Tucson.

As the only local television station in the market, it carried select programming from NBC, ABC, CBS, and DuMont. It operated on Pacific Time, so the program start times in Yuma were an hour later than typical, as Yuma was on Mountain Time. Harry C. Butcher, owner of a radio station in Santa Barbara, California, acquired KIVA in 1957 as the station neared bankruptcy, with television program providers and a dance school in El Centro among the creditors and assets exceeding liabilities by $200,000; in 1959, Butcher brought in additional investors under the name of Electro Investors.

== Merrill ownership and closure ==
The 1960s would see Bruce Merrill, a cable television pioneer, enter the picture. Merrill had come to the Imperial Valley and Coachella Valley in the late 1950s, intending to build a cable television system to bring Phoenix, Tucson, San Diego, and Los Angeles signals into the market. KIVA was losing money, and Butcher, believing Merrill's venture would compete with his, put up strong opposition. Not able to convince Butcher otherwise, Merrill bought him out and built the cable television system. Just as Merrill had anticipated, KIVA began to prosper as well, being subsidized by the cable system's operations. The station built new studios in Yuma at 13th Street and 3rd Avenue. It served Yuma with its primary signal and was microwaved into cable systems serving El Centro, California and Mexicali, Mexico, but its success became a two-edged sword, as it attracted competition. The FCC approved three additional construction permits for the market, one for KBLU-TV (later KSWT, now KYMA-DT) in July 1962 and two others for stations to serve El Centro on channels 7 and 9 in April 1963. Merrill, who believed that the market could not support multiple local television stations, fought KBLU-TV and the El Centro stations; as early as 1960, the possibility of Yuma's other TV allotment being put into service was cited as the business's greatest threat. He claimed that KIVA "would probably go out of business within a year if KBLU-TV were allowed to open". The new station had also secured CBS affiliation, and KIVA additionally had lost ABC.

While the competition did hurt KIVA's profits, conditions were not quite as bleak as Merrill had predicted, and the station continued to operate well after KBLU-TV's sign-on in December 1963. In 1966, Merrill entered into an agreement that would have seen KIVA be replaced. He agreed to purchase KXO and its construction permit for KXO-TV on channel 7 in 1966 for $430,000, a move which would have led to the end of channel 11 by relocating it onto the El Centro construction permit; however, the deal was not consummated. In 1967, Merrill spun off the cable television business and became sole proprietor of KIVA as Merrill Telecasting. A third television station, KECC-TV (now KECY-TV), entered the market in December 1968, and KIVA eventually became unable to sustain business. On January 14, 1970, Merrill announced that KIVA would leave the air at the end of the month, stating that he believed the market would have to grow fivefold to support all three stations. Its NBC affiliation passed to KBLU-TV, which also moved into its studios.

A new channel 11 construction permit was granted to Manning Telecasting in September 1982; however, Manning's financial problems led to a forced sale of the licensee to a creditor and then two more sales before the station went on air as KYMA in January 1988. This station effectively merged with KSWT in 2020, using the latter's license.
