= Fox 5 =

Fox 5 is a television station branding associated with the Fox Broadcasting Company.

Fox 5 may also refer to:

== TV stations in the United States ==
=== Fox owned-and-operated ===
- WAGA-TV in Atlanta, Georgia
- WNYW in New York, New York
- WTTG in Washington, D.C.

=== Fox-affiliated stations ===
- KFBB-DT2 in Great Falls, Montana
- KFYR-DT2 in Bismarck, North Dakota
- KIDK/KXPI-LD in Idaho Falls, Idaho (cable channel; broadcasts on channel 3.2)
- KSWB-TV in San Diego, California (cable channel; broadcasts on channel 69)
- KVVU-TV in Henderson–Las Vegas, Nevada
- WCYB-DT3, a digital channel of WCYB-TV in Bristol, Virginia
- WHIZ-DT2, a digital channel of WHIZ-TV in Zanesville, Ohio (cable channel; broadcasts on channel 18.2)

=== Formerly Fox stations ===
- KIVV-TV (now KHSD-TV) in Lead–Rapid City, South Dakota (1996–2016)
- KRBK in Springfield, Missouri (broadcasts on channel 49; branded as Fox 5 from 2014–2018)

== Other uses ==
- FOX-5, the Distant Early Warning site at Qikiqtarjuaq, Nunavut, Canada (formerly Broughton Island)

== See also ==
- Fox Television Stations
- Fox (international)
