= Channel 5 branded TV stations in the United States =

The following television stations in the United States brand as channel 5 (though neither using virtual channel 5 nor broadcasting on physical RF channel 5):

- KCWQ-LD in Palm Springs, California
- KECY-DT2 in El Centro, California
- KION-TV in Salinas, California, which brands as 5/46
- KRBK in Springfield, Missouri
- KSBY-DT2 in San Luis Obispo, California
- KSWB-TV in San Diego, California
- KTKA-DT3 in Topeka, Kansas
- KXPI-LD in Pocatello, Idaho
- WBGH-CA in Binghamton, New York
- WIYE-LD2 in Parkersburg, West Virginia
- WLAJ-DT2 in Lansing, Michigan
- WWCW in Lynchburg, Virginia

The following television stations in the United States formerly branded as channel 5:

- KSNB-TV in York, Nebraska
- KWWT in Odessa, Texas

The following television stations in the United States, which are no longer broadcasting, formerly branded as channel 5:

- Toledo 5, a cable-only station in Toledo, Ohio
