= KECY-TV =

Television station in El Centro, California

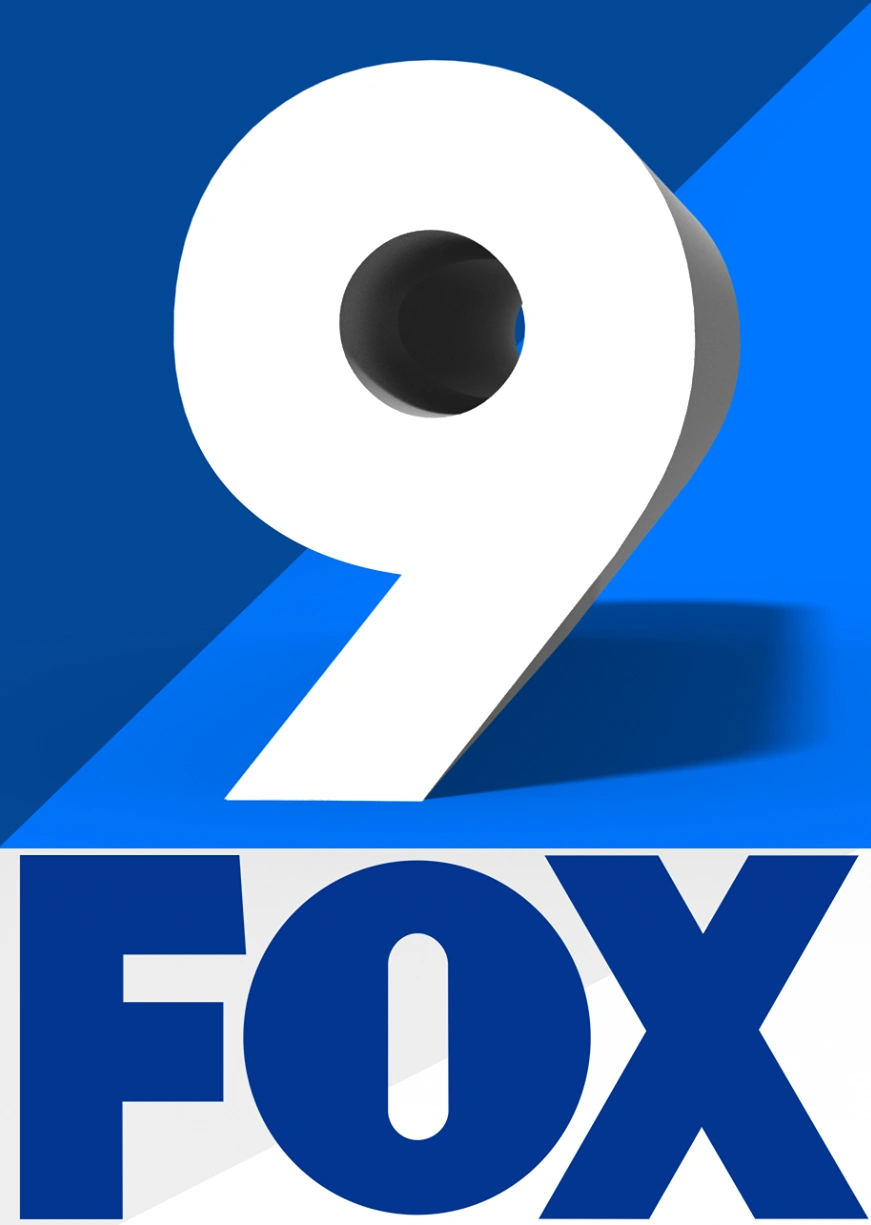
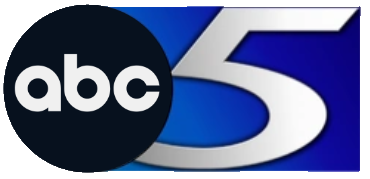

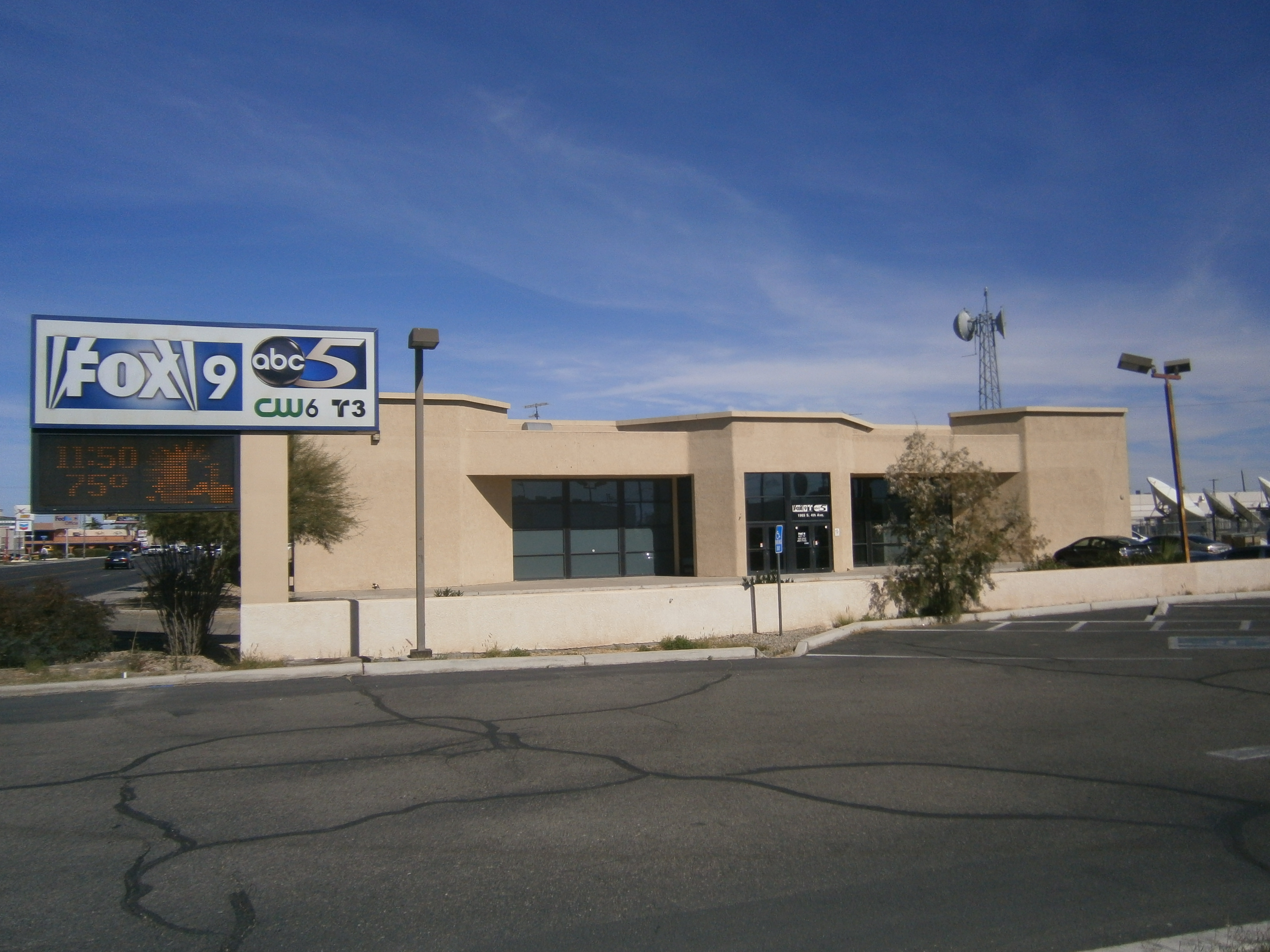
- Offices of KECY
- El Centro, California; Yuma, Arizona; United States
- City: El Centro, California
- Channels: Digital: 9 (VHF); Virtual: 9
- Branding: Fox 9; ABC 5; News 11 on ABC 5 (9.2); Desert CW6 (9.3); Telemundo 3 (9.4)

Programming
- Affiliations: 9.1: Fox / MyNetworkTV; 9.2: ABC; 9.3: The CW Plus; 9.4: Telemundo

Ownership
- Owner: News-Press & Gazette Company; (NPG of Yuma-El Centro, LLC)
- Sister stations: KYMA-DT, KESE-LD

History
- First air date: December 11, 1968
- Former call signs: KECC-TV (1968–1981)
- Former channel numbers: Analog: 9 (VHF, 1968–2009); Digital: 48 (UHF, 2004–2009)
- Former affiliations: Primary: ABC (1968–1970, 1982–1985); CBS (1970–1982, 1985–1994); Secondary: UPN (1995–2006)
- Call sign meaning: El Centro Yuma

Technical information
- Licensing authority: FCC
- Facility ID: 51208
- ERP: 50 kW
- HAAT: 478 m (1,568 ft)
- Transmitter coordinates: 33°3′19.1″N 114°49′46.9″W

Links
- Public license information: Public file; LMS
- Website: kyma.com/fox-9/

KECY-TV (channel 9) is a television station licensed to El Centro, California, United States, serving the Yuma, Arizona–El Centro, California market as an affiliate of Fox, MyNetworkTV, ABC and The CW Plus. It is owned by the News-Press & Gazette Company alongside low-power Telemundo affiliate KESE-LD (channel 35), and is co-managed with dual CBS/NBC affiliate KYMA-DT (channel 13). The three stations share studios on South 4th Avenue in downtown Yuma, with an advertising sales office on West Main Street in El Centro; KECY-TV's transmitter is located in the Chocolate Mountains.

== History ==
On April 18, 1962, the Federal Communications Commission (FCC) signed an agreement with Mexico, effective September 4, allowing the allocation of channels 7 and 9 to El Centro and giving the Imperial Valley its first opportunity for local VHF television. Before the channels were added to the Table of Allocations, Tele-Broadcasters of California, Inc., applied to build a station on channel 7 on July 5, 1962, requesting a waiver from the FCC to do so. KXO-TV, Inc., submitted a rival channel 7 bid on September 14, 1962, meaning that the FCC would need to decide who would be awarded the construction permit. To avoid delays in build-out, Tele-Broadcasters agreed to amend its application on November 9, 1962, to specify operations on channel 9. The FCC approved both applications on April 10, 1963, with channels 7 and 9 being designated as KXO-TV and KECC-TV respectively, and soon after, ABC announced that it would affiliate with KECC, who expected to be on the air by September 1.

The station would not be constructed on time, as the owner of KIVA, channel 11 in Yuma, filed for reconsideration of the grant of KECC's construction permit, claiming that the Yuma–El Centro market could not support multiple local television stations, and predicting economic injury to his station. KIVA's claim was denied by the FCC on July 30, 1963, but was referred to a federal appeals court, where the case was decided May 22, 1964, in favor of the El Centro stations. After the case was settled, KECC was still not ready to go to air, and the FCC had to extend its construction permit several times.

In April 1966, Tele-Broadcasters announced its sale to United Broadcasting Co., headed by Richard Eaton, in a $1.9 million deal, which included the KECC construction permit and two radio stations. United Broadcasting filed the purchase application on August 29, and the FCC approved it the following April.

The station received a significant boost in February 1968, when the FCC granted it permission to move its transmitter location from downtown El Centro to Black Mountain and to increase power from 55 kW to 120 kW, allowing its signal to serve both El Centro and Yuma. KECC-TV received program operation authorization from the FCC on December 6, 1968, and on December 11, more than six years after the station moved its application to channel 9, KECC-TV took to the air as an ABC affiliate, becoming the third station in the market, and giving each of the major commercial television networks a primary affiliate. Another boost in fortunes came in January 1970, when KIVA, the market's NBC affiliate, announced that it would cease operations at the end of the month. KBLU-TV (later KSWT and now KYMA-DT), the CBS affiliate at that time, announced that it would take over the NBC affiliation, and KECC moved to acquire the CBS affiliation.

It was not long before KECC-TV found itself embroiled in controversy. In March 1970, WKTR-TV serving Dayton, Ohio, was accused of bribing Thomas G. Sullivan to promote affiliation with the network for the station. Evidence from the Dayton investigation resulted in a hearing order issued in November 1971 for stations owned by Richard Eaton, including KECC, after Eaton was suspected of bribery in entering into a "consultancy agreement" with an ABC employee in 1969. Faced with the prospect of an FCC hearing, and financially drained from actions against two of his other TV stations, Eaton declared his intent to sell all of his TV stations. No sale would occur for years. Eaton was cleared of the bribery charges in September 1974, but was ruled by an FCC administrative law judge to have "strayed from conduct expected of licensee". The judge recommended granting KECC-TV its license provided that Eaton sell the station within 60 days, but the FCC Broadcast Bureau appealed the ruling.

United Broadcasting reached an agreement with Acton Corp. in December 1977 to sell the station for $1 million, pending resolution of the review of KECC's license request. The application for assignment of permit was filed in July 1978 under Acton Corp. subsidiary El Centro Communications, but by the start of 1981, the FCC had not yet resolved KECC's licensing issues and had not approved the sale of the station, and in January 1981, the application to sell the station to Acton was dismissed.

In March 1981, United Broadcasting requested to sell KECC-TV to Esquire, Inc. for $1.025 million. The sale was approved by the FCC in September and consummated in October. The new owners, operating under the subsidiary of Pacific Media Corporation, quickly began making changes at the station. In October, Pacific Media was granted permission to increase the station's power from 120 kW to 316 kW, the maximum allowed for an upper-band VHF station, changed the station's call letters from KECC-TV to KECY-TV in December 1981, and switched affiliation from CBS back to ABC on February 1, 1982, matching the affiliation of Pacific Media's other TV station, KESQ-TV. Nearly twenty years after first applying for a construction permit, and after more than thirteen years operating under Program Test Authority, KECY-TV was granted a license on June 30, 1982.

Esquire began selling off its broadcast properties and in July 1983, announced the sale of both KECY-TV and KESQ-TV to Cimarron Broadcasting, headed by recording artist Harry Nilsson, for $4.5 million. Esquire and Cimarron were not able to complete the deal, and on July 23, 1984, Esquire sold Pacific Media Corporation and KECY to its former chairman of the board, John Smart, for $1.5 million. KECY announced in December 1984 its intention to return to being a CBS affiliate, as of March 3, 1985, ending three years as an ABC affiliate, and to broadcast on Mountain Time, instead of Pacific Time, as it had done with ABC. Smart sought to sell the station to First National Entertainment Corp. in September 1986 for $2.35 million, but the sale did not go through, and KECY was finally sold, along with Pacific Media Corporation to North Carolina–based mother-and-son attorneys, Katherine R. and Robinson O. Everett, in February 1989 for $1.565 million. Robinson Everett assumed principal control of the station following the death of his mother Katherine Everett in April 1992.

Everett and CBS began to have differences of opinion on several issues, notably CBS opposition to Everett's desire to convert Palm Springs-area satellite station K40DB (now KDFX-CD), which he owned, to a full power station. In April 1994, KECY announced that it would be switching to Fox, who supported Everett's efforts to build a full power station in the Coachella Valley. The switch occurred in September of that year, sending the CBS affiliation to then-ABC affiliate KSWT. Prior to the switch, the majority of the area's cable providers carried XETV (channel 6) from San Diego (which is now an affiliate of Canal 5) on the California side of the market and KNXV-TV (channel 15) from Phoenix (which continued to be carried on cable after it switched to ABC) on the Arizona side; Foxnet was offered in some areas of the market where XETV or KNXV could not be carried. In 1995, KECY picked up a secondary affiliation with UPN and carried the network until 2006.

In March 1997, Pacific Media Corporation signed a local marketing/time brokerage agreement (LMA/TBA) with Growth Cities Broadcasting, LLC (a subsidiary of Beverly Hills, California-based Lambert Broadcasting, LLC). This gave Growth Cities programming and operations control of KECY and Palm Springs LPTV stations K40DB, K20CB and K77AV, with an option to purchase the stations. The agreement took effect May 1, 1997, and was to continue until April 30, 2008, or until Growth Cities exercised its purchase option. The following month, Growth Cities transferred the LMA/TBA to News Press & Gazette Co. (NPG), which by this time owned KESQ-TV in Palm Springs, reuniting the two stations under common control.

In February 2002, KECY announced that after more than 30 years in El Centro, it would be moving its operations to Yuma, effective April 1. The station's general manager cited interference to its microwave signal from the studio to the broadcast tower on Black Mountain, due to sand in the air from the Glamis dunes, which lie between El Centro and Black Mountain. In September 2006, KECY added a secondary MyNetworkTV affiliation on its main channel from 9 to 11 p.m. after Fox primetime programming on weeknights (as well as from 11:30 p.m. to 1:30 a.m. on Saturdays until MyNetworkTV dropped its Saturday lineup in September 2009); in March 2012, KECY moved MyNetworkTV programming an hour later in preparation for the launch of its local newscasts.

The ABC network returned to the Yuma–El Centro market on January 1, 2007, when KECY launched a full-time affiliate on a new digital subchannel and on Time Warner Cable channel 5, replacing Phoenix affiliate KNXV-TV in Yuma, and San Diego's KGTV (which had been seen on cable channel 10) in California. In November 2007, with time running out on the local marketing agreement, NPG moved to buy KECY and KDFX-CA (K77AV ceased operations in April 1998) for $2 million, and the FCC approved the sale in May 2008.

KECY began broadcasting in high definition in early 2009 – the first station in the market to upgrade – and broadcasts Fox prime time and Fox Sports in high definition. The CW affiliation moved from KSWT to KECY in March 2010, and KECY placed the network on channel 9.3, moving KESE-LP to 9.4. The station also began airing The CW's programming in the early prime time schedule, beginning at 7 p.m., like other affiliates in the Mountain Time Zone. DirecTV contributed around $1 million in technology and fiber optics in early 2011 to provide KECY a direct link to DirecTV's facilities in Los Angeles, allowing KECY to send high definition content to DirecTV, and DirecTV to send KECY's signal to subscribers in the Yuma/El Centro market.

On July 2, 2014, NPG announced that it had agreed to form a resource sharing agreement with Blackhawk Broadcasting, owner of KSWT and KYMA-DT, giving NPG control of the big four television network affiliates in the Yuma–El Centro market. All employees of KSWT and KYMA, except for sales personnel, became employees of NPG. Blackhawk continues to operate the sales departments of its stations. As a result of the agreement, KSWT and KYMA relocated to KECY's building on 4th Avenue.

=== Terrestrial HD distribution of KECY-DT2, KECY-DT3, and KECY-DT4/KESE-LP ===
By November 2017, the over-the-air feed of "ABC 5" had been upgraded into 720p HD, after previously being offered in a 16:9 standard definition widescreen picture format. At that time, the over-the-air feed of "Desert CW6" was unable to be upgraded into 720p HD, most likely due to bandwidth limitations prohibiting KECY from transmitting three of their feeds in 720p HD simultaneously while also simulcasting KESE-LP "Telemundo 3" as a fourth subchannel; however, "Desert CW6" was instead upgraded into a widescreen SD picture format, after previously being offered in 480i 4:3. Ever since an upgrade to their multiplexer equipment sometime in November 2019, the over-the-air feed of "Desert CW6" has been broadcasting in 720p HD over-the-air; meanwhile, the simulcast of KESE-LP on KECY-DT4 was upgraded to 1080i full HD.

== News operation ==
While affiliated with CBS, it operated a news department which ended sometime in the early 1990s. At the time of the shutdown of the original news operation, its newscasts were titled News 9. On November 20, 2011, News-Press & Gazette announced it would re-establish a news operation for KECY, its ABC-affiliated second digital subchannel, and Telemundo outlet KESE by March 2012.

The production officially launched on March 23, 2012, airing in full high definition, making KECY the first television outlet in the market to offer HD local news programming. The station's Fox-affiliated main channel airs a half-hour 9 p.m. newscast each weeknight; the ABC subchannel KECY-DT2 airs its own local newscasts (branded as ABC 5 News) each weeknight at 6 and 10 p.m., while KESE offers Spanish-language regional news from sister station KUNA-LD in Palm Desert each weeknight at 5 and 10.

All local news offerings are produced live except for the 10 p.m. broadcast for KESE, which is taped earlier in the evening to allow KECY-DT2 to air a live newscast at the same time. The station's broadcasts originate from a specially designed virtual set at its main studios, which can be tailored to the specific network channel that the local newscast is aired on. There are no weather or sports personalities based out of this station's facility and the news team currently consists of five personalities. Taped weather forecasts originating from sister station KVIA-TV in El Paso, Texas are inserted into each local broadcast.

With the launch of this news department, KECY became the first Fox affiliate in News-Press & Gazette's portfolio to have its newscasts produced in-house.

Following the relocations of KSWT and KYMA-DT to the KECY building, all three stations largely retained their current newscast times (though KECY general manager Paul Heebink has stated that KECY-DT2 may reschedule its newscasts) and separate news branding, though they share reporters. To accommodate the production of simultaneous newscasts, additional studios were constructed, featuring virtual sets similar to what was already used for KECY's newscasts; NPG also intended to expand the stations' news staff. Subsequent to the relocation, KYMA-DT newscasts are now simulcast on KECY-DT2 and a separate newscast for ABC5 News is no longer offered.

== Technical information ==
=== Subchannels ===
The station's signal is multiplexed:

Subchannels of KECY-TV
Subchannel	Res.	Short name	Programming
9.1	720p	KECY-DT	Fox & MyNetworkTV
9.2	720p	ABC5	ABC
9.3	720p	CW6	The CW Plus
9.4	1080i	KESE	Telemundo (KESE-LD)
9.5	480i	Nosey	Nosey
9.6	480i	Confess	Confess

Simulcast of subchannels of another station

=== Analog-to-digital conversion ===
KECY-TV shut down its analog signal, over VHF channel 9, on June 12, 2009, the official date on which full-power television stations in the United States transitioned from analog to digital broadcasts under federal mandate. The station's digital signal relocated from its pre-transition UHF channel 48 to VHF channel 9 for post-transition operations.

=== Translators ===
KECY formerly operated two translator stations: K48NG-D in Imperial Valley and K14PI-D in Desert Center, California. However, as of 2019, both translators are no longer in operation.

== See also ==
- Channel 5 branded TV stations in the United States
- Channel 6 branded TV stations in the United States
- Channel 9 digital TV stations in the United States
- Channel 9 virtual TV stations in the United States
