= KYMA-DT =

Television station in Yuma, Arizona

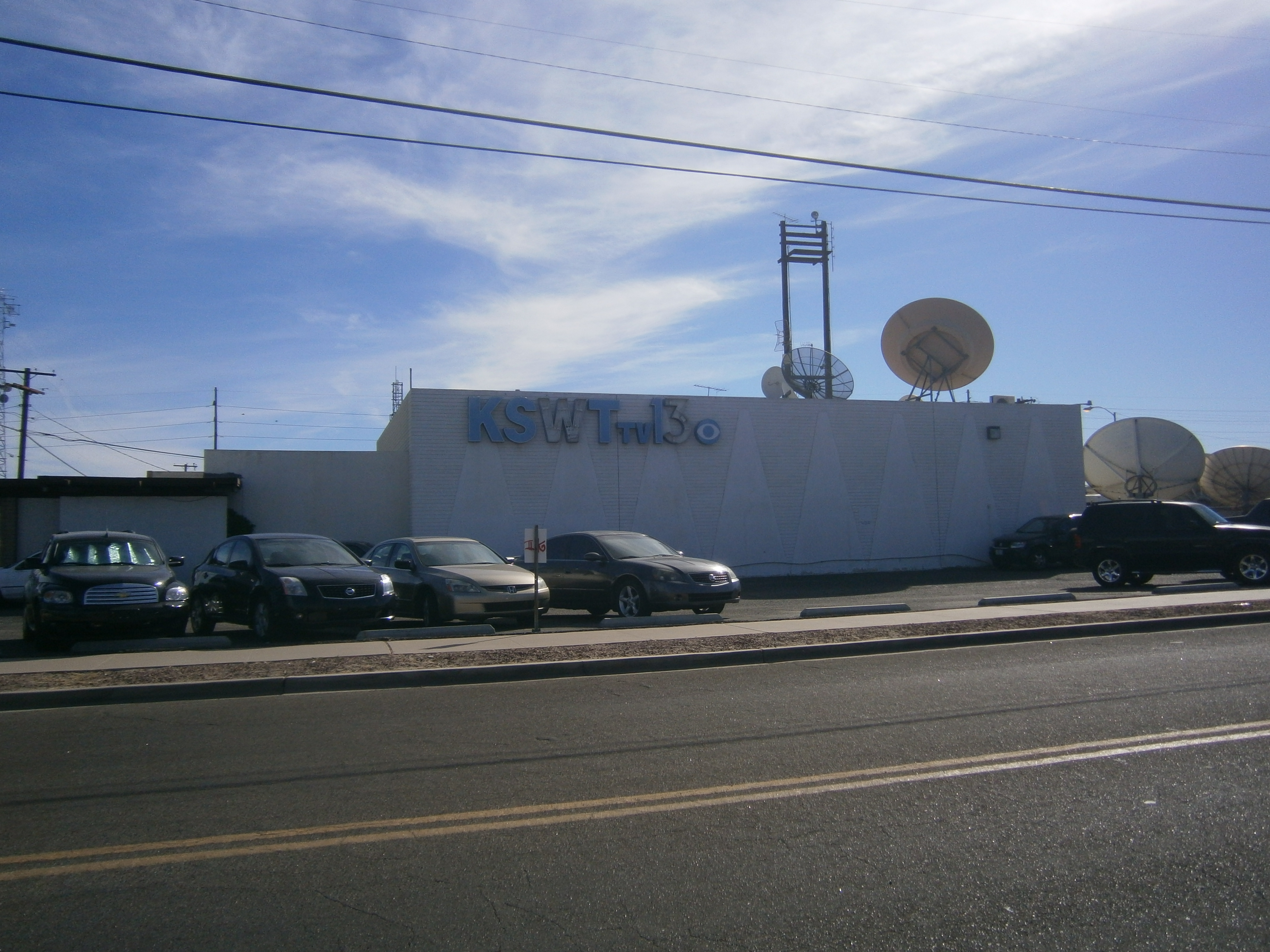
- Offices of KSWT
- Yuma, Arizona; El Centro, California; United States
- City: Yuma, Arizona
- Channels: Digital: 13 (VHF); Virtual: 11, 13
- Branding: NBC 11; News 11; CBS 13; 13 On Your Side

Programming
- Affiliations: 11.1: NBC; 13.1: CBS; for others, see § Subchannels

Ownership
- Owner: Standard Media; (Community News Media LLC)
- Operator: News-Press & Gazette Company
- Sister stations: KECY-TV, KESE-LD

History
- Founded: July 23, 1962
- First air date: December 2, 1963
- Former call signs: KBLU-TV (1963–1978); KYEL-TV (1978–1991); KSWT (1991–2020)
- Former channel numbers: Analog: 13 (VHF, 1963–2009); Digital: 16 (UHF, until 2009)
- Former affiliations: CBS (1963–1970); NBC (1970–1991); ABC (1991–1994); Telemundo (secondary, 1990s–2000); Pax (secondary, 2000–2004)
- Call sign meaning: Yuma (carried over from the original KYMA-DT)

Technical information
- Licensing authority: FCC
- Facility ID: 33639
- ERP: 50 kW
- HAAT: 480 m (1,575 ft)
- Transmitter coordinates: 33°3′18.5″N 114°49′41.6″W

Links
- Public license information: Public file; LMS
- Website: kyma.com

KYMA-DT (channels 11 and 13) is a television station licensed to Yuma, Arizona, United States, serving the Yuma, Arizona–El Centro, California market as an affiliate of CBS and NBC. It is owned by Standard Media and operated by News-Press & Gazette Company, owner of Fox/ABC/CW+ affiliate KECY-TV (channel 9) and low-power Telemundo affiliate KESE-LD (channel 35). The three stations share studios on South 4th Avenue in downtown Yuma, with an advertising sales office on West Main Street in El Centro; KYMA-DT's transmitter is located northwest of Yuma.

The current KYMA-DT, which operated as KSWT from 1991 to 2020, is the result of the merger of the program streams on co-owned KSWT and the former KYMA-DT, which was required as a condition of their acquisition by Apollo Global Management in 2019.

== History ==
=== KBLU-TV ===
When the Federal Communications Commission (FCC) lifted the freeze on new television station applications in 1952, they allocated VHF channels 11 and 13 for broadcast television service in Yuma. Valley Telecasting quickly applied for and opened KIVA on channel 11, becoming the city's first television station in October 1953. Wrather-Alvarez Broadcasting, owners of KFMB-TV in San Diego, followed with a January 1956 application to build KYAT on channel 13, but failed, and in September 1958, the construction permit was dismissed. By November 1961, more than eight years after the arrival of local television, Yuma was still a one-station town.

In November 1961, Robert Crites, owner and manager of local CBS-affiliated radio station KBLU, formed a partnership, called Desert Telecasting, and applied to the FCC on November 30, 1961, for a construction permit to build a station on channel 13. New England Industries had filed a competing application for the same channel nearly a month earlier, but on July 23, 1962, the FCC granted the construction permit to Desert Telecasting, and KBLU came into existence, to be the market's CBS television affiliate. It would not be an easy road to sign-on, as Bruce Merrill, owner of both KIVA and the local cable television system, was convinced that the market could not support a second local television station and fought to keep the new station from opening. Merrill opposed a KBLU-TV partnership restructure, an extension of time to construct the station, and a proposal to increase power, then, in September 1963, filed a "motion to stay" to prevent KBLU-TV from building its facilities. All of Merrill's petitions were denied, and on the evening of December 2, 1963, one hour after receiving notice of program test authority, KBLU-TV began broadcasting.

The station expanded its coverage to El Centro in 1965 with another increase in power, and relocation of its transmitter from within the city of Yuma to a site atop Black Mountain, 28 miles (45 km) northwest of Yuma, at a much greater height above average terrain. It also opened an office and studio in El Centro to better serve the Imperial Valley. On December 7, 1966, Desert Telecasting filed an application to transfer the stations to Eller Telecasting, part of Eller Outdoor Advertising Company. Ownership of the station would pass to Karl Eller, but the station would continue to be managed by Crites, who became president of Eller Telecasting. KBLU-TV became part of Combined Communications in 1968, when its parent, Eller Outdoor Advertising Company, merged with KTAR Broadcasting Company.

The sudden demise of KIVA on January 31, 1970, spelled more changes for KBLU-TV, which immediately moved to acquire the NBC affiliation, while the CBS affiliation passed to new station KECC-TV (now sister station KECY-TV). KBLU-TV also took over the television studio facilities formerly occupied by KIVA.

In July 1977, Combined Communications announced that it was selling both radio station KBLU and TV station KBLU-TV, but to different owners. The TV station would keep its NBC affiliation, but was to be sold to Chapman Television of Tuscaloosa, effective January 1, 1978, pending FCC approval. As FCC rules in effect at the time prohibited two stations to share call letters unless commonly-owned, and the radio station was keeping the KBLU call letters, Chapman requested the call sign KYEL-TV (for Yuma and El Centro). The call sign was found to be in use, but it was on a ship which had not been in service since 1803. The FCC approved the sale on November 1, 1977, and on January 1, 1978, KBLU-TV became KYEL-TV.

=== KYEL-TV/KSWT ===
Chapman Television did not keep the station long, selling it to Service Broadcasters, Inc. in November 1978, who, in turn, sold it to Beam Broadcasters in November 1983 (later known as Beacon Broadcasters). It remained an NBC affiliate until KYMA took the affiliation on February 1, 1991. KYEL-TV took the ABC affiliation previously held by KYMA; the station became one of a few handful of TV stations to have held an affiliation with all of the "Big Three" networks in its history. In September 1991, Beacon Broadcasters sold the station to KB Media, who promptly renamed the station KSWT (for the Southwest Triangle, reflecting the triangular shape between the cities of Yuma, El Centro and Mexicali, Baja California) on September 13.

In September 1994, CBS affiliate KECY-TV flipped to Fox, and KSWT took over the CBS affiliation once again; this left Yuma without an ABC affiliate until KECY launched an ABC-affiliated subchannel in January 2007. For the twelve years and four months after KECY gained the Fox affiliation, ABC programming was provided on cable via San Diego affiliate KGTV (which was carried on cable systems in southeastern California) and Phoenix affiliate KNXV-TV (which had been carried on cable systems in west-central Arizona dating back to its time as a Fox affiliate).

In February 1998, KB Media sold the station to Eclipse Media, and then in September 2000, Eclipse Media sold the station to Pappas Telecasting. KSWT also included Telemundo programming during the overnight hours in the 1990s, until local affiliate KESE-LP began operations. KSWT aired some Pax programming during afternoons beginning in 2000, but had reverted to full-time CBS by 2004.

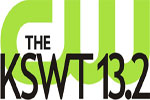
Logo for KSWT-DT2 as a CW affiliate.

In September 2006, The CW network launched nationwide, and KSWT added the network as a digital subchannel on 13.2. Adding the subchannel soon became a problem, as Time Warner Cable, the dominant local cable provider, placed CW programming on channel 740, in a costlier digital cable package. KSWT requested that the channel be placed in the basic package on channel 6, where the market's cable-only WB affiliate, branded KWUB, had resided.

After several months of negotiations, the differences were settled, and in December 2006, KSWT digital subchannel 13.2 was placed on cable channel 6. In 2010, The CW moved to KECY's third digital subchannel, which inherited KSWT-DT2's cable carriage; KSWT replaced CW programming with a standard definition simulcast of its main programming; and 13.2 went dark.

In July 2013, Pappas filed to sell KSWT to Blackhawk Broadcasting, a company that shared ownership with the Northwest Broadcasting group. The deal required a failing station waiver, as Blackhawk concurrently acquired KYMA-DT from Intermountain West Communications Company. The FCC granted the KSWT failed waiver request on December 23. It previously approved the KYMA transaction earlier on August 12. The sale of both stations was completed on February 18, 2014.

On July 2, 2014, News-Press & Gazette Company (NPG), owners of KECY-TV and KESE-LP, announced that it had agreed to form a resource sharing agreement with Blackhawk Broadcasting, giving NPG control of the Big Four television network affiliates in the Yuma–El Centro market. All employees of KSWT and KYMA-DT, except for sales personnel, became employees of NPG. Blackhawk continues to operate the sales departments of its stations. As a result of the agreement, KSWT and KYMA relocated to KECY's building on 4th Avenue.

=== Consolidation with KYMA-DT ===
In 2019, Apollo Global Management acquired Northwest Broadcasting and Cox Media Group in acquisitions worth a combined $3.1 billion. The parties were required, after a court ruling annulled changes in media ownership rules, to condition the transaction on the divestiture of one of the two licenses that Northwest held in two markets: Syracuse and Yuma, which would be done by surrender. On January 13, 2020, the two stations switched call letters, with KSWT becoming KYMA-DT and the KYMA-DT license, selected for surrender, becoming KSWT. The KSWT call letters were also removed from all branding collateral for the CBS subchannel. Additionally, KYMA's subchannels were added to the channel 13 multiplex; the station warned antenna viewers to rescan by January 17 to continue receiving all services.

On March 29, 2022, Cox Media Group announced it would sell KYMA-DT and 17 other stations to Imagicomm Communications, an affiliate of the parent company of the INSP cable channel, for $488 million; the sale was completed on August 1.

=== Acquisitions by Rincon and Standard Media ===
On April 3, 2025, Imagicomm announced that it would sell seven stations, including KYMA-DT, to Todd Parkin's Rincon Broadcasting Group; the deal was consummated on July 18. In March 2026, Community News Media LLC, which operates as Standard Media Group and is led by Soohyung Kim with Deborah McDermott as chief executive, agreed to acquire Rincon Broadcasting's stations, including KYMA-DT, for $116.5 million; the sale was completed on October 1.

== News operation ==
The CBS and NBC subchannels air separate newscasts at different times, retaining separate branding as they have since NPG took over operation of the then-Blackhawk stations.

On weekdays, the NBC subchannel airs an hour-long morning newscast at 6 a.m., as well as half-hour newscasts at 5, 6 and 10 p.m. titled News 11, as well as weekend early evening and late newscasts.

The CBS subchannel does not offer a live morning newscast; instead, it airs two hour-long evening newscasts at 4 and 6 p.m., and a 10 p.m. newscast, all titled 13 On Your Side. Its only weekend newscasts air at 10 p.m.

=== Notable former on-air staff ===
- Lou Dobbs – anchor/reporter
- Trace Gallagher – reporter (1980s)
- Fred Roggin – sports anchor/reporter (1977–1978)

== Technical information ==
=== Subchannels ===
The station's signal is multiplexed:

Subchannels of KYMA-DT
Subchannel	Res.	Short name	Programming
11.1	1080i	NBC-11	NBC
13.1	1080i	CBS-13	CBS
13.3	480i	KYMA-3	Estrella TV (4:3)
13.4	480i	KYMAION	Ion (4:3)

When the channel 11 multiplex was shut down, its subchannels of NBC and Ion Television moved to the channel 13 transmitter as subchannels 11.1 and 13.4.

=== Analog-to-digital conversion ===
KSWT shut down its analog signal, over VHF channel 13, on June 12, 2009, the official date on which full-power television stations in the United States transitioned from analog to digital broadcasts under federal mandate. The station's digital signal relocated from its pre-transition UHF channel 16 to VHF channel 13 for post-transition operations.

=== Former rebroadcasters ===
Both programming streams of then-KSWT had been rebroadcast on stations licensed to Wellton-Mohawk, Arizona, until the translator stations' licensee, Wellton-Mohawk Irrigation & Drainage District, shut down the stations on August 18, 2009.

== See also ==
- Channel 11 branded TV stations in the United States
- Channel 13 digital TV stations in the United States
- Channel 13 virtual TV stations in the United States
