= KESE-LD =

Television station in Yuma, Arizona

- Yuma, Arizona; El Centro, California; United States
- City: Yuma, Arizona
- Channels: Digital: 35 (UHF); Virtual: 35
- Branding: Telemundo 3 (cable channel)

Programming
- Affiliations: 35.1: Telemundo

Ownership
- Owner: News-Press & Gazette Company; (NPG of Yuma-El Centro, LLC)
- Sister stations: KECY-TV, KYMA-DT

History
- First air date: October 24, 1997
- Former call signs: K35EX (1997–2000); KESE-LP (2000–2021)
- Former channel numbers: Analog: 35 (UHF, 2001–2021)

Technical information
- Licensing authority: FCC
- Facility ID: 19781
- Class: LD
- ERP: 8 kW
- HAAT: 83.5 m (274 ft)
- Transmitter coordinates: 32°38′31″N 114°33′37″W
- Translator(s): KECY-TV 9.4 El Centro, CA

Links
- Public license information: LMS
- Website: kyma.com/noticias-3/

KESE-LD (channel 35, cable channel 3) is a low-power television station licensed to Yuma, Arizona, United States, serving the Yuma, Arizona–El Centro, California market as an affiliate of the Spanish-language network Telemundo. It is owned by the News-Press & Gazette Company alongside Fox/ABC/CW+ affiliate KECY-TV (channel 9), and is co-managed with dual CBS/NBC affiliate KYMA-DT (channel 13). The three stations share studios on South 4th Avenue in downtown Yuma, with an advertising sales office on West Main Street in El Centro; KESE-LD's transmitter is located southeast of Yuma.

== History ==
The station signed on in October 1997 as the first full-time Telemundo outlet for the Yuma–El Centro market. Prior to the sign-on of the station, KSWT (now KYMA-DT) had a secondary affiliation with Telemundo, carrying some of the network's programs in the late night hours; the full Telemundo schedule could only be viewed over-the-air in western portions of the California side of the market via San Diego/Tijuana affiliate XHAS-TV (now a Canal 66 affiliate) or on some cable providers in the area via the network's national feed.

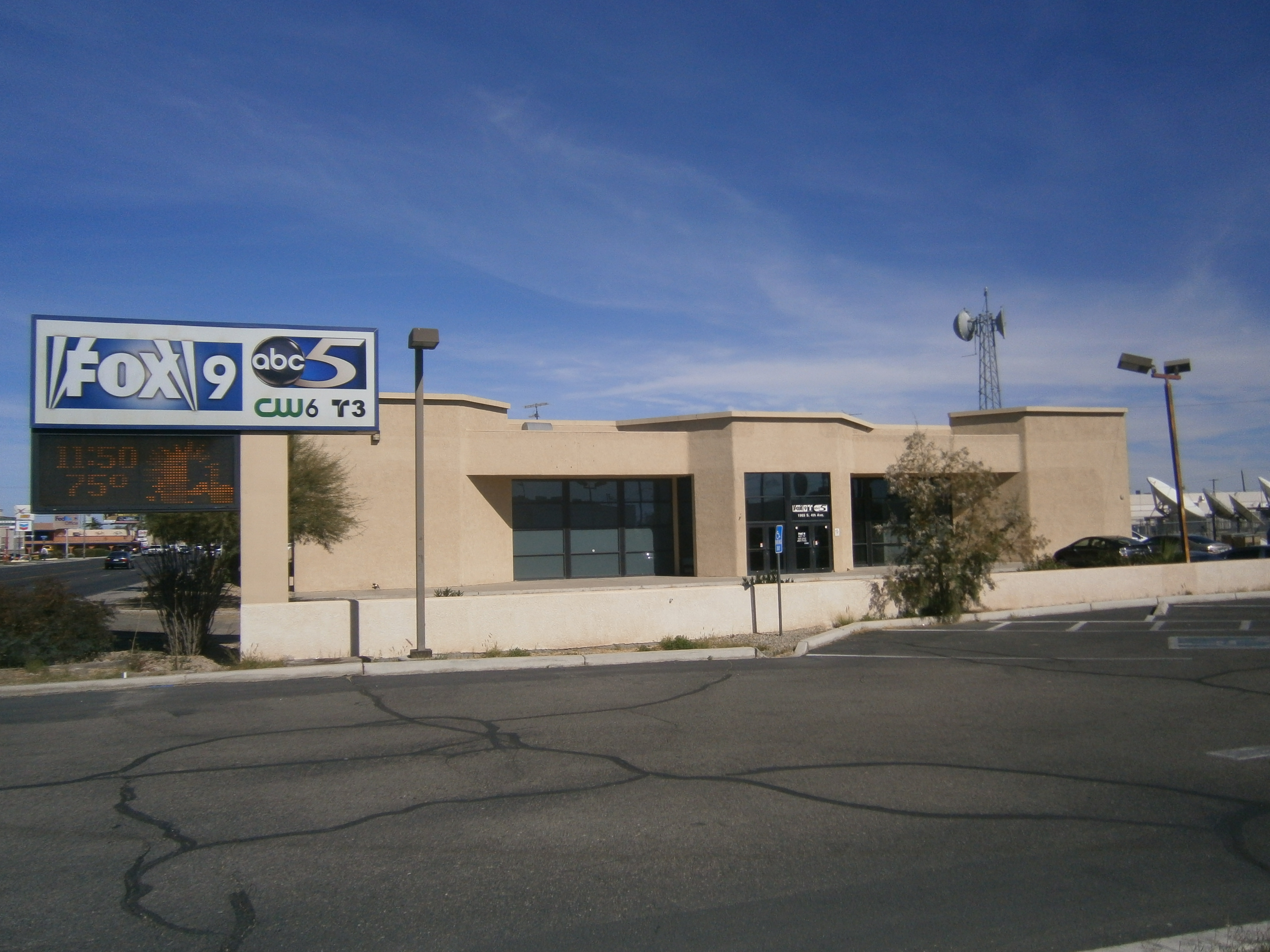
Offices of KESE

The station began with an original construction permit granted on October 24, 1997. The station was assigned the callsign K35EX and was owned by Estrella License Corporation. Gulf-California Broadcast Company acquired the station in October 2000, applied for a station license in November, and changed the station's callsign to KESE-LP in December. The Federal Communications Commission (FCC) granted the station a license on February 2, 2001.

== Technical information ==
=== Subchannel ===
Subchannel of KESE-LD
Subchannel	Res.	Short name	Programming
35.1	1080i	KESE	Telemundo

=== Analog-to-digital conversion ===
In September 2006, KESE-LP was identified as a singleton applicant for a companion digital LPTV signal on UHF Channel 40. A singleton applicant was one whose application for a construction permit had no competition from nearby applications on the same or adjacent channels. As a singleton applicant, the station is likely to be granted a construction permit. Currently, KESE-LP can be seen (in 1080i full high definition) on KECY's digital subchannel 9.4, a full power station.

On April 19, 2021, KESE-LP was licensed for digital operation on channel 35, changing its call sign to KESE-LD.

== See also ==
- Channel 3 branded TV stations in the United States
- Channel 35 low-power TV stations in the United States
- Channel 35 digital TV stations in the United States
