= Channel 35 TV stations in Canada =

The following television stations broadcast on digital or analog channel 35 in Canada:

- CFJP-DT in Montreal, Quebec
- CFTO-DT-54 in Peterborough, Ontario
- CHCJ-DT in Hamilton, Ontario
- CIIT-DT in Winnipeg, Manitoba
- CIMT-DT-7 in Les Escoumins, Quebec
- CIVK-DT-3 in Gaspé, Quebec
- CKRT-DT-5 in Saint-Urbain, Quebec
