= KEET =

Television station in Eureka, California

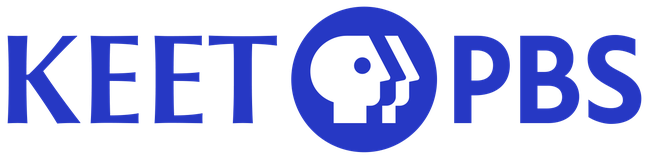
- Eureka, California; United States
- Channels: Digital: 11 (VHF); Virtual: 13
- Branding: KEET PBS

Programming
- Affiliations: 13.1: PBS

Ownership
- Owner: Redwood Empire Public Television, Inc.

History
- Founded: 1969
- First air date: April 14, 1969
- Former call signs: KRWE-TV (CP, 1967)
- Former channel numbers: Analog: 13 (VHF, 1969–2009)
- Former affiliations: NET (1969–1970)
- Call sign meaning: Eureka Educational Television

Technical information
- Licensing authority: FCC
- Facility ID: 55435
- ERP: 38.2 kW
- HAAT: 551.2 m (1,808 ft)
- Transmitter coordinates: 40°43′41.9″N 123°58′21.5″W
- Translator(s): see § Translators

Links
- Public license information: Public file; LMS
- Website: www.keet.org

KEET (channel 13) is a PBS member television station in Eureka, California, United States. Founded in 1969, the station is owned by Redwood Empire Public Television, Inc. KEET's studios are located on Humboldt Hill Road in Eureka, and its transmitter is located along Barry Road southeast of the city.

On September 15, 2025, it was announced that KEET would discontinue programming on its subchannels beginning in October, opting to focus on its main channel after the loss of 50% of its federal grant funding, which in fiscal year 2024 was $862,900 of taxpayer funds from the Corporation for Public Broadcasting.

In mid-2025, the station had seven employees.

== Technical information ==
=== Subchannel ===
Subchannel of KEET
Subchannel	Res.	Short name	Programming
13.1	1080i	KEET HD	PBS

=== Analog-to-digital conversion ===
KEET shut down its analog signal, over VHF channel 13, on February 17, 2009, the original target date on which full-power television stations in the United States were to transition from analog to digital broadcasts under federal mandate (which was later pushed back to June 12, 2009). The station's digital signal remained on its pre-transition VHF channel 11, using virtual channel 13.

=== Translators ===
- K23NI-D Crescent City
- KEET (DRT) 24 Fortuna
- KEET (DRT) 8 Hoopa
