= Channel 35 TV stations in Mexico =

The following television stations broadcast on digital channel 35 in Mexico:

- XEDK-TDT in Guadalajara, Jalisco
- XEJ-TDT in Ciudad Juárez, Chihuahua
- XELN-TDT in Torreón, Coahuila de Zaragoza
- XHAG-TDT in Aguascalientes, Aguascalientes
- XHATO-TDT in Guanajuato, Guanajuato
- XHATV-TDT in Santiago Tuxtla, Veracruz
- XHBK-TDT in Ciudad Obregón, Sonora
- XHBVT-TDT in San Buenaventura, Chihuahua
- XHCPCS-TDT in Cabo San Lucas, Baja California Sur
- XHCTNL-TDT in Nuevo Laredo, Tamaulipas
- XHDLG-TDT in Dolores Hidalgo, Guanajuato
- XHDO-TDT in Culiacán, Sinaloa
- XHDZ-TDT in Comitán de Domínguez, Chiapas
- XHGAC-TDT in Acámbaro, Guanajuato
- XHGHU-TDT in Huanímaro, Guanajuato
- XHGJR-TDT in Santa Cruz de Juventino Rosas, Guanajuato
- XHGMV-TDT in Santiago Maravatio, Guanajuato
- XHGN-TDT in Ciudad del Carmen, Campeche
- XHHCG-TDT in Chilpancingo, Guerrero
- XHIH-TDT in Tehuantepec, Oaxaca
- XHLUC-TDT in Jocotitlan, México
- XHMEN-TDT in Mérida, Yucatán
- XHMNU-TDT in Monterrey, Nuevo León
- XHMOT-TDT in Monclova, Coahuila
- XHPVE-TDT in Puerto Vallarta, Jalisco
- XHRSO-TDT in Rosario, Sonora
- XHSLS-TDT in San Luis Potosí, San Luis Potosí
- XHSPROA-TDT in Oaxaca, Oaxaca
- XHSPRTA-TDT in Tampico, Tamaulipas
- XHSPRXA-TDT in Xalapa, Veracruz
- XHSVT-TDT in Caborca, Sonora
- XHSYO-TDT in Soyopa, Sonora
- XHUJAT-TDT in Villahermosa, Tabasco
- XHWDT-TDT in Ciudad Allende, Coahuila
