= WPXS =

Television station in Mount Vernon, Illinois

WPXS and KUMO-LD
WPXS: Mount Vernon, Illinois; KUMO-LD: St. Louis, Missouri; United States
- Channels for WPXS: Digital: 13 (VHF); Virtual: 13
- Channels for KUMO-LD: Digital: 32 (UHF); Virtual: 51

Programming
- Affiliations: 13.1/51.1: Daystar; for others, see § Subchannels

Ownership
- Owner: Daystar Television Network; (Word of God Fellowship, Inc.)

History
- First air date: WPXS: February 28, 1983
- Former call signs: WPXS: WCEE (1983–1998); KUMO-LD: K07TV (1983–1997); K40FF (1997–2004); KUMO-LP (2004–2011)
- Former channel number: WPXS: Analog: 13 (VHF, 1983–2009); Digital: 21 (UHF, until 2020); KUMO-LD: Analog: 7 (VHF, 1983–1997), 40 (UHF, 1997–1999), 51 (UHF, 1999–2011); Digital: 51 (UHF, 2011–2018)
- Former affiliations: WPXS: Independent (1983–1998); Pax/i/Ion (1998–2004); Daystar (2004–2005); Retro TV (2005–2010)
- Call sign meaning: WPXS: Pax Southern Illinois; -or-; Pax St. Louis (after former owner and network affiliation)

Technical information
- Licensing authority: FCC
- Facility ID: WPXS: 40861; KUMO-LD: 10291
- Class: KUMO-LD: LD
- ERP: WPXS: 160 kW; KUMO-LD: 15 kW
- HAAT: WPXS: 163 m (535 ft); KUMO-LD: 256.2 m (841 ft)
- Transmitter coordinates: WPXS: 38°21′53.6″N 89°53′23.5″W; KUMO-LD: 38°34′27.9″N 90°19′31.9″W

Links
- Public license information: WPXS: Public file; LMS; KUMO-LD: Public file; LMS

WPXS (channel 13) is a religious television station licensed to Mount Vernon, Illinois, United States, serving the St. Louis area. The station is owned by the Daystar Television Network. WPXS's transmitter is located on Five Forks Road near New Athens, Illinois. Although Mount Vernon is part of the Paducah, Kentucky–Cape Girardeau, Missouri–Harrisburg, Illinois television market, WPXS is assigned by Nielsen to the larger St. Louis market.

== History ==
=== Southern Illinois's independent ===
Channel 13 at Mount Vernon—the last VHF television allocation in southern Illinois, added in 1970 after a years-long fight that depleted the resources of the aspiring station owners—emerged as a bone of contention when the Southern Illinois Broadcasting Corporation, a subsidiary of Evans Broadcasting, was granted a construction permit in 1979. Southern Illinois Broadcasting had been one of three competing applicants for the channel, alongside a group of local businessmen and Bill Varecha, owner of Murphysboro radio station WTAO, under the name Pyramid Broadcasting Corporation. Evans fueled a prolonged legal fight that prompted Varecha to reach a settlement agreement. However, opposition arose because Evans Broadcasting owned St. Louis independent station KDNL-TV and intended for channel 13 to repeat it 95 percent of the time. A local landowner who owned a strategically located parcel that Evans considered for the transmitter refused to lease it. The landowner and others formed the Citizens Committee for Independent Local Television in Southern Illinois to oppose the grant of the permit. Evans argued that Mount Vernon, a town with a population of 18,000, could not sustain the station, and that national advertising revenues would be poor since the station would be located in the St. Louis market without covering St. Louis.

Evans pressed ahead despite the opposition. It had segments of a 1,000 ft (300 m) tower waiting at a site near Salem when the Federal Communications Commission (FCC), responding to the Citizens Committee's appeals, rescinded the grant of the permit. In early 1980, however, it sold KDNL-TV and announced it was pulling out of contention for channel 13, saying it wanted to avoid "years of litigation". The Pyramid application was reinstated in 1981, and in June 1982, the FCC granted it a construction permit.

WCEE, known on air as "C-13", began broadcasting February 28, 1983. Its program schedule heavily emphasized programming of interest to southern Illinois viewers that St. Louis stations did not offer; channel 13 aired the Chicago White Sox, Chicago Cubs, and Illinois high school and college sports, and it started a local news department. After operating the station for nearly three years, Pyramid sold WCEE to Sudbrink Broadcasting for $3.6 million in late 1985. The sale of the station, which was struggling with cable carriage but financially successful, raised capital for Varecha to build television stations in Melbourne, Florida, and Paducah, Kentucky; it also marked Sudbrink's first television property.

Under Sudbrink, the station remained an independent airing programming oriented to southern Illinois. In 1994, WCEE was purchased by McEntee Broadcasting for $1.475 million.

=== Pax years ===
Earlier possible non-broadcast logo.

Christian Network, a company backed by Lowell Paxson, bought WCEE from McEntee in 1995 for $3.2 million, representing a doubling of the purchase price McEntee had paid just a year prior. A year later, WCEE and three other Christian Network stations were sold to Paxson Communications—the forerunner of Ion Media Networks—for $18.3 million.

As part of the launch of the Pax TV network in 1998, WCEE became the designated St. Louis station. It changed its call sign to the current WPXS and began simulcasting on a translator in St. Louis, KUMO-LP (channel 40, later 51). The WPXS transmitter, which was located north of Kell, Illinois, was close enough to St. Louis to cover most of the Illinois portion of the St. Louis market; St. Louis itself was served by KUMO-LP.

=== Equity and Daystar ===
In 2004, the station affiliated with the Daystar religious network. The following year, Equity Broadcasting bought the station from Paxson; WPXS subsequently rejoined Pax (which rebranded as i: Independent Television that summer, and then to Ion Television in 2007).

In 2005, WPXS affiliated with the Retro Television Network, a network owned by Equity at the time. By this time, the bulk of the station's audience was located in St. Louis. In 2010, Daystar purchased WPXS outright; this resulted in the station switching back to the network on August 12 of that year. With that move, DirecTV pulled WPXS from its St. Louis local station lineup on September 11, 2010, as WPXS had become a straight simulcast of Daystar's national feed.

== Technical information ==
=== Subchannels ===
The station's signal is multiplexed:

Subchannels of WPXS
Subchannel	Res.	Short name	Programming
13.1	1080i	WPXS-DT	Daystar
13.2	480i	RETRO	Retro TV (4:3)
13.3	720p	WPXS-ES	Daystar Español
13.4	480i	WPXS-SD	Daystar Reflections

Subchannels of KUMO-LD
Subchannel	Res.	Short name	Programming
51.1	720p	KUMO	Daystar
51.2	480i	D-Latin	Daystar Español
51.3	480i	Retro	Retro TV (4:3)

=== Analog-to-digital conversion ===
WPXS opted to build its digital transmitter in Saint Rose, Illinois, which is part of the St. Louis market. The station shut down its analog signal, over VHF channel 13, on April 30, 2009. The station's digital signal continued to broadcast on its pre-transition UHF channel 21, using virtual channel 13.

The station's signal now covered areas of the St. Louis market east of the Mississippi River, including Belleville, Edwardsville and Alton, Illinois. After the switchover, the broadcast radius of WPXS's digital signal covered a smaller area than the former analog signal, resulting in the loss of the station's reception to nearly 93,000 viewers in Effingham, Clay and Wayne counties and large portions of Franklin, Hamilton, Jefferson, Jasper, Richland and Shelby counties in Illinois. KUMO-LD flash-cut its digital signal into operation in June 2011, without an RTV subchannel. Although WPXS's digital transmitter created redundancies with KUMO-LP on the Illinois side of the St. Louis market, the transmitter still provided only rimshot coverage of the Missouri side of the market, most likely due to the need to protect the transmitter of KRCG in Jefferson City on nearby digital channel 12.
