= WOTM-LD =

Television station in Birmingham, Alabama

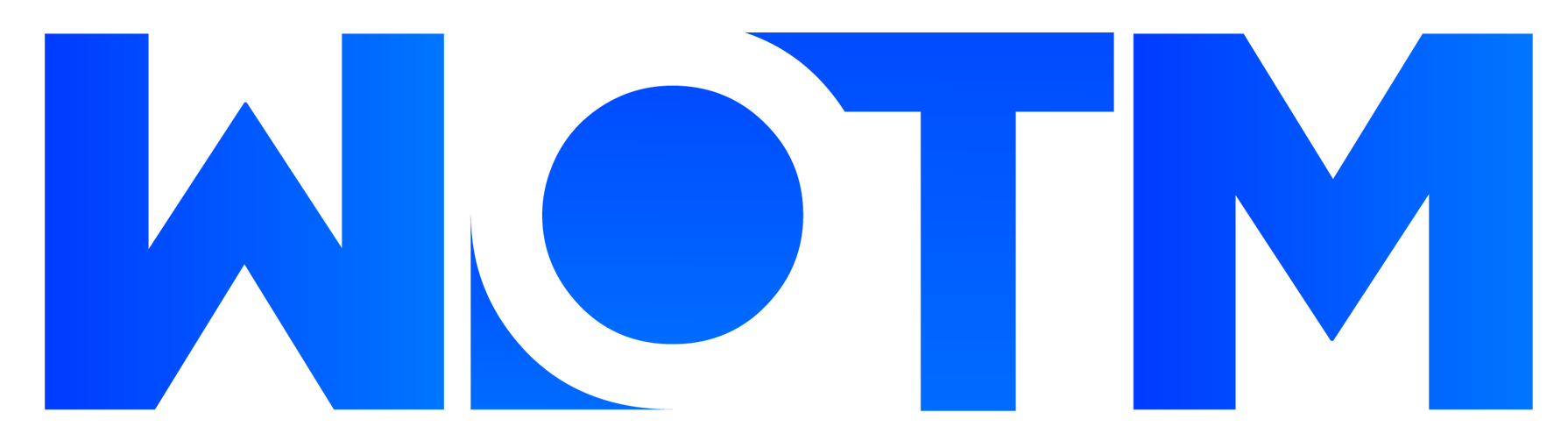

Birmingham, Alabama; United States
- Channels: Digital: 35 (UHF); Virtual: 19

Programming
- Affiliations: 19.1: Independent

Ownership
- Owner: Broadway Communications, LLC
- Sister stations: WOIL-CD

History
- Founded: November 15, 1996
- Former call signs: W19CB (1996–2000); WOTM-LP (2000–2015)

Technical information
- Licensing authority: FCC
- Facility ID: 64339
- Class: LD
- ERP: 4.8 kW
- HAAT: 201.5 m (661 ft)
- Transmitter coordinates: 33°23′51.4″N 86°39′40.9″W

Links
- Public license information: LMS
- Website: wotm.tv

WOTM-LD (channel 19) is a low-power independent television station in Birmingham, Alabama, United States. The station is owned by Broadway Communications, LLC.

WOTM-LD carries a number of locally produced television shows such as View Point, Central Alabama Sports Show, Sportz Blitz, and the Pelham High School Football Review. Additionally, WOTM broadcasts local high school football games and University of Alabama football games on a tape delay basis. In 2009, it hosted a weekly hour-long program by Alabama State Senator Hank Erwin.

WOTM-LD also carries religious programs, and shares some shows with WOIL-CD and WEAC-CD.
