= KXOK-LD =

Television station in Enid, Oklahoma (1994–2016)

- Enid, Oklahoma; United States
- Channels: Digital: 31 (UHF); Virtual: 31
- Branding: Enid's Outdoor Station

Programming
- Affiliations: Defunct

History
- Founded: November 21, 1994
- Last air date: 2016 (license canceled)
- Former call signs: K32DZ (1994–2001); KXOK-LP (2001–2009)
- Former affiliations: Pursuit Channel; America One; Azteca America; Retro TV

Technical information
- Licensing authority: FCC
- Facility ID: 168420
- ERP: 12.5 kW

Links
- Public license information: LMS

KXOK-LD (channel 31) was a low-power television station in Enid, Oklahoma, United States. Its broadcast license was cancelled by the Federal Communications Commission (FCC) in 2016.

== History ==
The station was founded November 21, 1994, under the call sign K32DZ, by Media Manics Incorporated of Enid, and managed by Charles D. Pearson. Its call sign changed to KXOK-LP on November 23, 2001. Rex Faulkner began managing the station in 2002. At the time, KXOK-LP aired on cable channel 18 and UHF channel 32. In 2002, the station built a new studio in Oakwood Mall, where it produced a local newscast and held auctions. Ownership was officially transferred to Faulkner on January 22, 2004. In 2004, the station filed a lawsuit against the University Network for breach of contract. The University Network filed a countersuit for copyright infringement. The station had been broadcasting programming featuring Dr. Gene Scott since November 2002. The station remained in Faulkner's ownership until his death in 2005.

It was managed by Dixie Meyer, executrix of the Estate of Rex Faulkner until its sale to ME3 Communications in 2007. On July 8, 2009, the station's call sign changed again to KXOK-LD. ME3 Communications merged with Oklahoma Broadcast Associates in 2011, forming TVOK Network LLC. Under both ME3 Communications and TVOK Network's ownership, the station was managed by Jack Mills. TVOK Network also owns KTEW-LD in Ponca City. KXOK was rebroadcasting KTEW's Retro TV-affiliated content.

Past programming has also included The Box, Horse TV, Americana Music Television, The Sportsman Channel, and Azteca América.

== Notable former staff ==
- D. L. Lang – video editor, former poet laureate of Vallejo, California

== Subchannel ==
Subchannel of KXOK-LD
Channel	Res.	Short name	Programming
31.1	480i	TVOK	Retro TV (4:3)

== Translators ==
- KTEW-LD Ponca City
- K35JY-D Lamont
- WQOS306-D Enid
