= WWLF-LD =

Television station in Syracuse, New York

- Syracuse, New York; United States
- Channels: Digital: 35 (UHF); Virtual: 35

Programming
- Affiliations: 35.1: LATV

Ownership
- Owner: Craig Fox; (Metro TV Inc.)
- Operator: Renard Communications

History
- First air date: 1991
- Former call signs: W35AQ (1988–1991); W49BF (1991–1997); W35AQ (1997–1998); WOBX-LP (1998–2016); WWLF-LP (2016–2020)
- Former channel numbers: Analog: 35 (UHF, 1991–2020)
- Former affiliations: The Box (1991–2001); MTV2 (2001–2009); Univision (2009); AMGTV (2009–20??)

Technical information
- Licensing authority: FCC
- Facility ID: 14324
- ERP: 4.92 kW
- HAAT: 53 m
- Transmitter coordinates: 43°3′30″N 76°10′0″W

Links
- Public license information: LMS

WWLF-LD (channel 35) is a low-power television station in Syracuse, New York, United States, affiliated with LATV. The station, owned by Metro TV Inc. (one of many companies majority-owned by Craig Fox), and operated by Renard Communications.

The original construction permit was issued to Craig Fox himself in June 1988, with a major modification filing the year after, and the first broadcast commenced in May 1991. The then-WOBX-LP was affiliated with The Box and then MTV2 after The Box ceased operations in 2001. WOBX-LP acquired the Univision affiliation as a Syracuse translator station for WNYI channel 52 in Ithaca until WNYI was bought by a religious broadcaster and dropped the Univision network. The station then turned into a AMGTV affiliate for the Syracuse market. As of 2024, the station is now an LATV affiliate.

== Subchannels ==
The station's signal is multiplexed:

Subchannels of WWLF-LD
Subchannel	Res.	Short name	Programming
35.1	480i	WWLF-LD	LATV
