= KEYI-LD =

Television station in Las Vegas

Currently dark
- Las Vegas, Nevada; United States
- Channels: Digital: 35 (UHF); Virtual: 35

Programming
- Affiliations: "Las Vegas Television Network" (2006–2010?); Silent (2010–?); GetTV (?–2024); Spanish Independent (2024–2025)

Ownership
- Owner: Mountain Ridge Holdings, Inc.

History
- Founded: April 15, 1994
- Former call signs: K61GV (1996–1999); K35FN (1999); KYRK-LP (1999–2005); KVTE-LP (2005–2018); KVTE-LD (2018–2024)
- Former channel numbers: Analog: 61 (UHF, 1999–2000), 35 (UHF, 2000–2018)

Technical information
- Licensing authority: FCC
- Facility ID: 40207
- Class: LD
- ERP: 10 kW; 15 kW (application)
- HAAT: −17.6 m (−58 ft); 528.5 m (1,734 ft) (application)
- Transmitter coordinates: 36°9′34.8″N 115°13′5″W; 35°56′44″N 115°2′38″W (application)

Links
- Public license information: LMS

KEYI-LD (channel 35) is a low-power television station in Las Vegas, Nevada, United States, which is currently dark. The station is owned by Mountain Ridge Holdings.

== History ==
On April 15, 1994, application JF0415CY was filed with the Federal Communications Commission. It was first granted a license to operate as K61GV channel 61 on April 15, 1996. On July 28, 1999, the station moved to its current frequency and changed its call letters to K35FN, then changed callsigns to KYRK-LP on November 5 of that year. The station then changed its call sign to KVTE-LP on June 17, 2005, and KVTE-LD on July 12, 2018. On June 19, 2024, the station received its current call sign of KEYI-LD.

Robin Leach became affiliated with KVTE in late 2004, and by March 2005, had filed a lawsuit against owner Nathan Drage claiming, among other things, fraud against the corporation. Ultimately over a year later, in May 2006, Leach dismissed his lawsuit and claimed it was all a misunderstanding and that the allegations of fraud were the result of a miscommunication between Leach and his legal counsel.

After Leach's departure, the station produced a completely different show line-up of all original programming geared towards a national and international audience for what it called the Las Vegas Television Network. By June 1, 2010, however, the station was airing color bars and tone and had filed for a silent Special Temporary Authority with the FCC. It has been silent since.

== Subchannels ==
The station's signal is multiplexed:

Subchannels of KEYI-LD
Subchannel	Res.	Short name	Programming
35.1	480i		TeleAmerica
35.2	480i		Movies!
35.3	480i		Religious programming
35.4	480i		[Blank]
