= WKGA =

- Goodwater, Alabama; United States
- Broadcast area: Lake Martin
- Frequency: 97.5 MHz
- Branding: Kowaliga Country

Programming
- Format: Country

Ownership
- Owner: Lake Broadcasting, Inc.

History
- First air date: 1991
- Former call signs: WSSY-FM (1990–2004); WKGA (6/15/04-6/22/04); WZLM (2004–2007)
- Call sign meaning: Kowaliga

Technical information
- Licensing authority: FCC
- Facility ID: 64557
- Class: A
- ERP: 5,100 watts
- HAAT: 108 meters (354 feet)
- Transmitter coordinates: 33°01′42″N 85°59′23″W

Links
- Public license information: Public file; LMS
- Website: wkga975.com

WKGA (97.5 FM, "Kowaliga Country") is a radio station licensed to serve Goodwater, Alabama, United States. The station, established in 1991 as WSSY-FM, is currently owned and operated by Lake Broadcasting, Inc.

== Programming ==
WKGA is based in Alexander City, Alabama, and broadcasts a country music format. The station's owner and general manager is John F. Kennedy. Weekday disc jockeys, mornings David and Moon, mid-days, Steve Cubbie Culberson and on afternoon drive Jay Jeffcoat. Notable weekend hosts include Ronnie Betts on the Sunday morning Gospel Jubilee. In addition to its music programming, the station broadcasts, Auburn Tigers football games, and flagship station for al AHSAA radio network statewide broadcasts.

== History ==
This station received its original construction permit from the Federal Communications Commission on May 16, 1989. The permit was for a new facility in Talladega, Alabama, broadcasting at 97.5 MHz with 3,000 watts of effective radiated power from a tower 44 meters in height above average terrain. In December 1989, this was modified to lower the power to 910 watts but raise the antenna to 175 meters above the average terrain. The new station was assigned the call letters WSSY-FM by the FCC on February 21, 1990. On that same day, permit holder Allan G. Stroh filed with the FCC to assign the permit to his Stroh Communications Corp. The transfer was approved by the FCC on March 20, 1990, and the transaction was consummated on April 23, 1990.

WSSY-FM received its license to cover from the FCC on March 5, 1991. In May 1991, Stroh Communications Corp. reached an agreement to sell this station to Talladega Broadcast Partners, Ltd. The deal was approved by the FCC on June 4, 1991, and the transaction was consummated on the same day.

In October 1997, Talladega Broadcast Partners, Ltd., reached an agreement to sell this station to Williamson Broadcasting, Inc. The deal was approved by the FCC on November 28, 1997, and the transaction was consummated on January 28, 1998. The station received a new construction permit in February 2001 to increase its ERP to 2,000 watts and, after the new transmitter was installed and tested, was licensed to operate at that power in October 2001.

In January 2003, Williamson Broadcasting, Inc. (Douglas A. Williamson, president) reached an agreement to sell this station to Great South RFDC, LLC (Paul Scott Alexander, managing member) for a reported sale price of $1.25 million. The deal was approved by the FCC on March 14, 2003, and the transaction was consummated on March 24, 2003. In March 2003, the station received another construction permit, this time to increase ERP to the current 5,100 watts and change its community of license to Goodwater, Alabama, as of July 2003.

On June 15, 2004, the station had the FCC change its callsign to WKGA but this would prove short-lived as they applied on June 22, 2004, to change it again, this time to WZLM.

In December 2006, Great South RFDC, LLC, applied to the FCC to transfer this license for station and five other co-owned stations to Great South Wireless, LLC, as part of a corporate restructuring. The transfer was approved by the FCC on February 9, 2007, and the transaction was consummated on February 12, 2007. At the time of the transfer, WZLM was airing an adult contemporary music format

On June 21, 2007, Great South Wireless, LLC, contracted to sell this station to Lake Broadcasting, Inc., for a reported $385,000. The deal was approved by the FCC on August 30, 2007, and the transaction was consummated on November 21, 2007. On November 27, 2007, the new owners applied to the FCC for new call letters WKGA to complete a swap of format and branding with the country music playing former sister station.
