= Channel 42 =

Channel 42 may refer to:

- "Channel 42" (instrumental), a 2013 instrumental by deadmau5 and Wolfgang Gartner from the album Album Title Goes Here
- Extra TV 42, a defunct Costa Rican television channel

== See also ==
- Channel 42 virtual TV stations in Canada
- Channel 42 virtual TV stations in the United States

For UHF frequencies covering 639.25-643.75 MHz:

- Channel 42 TV stations in Canada
- Channel 42 TV stations in Mexico
- Channel 42 digital TV stations in the United States
- Channel 42 low-power TV stations in the United States
