= Channel 33 =

Channel 33 may refer to several television stations:

- Canal 33 (El Salvador), a television channel in San Salvador, El Salvador
- Channel 33 (Israel), a defunct Israeli public television channel mainly for Arabic-speaking viewers
- Dubai 33, a defunct English language television channel in Dubai, United Arab Emirates
- DZOZ-TV (Light TV 33), a television station in Metro Manila, Philippines
- El 33, a Catalan public television channel in Spain
- Makan 33, an Israeli television channel

== Canada ==
The following television stations operate on virtual channel 33 in Canada:

- CFTF-DT-8 in Les Escoumins, Quebec
- CICO-DT-59 in Chatham, Ontario

== Mexico ==
The following television station operates on virtual channel 33 in Mexico:

- XHAS-TDT in Tijuana, Baja California

== See also ==
- Channel 33 virtual TV stations in the United States

For UHF frequencies covering 584-590 MHz

- Channel 33 TV stations in Canada
- Channel 33 TV stations in Mexico
- Channel 33 digital TV stations in the United States
- Channel 33 low-power TV stations in the United States
