= CW 5 =

CW 5 or CW5 may refer to:

== U.S. television stations affiliated with The CW network ==
=== Current ===
- KALB-TV-DT3 in Alexandria, Louisiana
- KCWQ-LD in Palm Springs, California (cable channel; broadcasts on channel 2.1)
  - KESQ-TV in Palm Springs, California (translator of KCWQ-LD; broadcasts on channel 2.3)
- KGWN-TV-DT3 in Cheyenne, Wyoming
- KNHL in Hastings, Nebraska
- KTLA in Los Angeles, California (O&O)
- WABI-TV-DT2 in Bangor, Maine
- WBKP in Calumet, Michigan
- WCYB-TV-DT2 in Bristol, Virginia
- WLAJ-DT2 in Lansing–Jackson, Michigan (cable channel; broadcasts on channel 53.2)

=== Former ===
- KSWB-TV in San Diego, California (2006–2008; was cable channel of over-the-air broadcast on channel 69)
- WPTZ-DT2 in Plattsburgh, New York–Burlington, Vermont (2013–2018)

== Other uses ==
- Chief Warrant Officer 5, a rank in the U.S. armed forces
- CW5, a United Kingdom postcode district in the CW postcode area, assigned to Cheshire along with small parts of Staffordshire and Shropshire
- CW5 (tram), a class of electric trams built by the Melbourne & Metropolitan Tramways Board
