= KESQ =

KESQ may refer to:

- KESQ-TV, a television station (channel 28, virtual channel 42) licensed to serve Palm Springs, California, United States
- KESQ (AM), a defunct radio station (1400 AM) formerly licensed to serve Indio, California
