= KCWQ-LD =

Television station in Palm Springs, California

- Palm Springs, California; United States
- Channels: Digital: 20 (UHF); Virtual: 2
- Branding: Palm Springs CW 5 (cable channel)

Programming
- Affiliations: 2.1: CW+; 33.3: Fox

Ownership
- Owner: News-Press & Gazette Company; (Gulf-California Broadcast Company)
- Sister stations: KESQ-TV, KPSP-CD, KDFX-CD, KUNA-LD, KYAV-LD, KUNA-FM

History
- Former call signs: "KCWB" (1998–2006)
- Former channel number: Digital: 26 (UHF, until 2019)
- Former affiliations: The WB (via The WB 100+, 1998–2006)
- Call sign meaning: disambiguation of former KCWB callsign after transition to The CW

Technical information
- Licensing authority: FCC
- Facility ID: 167761
- Class: LD
- ERP: 0.325 kW
- HAAT: 196.9 m (646 ft)
- Transmitter coordinates: 33°51′58.1″N 116°26′5″W
- Translator(s): KESQ-TV 42.7 (UHF) Palm Springs

Links
- Public license information: LMS

KCWQ-LD (channel 2, cable channel 5) is a low-power television station licensed to Palm Springs, California, United States, serving the Coachella Valley as an affiliate of The CW Plus. It is owned by the News-Press & Gazette Company alongside ABC affiliate KESQ-TV (channel 42) and four other low-power stations: Class A CBS affiliate KPSP-CD (channel 38), Class A Fox affiliate KDFX-CD (channel 33), Telemundo affiliate KUNA-LD (channel 15), and independent station KYAV-LD (channel 12). The six stations share studios on Dunham Way in Thousand Palms; KCWQ-LD's transmitter is located on Edom Hill northeast of Cathedral City and I-10.

Along with other major Coachella Valley television stations, KCWQ identifies itself on-air using its cable designation (Palm Springs CW 5) rather than its over-the-air channel position. The unusual practice stems in part from the area's exceptionally high cable penetration rate of 80.5% which is one of the highest in the United States.

In addition to its own digital signal, KCWQ is simulcast in widescreen standard definition on KESQ's seventh digital subchannel from the same Edom Hill transmitter facility.

== History ==
Originally, the station was a WB affiliate as part of the cable-only WB 100+ operation from September 21, 1998, to September 17, 2006. As such, it used the "KCWB" call sign in a fictional manner, as cable channels are not licensed by the Federal Communications Commission (FCC).

=== Carriage issues ===
Between The CW's launch on September 18, 2006, and April 21, 2007, KCWQ (and the network) was not available to Time Warner Cable systems in the Coachella Valley due to a carriage dispute. As the station was launched over-the-air, the News-Press & Gazette Company explained that they had requested the station be assigned KCWB's cable designation (channel 5) and came to several agreements to that effect with the local Time Warner Cable office. They were then all successively vetoed by the cable company's head office in Stamford, Connecticut.

The CW was half owned by the cable system's then-parent company, Time Warner. (Time Warner Cable was later spun off from Time Warner in 2009). Without an agreement in place, News-Press & Gazette was suggesting cable subscribers wishing to watch The CW use an over-the-air antenna and tune to VHF channel 2. The company also pointed out that the channel is available on Dish Network. Instead of KCWQ and The CW, Time Warner Cable substituted Classic Arts Showcase on channel 5. In the early days of the dispute, Time Warner also ran a ticker that explained the problem:

The CW Network is not available at this time. Despite continued talks, we have not been able to reach an agreement for carriage of this network. We will continue to negotiate and remain hopeful that an agreement will be reached soon.

In April 2007, News-Press & Gazette and Time Warner Cable reached an agreement that would finally add KCWQ to the cable lineup on channel 5 effective at 12:01 a.m. on April 21.

== Subchannels ==
The station's signal is multiplexed:

Subchannels of KCWQ-LD
Channel	Res.	Short name	Programming
2.1	720p	KCWQ-LD	The CW Plus
33.3	720p	KDFX-LD	Fox (KDFX-CD)

Simulcast of subchannels of another station

== See also ==
- Channel 2 low-power TV stations in the United States
- Channel 5 branded TV stations in the United States
- Channel 20 digital TV stations in the United States
- Channel 20 low-power TV stations in the United States
