= KDFX-CD =

Television station in Indio–Palm Springs, California

- Indio–Palm Springs, California; United States
- Channels: Digital: 33 (UHF); Virtual: 33
- Branding: Fox 11 (cable channel)

Programming
- Affiliations: Fox

Ownership
- Owner: News-Press & Gazette Company; (Gulf-California Broadcast Company)
- Sister stations: KESQ-TV, KPSP-CD, KCWQ-LD, KUNA-LD, KYAV-LD, KUNA-FM

History
- First air date: March 2, 1990
- Former call signs: K40DB (1990–1997); KDFX-LP (1997–2003); KDFX-CA (2003–2015)
- Former channel numbers: Analog: 40 (UHF, 1990–1997), 33 (UHF, 1997–2015); Digital: 39 (UHF, until 2019)
- Former affiliations: CBS (via KECY-TV, 1990–1994)
- Call sign meaning: Desert Fox

Technical information
- Licensing authority: FCC
- Facility ID: 51207
- Class: CD
- ERP: 15 kW
- HAAT: 196.9 m (646 ft)
- Transmitter coordinates: 33°51′58.1″N 116°26′5″W
- Translator(s): KESQ-TV 33.2 Palm Springs

Links
- Public license information: Public file; LMS
- Website: www.kesq.com

KDFX-CD (channel 33, cable channel 11) is a low-power, Class A television station licensed to both Indio and Palm Springs, California, United States, serving as the Fox affiliate for the Coachella Valley. It is owned by the News-Press & Gazette Company alongside ABC affiliate KESQ-TV (channel 42) and four other low-power stations: Class A CBS affiliate KPSP-CD (channel 38), CW affiliate KCWQ-LD (channel 2), Telemundo affiliate KUNA-LD (channel 15), and independent station KYAV-LD (channel 12). The six stations share studios on Dunham Way in Thousand Palms; KDFX-CD's transmitter is located on Edom Hill northeast of Cathedral City and I-10.

Along with other major Coachella Valley television stations, KDFX identifies itself on-air using its cable designation (Fox 11) rather than its over-the-air channel position. The unusual practice stems in part from the area's exceptionally high cable penetration rate of 80.5% which is one of the highest in the United States.

In addition to its own digital signal, KDFX is simulcast in standard definition on KESQ's fourth digital subchannel (virtual channel 33.2) from the same Edom Hill transmitter facility.

== History ==
The station signed on March 2, 1990, as K40DB, a translator of CBS affiliate KECY-TV in El Centro and began identifying as "KDBA-TV". The station was added on cable television on November 1, 1992. Along with its parent outlet, the station switched to Fox in September 1994, becoming the first CBS affiliate in the United States to join the so-called "fourth network" outside of the network's 1994 affiliation agreement with New World Communications. In fact, one reason owner Judge Robinson O. Everett of Wilmington, North Carolina signed with Fox was because Fox was willing to give Everett the primary Palm Springs affiliation, whereas CBS felt that KCBS-TV had sufficient penetration in the area and was demanding that the company's CBS affiliates resume producing local news. Prior to this switch, KECY aired some Fox programming, and cable viewers received KTTV from Los Angeles.

In 1997, Pacific Media Corporation (which was principally controlled by Robinson O. Everett) entered into a local management agreement (LMA) with a subsidiary of Beverly Hills, California–based Lambert Broadcasting, LLC. That company split the translator off and relaunched it as a separate Fox affiliate serving the Coachella Valley. On August 23 of that year, the station moved to UHF channel 33 and adopted KDFX-LP as its call sign. The LMA and options to purchase the two stations were sold a year later to the News-Press Gazette Company of St. Joseph, Missouri, bringing KDFX under common control with KESQ-TV. Lambert invested heavily in the station and upgraded it to Class A status on April 7, 2003, as KDFX-CA. In November 2007, NPG filed to buy the stations for $2 million. The station was licensed for digital operation on March 18, 2015, taking on the call sign KDFX-CD.

== Newscasts ==
KDFX airs a two-hour morning newscast (7–9 a.m.) and 6:30 and 10 p.m. newscasts from KESQ-TV.

== Subchannels ==
The station's signal is multiplexed:

Subchannels of KDFX-CD
Channel	Res.	Short name	Programming
33.1	720p	KDFX-LD	Fox
33.2	720p	KCWQ-LD	The CW Plus (KCWQ-LD)
33.3	480i	DDFX	Dabl

Simulcast of subchannels of another station

== See also ==
- Channel 11 branded TV stations in the United States
- Channel 33 low-power TV stations in the United States
- Channel 33 digital TV stations in the United States
