= KMIZ =

Television station in Columbia, Missouri

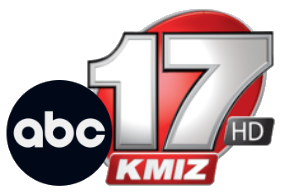

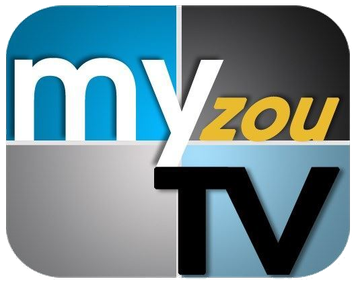
- Columbia–Jefferson City, Missouri; United States
- City: Columbia, Missouri
- Channels: Digital: 17 (UHF); Virtual: 17
- Branding: ABC 17 KMIZ; ABC 17 News; MeTV Mid-Missouri (17.2); MyZouTV (17.3)

Programming
- Affiliations: 17.1: ABC; 17.3: Independent with MyNetworkTV; 17.4: Fox; for others, see § Subchannels

Ownership
- Owner: News-Press & Gazette Company; (NPG of Missouri, LLC)
- Sister stations: KQFX-LD

History
- First air date: December 5, 1971
- Former call signs: KCBJ-TV (1971–1985)
- Former channel numbers: Analog: 17 (UHF, 1971–2009); Digital: 22 (UHF, 2003–2009)
- Former affiliations: ABC (1971–1982); NBC (1982–1985)
- Call sign meaning: Mizzou

Technical information
- Licensing authority: FCC
- Facility ID: 63164
- ERP: 120 kW; 231 kW (CP)
- HAAT: 352 m (1,155 ft)
- Transmitter coordinates: 38°46′32.1″N 92°33′24.9″W

Links
- Public license information: Public file; LMS
- Website: www.abc17news.com

KMIZ (channel 17) is a television station licensed to Columbia, Missouri, United States, serving the Columbia–Jefferson City market as an affiliate of ABC and MyNetworkTV. It is owned by the News-Press & Gazette Company alongside Fox affiliate KQFX-LD (channel 22); the stations together are branded as the "Networks of Mid-Missouri". The two stations share studios on the East Business Loop 70 in Columbia; KMIZ's transmitter is located west of Jamestown.

Channel 17 in Columbia began broadcasting as KCBJ-TV on December 5, 1971. It brought a full-time ABC affiliate to Mid-Missouri; the network's programming had previously been split between the market's two other major commercial stations. KCBJ-TV was built by Richard Koenig, a St. Louis–based engineer. It struggled in its early years with its ultra high frequency (UHF) signal, the first in the market; entrenched and established competition; and lack of financial resources to invest in local programming and technical improvements. In 1979, Koenig agreed to sell the station to the Wooster Republican Printing Company, but the deal turned sour, and the prospective buyers sued for breach of contract. Litigation in that case was still pending when an ascendant ABC switched its affiliation to KOMU-TV (channel 8) in 1982, leaving KCBJ-TV to take over KOMU's former NBC affiliation.

Koenig sold KCBJ-TV to Stauffer Communications, which took control in January 1985. With NBC rising in the ratings, it poached KOMU-TV from ABC, leading to a switch of network affiliations again that December. To coincide with the new affiliation and Stauffer's investment in a new image and improved news coverage, the station changed its call sign to KMIZ. Under Benedek Broadcasting ownership, KMIZ purchased two low-power stations to start the area's Fox affiliate, a predecessor of KQFX-LD. News-Press & Gazette Company acquired the stations from JW Broadcasting in 2012.

== History ==
=== KCBJ-TV: Early years ===
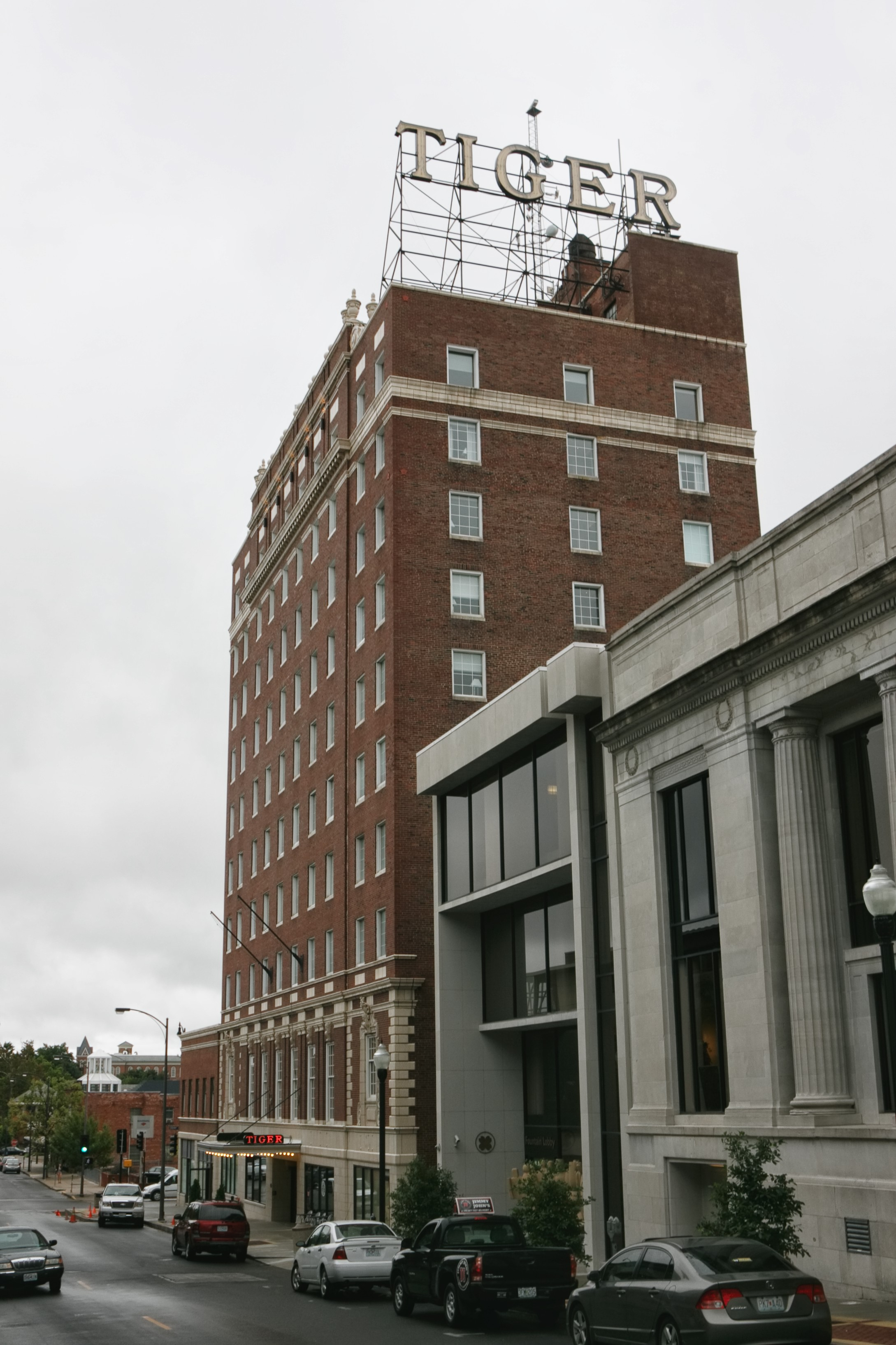
The Tiger Hotel in downtown Columbia housed KCBJ-TV's studios from 1971 to 1978.

In September 1969, Jeffco Television Corporation, associated with station WJJY-TV in Jacksonville, Illinois, applied to the Federal Communications Commission (FCC) for permission to build a station on ultra high frequency (UHF) channel 17 in Columbia. At the time, Mid-Missouri had no full-time affiliate of ABC; its programs were split between primary NBC affiliate KOMU-TV (channel 8) and primary CBS affiliate KRCG (channel 13). In November, Channel Seventeen, Inc., headed by St. Louis engineer Richard Koenig, also applied for the channel. The two applications were designated by the commission for comparative hearing, but Jeffco dropped out due to problems at its station in Illinois, allowing Channel Seventeen to receive the construction permit on August 28, 1970.

KCBJ-TV began broadcasting on December 5, 1971, as a full-time ABC affiliate. It broadcast from a tower at Jamestown, Missouri, 17 miles (27 km) southwest of Columbia. The station's early months were pocked with technical issues; it was the only local station with a studio and transmitter at separate sites. Moreover, many older television sets still in use were not UHF-capable. Unable to afford a direct microwave feed, Koenig had his engineers switch to and from the signal of KMTC-TV in Springfield—which, in turn, picked up the signal off-air from KODE-TV in Joplin. If a network program was preempted in either of those cities, KCBJ-TV could not show it; occasionally, weather warnings and other material from the Springfield area appeared on channel 17 as well. In its first three and a half years of operation, the station never once made a profit and, as a result, could not afford the expenditures necessary to improve the quality of its incoming network feed. In the ratings, KCBJ-TV struggled against KOMU and KRCG, which had been in the market nearly 20 years when channel 17 signed on and were better-funded stations with stronger local news presences. Koenig became aggressive in his efforts to defend channel 17 from competition. He unsuccessfully argued that KOMU-TV, a commercial station owned by the University of Missouri (MU) and the more successful of Columbia's two local stations, should be forced to become non-commercial and a new private commercial station on the UHF band opened to provide NBC programming. He successfully led the FCC to deny a tower upgrade for KTVO, an ABC affiliate in Kirksville, that threatened to take viewers away from his station in such cities as Moberly, Mexico, and Centralia. He fought the introduction of cable television to Columbia, winning network non-duplication protection so that channel 17 was the only source for ABC network programs on the system—even though the CBS and NBC affiliates did not receive the same perk. As the decade went on, channel 17 became more reliable and obtained its own microwave link to improve signal quality for ABC programming. In 1978, it acquired its present studio facilities from Columbia College, which had used the site to house its extended studies program; this enabled channel 17 to triple its office space and vacate its site in the Tiger Hotel downtown, where it had utilized a portion of the hotel's parking garage.

Koenig agreed in August 1979 to sell KCBJ-TV to the Wooster Republican Printing Company of Wooster, Ohio, controlled by the Dix family. The acquisition of channel 17 would have marked the return of the Dix family to television after their sale years prior of WTRF-TV in Wheeling, West Virginia. Two months later, the Dix family sued, claiming Koenig had breached the sale contract; Koenig replied by declaring that there never was a valid contract. In 1981, the Dix family won the initial lawsuit and a court order forcing Koenig to sell the station to them. Koenig appealed the ruling; federal judge Scott Olin Wright, a former lawyer in Columbia, ordered the station to be transferred to a receiver during the process, but Koenig refused, claiming Wright held a grudge against KCBJ-TV from an earlier legal contact when the station started and that a short-form transfer of control was not appropriate for the process.

As the appeals continued in the breach of contract case, ABC sought to move to the higher-rated KOMU-TV. In the late 1970s, ABC became the number-one network and began seeking upgrades in its affiliate base, primarily at the expense of NBC. It contacted KOMU-TV, the number-one station in Mid-Missouri, in 1979; that was the year NBC hired Fred Silverman, and KOMU instead renewed with NBC in hopes that Silverman could turn around the network's low ratings. This did not materialize, and the station instead agreed to switch in 1982. While it was logical that KCBJ-TV, the local station without a network affiliation, and NBC, the network needing a station, would connect, the ongoing ownership dispute complicated matters because the network received affiliation pitches from the Koenigs and the Dix family. The switch was set for July 12, but Wright issued a temporary restraining order to prevent ABC from moving. KOMU's ABC switch was then set for August 8, though no NBC deal was in place for channel 17 until late July. The sale to Wooster Republican Printing Company fell through by February 1983.

=== Stauffer ownership ===
In October 1984, Stauffer Communications agreed to purchase KCBJ-TV from the Koenig family, assuming control in January 1985. The company's first priority was to revamp the station's neglected and little-watched news operation, described by the Columbia Daily Tribune as "laughable at best" and by station manager Rush Evans as a "cursory programming service". It was a distant third behind KOMU and KRCG in the ratings, only attracting three percent of the audience. The newscasts finally had two cameras instead of one, and the news staff was increased from five employees to thirteen. At the same time, the fortunes of NBC turned; the network was in the lead nationally, and KCBJ was the number-one station in prime time. Citing its disappointment with revenues under ABC, KOMU announced it would return to NBC. It was not alone; other recent converts from NBC to ABC were beginning to return to the network, including stations in Temple, Texas, and Savannah, Georgia.

Stauffer affiliated channel 17 with ABC and used the opportunity to change the station's call letters, which it had already been considering. It discovered that KMIZ was assigned to an inactive U.S. Coast Guard vessel and had the call sign released for use. The switch and new name took effect on December 30, 1985; at a party for employees, Evans blew up a large plaster and Styrofoam block bearing the KCBJ-TV call letters after the playing of "Taps". The improved newscast increased ratings from a three percent share to 12 percent in 1986.

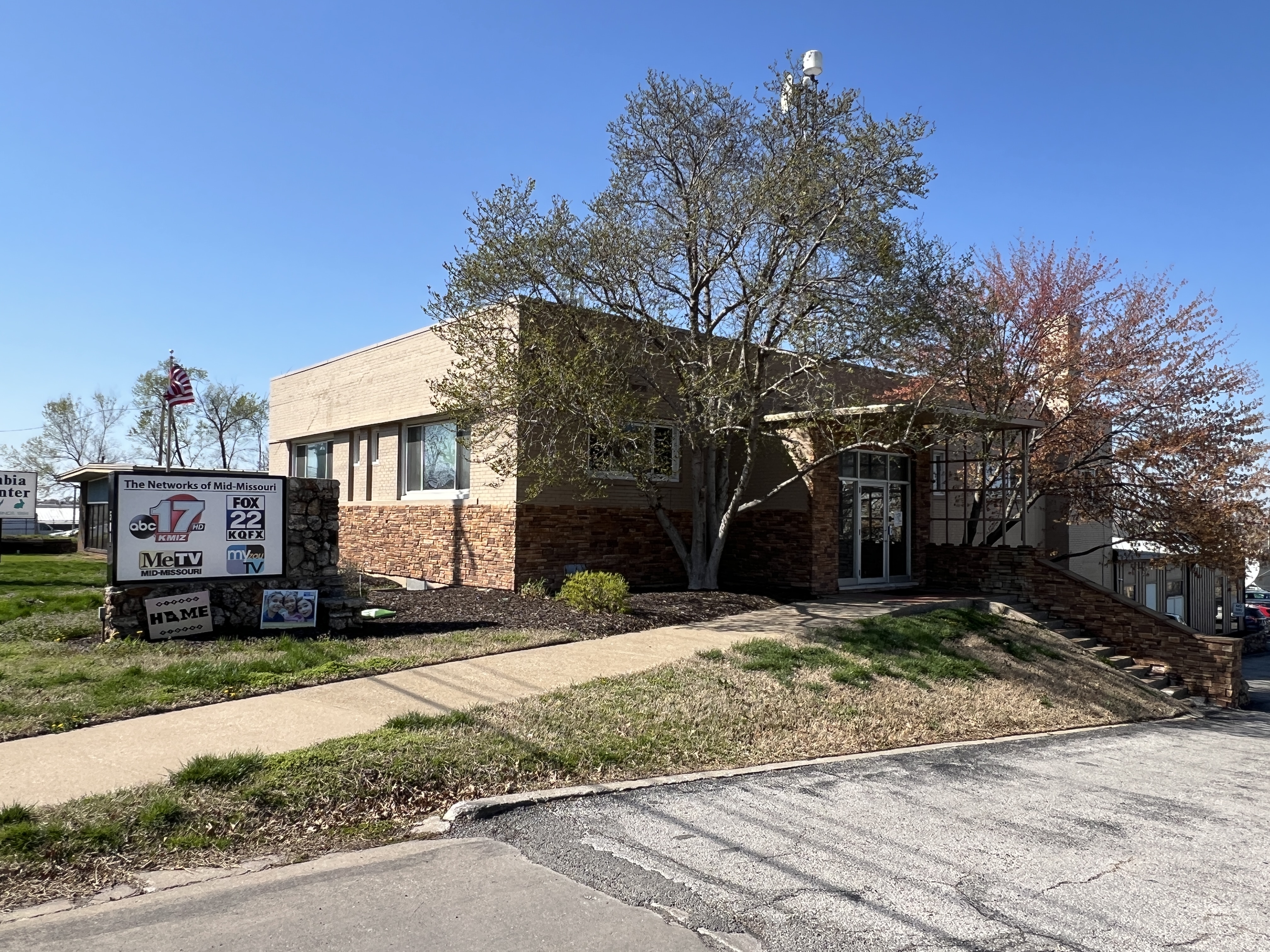
The studio building of KMIZ and KQFX in Columbia, Missouri, off East Business Loop 70

In 1995, Stauffer sold its holdings to Morris Communications. Morris kept the company's newspapers and spun off most of the television stations to Benedek Broadcasting of Rockford, Illinois, for $60 million (equivalent to $127 million in 2025). After being sold to Benedek, the station expanded its offerings. In April 1997, it acquired two low-power TV stations, K11TB in Jefferson City and K02NQ in Columbia. In September in Columbia and on cable and in October in Jefferson City, it launched them as the first over-the-air Fox affiliate for the market; in 1996, KMIZ had carried Fox's coverage of the NFL and the World Series. The next year, Benedek agreed to sell advertising for the local WB 100+ cable channel. The partnership for the cable channel, "KJWB", transferred to KOMU-TV in January 2002.

=== Chelsey and JW Broadcasting ownership ===
Financial problems developed at Benedek in the new millennium. The early 2000s recession reduced ad sales and caused the company to miss interest payments on a set of bonds issued in 1996, prompting a filing for Chapter 11 bankruptcy. Benedek's financial issues hurt investment in KMIZ and led to staff cuts and the station canceling its 5 p.m. newscast in 2001.

While most of Benedek's stations were sold out of bankruptcy to Gray Television, some—including KMIZ—went to Chelsey Broadcasting, an affiliate of the Chelsey Capital hedge fund which was a major investor in Benedek. Chelsey owned KMIZ for a year before selling it to JosephWood (JW) Broadcasting, a partnership formed by David J. Joseph and James Wood. JosephWood sought to turn around the station, which had been among Benedek's worst ratings performers, by investing in staff and capital improvements. Among the upgrades was the 2004 switch of Fox from its existing low-power transmitters to channel 38 from a tower near Ashland, Missouri, which doubled Fox's reach; the addition of a 9 p.m. local newscast on the Fox channel; and the launch of two new services, UPN-affiliated "KZOU" and the Show Me Weather Channel, available on cable and from KMIZ's new digital transmitter. The station improved its ratings in morning and late news but remained very far behind KRCG and KOMU in the early evening newscast race. "KZOU" affiliated with MyNetworkTV when UPN merged with The WB to form The CW in 2006.

In JW Broadcasting's final years, the station expanded its local news department. In 2011, it converted its newscasts to high-definition production, introduced the market's first local newscast at 6:30 p.m., and opened a newsroom in Jefferson City.

=== News-Press & Gazette Company ownership ===
On July 26, 2012, JW Broadcasting announced the sale of KMIZ and KQFX-LD to the News-Press & Gazette Company (NPG) for $16 million (equivalent to $22 million in 2025). The sale marked NPG's entry into a second Missouri TV market after starting a low-power station, KNPN-LD, in its home city of St. Joseph. At the time, NPG CEO David Bradley served as chairman of the University of Missouri system's board of curators. Since the university owns KOMU, this raised concern that NPG's purchase of KMIZ would effectively give Bradley control of two local stations in contravention of FCC ownership limits. NPG argued that Bradley had no personal involvement in KOMU's operations. The sale was consummated on November 1.

NPG has expanded the news department several times. In 2013, KMIZ debuted weekday newscasts at 9 a.m. and noon. The station debuted weekend morning newscasts for KMIZ and KQFX in 2016; by 2023, the station produced 30 1/2 hours a week of local news programming on its main channel.

== Notable former on-air staff ==
- Savannah Guthrie – weekend anchor, 1993–1995

== Technical information ==
=== Subchannels ===
KMIZ's transmitter is located west of Jamestown. The station's signal is multiplexed:

Subchannels of KMIZ
Subchannel	Res.	Short name	Programming
17.1	720p	KMIZ-DT	ABC
17.2	480i	Me-TV	MeTV
17.3	480i	KZOU-TV	Independent with MyNetworkTV
17.4	720p	KQFX	Fox (KQFX-LD)
17.5	480i	Bounce	Bounce TV
17.6	480i	Nosey	Nosey
17.7	480i	Confess	Confess

Simulcast of subchannels of another station

When JW Broadcasting began broadcasting KMIZ's digital signal, the station multiplexed KMIZ as well as "Fox 38", KZOU, and the Show Me Weather channel. In 2012, the weather channel, since rebranded StormTrack 24/7, was replaced by MeTV, with station management citing the increasing availability of weather information on smartphones and other devices.

=== Analog-to-digital conversion ===
KMIZ shut down its analog signal over UHF channel 17, on June 12, 2009, the official date on which full-power television stations in the United States transitioned from analog to digital broadcasts under federal mandate. The station's digital signal relocated from its pre-transition UHF channel 22 to channel 17 for post-transition operations. Days after, KQFX was converted to digital and switched from channel 38 to channel 22.
