= Journal Star =

Journal Star may refer to:

- Lincoln Journal Star, a daily newspaper of Lincoln, Nebraska
- Peoria Journal Star, a daily newspaper of Peoria, Illinois

== See also ==
- The Daily Star-Journal, of Warrensburg, Missouri
