= KYAV-LD =

Television station in Palm Springs, California

- Palm Springs, California; United States
- Channels: Digital: 12 (VHF); Virtual: 12
- Branding: KESQ News Now

Programming
- Affiliations: 12.2: Independent; 15.3: Telemundo; 38.2: CBS

Ownership
- Owner: News-Press & Gazette Company; (Gulf-California Broadcast Company)

History
- Founded: July 25, 1990
- Former call signs: K12OJ (1990–1997); KYAV-LP (1997–2012)
- Former affiliations: CNC; Mas Musica; AccuWeather (2012–2019)
- Call sign meaning: Yucca Valley

Technical information
- Licensing authority: FCC
- Facility ID: 2961
- Class: LD
- ERP: 0.25 kW
- HAAT: 185.2 m (608 ft)
- Transmitter coordinates: 33°51′58″N 116°26′6″W

Links
- Public license information: LMS

KYAV-LD (channel 12) is a low-power independent television station in Palm Springs, California, United States, serving the Coachella Valley. It is owned by the News-Press & Gazette Company (NPG) alongside ABC affiliate KESQ-TV (channel 42) and four other low-power stations: CBS affiliate KPSP-CD (channel 38), Fox affiliate KDFX-CD (channel 33), CW+ affiliate KCWQ-LD (channel 2), and Telemundo affiliate KUNA-LD (channel 15). The six stations share studios on Dunham Way in Thousand Palms; KYAV-LD's transmitter is located on Edom Hill northeast of Cathedral City and I-10.

== History ==
Founded July 25, 1990, KYAV-LD has been previously affiliated with CNC, a Spanish-language news channel based in Colombia, and Mas Musica, a 24-hour Spanish-language music video channel.

In January 2003, the station relaunched with Azteca América programming; that May, Desert Television—owner of KPSP-CD—acquired the outlet.

On October 18, 2009, the then-KYAV-LP went out of business and the signal ceased operations. On February 22, 2012, the station changed its call sign to KYAV-LD. The station became an affiliate of AccuWeather, a 24-hour weather network that features live reports and forecasts.

In January 2012, News-Press & Gazette Company acquired the non-license assets of KYAV and KPSP; a year later, it purchased the stations' licenses outright. The deals made KYAV a sister station to ABC affiliate KESQ-TV and Telemundo affiliate KUNA-LP, among other stations.

As of 2019, the AccuWeather affiliation (which has been discontinued from most of its affiliates by this point) has been dropped in favor of a "News" format.

== Subchannels ==
The station's signal is multiplexed:

Subchannels of KYAV-LD
| Channel | Res. | Short name | Programming |
|---|---|---|---|
| 12.2 | 720p | Newsnow | Main KYAV-LD programming |
| 15.3 | 1080i | Telemun | Telemundo (KUNA-LD) |
| 38.2 | 1080i | CBSLCL2 | CBS (KPSP-CD) |

Simulcast of subchannels of another station
