= Avis Tucker =

- Born: Avis Green; July 30, 1915; Concordia, Kansas, U.S.
- Died: December 17, 2010 (aged 95); Kansas City, Missouri, U.S.
- Occupation: Publisher

Avis Green Tucker (July 30, 1915 – December 17, 2010) was an American newspaper editor and publisher. She owned The Daily Star-Journal in Warrensburg, Missouri from 1947 to 2007.

== Early life and education ==
She was born Avis Green in Concordia, Kansas, and raised in Pleasant Hill, Missouri. the daughter of Ralph Green and Nellie Schroer Green. She won a local temperance essay contest when she was a teen. She graduated from Southwest High School in 1933, and from the University of Missouri in 1937. In college she was president of her sorority, Kappa Alpha Theta.

== Career ==
Tucker and her husband bought the Star-Journal in 1947; they also owned an AM radio station, KOKO in Warrensburg. Her husband died in 1966, and she continued to edit and publish the newspaper until 2007, when she sold it to the News-Press & Gazette Company. "I have felt an obligation to publish a paper which serves the community and takes sides on issues that I think are best for the community and the most people," she recalled of her guiding principle.

In 1973 Tucker was the first female president of Missouri Associated Dailies. She received an honor medal from the Missouri School of Journalism in 1976. She was the first female president of the Missouri Press Association in 1982. Also in 1982, she received the McKinney Award from the National Newspaper Association. She was the first woman inducted into the Missouri Press Association's Newspaper Hall of Fame in 1992.

Beyond newspaper work, Tucker became the first female chair of the University of Missouri Board of Curators in 1972 and was the first woman trustee of Westminster College. She chaired Missouri's Coordinating Board for Higher Education in the 1980s, and received a Distinguished Service award from the State Historical Society of Missouri in 1996, after she completed a three-year term as the first female president of the society.

== Personal life ==
Green married journalist William Tucker in Memphis, Tennessee on June 8, 1941. Her husband died in 1966, and she died in 2010, at the age of 95, in Kansas City.
