= KQFX-LD =

Television station in Columbia, Missouri

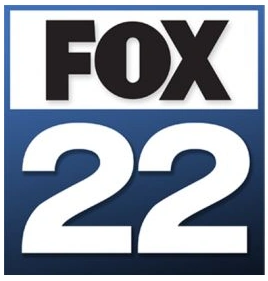
- Columbia–Jefferson City, Missouri; United States
- City: Columbia, Missouri
- Channels: Digital: 30 (UHF); Virtual: 22
- Branding: Fox 22 KQFX

Programming
- Affiliations: 22.1: Fox; for others, see § Subchannels

Ownership
- Owner: News-Press & Gazette Company; (NPG of Missouri, LLC)
- Sister stations: KMIZ

History
- Founded: January 14, 1988
- First air date: June 4, 1990 (former license); February 20, 2004 (current license)
- Former call signs: Former license: K11TB (1991−2004); K38II (2004−2009); Current license: K11SN (1988−2004); KZOU-LP (2004–June 2009); KQFX-LP (June−July 2009)
- Former channel numbers: Analog: 11 (VHF, 1990-2004), 38 (UHF, 2004-2009); Digital: 22 (UHF, 2008-2020)
- Former affiliations: UPN (2004–2006); MyNetworkTV (2006–2009)
- Call sign meaning: refers to Fox affiliation

Technical information
- Licensing authority: FCC
- Facility ID: 56176
- Class: LD
- ERP: 15 kW
- HAAT: 349.6 m (1,147 ft)
- Transmitter coordinates: 38°46′32.1″N 92°33′24.9″W
- Translator(s): KMIZ 17.4 Columbia; K18KK-D Columbia

Links
- Public license information: LMS
- Website: www.abc17news.com/fox22

KQFX-LD (channel 22) is a low-power television station licensed to Columbia, Missouri, United States, serving as the Fox affiliate for the Columbia–Jefferson City market. It is owned by the News-Press & Gazette Company (NPG) alongside dual ABC/MyNetworkTV affiliate KMIZ (channel 17); the stations together are branded as the "Networks of Mid-Missouri". The two stations share studios on the East Business Loop 70 in Columbia; KQFX-LD's transmitter is located west of Jamestown near the Moniteau–Cooper county line.

In addition to its own digital signal, KQFX-LD is simulcast in high definition on KMIZ's fourth digital subchannel (17.4) from the same transmitter site.

KQFX-LD is the successor to three different low-power TV stations, two in Columbia and one in Jefferson City, the oldest of which began broadcasting in 1990. Benedek Broadcasting brought the Fox network to Mid-Missouri in 1997 by acquiring two of them and running them alongside KMIZ. The third was acquired in 2003 and is the current license on which the station has operated since the digital television transition in 2009. KQFX offers morning and late newscasts produced by KMIZ.

== History ==
=== K02NQ "KONQ" ===
In 1989, Ray Karpowicz, the general manager of WEVU and W07BR "WBR" in Naples, Florida, and a graduate of the Missouri School of Journalism, obtained a permit from the Federal Communications Commission (FCC) to build a new low-power TV station on channel 2 in Columbia—K02NQ, typically styled "KONQ". The transmitter for channel 2 was atop downtown Columbia's Tiger Hotel. The station began broadcasting on June 4, 1990. It featured syndicated shows and movies and rebroadcasts of KOMU-TV's local programming and newscasts, as well as programming from the National College Television network, which distributed student-produced shows. By August 1991, it had dropped most of that programming for Channel America. At that time, Karpowicz held a construction permit for another low-power station in Jefferson City.

In 1997, Karpowicz sold K02NQ and K11TB in Jefferson City to Benedek Broadcasting, the owners of Columbia ABC affiliate KMIZ (channel 17). The stations were relaunched as Mid-Missouri's first in-market and full-time Fox affiliate, carried on cable channel 11. Part-time Fox programming was previously seen as a secondary affiliation on CBS station KRCG-TV (until 1996), while full-time programming from Fox can be seen at the time on cable via neighboring sandwiched stations or Foxnet, but many cable systems in the Mid-Missouri region continued to show full-time Fox programming from other markets (Kansas City, Springfield, and St. Louis) due to the station's low-power signal.

=== K11SN "KXI" ===
In October 1990, Tom Koenig put K11SN, styled "KXI-TV", on the air after it first broadcast the month before. Koenig's father, Richard, had built channel 17 as KCBJ-TV in 1971; he had applied for the low-power channel in 1981, envisioning a station that promoted KCBJ's news product. It was promoted as an affiliate of the short-lived Star Television Network. Channel 11 was affiliated with All News Channel, The Learning Channel, Country Music Television, and Movie Greats Network; it offered local programming shot on Super VHS cameras as well as a simulcast of the morning talk show of local radio station KFRU.

Koenig died in February 2000. Three years later, Tom sold K11SN to JW Broadcasting, the new owners of KMIZ. JW added a 9 p.m. local newscast from KMIZ to "Fox 11", now also known as KQFX, in 2003.

=== KQFX ===
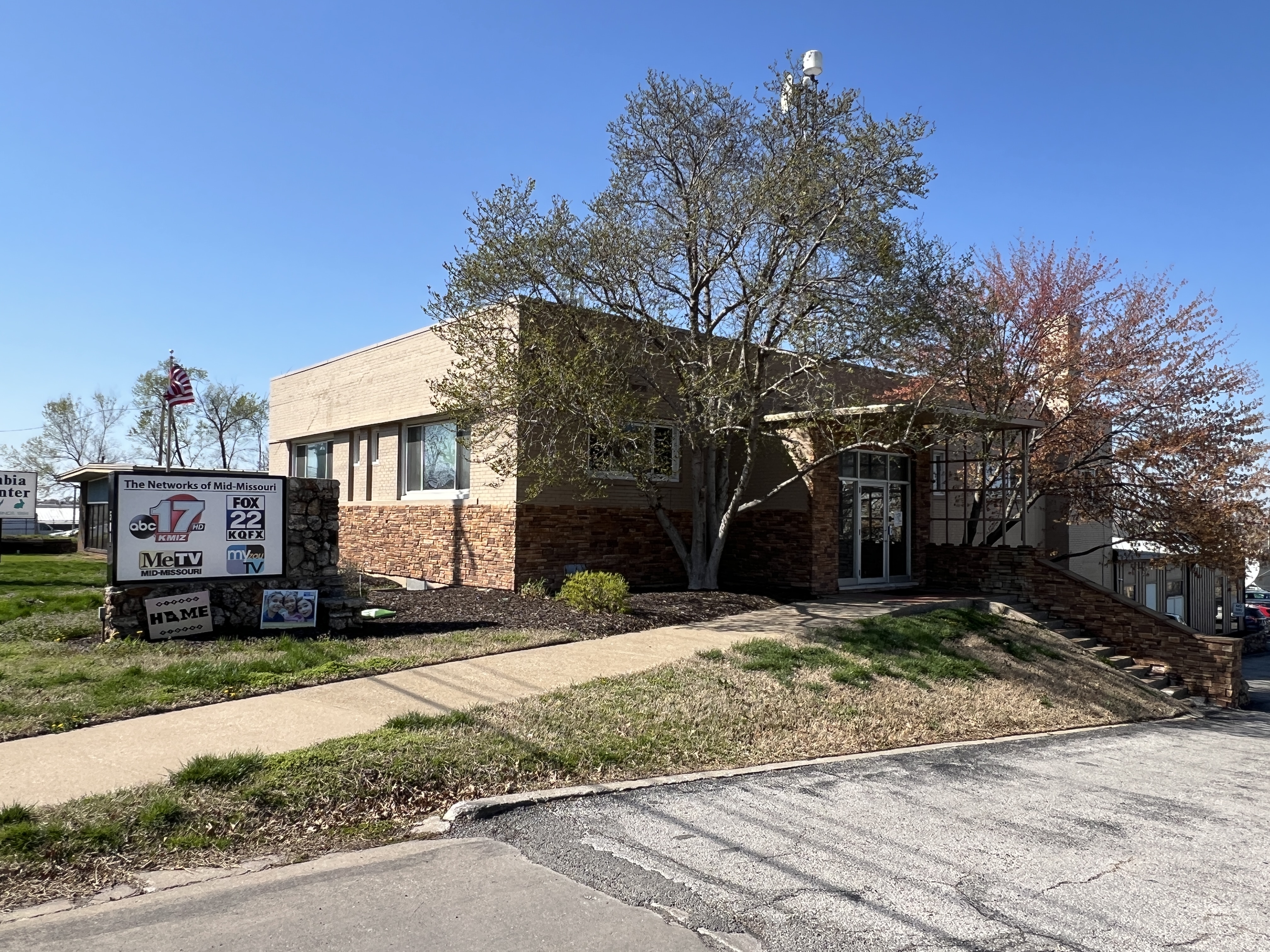
The studio building of KQFX-LD in Columbia, Missouri, off East Business Loop 70. The station shares a studio with ABC affiliate KMIZ.

Due to the start of digital operations by KRCG-TV, in 2004, JW Broadcasting applied to move K11TB and K11SN to new channels—38 and 32, respectively. It built a new tower in Ashland, Missouri, for channel 38, which became the main Fox signal. That year also saw the launch of two new services, UPN-affiliated "KZOU" (which appeared on channel 32, renamed KZOU-LP) and the Show Me Weather Channel, available on cable and from KMIZ's new digital transmitter.

On June 14, 2009, two days after the digital television transition for full-power stations, KQFX moved from channel 38 to digital operations on channel 22 on the former K11SN/KZOU-LP license and became "Fox 22". KMIZ had been using channel 22 for pre-transition digital operations.

In 2012, JW Broadcasting sold KMIZ and KQFX-LD to the News-Press & Gazette Company (NPG) for $16 million. NPG lengthened the weeknight prime time newscast on KQFX from 30 to 60 minutes in 2013.

== Subchannels ==
The station's signal is multiplexed:

Subchannels of KQFX-LD
Subchannel	Res.	Short name	Programming
22.1	720p	FOX 22	Fox
22.2	480i	Laff	Laff (4:3)
22.3	480i	Grit	Grit (4:3)
22.4	480i	Mystery	Ion Mystery (4:3)
22.5	480i	DABL	Dabl
