= KPSP-CD =

Television station in Cathedral City, California

- Cathedral City–Palm Springs, California; United States
- City: Cathedral City, California
- Channels: Digital: 18 (UHF); Virtual: 38
- Branding: CBS Local 2 (cable channel)

Programming
- Affiliations: CBS

Ownership
- Owner: News-Press & Gazette Company; (Gulf-California Broadcast Company)
- Sister stations: KESQ-TV, KDFX-CD, KCWQ-LD, KUNA-LD, KYAV-LD, KUNA-FM

History
- Founded: September 25, 1996
- First air date: October 5, 1997
- Former call signs: K58FJ (1996–1997); KPSP-LP (1997–2011); KPSP-LD
- Former channel numbers: Analog: 38 (UHF, 2002–2009); Digital: 38 (UHF, until 2019)
- Former affiliations: Independent (1997–2002)
- Call sign meaning: "Palm Springs Production" or the IATA and ICAO codes for Palm Springs International Airport

Technical information
- Licensing authority: FCC
- Facility ID: 10535
- Class: CD
- ERP: 15 kW
- HAAT: 196.9 m (646 ft)
- Transmitter coordinates: 33°51′58.1″N 116°26′5″W
- Translator(s): KESQ-TV 42.2 Palm Springs

Links
- Public license information: Public file; LMS
- Website: www.kesq.com

KPSP-CD (channel 38, cable channel 2) is a low-power, Class A television station licensed to Cathedral City, California, United States, serving the Palm Springs area as an affiliate of CBS. It is owned by the News-Press & Gazette Company alongside ABC affiliate KESQ-TV (channel 42) and four other low-power stations: Class A Fox affiliate KDFX-CD (channel 33), CW affiliate KCWQ-LD (channel 2), Telemundo affiliate KUNA-LD (channel 15), and independent station KYAV-LD (channel 12). The six stations share studios on Dunham Way in Thousand Palms; KPSP-CD's transmitter is located on Edom Hill northeast of Cathedral City and I-10.

Along with other major Coachella Valley television stations, KPSP identifies itself on-air using its cable designation (CBS Local 2) rather than its over-the-air channel position. The unusual practice stems in part from the area's exceptionally high cable penetration rate of 80.5% which is one of the highest in the United States.

In addition to its own digital signal, KPSP is simulcast in standard definition on KESQ's second digital subchannel (42.2) from the same Edom Hill transmitter facility.

== History ==
The station signed on the air on October 5, 1997, originally as an independent station airing movies, syndicated shows and local programming.

It broadcast an analog signal on UHF channel 38. Prior to becoming the Coachella Valley's first ever CBS affiliate on September 2, 2002, programming from the network came into the market via cable or antenna (in some areas) through Los Angeles owned-and-operated station KCBS-TV. When KPSP went on-the-air, area cable companies displaced KCBS at that outlet's request. KPSP adopted the "CBS 2" moniker following the practice of major local competitors in using its cable designation for branding purposes.

On April 1, 2008, it switched from branding itself "CBS 2" to "KPSP Local 2" although the "CBS 2" logo was retained for several months afterwards. On January 31, 2012, KPSP was sold by Desert Television to the News-Press & Gazette Company becoming a sister station to KESQ. It moved from its own studios on Dunham Way in Thousand Palms to KESQ's facility in Palm Desert. KPSP's transmitter on 38.1 went silent at midnight on March 1, 2012; the station's license was not initially included in the deal. CBS programming is now broadcast on 42.2 on the KESQ-DT digital tier and the lineup has not changed. In January 2013, News Press & Gazette acquired the KPSP-CD license, as well as KYAV-LD, from Desert Television. The Class A channel 38 digital transmitter was turned back on on February 7, allowing CBS programming to be shown over the air in 1080i high definition for the first time in nearly a year. NPG's acquisition of the Desert Television assets was completed on April 26.

== News operation ==
At one point while operating as a separate entity, KPSP aired its early weeknight newscast from 5 to 6:30 p.m. advertising the slot as a single 90-minute newscast. The CBS Evening News would therefore be seen in the regular time period at 6:30. The station would eventually move the CBS Evening News to 5:30 p.m.

After KPSP was acquired by KESQ, this station had its operations temporarily merged into that outlet's facility. Local news offerings on both outlets were adjusted as a result. Later, both stations moved back to the Dunham Way location and operated separately out of different studios for seven years. On December 2, 2018, the CBS Local 2 news brand was discontinued and all news offerings on CBS Local 2 were offered under a unified News Channel 3 branding. The staff previously assigned to CBS Local 2 newscasts were folded into the News Channel 3 brand on all stations. On April 24, 2019, the space previously occupied by the CBS Local 2 news set was launched with a new set supporting the local Telemundo affiliate's Spanish newscasts.

Fox affiliate KDFX-CD airs a nightly hour prime time newscast at 10 p.m. produced by KESQ featuring the News Channel 3 branding and anchors. The program competes with low-power MyNetworkTV affiliate KPSG-LP (now KPSE-LD), which had local news seen for thirty minutes at the same time produced by rival NBC affiliate KMIR-TV.

=== Notable former staff ===
- Adrianna Costa
- Rich Fields
- David Garcia (host of Eye on Riverside County newsmagazine)

== Technical information ==
=== Subchannels ===
The station's signal is multiplexed:

Subchannels of KPSP-CD
Channel	Res.	Short name	Programming
12.1	720p	NEWSNOW	KESQ News Now (KYAV-LD)
15.1	1080i	TELE-HD	Telemundo (KUNA-LD)
38.1	1080i	CBS-HD	CBS

Simulcast of subchannels of another station

== See also ==
- Channel 2 branded TV stations in the United States
- Channel 18 digital TV stations in the United States
- Channel 18 low-power TV stations in the United States
- Channel 38 virtual TV stations in the United States
