= Thomas Hollyman =

American photographer (1919–2009)

Thomas Benton Hollyman (December 7, 1919 – November 14, 2009) was an American photojournalist who created travel photographs for magazines and advertising campaigns.

Graydon Carter, managing editor of Vanity Fair, in his magazine's Editor's Letter, January 2005, titled "The Shots Seen Around the World", described Hollyman as a photographer whose "travels help form the patina of their characters and the grist for their tales."

Hollyman also worked as the Director of Photography for the 1963 film Lord of the Flies

== Education and early career ==
The son of a Presbyterian pastor, Hollyman was born in Denver, Colorado, on December 7, 1919. In 1919, the family moved to Warrensburg, Missouri, where his father became a church [sic]. In the sixth grade, Hollyman published a school paper. Hollyman later said that he "always wanted to be journalist". When he was older, Hollyman did typesetting at the Standard Herald newspaper in Warrensburg in exchange for lessons in news-writing. His school activities included being a bandmaster and a member of a novelty music show.

As a high school senior, he worked his way to the United Kingdom on a German steamship, playing in a five-piece jazz band. Once in the UK, Hollyman bicycled from London to Edinburgh and back.

While attending college at Central Missouri State University, Hollyman freelanced for The Daily Star-Journal and the St. Louis Post Dispatch, working with a Speed Graphic camera. On one job, the Kansas City Journal sent him to photograph a married brother and sister. The young couple, separated at birth, did not realize that they were siblings until after their marriage. The photo of the young woman weeping in her doorway was Hollyman's first published photograph. He later remarked that the photo, "smeared over the front page of the Journal, syndicated nationally and ending up in Life Magazine, made me wince at my shameful effort even though it launched my career."

Hollyman graduated from Central Missouri in 1940 with a degree in English, economics and social studies. He obtained his master's degree in photojournalism from the University of Missouri, one of the first two graduates in that field.

Hollyman's first job was with the Chicago bureau of ACME Newspictures, the forerunner of the wire service photography division of the Associated Press. He later became a staff photographer for the St. Louis Post Dispatch, where he worked until World War II.

== Air Force Intelligence ==
In 1941 Hollyman entered the United States Army Air Forces and was stationed in The Pentagon to help set up a photo intelligence project. Among many other duties, he was assigned to be the official service photographer covering President Franklin D. Roosevelt’s funeral in Washington. He rode with the press corps on the president’s funeral train which slowly carried Roosevelt’s body overnight, to his interment in Hyde Park, NY.

Hollyman served as officer in charge of Yank, the Army Weekly in Okinawa, and helped set up Yank and the Stars and Stripes newspaper in Tokyo. His USAAF colleagues included Herblock, the future political cartoonist, and writers John Hersey, Roger Angell, and Andy Rooney. Hollyman also photographed Nagasaki after it was bombed by the United States.

== Holiday Magazine ==
After the war, Hollyman became the first staff photographer for Holiday Magazine, a position he held for several years. Working for director Frank Zachery, Hollyman produced over 1000 pages of travel journalism in Europe and the U.S for Holliday.

IN 1946, Hollyman married fashion photographer Jean Burnes, who would and the two of them started working together on his assignments. They were among the first photographers to shoot small-format color photography for magazines. Hollyman eventually became the photo editor at Holiday.

The couple's first joint assignment for Holiday Magazine came during their honeymoon in 1946, when they were sent to Bermuda. The new bride found herself stringing together a hard-wire cable necklace of some 40 flashbulbs to light up a seaside cavern for which the exposure was calculated manually. "We never worked so hard in our lives," Burnes later told the Bridgeport Post. "We did thirty pages of pictures in two weeks flat."

For the next five years, the magazine sent Hollyman and Burnes on assignments in Europe, Latin America and the U.S.

== Advertising ==
In 1950, Burnes left work to raise two children. Hollyman continued working freelance. The family lived in Weston, Connecticut, then moved to Puerto Rico in 1957.

After advertising executive David Ogilvie saw Hollyman's photography in Holiday, he hired him to produce ad campaigns for Mercedes-Benz, the Commonwealth of Puerto Rico, P & O company and other accounts. Hollyman's 1966 photos of Pablo Casals walking down the beach in Puerto Rico with an umbrella won awards.

In 1963, Hollyman and Burnes divorced.

== Lord of the Flies ==
In 1963, Hollyman worked as the Director of Photography for the Lord of the Flies film. Hollyman had met director Peter Brook in Puerto Rico. Brook had come to the island to scout locations for the film. According to Hollyman, the two men had an extended but intense conversation about film, the Lord of the Flies novel, photography and even philosophy

Brook hired Hollyman even though he had never used a movie camera. According to Hollyman, there was no artificial lighting; Hollyman shot the film in natural light in a rough documentary fashion, thoroughly non-Hollywood style...like news photography.

Lord of the Flies became a critical success. It was lauded at Cannes Film Festival as a "seminal film of the New American Cinema and a fascinating anti-Hollywood experiment in location film-making."

== Later projects ==
After the Lord of the Flies, Hollyman embarked on a variety of projects. He served as Executive Producer for a national educational television five-part series the "Population Explosion", which won awards in 1965. Hollyman also wrote, directed and shot a 30-minute travel documentary for the Kingdom of Jordan’s World Fair exhibit; produced short films for ENIT, the Italian State Tourism Board; and filmed and directed commercials.

As a consultant to Encyclopædia Britannica, Hollyman produced a short film, 5000 Brains, that described the new version of the encyclopaedia and how information had been stored and retrieved for ages. He wrote and produced a book, The Oilmen, on the oil industry. Hollyman also photographed annual reports for Morgan Bank, Hewlett-Packard, Greyhound Lines and Champion International Paper.

In 1966, Hollyman married Audrey Bingham.

From 1969 to 1971, Hollyman served as President for the American Society of Magazine Photographers. After that, he served on the ASMP President's Advisory Council and Advisory Board. Hollyman was instrumental in leading ASMP's efforts to revise copyright laws in favor of photographers.

In 1985, Hollyman's second wife Audrey died.

Hollyman photographed extensive stories for Town and Country Magazine with his former photo editor from Holiday Magazine, Frank Zachary. In 1992 he spent six months working on assignment to create a photo essay that commemorated the voyages of Christopher Columbus to America. Hollyman brought direct descendants of conquistadors and Native Americans to historic sites in the Southern Hemisphere. The essay was later published as a book.

== Retirement ==
In 2006, Hollyman moved from New York to Austin, Texas to be closer to his family.

Hollyman's last photography show, entitled "Chromes", was held in Austin, Texas.

Hollyman died in 2009. He was survived by his son Burnes St.Patrick Hollyman; his daughter Stephenie, also a photographer; and three grandchildren: Anna-Margaret, Helen and Mary Louise.
