= Norman R. "Bud" Poile Trophy =

US ice hockey award

- Sport: Ice hockey
- Awarded for: Western Conference champions of the American Hockey League

History
- First award: 2001–02 AHL season
- Most recent: Grand Rapids Griffins (2025–26)

The Norman R. "Bud" Poile Trophy is presented annually to the American Hockey League (AHL) team that finishes with the best regular season record in the Western Conference. The award is named after former Hockey Hall of Famer Bud Poile. Previously, it was awarded to winner of the West Division (2002–2003), and Midwest Division (2012–2015).

== Winners ==
Total awards won
Wins	Team
5	Grand Rapids Griffins
4	Chicago Wolves
3	Milwaukee Admirals
1	Calgary Wranglers
1	Coachella Valley Firebirds
1	Colorado Eagles
1	Bakersfield Condors
1	Hamilton Bulldogs
1	Houston Aeros
1	Manitoba Moose
1	Omaha Ak-Sar-Ben Knights
1	Ontario Reign
1	Rochester Americans
1	San Jose Barracuda
1	Tucson Roadrunners

=== Winner by season ===
Awarded for	Season	Team	Win
Western Division champion	2001–02	Grand Rapids Griffins	1
Western Division champion	2002–03	Houston Aeros	1
Western Conference champion	2003–04	Milwaukee Admirals	1
Western Conference champion	2004–05	Rochester Americans	1
Western Conference champion	2005–06	Grand Rapids Griffins	2
Western Conference champion	2006–07	Omaha Ak-Sar-Ben Knights	1
Western Conference champion	2007–08	Chicago Wolves	1
Western Conference champion	2008–09	Manitoba Moose	1
Western Conference champion	2009–10	Hamilton Bulldogs	1
Western Conference champion	2010–11	Milwaukee Admirals	2
Midwest Division champion	2011–12	Chicago Wolves	2
Midwest Division champion	2012–13	Grand Rapids Griffins	3
Midwest Division champion	2013–14	Chicago Wolves	3
Midwest Division champion	2014–15	Grand Rapids Griffins	4
Western Conference champion	2015–16	Ontario Reign	1
Western Conference champion	2016–17	San Jose Barracuda	1
Western Conference champion	2017–18	Tucson Roadrunners	1
Western Conference champion	2018–19	Bakersfield Condors	1
Western Conference champion	2019–20	Milwaukee Admirals	3
Western Conference champion	2020–21	Not awarded; no conferences	
Western Conference champion	2021–22	Chicago Wolves	4
Western Conference champion	2022–23	Calgary Wranglers	1
Western Conference champion	2023–24	Coachella Valley Firebirds	1
Western Conference champion	2024–25	Colorado Eagles	1
Western Conference champion	2025–26	Grand Rapids Griffins	5

== See also ==
- Norman R. "Bud" Poile Trophy (IHL)
