= Atchison Globe =

- Type: Weekly newspaper
- Owners: CherryRoad Media; (2023–present)
- Publisher: Stacey Hill
- Editor: Steve Booher
- Founded: 1877; 149 years ago
- Headquarters: 308 Commercial St, Atchison, KS 66002
- Circulation: 1,806
- OCLC number: 8808079
- Website: atchisonglobenow.com

The Atchison Globe is a weekly newspaper published in Atchison, Kansas that was founded in 1877 by E. W. Howe. Also having an online presence, it was acquired in 2023 by CherryRoad Media.

== History ==
After acquiring it from the Howe family in 1951, publisher Paul Allingham and Winnie Allingham sold the journal in 1979 to Thomson Newspapers. Purchased in 1993 by American Publishing, it was owned by News-Press & Gazette Company until August 1, 2023, when it was sold to CherryRoad Media.

In 1989, its publisher, Larry Sarvey, was murdered at his home after being shot twice by a shotgun. The case was never solved.
