= KUNA-LD =

Television station in Indio, California

- Indio–Palm Springs, California; United States
- City: Indio, California
- Channels: Digital: 15 (UHF); Virtual: 15
- Branding: Telemundo 15; KUNA-TV Noticias (newscasts)

Programming
- Affiliations: Telemundo

Ownership
- Owner: News-Press & Gazette Company; (Gulf-California Broadcast Company)

History
- Founded: May 15, 1996
- Former call signs: K15EI (1996–2003); KUNA-LP (2003–2022)
- Former channel numbers: Analog: 15 (UHF, 2003–2022)
- Former affiliations: Silent (July–December 2021)
- Call sign meaning: As in the Spanish language word Una for number "One"

Technical information
- Licensing authority: FCC
- Facility ID: 19779
- Class: LD
- ERP: 15 kW
- HAAT: 197.1 m (647 ft)
- Transmitter coordinates: 33°48′8″N 116°13′33″W
- Translator(s): KPSP-CD 15.1 Cathedral City; KESQ-TV 15.2 Palm Springs

Links
- Public license information: LMS
- Website: kesq.com/kuna

KUNA-LD (channel 15) is a low-power television station licensed to Indio, California, United States, serving the Coachella Valley as an affiliate of the Spanish-language network Telemundo. It is owned by the News-Press & Gazette Company alongside ABC affiliate KESQ-TV (channel 42), Class A CBS affiliate KPSP-CD (channel 38), Class A Fox affiliate KDFX-CD (channel 33.2), CW affiliate KCWQ-LD (channel 2), and independent station KYAV-LD (channel 12). The six stations share studios on Dunham Way in Thousand Palms; KUNA-LD's transmitter is located in the Indio Hills.

In addition to its own digital signal, the station is simulcast in high definition on KPSP's second digital subchannel, and in standard definition on KESQ's eighth digital subchannel. Both KPSP and KESQ transmit from Edom Hill northeast of Cathedral City and I-10.

== History ==
KUNA-LD signed on the air originally as K15EI on May 15, 1996, and then switched call letters to KUNA-LP on March 31, 2003. The station filed a license to cover application for digital operations on December 14, 2021. The digital license was issued on February 4, 2022, with the station changing its call sign to KUNA-LD.

== Subchannel ==
Subchannel of KUNA-LD
Channel	Res.	Short name	Programming
15.1	1080i	TELE-HD	Telemundo

== See also ==
- KESQ-TV
- KDFX-CD
