= Peter Daut =

American journalist (born 1983)

- Born: September 18, 1983 (age 42); Torrance, California, U.S.
- Education: University of Southern California
- Occupations: Journalist, news anchor, investigative reporter
- Years active: 2000s–present
- Employer: KESQ-TV (2020–present)
- Awards: Six Emmy Awards; Edward R. Murrow Award; California Golden Quill Award

Peter Daut (born September 18, 1983) is an American journalist who has been an anchor and investigative reporter at KESQ-TV in Palm Springs, California, since February 2020.

He was born in Torrance, California, grew up in Placentia and graduated from El Dorado High School. Daut then attended the University of Southern California, and graduated cum laude with double degrees in broadcast journalism and political science. He also minored in Spanish.

Prior to joining KESQ-TV, Daut anchored at KCBS-TV in Los Angeles.

He is the recipient of six Emmy Awards, an Edward R. Murrow Award, and a California Golden Quill Award.
