= Channel 38 virtual TV stations in the United States =

The following television stations operate on virtual channel 38 in the United States:

- K04QR-D in Esparto, California
- K14QU-D in Grand Junction, Colorado
- K14RK-D in Phoenix, Arizona
- K23PL-D in Shonto, Arizona
- K24NS-D in Stateline, Nevada
- K28NV-D in Ponca City, Oklahoma
- K28PQ-D in Saint Cloud, Minnesota
- K31OL-D in Salinas, California
- K32NN-D in Joplin, Montana
- K34PG-D in Payson, Arizona
- K36NN-D in West Plains, Missouri
- K36OD-D in North La Pine, Oregon
- KACN-LP in Anchorage, Alaska
- KALO in Honolulu, Hawaii
- KASN in Pine Bluff, Arkansas
- KBIS-LD in Turlock, California
- KCNS in San Francisco, California
- KHWB-LD in Eugene, Oregon
- KJCS-LD in Colorado Springs, Colorado
- KKEI-CD in Portland, Oregon
- KMCI-TV in Lawrence, Kansas
- KPJR-TV in Greeley, Colorado
- KPMR in Santa Barbara, California
- KPSP-CD in Cathedral City, California
- KSCC in Corpus Christi, Texas
- KSCE in El Paso, Texas
- KXHG-LD in Sunnywide, Washington
- KZHO-LD in Houston, Texas
- W16DV-D in Alexander City, Alabama
- W16EB-D in Augusta, Kentucky
- W17DZ-D in Sister Bay, Wisconsin
- W34EY-D in Huntsville, Alabama
- WADL in Mount Clemens, Michigan
- WAWV-TV in Terre Haute, Indiana
- WBEH-CD in Miami, Florida
- WCPX-TV in Chicago, Illinois
- WDSS-LD in Syracuse, New York
- WEIJ-LD in Fort Wayne, Indiana
- WEPX-TV in Greenville, North Carolina
- WHDO-CD in Orlando, Florida
- WIGL-LD in Athens, Georgia
- WJGN-CD in Chesapeake, Virginia
- WJWN-TV in San Sebastian, Puerto Rico
- WKMR in Morehead, Kentucky
- WLTZ in Columbus, Georgia
- WMUB-LD in Warner Robins, Georgia
- WMWD-LD in Madison, Wisconsin
- WNEH in Greenwood, South Carolina
- WNGN-LD in Troy, New York
- WNOL-TV in New Orleans, Louisiana
- WNXG-LD in Tallahassee, Florida
- WPNE-TV in Green Bay, Wisconsin
- WPXR-TV in Roanoke, Virginia
- WPXU-LD in Amityville, New York
- WPYM-LD in Little Rock, Arkansas
- WSBK-TV in Boston, Massachusetts
- WSWB in Scranton, Pennsylvania
- WTSJ-LD in Milwaukee, Wisconsin
- WTTA in St. Petersburg, Florida
- WWXY-LD in San Juan, Puerto Rico

The following stations, which are no longer licensed, formerly operated on virtual channel 38:

- K24NL-D in Weed, California
- K29MM-D in Billings, Montana
- K36NJ-D in Monett, Missouri
- K38OF-D in Crowley, Louisiana
- K38OR-D in Jonesboro, Arkansas
- KCIO-LD in Ontario, California
- KNDX-LD in Dickinson, North Dakota
- KVFW-LD in Fort Worth, Texas
- KZMD-LD in Lufkin, Texas
- W38EM-D in Albany, Georgia
- WALM-LD in Sebring, Florida
- WFKB-LD in Midland, Michigan
