= Channel 33 virtual TV stations in the United States =

The following television stations operate on virtual channel 33 in the United States:

- K08QN-D in Golden Valley, Arizona
- K25QK-D in Anchorage, Alaska
- K31NR-D in Overton, Nevada
- K33EJ-D in Walla Walla, Washington
- K33HH-D in Redding, California
- K33IX-D in Rock Springs, Wyoming
- K33LN-D in Minneapolis, Minnesota
- K33MD-D in Yuma, Arizona
- K33MN-D in Jefferson City, Missouri
- K33QH-D in San Angelo, Texas
- K33QP-D in Corpus Christi, Texas
- K34LK-D in Beaumont, Texas
- KAJS-LD in Lincoln, Nebraska
- KBGU-LD in St. Louis, Missouri
- KBSE-LD in Boise, etc., Idaho
- KCPN-LD in Amarillo, Texas
- KCSO-LD in Sacramento, California
- KDAF in Dallas, Texas
- KDFX-CD in Indio/Palm Springs, California
- KDJT-CD in Salinas, California
- KDMD in Anchorage, Alaska
- KEGW-CD in Siloam Springs, Arkansas
- KEMY-LD in Eureka, California
- KGEW-LD in Port Arthur, Texas
- KHMF-LD in Fort Smith, Arkansas
- KHSB-LD in Steamboat Springs, Colorado
- KJEO-LD in Fresno, California
- KMMW-LD in Stockton, California
- KMSS-TV in Shreveport, Louisiana
- KMUM-CD in Sacramento, California
- KPKN-LD in Tyler, Texas
- KQCK in Cheyenne, Wyoming
- KQDK-CD in Denver, Colorado
- KQSX-LD in Cal - Oregon, California
- KQZY-LD in Victoria, Texas
- KRPC-LP in Rapid City, South Dakota
- KRTN-TV in Durango, Colorado
- KSCW-DT in Wichita, Kansas
- KSPR-LD in Springfield, Missouri
- KSUD-LD in Salt Lake City, Utah
- KTAS in San Luis Obispo, California
- KTVW-DT in Phoenix, Arizona
- KTXU-LD in West Lake Hills, Texas
- KVCW in Las Vegas, Nevada
- KVVB-LD in Lucerne Valley, California
- KWPX-TV in Bellevue, Washington
- KWRW-LD in Oklahoma City, Oklahoma
- W19DB-D in Franklin, North Carolina
- W20EK-D in Andrews, etc., North Carolina
- W20EU-D in Chambersburg, Pennsylvania
- W28EE-D in Canton, etc., North Carolina
- W29DE-D in Hayesville, North Carolina
- W31AN-D in Murphy, North Carolina
- W31DH-D in Franklin, etc., North Carolina
- W31EH-D in Springfield, Illinois
- W31EJ-D in Tutu, St Thomas, U.S. Virgin Islands
- W31EV-D in Wausau, Wisconsin
- W32FH-D in St. Petersburg, Florida
- W33CY-D in Anasco, Puerto Rico
- W33EB-D in Olive Hill, Tennessee
- W33EH-D in Black Mountain, North Carolina
- W33EP-D in Key West, Florida
- W33EU-D in Athens, Georgia
- W33EV-D in Waycross, Georgia
- W34FE-D in Parkersburg, West Virginia
- W35CK-D in Highlands, North Carolina
- W35CO-D in Burnsville, North Carolina
- WBFS-TV in Miami, Florida
- WCAC-LD in Lagrange, Georgia
- WETK in Burlington, Vermont
- WFBI-LD in South East Memphis, Tennessee
- WFRZ-LD in Montgomery, Alabama
- WFXV in Utica, New York
- WHBR in Pensacola, Florida
- WIRE-CD in Atlanta, Georgia
- WISE-TV in Fort Wayne, Indiana
- WITF-TV in Harrisburg, Pennsylvania
- WJGC-LD in Jacksonville, North Carolina
- WJLP in Middletown Township, New Jersey
- WJPM-TV in Florence, South Carolina
- WMPX-LD in Dennis, Massachusetts
- WNBD-LD in Grenada, Mississippi
- WOHO-CD in Holland, Michigan
- WOWZ-LD in Salisbury, Maryland
- WQDE-LD in Indianapolis, Indiana
- WQDT-LD in New Orleans, Louisiana
- WRME-LD in Chicago, Illinois
- WSES in Tuscaloosa, Alabama
- WSHM-LD in Springfield, Massachusetts
- WTVZ-TV in Norfolk, Virginia
- WUJF-LD in Jacksonville, Florida
- WUNF-TV in Asheville, North Carolina
- WVLA-TV in Baton Rouge, Louisiana
- WVPB-TV in Huntington, West Virginia
- WXCK-LD in Chiefland, Florida
- WYTV in Youngstown, Ohio
- WZPA-LD in Philadelphia, Pennsylvania

The following stations, which are no longer licensed, formerly operated on virtual channel 33:

- K33LF-D in Lewiston, Montana
- K34PO-D in Billings, Montana
- KKOM-LD in Lufkin, Texas
- KMAS-LD in Denver, Colorado
- KTDS-LD in Ted's Place, Colorado
- W19DD-D in Brevard, North Carolina
- W42DF-D in Cashiers, North Carolina
- W46AX-D in Bryson City, North Carolina
- W47DM-D in Cullowhee, North Carolina
- WBXG-LD in Gainesville, Florida
- WUCU-LD in Evansville, Indiana
