= Channel 42 TV stations in Canada =

The following television stations formerly broadcast on digital or analog channel 42 in Canada:

- CBXT-DT in Edmonton, Alberta
- CFSK-DT in Saskatoon, Saskatchewan
- CFTF-DT-1 in Edmundston, New Brunswick
- CHNB-DT-14 in Charlottetown, Prince Edward Island
- CITS-DT-1 in Ottawa, Ontario
- CKCO-TV-3 in Oil Springs-Sarnia, Ontario
- CKVP-DT in Fonthill, Ontario
