= Channel 42 virtual TV stations in the United States =

The following television stations operate on virtual channel 42 in the United States:

- K07IT-D in West Glacier, etc., Montana
- K14HT-D in Walla Walla, etc., Washington
- K14NI-D in Ferndale, Montana
- K17FE-D in Wadena, Minnesota
- K27NA-D in Shreveport, Louisiana
- K28DD-D in Bemidji, Minnesota
- K29LS-D in Calexico, California
- K30FZ-D in Willmar, Minnesota
- K32FY-D in Park Rapids, Minnesota
- K32IJ-D in Cortez, Colorado
- K42IM-D in Minot, North Dakota
- K42IQ-D in Flagstaff, Arizona
- KABI-LD in Snyder, Texas
- KARZ-TV in Little Rock, Arkansas
- KAXX-LD in San Antonio, Texas
- KBZC-LD in Oklahoma City, Oklahoma
- KCMN-LD in Kansas City, Missouri
- KESQ-TV in Palm Springs, California
- KEYE-TV in Austin, Texas
- KGLA-DT in Hammond, Louisiana
- KLNM-LD in Lufkin, Texas
- KMLM-DT in Odessa, Texas
- KPTM in Omaha, Nebraska
- KPXG-LD in Portland, Oregon
- KSAX in Alexandria, Minnesota
- KSBO-CD in San Luis Obispo, California
- KTMF-LD in Kalispell, Montana
- KTNC-TV in Concord, California
- KUVE-CD in Tucson, Arizona
- KVBI-CD in Clarkston, Washington
- KVEW in Kennewick, Washington
- KVPA-LD in Phoenix, Arizona
- W09DL-D in Mount Vernon, Illinois
- W15EA-D in Memphis, Tennessee
- W24DL-D in Saginaw, Michigan
- W27EH-D in Hattiesburg, Mississippi
- W28EU-D in Macon, Georgia
- WBOC-LD in Cambridge, Maryland
- WCLJ-TV in Bloomington, Indiana
- WEIQ in Mobile, Alabama
- WIAT in Birmingham, Alabama
- WIRS in Yauco, Puerto Rico
- WKOB-LD in New York, New York
- WKWT-LD in Key West, Florida
- WLLC-LD in Nashville, Tennessee
- WNGX-LD in Schenectady, New York
- WNIB-LD in Rochester, New York
- WSJU-LD in Ceiba, Puerto Rico
- WSJZ-LD in Salisbury, Maryland
- WTHC-LD in Atlanta, Georgia
- WTVI in Charlotte, North Carolina
- WXEL-TV in West Palm Beach, Florida

The following stations, which are no longer licensed, formerly operated on virtual channel 42:

- K15MA-D in Cottonwood, etc., Idaho
- K19MB-D in Mountain Home, Idaho
- K22DO-D in Granite Falls, Minnesota
- K24NN-D in Twin Falls, Idaho
- K33PW-D in Moses Lake, Washington
- K42JB-D in Wyola, Montana
- K42JQ-D in Redding, California
- KCDL-LD in Boise, Idaho
- KIDZ-LD in Abilene, Texas
- WPBO in Portsmouth, Ohio
