= KESQ-TV =

Television station in Palm Springs, California

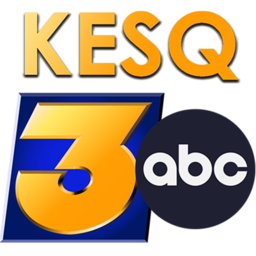
- Palm Springs, California; United States
- Channels: Digital: 28 (UHF); Virtual: 42
- Branding: NewsChannel 3 (cable channel)

Programming
- Affiliations: 42.1: ABC; 42.2: CBS; 33.2: Fox; 15.1: Telemundo; 2.3: CW+

Ownership
- Owner: News-Press & Gazette Company; (Gulf-California Broadcast Company)
- Sister stations: KDFX-CD; KCWQ-LD; KUNA-LD; KPSP-CD; KYAV-LD; KUNA-FM

History
- First air date: October 5, 1968
- Former call signs: KPLM-TV (1968–1978)
- Former channel numbers: Analog: 42 (UHF, 1968–2009); Digital: 52 (UHF, 2005–2009), 42 (UHF, 2009–2019)
- Call sign meaning: Station was formerly owned by Esquire magazine

Technical information
- Licensing authority: FCC
- Facility ID: 25577
- ERP: 100 kW
- HAAT: 189 m (620 ft)
- Transmitter coordinates: 33°51′58.1″N 116°26′5″W
- Translator(s): see § Translators

Links
- Public license information: Public file; LMS
- Website: kesq.com

KESQ-TV (channel 42, cable channel 3) is a television station licensed to Palm Springs, California, United States, serving as the ABC affiliate for the Coachella Valley. It is owned by the News-Press & Gazette Company (NPG) alongside five low-power stations: CBS affiliate KPSP-CD (channel 38), Fox affiliate KDFX-CD (channel 33), CW+ affiliate KCWQ-LD (channel 2), Telemundo affiliate KUNA-LD (channel 15), and independent station KYAV-LD (channel 12). The six stations share studios on Dunham Way in Thousand Palms; KESQ-TV's transmitter is located on Edom Hill northeast of Cathedral City and I-10.

Along with other major Coachella Valley television stations, KESQ-TV identifies itself on-air using its cable designation, channel 3, because of the exceptionally high cable penetration rate in the area.

== History ==
=== KPLM-TV ===
On June 1, 1966, Pacific Media Corporation filed an application for a construction permit to build a new television station to operate on channel 27 in Palm Springs. Three months after Pacific filed, the Federal Communications Commission issued a report and order changing the allocation to channel 42, a move necessitated to avoid interference to channel 28 in Los Angeles. Channel 42 received another bid in December, when Palm Springs Communications Corporation, co-owned with local radio station KCMJ, filed for a station. After Palm Springs Communications reached a settlement agreement with Pacific Media, the latter was awarded the permit on October 11, 1967. The new station took the call letters KPLM-TV and immediately began construction and talks with the major networks on affiliation.

Channel 42 set up shop in the Smoke Tree Village shopping center, the station joined the ABC network and secured channel 3 on all the cable systems in the area for its debut on October 5, 1968. KPLM-TV was the only television station in Palm Springs for just three weeks. In parallel with the battle for channel 42, channel 36 was also contested; on the morning of October 26, NBC affiliate KMIR-TV began broadcasting.

Channel 42 was not an immediate financial success. In 1972, Cine-Prime, a company engaged in educational television production and distribution, announced that it had purchased the station, though no transfer of control was ever filed. In 1973, Pacific attempted to sell KPLM-TV to Ralph Andrews Productions, which was scrapped several months later. In February 1974, Smoke Tree Village filed to evict KPLM-TV from its studios for not paying six months of rent. Ultimately, in 1975, Pacific Media Corporation filed for Chapter 11 bankruptcy reorganization, and the principals of a Palm Springs law firm were appointed as receivers; the studios were relocated to Cathedral City.

=== Esquire years ===
In late 1977, negotiations were concluded to sell KPLM-TV to Esquire, Inc. The $800,000 purchase marked Esquire's return to broadcasting after owning and selling WQXI radio in Atlanta in the 1960s. The call letters were changed to KESQ-TV on September 18, 1978.

Esquire purchased KECC-TV in El Centro in 1981. It attempted to sell both stations to Cimarron Broadcasting, an Oklahoma group headed by Harry Nilsson, in 1983, but Cimarron lacked the capital to make the purchase, and the deal fell apart in March 1984. However, Esquire, which had become wholly owned by Gulf+Western, was anxious to divest itself of the small-market TV station which the large conglomerate did not want and sold it to Gulf Broadcasting of Dallas, an unrelated concern, two months later; the El Centro station was not included. Gulf was then swallowed by Taft Broadcasting in 1985, when the FCC increased ownership limits on television and radio properties—but KESQ-TV was not included in the transaction, which immediately brought Taft to the limit. Instead, KESQ-TV was sold to E. Grant Fitts, who had been the chairman of the broadcasting division.

=== Expansion under NPG ===
Fitts reached a deal to sell KESQ-TV to its current owner, the News-Press & Gazette Company of St. Joseph, Missouri, for $19.4 million in late 1995.

Under NPG, KESQ-TV's operation expanded to include additional low-power TV stations. KUNA-LP, a Telemundo affiliate, launched in 1997. In 1998, NPG entered into a local marketing agreement to run KDFX-LP, the low-power Fox affiliate in Palm Springs; it started that station's first local newscast. A local affiliate of The WB followed in 2000. In 2012, NPG bought KPSP-CD, the local CBS affiliate. In 2013, KESQ-TV moved into a new state-of-the-art studio in Thousand Palms.

While in the later years under Fitts, KESQ had briefly run a radio station (920 AM), it returned to the field again when 1400 AM, previously KUNA, was bought by the station and flipped to sports as KESQ at the end of 1997.

In the late 1990s, KESQ-TV flirted with another kind of expansion. In 1996, the station received FCC approval to move its transmitter to a spot in the San Jacinto Mountains, which would have increased its coverage area to include much of western Riverside County and San Bernardino County. Riverside County was looking for a station to increase coverage of the local area beyond what Los Angeles stations offered. However, the problem posed a puzzle to the station. The expanded coverage would be entirely in the Los Angeles television market, and ABC threatened KESQ with disaffiliation were the move to come to fruition and cut into the market of its KABC-TV. The local chapter of the Sierra Club also objected to the site on environmental grounds; these two challenges doomed the proposal.

The station shut down its analog signal on June 12, 2009, as part of the digital television transition in the United States.

== News operation ==
KESQ has generally had the highest-rated local news department in the market, competing against KMIR, since the 1980s. In addition to programs simulcast on KESQ and KPSP, the station airs morning and 10 p.m. newscasts for KDFX-CD, started in 1999, and Spanish-language news airing on KUNA-LD.

In 2018, KPSP's separate local news brand was dropped, and KPSP began simulcasting existing KESQ newscasts.

=== Notable on-air staff ===
- John Coleman – weatherman (1990s)
- Peter Daut – anchor (2020–present)
- Bob Goen – sports reporter (1981–1987)

== Technical information ==
=== Subchannels ===
The station's signal is multiplexed:

Subchannels of KESQ-TV
Channel	Res.	Short name	Programming
42.1	720p	KESQ-DT	ABC
42.2	480i	LCLCBS2	CBS (KPSP-CD) (4:3)
2.3	480i	KCWQ-DT	The CW Plus (KCWQ-LD)
15.2	480i	KUNA-DT	Telemundo (KUNA-LD) (4:3)
33.2	480i	KDFX-DT	Fox (KDFX-CD)

Simulcast of subchannels of another station

KESQ's subchannels consist of high-power, standard-definition multicasts, using other minor channel numbers, of the principal NPG channels.

=== Translators ===
- K29GK-D Twentynine Palms
- K32EM-D Morongo Valley

== See also ==
- Channel 3 branded TV stations in the United States
- Channel 28 digital TV stations in the United States
- Channel 42 virtual TV stations in the United States
