= Channel 33 TV stations in Mexico =

The following television stations broadcast on digital or analog channel 33 in Mexico:

- XEIPN-TDT in Mexico City
- XHACG-TDT in Acapulco, Guerrero
- XHAK-TDT in Hermosillo, Sonora
- XHBU-TDT in Ciudad Jiménez, Chihuahua
- XHCOSL-TDT in Matehuala, San Luis Potosí
- XHCPE-TDT in Perote, Veracruz
- XHCSO-TDT in Ciudad Obregón, Sonora
- XHCTCI-TDT in Culiacán, Sinaloa
- XHCTH-TDT in Ciudad Cuauhtémoc, Chihuahua
- XHCTLM-TDT in Los Mochis, Sinaloa
- XHCTSL-TDT in San Luis Potosí, San Luis Potosí
- XHCTTI-TDT in Tijuana, Baja California
- XHDEH-TDT in Ciudad Delicias, Chihuahua
- XHDGO-TDT in Durango, Durango
- XHGSF-TDT in San Felipe, Guanajuato
- XHJAL-TDT in Guadalajara, Jalisco
- XHJN-TDT in Huajuapan de León, Oaxaca
- XHJUB-TDT in Ciudad Juárez, Chihuahua
- XHLAC-TDT in Lázaro Cárdenas, Michoacán
- XHLAT-TDT in Nuevo Laredo, Tamaulipas
- XHLAV-TDT in La Venta, Tabasco
- XHLL-TDT in Villahermosa, Tabasco
- XHLLO-TDT in Saltillo, Coahuila
- XHMAS-TDT in Celaya, Guanajuato
- XHMEY-TDT in Mérida, Yucatán
- XHMTCO-TDT in Monclova, Coahuila
- XHNAC-TDT in Naco, Sonora
- XHOR-TDT in Matamoros, Tamaulipas
- XHPCE-TDT in Puerto Escondido, Oaxaca
- XHPES-TDT in Puerto Peñasco, Sonora
- XHPNW-TDT in Piedras Negras, Coahuila
- XHSTV-TDT in Santiago Tuxtla, Veracruz
- XHTFL-TDT in Tepic, Nayarit
- XHVCA-TDT in Cerro Azul, Veracruz
