= KUNA-FM =

Regional Mexican radio station in La Quinta, California, United States

- La Quinta, California; United States
- Broadcast area: Palm Springs, California
- Frequency: 96.7 MHz
- Branding: La Poderosa 96.7

Programming
- Format: Regional Mexican

Ownership
- Owner: News-Press & Gazette Company; (Gulf-California Broadcast Company)
- Sister stations: KUNA-LD, KESQ-TV, KPSP-CD

History
- First air date: August 1987
- Former call signs: KBZT-FM (1987–1993)

Technical information
- Licensing authority: FCC
- Facility ID: 52182
- Class: A
- ERP: 970 watts
- HAAT: 177 meters (581 ft)
- Transmitter coordinates: 33°48′8″N 116°13′30″W

Links
- Public license information: Public file; LMS
- Website: kunamundo.com

KUNA-FM (96.7 FM) is a commercial regional Mexican radio station licensed to La Quinta, California, United States, broadcasting to the Palm Springs, California, area. It is owned by News-Press & Gazette Company through its Gulf-California Broadcast Company subsidiary.

== History ==
KBZT-FM "K-Best" signed on the air in August 1987 with a syndicated adult standards format. The call letters had been scooped up on October 2, 1986, from the Los Angeles station that dropped them to become KLSX just days before. On February 17, 1992, KBZT-FM flipped to country music, citing the high popularity of country nationwide and the lack of a local country station on FM.

The country music came to an end on October 1, 1993, when the station became a simulcast with KUNA (1400 AM) as KUNA-FM. The flip came about even though KBZT outrated KUNA at the time.
