= Warrensburg Star-Journal =

Newspaper in Warrensburg, Missouri

- Type: Twice weekly newspaper
- Format: Broadsheet
- Owner: Carpenter Media Group
- Publisher: Jamila Khalil
- Editor: Nicole Cooke
- Founded: 1865 (Warrensburg Journal); 1883 (Johnson County Star)
- Headquarters: 101 E. Market Street, Suite D Warrensburg, Missouri 64093 United States
- Website: warrensburgstarjournal.com

The Warrensburg Star-Journal is a twice weekly newspaper in Johnson County, Missouri.

== History ==
The paper traces its history to the Warrensburg Journal, which began publishing April 17, 1865, by James Douglas Eads—seven days after the end of the American Civil War and two days after the Assassination of Abraham Lincoln. Warrensburg, population of 1,000 at the time, did not have a newspaper. Prior to the war, Eads, a church pastor, had published the Warrensburg Signal. In addition to his pastor and newspaper interests he was also a physician and ran a hotel.

On October 6, 1876, it became the Journal-Democrat after merging with the Warrensburg Democrat, which had started in 1871. In 1907, Wallace Crossley became the publisher. On February 6, 1913, it became the Star-Journal after merging with the Johnson County Star founded in 1883 by J.M. Coe. William and Avis Tucker bought the paper in 1947. William Tucker died in 1966 and Avis owned the paper until 2007 when it was sold to NPG.

Over time, the Daily Star-Journal changed from a daily publication to a weekly publication on Fridays in 2020.

In October 2020, the paper was purchased by the Sedalia Democrat, under parent company Phillips Media Group. At that time, the name was changed from Daily Star-Journal to Star-Journal to reflect its weekly publishing.

In September 2021, the Star-Journal brought back the Tuesday print edition. The Star-Journal's print edition is now published twice a week on Tuesdays and Fridays.

In August 2024, Phillips Media Group sold the newspaper to Carpenter Media Group.

== Notable staff ==
Among its reporters was Bill Dedman, who won a 1989 Pulitzer Prize. Thomas Benton Hollyman was a photographer. James C. Kirkpatrick started his reporting career at the paper.
