= Channel 42 virtual TV stations in Canada =

The following television stations operate on virtual channel 42 in Canada:

- CFTF-DT-1 in Edmundston, New Brunswick
- CHNB-DT-14 in Charlottetown, Prince Edward Island
- CHNM-DT in Vancouver, British Columbia
- CITS-DT-1 in Ottawa, Ontario
- CKVP-DT in Fonthill, Ontario
