= KESQ (AM) =

Radio station in Indio, California (1946–2023)

Former Simulcast of KUNA-FM
- Indio, California; United States
- Frequency: 1400 (kHz)
- Branding: La Poderosa 96.7

Programming
- Language: Spanish
- Format: Defunct (was Mexican music)

Ownership
- Owner: News-Press & Gazette Company; (Gulf-California Broadcast Company)
- Sister stations: part of News-Press & Gazette cluster with KESQ-TV

History
- First air date: 1946
- Last air date: August 5, 2022
- Former call signs: KREO (1946–1976); KRCQ (1976–1986); KUNA (1986–1993); KBZT (1993–1994); KUNA (1994–1997)
- Call sign meaning: Co-owned with KESQ-TV

Technical information
- Licensing authority: FCC
- Facility ID: 52181
- Class: C
- Power: 1,000 watts (unlimited)
- Transmitter coordinates: 33°43′37″N 116°15′10″W

Links
- Public license information: Public file; LMS
- Website: www.kesq.com/la-poderosa

KESQ (1400 AM) was a radio station broadcasting a Spanish music format licensed to Indio, California, United States. The station was a simulcast of KUNA-FM 96.7. KESQ was owned by the News-Press & Gazette Company, through its Gulf-California Broadcast Company subsidiary.

== History ==
The radio station itself began broadcasting in 1946 under the call letters KREO, then changed to KRCQ in 1976 and again in 1984 when it reverted to Spanish language music as KUNA. The radio station was purchased by KESQ-TV in 1992 and changed formats to news/talk, but the station returned to KUNA-FM and the Spanish language music format in 1998, but switched formats in late 2004. Back to being under KUNA-FM but on the AM frequency, before KJOK (KINI-AM named for an earlier radio station in the California Desert in the 1970s) of Yuma, Arizona increased its power in the 2000s and changed dials, KESQ could be heard in Imperial Valley down to Mexicali on occasion, the Morongo Basin closer to Palm Springs, California and partially in the Inland Empire, California region.

KESQ was formerly rented by a Spanish religious radio network by La Iglesia Alfa Y Omega (the Alpha and Omega church), and briefly played Spanish-language religious music. It returned to simulcasting KUNA-FM in 2011.

KESQ went silent on August 5, 2022, after the owner of the station's transmitter site requested the decommissioning of the tower. A deal was soon reached to sell the KESQ license to KGAY PSP, owner of KGAY, for $8,500; the deal was called off in February 2023. Finding that there was no viable path to resuming operation, on February 13, Gulf-California Broadcast Company returned the license to the Federal Communications Commission (FCC), which canceled it on February 21.
