= News-Press & Gazette Company =

American media company

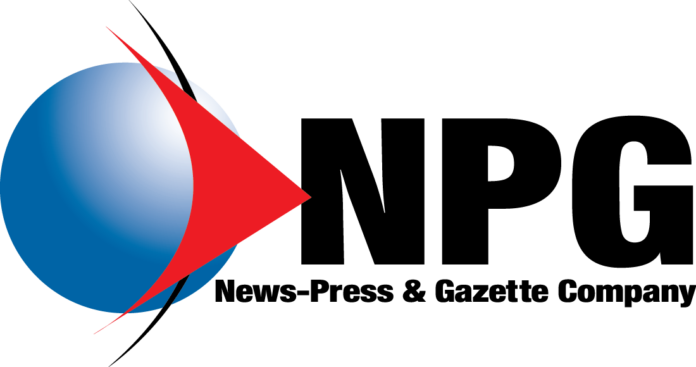
- Type: Private
- Industry: Media
- Founded: 1845 (when St. Joseph Gazette was founded)
- Headquarters: 825 Edmond Street, St. Joseph, Missouri, United States
- Key people: Brian Bradley; (President); David Bradley; (Chief Executive Officer); Henry H. Bradley; (Executive Vice President/CFO)
- Products: Newspapers; Television; Radio
- Owner: Bradley family
- Website: www.npgco.com

The News-Press & Gazette Company (NPG) is an American media company based in St. Joseph, Missouri, wholly owned and operated by the Bradley family. It is presided over by Brian Bradley and David R. Bradley, with Hank Bradley (retired), Eric Bradley, and Kit Bradley serving on its board of directors. All are descendants of family patriarch Henry D. Bradley and his son, David Bradley Sr.

News-Press & Gazette's properties include daily and weekly newspapers in Missouri and Kansas, radio and television stations in California, Idaho, Oregon, Colorado, Arizona, Missouri and Texas. The NPG group generally concentrates on the Kansas City and St. Joseph areas for their newspapers, and the western United States for their broadcasting properties. Many of News-Press & Gazette's television properties are top rated stations in their respective market.

== History ==
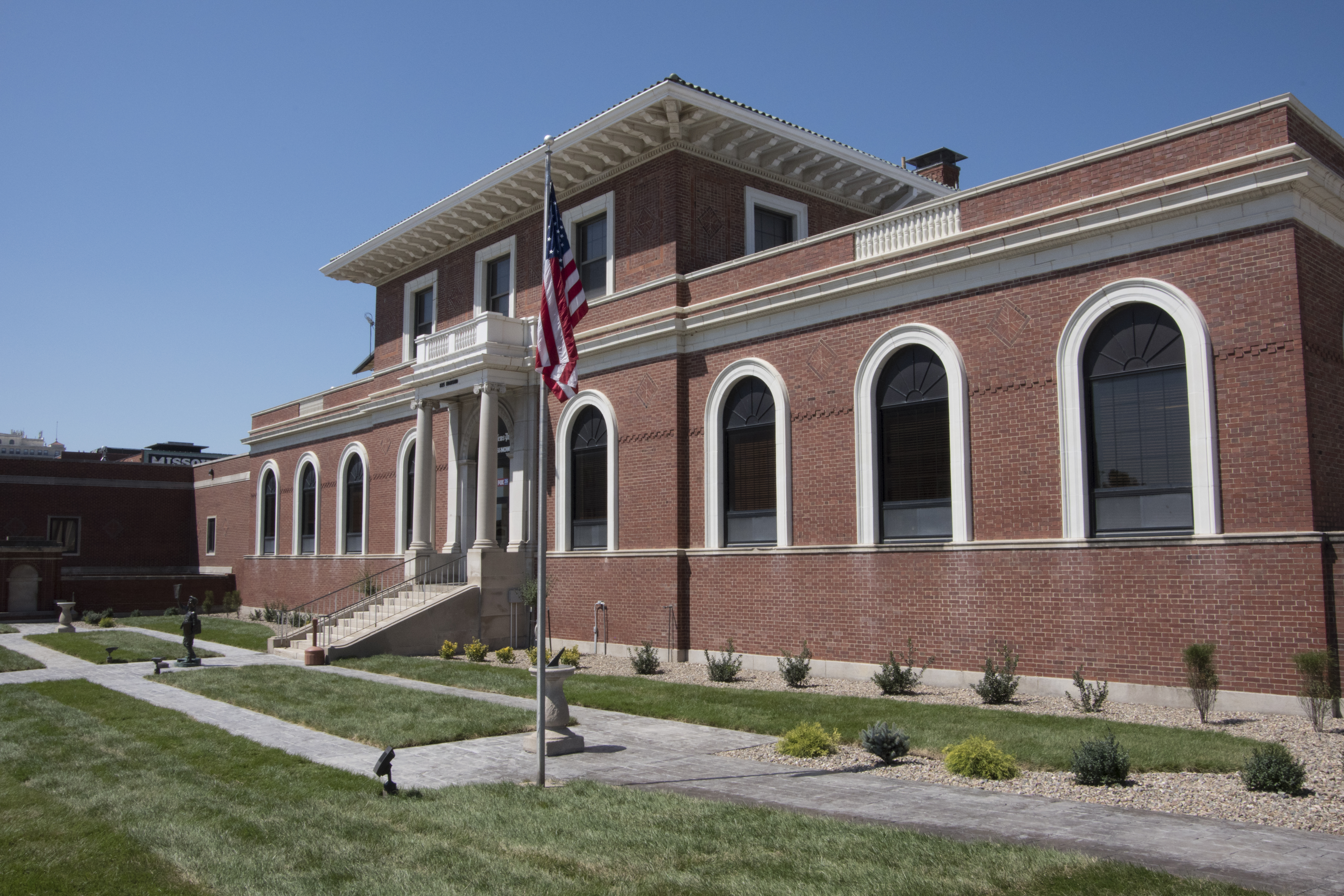
News-Press headquarters in St. Joseph

The company traces it roots back to the St. Joseph Gazette which began publishing in 1845. The paper chronicled much of travel into the Old West along the Oregon Trail and California Trail. It was the only newspaper that was sent west on the first ride of the Pony Express. The Gazette eventually merged with the News-Press by publisher Charles M. Palmer. When Palmer died in 1949, Henry D. Bradley was co-publisher of both papers starting in 1939 and bought them outright in 1951.

The Gazette ceased publication in 1988 when its sister, the afternoon News-Press, transitioned into a morning newspaper; however, the family kept the "Gazette" and "G" in the company name. The Bradley family expanded the focus by forming local cable television operator St. Joseph Cablevision in 1965. News-Press & Gazette expanded into broadcast television with the 1976 with purchase of WSAV-TV in Savannah, Georgia. They would later acquire KAAL-TV in Austin, Minnesota in 1980; WJTV in Jackson, Mississippi in 1983; KSFY in Sioux Falls, South Dakota, in 1985 (and selling off KAAL-TV in the same year); WECT in Wilmington, North Carolina; signing on WJTV satellite station WHLT, Hattiesburg, Mississippi in 1987; and acquiring KOLD-TV Tucson, Arizona in 1989. In 1993, NPG would sell off their first group of stations to other companies, but would rebuild its TV portfolio starting with KVIA-TV in El Paso, Texas. This expansion continued into the 2000s with the launch of a 24-hour cable-only news channel for St. Joseph, News-Press NOW, along with News-Press & Gazette's acquisition of several full-power and low-power television stations; including KESQ-TV Palm Springs, California (and radio stations KESQ (AM) and KUNA-FM); KIFI-TV Idaho Falls, Idaho; KRDO-TV Colorado Springs, Colorado (and radio stations KRDO (AM) and KRDO-FM); KTVZ in Bend, Oregon; KECY-TV in El Centro, California; KEYT-TV Santa Barbara, California; and KION-TV Monterey - Salinas, California.

In 2011, the Bradley family sold the cable division, which by that time expanded its service area to parts of California and Arizona under the name NPG Cable, to Suddenlink Communications. On March 19, 2012, News-Press & Gazette announced it would establish a low-power television station in St. Joseph that would serve as the company's television flagship and the first broadcast station that the company built and signed on; it would be an affiliate of the Fox Broadcasting Company (with subchannel-only affiliations with The CW and Telemundo). The station was created using the K26LV-D station license (which it acquired, along with K16KF-D, from Sunrise, Florida-based DTV America 1, LLC on March 14 of that year); it launched on June 2, 2012, as KNPN-LD. On July 25, 2012, NPG announced an agreement to purchase ABC affiliate KMIZ and Fox affiliate, KQFX-LD from JW Broadcasting. The deal was consummated on November 1.

In October 2020, NPG sold the Daily Star-Journal to Phillips Media Group, owner of the Sedalia Democrat. NPG had owned the paper since 2007 and after the sale its name was changed to the Warrensburg Star-Journal.

In August 2023, NPG sold its commercial printing facility in St. Joseph, Missouri, and all of its newspapers (excluding the St. Joseph News-Press) to CherryRoad Media. The sale included three Kansas papers: the Miami County Republic, the Atchison Globe and the Hiawatha World; and two papers based in Liberty, Missouri: the Courier-Tribune and the Gladstone Dispatch.

In July 2025, NPG announced a partnership with AI monetization platform Dappier to power AI copilots and make its news coverage available across AI-native environments.

== Major assets ==
=== Print ===
==== St. Joseph, Missouri area ====
- St. Joseph News-Press (St. Joseph, Missouri; flagship newspaper)
- Save NOW (St. Joseph, Missouri)

=== Television ===
Stations are arranged alphabetically by state and by city of license. In all, NPG owns or operates 28 television properties, nearly all in the western United States.

- (**) – Indicates that it was built and signed on by NPG.

Media market	State	Station	Purchased	Affiliation	Notes
Yuma	Arizona	KECY-TV	2008	Fox/MyNetworkTV; ABC (DT2); The CW (DT3); Telemundo (DT4)	
Yuma	Arizona	KYMA-DT	2014	CBS (13.1); NBC (11.1); Ion Television (13.4)	(Note: Owned by Rincon Broadcasting Group.)
Yuma	Arizona	KESE-LD	2008	Telemundo	
Monterey–Salinas	California	KMUV-LD	2013	Telemundo	
Monterey–Salinas	California	KCBA	2021	The CW	(Note: Owned by VistaWest Media, LLC.)
Monterey–Salinas	California	KION-TV	2013	CBS; Fox (DT2)	
Palm Springs–Indio	California	KCWQ-LD **	2006	The CW	
Palm Springs–Indio	California	KYAV-LD	2012	Independent	
Palm Springs–Indio	California	KUNA-LD	1997	Telemundo	
Palm Springs–Indio	California	KDFX-CD	2008	Fox	
Palm Springs–Indio	California	KPSP-CD	2012	CBS	
Palm Springs–Indio	California	KESQ-TV	1996	ABC	
Santa Barbara–Santa Maria–San Luis Obispo	California	KEYT-TV	2012	ABC; CBS (DT2); MyTV (DT3)	
Santa Barbara–Santa Maria–San Luis Obispo	California	KCOY-TV	2013	Telemundo; Fox (DT2); The CW (DT3)	
Santa Barbara–Santa Maria–San Luis Obispo	California	KKFX-CD	2013	Fox	
Colorado Springs	Colorado	KRDO-TV	2006	ABC	
Colorado Springs	Colorado	KTLO-LD	2008	Telemundo	
Idaho Falls–Pocatello	Idaho	KIFI-TV	2005	ABC; CBS (DT2); The CW (DT3); Telemundo (DT5)	
Idaho Falls–Pocatello	Idaho	KIDK	2011	MeTV; Fox (DT2)	
Idaho Falls–Pocatello	Idaho	KXPI-LD	2011	Fox	
Columbia–Jefferson City	Missouri	KMIZ	2012	ABC; MeTV (DT2); MyNetworkTV (DT3); Fox (DT4)	
Columbia–Jefferson City	Missouri	KQFX-LD	2012	Fox	
St. Joseph	Missouri	KNPG-CD **	2012	NBC; The CW (DT2); Telemundo (DT3); Bounce TV (DT4)	
St. Joseph	Missouri	KNPN-CD **	2012	Fox; CBS (DT2); News-Press NOW	
St. Joseph	Missouri	KCJO-CD **	2014	CBS; Telemundo (DT3)	
Bend	Oregon	KTVZ	2007	NBC; The CW (DT2); Fox (DT3)	
Bend	Oregon	KFXO-CD	2007	Fox; Telemundo (DT2)	
Bend	Oregon	KQRE-LD	2007	Telemundo; Fox (DT2)	
El Paso	Texas	KVIA-TV	1995	ABC; The CW (DT2); Ion Television (DT3)	
El Paso	Texas	K22NM-D	—N/a	NBC	(Note: Owned by Hubbard Broadcasting.)

=== Radio ===
Media market	State	Station	Purchased	Current format	Notes
Colorado Springs	Colorado	KRDO	2006	Talk radio	
Colorado Springs	Colorado	KRDO-FM	2015	Talk radio	(Note: NPG took over management of the Local Marketing Agreement (LMA) of KSKX/KRDO-FM from Pikes Peak Broadcasting Company in 2006.)
Palm Springs	California	KUNA-FM	1997	Regional Mexican	

=== Cable channel ===
- News-Press NOW (Note: Previously owned from 2005 to 2011, sold to Suddenlink Communications as part of its purchase of NPG's cable division but was reacquired by NPG in May 2012. It was originally operated as a cable-only channel prior to June 2, 2012.)

== Former assets ==
=== Print ===
- Atchison Daily Globe (Atchison, Kansas)
- Courier-Tribune (Liberty, Missouri)
- The Daily Star-Journal (Warrensburg, Missouri)
- Gladstone Dispatch (Gladstone, Missouri)
- Green Acres (St. Joseph, Missouri)
- Hiawatha World (Hiawatha, Kansas)
- Louisburg Herald (Louisburg, Kansas)
- Johnson County Sun (Overland Park, Kansas)
- Kansas City Nursing News (Overland Park, Kansas)
- Kearney Courier (Kearney, Missouri)
- Miami County Republic (Paola, Kansas)
- Osawatomie Graphic (Osawatomie, Kansas)
- Read It Free (Osawatomie, Kansas)
- Read It Free - Northwest Missouri (St. Joseph, Missouri)
- Smithville Herald (Smithville, Missouri)

=== Television ===
Media market	State	Station	Purchased	Sold	Notes
Tucson	Arizona	KOLD-TV	1989	1993	
Yuma	Arizona	KYMA-DT	2014	2020	(Note: Owned by Northwest Broadcasting (and later Cox Media Group), NPG operated KYMA. In 2020, CMG surrendered the license of KYMA, and moved its NBC programming to a subchannel to KSWT, which would subsequently change its callsign to KYMA.) (Note: License for this station was cancelled.)
Grand Junction	Colorado	KJCT	2006	2013	
Grand Junction	Colorado	KKHD-LP	2007	2013	
Savannah	Georgia	WSAV-TV	1976	1993	
Austin–Rochester	Minnesota	KAAL-TV	1980	1985	
Jackson	Mississippi	WJTV	1983	1993	
Hattiesburg	Mississippi	WHLT **	1987	1993	(Note: Semi-satellite of WJTV.)
Wilmington	North Carolina	WECT	1986	1993	
Sioux Falls	South Dakota	KSFY-TV	1985	1993	

=== Radio ===
Media market	State	Station	Purchased	Sold	Notes
Indio–Palm Springs	California	KESQ	1997	2023	

=== Cable operations ===
NPG owned cable systems under the name NPG Cable, Inc.. On November 29, 2010, NPG announced that it had agreed to sell all of its cable systems to Suddenlink Communications for $350 million; the acquisition was closed on April 1, 2011. NPG Cable systems operated in the following communities:

- St. Joseph, Missouri
- Lake Havasu City, Arizona
- Parker, Arizona
- Blythe, California
- Bullhead City, Arizona
- Kingman, Arizona
- Flagstaff, Arizona
- Payson, Arizona
- Sedona, Arizona
- Mammoth Lakes, California
- June Lake, California
- Pine, Arizona
- Strawberry, Arizona
