= Extra TV 42 =

Costa Rican television channel

Extra TV 42 (cable channel 14) was a Costa Rican television channel owned by Diario Extra. Its broadcasts started in 1993.

The channel was noticeably absent from AMNET's cable line-up up until the late 2000s. Its terrestrial microwave network was improved in 2009.

In January 2010, the network fired Richard Molina, who was working for its news service for ten years.

On August 14, 2019, Extra TV started digital broadcasts, in conjunction with the shutdown of analog TV broadcasts in Costa Rica. In September, 2020, Extra TV announced the cessation of its news service after 27 years, effective October 31.

The channel closed on May 31, 2023, alongside the print publication, which was facing a crisis. The channel was one of the assets acquired by Grupo Transcomer, saving the group from its shutdown.
