= Channel 33 low-power TV stations in the United States =

The following low-power television stations broadcast on digital or analog channel 33 in the United States:

- K23KR-D in Alton, Utah
- K33AC-D in Pawnee City, Nebraska
- K33AF-D in Ninilchik, Alaska
- K33CP-D in Gold Beach, Oregon
- K33DB-D in Alexandria, Minnesota
- K33DO-D in Vernal, Utah
- K33DR-D in Montpelier, Idaho
- K33DS-D in Freedom-Etna, Wyoming
- K33EA-D in Columbus, Montana
- K33EB-D in Cedar Canyon, Utah
- K33EJ-D in Walla Walla, Washington
- K33ER-D in Verdi/Mogul, Nevada
- K33FF-D in Wallace, etc., Nebraska
- K33FI-D in Akron, Colorado
- K33FK-D in Angel Fire, New Mexico
- K33FL-D in Las Vegas, New Mexico
- K33FO-D in Benkelman, Nebraska
- K33FS-D in La Grande, Oregon
- K33FT-D in Manti/Ephraim, Utah
- K33FX-D in Heber/Midway, Utah
- K33FY-D in Park City, Utah
- K33GA-D in Grants/Milan, New Mexico
- K33GB-D in Golconda, Nevada
- K33GC-D in Capulin, etc., New Mexico
- K33GF-D in Preston, Idaho
- K33GJ-D in Merlin, Oregon
- K33GM-D in Haxtun, Colorado
- K33GX-D in Springfield, South Dakota
- K33GZ-D in Hawthorne, Nevada
- K33HG-D in Quanah, Texas
- K33HH-D in Redding, California
- K33HO-D in Soda Springs, Idaho
- K33HX-D in Tropic & Cannonville, Utah
- K33HY-D in Basalt, Colorado
- K33IB-D in Silver Springs, Nevada
- K33ID-D in Ridgecrest, California
- K33IM-D in Malad City, Idaho
- K33IW-D in Coaldale, Colorado
- K33IX-D in Rock Springs, Wyoming
- K33IY-D in Le Chee, etc., Arizona
- K33IZ-D in Boulder, Utah
- K33JE-D in Modena/Beryl, etc., Utah
- K33JG-D in Peoa/Oakley, Utah
- K33JI-D in Scofield, Utah
- K33JM-D in Mooreland, etc., Oklahoma
- K33JQ-D in Big Piney, etc., Wyoming
- K33JW-D in Rockville/Springdale, Utah
- K33KD-D in London Springs, Oregon
- K33KE-D in Sargents, Colorado
- K33KF-D in Kanarraville, etc., Utah
- K33KH-D in Nephi, Utah
- K33KI-D in Spring Glen, Utah
- K33KJ-D in Crested Butte, Colorado
- K33KV-D in Lamar, Colorado
- K33KW-D in Delta, etc., Utah
- K33LA-D in Duchesne, Utah
- K33LB-D in Redwood Falls, Minnesota
- K33LG-D in Bridger, etc., Montana
- K33LN-D in Minneapolis, Minnesota
- K33LV-D in Henefer, etc., Utah
- K33LW-D in Sandpoint, Idaho
- K33LZ-D in Myrtle Point, Oregon
- K33MC-D in Forsyth, Montana
- K33MD-D in Yuma, Arizona
- K33MI-D in Aberdeen, South Dakota
- K33MJ-D in Pahrump, Nevada
- K33MN-D in Jefferson City, Missouri
- K33MW-D in Mankato, Minnesota
- K33NM-D in Omak, etc., Washington
- K33NP-D in Russell, Kansas
- K33NT-D in Kanab, Utah
- K33NV-D in Strong City, Oklahoma
- K33NX-D in Carlsbad, New Mexico
- K33NY-D in Roseburg, Oregon
- K33NZ-D in Cottonwood, Arizona
- K33OB-D in Roswell, New Mexico
- K33OD-D in Kingman, Arizona
- K33OE-D in Penasco, New Mexico
- K33OG-D in Max, Minnesota
- K33OH-D in Ferndale, etc., Montana
- K33OI-D in Hanksville, Utah
- K33OJ-D in Garfield, etc., Utah
- K33OK-D in Overton, Nevada
- K33OL-D in Fremont, Utah
- K33OM-D in Caineville, Utah
- K33ON-D in Fort Peck, Montana
- K33OO-D in Antimony, Utah
- K33OP-D in Helena, Montana
- K33OQ-D in Escalante, Utah
- K33OR-D in St. Ignatius, Montana
- K33OT-D in Willmar, Minnesota
- K33OU-D in Fountain Green, Utah
- K33OV-D in Whitehall, Montana
- K33OW-D in Neligh, Nebraska
- K33OX-D in Samak, Utah
- K33OY-D in Blanding/Monticello, Utah
- K33OZ-D in Parowan, Enoch, etc., Utah
- K33PA-D in Sterling, Colorado
- K33PB-D in Grand Junction, Colorado
- K33PC-D in Santa Clara, Utah
- K33PD-D in Toquerville, Hurricane, Utah
- K33PE-D in Truth or Consequences, New Mexico
- K33PF-D in Beaver, etc., Utah
- K33PG-D in Socorro, New Mexico
- K33PH-D in Garrison, etc., Utah
- K33PI-D in Eureka, Nevada
- K33PJ-D in Emery, Utah
- K33PK-D in Green River, Utah
- K33PL-D in Birchdale, Minnesota
- K33PM-D in Grants Pass, Oregon
- K33PN-D in Ferron, Utah
- K33PO-D in Clear Creek, Utah
- K33PQ-D in Manila, etc, Utah
- K33PR-D in Joplin, Montana
- K33PS-D in Randolph, Utah
- K33PU-D in Yuma, Colorado
- K33PV-D in Rock Rapids, Iowa
- K33PX-D in Clarendon, Texas
- K33PZ-D in Julesburg, Colorado
- K33QB-D in Coolin, Idaho
- K33QC-D in Window Rock, Arizona
- K33QD-D in Zuni Pueblo, New Mexico
- K33QF-D in Holbrook, Idaho
- K33QG-D in Cortez, etc., Colorado
- K33QH-D in San Angelo, Texas
- K33QL-D in Snowmass Village, Colorado
- K33QP-D in Corpus Christi, Texas
- K33QS-D in Santa Barbara, etc., California
- K33QU-D in Jacks Peak, New Mexico
- KBSE-LD in Boise, etc., Idaho, an ATSC 3.0 station
- KCCF-LD in Atascadero, California
- KCPN-LD in Amarillo, Texas
- KDFX-CD in Indio/Palm Springs, California
- KDGU-LD in Ulysses, Kansas
- KEMY-LD in Eureka, California
- KGEW-LD in Port Arthur, Texas
- KGKC-LD in Lawrence, Kansas
- KGSC-LD in Cheyenne, Wyoming
- KHMF-LD in Fort Smith, Arkansas
- KHSB-LD in Steamboat Springs, Colorado
- KJEO-LD in Fresno, California
- KJTV-CD in Lubbock, Texas
- KMSX-LD in Sacramento, California
- KNPB in Incline Village, Nevada
- KQHD-LD in Hardin, Montana
- KQSX-LD in Cal - Oregon, California
- KQZY-LD in Victoria, Texas
- KRPC-LP in Rapid City, South Dakota
- KSCW-DT in Wichita, Kansas
- KSSJ-LD in San Antonio, Texas
- KSUD-LD in Salt Lake City, Utah
- KUOC-LD in Enid, Oklahoma
- KVVB-LD in Lucerne Valley, California
- W33DH-D in Eau Claire, Wisconsin
- W33DN-D in Florence, South Carolina
- W33EB-D in Olive Hill, Tennessee
- W33ED-D in Vieques, Puerto Rico
- W33EG-D in Lumberton, Mississippi
- W33EH-D in Black Mountain, North Carolina
- W33EI-D in Raleigh, North Carolina
- W33EJ-D in Moorefield, West Virginia
- W33EL-D in Caguas, Puerto Rico
- W33EM-D in PIttsburgh, Pennsylvania
- W33EP-D in Key West, Florida
- W33ER-D in Augusta, Georgia
- W33ET-D in New York, New York
- W33EU-D in Athens, Georgia
- W33EV-D in Waycross, Georgia
- WBGR-LD in Bangor/Dedham, Maine
- WCAC-LD in Lagrange, Georgia
- WFRZ-LD in Montgomery, Alabama
- WGCT-LD in Tampa, Florida
- WILT-LD in Wilmington, North Carolina
- WIRE-CD in Atlanta, Georgia
- WJAN-CD in Miami, Florida
- WJGC-LD in Jacksonville, North Carolina
- WKXT-LD in Knoxville, Tennessee
- WNBD-LD in Grenada, Mississippi
- WNGS-LD in Greenville, South Carolina
- WNGX-LD in Schenectady, New York
- WNXG-LD in Tallahassee, Florida
- WOCW-LD in Charleston, West Virginia
- WOHO-CD in Holland, Michigan
- WOKZ-CD in Kalamazoo, Michigan
- WORK-LP in Nashua, New Hampshire
- WOWZ-LD in Salisbury, Maryland
- WPDP-CD in Cleveland, Tennessee
- WQHI-LD in Myrtle Beach, South Carolina
- WQIZ-LD in Ashland, Ohio
- WTNG-CD in Lumberton-Pembroke, North Carolina
- WTSG-LD in Tifton, Georgia
- WUJF-LD in Jacksonville, Florida
- WVVC-LD in Utica, New York
- WWHB-CD in Stuart, Florida
- WXCK-LD in Chiefland, Florida

The following low-power stations, which are no longer licensed, formerly broadcast on digital or analog channel 33:

- K33AG in Bend, Oregon
- K33BN in Taos, New Mexico
- K33BV in Fraser, etc., Colorado
- K33CF-D in Wellington, Texas
- K33CQ-D in Canadian, Texas
- K33DI in East Weed, California
- K33DL in Eureka, Utah
- K33DP in Carlin, Nevada
- K33FD in Blythe, California
- K33FW in Rural Beaver, etc., Utah
- K33HD in Starr Valley, Nevada
- K33HP in Samak, Utah
- K33HQ in Wanship, Utah
- K33IC in Topeka, Kansas
- K33JB-D in Orderville, Utah
- K33KC in Wadena, Minnesota
- K33LF-D in Lewiston, Montana
- K33OS-D in Granite Falls, Minnesota
- K33PW-D in Moses Lake, Washington
- K33PY-D in Round Mountain, Nevada
- KKOM-LD in Lufkin, Texas
- KMAS-LD in Denver, Colorado
- KSRW-LP in Mammoth Lakes, etc., California
- KTDS-LD in Ted's Place, Colorado
- W33AD in Concord, Virginia
- W33AL in Brunswick, Georgia
- WBXG-LD in Gainesville, Florida
- WHIG-LP in Rocky Mount, North Carolina
- WUCU-LD in Evansville, Indiana
