= Channel 42 digital TV stations in the United States =

The following television stations broadcast on digital channel 42 in the United States:

- K42DZ-D in Battle Mountain, Nevada, to move to channel 34
- K42IH-D in East Wenatchee, Washington, to move to channel 28
- K42IM-D in Minot, North Dakota, to move to channel 35
- K42IQ-D in Flagstaff, Arizona, to move to channel 21, on virtual channel 42
- W42CK in Hagerstown, Maryland, to move to channel 25, on virtual channel 42

The following stations, which are no longer licensed, formerly broadcast on digital channel 42:

- K42CF-D in Gruver, Texas
- K42CH-D in Capulin, etc., New Mexico
- K42CR-D in Tucumcari, New Mexico
- K42EV-D in Glenwood Springs, Colorado
- K42GN-D in Preston, Idaho
- K42JB-D in Wyola, Montana
- K42JQ-D in Redding, California
- K42KR-D in Mountain View, Wyoming
- K42LH-D in Winston, Oregon
- KIDZ-LD in Abilene, Texas
- KSEX-CD in San Diego, California
- W42AX-D in Bakersville, North Carolina
- W42DF-D in Cashiers, North Carolina
- W42DZ-D in Adjuntas, Puerto Rico
- WMOE-LD in Mobile, Alabama
- WMSY-TV in Marion, Virginia
