= Channel 33 TV stations in Canada =

The following television stations broadcast on digital or analog channel 33 in Canada:

- CBOFT-DT in Ottawa, Ontario
- CFTF-DT-8 in Les Escoumins, Quebec
- CICO-DT-59 in Chatham, Ontario
- CKVU-DT in Vancouver, British Columbia
