= Tiger Hotel =

- The Tiger Hotel
- U.S. National Register of Historic Places
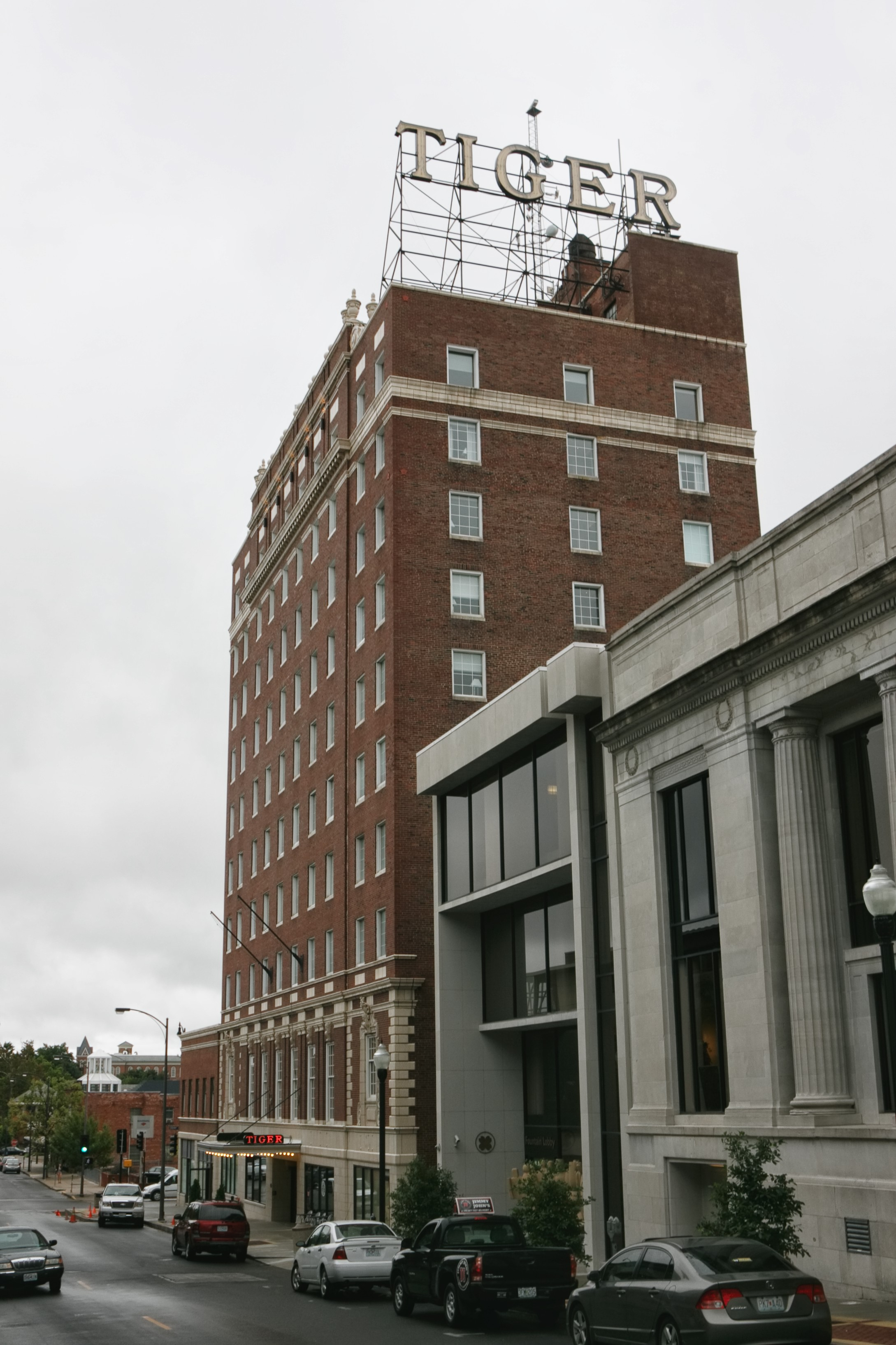

- Location within Missouri Location within the United States
- Location: 23 S. 8th St., Columbia, Missouri
- Coordinates: 38.950918°N 92.32885°W
- Area: less than one acre
- Built: 1928
- Architect: Gentry, Alonzo H.
- NRHP reference No.: 80002316
- Added to NRHP: February 29, 1980

The Tiger Hotel is a hotel in Columbia, Missouri. Built in 1928, it was converted to a retirement home and banquet center, before being restored and converted back to a boutique hotel in 2012. It was listed on the National Register of Historic Places in 1980. The hotel received a 4-diamond rating from AAA.

== History ==
Opened in 1928, the Tiger Hotel was designed by architect Alonzo H Gentry. and constructed by the Simon Construction Company. Upon opening, the 100-room hotel was the first skyscraper to be located between Kansas City and St. Louis. Due to the hotel's popularity, the "Tiger" sign on top of the building became an icon for both the city of Columbia and surrounding areas.

As the hotel's fortunes declined in the 1960s, it was renovated and renamed the Tiger Hotel to meet the needs of automobile travelers.

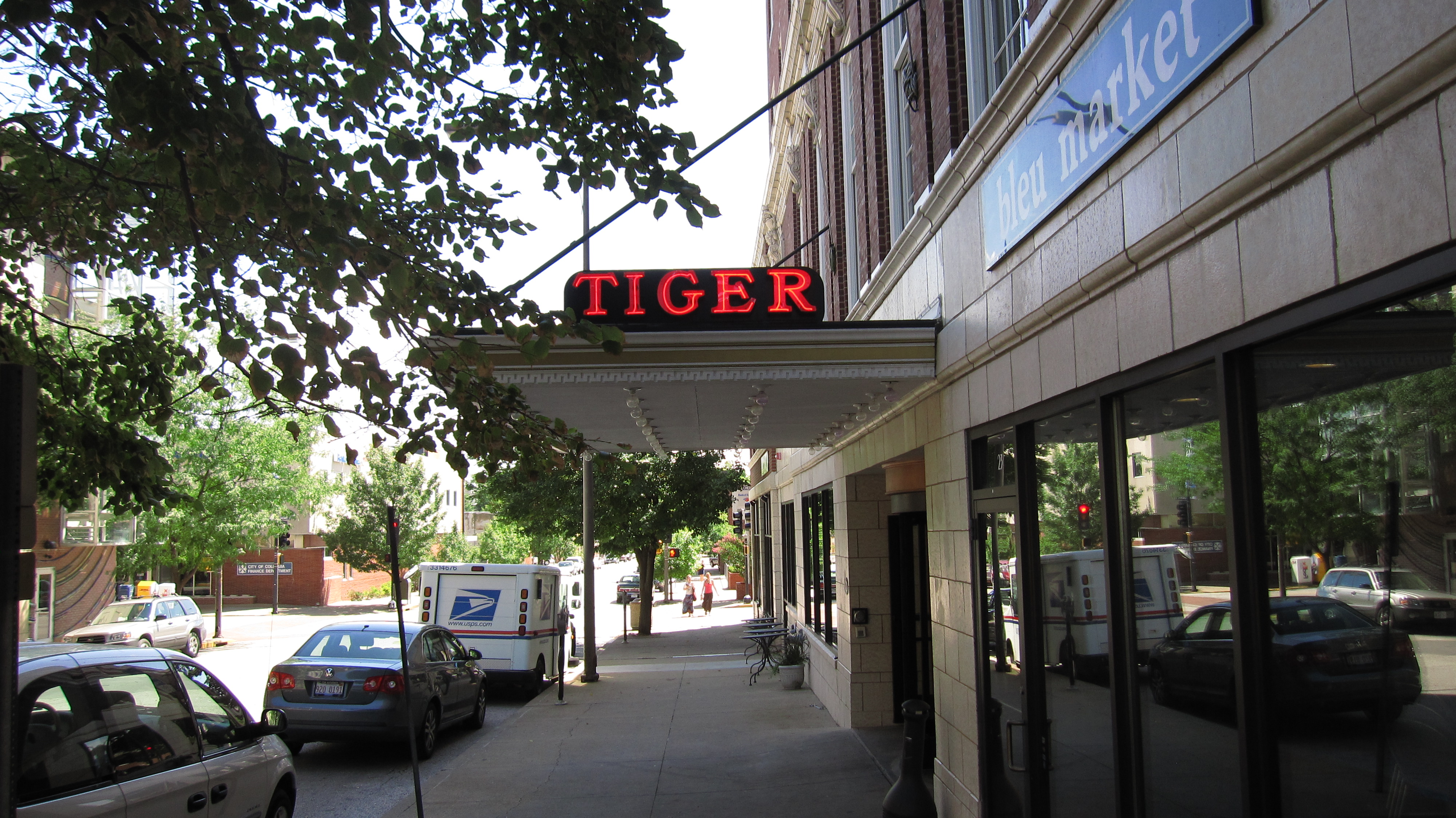
Tiger Hotel main entrance on 8th Street

In 1987, the Tiger Hotel was taken over by a federal bankruptcy court. It was converted into a retirement home, the Tiger-Kensington, and reopened in 1990. In 2003, it was purchased by Tiger Columns LLC, renamed Tiger Columns. with its ballrooms used as event space. In March 2011, the building was sold to Glyn Laverick, of Columbia Hotel Investments Inc. and it underwent a complete renovation. The restored Tiger Hotel welcomed its first guests when it was still only partially completed, for the True/False Film Festival in March 2012.

On February 1, 2022, the hotel joined the voco Hotels division of InterContinental Hotels Group and was renamed voco The Tiger Hotel.
