= Thousand Palms, California =

- census-designated place
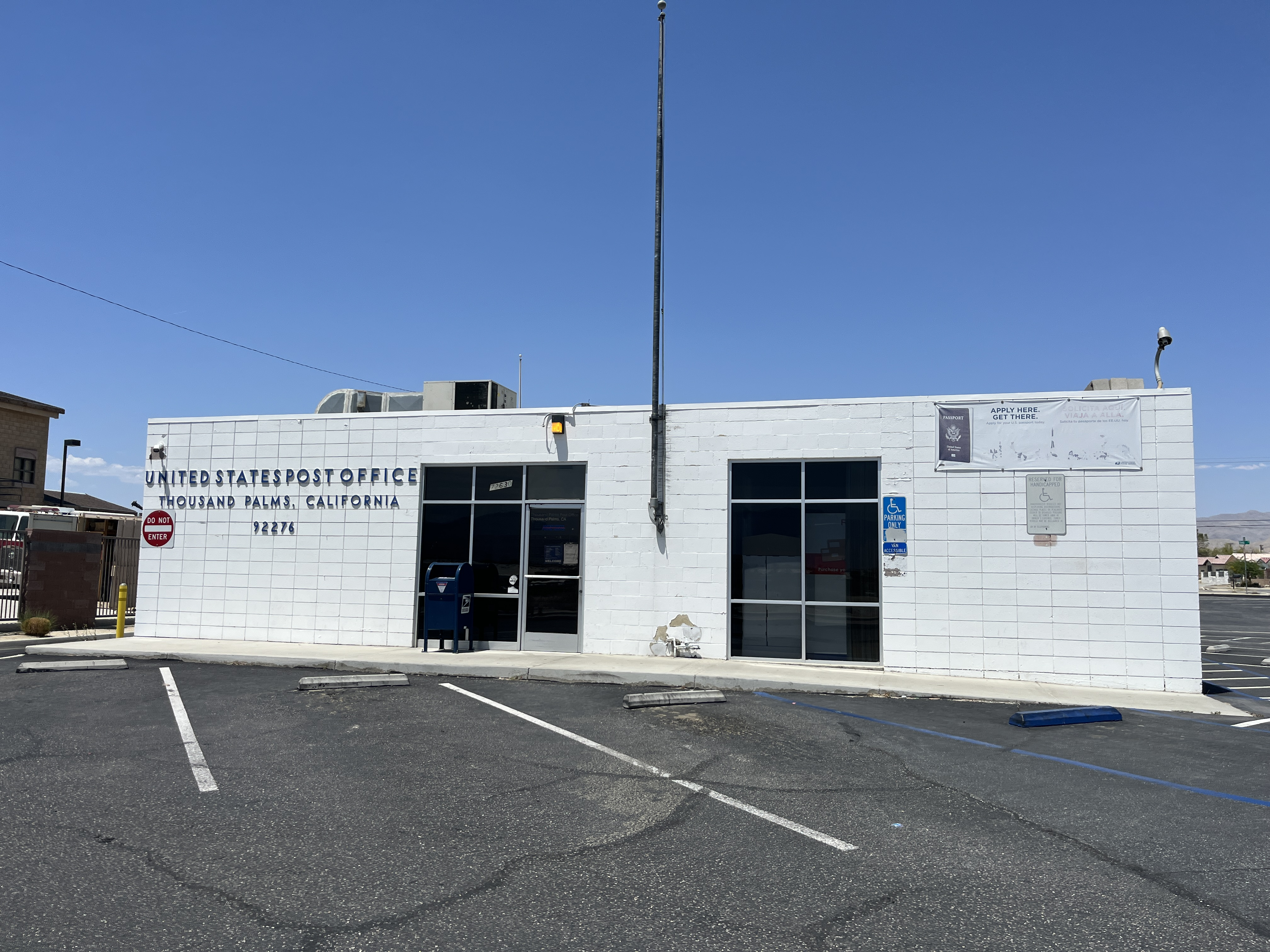
- Thousand Palms Post Office (2023)

- Location in Riverside County and the state of California

- Location in the United States
- Coordinates: 33°49′01″N 116°23′14″W
- Country: United States
- State: California
- County: Riverside

Area
  - Total: 23.641 sq mi (61.230 km^{2})
  - Land: 23.641 sq mi (61.230 km^{2})
  - Water: 0 sq mi (0 km^{2}) 0%
- Elevation: 246 ft (75 m)

Population (2020)
  - Total: 7,967
  - Density: 337.0/sq mi (130.1/km^{2})
- Time zone: UTC-8 (PST)
  - Summer (DST): UTC-7 (PDT)
- ZIP code: 92276
- Area codes: 442/760
- FIPS code: 06-78596
- GNIS feature IDs: 1656643, 2409313

Thousand Palms is a census-designated place (CDP) in the Coachella Valley of Riverside County, California, United States. The population was 7,967 at the 2020 census, up from 7,715 at the 2010 census.

== Geography ==
Thousand Palms is located at 33°49′01″N 116°23′14″W. It borders the cities of Rancho Mirage and Palm Desert. According to the United States Census Bureau, the CDP has a total area of 23.6 square miles (61 km^{2}), all of it land.

The Coachella Valley Preserve is a 20,000-acre large nature preserve consisting of several natural desert oases, aeolian sand dunes, and California fan palm tree groves. It is home to endangered wildlife such as the Coachella Valley fringe-toed lizard and other rare endemic species to the Sonoran Desert. The oases with their springs and ponds were created as the lines of the San Andreas Fault allow for underground water to rise to the surface. It is home to 183 bird species, and also an endangered fish species, the Desert pupfish. The preserve has over 25 miles of hiking trails and has been inhabited for centuries by Native Americans. The preserve was also a popular stagecoach stop between Los Angeles and the gold mines along the Colorado River.

== History ==
This area was previously known as 100 Palm Spring, as seen on 1874 maps and an official Land Office map dating to 1891. The post office was established in 1915, and the area was named Edom, California after the ancient Asian nation. However, in 1919, a residents petition was carried out and the name was changed to Thousand Palms.

The location had a post office called Edom in 1913. The post office was moved in 1938 and then renamed "Thousand Palms" in 1939.

== Sports ==
The Coachella Valley Firebirds of the American Hockey League, an affiliate of the Seattle Kraken of the National Hockey League, and the Coachella Valley Lakers of the NBA G League, an affiliate of the Los Angeles Lakers of the National Basketball Association, play their home games at Acrisure Arena located on Varner Road.

== Demographics ==
Historical population
Census	Pop.	Note	%±
1980	1,718		—
1990	4,122		139.9%
2000	5,120		24.2%
2010	7,715		50.7%
2020	7,967		3.3%
U.S. Decennial Census; 1860–1870 1880-1890; 1900 1910 1920; 1930 1940 1950; 1960 1970 1980; 1990 2000 2010

Thousand Palms first appeared as a census designated place in the 1980 U.S. census.

=== Racial and ethnic composition ===
Thousand Palms CDP, California – Racial and ethnic composition Note: the US Census treats Hispanic/Latino as an ethnic category. This table excludes Latinos from the racial categories and assigns them to a separate category. Hispanics/Latinos may be of any race.
Race / Ethnicity (NH = Non-Hispanic)	Pop 2000	Pop 2010	Pop 2020	% 2000	% 2010	% 2020
White alone (NH)	2,727	3,326	2,748	53.26%	43.11%	34.49%
Black or African American alone (NH)	35	81	89	0.68%	1.05%	1.12%
Native American or Alaska Native alone (NH)	21	35	26	0.41%	0.45%	0.33%
Asian alone (NH)	38	113	197	0.74%	1.46%	2.47%
Native Hawaiian or Pacific Islander alone (NH)	9	8	0	0.18%	0.10%	0.00%
Other race alone (NH)	3	15	21	0.06%	0.19%	0.26%
Mixed race or Multiracial (NH)	56	86	152	1.09%	1.11%	1.91%
Hispanic or Latino (any race)	2,231	4,051	4,734	43.57%	52.51%	59.42%
Total	5,120	7,715	7,967	100.00%	100.00%	100.00%

=== 2020 census ===
As of the 2020 census, Thousand Palms had a population of 7,967 and a population density of 337.0 inhabitants per square mile (130.1/km^{2}). The median age was 44.4 years. The age distribution was 20.7% under the age of 18, 8.6% aged 18 to 24, 21.3% aged 25 to 44, 25.2% aged 45 to 64, and 24.2% aged 65 or older. For every 100 females, there were 101.7 males, and for every 100 females age 18 and over, there were 99.1 males age 18 and over.

Racial composition as of the 2020 census
Race	Number	Percent
White	3,517	44.1%
Black or African American	109	1.4%
American Indian and Alaska Native	130	1.6%
Asian	213	2.7%
Native Hawaiian and Other Pacific Islander	5	0.1%
Some other race	2,708	34.0%
Two or more races	1,285	16.1%

The census reported that 98.4% of residents lived in households, 1.5% lived in non-institutionalized group quarters, and 0.1% were institutionalized. In addition, 91.4% of residents lived in urban areas, while 8.6% lived in rural areas.

There were 2,866 households, of which 26.6% had children under the age of 18 living in them. Of all households, 45.1% were married-couple households, 7.3% were cohabiting-couple households, 19.5% were households with a male householder and no spouse or partner present, and 28.1% were households with a female householder and no spouse or partner present. About 27.6% of households were made up of individuals, and 17.8% had someone living alone who was 65 years of age or older. The average household size was 2.73, and there were 1,873 families (65.4% of all households).

There were 3,728 housing units at an average density of 157.7 units per square mile (60.9 units/km^{2}). Of all housing units, 76.9% were occupied and 23.1% were vacant. Of occupied units, 74.2% were owner-occupied and 25.8% were occupied by renters. The homeowner vacancy rate was 3.6% and the rental vacancy rate was 3.8%.

=== Income and poverty ===
In 2023, the US Census Bureau estimated that the median household income was $80,280, and the per capita income was $31,465. About 9.2% of families and 10.4% of the population were below the poverty line.

=== 2010 census ===
At the 2010 census Thousand Palms had a population of 7,715. The population density was 326.4 inhabitants per square mile (126.0/km^{2}). The racial makeup of Thousand Palms was 5,763 (74.7%) White, 105 (1.4%) African American, 75 (1.0%) Native American, 129 (1.7%) Asian, 10 (0.1%) Pacific Islander, 1,422 (18.4%) from other races, and 211 (2.7%) from two or more races. Hispanic or Latino of any race were 4,051 persons (52.5%).

The census reported that 7,685 people (99.6% of the population) lived in households, 30 (0.4%) lived in non-institutionalized group quarters, and no one was institutionalized.

There were 2,849 households, 817 (28.7%) had children under the age of 18 living in them, 1,431 (50.2%) were opposite-sex married couples living together, 314 (11.0%) had a female householder with no husband present, 151 (5.3%) had a male householder with no wife present. There were 165 (5.8%) unmarried opposite-sex partnerships, and 45 (1.6%) same-sex married couples or partnerships. 727 households (25.5%) were one person and 465 (16.3%) had someone living alone who was 65 or older. The average household size was 2.70. There were 1,896 families (66.5% of households); the average family size was 3.26.

The age distribution was 1,754 people (22.7%) under the age of 18, 636 people (8.2%) aged 18 to 24, 1,629 people (21.1%) aged 25 to 44, 1,771 people (23.0%) aged 45 to 64, and 1,925 people (25.0%) who were 65 or older. The median age was 43.3 years. For every 100 females, there were 100.2 males. For every 100 females age 18 and over, there were 96.5 males.

There were 3,705 housing units at an average density of 156.8 per square mile, of the occupied units 2,227 (78.2%) were owner-occupied and 622 (21.8%) were rented. The homeowner vacancy rate was 4.4%; the rental vacancy rate was 11.9%. 5,591 people (72.5% of the population) lived in owner-occupied housing units and 2,094 people (27.1%) lived in rental housing units.

== Government ==
In the Riverside County Board of Supervisors, Thousand Palms is in 4th District, Represented by Democrat V. Manuel Perez Supervisor of the 4th District

In the California State Legislature, Thousand Palms is in the 19th senatorial district, represented by Republican Rosilicie Ochoa Bogh, and in the 47th Assembly district, represented by Republican Greg Wallis.

In the United States House of Representatives, Thousand Palms is in California's 25th congressional district, represented by Democrat Raul Ruiz.

== Utilities ==
Electricity in Thousand Palms is served by the Imperial Irrigation District.
