= Leadership opinion polling for the 2026 Israeli legislative election =

Opinion polls for upcoming elections

In the run up to the 2026 Israeli legislative election, scheduled to be held by 27 October 2026, various organisations are conducting opinion polling to gauge voter preferences for prime minister and other political figures in Israel during the term of the twenty-fifth Knesset. This article lists the results of such polls.

== General preference ==
=== Open question ===
The following polls asked prime ministerial preferences as an open question without providing a list of options.

Date	Polling firm	Publisher	Netanyahu	Gantz	Lapid	Bennett	Ben-Gvir	Cohen	Eisenkot	Golan	Lieberman	Other	None	Undecided
7 Oct	SF+ND	Channel 14	52	–	–	10	–	–	34	–	4	–	–	–
1 Oct	SF+ND	Channel 14	53	–	–	11	–	–	32	–	4	–	–	–
28 Sep 26	SF+ND	Channel 14	53	–	–	10	–	–	32	–	5	–	–	–
23 Sep 26	SF+ND	Channel 14	53	–	–	11	–	–	34	–	3	–	–	–
17 Sep 26	SF+ND	Channel 14	55	–	–	11	–	–	29	–	5	–	–	–
9 Sep 26	SF+ND	Channel 14	51	–	–	11	–	–	34	–	4	–	–	–
7 Sep 26	SF+ND	Channel 14	52	–	–	14	–	–	28	–	6	–	–	–
3 Sep 26	SF+ND	Channel 14	50	–	–	16	–	–	32	–	2	–	–	–
30 Aug 26	SF+ND	Channel 14	51	–	–	10	–	–	35	–	4	–	–	–
27 Aug 26	SF+ND	Channel 14	53	–	–	8	–	–	33	–	6	–	–	–
24 Aug 26	SF+ND	Channel 14	52	–	–	7	–	–	36	–	5	–	–	–
18 Aug 26	SF+ND	Channel 14	55	1	–	6	–	–	35	–	3	–	–	–
9 Aug 26	SF+ND	Channel 14	54	1	–	6	–	–	34	–	5	–	–	–
4 Aug 26	SF+ND	Channel 14	54	1	–	8	–	–	34	–	3	–	–	–
29 Jul 26	SF+ND	Channel 14	51	1	–	5	–	–	37	–	6	–	–	–
26 Jul 26	SF+ND	Channel 14	52	1	–	4	–	–	37	–	6	–	–	–
16 Jul 26	SF+ND	Channel 14	57	1	–	6	–	–	32	–	4	–	–	–
2 Jul 26	SF+ND	Channel 14	53	1	–	10	–	–	31	–	5	–	–	–
7 May 26	SF+ND	Channel 14	56	1	–	18	–	–	20	–	5	–	–	–
14 Jan 24	SF+DP	Channel 14	34	28	9	11	–	5	–	–	–	–	13	–
25–28 Dec 2023	Viterbi Center	Israel Democracy Institute	15	23	6.2	6.5	1.5	1.0	0.5	0.5	–	15.1 (Note: Nir Barkat with 0.7%;; Yoav Gallant with 0.4%; "another person from the right", "someone new/not a serving politician", and "anybody but Benjamin Netanyahu" each with 4%; "another person from the center-left" with 2%)	30.5	
14 May 23	SF+DP	Channel 14	43	35	17	–	–	–	–	–	–	5	–	
30 Apr 23	SF+DP	Channel 14	42	38	14	–	–	–	–	–	–	–	6	–
16 Apr 23	SF+DP	Channel 14	43	37	17	–	–	–	–	–	–	–	3	–
2 Apr 23	SF+DP	Channel 14	47	31	15	–	–	–	–	–	–	–	7	–
28 Mar 23	SF+DP	Channel 14	44	32	17	–	–	–	–	–	–	–	–	7
5 Mar 23	SF+DP	Channel 14	48	22	24	–	–	–	–	–	–	–	–	6

=== Within opposition bloc ===
Dates conducted	Polling firm	Publisher	Sample size	Bennett Bennett 2026	Eisenkot Yashar	Golan Democrats	Lieberman Yisrael Beiteinu	Lapid Yesh Atid	Gantz Blue & White	None of Them	Lead
30 Jul 2026	Midgam R&C	HaHadashot 12	505	33	50	–	12	–	–	5	17
29–30 Jul 2026	LRI+P4A	Maariv	501	25	45	10	11	–	–	9	20
11 Jun 2026	Midgam R&C	HaHadashot 12	501	36	46	11				7	10
4 Jun 2026	Midgam R&C	HaHadashot 12	505	39	46	8				7	7
14 May 2026	Midgam R&C	HaHadashot 12	506	45	42	13					3
29 Mar 2026	Kantar	Kan 11	553	18	24	4	6	7	4	37	6
26 Mar 2026	Yossi Tatika	Zman Israel	500	31	40	13	11	4	–	2	9
13 Jun 24	LRI+P4A	Maariv	501	–	–	–	28	–	68	4	40

=== Young voters ===
Dates conducted	Polling firm	Publisher	Margin of error	Sample size	Netanyahu	Ben-Gvir	Lapid	Gantz	Lieberman	Golan	Bennett	Eisenkot	None of Them	Don't Know	Lead
2 Apr 26	LRI+P4A	Ma'ariv	± 5 pp	400	35	6	3	1	7	4	19	7	9	9	16

== Specific pairs ==
=== Netanyahu vs. Eisenkot ===
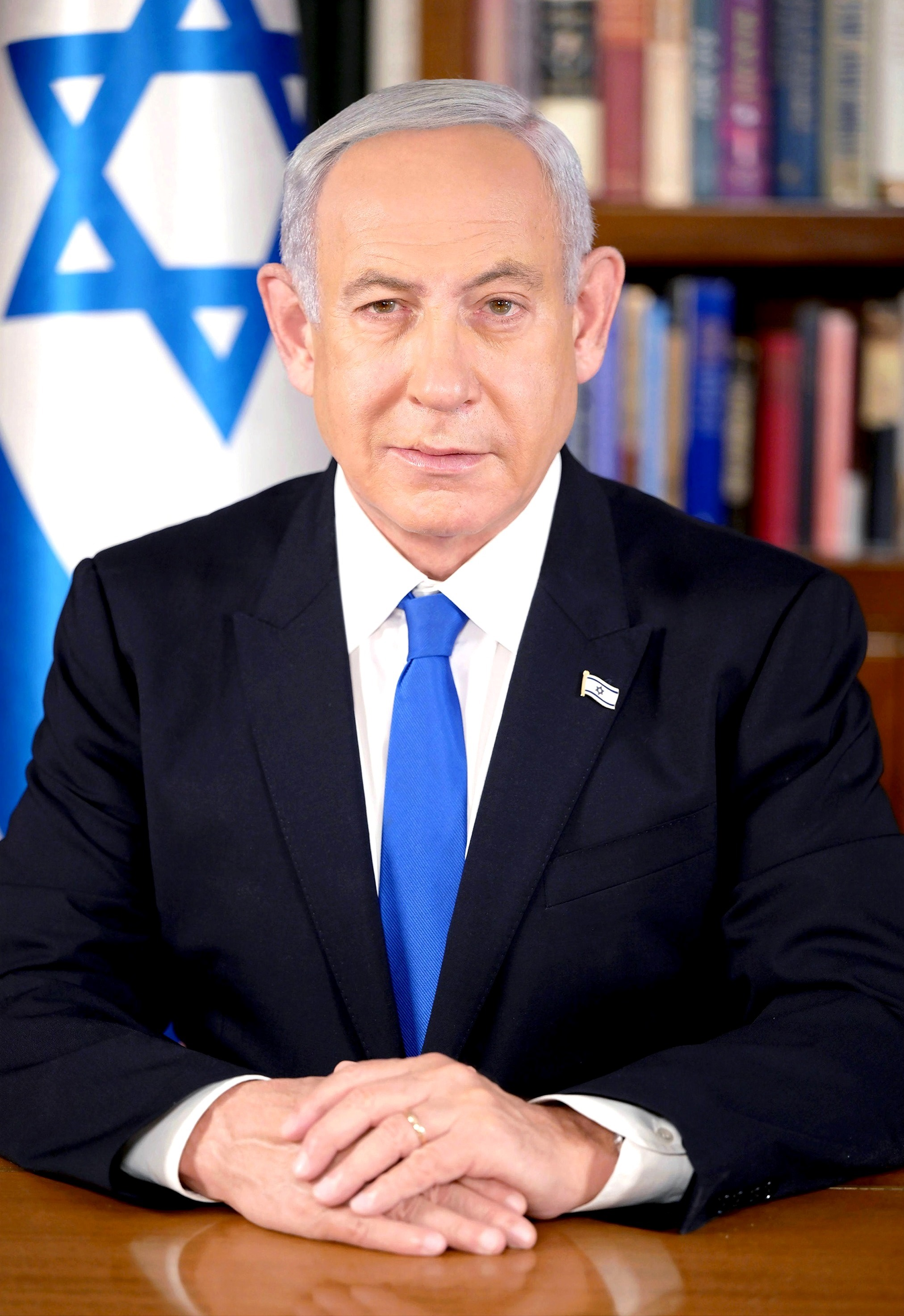
Benjamin Netanyahu
· Prime Minister
· Leader of the Likud party

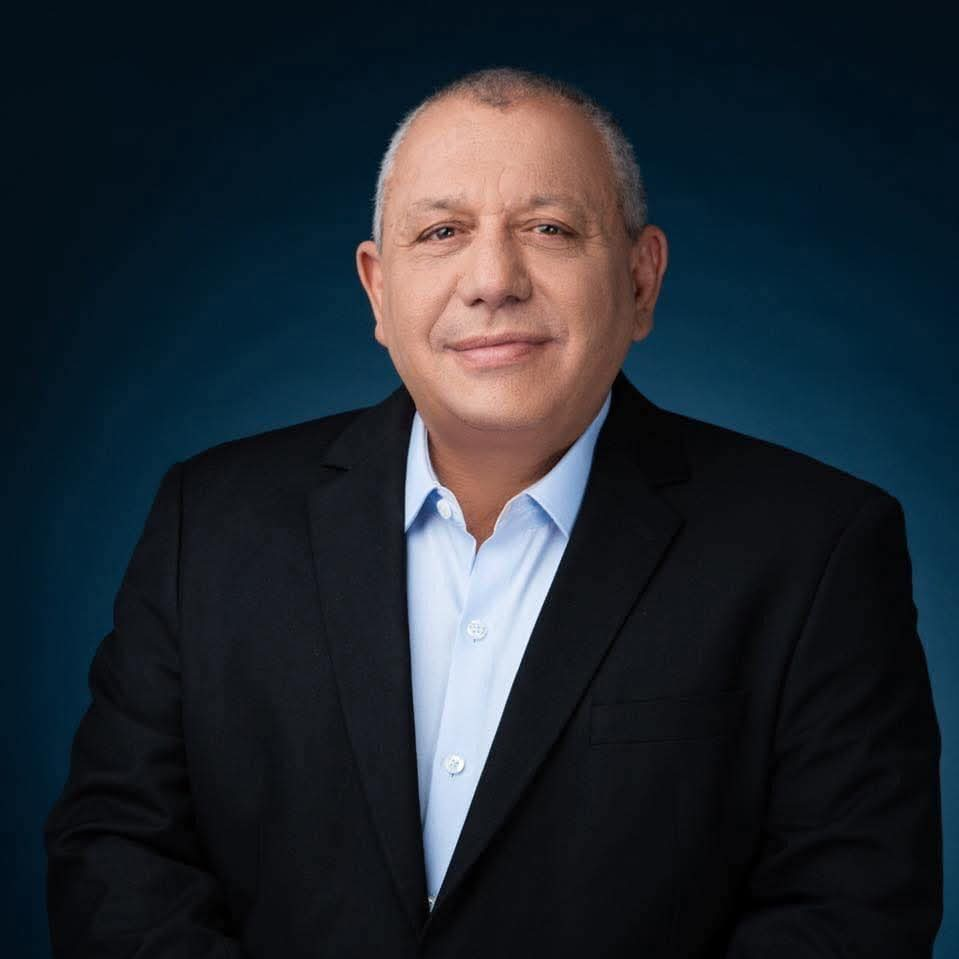
Gadi Eisenkot
· Leader of Yashar
· Former Chief of General Staff

Date	Polling firm	Publisher	Netanyahu	Eisenkot	Neither	Undecided
7 Oct	SF+ND	Channel 14	52	48	–	
5 Oct	Midgam R&C	HaHadashot 12	38	41	13	8
4 Oct	Kantar	Kan 11	41	38	21	
1 Oct	SF+ND	Channel 14	54	46	–	
30 Sep – 1 Oct	LRI+P4A	Maariv	41	47	12	
29 Sep	Maagar Mochot	Channel 16	41	46	13	
28 Sep 26	SF+ND	Channel 14	54	46	–	
27 Sep 26	Kantar	Kan 11	39	38	26	
23 Sep 26	SF+ND	Channel 14	53	47	–	
17 Sep 26	SF+ND	Channel 14	57	43	–	
14 Sep 26	Kantar	Kan 11	36	39	25	
9–10 Sep 26	LRI+P4A	Maariv	38	50	–	12
9 Sep 26	SF+ND	Channel 14	53	47	–	
9 Sep	Maagar Mochot	Channel 16	42	43	15	–
9 Sep 26	Midgam R&C	HaHadashot 12	38	42	13	7
9 Sep 26	MP+TM+SN+A	Channel 13	35	46	–	19
7 Sep 26	SF+ND	Channel 14	56	44	–	
7 Sep 26	Midgam R&C	HaHadashot 12	35	42	17	6
6 Sep 26	Kantar	Kan 11	35	38	29	
3–4 Sep 26	LRI+P4A	Maariv	39	48	–	13
3 Sep 26	SF+ND	Channel 14	54	46	–	
2 Sep 26	MP+TM+SN+A	Channel 13	37	47	–	16
2 Sep 26	Maagar Mochot	Channel 16	40	45	15	–
31 Aug 26	Midgam R&C	HaHadashot 12	34	43	17	6
30 Aug 26	SF+ND	Channel 14	54	46	–	
30 Aug 26	Kantar	Kan 11	37	40	23	
27 Aug 26	SF+ND	Channel 14	56	44	–	
26–27 Aug 26	LRI+P4A	Maariv	37	48	–	15
26 Aug 26	Maagar Mochot	Channel 16	41	44	15	–
24 Aug 26	SF+ND	Channel 14	56	44	–	
24 Aug 26	Midgam R&C	HaHadashot 12	34	44	16	6
23 Aug 26	Kantar	Kan 11	35	41	24	
19–20 Aug 26	LRI+P4A	Maariv	38	52	–	10
19 Aug 26	MP+TM+SN+A	Channel 13	38	47	–	15
19 Aug 26	Maagar Mochot	Channel 16	40	44	16	–
18 Aug 26	SF+ND	Channel 14	55	45	–	
17 Aug 26	Midgam R&C	HaHadashot 12	34	38	22	6
16 Aug 26	Kantar	Kan 11	36	41	23	
12–13 Aug 26	LRI+P4A	Maariv	38	49	–	13
12 Aug 26	MP+TM+SN+A	Channel 13	34	47	–	19
10 Aug 26	Maagar Mochot	Channel 16	40	43	17	–
10 Aug 26	Midgam R&C	HaHadashot 12	35	40	19	7
9 Aug 26	Kantar	Kan 11	41	34	25	
9 Aug 26	SF+ND	Channel 14	55	45	–	
5–6 Aug 26	LRI+P4A	Maariv	38	47	–	15
5 Aug 26	MP+TM+SN+A	Channel 13	36	46	18	
4 Aug 26	SF+ND	Channel 14	56	44	–	
3 Aug 26	Midgam R&C	HaHadashot 12	37	37	21	5
2 Aug 26	Kantar	Kan 11	40	36	24	
29–30 Jul 26	LRI+P4A	Maariv	38	48	–	13
29 Jul 26	MP+TM+SN+A	Channel 13	36	47	17	
27 Jul 26	Midgam R&C	HaHadashot 12	38	38	24	
27 Jul 26	Direct Polls	i24 News	45	44	11	
26 Jul 26	Kantar	Kan 11	39	38	23	
22–23 Jul 26	LRI+P4A	Maariv	40	46	–	14
19 Jul 26	Kantar	Kan 11	36	35	29	
16 Jul 26	Direct Polls	i24 News	44	47	–	9
13 Jul 26	Midgam R&C	HaHadashot 12	34	43	27	
5 Jul 26	Kantar	Kan 11	40	41	19	
11 Jun 26	Midgam R&C	HaHadashot 12	36	36	28	
4 Jun 26	Midgam R&C	HaHadashot 12	35	38	27	
14 May 26	Midgam R&C	HaHadashot 12	39	35	26	
2 May 26	LRI+P4A	Maariv	42	44	–	14
17 Apr 26	LRI+P4A	Maariv	45	38	–	17
19 Mar 26	Midgam R&C	HaHadashot 12	43	31	–	–
17 Feb 25	Midgam R&C	HaHadashot 12	36	31	–	–
30 Jan 24	Midgam R&C	HaHadashot 12	24	36	31	9
21 Jan 24	CF+MP+SN	Channel 13	32	45	–	23

=== Netanyahu vs. Bennett ===
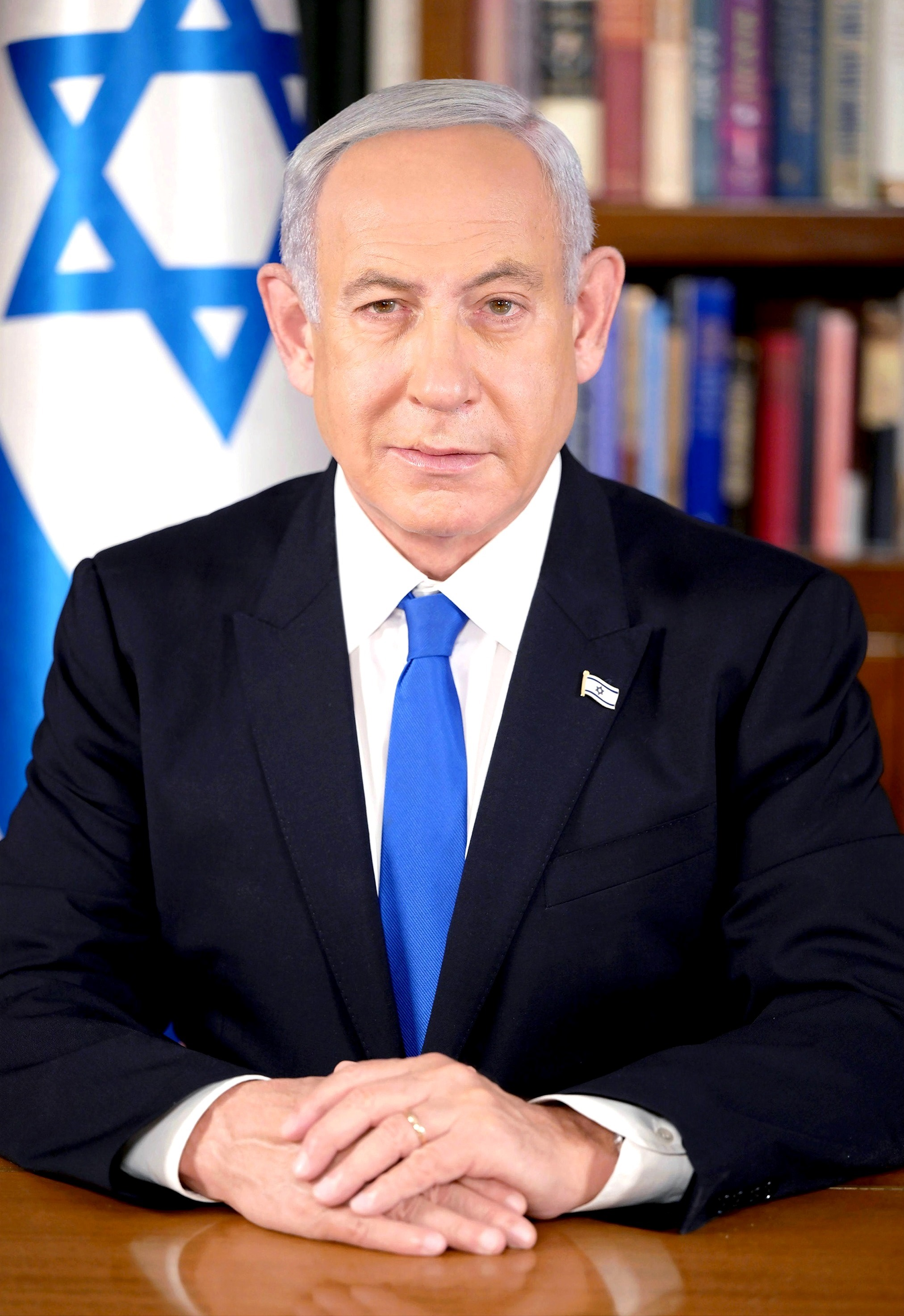
Benjamin Netanyahu
· Prime Minister
· Leader of the Likud party

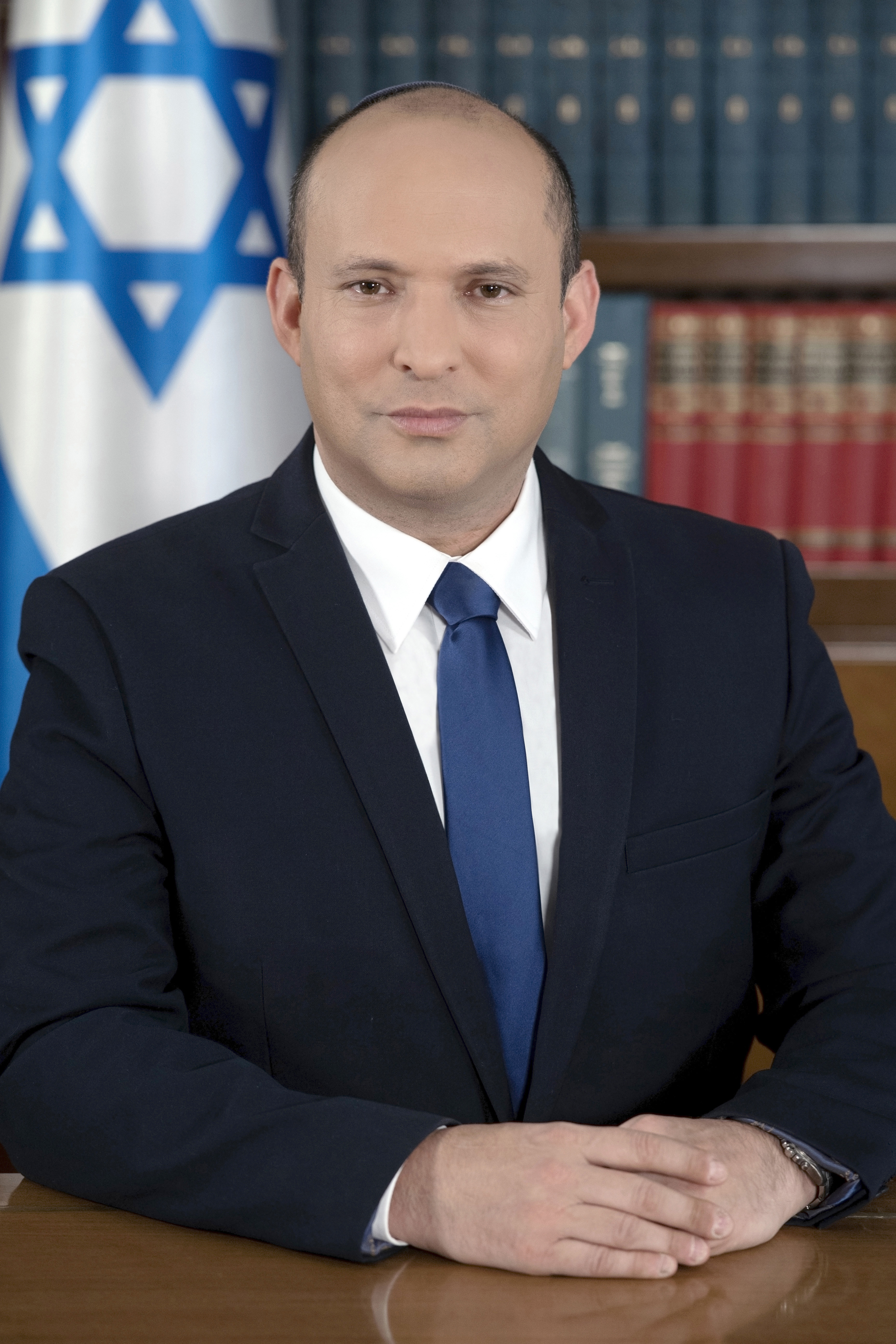
Naftali Bennett
· Former Prime minister
. Leader of the Bennett 2026 party

Date	Polling firm	Publisher	Netanyahu	Bennett	Neither	Undecided
5 Oct	Midgam R&C	HaHadashot 12	41	37	16	6
4 Oct	Kantar	Kan 11	40	35	25	
27 Sep 26	Kantar	Kan 11	42	33	25	
14 Sep 26	Kantar	Kan 11	37	32	31	
9–10 Sep 26	LRI+P4A	Maariv	40	45	–	15
9 Sep 26	Midgam R&C	HaHadashot 12	40	37	19	4
7 Sep 26	Midgam R&C	HaHadashot 12	38	35	23	6
6 Sep 26	Kantar	Kan 11	37	32	31	
3–4 Sep 26	LRI+P4A	Maariv	39	43	–	15
31 Aug 26	Midgam R&C	HaHadashot 12	36	35	23	6
30 Aug 26	Kantar	Kan 11	37	36	27	
26–27 Aug 26	LRI+P4A	Maariv	40	45	–	15
24 Aug 26	Midgam R&C	HaHadashot 12	37	39	19	5
23 Aug 26	Kantar	Kan 11	36	37	27	
19–20 Aug 26	LRI+P4A	Maariv	41	45	–	14
19 Aug 26	MP+TM+SN+A	Channel 13	42	43	–	15
17 Aug 26	Midgam R&C	HaHadashot 12	35	34	27	4
16 Aug 26	Kantar	Kan 11	37	35	28	
10 Aug 26	Midgam R&C	HaHadashot 12	35	37	22	5
9 Aug 26	Kantar	Kan 11	41	31	28	
5–6 Aug 26	LRI+P4A	Maariv	40	43	–	17
3 Aug 26	Midgam R&C	HaHadashot 12	38	37	21	4
2 Aug 26	Kantar	Kan 11	40	31	29	
29–30 Jul 26	LRI+P4A	Maariv	39	44	–	17
29 Jul 26	MP+TM+SN+A	Channel 13	40	45	15	
27 Jul 26	Midgam R&C	HaHadashot 12	40	34	26	
27 Jul 26	Direct Polls	i24 News	47	37	16	
26 Jul 26	Kantar	Kan 11	39	31	30	
22–23 Jul26	LRI+P4A	Maariv	42	45	–	13
19 Jul 26	Kantar	Kan 11	36	32	35	
13 Jul 26	Midgam R&C	HaHadashot 12	37	35	28	
5 Jul 26	Kantar	Kan 11	41	33	26	
11 Jun 26	Midgam R&C	HaHadashot 12	37	33	29	
4 Jun 26	Midgam R&C	HaHadashot 12	38	31	31	
14 May 26	Midgam R&C	HaHadashot 12	40	33	27	
2 May 26	LRI+P4A	Maariv	41	46	–	13
17 Apr 26	LRI+P4A	Maariv	43	41	–	16
19 Mar 26	Midgam R&C	HaHadashot 12	44	28	24	4
4 Jun 25	Midgam R&C	HaHadashot 12	34	39	20	–
17 Feb 25	Midgam R&C	HaHadashot 12	37	37	–	–
28 Oct 24	Midgam R&C	HaHadashot 12	38	35	23	4
29 Sep 24	Midgam R&C	HaHadashot 12	35	38	20	7
9 Sep 24	Midgam R&C	HaHadashot 12	32	39	22	7
22 Aug 24	Midgam R&C	HaHadashot 12	31	39	25	5
10–11 Jul 24	LRI+P4A	Maariv	35	48	17	–
9 Jul 24	Timor Group	i24 News	28	41	31	–
28 Jun 24	LRI+P4A	Maariv	36	48	–	–
24 Jun 24	Midgam R&C	HaHadashot 12	29	39	27	5
21 Jun 24	Midgam R&C	HaHadashot 12	28	36	31	5
29 May 24	Midgam R&C	HaHadashot 12	34	32	29	5
11 Jan 24	Midgam R&C	HaHadashot 12	30	31	–	–
18 Dec 23	Midgam R&C	HaHadashot 12	29	33	32	6
7 Jul 23	Midgam R&C	HaHadashot 12	39	25	36	
30 Apr 23	CF+MP+SN	Channel 13	43	40	–	17

=== Netanyahu vs. Lieberman ===
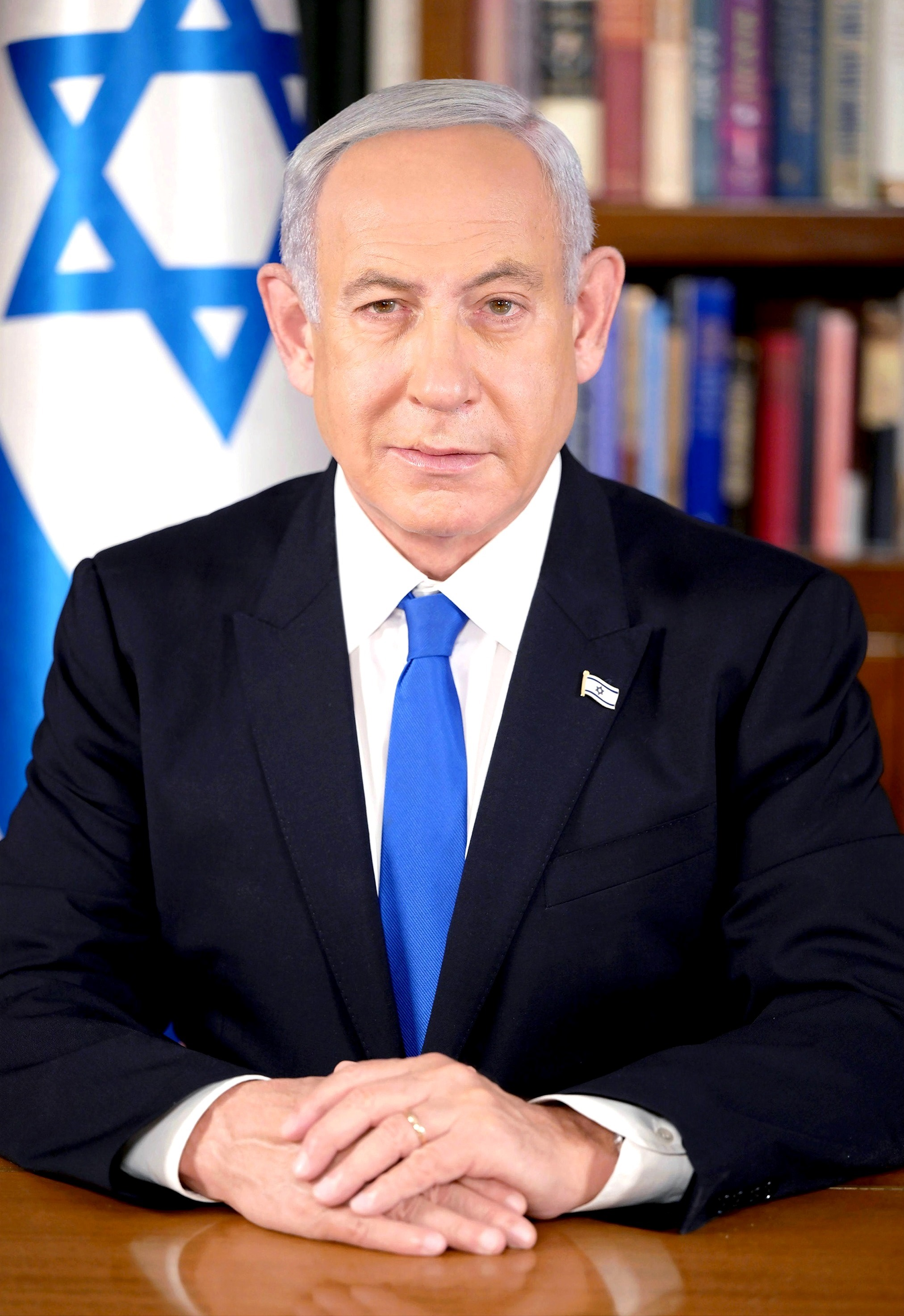
Benjamin Netanyahu
· Prime Minister
· Leader of the Likud party

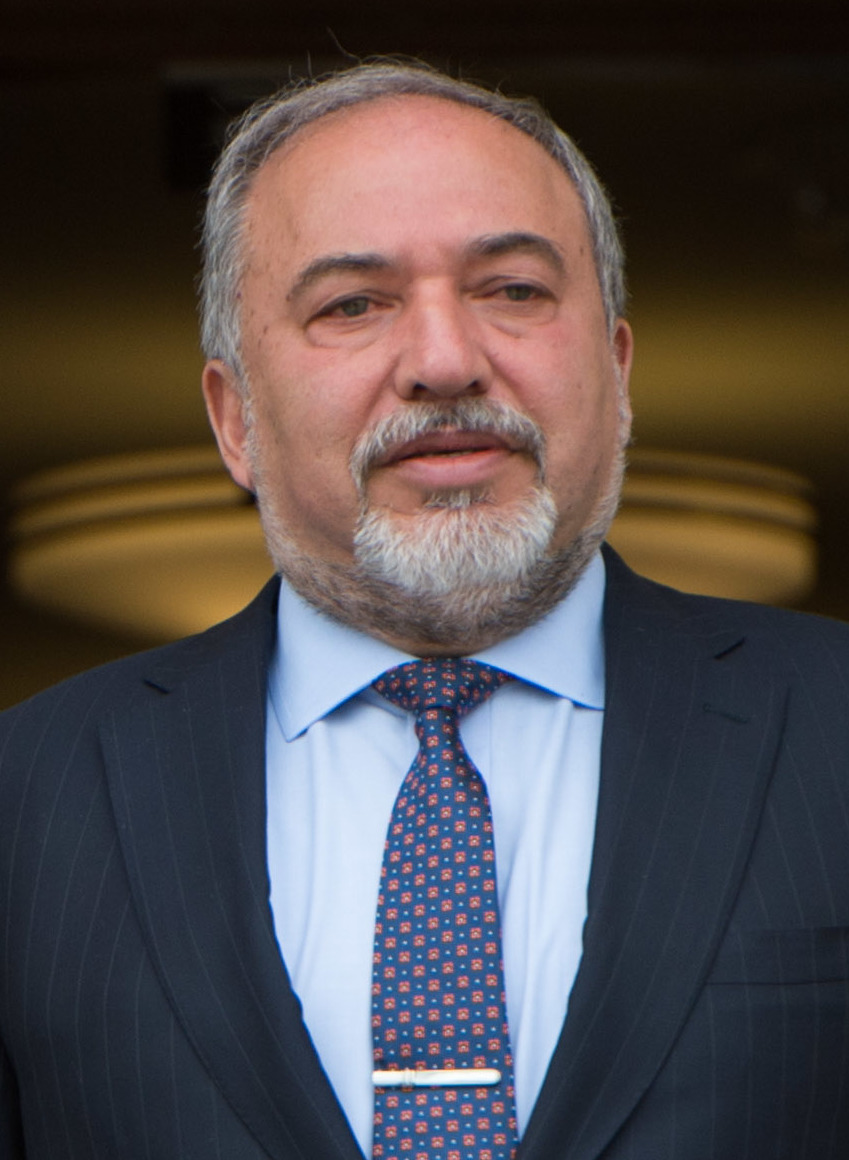
Avigdor Lieberman
· Former Minister of Defense
· Leader of the Yisrael Beiteinu party

Date	Polling firm	Publisher	Netanyahu	Lieberman	Neither	Undecided
5 Oct; 26	Midgam R&C	HaHadashot 12	43	26	26	5
9–10 Sep 26	LRI+P4A	Maariv	41	38	–	21
9 Sep 26	Midgam R&C	HaHadashot 12	40	27	28	5
7 Sep 26	Midgam R&C	HaHadashot 12	37	25	32	6
3–4 Sep 26	LRI+P4A	Maariv	42	39	–	19
31 Aug 26	Midgam R&C	HaHadashot 12	36	27	31	6
26–27 Aug 26	LRI+P4A	Maariv	37	40	–	23
24 Aug 26	Midgam R&C	HaHadashot 12	35	28	32	5
19–20 Aug 26	LRI+P4A	Maariv	42	39	–	19
17 Aug 26	Midgam R&C	HaHadashot 12	35	24	36	5
10 Aug 26	Midgam R&C	HaHadashot 12	38	24	34	4
5–6 Aug 26	LRI+P4A	Maariv	42	38	–	20
3 Aug 26	Midgam R&C	HaHadashot 12	38	27	30	5
29–30 Jul 26	LRI+P4A	Maariv	43	39	–	18
27 Jul 26	Midgam R&C	HaHadashot 12	39	25	46	
11 Jun 26	Midgam R&C	HaHadashot 12	38	25	37	
4 Jun 26	Midgam R&C	HaHadashot 12	36	24	40	
14 May 26	Midgam R&C	HaHadashot 12	41	22	37	
17 Apr 26	LRI+P4A	Maariv	48	29	–	23
19 Mar 26	Midgam R&C	HaHadashot 12	45	17	–	–
9 Jul 24	Timor Group	i24 News	30	24	46	–
28 Jun 24	LRI+P4A	Maariv	39	34	–	27
13 Jun 24	LRI+P4A	Maariv	37	35	–	28
29 May 24	Midgam R&C	HaHadashot 12	36	19	41	4

=== Netanyahu vs. Gantz ===
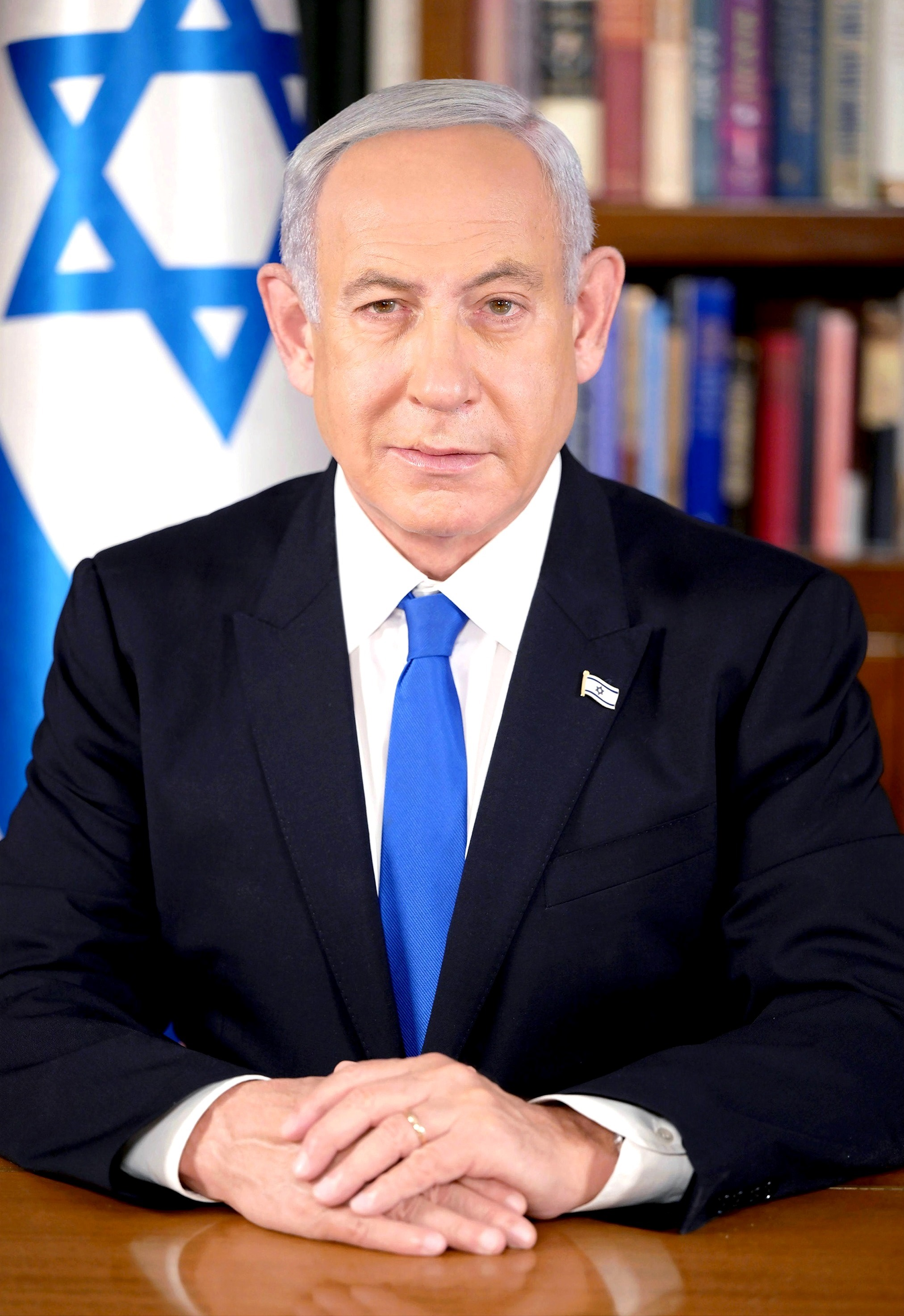
Benjamin Netanyahu
· Prime Minister
· Leader of the Likud party

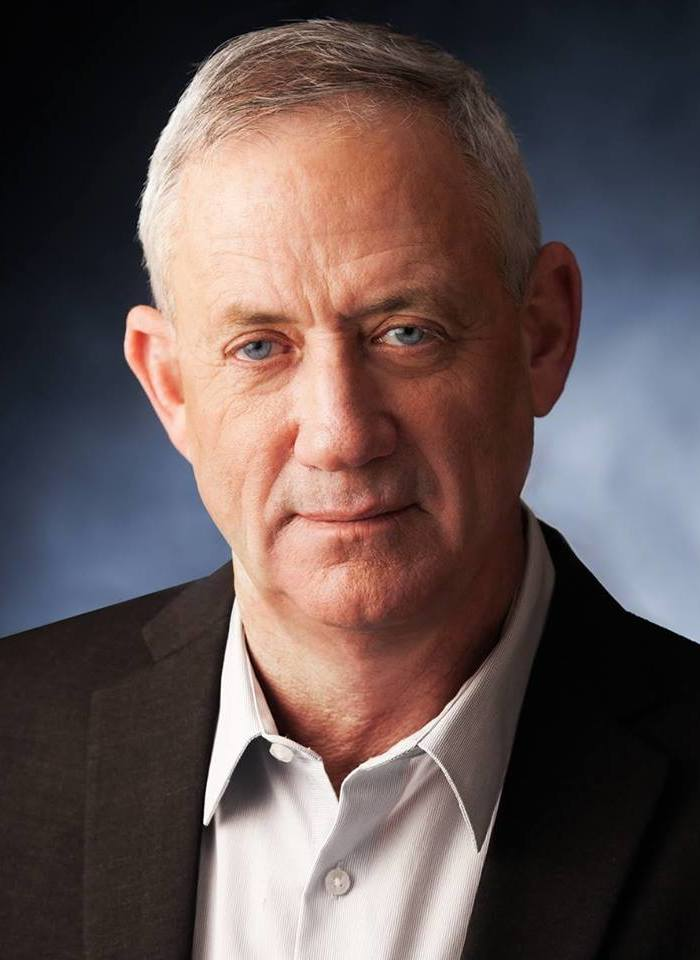
Benny Gantz
· Leader of the National Unity alliance
· Former Alternate Prime minister
· Former Speaker of the Knesset

Date	Polling firm	Publisher	Netanyahu	Gantz	Neither	Undecided
4 Jun 25	Midgam R&C	HaHadashot 12	37	23	–	–
17 Mar 25	SF+DP	Channel 14	47	17	36	–
17 Feb 25	Midgam R&C	HaHadashot 12	37	27	–	–
12 Dec 24	SF+DP	Channel 14	52	21	27	–
28 Nov 24	SF+DP	Channel 14	45	26	29	–
19 Nov 24	SF+DP	Channel 14	49	21	30	–
6 Nov 24	SF+DP	Channel 14	47	27	26	–
28 Oct 24	Midgam R&C	HaHadashot 12	39	27	29	5
27 Oct 24	SF+DP	Channel 14	50	23	27	–
29 Sep 24	SF+DP	Channel 14	52	25	23	–
29 Sep 24	Midgam R&C	HaHadashot 12	38	29	31	5
26 Sep 24	SF+DP	Channel 14	45	26	29	–
19 Sep 24	SF+DP	Channel 14	48	27	25	–
9 Sep 24	Midgam R&C	HaHadashot 12	34	28	31	7
22 Aug 24	Midgam R&C	HaHadashot 12	32	30	33	5
15 Aug 24	SF+DP	Channel 14	45	32	23	–
8 Aug 24	SF+DP	Channel 14	48	29	23	–
31 Jul	LRI+P4A	Maariv	39	41	–	19
10–11 Jul	LRI+P4A	Maariv	38	43	–	19
9 Jul	Timor Group	i24 News	27	31	42	–
28 Jun 24	LRI+P4A	Maariv	38	44	–	18
25 Jun 24	SF+DP	Channel 14	44	33	23	–
24 Jun 24	Midgam R&C	HaHadashot 12	31	34	29	6
21 Jun 24	Midgam R&C	HaHadashot 12	32	32	33	3
20 Jun 24	SF+DP	Channel 14	39	36	25	–
19 Jun 24	LRI+P4A	Maariv	35	42	–	23
13 Jun 24	LRI+P4A	Maariv	35	41	–	24
10 Jun 24	Midgam R&C	HaHadashot 12	31	32	32	5
10 Jun 24	SF+DP	Channel 14	47	31	22	–
10 Jun 24	MM+SN	Channel 13	36	45	–	19
10 Jun 24	Kantar	Kan 11	30	38	–	–
5–6 Jun 24	LRI+P4A	Maariv	34	42	–	24
2 Jun 24	Kantar	Kan 11	30	38	32	–
30 May 24	SF+DP	Channel 14	44	33	23	–
29–30 May 24	LRI+P4A	Maariv	37	41	–	22
29 May 24	Midgam R&C	HaHadashot 12	36	30	30	4
16 May 24	SF+DP	Channel 14	43	34	23	–
15–16 May 24	LRI+P4A	Maariv	35	45	–	20
10 May 24	LRI+P4A	Maariv	34	47	–	19
9 May 24	SF+DP	Channel 14	46	33	21	–
1–2 May 24	LRI+P4A	Maariv	33	47	–	20
30 Apr 24	Midgam R&C	HaHadashot 12	30	36	34	–
26 Apr 24	LRI+P4A	Maariv	36	45	–	19
17–18 Apr 24	LRI+P4A	Maariv	37	42	–	21
14 Apr 24	SF+DP	Channel 14	42	36	22	–
10–11 Apr 24	LRI+P4A	Maariv	35	47	–	22
7 Apr 24	SF+DP	Channel 14	41	32	27	–
31 Mar 24	SF+DP	Channel 14	43	39	18	–
27–28 Mar 24	LRI+P4A	Maariv	38	45	–	17
20–21 Mar 24	LRI+P4A	Maariv	34	44	–	22
13–14 Mar 24	LRI+P4A	Maariv	34	47	–	19
13 Mar 24	SF+DP	Channel 14	47	37	16	–
12 Mar 24	Midgam R&C	HaHadashot 12	29	41	23	7
6–7 Mar 24	LRI+P4A	Maariv	34	48	–	17
28–29 Feb 24	LRI+P4A	Maariv	33	50	–	–
21–22 Feb 24	LRI+P4A	Maariv	32	48	–	20
14–15 Feb 24	LRI+P4A	Maariv	32	47	–	21
11 Feb 24	Midgam R&C	HaHadashot 12	27	43	22	8
7–8 Feb 24	LRI+P4A	Maariv	32	48	–	20
31 Jan–1 Feb 24	LRI+P4A	Maariv	32	49	–	19
30 Jan 24	Midgam R&C	HaHadashot 12	23	41	29	7
24–25 Jan 24	LRI+P4A	Maariv	32	52	–	18
21 Jan 24	CF+MP+SN	Channel 13	30	48	–	22
17–18 Jan 24	LRI+P4A	Maariv	31	50	–	19
11 Jan 24	Midgam R&C	HaHadashot 12	29	42	–	–
10–11 Jan 24	LRI+P4A	Maariv	29	51	–	20
7 Jan 24	Kantar	Kan 11	25	46	–	–
6 Jan 24	SF+DP	Channel 14	40	40	20	–
3–4 Jan 24	LRI+P4A	Maariv	34	48	–	–
28 Dec 23	CF+MP+SN	Channel 13	31	52	–	17
27–28 Dec 23	LRI+P4A	Maariv	32	49	–	20
20–21 Dec 23	LRI+P4A	Maariv	34	46	–	20
18 Dec 23	Midgam R&C	HaHadashot 12	27	45	22	6
13–14 Dec 23	LRI+P4A	Maariv	31	51	–	18
6–7 Dec 23	LRI+P4A	Maariv	31	51	–	18
1 Dec 23	LRI+P4A	Maariv	30	49	–	21
22–23 Nov 23	LRI+P4A	Maariv	27	52	–	21
16 Nov 23	Midgam R&C	HaHadashot 12	25	41	25	9
15–16 Nov 23	LRI+P4A	Maariv	29	50	–	21
8–9 Nov 23	LRI+P4A	Maariv	26	52	–	22
1–2 Nov 23	LRI+P4A	Maariv	27	49	–	24
25–26 Oct 23	LRI+P4A	Maariv	28	49	–	23
18–19 Oct 23	LRI+P4A	Maariv	28	48	–	24
11–12 Oct 23	LRI+P4A	Maariv	29	48	–	23
27–28 Sep 23	LRI+P4A	Maariv	44	41	–	15
26 Sep 23	Midgam R&C	HaHadashot 12	37	35	22	6
26 Sep 23	Kantar	Kan 11	39	39	22	–
14 Sep 23	SF+DP	Channel 14	43	42	15	–
10 Sep 23	Midgam R&C	HaHadashot 12	36	39	21	4
6 Sep 23	SF+DP	Channel 14	44	44	12	–
31 Aug 23	SF+DP	Channel 14	41	48	11	–
25 Aug 23	Midgam R&C	HaHadashot 12	34	39	22	5
4 Aug 23	Midgam R&C	HaHadashot 12	37	39	21	3
25 Jul 23	Midgam R&C	HaHadashot 12	38	38	22	2
24 Jul 23	SF+DP	Channel 14	45	45	10	–
21 Jul 23	Midgam R&C	HaHadashot 12	36	34	23	7
13 Jul 23	Midgam R&C	HaHadashot 12	36	37	21	6
13 Jul 23	SF+DP	Channel 14	48	40	12	–
9 Jul 23	Kantar	Kan 11	35	43	–	22
7 Jul 23	Midgam R&C	HaHadashot 12	39	34	27	
29 Jun 23	SF+DP	Channel 14	49	43	8	–
25 Jun 23	Midgam R&C	HaHadashot 12	35	39	21	5
15 Jun 23	Panels Politics	Maariv	37	47	–	16
15 Jun 23	Midgam R&C	HaHadashot 12	36	37	24	3
15 Jun 23	SF+DP	Channel 14	38	47	15	–
9 Jun 23	Midgam R&C	HaHadashot 12	36	37	–	27
8 Jun 23	SF+DP	Channel 14	44	47	9	–
7–8 Jun 23	Panels Politics	Maariv	38	45	–	–
31 May–1 Jun 23	Panels Politics	Maariv	39	43	–	18
30 May 23	Midgam R&C	HaHadashot 12	34	36	24	6
18 May 23	Midgam R&C	HaHadashot 12	39	36	18	6
17–18 May 23	Panels Politics	Maariv	38	42	20	–
14 May 23	Kantar	Kan 11	40	41	19	–
14 May 23	SF+DP	Channel 14	44	46	10	–
14 May 23	Midgam R&C	HaHadashot 12	38	37	18	7
12 May 23	Panels Politics	Maariv	38	41	–	21
7 May 23	CF+MP+SN	Channel 13	37	45	–	18
7 May 23	Midgam R&C	HaHadashot 12	31	41	28	7
4–5 May 23	Panels Politics	Maariv	33	41	–	26
30 Apr 23	CF+MP+SN	Channel 13	34	49	–	17
30 Apr 23	Kantar	Kan 11	33	43	24	–
30 Apr 23	SF+DP	Channel 14	42	48	10	–
28 Apr 23	Midgam R&C	HaHadashot 12	35	37	22	6
16 Apr 23	Midgam R&C	HaHadashot 12	34	39	22	5
16 Apr 23	SF+DP	Channel 14	43	49	8	–
13 Apr 23	Panels Politics	Maariv	37	44	–	19
9 Apr 23	CF+MP+SN	Channel 13	34	51	–	15
2 Apr 23	SF+DP	Channel 14	48	44	8	–
31 Mar 23	Midgam R&C	HaHadashot 12	31	38	25	6
27 Mar 23	Kantar	Kan 11	30	37	33	–
3 Mar 23	Midgam R&C	HaHadashot 12	37	26	32	5

=== Netanyahu vs. Lapid ===
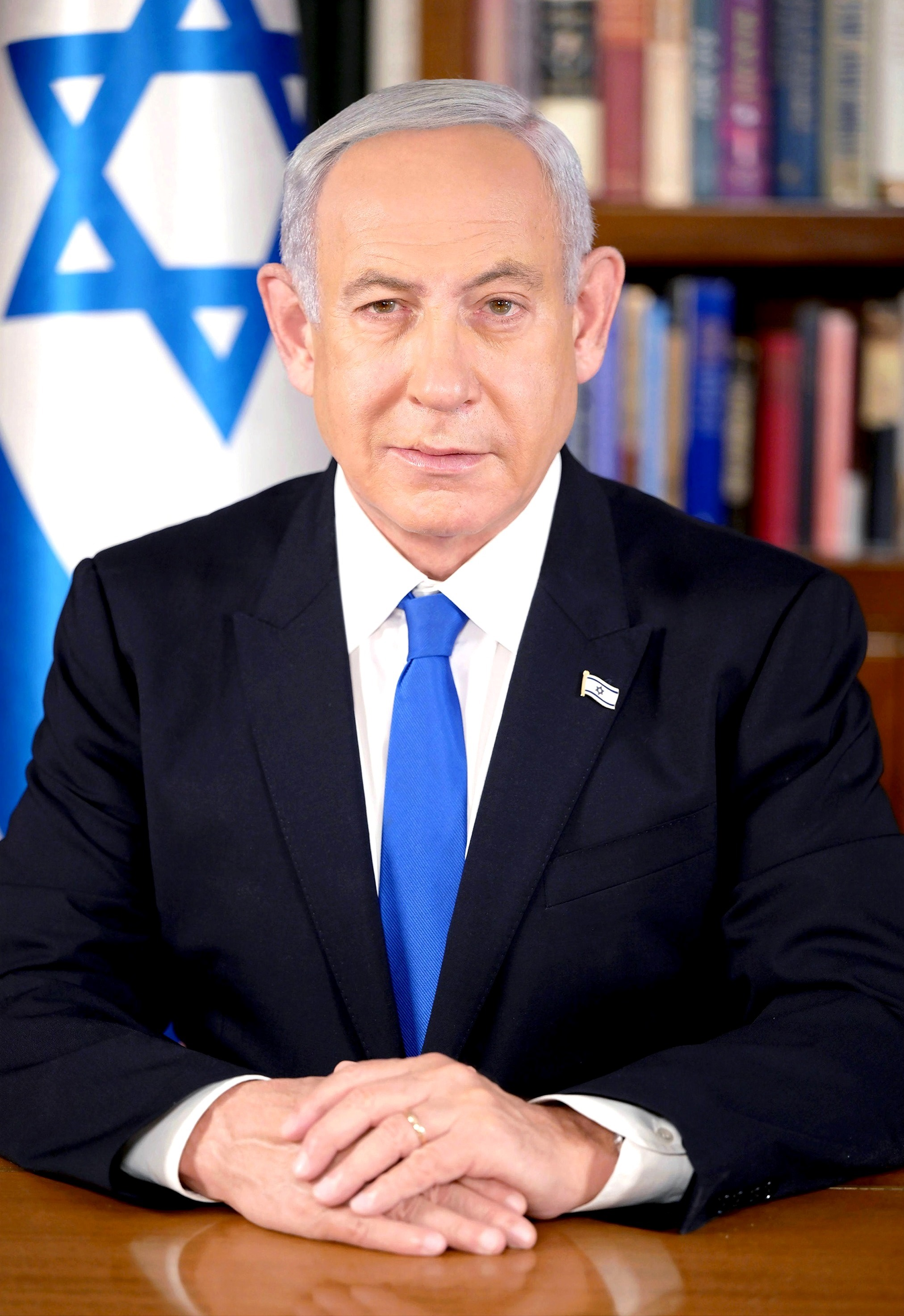
Benjamin Netanyahu
· Prime Minister
· Leader of the Likud party

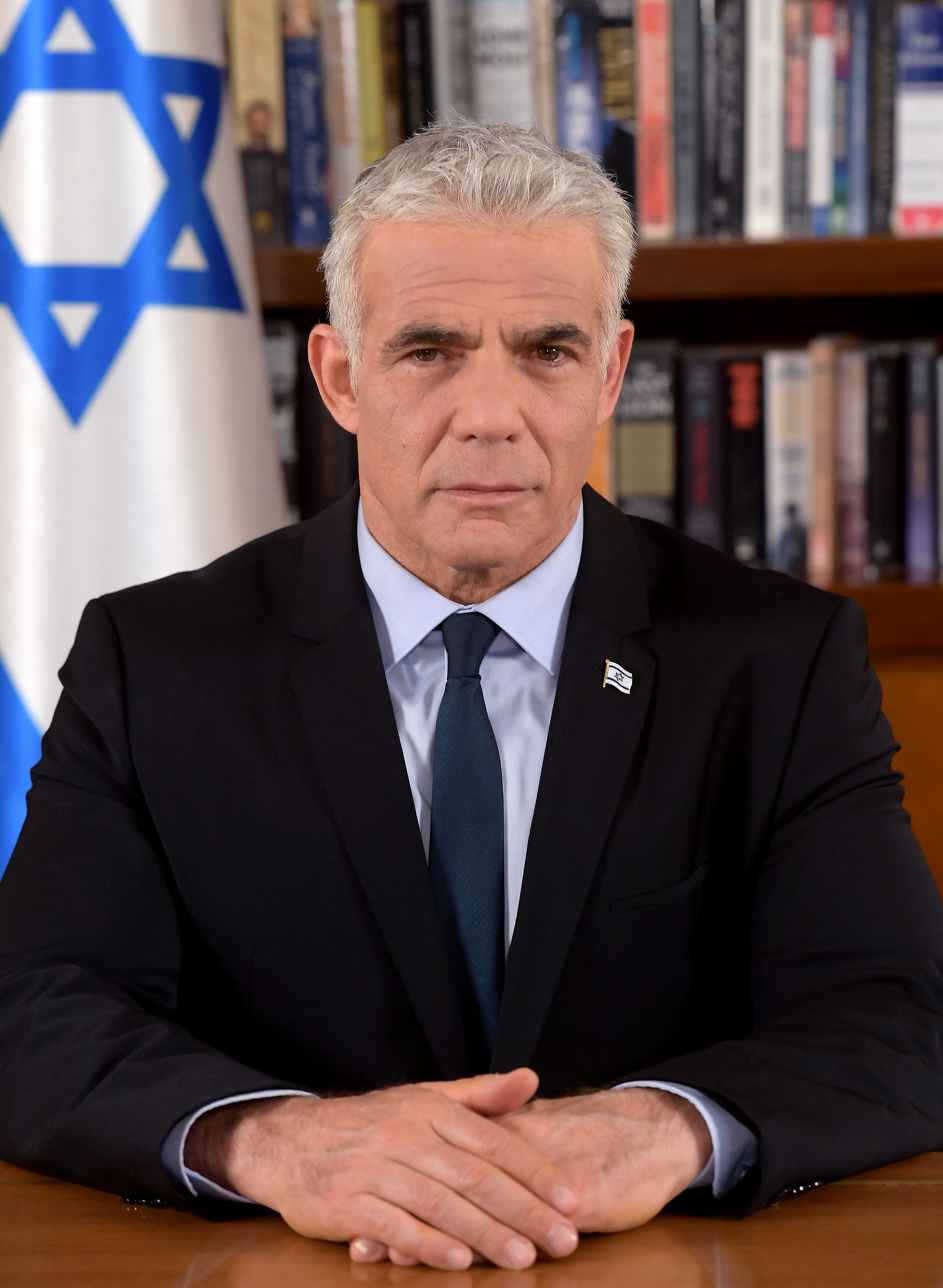
Yair Lapid
· Leader of the Opposition
· Leader of the Yesh Atid party
· Former prime minister

Date	Polling firm	Publisher	Netanyahu	Lapid	Neither	Undecided
4 Jun 25	Midgam R&C	HaHadashot 12	39	22	–	–
17 Mar 25	SF+DP	Channel 14	47	20	33	–
17 Feb 25	Midgam R&C	HaHadashot 12	39	25	–	–
12 Dec 24	SF+DP	Channel 14	53	22	25	–
28 Nov 24	SF+DP	Channel 14	46	23	31	–
19 Nov 24	SF+DP	Channel 14	49	23	28	–
6 Nov 24	SF+DP	Channel 14	48	27	25	–
28 Oct 24	Midgam R&C	HaHadashot 12	41	24	31	4
27 Oct 24	SF+DP	Channel 14	51	23	26	–
29 Sep 24	SF+DP	Channel 14	54	24	22	–
29 Sep 24	Midgam R&C	HaHadashot 12	38	27	29	6
26 Sep 24	SF+DP	Channel 14	46	24	30	–
19 Sep 24	SF+DP	Channel 14	48	27	25	–
9 Sep 24	Midgam R&C	HaHadashot 12	37	29	29	5
22 Aug 24	Midgam R&C	HaHadashot 12	35	27	34	4
15 Aug 24	SF+DP	Channel 14	45	31	24	–
8 Aug 24	SF+DP	Channel 14	49	27	24	–
9 Jul	Timor Group	i24 News	31	29	40	–
25 Jun 24	SF+DP	Channel 14	46	34	20	–
24 Jun 24	Midgam R&C	HaHadashot 12	33	29	33	5
21 Jun 24	Midgam R&C	HaHadashot 12	33	28	34	5
20 Jun 24	SF+DP	Channel 14	41	33	26	–
10 Jun 24	Midgam R&C	HaHadashot 12	33	27	35	5
10 Jun 24	SF+DP	Channel 14	47	25	28	–
10 Jun 24	MM+SN	Channel 13	45	39	–	16
30 May 24	SF+DP	Channel 14	45	31	24	–
29 May 24	Midgam R&C	HaHadashot 12	37	30	30	3
16 May 24	SF+DP	Channel 14	45	30	25	–
9 May 24	SF+DP	Channel 14	48	29	23	–
30 Apr 24	Midgam R&C	HaHadashot 12	34	25	41	–
14 Apr 24	SF+DP	Channel 14	44	28	28	–
7 Apr 24	SF+DP	Channel 14	43	29	28	–
31 Mar 24	SF+DP	Channel 14	44	34	22	–
13 Mar 24	SF+DP	Channel 14	48	28	24	–
12 Mar 24	Midgam R&C	HaHadashot 12	32	27	36	5
11 Feb 24	Midgam R&C	HaHadashot 12	31	25	39	5
30 Jan 24	Midgam R&C	HaHadashot 12	29	27	44	
21 Jan 24	CF+MP+SN	Channel 13	41	36	–	23
11 Jan 24	Midgam R&C	HaHadashot 12	33	28	–	–
6 Jan 24	SF+DP	Channel 14	41	33	26	4
28 Dec 23	CF+MP+SN	Channel 13	44	38	–	18
18 Dec 23	Midgam R&C	HaHadashot 12	32	28	36	4
16 Nov 23	Midgam R&C	HaHadashot 12	29	29	35	7
26 Sep 23	Midgam R&C	HaHadashot 12	39	29	27	5
26 Sep 23	Kantar	Kan 11	41	31	28	–
14 Sep 23	SF+DP	Channel 14	43	31	26	–
10 Sep 23	Midgam R&C	HaHadashot 12	39	28	28	5
6 Sep 23	SF+DP	Channel 14	45	32	23	–
31 Aug 23	SF+DP	Channel 14	42	34	24	–
25 Aug 23	Midgam R&C	HaHadashot 12	38	29	28	5
4 Aug 23	Midgam R&C	HaHadashot 12	38	31	28	3
25 Jul 23	Midgam R&C	HaHadashot 12	38	29	31	2
24 Jul 23	SF+DP	Channel 14	45	31	24	–
21 Jul 23	Midgam R&C	HaHadashot 12	39	24	–	–
13 Jul 23	Midgam R&C	HaHadashot 12	39	30	27	4
13 Jul 23	SF+DP	Channel 14	49	35	16	–
9 Jul 23	Kantar	Kan 11	38	32	–	30
7 Jul 23	Midgam R&C	HaHadashot 12	42	26	32	
29 Jun 23	SF+DP	Channel 14	50	35	15	–
25 Jun 23	Midgam R&C	HaHadashot 12	38	29	26	7
15 Jun 23	Midgam R&C	HaHadashot 12	39	30	28	3
15 Jun 23	SF+DP	Channel 14	39	37	24	–
9 Jun 23	Midgam R&C	HaHadashot 12	38	28	–	34
8 Jun 23	SF+DP	Channel 14	46	36	18	–
30 May 23	Midgam R&C	HaHadashot 12	38	28	27	7
18 May 23	Midgam R&C	HaHadashot 12	42	27	26	5
14 May 23	Kantar	Kan 11	43	33	24	–
14 May 23	SF+DP	Channel 14	47	36	17	–
14 May 23	Midgam R&C	HaHadashot 12	42	28	23	7
7 May 23	CF+MP+SN	Channel 13	44	38	–	18
7 May 23	Midgam R&C	HaHadashot 12	36	26	38	7
30 Apr 23	CF+MP+SN	Channel 13	44	39	–	17
30 Apr 23	Kantar	Kan 11	36	29	35	–
30 Apr 23	SF+DP	Channel 14	44	32	24	–
28 Apr 23	Midgam R&C	HaHadashot 12	38	26	32	4
16 Apr 23	Midgam R&C	HaHadashot 12	38	31	26	5
16 Apr 23	SF+DP	Channel 14	44	34	22	–
9 Apr 23	CF+MP+SN	Channel 13	37	41	–	22
2 Apr 23	SF+DP	Channel 14	48	32	20	–
31 Mar 23	Midgam R&C	HaHadashot 12	32	32	29	7
27 Mar 23	Kantar	Kan 11	31	32	37	–
3 Mar 23	Midgam R&C	HaHadashot 12	41	25	30	4

=== Eisenkot vs. Bennett ===
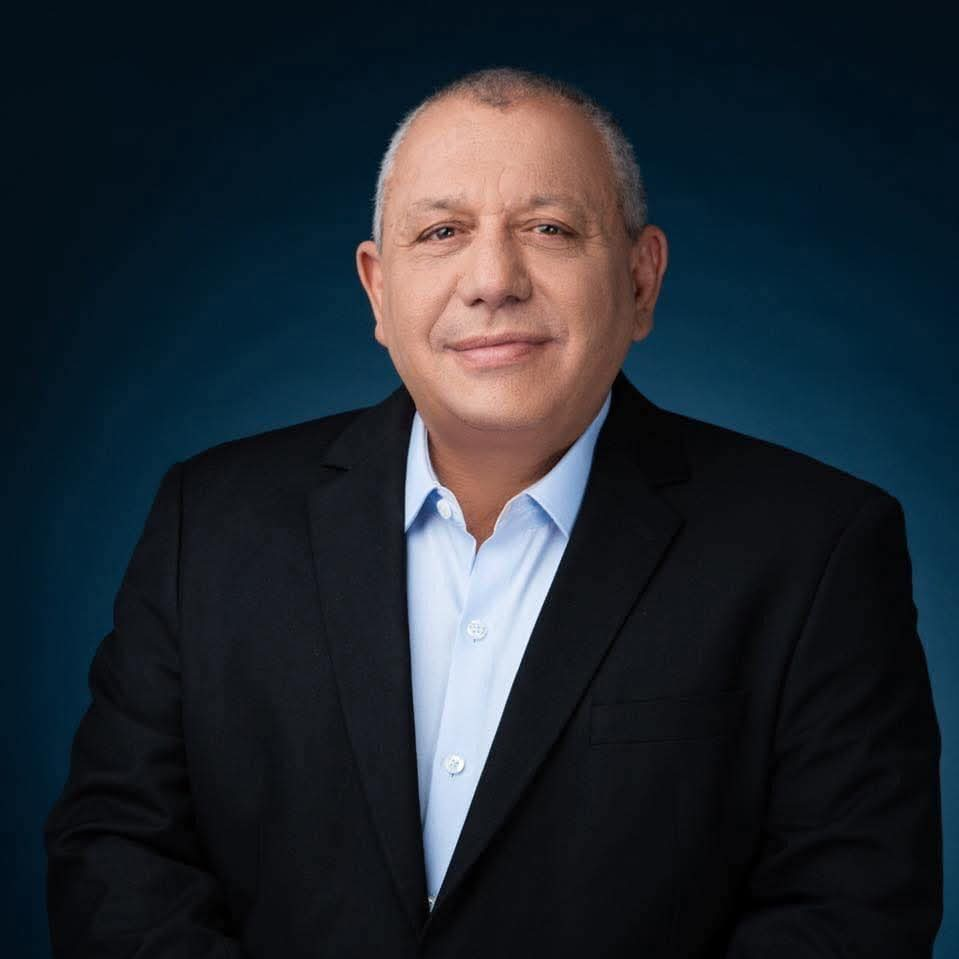
Gadi Eisenkot
· Leader of Yashar
· Former Chief of General Staff

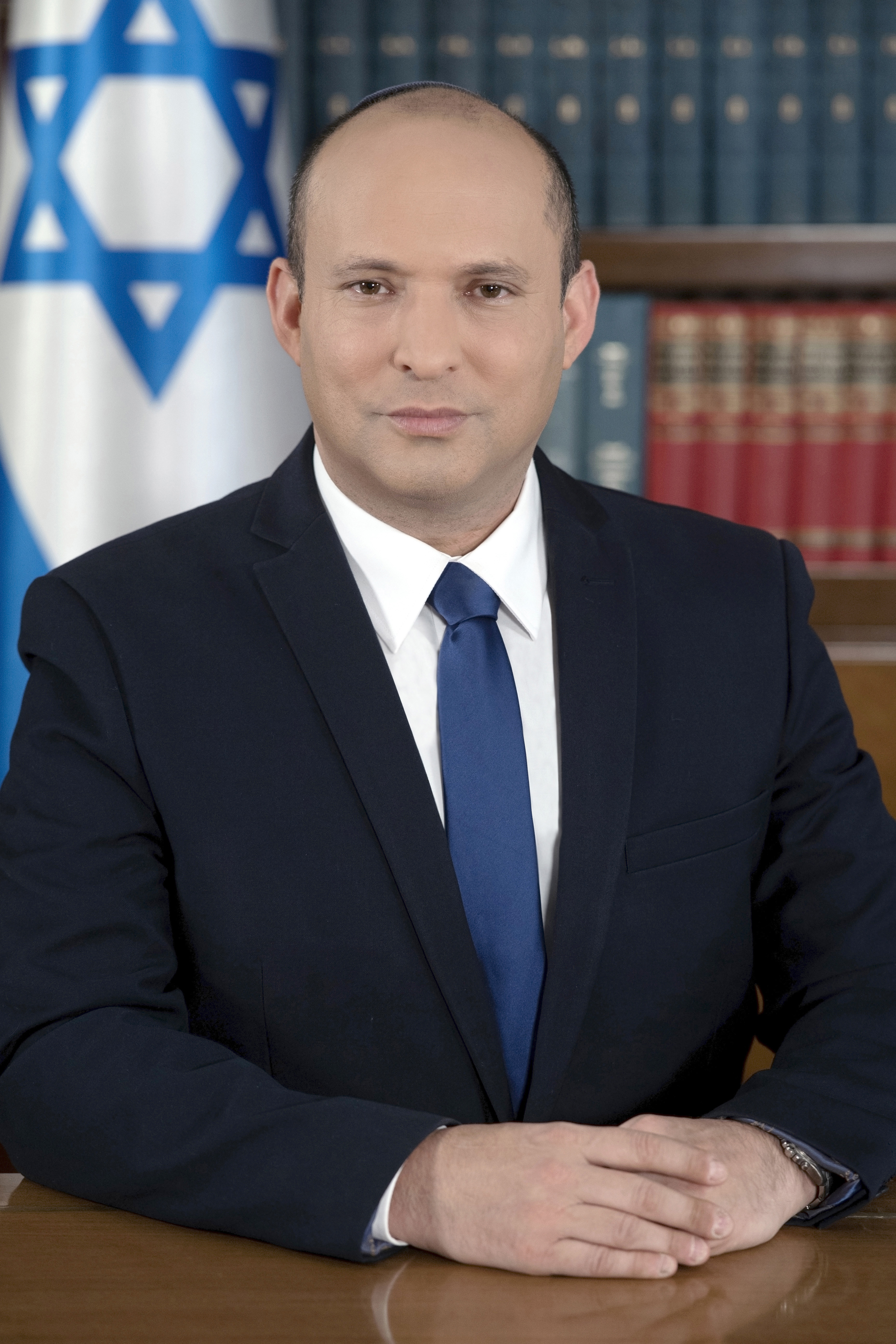
Naftali Bennett
· Former Prime minister
. Leader of the Bennett 2026 party

Date	Polling firm	Publisher	Eisenkot	Bennett	Neither	Undecided
9 Aug 26	Kantar	Kan 11	31	20	49	
2 Aug 26	Kantar	Kan 11	37	15	48	

=== Gantz vs. Bennett ===
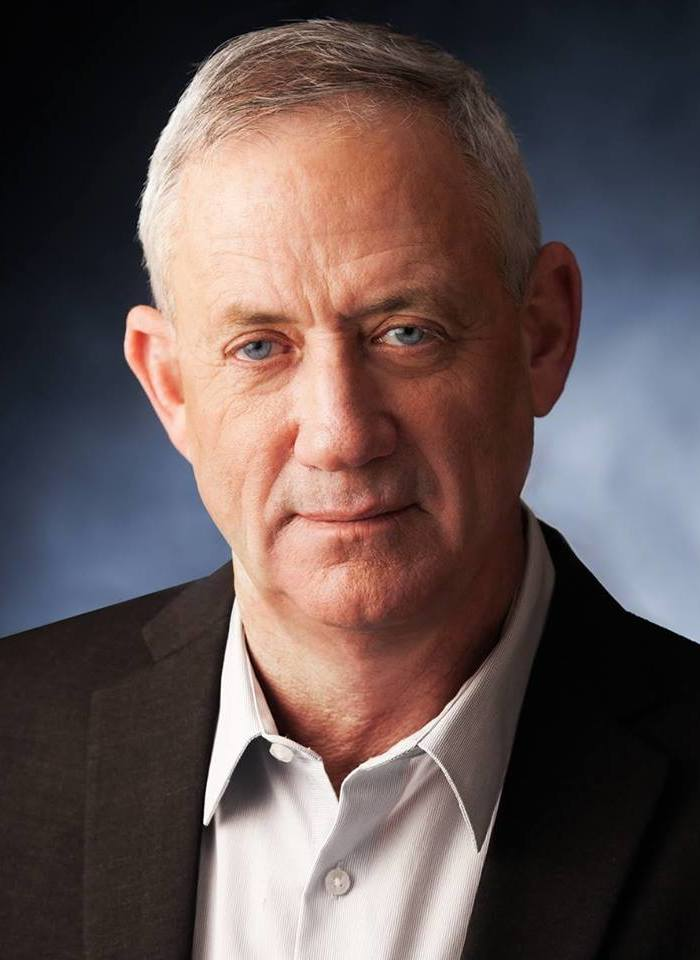
Benny Gantz
· Leader of the National Unity alliance
· Former Alternate Prime minister
· Former Speaker of the Knesset

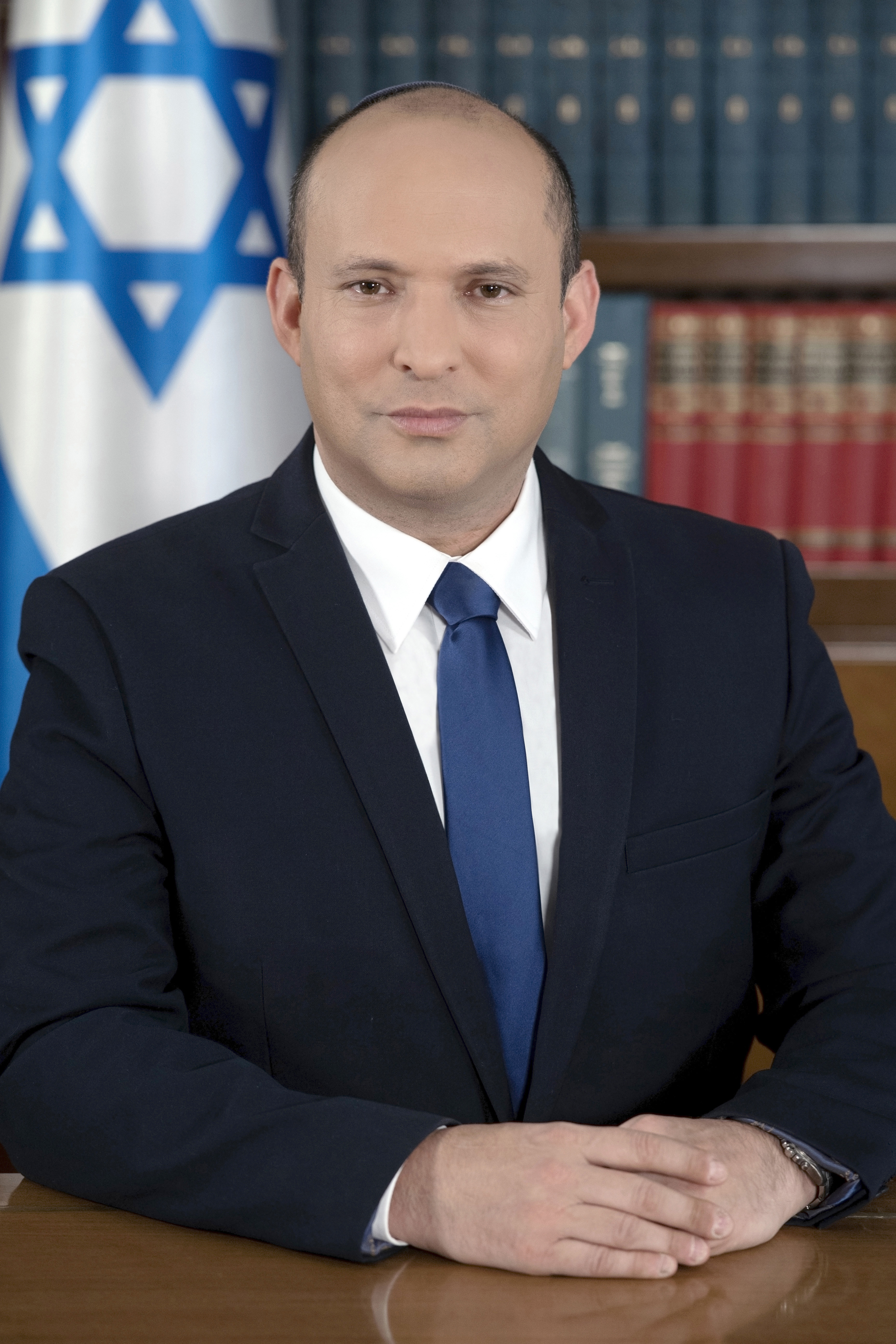
Naftali Bennett
· Former Prime minister

Date	Polling firm	Publisher	Gantz	Bennett	Neither	Undecided
21 Jun 24	Midgam R&C	HaHadashot 12	25	27	41	7

=== Netanyahu vs. Barkat ===
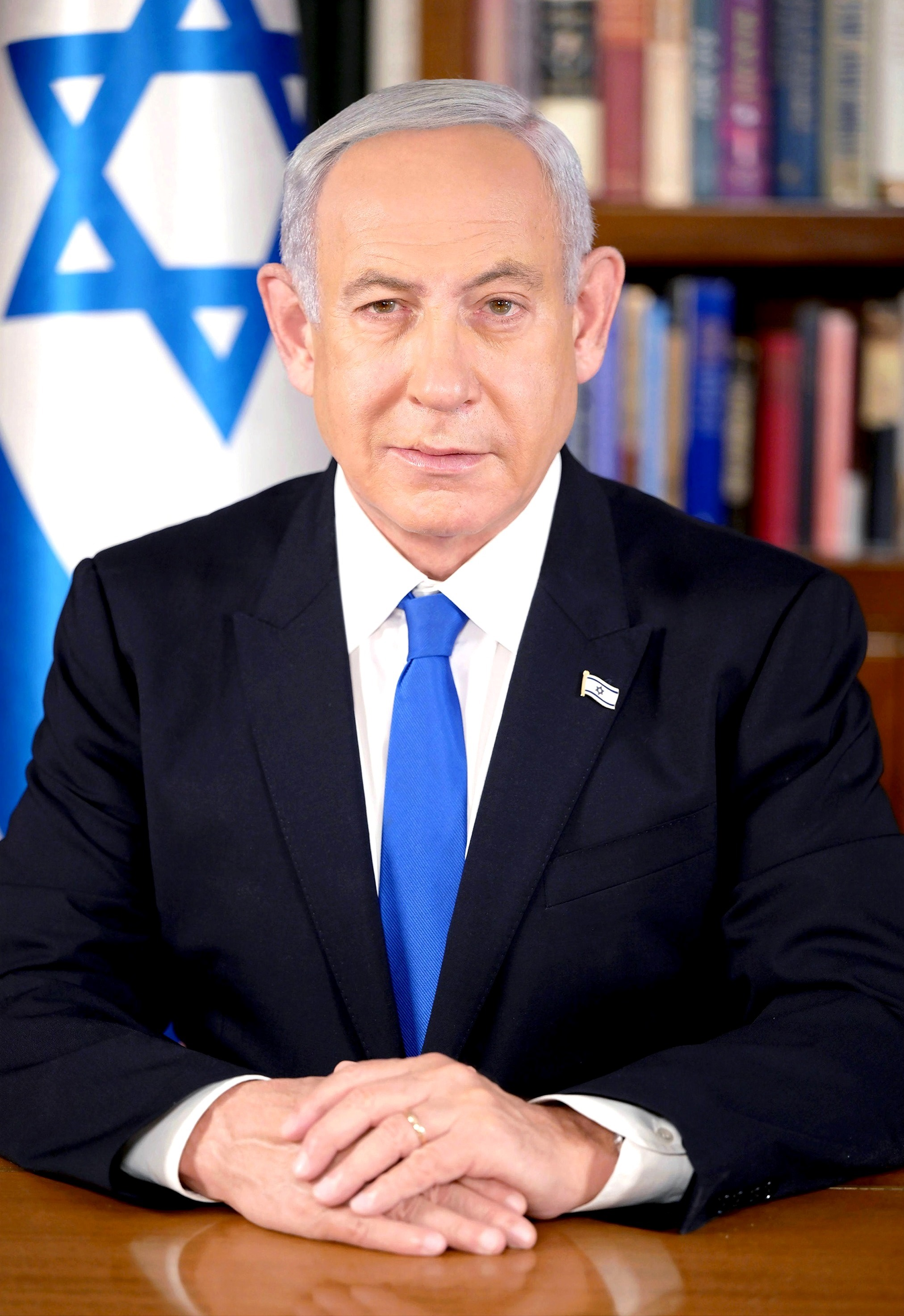
Benjamin Netanyahu
· Prime Minister
· Leader of the Likud party

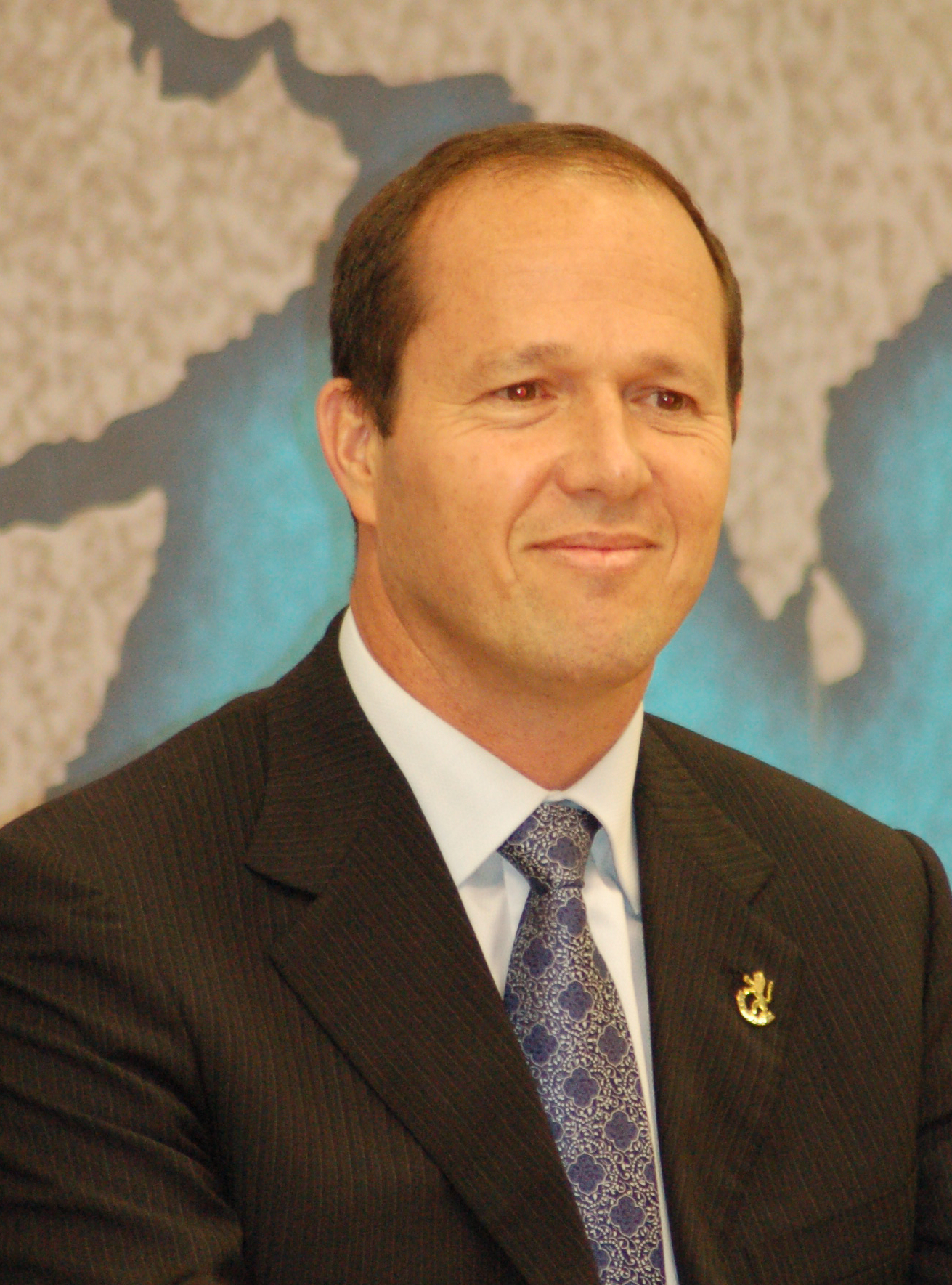
Nir Barkat
· Minister of Economy
· Member of the Likud party

Date	Polling firm	Publisher	Netanyahu	Barkat	Neither	Undecided
21 Jun 24	Midgam R&C	HaHadashot 12	29	12	–	–

=== Netanyahu vs. Gallant ===
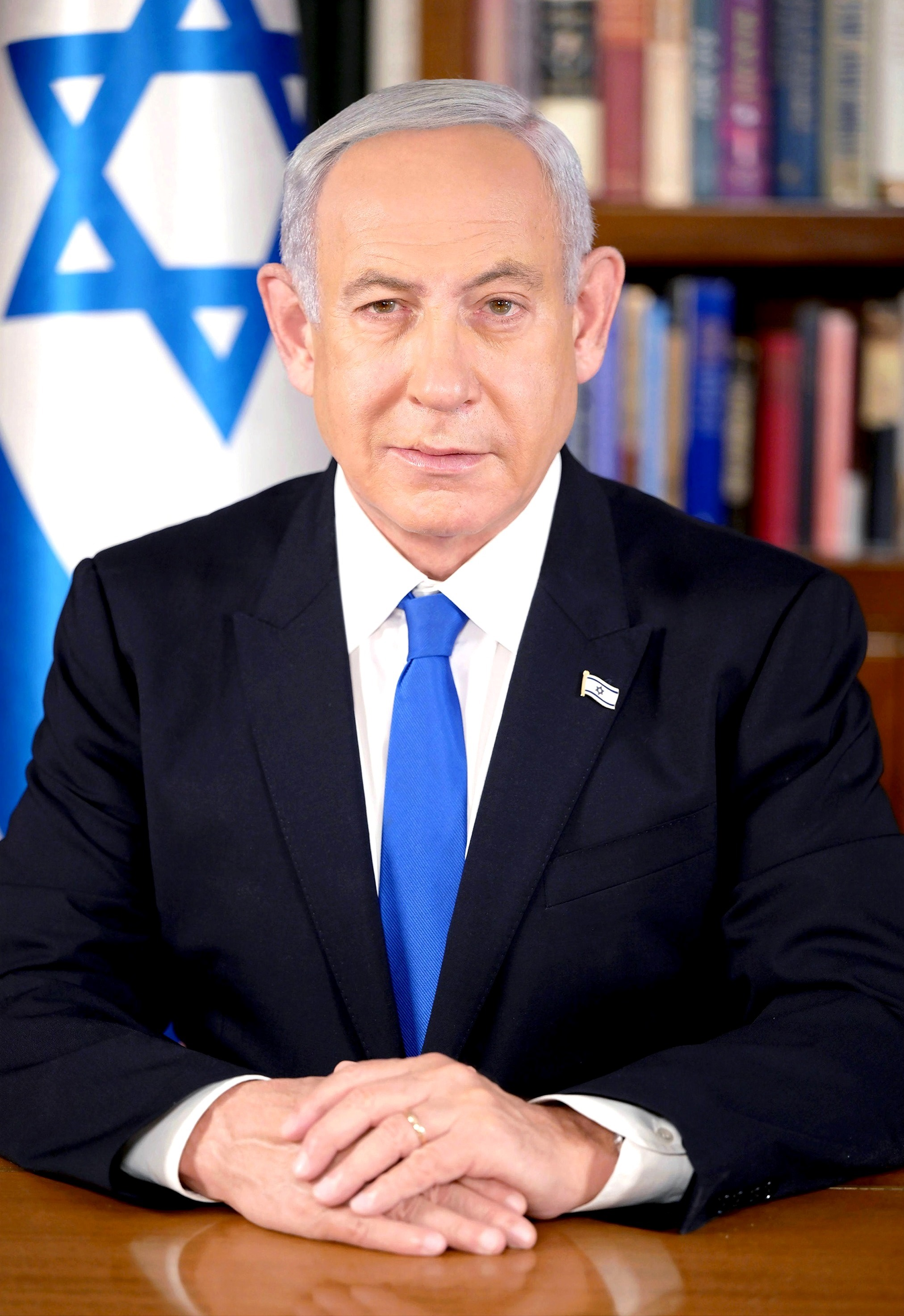
Benjamin Netanyahu
· Prime Minister
· Leader of the Likud party

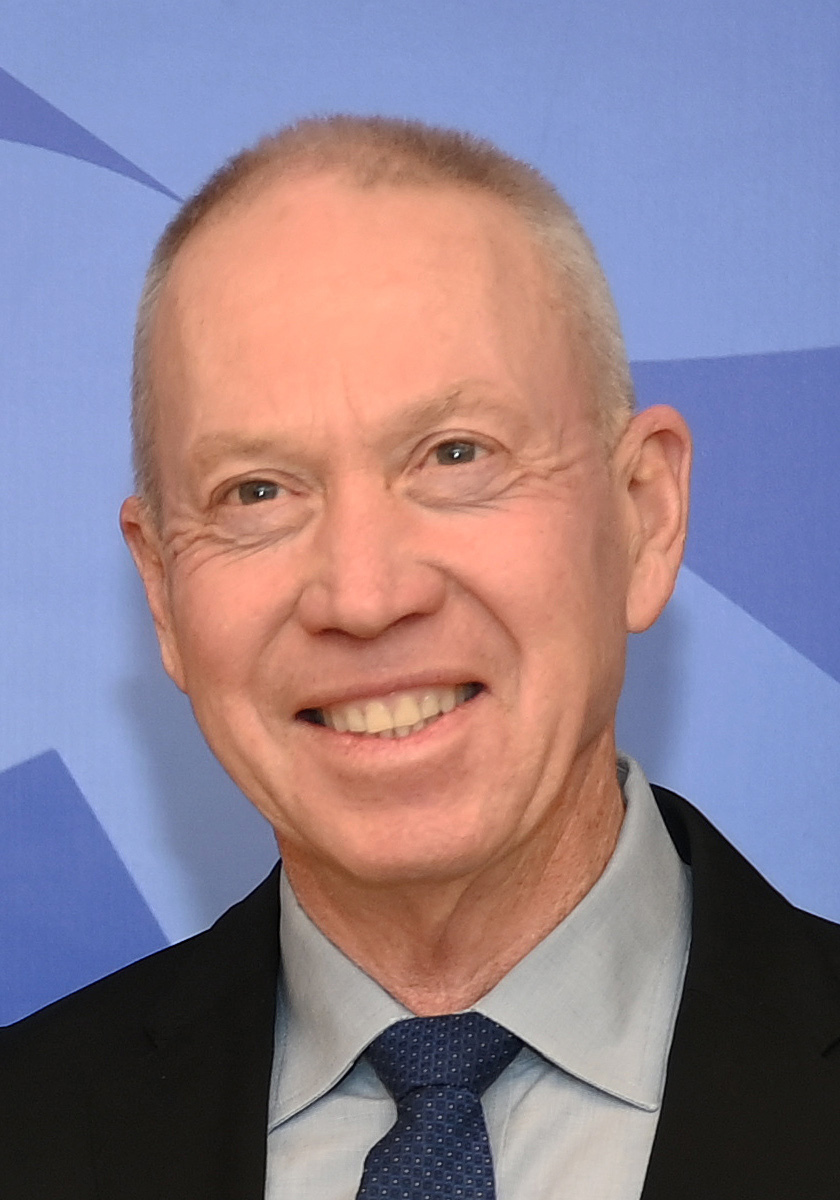
Yoav Gallant
· Minister of Defense
· Member of the Likud party

Date	Polling firm	Publisher	Netanyahu	Gallant	Neither	Undecided
21 Jun 24	Midgam R&C	HaHadashot 12	30	15	–	–

=== Gantz vs. Lieberman ===
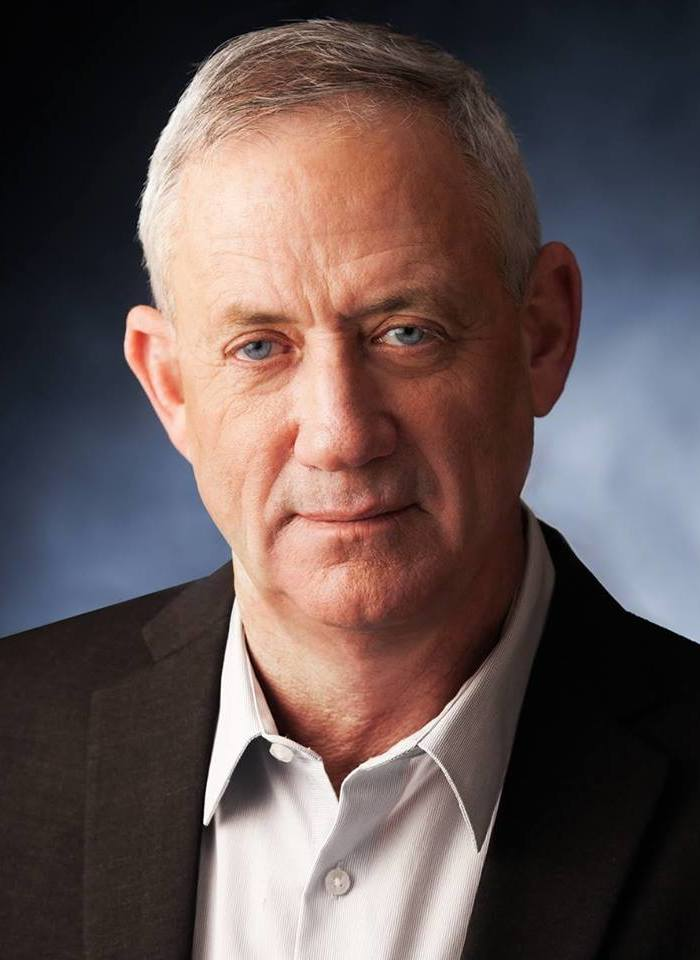
Benny Gantz
· Leader of the National Unity alliance
· Former Alternate Prime minister
· Former Speaker of the Knesset

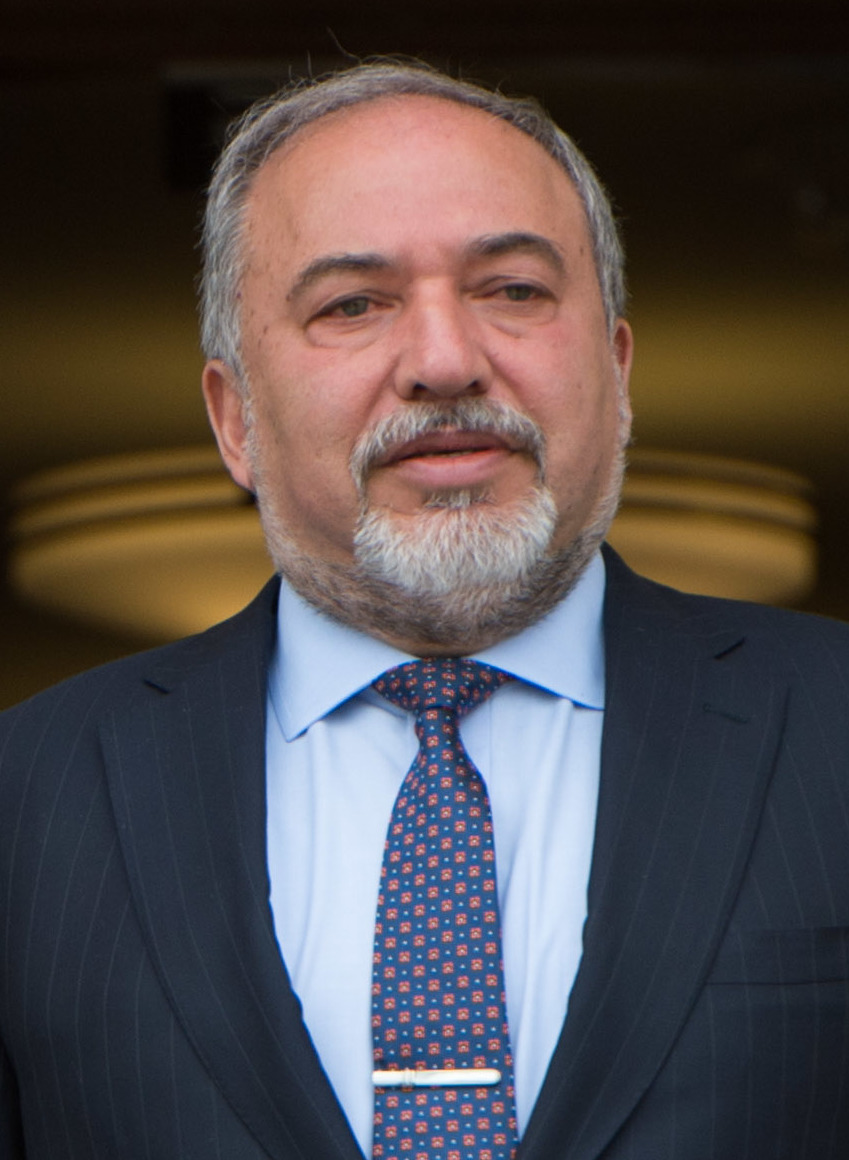
Avigdor Lieberman
· Former Minister of Defense
· Leader of the Yisrael Beiteinu party

Date	Polling firm	Publisher	Gantz	Lieberman	Neither	Undecided
13 Jun 24	LRI+P4A	Maariv	42	21	–	37

=== Gantz vs. Levin ===
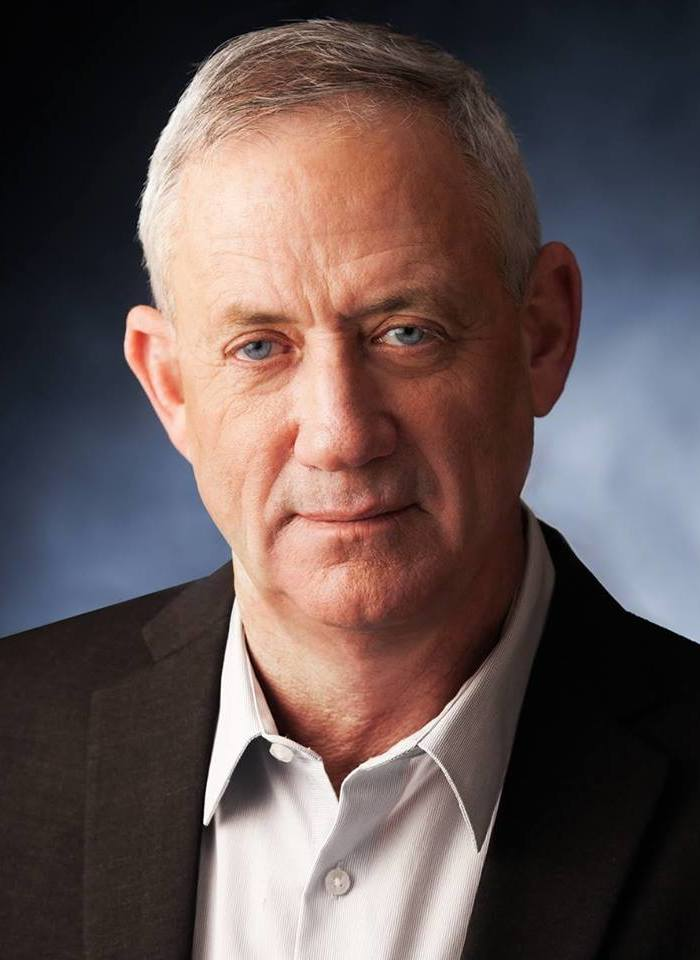
Benny Gantz
· Leader of the National Unity alliance
· Former Alternate Prime minister
· Former Speaker of the Knesset

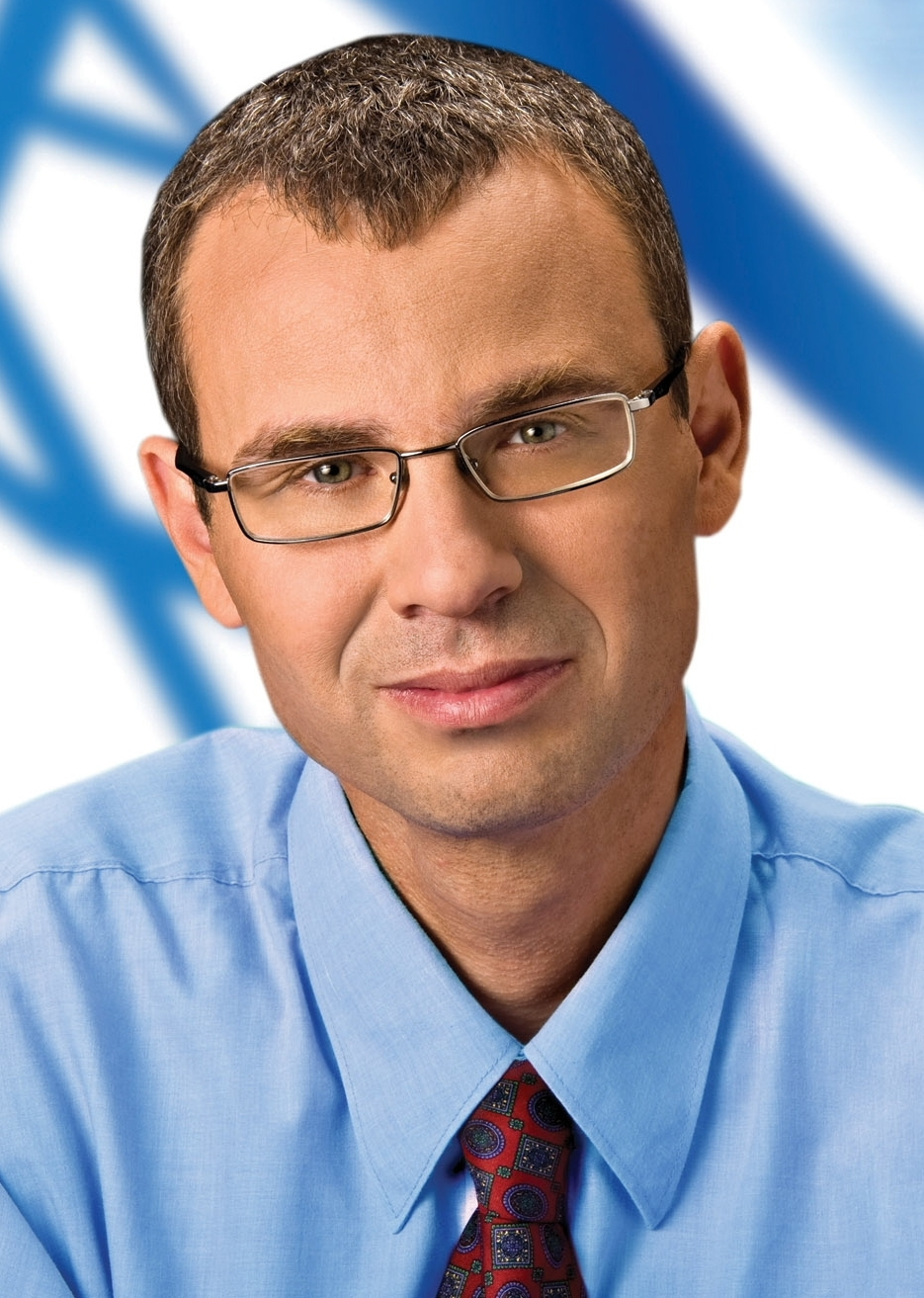
Yariv Levin
· Deputy Prime Minister
· Minister of Justice
· Member of the Likud party

Date	Polling firm	Publisher	Gantz	Levin	Neither	Undecided
26 Jul 23	Midgam R&C	HaHadashot 12	41	17	37	5

=== Lapid vs. Levin ===
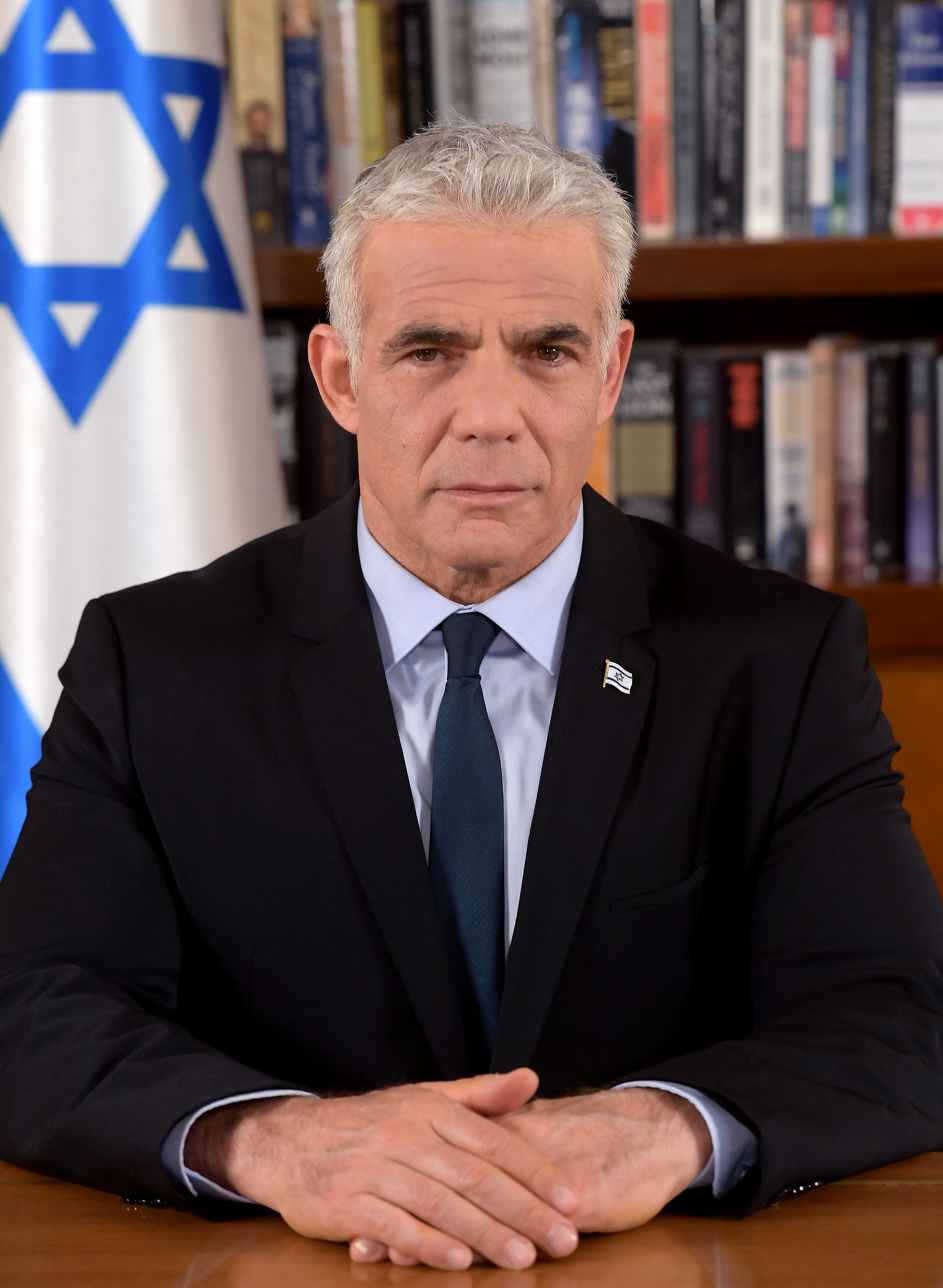
Yair Lapid
· Leader of the Opposition
· Leader of the Yesh Atid party
· Former Prime minister

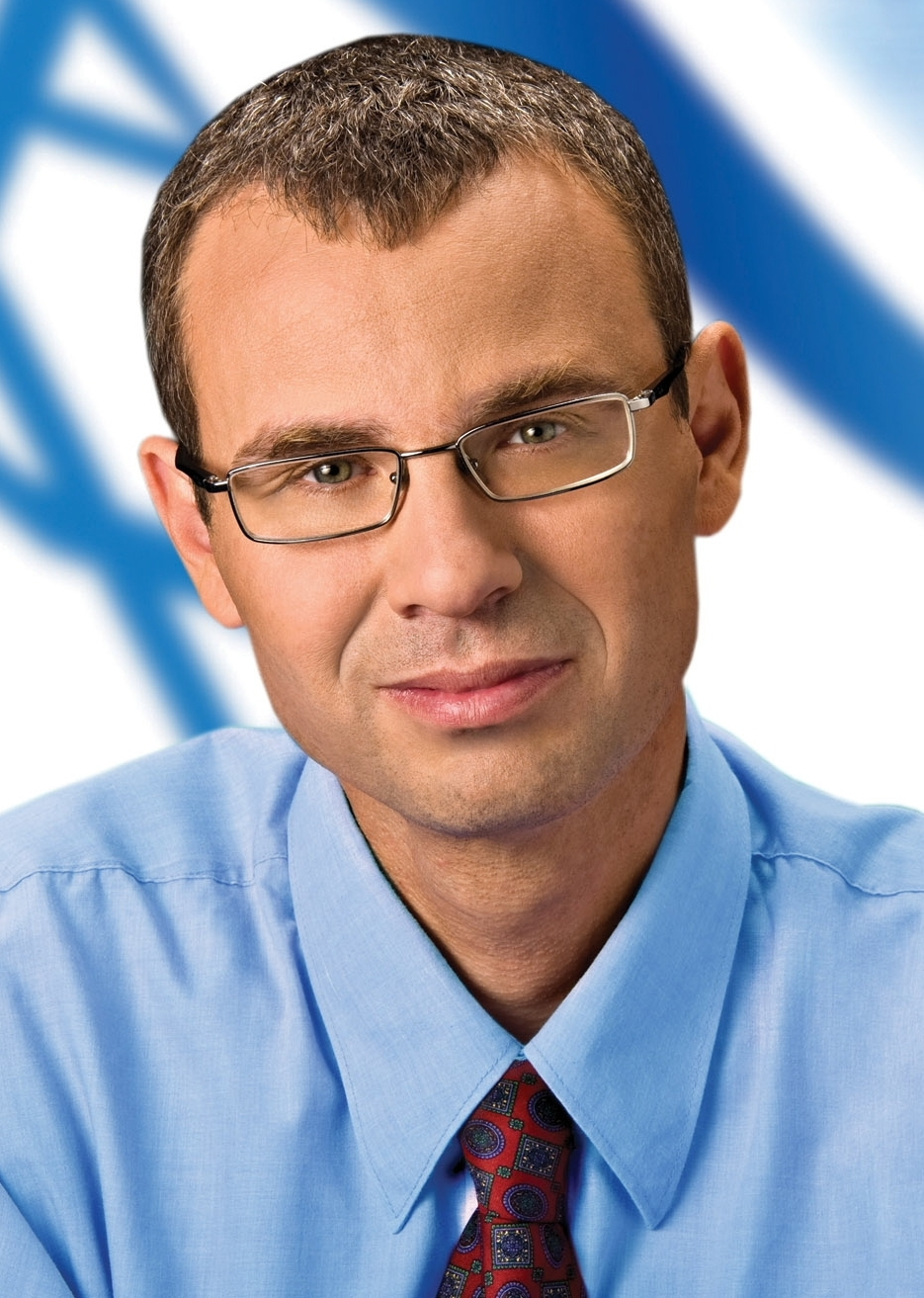
Yariv Levin
· Deputy Prime Minister
· Minister of Justice
· Member of the Likud party

Date	Polling firm	Publisher	Lapid	Levin	Neither	Undecided
26 Jul 23	Midgam R&C	HaHadashot 12	26	19	49	6

== Approval polling ==
=== Government party figures ===
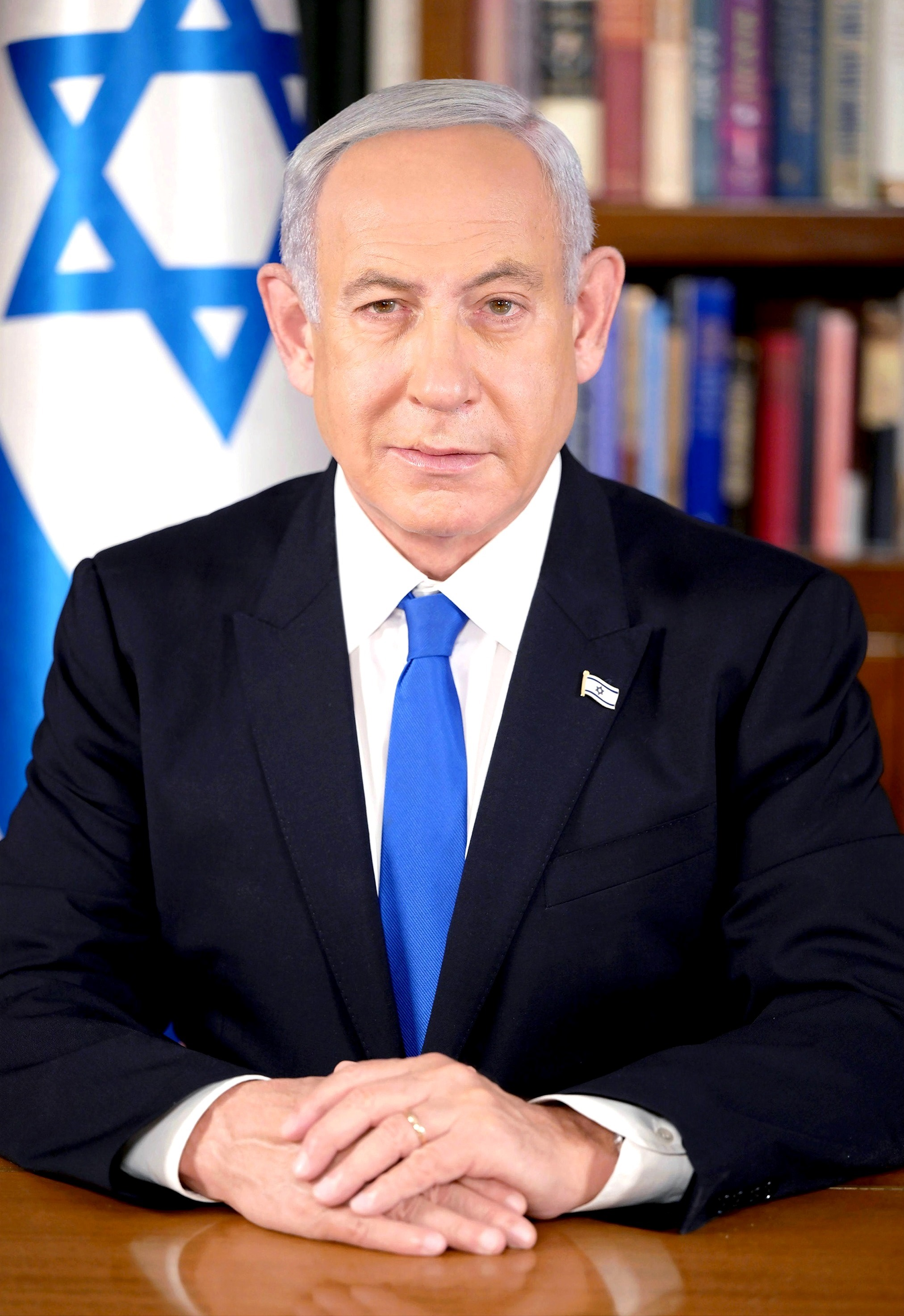
Benjamin Netanyahu

· Prime Minister
· Leader of the Likud party

Date	Polling firm	Publisher	Approve	Mixed	Disapprove	Undecided
25 Jul 26	Midgam R&C	HaHadashot 12	33	–	59 (Note: Anyone but Netanyahu)	8
21 Jun 24	Midgam R&C	HaHadashot 12	–	–	63	–
7 Jan 24	Kantar	Kan 11	–	–	64	–
11–12 Oct 23	LRI+P4A	Maariv	42	–	–	–
30 Jul 23	Maagar Mochot	Israel Hayom	27	–	59	14
7 May 23	Midgam R&C	HaHadashot 12	33	–	61	6
3 May 23	Kantar	Kan 11	26	–	67	7
9 Apr 23	CF+MP+SN	Channel 13	20	–	71	9
6 Apr 23	Midgam R&C	HaHadashot 12	30	–	67	3
27 Mar 23	Midgam R&C	HaHadashot 12	25	–	68	7
26 Mar 23	CF+MP+SN	Channel 13	19	21	56	4
28 Feb 23	Midgam R&C	HaHadashot 12	35	–	59	6
17 Feb 23	Midgam R&C	HaHadashot 12	42	–	54	4

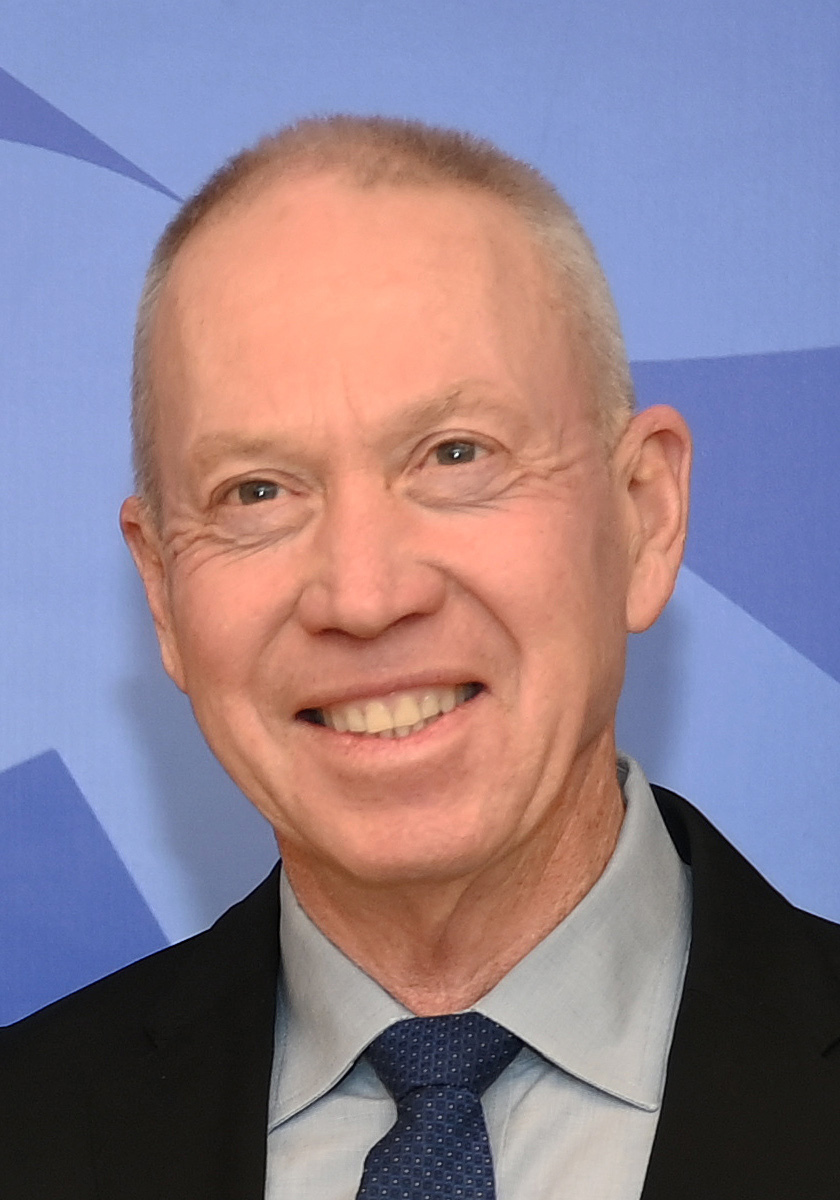
Yoav Gallant

· Minister of Defense
· Member of the Likud party

Date	Polling firm	Publisher	Approve	Disapprove	Undecided
21 Jun 24	Midgam R&C	HaHadashot 12	45	46	–
7 Jan 24	Kantar	Kan 11	63	–	–
11–12 Oct 23	LRI+P4A	Maariv	54	–	–
30 Jul 23	Maagar Mochot	Israel Hayom	30	35	35
23 Jun 23	Midgam R&C	HaHadashot 12	56	32	12
7 May 23	Midgam R&C	HaHadashot 12	44	43	13
3 May 23	Kantar	Kan 11	50	35	15
6 Apr 23	Midgam R&C	HaHadashot 12	56	33	11
28 Feb 23	Midgam R&C	HaHadashot 12	38	45	17
17 Feb 23	Midgam R&C	HaHadashot 12	44	35	21

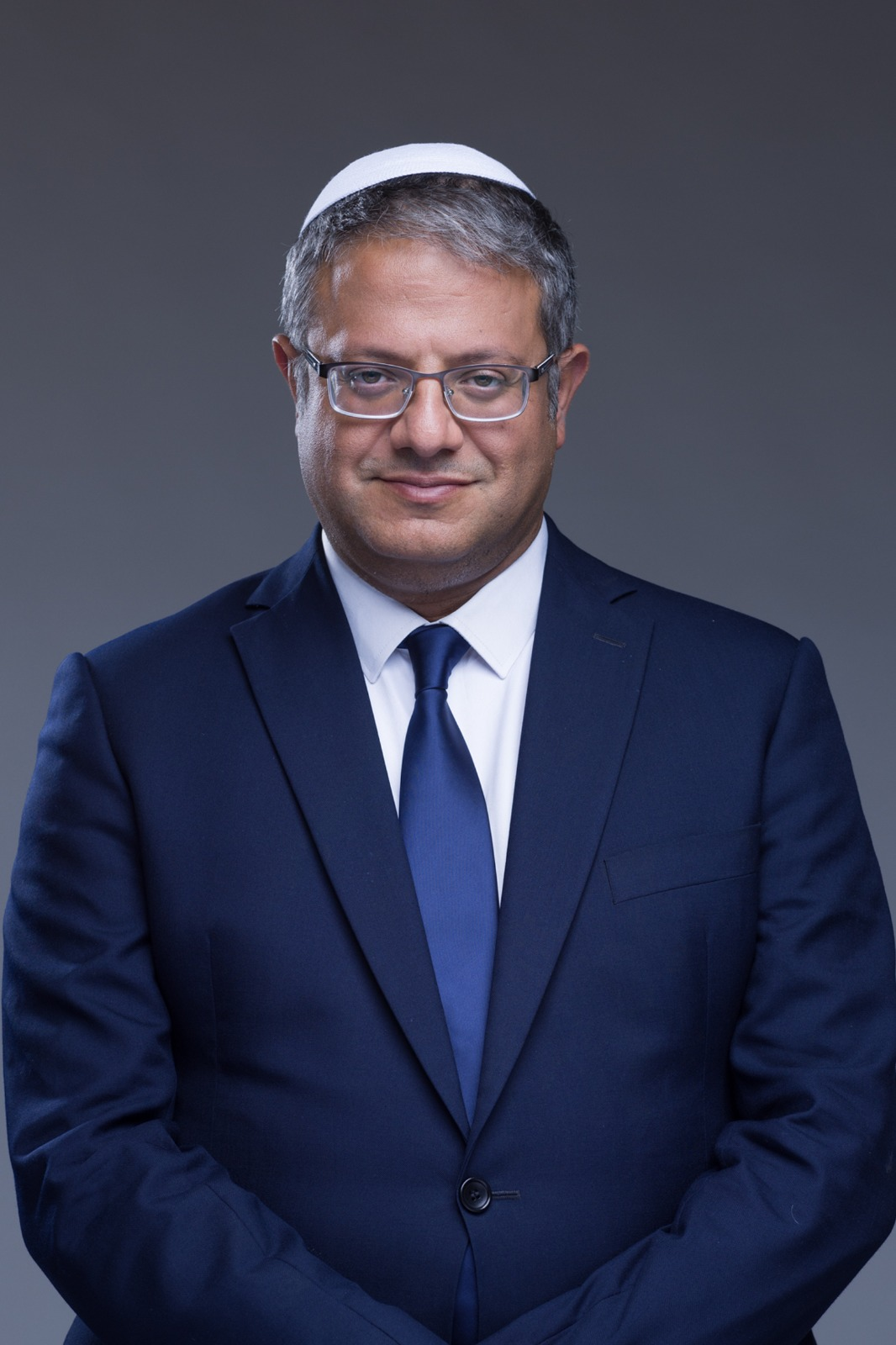
Itamar Ben-Gvir

· Minister of National Security
· Leader of the Otzma Yehudit party

Date	Polling firm	Publisher	Approve	Disapprove	Undecided
21 Jun 24	Midgam R&C	HaHadashot 12	–	65	–
25 Aug 23	Midgam R&C	HaHadashot 12	25	69	6
30 Jul 23	Maagar Mochot	Israel Hayom	20	65	15
23 Jun 23	Midgam R&C	HaHadashot 12	23	72	5
7 May 23	Midgam R&C	HaHadashot 12	25	69	6
3 May 23	Kantar	Kan 11	18	72	10
30 Apr 23	Kantar	Kan 11	19	73	8
6 Apr 23	Midgam R&C	HaHadashot 12	30	66	4
28 Feb 23	Midgam R&C	HaHadashot 12	32	62	6
17 Feb 23	Midgam R&C	HaHadashot 12	36	58	6

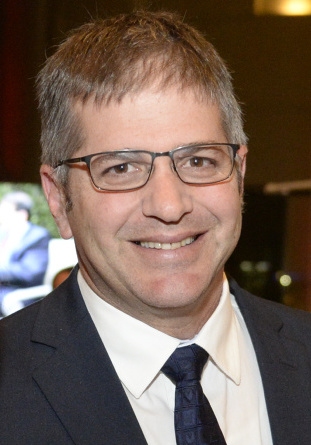
Yoav Kisch

· Minister of Education
· Minister of Regional Cooperation
· Member of the Likud party

Date	Polling firm	Publisher	Approve	Disapprove	Undecided
21 Jun 24	Midgam R&C	HaHadashot 12	23	45	32
25 Aug 23	Midgam R&C	HaHadashot 12	24	53	23
30 Jul 23	Maagar Mochot	Israel Hayom	17	49	34
23 Jun 23	Midgam R&C	HaHadashot 12	28	55	17
3 May 23	Kantar	Kan 11	26	–	–

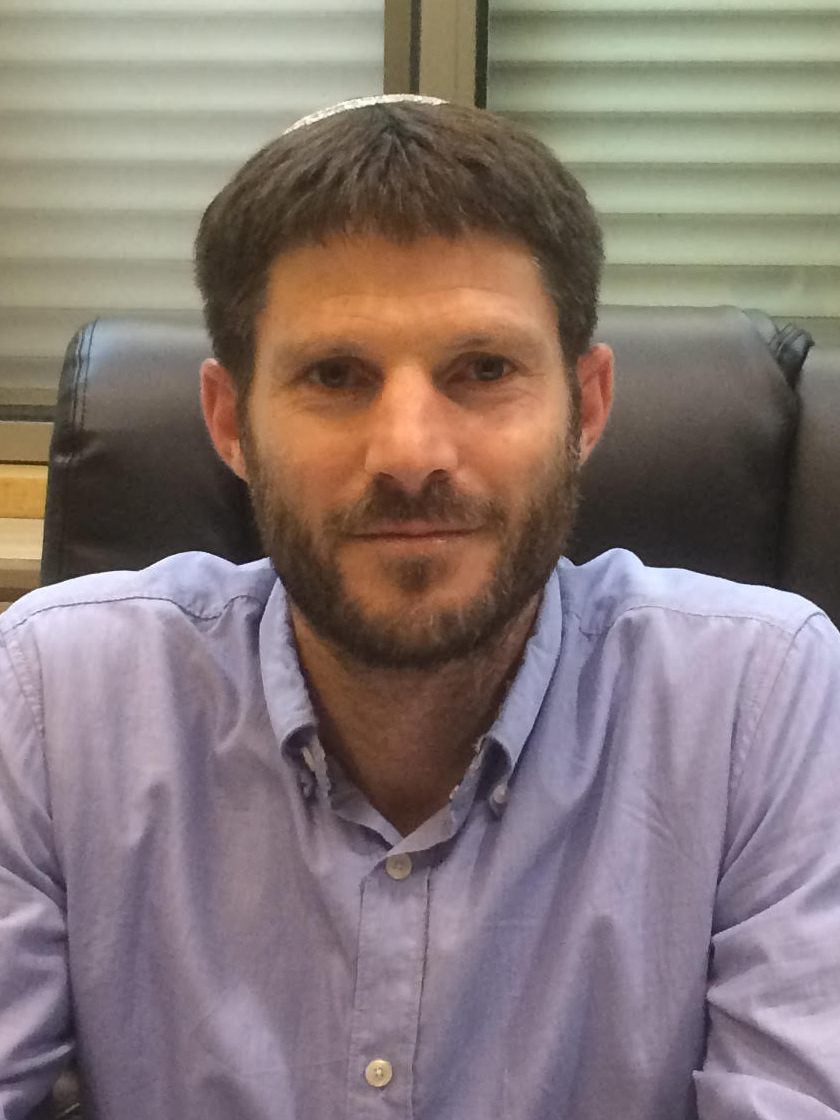
Bezalel Smotrich

· Minister of Finance
· A Minister in the Ministry of Defense
· Leader of the Religious Zionist Party

Date	Polling firm	Publisher	Approve	Disapprove	Undecided
21 Jun 24	Midgam R&C	HaHadashot 12	–	68	–
30 Jul 23	Maagar Mochot	Israel Hayom	23	64	13
23 Jun 23	Midgam R&C	HaHadashot 12	26	67	7
7 May 23	Midgam R&C	HaHadashot 12	24	66	10
3 May 23	Kantar	Kan 11	21	67	12
6 Apr 23	Midgam R&C	HaHadashot 12	28	65	7
28 Feb 23	Midgam R&C	HaHadashot 12	30	62	8
17 Feb 23	Midgam R&C	HaHadashot 12	32	58	10

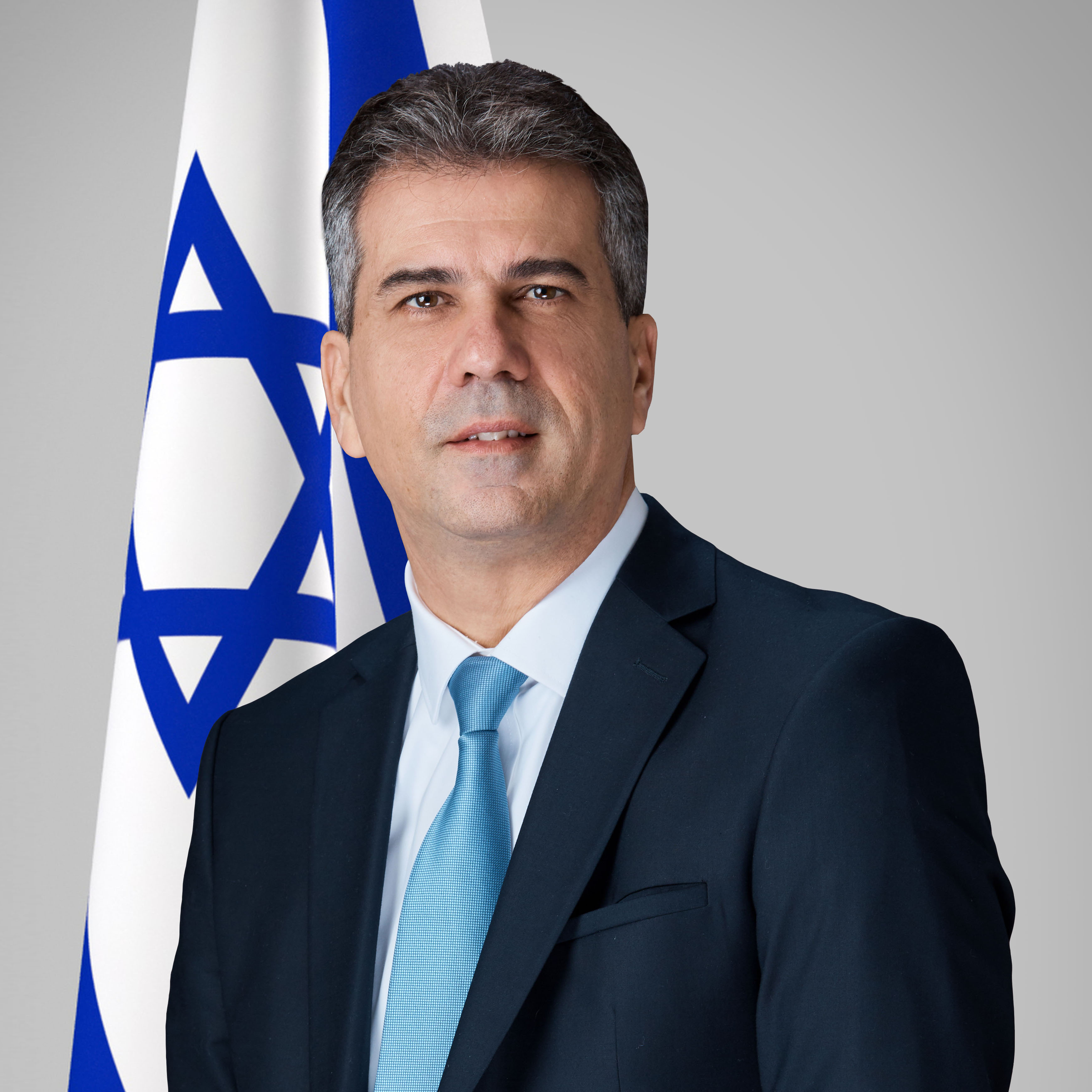
Eli Cohen

· Minister of Foreign Affairs
· Member of the Likud party

Date	Polling firm	Publisher	Approve	Disapprove	Undecided
23 Jun 23	Midgam R&C	HaHadashot 12	34	44	22
3 May 23	Kantar	Kan 11	33	–	–

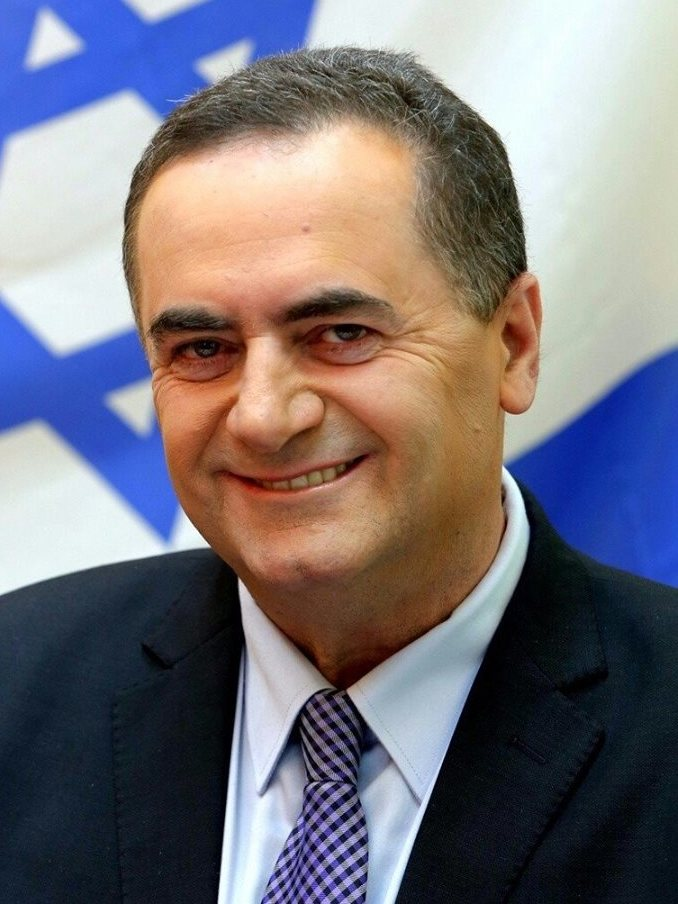
Israel Katz

· Minister of National Infrastructure, Energy, and Water
· Member of the Likud party

Date	Polling firm	Publisher	Approve	Disapprove	Undecided
23 Jun 23	Midgam R&C	HaHadashot 12	27	47	26

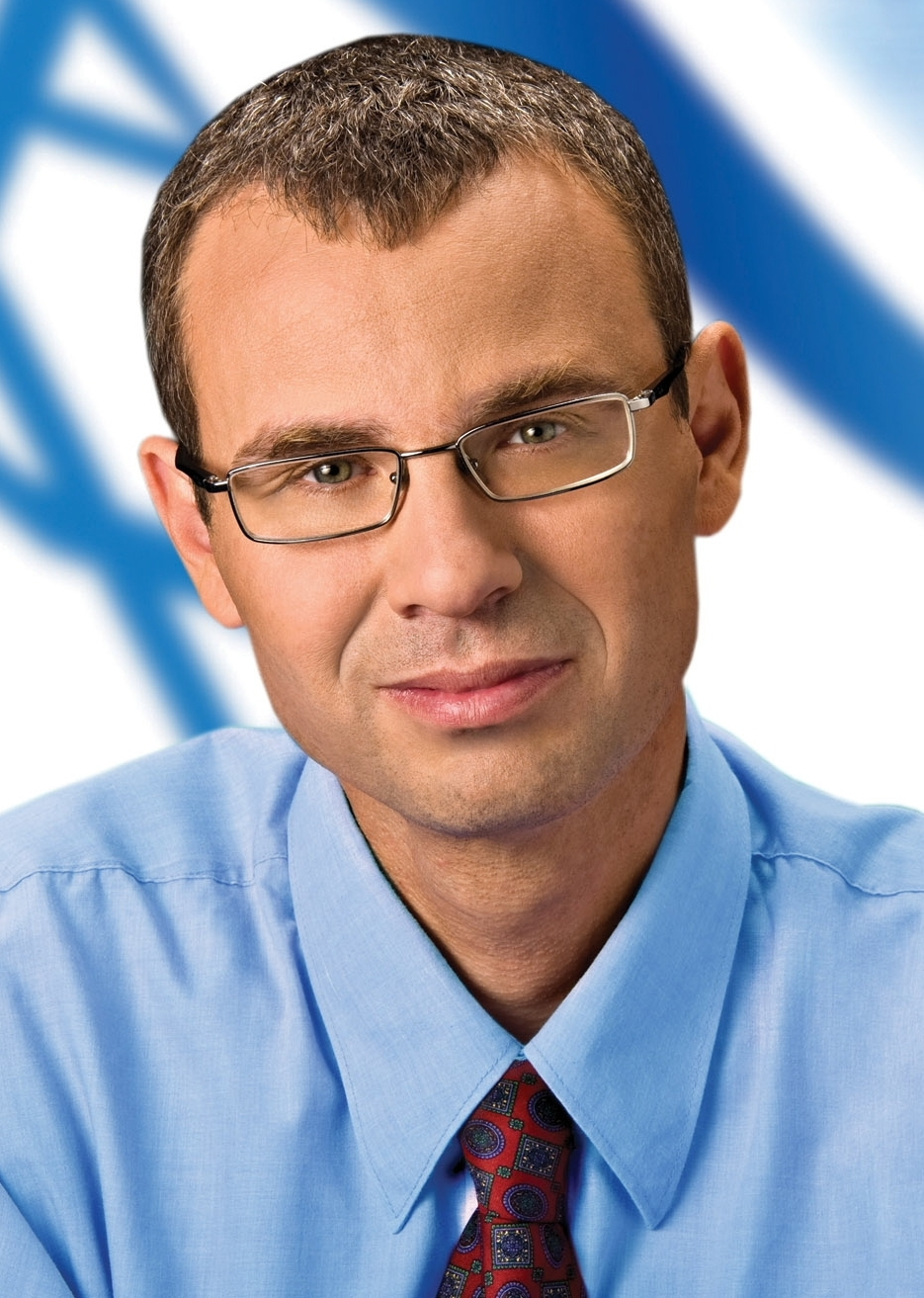
Yariv Levin

· Deputy Prime Minister
· Minister of Justice
· Member of the Likud party

Date	Polling firm	Publisher	Approve	Disapprove	Undecided
23 Jun 23	Midgam R&C	HaHadashot 12	25	63	12
3 May 23	Kantar	Kan 11	24	59	17
21 Mar 23	SF+DP	Channel 14	37	58	–
17 Feb 23	Midgam R&C	HaHadashot 12	29	56	15

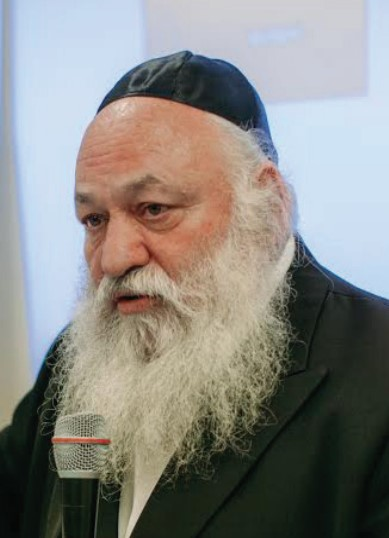
Yitzhak Goldknopf

· Minister of Housing & Construction
· Leader of the Agudat Yisrael party

Date	Polling firm	Publisher	Approve	Disapprove	Undecided
23 Jun 23	Midgam R&C	HaHadashot 12	17	59	24
3 May 23	Kantar	Kan 11	15	–	–

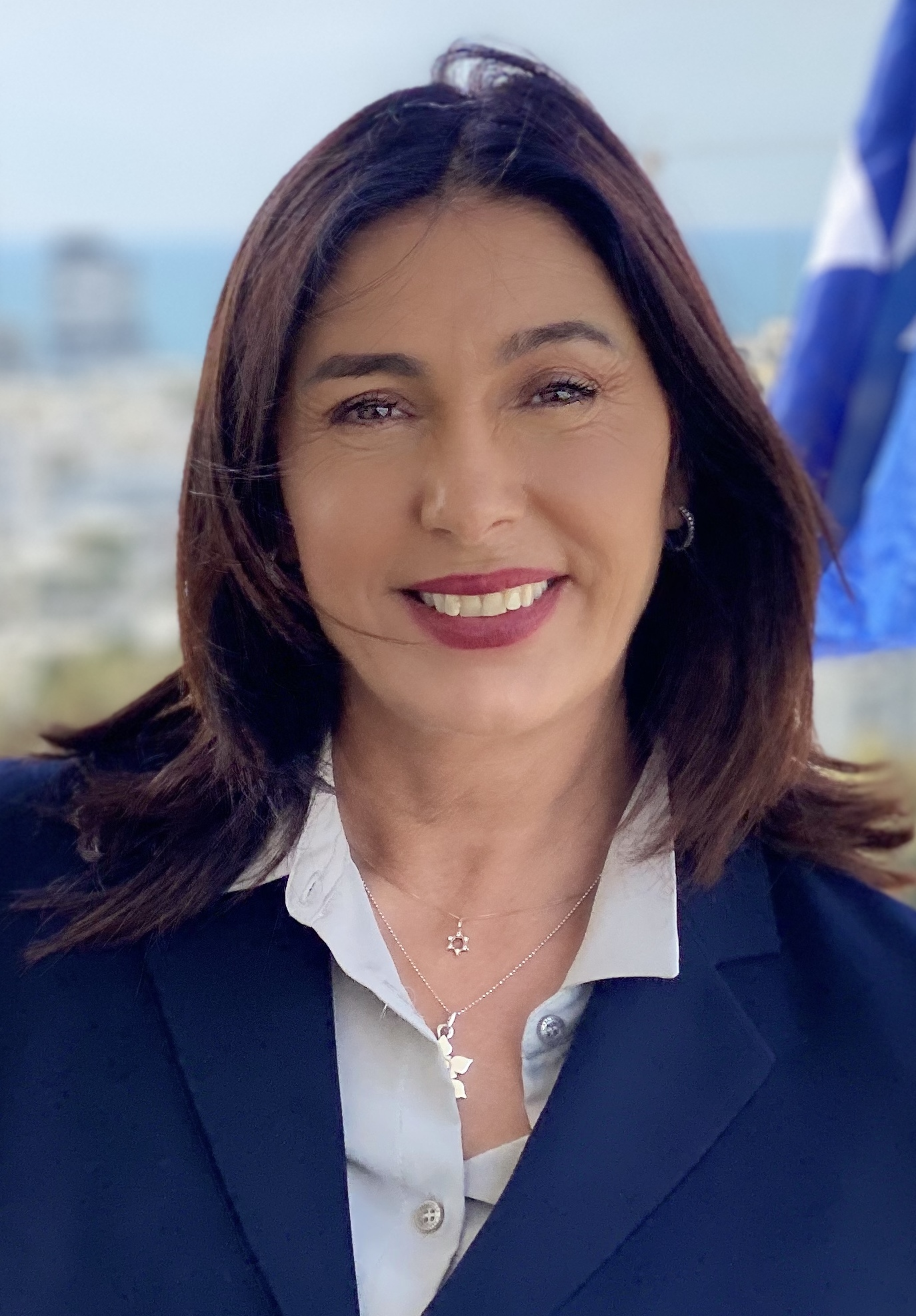
Miri Regev

· Minister of Transport, National Infrastructure and Road Safety
· Member of the Likud party

Date	Polling firm	Publisher	Approve	Disapprove	Undecided
23 Jun 23	Midgam R&C	HaHadashot 12	28	62	10
2 Jun 23	Midgam R&C	HaHadashot 12	29	58	13
3 May 23	Kantar	Kan 11	32	–	–
6 Apr 23	Midgam R&C	HaHadashot 12	23	63	14

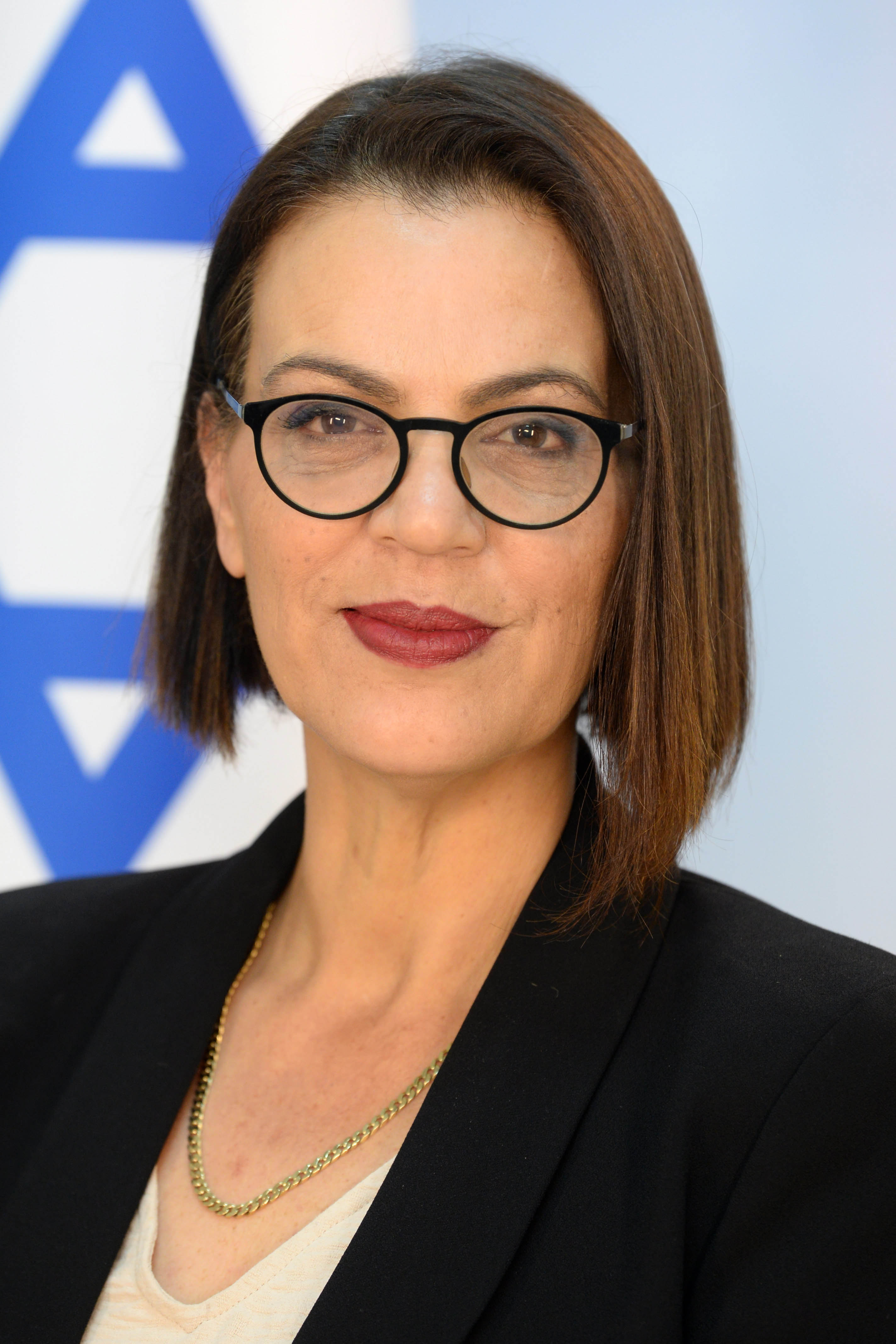
Galit Distel-Atbaryan

· Minister of Information
· Member of the Likud party

Date	Polling firm	Publisher	Approve	Disapprove	Undecided
23 Jun 23	Midgam R&C	HaHadashot 12	16	62	22
6 Apr 23	Midgam R&C	HaHadashot 12	17	63	20

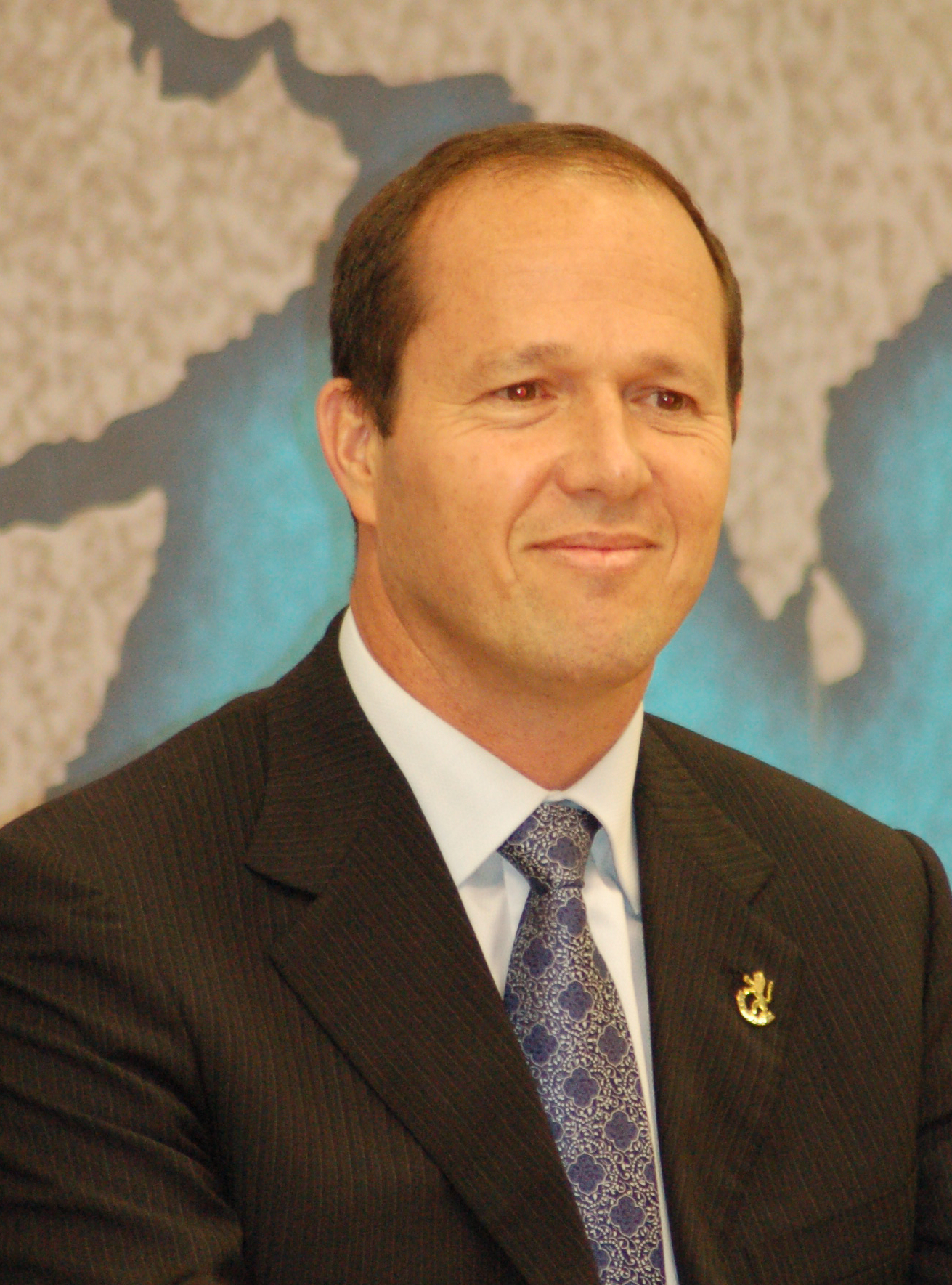
Nir Barkat

· Minister of Economy
· Member of the Likud party

Date	Polling firm	Publisher	Approve	Disapprove	Undecided
23 Jun 23	Midgam R&C	HaHadashot 12	32	53	15

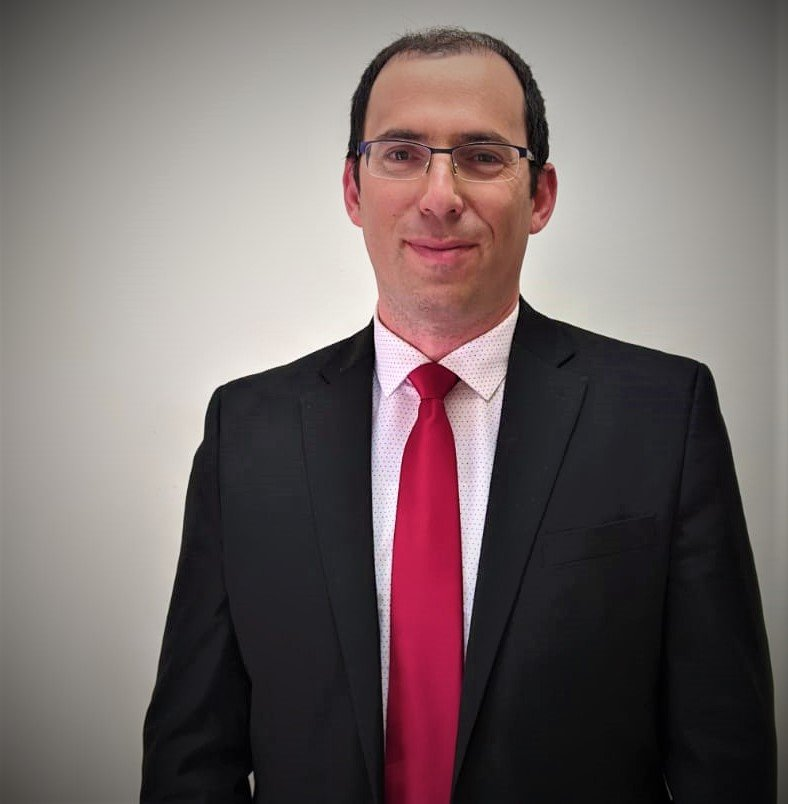
Simcha Rothman

· Chair of the Knesset Constitution, Law and Justice Committee
· Member of the Religious Zionist Party

Date	Polling firm	Publisher	Approve	Disapprove	Undecided
21 Mar 23	SF+DP	Channel 14	35	60	–

=== Opposition party figures ===
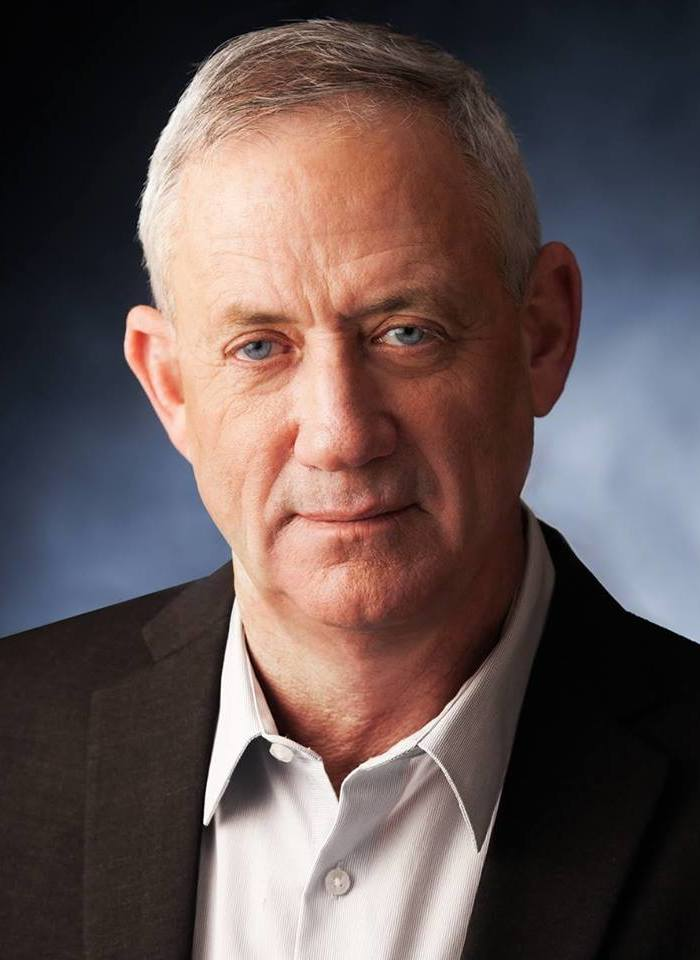
Benny Gantz
· Leader of the National Unity alliance
· Former Alternate Prime minister
· Former Speaker of the Knesset

Date	Polling firm	Publisher	Approve	Disapprove	Undecided
30 Jul 23	Maagar Mochot	Israel Hayom	40	37	23
6 Apr 23	Midgam R&C	HaHadashot 12	54	37	9

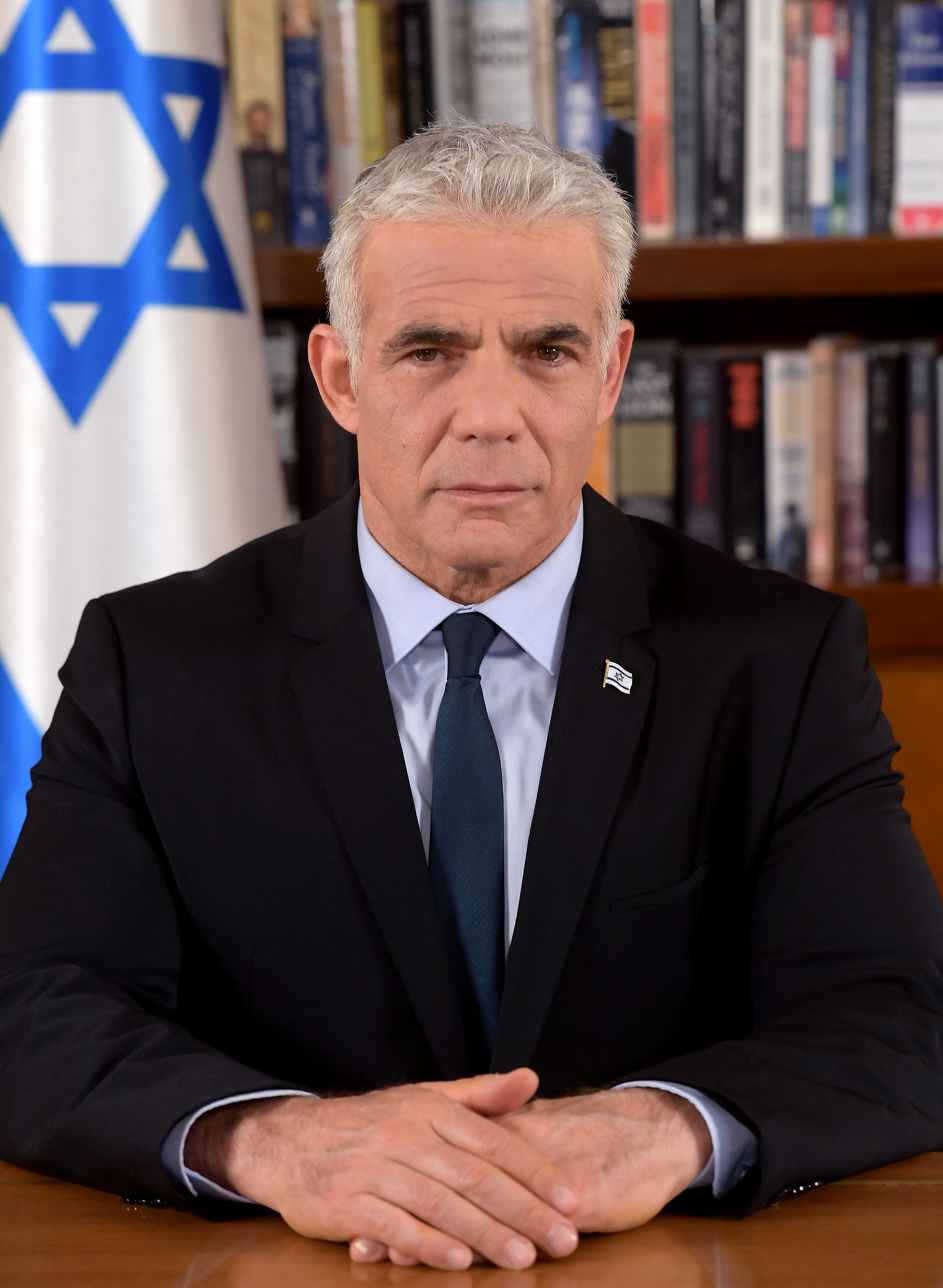
Yair Lapid
· Leader of the Opposition
· Leader of the Yesh Atid party
· Former Prime minister

Date	Polling firm	Publisher	Approve	Disapprove	Undecided
30 Jul 23	Maagar Mochot	Israel Hayom	25	52	23
6 Apr 23	Midgam R&C	HaHadashot 12	37	57	6
20 Jan 23	Midgam R&C	HaHadashot 12	30	59	11

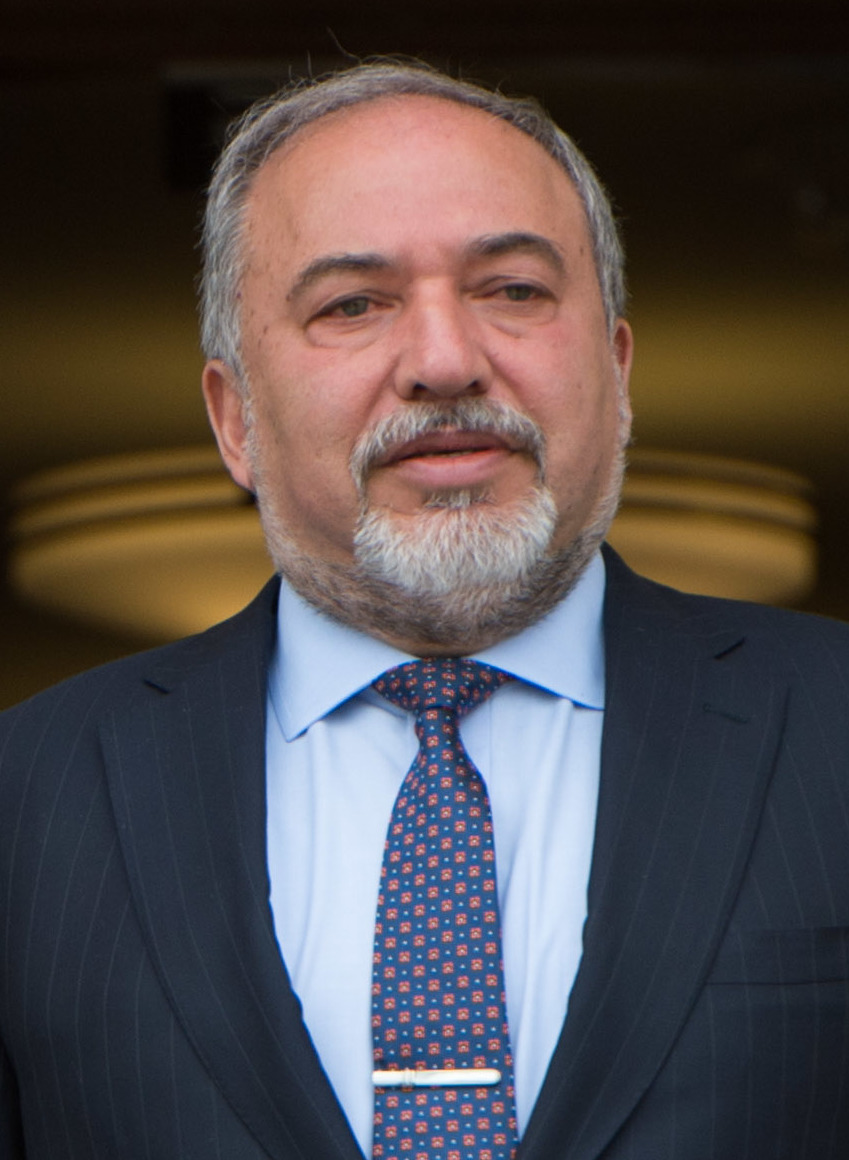
Avigdor Lieberman
· Leader of the Yisrael Beiteinu party

Date	Polling firm	Publisher	Approve	Disapprove	Undecided
6 Apr 23	Midgam R&C	HaHadashot 12	29	60	11

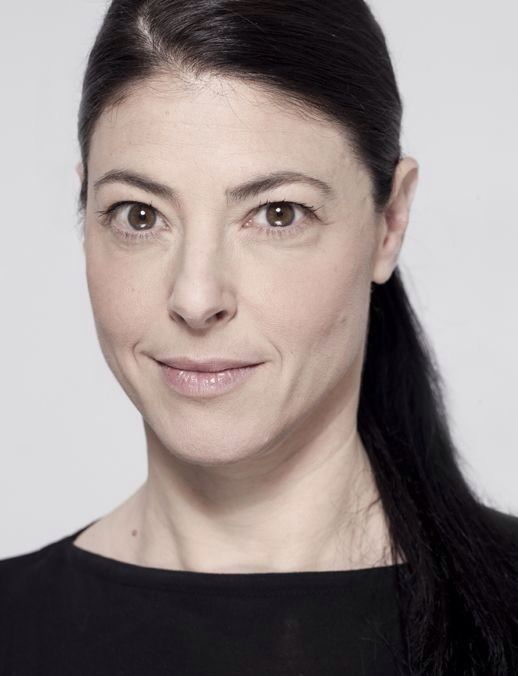
Merav Michaeli
· Leader of the Labor party until 2024

Date	Polling firm	Publisher	Approve	Disapprove	Undecided
6 Apr 23	Midgam R&C	HaHadashot 12	19	70	11
