= Channel 39 virtual TV stations in the United States =

The following television stations operate on virtual channel 39 in the United States:

- K14SC-D in Ashland, Oregon
- K14TF-D in Opelousas, Louisiana
- K18LR-D in Cottage Grove, Oregon
- K23OW-D in Hot Springs, Arkansas
- K24NI-D in Yuma, Arizona
- K25QS-D in Cortez, Colorado
- K27OO-D in Ellensburg, Washington
- K32CC-D in Montgomery Ranch, etc., Oregon
- K34ND-D in Moses Lake, Washington
- K35OT-D in International Falls, Minnesota
- K39EO-D in Crescent City, California
- K39JC-D in Butte, Montana
- KABE-CD in Bakersfield, California
- KBLR in Paradise, Nevada
- KBNK-LD in Fresno, California
- KETF-CD in Laredo, Texas
- KFPX-TV in Newton, Iowa
- KFXO-CD in Bend, Oregon
- KGKC-LD in Lawrence, Kansas
- KHGS-LD in Glenwood Springs, Colorado
- KHIZ-LD in Los Angeles, California
- KIAH in Houston, Texas
- KJDN-LD in Logan, Utah
- KJNB-LD in Jonesboro, Arkansas
- KJNE-LD in Jonesboro, Arkansas
- KKJB in Boise, Idaho
- KMCT-TV in West Monroe, Louisiana
- KMMD-CD in Salinas, California
- KNSD in San Diego, California
- KRTN-LD in Albuquerque, New Mexico
- KTAZ in Phoenix, Arizona
- KWCZ-LD in Sunnyside-Grandview, Washington
- KXTX-TV in Dallas, Texas
- KZLL-LD in Joplin, Missouri
- W27DG-D in Millersburg, Ohio
- W27EL-D in Champaign, Illinois
- W30EE-D in Jacksonville, Florida
- W39CA-D in Fulton, Mississippi
- WBXH-CD in Baton Rouge, Louisiana
- WBYD-CD in Pittsburgh, Pennsylvania
- WCZU-LD in Bowling Green, Kentucky
- WEMT in Greeneville, Tennessee
- WETU-LD in Montgomery, Alabama
- WFWA in Fort Wayne, Indiana
- WGCT-CD in Columbus, Ohio
- WHTN in Murfreesboro, Tennessee
- WIVM-LD in Canton, Ohio
- WJKP-LD in Corning, New York
- WLVT-TV in Allentown, Pennsylvania
- WMJF-CD in Towson, Maryland
- WNBJ-LD in Jackson, Tennessee
- WNYN-LD in New York, New York
- WOCB-CD in Marion, Ohio
- WQIZ-LD in Ashland, Ohio
- WQRF-TV in Rockford, Illinois
- WSFL-TV in Miami, Florida
- WSNN-LD in Sarasota, Florida
- WUNJ-TV in Wilmington, North Carolina
- WXCB-CD in Delaware, Ohio
- WYHB-CD in Chattanooga, Tennessee
- WYNB-LD in Ellenville, New York
- WZDT-LD in Naples, Florida

The following television stations, which are no longer licensed, formerly operated on virtual channel 39 in the United States:

- K31PF-D in Weed, California
- K34QA-D in Klamath Falls, Oregon
- K39IU-D in Springfield, Missouri
- K39JS-D in Salt Lake City, Utah
- W39CY-D in Myrtle Beach, South Carolina
- W39DE-D in Cayey, Puerto Rico
- WDTB-LD in Hamburg, New York
- WUDM-LD in Wolcott, Indiana
