= Channel 16 =

Channel 16 may refer to:

- Channel 16 (Bangladeshi TV channel), a defunct music entertainment television channel in Bangladesh
- Channel 16 (Israel), an Israeli television channel
- Channel 16 VHF, a radio frequency on the marine VHF radio band
- CCTV-16, a Chinese television channel

== Canada ==
The following television stations broadcast on digital or analog channel 16 (UHF frequencies covering 482-488 MHz) in Canada:

- CHBC-TV-5 in Enderby, British Columbia
- CHWI-DT in Windsor, Ontario

The following television stations operate on virtual channel 16 in Canada:

- CFKM-DT in Trois-Rivières, Quebec
- CHWI-DT in Windsor, Ontario

== Mexico ==
The following stations broadcast on virtual channel 16 in Mexico:

- Sistema Michoacano de Radio y Televisión in the state of Michoacán
- SET Televisión in the state of Puebla
- XETV-TDT (Nu9ve subchannel) in Tijuana, Baja California

== See also ==
- Channel 16 TV stations in Mexico
- Channel 16 branded TV stations in the United States
- Channel 16 digital TV stations in the United States
- Channel 16 low-power TV stations in the United States
- Channel 16 virtual TV stations in the United States
