= WEPA =

WEPA or Wepa may refer to:

- WEPA (AM), a defunct radio station in Eupora, Mississippi, U.S.
- WEPA-LD, a Channel 19 low-power television station licensed to serve Erie, Pennsylvania, U.S.
- WEPA-CD, a Channel 16 low-power television station licensed to serve Pittsburgh, Pennsylvania, U.S.
- "Wepa", a 2011 song by Gloria Estefan
- Wepa (company), a German producer of sanitary paper
- World Elephant Polo Association, the international governing body for elephant polo
