= WPBY =

WPBY may refer to:

- WPBY-LD, a low-power television station (channel 35) licensed to serve Lafayette, Indiana, United States
- WECY-LD, a low-power television station (channel 19, virtual 48) licensed to serve Elmira, New York, United States, which held the call sign WPBY-LD from 2015 to 2018
- WVPB-TV, a television station (channel 9, virtual 33) licensed to serve Huntington, West Virginia, United States, which held the call sign WPBY-TV from 1981 to 2015
