= WSHP =

WSHP may refer to:

- WSHP-FM, a radio station (103.9 FM) licensed to serve Easley, South Carolina, United States
- WSHP-LP, a defunct low-power radio station (103.3 FM) formerly licensed to serve Cary, North Carolina, United States
- WYCM, a radio station (95.7 FM) licensed to serve Lafayette, Indiana, United States, which held the call sign WSHP from 2005 to 2014
- WBPE (FM), a radio station (95.3 FM) licensed to serve Brookston, Indiana, which held the call sign WSHP from 2004 to 2005
- WRDD, a radio station (1480 AM) licensed to serve Shippensburg, Pennsylvania, United States, which held the call sign WSHP from 1961 to 2005
