= NBC 39 =

NBC 39 may refer to:

- KNSD in San Diego, California (O&O)
- WNBJ-LD in Jackson, Tennessee
- WRAL-EX in Raleigh, North Carolina (ATSC 3.0 simulcast)
