= ABC 16 =

ABC 16 may refer to:

== Current ==
- KKTQ-LD in Cheyenne, Wyoming
  - Semi-satellite of KTWO-TV in Casper, Wyoming
- WAPT in Jackson, Mississippi
- WGXA-DT2 in Macon, Georgia (branded as WGXA ABC 16; broadcasts on channel 24.2)
- WNEP-TV in Scranton, Pennsylvania
- WPBI-LD3 in Lafayette, Indiana
- WVAW-LD in Charlottesville, Virginia

== Former ==
- WENS (TV) in Pittsburgh, Pennsylvania (1953–1957)
- WNET (Rhode Island) in Providence, Rhode Island (1954–1955)
- WTAC-TV in Flint, Michigan (1953–1954)
