= Universal Licensing System =

US online portal for wireless licensing

In the United States, the Universal Licensing System (ULS) is the FCC online search portal for wireless licensing and research. It mainly supports online licensing and public access to its database. The FCC is an independent agency of the U.S. government appointed with the duty of allocating permission to businesses and individuals, the domestic (non-federal) use of wireless technologies.

Since mid-2018, the FCC stated that ULS:

...simplifies the application and licensing processes and provides secure, world-wide access through the Internet. This results in reduced filing time and financial savings for both customers and the federal government. More than an electronic filing system, ULS is a powerful information tool that enables you to research applications, licenses, and antenna structures. It also keeps you informed with weekly public notices, FCC rulemakings, processing utilities, a telecommunications glossary, and much more. Plus ULS features a Geographic Information System (GIS), a digital mapping technology that identifies spectrum use in relation to geographical areas.

== See also ==
- Frequency allocation
- National Telecommunications and Information Administration
- Spectrum management
- Wireless microphone licensing
