= Fox 42 =

Fox 42 may refer to one of the following television stations in the United States, affiliated with the Fox Broadcasting Company:

== Current ==
- KJNE-LD in Jonesboro, Arkansas
  - Local translator for KJNB-LD
- KPTM in Omaha, Nebraska

== Former ==
- KBVO-TV (now KEYE-TV) in Austin, Texas (1986–1995)
