= KTBY =

Television station in Anchorage, Alaska

- Anchorage, Alaska; United States
- Channels: Digital: 20 (UHF); Virtual: 4
- Branding: Fox 4; Your Alaska Link (newscasts)

Programming
- Affiliations: 4.1: Fox; for others, see § Subchannels

Ownership
- Owner: Coastal Television Broadcasting Company LLC; (KTBY License LLC)
- Sister stations: KATN, KJUD, KYUR

History
- First air date: December 2, 1983
- Former channel numbers: Analog: 4 (VHF, 1983–2009)
- Former affiliations: Independent (1983–1986)

Technical information
- Licensing authority: FCC
- Facility ID: 35655
- ERP: 234.4 kW
- HAAT: 45 m (148 ft)
- Transmitter coordinates: 61°13′9″N 149°53′32″W
- Translator(s): see § Translators

Links
- Public license information: Public file; LMS
- Website: youralaskalink.com

KTBY (channel 4) is a television station in Anchorage, Alaska, United States, affiliated with the Fox network. The station is owned by Coastal Television Broadcasting Company LLC and operated alongside dual ABC/CW+ affiliate KYUR (channel 13). The two stations share studios on East Tudor Road in Anchorage; KTBY's transmitter is located in historic downtown Anchorage atop the Hilton Anchorage East Tower hotel.

Some of KTBY's programming is broadcast to rural communities via low-power translators through the Alaska Rural Communications Service (ARCS).

== History ==
Totem Broadcasting was incorporated on January 11, 1980. Within weeks, Tacoma mayor Mike Parker received a call from Totem for the potential of exploiting an unassigned frequency in Anchorage, in a state with several unassigned slots. Parker was consulting with an unnamed group for a VHF station on channel 4. In November, Totem announced that it was going to set up a "family-friendly" television station, with a mix of religious, current affairs and entertainment programming, due to the growth of content with sex and violence available on the market. By this time, Anchorage had grown enough to support an independent station alongside the city's three network affiliates. The estimated cost of building the station was of $1.5 million.

KTBY signed on the air on December 2, 1983, with Mike Parker as president, Mike Buck as general manager and Dave Peters II as program director before joining the new Fox network on its launch of October 9, 1986 (being part of a small number of TV stations on the VHF dial not owned by the network to be affiliated with Fox upon its startup), an affiliation which continues today. It was the only Fox station in Alaska until 1992, when KFXF in Fairbanks went on the air; in the late 1980s, it also became the first station in Alaska to broadcast 24 hours a day.

During the 1980s, KTBY was the first Anchorage station to air professional wrestling with any regularity, largely in response to the increase in mainstream interest. Televised wrestling programs were largely absent from Anchorage television, as the programs were traditionally used to promote live events, which have been held only occasionally in Alaska dating back to the 1950s. The station originally aired AWA All-Star Wrestling (in conjunction with a short-lived attempt on their part to promote events in the market), and later World Class Championship Wrestling and WWF Superstars of Wrestling.

On August 29, 2007, Cumming, Georgia–based Coastal Television Broadcasting Company LLC (led by Bill Fielder) announced its intent to acquire KTBY from Piedmont Television Holdings for $3,242,500. The sale was completed on May 7, 2008.

In June 2010, Coastal Television hired Scott Centers as general manager to manage KTBY and under a shared services agreement, manage Vision Alaska I and Vision Alaska II. This created one of the few instances where a Fox affiliate is the nominal senior partner in an LMA/SSA involving a "Big Three" affiliate. In September 2010, KTBY relocated its master control operations to colocate with Vision Alaska I.

On January 28, 2013, Coastal was notified by the FCC that it had failed to update ownership information for KTBY's antenna structure. The company was fined $4,200 and the information was subsequently updated as a result.

== News operation ==
Until October 1, 2008, KTBY aired a 9 p.m. weeknight newscast produced by then-CBS affiliate KTVA (channel 11). This production ceased when KTBY began its own news operation.

In April 2020, as a result of impending economic concerns caused by the COVID-19 pandemic, KTBY and KYUR announced plans to outsource its news production to the national NewsNet service, which began operations one year earlier. All of the stations' newscasts outside of prime time, including Good Day Alaska, were canceled, and the majority of the local staff were laid off. By the end of the month, KYUR's news output had been reduced to a 30-minute newscast at 10 p.m. and KTBY was reduced to an hour-long newscast at 9 p.m. Both of these newscasts were branded as NewsNet Alaska, featuring a brief local news segment produced in Anchorage, with the rest of the broadcast utilizing the NewsNet national feed produced out of Cadillac, Michigan. Despite the reduction in local news, KTBY and KYUR opted to use the NewsNet national branding "More News. More Often." in their broadcasts. In 2022, the stations outsourced their news programming to News Hub, which had recently been acquired by Coastal Television, as Your Alaska Link News.

== Technical information ==
=== Subchannels ===
The station's signal is multiplexed:

Subchannels of KTBY
Subchannel	Res.	Short name	Programming
4.1	720p	KTBY-HD	Fox
4.2	480i	DABL	Dabl
4.3	480i	COZI	Cozi TV
4.4	480i	DEFY	Ion Plus
4.5	480i	TruReal	Ion

=== Analog-to-digital conversion ===
KTBY shut down its analog signal, over VHF channel 4, on June 12, 2009, the official date on which full-power television stations in the United States transitioned from analog to digital broadcasts under federal mandate. The station's digital signal remained on its pre-transition UHF channel 20, using virtual channel 4.

=== Translators ===
- K04JH-D Homer
- K08KA-D Girdwood
- K09QH-D Kenai, etc.
- K31MD-D Ninilchik
- K33AF-D Kasilof
