= CBS 42 =

CBS 42 may refer to any of the following CBS affiliates:

== Currently affiliated ==
- KESQ-DT2, a digital channel of KESQ-TV in Palm Springs, California
  - Local simulcast of KPSP-CD in Cathedral City, California
- KEYE-TV in Austin, Texas
- KJNE-LD2, a digital subchannel of KJNE-LD in Jonesboro, Arkansas
  - K22PF-D in Jonesboro, Arkansas, an in-market translator of that station

== Formerly affiliated ==
- WIAT in Birmingham, Alabama (non-primary, 1965–1970; primary, 1970–2026)
