= Coastal Television Broadcasting Company =

American media company

Coastal Television Broadcasting Group LLC
- Type: Private
- Industry: Television stations; Radio stations; Digital marketing
- Founded: 2007; 19 years ago
- Founder: Bill Fielder
- Headquarters: Cumming, Georgia (Note: Most sources say the company based in Cumming, Georgia, while others say Anchorage, Alaska.), United States
- Area served: United States (nationwide)
- Key people: Bill Fielder (CEO); Don Fisher (President)
- Services: Television broadcasting; Radio broadcasting; Digital marketing
- Owner: Bill Fielder
- Website: coastaltvgroup.com

Coastal Television Broadcasting Group LLC (also known simply as Coastal Television) is an American television broadcasting, radio broadcasting and digital marketing company based in Cumming, Georgia. It was founded in 2007 by Bill Fielder. The company owns and/or operates television stations in thirteen markets in nine states; from as large as Tupelo, Mississippi, to as small as the fourth-smallest media market, Juneau, Alaska. It also operates stations owned by Vision Alaska and Big Horn Television, both also based in Cumming.

== History ==
=== Beginnings and starting presence in Alaska (2007–2014) ===
Coastal Television Broadcasting Group LLC was founded as in 2007 by Bill Fielder in Cumming, Georgia. On August 29, 2007, Coastal announced that it intended to acquire KTBY in Anchorage, Alaska for $3,242,500. The sale was completed on May 7, 2008.

In 2010, Vision Alaska LLC acquired all three of Alaska's ABC affiliates: KYUR in Anchorage, KATN in Fairbanks, and KJUD in Juneau for $5.75 million. The sale was completed on May 13, 2010 and soon after, Coastal agreed to operate KYUR under a shared services agreement and joint sales agreement, and KATN and KJUD under time brokerage agreements.

In October 2013, however, Coastal was fined $4,200 by the Federal Communications Commission (FCC) for failing to update ownership information about KTBY's antenna structure; which was eventually updated.

=== Expansion to the Continental U.S. and growth (2014–present) ===
On October 7, 2014, Coastal announced its intent to acquire WLOV-TV in Tupelo, Mississippi for an undisclosed price with hopes for the deal to be approved by the FCC in early 2015. This was concurrent with the sale of WTVA from the Spain Family to Atlanta, Georgia—based Heartland Media. WTVA had been in local marketing agreements with WLOV-TV since 1992. The sales were completed on February 11, 2015 and the local marketing agreement was preserved; allowing Coastal to expand outside of Alaska and into the Continental U.S.. Allen Media Broadcasting later acquired 11 Heartland stations, including WTVA, in 2020; and renewed the LMA with WLOV-TV.

On October 8, 2019, Coastal announced its intent to acquire Casper, Wyoming station KFNB (as well as its satellites in Rawlins and Riverton) in addition to Cheyenne, Wyoming station KLWY from Wyomedia Corporation. This was concurrent with the purchase of KTWO-TV and KKTQ-LD by Vision Wyoming, LLC (a subsidiary of Vision Alaska) from Silverton Broadcasting; and the purchase of KGWC-TV (as well as its satellites in Lander and Rock Springs) by newly-founded Big Horn Television (led by Michael Hogan) from Mark III Media. The sale was completed on June 1, 2020 for an undisclosed price.

Throughout 2020, Coastal began cutting local newscasts and staff from its Alaska and Wyoming stations and replacing them with anchors and content from NewsNet, based in Michigan. Coastal later stated that this was due to the economic effects of the COVID-19 pandemic.

In July 2021, Coastal announced that it would acquire nine television stations from Waypoint Media for $48.9 million. Coastal would also acquire six Lafayette, Indiana TV and radio stations from Star City Broadcasting as part of the deal. The sale were completed on January 4, 2022; giving Coastal television stations in eleven markets in seven states; and radio stations in one market in one state.

In addition to the large amount of television and radio stations acquired from Waypoint, Coastal also acquired News Hub (based in Little Rock, Arkansas) and the NuLogic digital marketing agency.

In December 2023, Coastal announced that it had reached an agreement to acquire the stations owned by Red River Broadcasting for $18.1 million. This includes KVRR and its satellite stations, and KQDS-TV. The sale was completed on April 5, 2024.

== Assets ==
=== Television stations ===
Stations are arranged alphabetically by state and city of license.

City of license / Market	Station	Channel; TV (RF)	Owned; since	Affiliation
Anchorage, Alaska	KTBY	4 (20)	2008 (Note: Acquired from Piedmont Television.)	Fox
Anchorage, Alaska	KYUR	13 (12)	2010 (Note: Acquired from Smith Media.) (Note: Owned by Vision Alaska, LLC.)	ABC; The CW (DT2); Fox (DT3)
Fairbanks, Alaska	KATN	2 (18)	2010	ABC; Fox (DT2); The CW (DT3)
Juneau, Alaska	KJUD	8 (11)	2010	ABC; The CW (DT2); Fox (DT3)
Jonesboro, Arkansas	KJNB-CD	39 (16)	2022 (Note: Acquired from Waypoint Media.)	Fox; CBS (LD2); MeTV/MyNetworkTV (LD3)
Jonesboro, Arkansas	K22PF-D (Note: Translator of KJNB-LD.)	42 (22)	2022	Fox; CBS (LD2); MeTV/MyNetworkTV (LD3)
Lafayette, Indiana	WPBI-CD	16 (17)	2022	Fox; NBC (LD2); ABC (LD3)
Lafayette, Indiana	WPBY-CD	35 (35)	2022	ABC; MeTV/MyNetworkTV (LD2)
Duluth, Minnesota	KQDS-TV	21 (18)	2024 (Note: Acquired from Red River Broadcasting.)	Fox
Thief River Falls, Minnesota (part of the Grand Forks, North Dakota market)	KBRR (Note: Satellite of KVRR.)	10 (10)	2024	Fox
Meridian, Mississippi	WGBC	30 (31)	2022	Fox; NBC (DT2)
Meridian, Mississippi	WMDN	24 (24)	2022 (Note: Acquired from Wade Threadgill.) (Note: Owned by Big Horn Television, LLC.)	CBS; MeTV (DT3)
Tupelo, Mississippi	WLOV-TV	27 (16)	2015 (Note: Acquired from Tupelo Broadcasting.) (Note: Operated by Morris Multimedia.)	The CW; MeTV (DT2)
Elmira, New York	WYDC	48 (30)	2022	Fox; MyNetworkTV (DT2); MeTV (DT3)
Elmira, New York	WJKP-LD	39 (14)	2022	MyNetworkTV
Elmira, New York	WECY-LD (Note: Translator of WYDC.)	48 (19)	2022	Fox; MyNetworkTV (LD2); MeTV (LD3)
Fargo, North Dakota	KVRR	15 (19)	2024	Fox
Jamestown, North Dakota	KJRR	7 (7)	2024	Fox
Pembina, North Dakota (serving the southern Manitoba market including Winnipeg)	KNRR	12 (12)	2024	Fox
Jackson, Tennessee	WNBJ-LD	39 (16)	2022	NBC; The CW (LD2); Heroes & Icons/MyNetworkTV (LD3)
Casper, Wyoming	KFNB	20 (20)	2020 (Note: Acquired from Wyomedia Corporation.)	Fox; MyNetworkTV/MeTV (DT2)
Casper, Wyoming	K27PT-D (Note: Translator of KFNB.)	20 (27)	2020	Fox; MyNetworkTV/MeTV (DT2)
Casper, Wyoming	KTWO-TV	2 (17)	2020 (Note: Acquired from Silverton Broadcasting.)	ABC
Casper, Wyoming	KGWC-TV	14 (14)	2020 (Note: Acquired from Mark III Media.)	CBS; ABC (DT2)
Cheyenne, Wyoming	KLWY (Note: Semi-satellite of KFNB.)	27 (27)	2020	Fox; ABC (DT2); MyNetworkTV/MeTV (DT3); Ion Television (DT4)
Cheyenne, Wyoming	KKTQ-LD (Note: Semi-satellite of KTWO-TV.)	16 (16)	2020	ABC; MeTV (LD2)
Lander, Wyoming (part of the Casper, Wyoming market)	KGWL-TV (Note: Satellite of KGWC-TV.)	5 (7)	2020	CBS; ABC (DT2)
Rawlins, Wyoming (part of the Denver, Colorado market)	KFNR (Note: Satellite of KFNB.)	11 (9)	2020	Fox; ABC (DT2)
Riverton, Wyoming (part of the Casper, Wyoming market)	KFNE	10 (10)	2020	Fox; ABC (DT2)
Rock Springs, Wyoming (part of the Salt Lake City, Utah market)	KGWR-TV	13 (13)	2020	CBS; ABC (DT2)

=== Radio stations ===
AM Station	FM Station

City of license / Market	Station	Owned since	Current format
Lafayette, Indiana	WSHY 1410 (Note: Utilizes an FM translator, W282CJ, on 104.3 MHz in Lafayette, Indiana.)	2022	Talk radio
Lafayette, Indiana	WBPE 95.3	2022	Adult hits
Lafayette, Indiana	WYCM 95.7	2022	Country music
Lafayette, Indiana	WAZY-FM 96.5 (Note: Utilizes an FM translator, W222AS, on 92.3 MHz in West Lafayette, Indiana.)	2022	Contemporary hit radio

=== Other assets ===
- News Hub
- NuLogic
