= CW 39 =

CW 39 may refer to the following television stations in the U.S. affiliated with The CW:

== Current ==
- KIAH in Houston, Texas (O&O)
- WNBJ-LD2 in Jackson, Tennessee

== Former ==
- WCVI-TV in Christiansted, U.S. Virgin Islands (2006–2009)
- WSFL-TV in Miami, Florida (2006–2024)
