= News Hub =

Production company

- Formerly: Independent News Network
- Type: Division
- Industry: Media
- Founded: 1999
- Headquarters: Little Rock, AR, US
- Key people: Elden A. Hale Jr.; (corporate director of news)
- Brands: Hispanic News Network
- Services: newscasts
- Owner: Coastal Television Broadcasting Company
- Website: coastaltvgroup.com

Today News HUB (formerly known as Independent News Network) is a production company based in Little Rock, Arkansas, which syndicates "localized" news programs for broadcast television stations in the United States, that have budgets limiting their ability to produce their own local newscasts.

In addition to producing local newscasts, INN also produced a Spanish language Hispanic News Network, or HNN and (prior to September 2019) INN News for national syndication.

== History ==
=== Regional News Network ===
The Regional News Network started in 1999 and branded itself as Independent News Network. The company's first client was Davenport Fox affiliate KLJB (channel 18). INN produced a half-hour primetime newscast for that station, titled the Fox 18 Nine O'Clock News, which started on December 31 1999 until the station entered into a news share agreement with crosstown ABC affiliate WQAD-TV in September 2010.

The company started two syndicated general national news products in June 2002. "The American Times" and "INN News" were for stations and cable channels who did not want a customized news product. In October, a Montana regional newscast, Big Sky News, with some localization for five stations began.

INN began expanding into Spanish language newscast with Univision affiliates, particularly those owned by Equity Media Holdings. The Salt Lake City affiliate, KUTH, became INN's first Spanish client in February 2003. INN started Noticias Arkansas, a regional and local Spanish newscast, in June 2004 for affiliates in Little Rock and North West Arkansas.

In August 2008, INN launched Hispanic News Network (HNN) in 20 markets. At that time INN employed six on-air personnel, with the expectation of hiring 6 more by early 2009. A new studio was constructed for HNN as part of the operation taking on a major market INN-produced newscast for Detroit's WMYD, then owned by Granite Broadcasting.

=== Latin Media Group ===
Regional News Network filed for Chapter 7 bankruptcy on December 31, 2008. INN was taken over in early January 2009 by LMG, Inc., part of Fusion Communications, also of Davenport, Iowa. In the transfer, INN laid off 12 of its staff of 40, and kept its client stations except for WPGA-TV in Macon, Georgia.

By November 2009, Independent News Network signed on WeatherNation for five of INN's Spanish language client stations. INN agreed by October 2011 to support Soul of the South Network's planned five hours of news per day. INN's staff was further cut to 14 in June 2013 as more client stations left the service.

=== Media Gateway division ===
By June 2015, SSN Media Gateway, LLC had acquired Independent News Network. At that time Media Gateway hired Anne Imanuel who remains one of the company’s primary anchors.

Sarah Blakely was hired by May 2017 as anchor for the Lafayette, Indiana Star City News.

=== News Hub ===
Waypoint Media purchased Independent News Network from Media Gateway in early June 2019 and renamed it to News Hub. As corporate director of news, Elden A. Hale Jr. was then appointed to head the division. The national version of the newscast was dropped at the same time. After a planned sale to Standard Media Group collapsed, Waypoint announced the sale of the hub to Coastal Television Broadcasting Company in July 2021.

Waypoint's WHPM-LD in Hattiesburg–Laurel, Mississippi retained its affiliation with News Hub after the hub's sale to Coastal.

Coastal's KQDS-TV in Duluth, Minnesota and KVRR in Fargo, North Dakota (including KVRR's satellites, KBRR, KJRR and KNRR) do not utilize News Hub, retaining their locally-based news operations started by their former owners, Red River Broadcasting. Coastal's WLOV-TV in West Point, Mississippi, serving Columbus, Tupelo and Starkville, operated by Morris Multimedia, also does not utilize News Hub, instead airing newscasts produced by Morris Multimedia's Columbus-licensed WCBI-TV. Coastal's WJKP-LD in Corning, New York does not carry any newscasts.

== Hispanic News Network ==
Hispanic News Network (HNN) was launched by INN in 20 markets in August 2008. Alan Rivera was promoted to executive producer for HNN and newscaster after already working at INN for 4 years. At launch, HNN produced three newscasts a day. At that time INN employed six on-air personnel with expectation of hiring 6 more by early 2009.

== Stations with News Hub/INN newscasts ==
=== English ===
==== Current ====
City of license	Station	Affiliation	Owner	Newscasts produced	Start
Anchorage, AK	KYUR	ABC	Vision Alaska; operated by Coastal Television Broadcasting Company	5 p.m. and 10 p.m. weekdays	2022
Anchorage, AK	KTBY	Fox	Coastal Television Broadcasting Company	9 p.m. weekdays	2022
Fairbanks, AK	KATN	ABC/Fox	Vision Alaska; operated by Coastal Television Broadcasting Company	5 p.m., 9 p.m. and 10 p.m. weekdays	2022
Juneau, AK	KJUD	ABC/CW/Fox	Vision Alaska; operated by Coastal Television Broadcasting Company	5 p.m., 9 p.m. and 10 p.m. weekdays	
Jonesboro, AR	KJNB-LD/KJNE-LD	Fox/CBS	Coastal Television Broadcasting Company	6 p.m., 9 p.m. and 10 p.m. weekdays	2017
Lafayette, IN	WPBI-LD	Fox/NBC	Coastal Television Broadcasting Company	6 p.m. (NBC), 10 p.m. (Fox) and 11 p.m. (NBC) weekdays	May 29, 2017
Lafayette, IN	WPBY-LD	ABC	Coastal Television Broadcasting Company	7 p.m. (ABC) and 11 p.m. (WPBI-LD) weekdays	May 29, 2017
Hattiesburg–Laurel, MS	WHPM-LD	Fox	Waypoint Media	9 p.m. weekdays	2017
Meridian, MS	WMDN	CBS	Big Horn Television; operated by Coastal Television Broadcasting Company	6 p.m., 9 p.m. and 10 p.m. weekdays	2017
Meridian, MS	WGBC	Fox/NBC	Coastal Television Broadcasting Company	6 p.m., 9 p.m. and 10 p.m. weekdays	2017
Corning–Elmira, NY	WYDC	Fox	Coastal Television Broadcasting Company	10 p.m. weekdays	2017
Jackson, TN	WNBJ-LD	NBC/CW	Coastal Television Holdings	6 p.m., 9 p.m. and 10 p.m. weekdays	2017
Casper, WY	KTWO-TV	ABC	Vision Alaska Television Holdings; operated by Coastal Television Broadcasting Company	Good Morning Wyoming, 12 p.m., 5 p.m. and 10 p.m. weekdays 5 p.m. and 10 p.m. weekends	2022
Casper, WY	KFNB/KFNE/KFNR/KWYF-LD	Fox	Coastal Television Broadcasting Company	7 a.m. and 9 p.m. weekdays	2022
Casper, WY	KGWC-TV/KGWL/KGWR	CBS	Big Horn Television; operated by Coastal Television Broadcasting Company	10 p.m. weekdays (KTWO)	2022
Cheyenne, WY	KKTQ-LD	ABC	Vision Alaska Television Holdings; operated by Coastal Television Broadcasting Company	Good Morning Wyoming, 12 p.m., 5 p.m. and 10 p.m. weekdays (KTWO); 5 p.m. and 10 p.m. weekends (KTWO)	2022
Cheyenne, WY	KLWY	Fox	Coastal Television	7 a.m. and 9 p.m. weekdays (KFNB)	2022

==== Former ====
City of license	Station	Affiliation	Newscasts produced	Start	End
Nationwide	Youtoo America	Youtoo America	INN News (7 p.m. ET weekdays)	Unknown	September 2019
Montgomery, AL	WNCF	ABC	One	August 2005	February 1, 2013
Gainesville, FL	WGFL	CBS	5:30 p.m. and 11 p.m. weekdays	October 27, 2010	April 2016
Gainesville, FL	WNBW-DT	NBC	6 p.m. and 11 p.m. weekdays	October 27, 2010	April 2016
Gainesville, FL	WMYG-LP	MyNetworkTV	7 p.m. and 10 p.m. weekdays	October 27, 2010	April 2016
Columbus, GA	WLTZ	NBC	Three	December 2007	July 2014
Macon, GA	WPGA-TV	Independent	7 p.m. weekdays	July 2007	January 4, 2009
Davenport, IA	KLJB	Fox	9 p.m. weekdays	December 31, 1999	September 6, 2010
Louisville, KY	WJYL-CD	TBN	One	Unknown	Unknown
Alexandria, LA	KLAX-TV	ABC	Two	February 2007	December 2018
Salisbury, MD	WRDE-LP	NBC		2014	May 31, 2019
Boston, MA	WBIN-TV	Independent	10 p.m. weekdays	September 2011	April 26, 2013
Detroit, MI	WMYD	MyNetworkTV	10 p.m. weekdays	2008	September 2009
Montana	Five stations	ABC	Big Sky News	October 2002	ca. 2004
Omaha, NE	KPTM	Fox	9 p.m. weekdays	September 6, 2010	2013
Reno, NV	KRXI-TV	Fox	11 p.m. weekdays	2011	2013
Salem, OR	KWVT-LD		4:30 p.m. weekdays	April 6, 2006	2009
Roanoke, VA	WZBJ	MyNetworkTV	Condensed weather report	Unknown	Unknown
Cheyenne, WY	KGWN-TV	CBS	One	ca. 2006	December 19, 2013

=== Spanish ===
City of license	Station	Affiliation
Atlanta, Georgia	WUVM-LD (channel 4)	Azteca América
Las Vegas	KMCC (channel 34)	VasalloVision
Las Vegas, Nevada	KHDF-CD (channel 19)	Azteca América
Austin, Texas	KADF-LD (channel 20)	Azteca América
Dallas, Texas	KAZD (channel 55)	Azteca América
Houston, Texas	KYAZ (channel 51)	Azteca América
San Antonio, Texas	KVDF-CD (channel 31)	Azteca América

INN produces several Spanish language newscasts (primarily for Azteca América owned-and-operated stations run by Una Vez Más Holdings, LLC), and provides content for HNN (Hispanic News Network). INN also produces a daily national program for the HITN network.

INN also previously produced a newscast for affiliates of LAT TV, a Houston, Texas-based Spanish language television network; LAT TV folded in May 2008. The company also produced newscasts for seven Univision-affiliated stations owned by the Equity Broadcasting Corporation: KUTH in Salt Lake City, KLRA-LP (now KKYK-CD) in Little Rock, KEYU in Amarillo, WUDT-CA in Detroit, WUMN-CA in Minneapolis, KUOK in Woodward (as well as its repeaters, KCHM-LP in Oklahoma City and KUTU-LP in Tulsa) and WUVF-CA in Naples. Equity discontinued these newscasts on June 6, 2008.

== See also ==
- News Central
- All News Channel
- Independent Network News
- NewsNet
- One America News Network
