= WLAS =

WLAS may refer to:

- WLAS-LP, a low-power radio station (102.9 FM) licensed to serve Auburndale, Massachusetts, United States
- WSHY, a radio station (1410 AM) licensed to Lafayette, Indiana, United States, which held the call sign WLAS from August 2002 to May 2007
