= Wazy =

Wazy may refer to

- Jan Kazimierz Wazy (1609–1672), Polish king
- WAZY-FM, US radio station
- Issia Wazy, Ivorian football club
