= Channel 16 low-power TV stations in the United States =

The following low-power television stations broadcast on digital or analog channel 16 in the United States:

- K16AB-D in Guymon, Oklahoma
- K16AE-D in Gillette, Wyoming
- K16AZ-D in Glasgow, Montana
- K16BO-D in Milford, etc., Utah
- K16BP-D in Cottonwood, Arizona
- K16BQ-D in Brainerd, Minnesota
- K16BT-D in Orderville, Utah
- K16BZ-D in Ruidoso, New Mexico
- K16CG-D in St. James, Minnesota
- K16CH-D in Raton, New Mexico
- K16CO-D in Alexandria, Minnesota
- K16CS-D in Pinedale, etc., Wyoming
- K16CT-D in Cortez, etc, Colorado
- K16DH-D in Miles City, Montana
- K16DL-D in Zuni Pueblo, New Mexico
- K16DR-D in Jack's Cabin, Colorado
- K16DS-D in St. George, Utah
- K16DX-D in Gage, Oklahoma
- K16DZ-D in Hardin, Montana
- K16EJ-D in Peetz, Colorado
- K16EK-D in Idalia, Colorado
- K16EM-D in Prineville, etc., Oregon
- K16ET-D in Pleasant Valley, Colorado
- K16EV-D in Bullhead City, Arizona
- K16EX-D in Clovis, New Mexico
- K16FC-D in San Luis Obispo, California
- K16FD-D in Battle Mountain, Nevada
- K16FS-D in Woody Creek, Colorado
- K16FU-D in Mina/Luning, Nevada
- K16FV-D in Ryndon, Nevada
- K16GJ-D in Polson, Montana
- K16GM-D in Yerington, Nevada
- K16GP-D in Circle, Montana
- K16GZ-D in Durango, Colorado
- K16HD-D in Green River, Utah
- K16HI-D in Navajo Mountain, Utah
- K16HJ-D in Oljeto, Utah
- K16HK-D in Mexican Hat, Utah
- K16HV-D in Mayfield, Utah
- K16HW-D in Evanston, etc., Wyoming
- K16IB-D in Mount Pleasant, Utah
- K16IC-D in Park Rapids, Minnesota
- K16IE-D in Coos Bay, Oregon
- K16II-D in Hilldale, Utah
- K16IO-D in Chugwater, Wyoming
- K16IR-D in Sayre, Oklahoma
- K16IS-D in Pittsburg, Kansas
- K16IW-D in Redding, California
- K16IX-D in Preston, Idaho
- K16IZ-D in Eureka, Nevada
- K16JD-D in Northome, Minnesota
- K16JE-D in Glenns Ferry, Idaho
- K16JJ-D in Eureka, California
- K16JS-D in Eugene, Oregon
- K16JW-D in Ridgecrest, California
- K16JZ-D in McDermitt, Nevada
- K16KA-D in Pueblo, Colorado
- K16KB-D in Conrad, Montana
- K16KE-D in Baudette, Minnesota
- K16KI-D in Bend, Oregon
- K16KM-D in Bemidji, Minnesota
- K16KO-D in Leadore, Idaho
- K16KZ-D in Quartz Creek, etc., Montana
- K16LB-D in Yucca Valley, California
- K16LF-D in Eads, etc., Colorado
- K16LG-D in Lund & Preston, Nevada
- K16LI-D in Port Orford, Oregon
- K16LL-D in Cottage Grove, Oregon
- K16LM-D in Teton Village, Wyoming
- K16LN-D in Pendleton, Oregon
- K16LP-D in Paradise, California
- K16LQ-D in Seiling, Oklahoma
- K16LR-D in Artesia, New Mexico
- K16LS-D in Grangeville, etc., Idaho
- K16LT-D in Dubois, etc., Wyoming
- K16LU-D in Caballo, New Mexico
- K16LV-D in Grays River, Washington
- K16LX-D in Juliaetta, Idaho
- K16LY-D in Childress, Texas
- K16LZ-D in Rural Garfield County, Utah
- K16MA-D in Frost, Minnesota
- K16MB-D in Hatch, Utah
- K16MC-D in Rural Sevier County, Utah
- K16MD-D in Teasdale/Torrey, Utah
- K16ME-D in Richfield, etc., Utah
- K16MF-D in Koosharem, Utah
- K16MG-D in Panguitch, Utah
- K16MH-D in Henrieville, Utah
- K16MI-D in Nephi, Utah
- K16MK-D in Laketown, etc., Utah
- K16ML-D in Corvallis, Oregon
- K16MM-D in Circleville, Utah
- K16MN-D in Wendover, Utah
- K16MP-D in Bluff & area, Utah
- K16MQ-D in Montezuma Creek & Aneth, Utah
- K16MR-D in Gateway, Colorado
- K16MS-D in Cedar City, Utah
- K16MT-D in Leamington, Utah
- K16MU-D in Scipio, Utah
- K16MV-D in Redwood Falls, Minnesota
- K16MW-D in Malad City, Idaho
- K16MX-D in Myton, Utah
- K16MY-D in Ashland, Montana
- K16MZ-D in Orangeville, Utah
- K16NA-D in Price, Utah
- K16NB-D in Ely & McGill, Nevada
- K16NC-D in Fruitland, Utah
- K16NE-D in Forsyth, Montana
- K16NF-D in Hot Springs, Montana
- K16NH-D in Wray, Colorado
- K16NJ-D in Anton, Colorado
- K16NK-D in Cave Junction, Oregon
- K16NN-D in Laredo, Texas
- K16NQ-D in Pocatello, Idaho
- K16NS-D in Redstone, Colorado
- K16NU-D in Mountain View, etc., Wyoming
- K43JV in Provo, Utah
- KADT-LD in Austin, Texas
- KAJL-LD in Fayetteville, Arkansas
- KCWC-DT in Thermopolis, Wyoming
- KCWC-DT in Lander, Wyoming
- KDTF-LD in San Diego, California
- KEVO-LD in Reno, Nevada
- KHSC-LD in Fresno, California
- KJNB-LD in Jonesboro, Arkansas
- KKIC-LD in Boise, Idaho
- KKTQ-LD in Cheyenne, Wyoming
- KMJF-LD in Columbus, Nebraska
- KOAB-TV in Madras, Oregon
- KORS-CD in Portland, Oregon, an ATSC 3.0 station
- KORX-CD in Walla Walla, Washington
- KPHE-LD in Phoenix, Arizona
- KPIC in Roseburg, Oregon
- KPXH-LD in Fort Collins, Colorado
- KQDK-CD in Denver, Colorado
- KSXE-LD in Sioux City, Iowa
- KTWM-LD in Lawton, Oklahoma
- KULU-LD in Park City, Utah
- KVAD-LD in Amarillo, Texas
- KXCC-LD in Corpus Christi, Texas
- W16CC-D in West Gate, Florida
- W16CL-D in Key West, Florida
- W16CW-D in Villalba, Puerto Rico
- W16CX-D in Panama City, Florida
- W16DN-D in Traverse City, Michigan
- W16DQ-D in Tampa, Florida
- W16DS-D in Birmingham, Alabama
- W16DT-D in Keyser, West Virginia
- W16DU-D in Bloomington, Wisconsin
- W16DV-D in Alexander City, Alabama
- W16DX-D in Aguada, Puerto Rico
- W16DZ-D in Tyron, North Carolina
- W16EB-D in Augusta, Kentucky
- W16EE-D in Augusta, Georgia
- W16EJ-D in Harrisburg, Pennsylvania
- W16EK-D in Douglas, Georgia
- W16EL-D in Augusta, Georgia
- WAAA-LD in Valparaiso, Indiana
- WALE-LD in Montgomery, Alabama
- WANA-LD in Naples, Florida
- WAPK-CD in Bristol, Virginia/Kingsport, Tennessee
- WDMA-CD in Macon, Georgia
- WDNI-CD in Indianapolis, Indiana
- WDRH-LD in Raleigh, North Carolina
- WDUM-LD in Philadelphia, Pennsylvania
- WEID-LD in South Bend, Indiana
- WEZK-LD in Knoxville, Tennessee
- WFNY-CD in Gloversville, New York
- WFWC-CD in Fort Wayne, Indiana
- WHMR-LD in Homestead, Florida
- WKDC-LD in Columbia, South Carolina
- WNBJ-LD in Jackson, Tennessee
- WNYS-CD in Ithaca, New York
- WOBC-CD in Battle Creek, Michigan
- WPYM-LD in Little Rock, Arkansas
- WRAP-LD in Cleveland, Ohio
- WRCF-CD in Orlando, Florida
- WRDP-LD in Columbus, Georgia
- WUSV-LD in Clarksburg, West Virginia
- WVAW-LD in Charlottesville, Virginia
- WWPI-LD in Presque Isle, Maine
- WWWN-LD in Memphis, Tennessee
- WWYA-LD in Honea Path, South Carolina
- WYTU-LD in Milwaukee, Wisconsin
- WZLH-LD in Syracuse, New York
- WZTS-LD in Hinton, West Virginia

The following low-power stations, which are no longer licensed, formerly broadcast on digital or analog channel 16:

- K16AA in Morongo Valley, California
- K16AF in Trapper Creek, Alaska
- K16CP-D in Granite Falls, Minnesota
- K16EW in Orangeville, Utah
- K16FE in Rolla, Missouri
- K16HP-D in East Wenatchee, Washington
- K16HQ-D in Georgetown, Idaho
- K16IG-D in Cottage Grove, Oregon
- K16JC-D in Beaumont, Texas
- KIMD-LD in Lufkin, Texas
- KOIW-LP in Mt. View, Hawaii
- W16AJ in Melbourne, Florida
- W16AL in Burlington, Vermont
- W16CV-D in Parkersburg, West Virginia
- WAZC-LP in Luray, Virginia
- WEPA-CD in Pittsburgh, Pennsylvania
- WKMH-LD in Peoria, Illinois
- WMJF-LP in Towson, Maryland
- WMKH-LD in Hilton Head Island, South Carolina
- WOOH-LP in Zanesville, Ohio
- WVCI-LP in Orlando, Florida
