= KPMF-LD =

Television station in Memphis, Tennessee

- Memphis, Tennessee (Note: Originally licensed to Paragould, Arkansas; moved to Memphis in an unknown year.); United States
- Channels: Digital: 24 (UHF); Virtual: 26

Programming
- Affiliations: see § Subchannels

Ownership
- Owner: Innovate Corp.; (DTV America Corporation)
- Sister stations: WQEK-LD

History
- Founded: October 2, 2012
- First air date: May 2016
- Former call signs: K26MF-D (2012–2016)
- Former channel numbers: Digital: 26 (UHF, 2016–2019)
- Former affiliations: Escape (June–October 2016); DrTV (October 2016–2017); AMGTV (2017–2018); Quest (2018–2022); MyNetworkTV (secondary, 2016–2022); beIN Sports Xtra (2022–2023); NBC True CRMZ (2023–2026)
- Call sign meaning: Paragould, Arkansas (original city of license), plus former K26MF-D call letters

Technical information
- Licensing authority: FCC
- Facility ID: 188801
- Class: LD
- ERP: 15 kW
- HAAT: 329.3 m (1,080 ft)
- Transmitter coordinates: 35°16′33″N 89°46′38″W

Links
- Public license information: LMS

KPMF-LD (channel 26) is a low-power television station in Memphis, Tennessee, United States, affiliated with several digital multicast networks. It is owned by Innovate Corp. alongside WQEK-LD (channel 36). The two stations' transmitters are co-located on the WATN/WLMT tower off Brief Road in the Brunswick section of unincorporated northeast Shelby County.

== History ==
Although granted a construction permit in 2012 by the Federal Communications Commission (FCC), the station was silent until 2016. Originally licensed to Paragould, Arkansas (in the Jonesboro market), it held the call sign K26MF-D from 2012 until January 2016, when the call sign was changed to the current KPMF-LD.

While the first three subchannels remain dark, KPMF signed on virtual channel 26.4 in May 2016 as an affiliate of The Country Network (formerly Zuus Country).

In late June 2016, the station's first three subchannels went on the air as affiliates of Katz Broadcasting-operated Escape and Laff on the first two subchannels. Also, Sony Pictures Television's GetTV movie network and FremantleMedia-owned Buzzr came on the air on channels 26.3 and 26.4, respectively. Buzzr replaced The Country Network. Channels 26.5 and 26.6 also went on the air as Sonlife Broadcasting Network and QVC affiliates.

Escape and Laff were replaced by different networks in October 2016. GetTV was moved up to KPMF-LD2, and Comet, which is a joint venture between the MGM studio and Sinclair Broadcast Group was launched onto the LD3 subchannel, with Buzzr remaining on the LD4 subchannel. The main subchannel became a MyNetworkTV affiliate, with programming from the Doctor Television Channel being broadcast outside of MyNetworkTV's programming schedule. If the station launched on a transmitter within the home market of its city of license, KPMF would have been the Jonesboro market's first MyNetworkTV affiliate. For a time, Memphis also had access to a second MyNetworkTV affiliate, WLMT, a full-power CW affiliate that ran MyNetworkTV programming on its second subchannel along with most of the MeTV programming schedule; however, MyNetworkTV programming on that sub-channel was eventually dropped, leaving KPMF as the sole MyNetworkTV affiliate in Memphis until 2021. Jonesboro eventually gained its own MyNetworkTV affiliate on September 3, 2018 when the LD3 subchannel of low-power dual Fox/CBS affiliate KJNB-LD/KJNE-LD picked up the programming service to supplement its own MeTV programming.

In January 2017, KPMF's DrTV affiliation on the main subchannel was replaced with AMGTV and, by 2018, Quest. However, MyNetworkTV remained on the main channel on weeknights until 2021, when both affiliations were replaced with beIN Sports Xtra on the main subchannel, resulting in MyNetworkTV moving back to WLMT as a secondary affiliation on its main subchannel, while WATN-TV launched a sixth digital subchannel with Quest. In 2018, the station moved from a transmitter site across the Mississippi River on a cell tower on Washington Street in downtown Marion, Arkansas, to the Tegna tower in Brunswick.

At an unknown time, Comet was replaced by infomercials (which also aired on a new seventh subchannel).

== Subchannels ==
The station's signal is multiplexed:

Subchannels of KPMF-LD
Subchannel	Res.	Short name	Programming
26.1	480i	KPMF-LD	Confess
26.2	480i	KPMF-LD	Infomercials (4:3)
26.3	480i	KPMF-LD	Jewelry TV (4:3)
26.4	480i	KPMF-LD	Buzzr
26.5	480i	KPMF-LD	SonLife (4:3)
26.6	480i	KPMF-LD	TeleXitos (4:3)
26.7	480i	KPMF-LD	Outlaw
