= WPBY-CD =

Television station in Lafayette, Indiana

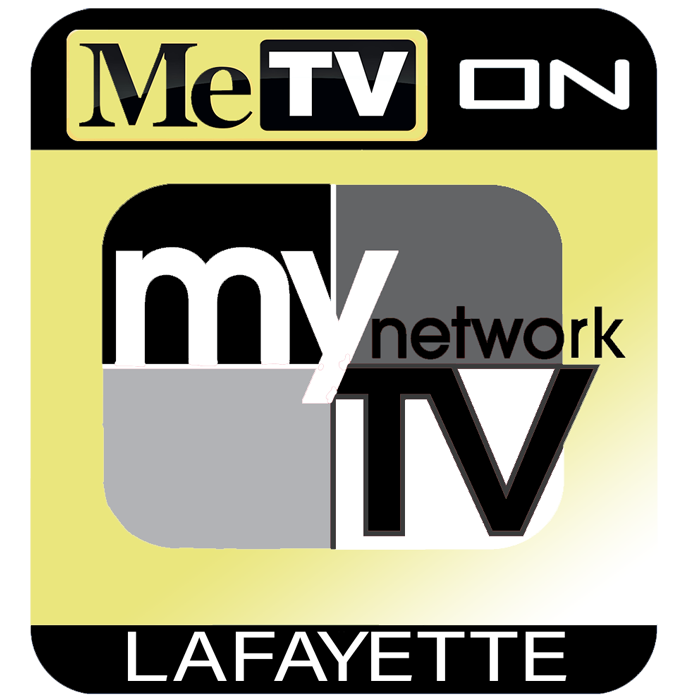
- Lafayette, Indiana; United States
- Channels: Digital: 35 (UHF); Virtual: 35
- Branding: ABC 35 Lafayette; Star City News; MeTV on MyNetworkTV Lafayette (35.2)

Programming
- Affiliations: 35.1: ABC; 35.2: MeTV/MyNetworkTV

Ownership
- Owner: Coastal Television Broadcasting Company LLC; (CTI License LLC)
- Sister stations: WPBI-CD

History
- Founded: February 22, 2011
- First air date: July 1, 2017
- Former call signs: W35CY-D (2011–2015); WECY-LD (2015–2018)
- Call sign meaning: Purdue Boilermakers, Lafayette

Technical information
- Facility ID: 184197
- ERP: 13 kW
- HAAT: 54.4 m (178 ft)
- Transmitter coordinates: 40°24′8.1″N 86°50′59″W

Links
- Website: starcitytv.com

WPBY-CD (channel 35) is a low-power, Class A television station in Lafayette, Indiana, United States, affiliated with ABC. It is owned by Coastal Television Broadcasting Company LLC alongside dual Fox/NBC affiliate WPBI-CD (channel 16). The two stations share studios on South 18th Street in Lafayette; WPBY-CD's transmitter is located on McCarty Lane on the city's east side.

== History ==
The station's construction permit was granted by the Federal Communications Commission (FCC) on February 22, 2011, under the call sign of W35CY-D. The calls were changed to WECY-LD on December 7, 2015. Originally licensed to Indianapolis and still a silent station, the station was under ownership of DTV America Corporation of Sunrise, Florida, until it was sold to Woodland Communications, an upstate New York-based broadcaster, in a station trade with DTV America in early 2017 (in the trade, DTV America got WWHC-LP in Olean, New York). The new owners then entered into a local marketing agreement with Star City Broadcasting, a partnership between Woodland and Waypoint Media, a company operated by Mike Reed.

The station's broadcasts began on July 1, 2017, providing the Lafayette market with the only missing local broadcast of a "Big Three" (ABC, CBS and NBC—or, including Fox, "big four") commercial network; before the station began broadcasting, ABC programming was provided to the Lafayette market on cable and satellite via WRTV. Though it has always branded as "WPBY", it did not officially take on the WPBY-LD call sign until February 9, 2018, following a swap with a station in Elmira, New York.

In April 2018, Star City Broadcasting entered into negotiations for the full purchase of WPBY-LD from Woodland. The application was approved by the FCC the following month.

In July 2021, Waypoint announced that it would sell nine of its television stations, including WPBY-LD and WPBI-LD, to Cumming, Georgia—based Coastal Television for $36.9 million. The sale was completed on January 4, 2022.

== Programming ==
In addition to ABC programming, WPBY-CD operates the Lafayette market's MeTV affiliate on its LD2 subchannel. On weeknights, WPBY-CD2 also carries programs from the MyNetworkTV programming service, filling in programming for all time slots outside of the MyNetworkTV programming schedule with the MeTV schedule. WPBY-CD2 also previously served as the Lafayette market's affiliate of the Chicago Cubs and White Sox broadcast television networks, carrying many of the games the teams broadcast locally in Chicago among WLS-TV and WGN-TV, though not those broadcast by NBC Sports Chicago. This arrangement ended in 2019, as each of Chicago's MLB, NBA and NHL teams signed exclusive deals with regional sports networks, ending their runs on free-to-air television for non-national games.

WPBY-CD carries select Purdue Boilermakers football games via ESPN College Football on ABC.

=== Newscasts ===
WPBY-CD presently offers 5 hours of local newscasts per week, all on weekdays. The newscasts, branded as Star City News, air at 7:00 and 11:00 p.m. The 7 p.m. newscast is exclusive to WPBY-CD, and the 11 p.m. newscast is also simulcast on WPBI-CD2. Chris Morisse Vizza, a 10-year veteran of WLFI-TV, was WPBY-LD's first news director. Sarah Blakely was the station's inaugural news anchor, broadcasting from a Waypoint-owned studio in Little Rock, Arkansas, airing segments from Lafayette-based reporters. Blakely also anchored similar newscasts on sister station KJNB-LD in Jonesboro, Arkansas. Waypoint Media's centralized news operation, known as News Hub since June 2019, was purchased by Coastal Television in July 2021.

Radio tie-ins of the newscasts are planned for WSHY, WBPE, WYCM, and WAZY-FM.

== Subchannels ==
The station's signal is multiplexed:

Subchannels of WPBY-CD
Channel	Res.	Short name	Programming
35.1	720p	WPBY	ABC
35.2	720p	MeTV	MeTV & MyNetworkTV
