= Wireless microphone licensing =

Wireless microphones may operate on various frequencies, either licensed or unlicensed, depending on the country.

== United Kingdom ==
In the UK, the use of wireless microphone systems requires a Wireless Telegraphy Act license, except for the license-free bands of 173.8–175.0 MHz and 863–865 MHz. These license-free bands are sometimes referred to as "Channel 70" (not to be confused with TV Channel 69, which operated on 854–862 MHz and always required a license from JFMG Ltd). However, licenses are no longer available for TV Channel 69.

Arqiva acquired the PMSE band manager JFMG from ITV in February 2009. JFMG was contracted by the communications regulator Ofcom to provide spectrum management and licensing services for Programme Making and Special Events (PMSE). However, in May 2015, Ofcom decided to terminate the contract with Arqiva and bring the existing services in-house.

Channel 69 was replaced by Channel 38 (606 MHz to 614 MHz) as the UK mobile radio microphone band. Licenses to use this band are issued on a shared basis, meaning that any frequency coordination between multiple users in or around a specific location must be managed by the users themselves. All shared license holders have equal rights to use the band.

In 2013, the UK communications regulator Ofcom held an auction to sell the UHF band from 790 MHz to 862 MHz for mobile broadband services. This decision faced objections from Andrew Lloyd Webber and many others.

The interleaved UHF spectrum, also known as white space, between 470 MHz and 606 MHz (Channels 21–37) and 614 MHz and 694 MHz (Channels 39–48) can be licensed on a site-specific coordinated basis. Coordinated licenses grant the holder exclusive use of specific frequencies or spectrum blocks at a particular location for a defined period. Coordination between users is managed by Arqiva PMSE as part of the licensing process.

In October 2025, OfCom announced its intention to bring the regulated 823 to 832Mhz and 1785 to 1805Mhz regulated frequency space into license exemption.

Frequencies are categorized as either regulated (requiring a license) or deregulated (license-exempt).

Band	Frequency	Licencing	Description	Examples
VHF	173.7 to 175.1 MHz	Deregulated	Typically, 3 to 4 frequencies can be accommodated.	Ofcom: 173.800, 174.200, 175.000; 4-channel example: 173.800, 174.100, 174.500, 175.000 (174.800 may cause interference.)
VHF	175.25 to 209.8 MHz	Regulated		
UHF	606.5 to 613.5 MHz	Regulated	Formally known as "Channel 38," this band can typically accommodate 10 to 12 frequencies.	Ofcom: 606.600, 607.500, 608.150, 609.150, 609.950, 610.550, 611.250, 612.300, 613.150, 613.500; Sennheiser G3 (bank 11, 13 frequencies): 606.500, 606.875, 607.375, 608.000, 608.425, 609.325, 609.775, 610.425, 611.000, 611.400, 612.000, 612.800, *[613.275].
UHF	823 to 832 MHz	Deregulated (since May 2026)	Formally known as "Channel 65," also referred to as the "Duplex Gap," this band was introduced in March 2015. Sennheiser indicate 12 microphone frequencies can be used with G3 or newer equipment.	Sennheiser G2 E-band equipment can only tune down to 830 MHz and may use up to four frequencies, such as: 830.100, 830.900, 831.300, and 831.900.
UHF	863.1 to 864.9 MHz	Deregulated	Formally known as "Channel 70," this band typically accommodates 4 frequencies.	Ofcom: 863.100, 863.700, 864.100, 864.900; Sennheiser (2014): 863.100, 863.500, 864.300, 864.900.; Sennheiser EW100 G3 and newer may accommodate 6 frequencies: 863.100, 863.400, 863.750, 864.225, 864.550, 864.975.
UHF	1785 to 1805 MHz	Deregulated (since May 2026)	The 1.8 GHz band was added in March 2015.	
UHF	1880 to 1900 MHz	Deregulated	The 'DECT' band is used by Sennheiser's 'SpeechLine' range, with a typical latency of 19 ms.	
UHF	2400 to 2483.5 MHz	Deregulated	The 'WiFi' band is also used for other purposes, including RFID, Bluetooth, microwave ovens, and industrial monitoring.	

== United States ==
Licenses are required to use wireless microphones on vacant TV channels in the United States, as they are part of the Broadcast Auxiliary Service (BAS). However, this requirement is often overlooked and rarely enforced by the FCC. Licenses are available only to broadcasters, cable networks, and television and film producers. The FCC has issued a Report and Order stating that it no longer allows Broadcast Auxiliary Service devices to operate in the 698–806 MHz portion of the spectrum due to the auction of the 700 MHz band. This change is unrelated to, but often confused with, the White Space device debate currently taking place in the U.S.

The same Report and Order, issued on January 15, 2010, also permits most wireless microphones and other 'low power auxiliary stations' in the "core TV band" (TV channels 2 through 51, except 37) to operate with a transmit power of up to 50 mW without a license, under a special waiver of Part 15 rules. A rule change to make this permanent has been proposed.

Some wireless microphone manufacturers are currently marketing wireless microphones for use in the United States that operate within the 944 to 952 MHz band, which is reserved for studio-transmitter link communications. These microphones have the potential to interfere with studio-transmitter links, and their use must be coordinated by the Society of Broadcast Engineers. Licenses for this band are only available to licensees of radio and TV stations, and broadcasters are likely to report unauthorized use due to the high potential for interference.

Changes beginning in 2017 concern operations on 600 MHz frequencies. Starting in 2017, the amount of TV band spectrum available for wireless microphone use decreased as a result of the incentive auction, which was completed on April 13, 2017. A significant portion of the TV band spectrum in the 600 MHz band, including most (but not all) of the spectrum on TV channels 38 to 51 (614 to 698 MHz), was repurposed for the new 600 MHz service band for wireless services and will no longer be available for wireless microphone use. Specifically, wireless microphones operating in the new 600 MHz service band (617 to 652 MHz and 663 to 698 MHz frequencies) must cease operation by July 13, 2020, and may be required to stop earlier if they could cause interference to new wireless licensees that begin operations in the 600 MHz service band. Spectrum will still be available for wireless microphone use on TV channels 2 to 36 (frequencies below 608 MHz), portions of the 600 MHz guard band (614 to 616 MHz), the 600 MHz duplex gap (653 to 663 MHz), and other spectrum bands outside of the TV bands.

== Australia ==
In Australia, the operation of wireless microphones with up to 100 mW EIRP between 520 MHz and 694 MHz is permitted on unused television channels under a class license. This allows any user to operate the devices without obtaining an individual license. However, the responsibility falls on the user of the wireless microphone to resolve any interference caused to licensed radio communications services. After December 31, 2014, operation will no longer be allowed in the frequency range of 694–820 MHz. Please refer to item 22A in the schedule of the class license for more details.

== Other countries ==
In many other countries, the use of wireless microphones requires a license. Some governments consider all radio frequencies to be military assets, and the use of unlicensed radio transmitters, including wireless microphones, may be severely punished.

Licensing in European countries is regulated by the Electronic Communications Committee (ECC), which is part of the European Conference of Postal and Telecommunications Administrations (CEPT) based in Denmark.
