= WSHY =

Radio station in Lafayette, Indiana

Coordinates: 40°21′42″N 86°52′41″W

- Lafayette, Indiana; United States
- Broadcast area: Lafayette metropolitan area
- Frequency: 1410 kHz
- Branding: 104.3 The Patriot

Programming
- Format: Conservative talk radio
- Affiliations: Premiere Networks; Salem Radio Network; Townhall Radio News

Ownership
- Owner: Coastal Television Broadcasting Company; (CTI License LLC)
- Sister stations: WAZY-FM, WBPE, WYCM

History
- First air date: November 28, 1959
- Former call signs: WAZY (1959–1982, 1998–2002); WFTE (1982–1984); WCFY (1984–1998); WLAS (2002–2007)

Technical information
- Licensing authority: FCC
- Facility ID: 21512
- Class: D
- Power: 1,000 watts (day); 60 watts (night)
- Translator: 104.3 W282CJ (Lafayette)

Links
- Public license information: Public file; LMS
- Webcast: Listen live
- Website: thepatriot1043fm.com

WSHY (1410 AM) is a commercial radio station in Lafayette, Indiana, United States. It broadcasts a conservative talk radio format. WSHY is owned by Coastal Television Broadcasting Company, through licensee CTI License LLC, as part of a cluster with Fox/NBC affiliate WPBI-LD, ABC affiliate WPBY-LD, and sister radio stations WBPE, WYCM and WAZY-FM. All six stations share studios and offices at 3824 South 18th Street in Lafayette, with WSHY's transmitter also located at the site.

Programming is also heard on 99 watt FM translator W282CJ at 104.3 MHz.

== History ==
On November 28, 1959, the station first signed on the air as WAZY. WAZY was joined by FM sister station WAZY-FM on October 1, 1964. Both radio stations were owned by WAZY Radio Inc., J.Edward "Ed" Willis was Owner, President and General Manager.

On March 1, 1970, ownership of both radio stations transferred to Radio Lafayette, Inc. Radio Lafayette was a subsidiary of the Peoria Journal Star newspaper, based in Peoria, Illinois. F. Patrick Nugent served as vice president and general manager. The stations simulcast a Top 40 format on both AM and FM.

By 1978, WAZY-FM had moved from the original 96.7 mHz frequency to 96.5 mHz, with a resulting increase in power from 3,000 watts to 50,000 watts. By 1980, WAZY was being programmed separately from WAZY-FM. WAZY broadcast a middle of the road (MOR) format, with popular adult music, news and sports.

Lightfoot Broadcasting acquired WAZY, switching the call sign to WFTE on January 7, 1982. The format shifted from MOR to Country music. The station also aired Notre Dame Fighting Irish football games during this period.

On July 4, 1984, ownership of WFTE was transferred from Lightfoot Broadcasting to Lafayette's First Assembly of God Church. As a result, the format was flipped to Contemporary Christian music with some Christian talk and teaching programs. The call letters switched to WCFY (We Care For You).

Artistic Media Partners acquired WCFY on September 30, 1998. Call letters were changed back to WAZY and the station launched with a News/talk format, which brought the format back to Lafayette 7 months after crosstown stations WASK-AM/FM dropped the format in favor of oldies.

As a talk station, "News/talk 1410 WAZY" carried programs such as Rush Limbaugh, Dr. Laura, and Jim Rome. The station also carried a short-lived local talk program hosted by Rick Mummey. A live audio feed of CNN Headline News covered all other dayparts.

The news/talk format was short-lived. It lasted a little less than two years with low ratings. In 1999, the format was dropped and 1410 kHz began simulcasting WAZY-FM's hot adult contemporary format. In 2000, the simulcast with WAZY-FM was dropped and the station began simulcasting WGBD's alternative rock format.

Later that year, in September 2000, the station broke away from WGBD's simulcast to run an Adult standards format via Westwood One. A year later, 1410 WAZY changed network affiliations, but remained adult standards with Jones Radio Network's "Music of Your Life." In August 2002, the call sign changed to WLAS, but the format remained for about a month before the station flipped to a full-time simulcast of Artistic Media Partner's country outlet, WLFF, now WBPE.

On May 3, 2007, WLAS changed call letters to WSHY and on December 6, 2007, the format was flipped to adult hits, simulcast with WLFF.

WSHY's programming went to a 24-hour-a-day simulcast of FM sister station, WBPE, "95.3 BOB FM." The simulcast was broken precisely at the top of each hour for station identification and throughout the year for Purdue University women's volleyball, baseball, and softball broadcasts. Through the simulcast of WBPE, WSHY also carried Purdue University women's basketball.

On April 1, 2013, WSHY split from its simulcast of WBPE 95.3 and changed the format to sports radio, branded as "Fox Sports 1410" and carrying the Fox Sports Radio Network.

Artistic Media Partners sold its Lafayette stations to Star City Broadcasting, owner of WPBI-LD (channel 16), in 2016. The transfer to Lafayette TV, LLC was completed on January 3, 2017.

On July 23, 2018, WSHY changed its format from sports to news/talk, branded as "104.3 The Patriot," simulcast on FM translator W282CJ 104.3 MHz.

In November 2019, it was announced that Standard Media would purchase all of the stations from Star City Broadcasting as part of their transaction to purchase all stations from Waypoint Media and Vision Communications. However, the sale collapsed.

Sister station WGGO in Salamanca, New York shared WSHY's programming lineup and branding from 2019 to 2021, with local commercials and weather forecasts inserted. WENI in Corning, New York and WENY in Elmira were added to the simulcast in 2020, but all three stations dropped the simulcast with WSHY in September 2021 when the stations were dispersed.

In July 2021, it was announced that Coastal Television Broadcasting Company would acquire all stations from Star City Broadcasting as part of their deal to purchase all stations from Waypoint and Vision. The sale were completed on January 4, 2022.
