= WBPE (FM) =

Radio station in Brookston, Indiana

Coordinates: 40.547°N 86.850°W

- Brookston, Indiana; United States
- Broadcast area: Lafayette metropolitan area
- Frequency: 95.3 MHz
- Branding: 95.3 BOB FM

Programming
- Format: Adult hits

Ownership
- Owner: Coastal Television Broadcasting Company; (CTI License LLC)
- Sister stations: WAZY-FM, WSHY, WYCM

History
- First air date: January 1, 1985
- Former call signs: WLZR (1985–1986); WKJM (1986–1991); WEZV-FM (1991–1998); WLFF (1998–2004); WSHP (2004–2005); WLFF (2005–2008)
- Call sign meaning: Bob Plays Everything

Technical information
- Licensing authority: FCC
- Facility ID: 6336
- Class: A
- ERP: 2,300 watts
- HAAT: 154 meters (505 ft)

Links
- Public license information: Public file; LMS
- Webcast: Listen Live
- Website: wbpefm.com

WBPE (95.3 MHz, "95.3 BOB FM") is a radio station licensed to Brookston, Indiana, United States, serving the Lafayette metropolitan area. The station is owned by Coastal Television Broadcasting Company, through licensee CTI License LLC, as part of a cluster with Fox/NBC affiliate WPBI-LD, ABC affiliate WPBY-LD, and sister radio stations WSHY, WYCM and WAZY-FM. The station's studios are located at 3824 South 18th Street in Lafayette.

== History ==
The station signed on the air on January 1, 1985, as WLZR "LAZER 95 - Lafayette's Only New Rock". When the station signed on, it became the highest rated station in the market. The new owner was a banker and former lawyer in Lafayette who realized the potential of a rock format.

However, just a year later, the new station was sold to Karson Jacobs Media who also owned an AM radio station in Bloomington, Illinois and another FM in Decatur, Illinois. The radio station had high ratings, but not making enough money to keep it in operation. He took his successful Adult Contemporary format on the station in Decatur and displaced the rock format as LITE ROCK, MAGIC 95 WKJM. The station's ratings struggled to make it in the top five; however, billing increased due to the new format.

The station would then try to compete with WAZY in the late 80s by flipping to CHR as POWER 95, retaining the WKJM calls. The stint as a CHR didn't last long since the station was purchased in June 1991 by Marion-based Bomar Broadcasting and re-launched the station with a more mainstream AC approach and gave it new call letters as WEZV. The station then became known as EZ 95.3.

Shortly thereafter, Bomar flipped WEZV to Beautiful Music (Easy Listening), simulcasting of WMRI/Marion (now WXXC) with local break inserts. WEZV would be one of two other Indiana stations "networked" to WMRI's beautiful music format; the other stations were WLEZ in Terre Haute (now WBOW) and WYEZ (now WHPZ) in Bremen (South Bend). During this period, WEZV referred to itself as "The EASY One--WEZV, 95.3 FM." Toward the end of Bomar's ownership of WEZV, the network began to skew away from instrumentals and lean more toward those from smooth jazz artists.

In August 1998, University Broadcasting (now Artistic Media Partners) purchased the radio station and moved it to its current location in Lafayette. It joined Alternative Rock WGBD (now WYCM) and Hot Adult Contemporary WAZY and, in September 1998, changed formats to Hot Country as 95.3 The Wolf. Call letters were changed a few days after the format change to WLFF.

During its inception as The Wolf, the station tried to find its niche within the Lafayette market. While maintaining a primarily mainstream country sound, the station leaned anywhere from gold-based to modern in order to lure listeners away from cross-town country leader, WKOA. Subtle name changes have also occurred over the years as well as a stint with satellite-fed programming. The station has referred to itself numerous times as 'The Wolf' with a few stints as 'Wolf Country.' The Wolf saw its biggest success around 2003 when the station adopted a full-service sound similar to that of its crosstown country competitor. On November 26, 2006, 95.3 The Wolf began carrying Waitt Radio Networks. This would be the second time the station carried the network throughout its run.

In 2004 Artistic Media Partners swapped signals with co-owned Classic Rock WSHP, and in 2005 swapped back to its original signal at 95.3 placing Purdue Men's and Women's Basketball and Football on the station.

Despite the rights to Purdue Men's and Women's Basketball and Football, WLFF was never able to unseat WKOA as the country leader in the market. On December 5, 2007, after 9 years in the country format, The Wolf began stunting with a music mix consisting of party hits and children's music. At noon on December 6, 2007, the format officially flipped to adult hits as 95.3 Bob FM.

Previous logo

On January 28, 2008, 95.3 changed its call letters to WBPE to better match its new on-air identity.

Artistic Media Partners sold its Lafayette stations to Star City Broadcasting, owner of WPBI-LD (channel 16), in 2016. The transfer to Lafayette TV, LLC was completed on January 3, 2017.

In November 2019, it was announced that Standard Media would purchase all of the stations from Star City Broadcasting as part of their transaction to purchase all stations from Waypoint Media and Vision Communications. However, the sale collapsed.

In July 2021, it was announced that Coastal Television Broadcasting Company would acquire all stations from Star City Broadcasting as part of their deal to purchase all stations from Waypoint and Vision. The sale were completed on January 4, 2022.

== Programming ==
95.3 Bob FM, like other Bob FM formats across the US and Canada, features a mix of classic 1960s, 1970s, 1980s and 1990s hits with some current hot adult contemporary singles.

WBPE is the home of Purdue Women's Basketball.

WBPE is currently streaming live on its website.
