= WAZY-FM =

Radio station in Lafayette, Indiana

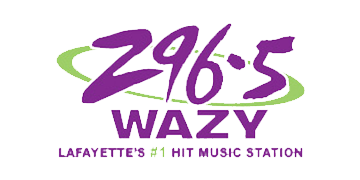
- Lafayette, Indiana; United States
- Broadcast area: Lafayette metropolitan area
- Frequency: 96.5 MHz
- Branding: Z96-5

Programming
- Format: Contemporary hit radio

Ownership
- Owner: Coastal Television Broadcasting Company; (CTI License LLC)
- Sister stations: WBPE, WSHY, WYCM

History
- First air date: October 1, 1964

Technical information
- Licensing authority: FCC
- Facility ID: 68970
- Class: B
- ERP: 50,000 watts
- HAAT: 152 meters (499 ft)
- Transmitter coordinates: 40°23′2.00″N 87°07′55.00″W
- Translator: 92.3 W222AS (West Lafayette)

Links
- Public license information: Public file; LMS
- Webcast: Listen live
- Website: wazy.com

WAZY-FM (96.5 FM, "Z96-5") is a radio station in Lafayette, Indiana, United States, owned by Coastal Television Broadcasting Company, through licensee CTI License LLC, as part of a cluster with Fox/NBC affiliate WPBI-LD, ABC affiliate WPBY-LD, and sister radio stations WBPE, WSHY and WYCM. The studios are located at 3824 South 18th Street in Lafayette. WAZY-FM is the flagship station for Purdue University Football.

WAZY-FM broadcasts from a 499-foot tower near Greenhill, Indiana. Originally the radio station broadcast at 96.7 MHz. By 1978, WAZY-FM had moved to 96.5 mHz, with an increase in power from 3,000 watts to 50,000 watts.

== History ==
Owned by WAZY Radio Inc., WAZY-FM signed on the air October 1, 1964. It joined sister AM radio station WAZY, today known as WSHY. Owner J.Edward "Ed" Willis served as president and general manager for WAZY Radio Inc. Both radio stations programmed a simulcast of contemporary Top 40 music.

On March 1, 1970, ownership of both radio stations transferred to Radio Lafayette, Inc. (group owner: the Peoria (IL) Journal-Star newspaper) with F. Patrick Nugent serving as vice president and general manager. Hal Youart, later the station's general manager, was widely regarded as the person who grew WAZY-FM into the successful station it was.

As the radio station began to grow, the sister AM station's influence lessened. Some of the talent and programming staff that worked for WAZY in the 1970s moved on to become programmers in New York City, Philadelphia, and Chicago. The tide really turned for the station when it flipped its top-forty-by-day and AOR by night format to all Top Forty. Jeffrey Jay Weber, who later became one of the first PD's to make the move directly to GM when he left the station to go to an AM-FM in Terre Haute, was instrumental in the station's growth in the late seventies, along with jocks like Bobby Day, Dan Michaels, Lou Patrick, Scott Dugan, Bob Leonard, Keith Harris and Steve West.

By 1980, WAZY was being programmed separately from WAZY-FM. The AM sister station format shifted to adult MOR. Lightfoot Broadcasting acquired WAZY-FM, along with the AM sister station now using the call letters WFTE on January 7, 1982. During the period, WAZY-FM became its former Z96 name.

In 1984, WAZY-FM became an affiliate of American Top 40 with Casey Kasem.

RadioVision Partners Ltd., later named University Broadcasting, now known as Artistic Media Partners acquired WAZY-FM in October 1986. Thomm Kristi was program Director. Steve Brigandi was news director.

History-making ratings (36 share) were achieved in the '80s with Jim Stacy as program director, and talent including Steve West (mornings), Steve Louizos, Dr. Dave (Dave Gross), which was featured on the cover of Friday Morning Quarterback.

In 1995 under program director John Flint (Harrison), WAZY-FM switched from a top 40 format to a hot adult contemporary format, positioning the station as, "The Best Of the 80's and 90's."

In the fall of 2000, WAZY-FM leadership decided to soften its musical approach and flipped to adult contemporary. On March 16, 2001, just six months after the switch to AC, WAZY-FM returned to the Contemporary Hits Radio (Top 40) format. It remained 96.5 WAZY until September 28, 2006, when it switched to "Lafayette's #1 Hit Music Station - Z96-5".

In 2004, Artistic Media Partners, as a part of company-wide sports programming realignment initiative, moved Purdue University Football and Men's Basketball off WAZY-FM to their classic rock sister station, WSHP, and the following year to country sister, WLFF. This resulted in two frequency flip-flops between WLFF and WSHP in a less than 18 months. Beginning in the fall of 2007, WAZY-FM once again became the flagship station for Purdue football.

Brandon Adams is the current WAZY-FM program director, and has been in the position since June 2021. He also hosts "B-Adams in the Morning" weekdays on the station from 6 AM - 10 AM.

Artistic Media Partners sold its Lafayette stations to Star City Broadcasting, owner of WPBI-LD (channel 16), in 2016. The transfer to Lafayette TV, LLC was completed on January 3, 2017.

In November 2019, it was announced that Standard Media would purchase all of the stations from Star City Broadcasting as part of their transaction to purchase all stations from Waypoint Media and Vision Communications. However, the sale collapsed.

In July 2021, it was announced that Coastal Television Broadcasting Company would acquire all stations from Star City Broadcasting as part of their deal to purchase all stations from Waypoint and Vision. The sale were completed on January 4, 2022.

== Programming ==
WAZY-FM currently plays a contemporary hit radio format.

WAZY-FM is a local primary source-2 for the Indiana Emergency Alert System.

WAZY-FM is currently streaming online at their website.

=== Former programming ===
On February 16, 1987, WAZY-FM became a former affiliate of ABC News Radio.
