= KATN =

Television station in Fairbanks, Alaska

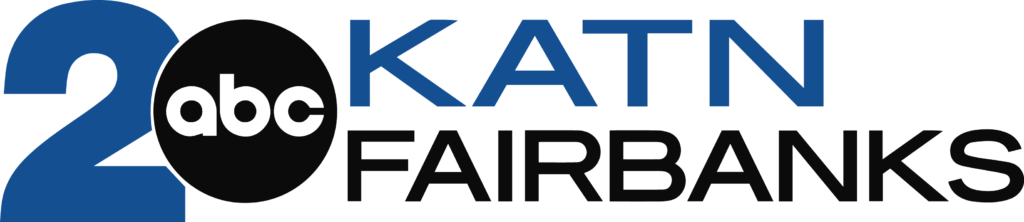
- Fairbanks, Alaska; United States
- Channels: Digital: 18 (UHF); Virtual: 2
- Branding: ABC 2; Fox Alaska (DT2); The CW Alaska (DT3); Your Alaska Link (newscasts)

Programming
- Affiliations: 2.1: ABC; 2.2: Fox; 2.3: The CW Plus; for others, see § Subchannels

Ownership
- Owner: Vision Alaska LLC; (KATN and KJUD License, LLC)
- Operator: Coastal Television Broadcasting Company LLC

History
- First air date: March 1, 1955
- Former call signs: KFAR-TV (1955–1981); KTTU-TV (1981–1984)
- Former channel numbers: Analog: 2 (VHF, 1955–2009)
- Former affiliations: NBC (primary 1955–1985, secondary 1985–1996); The WB 100+ (DT2, 1998–2006); The CW+ (DT2, 2006–2017; now on DT3)
- Call sign meaning: Alaska Television Network

Technical information
- Licensing authority: FCC
- Facility ID: 13813
- ERP: 16 kW
- HAAT: 230 m (755 ft)
- Transmitter coordinates: 64°55′17.4″N 147°42′57.7″W
- Translator(s): K13KU-D 13 (UHF) Delta Junction

Links
- Public license information: Public file; LMS
- Website: www.youralaskalink.com

KATN (channel 2) is a television station in Fairbanks, Alaska, United States, affiliated with ABC, Fox, and The CW Plus. It is owned by Vision Alaska LLC and operated by Coastal Television Broadcasting Company LLC. KATN's studios are located in the Lathrop Building on 2nd Avenue in downtown Fairbanks, and its transmitter is located on Cranberry Ridge northeast of the city.

== History ==
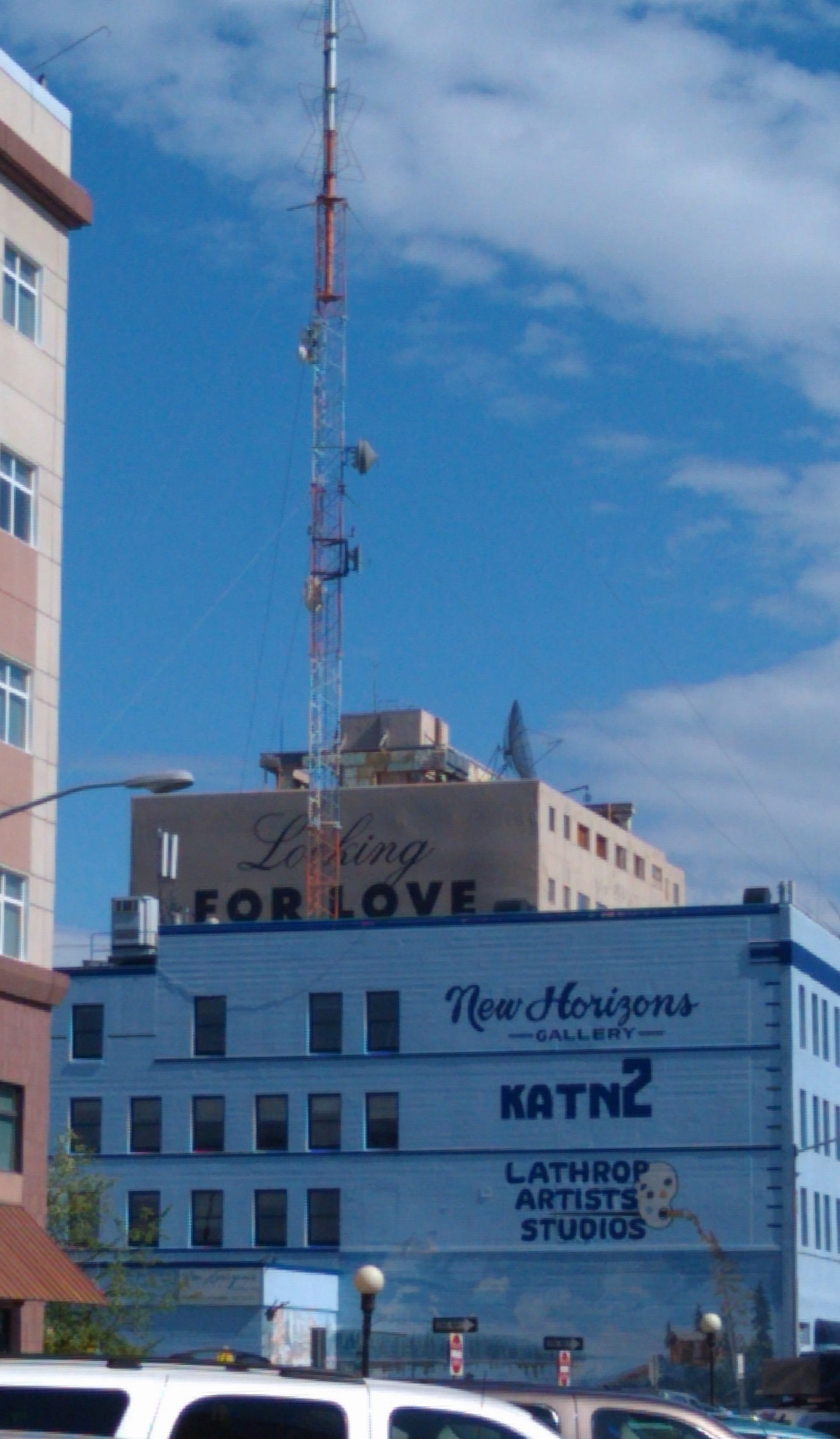
KATN's studios are located in the Lathrop Building in downtown Fairbanks.

KATN debuted on March 1, 1955, as KFAR-TV, and was Fairbanks' second television station after KTVF. It became KTTU-TV (no relation to the present-day station in Tucson, Arizona) on June 18, 1981, and KATN on August 18, 1984. It was the first television station in Fairbanks to broadcast in color in 1967 (while KTVF was temporarily off the air due to a flood).

KFAR/KTTU was primarily an NBC station with ABC as the secondary network until 1985, when the owners of KIMO (now KYUR) in Anchorage bought the station, changed the call letters (the ATN in KATN stood for "Alaska Television Network", a consortium of KATN, KIMO, and KJUD in Juneau), and made KATN the primary ABC affiliate. The station continued carrying NBC programs as a secondary affiliate until KTVF switched from CBS to NBC in 1996, in response to KATN's new ownership. Until the launch of KFXF in 1992, they were Fairbanks' only two commercial network stations.

In September 2006, KATN began to show programming from The CW (via The CW Plus) on its digital subchannel.

Smith Media sold KATN and the remainder of the "ABC Alaska's Superstation" system to Vision Alaska LLC in 2010. When the sale was completed, on May 13, 2010, Coastal Television Broadcasting Company LLC entered into a time brokerage agreement with Vision Alaska to operate KATN and sister station KJUD.

On October 30, 2017, Fox announced that it would move its Fairbanks affiliation from KFXF-LD (channel 22) to a subchannel of KATN on November 4.

In 2022, the station and its sisters outsourced their news programming to News Hub, which had recently been acquired by Coastal Television, as Your Alaska Link News.

== Technical information ==
=== Subchannels ===
The station's signal is multiplexed:

Subchannels of KATN
Subchannel	Res.	Short name	Programming
2.1	720p	ABC	ABC
2.2	720p	FOX	Fox (4:3)
2.3	480i	CW	The CW Plus (4:3)
2.4	480i	ION	Ion
2.5	480i	MYSTERY	Ion Mystery (4:3)
2.6	480i	Grit	Grit
2.7	480i	CourtTV	Court TV
2.8	480i	Dabl	Dabl

=== Conversion to digital signal ===
KATN shut down its analog signal, over VHF channel 2, on June 12, 2009, the official date on which full-power television stations in the United States transitioned from analog to digital broadcasts under federal mandate. The station's digital signal remained on its pre-transition UHF channel 18, using virtual channel 2.
