= Channel 16 (Israel) =

- Country: Israel
- Broadcast area: Israel
- Headquarters: 14 Klausner Street, Ramat Aviv, Tel Aviv, Israel

Programming
- Language: Hebrew

Ownership
- Owner: Itzik Hadad

History
- Launched: 28 June 2026; 3 months ago

Channel 16 (Hebrew: ערוץ 16) is an Israeli commercial television channel that began broadcasting on 28 June 2026. The channel broadcasts daily news and programs on topics like current affairs, culture, entertainment and reality. Channel 16 doesn't broadcast on Shabbat.

The channel's audience can influence broadcast content using an AI tool called SAY16.

The channel's studios are located at 14 Klausner Street, Ramat Aviv, Tel Aviv, in the Israeli Educational Television building.

The channel is owned by real estate developer Itzik Hadad, and the construction manager is Ram Landes and his company Kuda Communications.

The main newscast is hosted by Ya'akov Eilon. The channel also recruited Maor Zaguri to run the source productions, Zvika Hadar to run the entertainment productions, and Yael Bar Zohar and Eylon Levy to host the channel's morning segment.
