= Antenna structure registration in the United States =

U.S. Antenna Structure Registration rules are contained in Part 17 of Federal Communications Commission Rules (47 C.F.R. 17). The purpose of these rules is to regulate via the Federal Aviation Administration (FAA) and the FCC antenna structures in the US that are taller than 60.96 meters (200 feet) above ground level or that may interfere with the flight path of a nearby airport.

In a Report and Order released November 30, 1995, the Commission adopted rules designed to streamline the registration process and began requiring antenna structure owners (instead of licensees) to register these structures with the Commission. In a Memorandum of Opinion and Order on Reconsideration released March 8, 2000, the Commission clarified several registration requirements. All registrations are filed via FCC Form 854.

== Databases ==
The Universal Licensing System (ULS) database downloads for specific wireless radio services are available to the public as zip files which are updated weekly. These files contain application data or license data for a specific radio service, and contains all the licenses or applications that exist for that radio service.
