= WYCM =

Radio station in Attica, Indiana

Coordinates: 40.384°N 87.132°W

- Attica, Indiana; United States
- Broadcast area: Lafayette metropolitan area
- Frequency: 95.7 MHz
- Branding: MeTV Music 95.7

Programming
- Format: Soft oldies
- Affiliations: Compass Media Networks; Westwood One

Ownership
- Owner: Coastal Television Broadcasting Company; (CTI License LLC)
- Sister stations: WAZY-FM, WBPE, WSHY

History
- First air date: 1988
- Former call signs: WBQR (1988–1994); WGBD (1994–2001); WSHP (2001–2004); WLFF (2004–2005); WSHP (2005–2014)
- Call sign meaning: Your Country Music (previous format)

Technical information
- Licensing authority: FCC
- Facility ID: 68985
- Class: A
- ERP: 3,100 watts
- HAAT: 132 meters

Links
- Public license information: Public file; LMS
- Webcast: Listen Live
- Website: metv.fm/wycm/

WYCM (95.7 FM "MeTV Music 95.7") is a radio station licensed to Attica, Indiana, United States, serving the Lafayette metropolitan area. The station is owned by Coastal Television Broadcasting Company, through licensee CTI License LLC, as part of a cluster with Fox/NBC affiliate WPBI-LD, ABC affiliate WPBY-LD, and sister radio stations WBPE, WSHY and WAZY-FM. The studios are located at 3824 South 18th Street in Lafayette with the tower facility located in rural eastern Warren County, near Greenhill, Indiana.

== History ==
WYCM signed on in late 1988 as WBQR. At the time, the station broadcast from Attica featuring an eclectic mix of folk, progressive rock, and Celtic sounds.

In 1994, the station was sold to Artistic Media Partners, which moved the station to the Lafayette market. Upon acquisition, WBQR flipped format to New Country as “Big Dog 95-7.” Calls were also changed to WGBD, reflecting the station name. The station went head-to-head against the market's long-established country leader, K105. K105's loyal listeners, however, did not embrace the new country station. After two years, the format was dropped.

In 1996, Big Dog 95 began stunting with Led Zeppelin's "Stairway to Heaven" and Elton John’s “Rocket Man.” A few days later, the station was relaunched as “Modern Rock 95-7, The Rocket,” featuring an Alternative rock format with the newly syndicated, and locally popular, Bob & Tom Show anchoring mornings. Until The Rocket began broadcasting the show, Lafayette area listeners had to tune to Indianapolis’ Q95, WFBQ, to listen to the show, which accounted for the station's unusually high ratings in the Lafayette market.

The Rocket quickly became a very widely listened-to radio station throughout the Greater Lafayette area winning in many younger demographics throughout its run, according to Arbitron. The success of the station can be credited to two things. One, modern rock nationwide reached its peak in popularity during the period when The Rocket was an alternative rock station. Two, the Lafayette market did not have a Top 40 station in the market at the time. The Rocket, in other words, became the market default for hit music. In 2000, Radio and Records reported WGBD as the highest-rated alternative rock station in the country.

As an alternative rock station, The Rocket embraced the fact that they were broadcasting to a college town by escaping from the norm of many other alternative rock stations throughout the country. WGBD played all of the alternative rock core artists heard everywhere else such as The Foo Fighters, Metallica, Nirvana, Green Day, 311, The Dave Matthews Band, etc., but also played artists heard largely on Indie rock stations such as Liz Phair, The Rentals, The Dandy Warhols, Ween, and King Missile. This made the station unique and very popular amongst the area's true alternative and mainstream alternative fans alike. During much of its existence, WSHP programming was largely automated. Steve Clark, program director, served as the afternoon disk jockey; evening, overnight, and weekend talent occasionally filled the remaining air shifts. Syndicated programming consisted of the weekend modern rock countdown show “Out of Order with Jed the Fish” and “Loveline.” The station also aired the entire radio broadcast of “Woodstock ’99.”

In 2000, while the station was broadcasting an Alternative rock format, The Rocket was credited by Arbitron and Radio and Records magazine as the highest-rated alternative rock station in the country.

In March and April 2001, The Rocket's parent company, Artistic Media Partners, made the decision to realign some of their stations in the Greater Lafayette area. Sister-station WAZY returned to its Top 40 roots on March 16 after seven years away from the format. As a result of WAZY's flip, management cited The Rocket as a direct competitor with their newly launched Top 40 format, and The Rocket's format needed to be changed. Many radio professionals at the time did not quite understand this logic and argued that the stations could have coexisted with one another and given AMP ownership over the area's younger listeners. Top 40 appeals primarily to young females while alternative rock appeals primarily to males 18–34.

On March 30, The Rocket began stunting with R.E.M.'s “It's the End of the World as We Know It (And I Feel Fine).” On April 2 at 10a.m., the station relaunched with Classic rock. The Rocket name stayed intact, but the station earned the better-suited calls of WSHP. The first songs played on the new classic rock version of The Rocket were Queen's “We Will Rock You” and “We are the Champions.” Longtime program director Steve Clark also stayed through the change and former part-timer Dan Somers returned after stints in Indianapolis and Anderson/Muncie to host the afternoon show known as "The Dan Somers Experience", a take off on Poison guitarist C.C. Deville's solo band, "The C.C. Deville Experience", not an ode to Jimi Hendrix, as some thought. Dan Somers was let go due to budget cuts in February 2003 and now hosts the mid-days at crosstown rival WASK-FM.

In 2004, Artistic Media Partners adopted a new initiative to move all their sports programming to better fitting formats within their Lafayette, Bloomington, and South Bend properties. This would take most sports off their female-targeted Top 40 stations and move them to their primarily male-targeted properties. WSHP was chosen to be the Purdue flagship station. As a result, Artistic Media Partners decided to swap WSHP's signal with co-owned country station WLFF in order to gain rights for being the flagship station for Purdue Men's Basketball and Football. WSHP moved to 95.3 while WLFF moved to 95.7. It was cited in the Lafayette Journal and Courier that the frequency switch to 95.3 was necessary in order for The Rocket to carry the games. 95.3's signal was more dominant through the stadium section of the Purdue campus. Women's games formerly heard on 95.3 moved with The Wolf to 95.7.

The move turned out to be very successful for The Rocket. According to the fall 2004 Arbitron ratings, WSHP became the number 2 radio station 12+ in the market. However, this move was short-lived. In August 2005, just 17 months after the stations traded dial positions, they moved back to their original homes. The Rocket moved back to 95.7 and lost its Purdue flagship station status. Starting in the 2007–2008 season, Purdue sports have been divided amongst the Artistic Media Partners Lafayette stations, a move that has made it difficult for Purdue sports fans to find their team's broadcasts. WBPE (formerly WLFF) & 1410 WSHY remains the home of Purdue Women's Basketball, WAZY is the home of Purdue Football, and WSHP is the home of Purdue Men's Basketball.

In 2007, Steve Clark stepped down from his role to become the programming consultant. Rob Creighton took over Steve's responsibilities as program director. Rob Creighton was fired by Artistic Media as yet another move to cut operational costs at the end of December 2010.

On October 5, 2013, WSHP changed formats to country, branded as "Your Country 95.7"., and abandoned fans of classic rock. The station's website features a splashface logo with a section thanking the listeners and having a section asking what the listeners should name the station, possibly meaning the "Your Country" branding is only temporary. However, another website linked to it possibly reveals the new branding as 95.7 The Bull, joining other nationwide country stations with the branding. On February 28, 2014, WSHP changed callsigns to WYCM.

Artistic Media Partners sold its Lafayette stations to Star City Broadcasting, owner of WPBI-LD (channel 16), in 2016. The transfer to Lafayette TV, LLC was completed on January 3, 2017.

On March 26, 2018, the station tweaked its branding, repositioning as "Y95" while retaining the country format.

In November 2019, it was announced that Standard Media would purchase all of the stations from Star City Broadcasting as part of their transaction to purchase all stations from Waypoint Media and Vision Communications. However, the sale collapsed.

In July 2021, it was announced that Coastal Television Broadcasting Company would acquire all stations from Star City Broadcasting as part of their deal to purchase all stations from Waypoint and Vision. The sale were completed on January 4, 2022.

On April 1, 2025, WYCM changed their format from country to soft oldies, branded as "MeTV Music 95.7".

== Programming ==
While broadcasting under the slogan "Lafayette's Classic Rock," WSHP's playlist was composed primarily of 70s and 80s songs, although select rock hits from the 60s and 90s were also included. With the exception of Rob Creighton's shift, most WSHP programming aired without disk jockeys.

The syndicated Bob & Tom Show aired on WSHP for the last time on October 20, 2010 (and still airs in the Lafayette area from its home studios at WFBQ, 94.7, Indianapolis). General manager Ernie Caldemone, as quoted in an October 28, 2010 Lafayette Journal and Courier article, said, "Every three to five years a contract (renewal) comes up and we just decided this was not a time to be broadcasting Bob and Tom. There are people who are upset. But after we share with them the reasoning for it, they understand. It's strictly a business decision."

From Monday, November 1, 2010, through Saturday, December 25, 2010, WSHP switched from classic rock to an all Christmas music format, according to the Lafayette Journal and Courier. North Pole Radio programming aired around the clock until midnight on Sunday, December 26, 2010, when WSHP returned as 95-7 The Rocket, only this time with an Active Rock format. The new format would be short-lived. In mid-January 2011, the station quietly returned to the classic rock format that the station previously carried only without Bob and Tom.

North Pole Radio returned to the frequency on November 18, 2011. According to an article in the Lafayette Journal & Courier newspaper, the Christmas format will run through December 31. The station returned to its previous classic rock format after the holidays.

In 2014 Artistic Media Partners gave up trying to do something original and changed the format to Contemporary Country and is now competing poorly against WKOA/105.3 (Lafayette, WCDQ/106.3 (Crawfordsville) and WWKI/100.5 (Kokomo) for listeners. Local Classic Rock fans were left with no radio station in the DMA. Former listeners have turned to local Hard Rock/Metal station WKHY (Lafayette), WFBQ (Indianapolis) or WIM (Crawfordsville).

WYCM is the flagship station for Purdue Men's Basketball.

== Previous logos ==
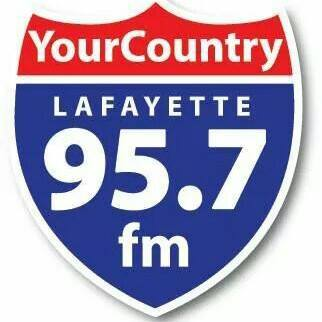
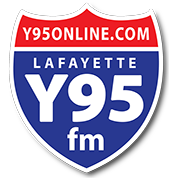
