= Channel 16 TV stations in Mexico =

The following television stations broadcast on digital channel 16 in Mexico:

- XHATZ-TDT on Altzomoni, State of Mexico
- XHBAC-TDT in Bacerac, Sonora
- XHBD-TDT in Zacatecas, Zacatecas
- XHBZ-TDT in Colima, Colima
- XHCCS-TDT in Cananea, Sonora
- XHCTIX-TDT in Pachuca, Hidalgo
- XHCTLV-TDT in Coatzacoalcos, Veracruz
- XHCTOX-TDT in Oaxaca, Oaxaca
- XHDE-TDT in San Luis Potosí, San Luis Potosí
- XHDVS-TDT in Divisadero, Sonora
- XHENE-TDT in Ensenada, Baja California
- XHHR-TDT in Ojinaga, Chihuahua
- XHKW-TDT in Morelia, Michoacán
- XHQBI-TDT in Querobabi, Sonora
- XHSCC-TDT in San Cristóbal de Las Casas, Chiapas
- XHTPZ-TDT in Tampico, Tamaulipas
- XHUNES-TDT in Durango, Durango
