= WPBI-CD =

Television station in Lafayette, Indiana

- Lafayette, Indiana; United States
- Channels: Digital: 17 (UHF); Virtual: 16
- Branding: Fox 16 Lafayette; NBC 16 Lafayette (16.2); Star City News

Programming
- Affiliations: 16.1: Fox; 16.2: NBC

Ownership
- Owner: Coastal Television Broadcasting Company LLC; (CTI License LLC)
- Sister stations: WPBY-CD

History
- Founded: February 22, 2011
- First air date: October 25, 2016
- Former call signs: W16DB-D (2011–2016)
- Former channel numbers: Digital: 16 (UHF, 2016–2019)
- Former affiliations: ABC (16.3, simulcast of WPBY-CD, until 2025)
- Call sign meaning: Purdue Boilermakers, Indiana

Technical information
- Licensing authority: FCC
- Facility ID: 184193
- ERP: 15 kW
- HAAT: 54.4 m (178 ft)
- Transmitter coordinates: 40°24′8.13″N 86°50′59.03″W

Links
- Public license information: Public file; LMS
- Website: starcitytv.com

WPBI-CD (channel 16) is a low-power, Class A television station in Lafayette, Indiana, United States, affiliated with Fox and NBC. It is owned by Coastal Television Broadcasting Company LLC alongside ABC affiliate WPBY-CD (channel 35). The two stations share studios on South 18th Street in Lafayette. WPBI-CD's transmitter is located on McCarty Lane on the city's east side; the signal is oriented to the northwest.

== History ==
The station's construction permit was issued by the Federal Communications Commission (FCC) on February 22, 2011, under the call sign of W16DB-D. The station's call sign was changed back and forth between WPBH-LD and WPBI-LD in August and October 2016 until October 18, 2016, when WPBI was settled upon. WPBI-LD started airing on October 25, 2016. The station signed on from the start as the Lafayette area's Fox affiliate, with NBC being launched on the second subchannel; the station was owned by Waypoint Media, a company operated by Mike Reed. Prior to the launch of WPBI-LD its owner, Lafayette TV LLC purchased four Lafayette market radio stations from Artistic Media Partners Inc.

WPBI-LD's two subchannels are the first Fox and NBC affiliates ever based in the Lafayette market; before the station signed on, Indianapolis television stations WXIN and WTHR served as the default Fox and NBC affiliates for Lafayette via cable and satellite. Cable television providers Comcast Xfinity and Metronet began carrying WPBI in November 2016. Despite discontinuing carriage of Indianapolis-based Fox and NBC affiliates, satellite television provider DirecTV has said it plans to carry WPBI-LD and WPBI-LD2 but has not announced its timetable for doing so.

From 1953 until WPBI's 2016 launch, WLFI-TV had been the only "Big Three" (ABC, CBS and NBC—or, including Fox, "big four") network television broadcaster in the Lafayette market.

In July 2021, Waypoint announced that it would sell nine of its television stations, including WPBY-LD and WPBI-LD, to Cumming, Georgia–based Coastal Television for $36.9 million. The sale was completed on January 4, 2022.

== Programming ==
=== Sports programming ===
WPBI-CD carries select Purdue Boilermakers football games via Fox College Football, and since 2023 via Big Ten Saturday Night on NBC. Some non-conference Purdue games may air on sister station WPBY-CD via ESPN College Football on ABC.

WPBI-CD has blacked out live broadcasts of the Indianapolis 500 to continue to enforce analog-era restrictions when Indianapolis stations served Lafayette to encourage attendance; the race otherwise airs on tape delay with the Indianapolis affiliate (from 2016, over its second NBC channel with WTHR; and from 2025, on its Fox channel with WXIN). The race has aired live on WPBI-LD in 2020 due to no fans, 2021 due to a sellout with limited attendance, 2024 due to a weather delay as a public service to those who had to leave early, and 2025 and 2026 due to sellouts.

=== News operation ===
After beginning local weather coverage on January 1, 2017, WPBI aired its inaugural Star City News broadcast on May 29, 2017. As of 2017, WPBI broadcast 7 1/2 hours of local newscasts each week, all on weekdays. The newscasts aired at 6 and 11 p.m. on NBC 16 and at 10 p.m. on Fox 16. The 6 p.m. newscast was exclusive to WPBI-LD2, while the 11 p.m. newscast also simulcast on WPBY-CD.

Chris Morisse Vizza, a 10-year veteran of WLFI-TV, became WPBI's first news director. Sarah Blakely became the station's inaugural news anchor, broadcasting from a Media Gateway–owned studio in Little Rock, Arkansas, airing segments from Lafayette-based Vizza. Blakely also anchored similar newscasts on sister station KJNB-LD in Jonesboro, Arkansas. Waypoint Media purchased Media Gateway's centralized news operation in June 2019 and renamed it to News Hub; News Hub was purchased by Coastal Television in July 2021.

Radio tie-ins of the newscasts are planned for WSHY, WBPE, WYCM, and WAZY-FM.

== Subchannels ==
The station's signal is multiplexed:

Subchannels of WPBI-CD
Channel	Res.	Short name	Programming
16.1	720p	WPBI	Fox
16.2	1080i	WPBI-2	NBC
