= WJKP-LD =

Television station in Corning, New York

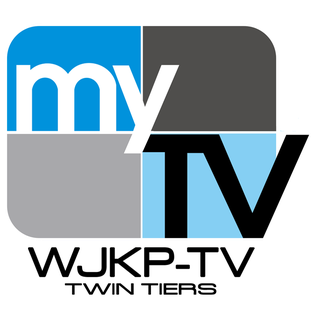
- Corning–Elmira, New York; United States
- City: Corning, New York
- Channels: Digital: 14 (UHF); Virtual: 39
- Branding: MyTV WJKP-TV

Programming
- Affiliations: 39.1: Independent with MyNetworkTV

Ownership
- Owner: Coastal Television Broadcasting Company; (CTNY License LLC)
- Sister stations: WYDC

History
- First air date: January 9, 2003
- Former call signs: W39CP (2003–2006); WJKP-LP (2006–2010)
- Former channel numbers: Analog: 39 (UHF, 2003–2009); Digital: 39 (UHF, 2009–2021)

Technical information
- Licensing authority: FCC
- Facility ID: 128778
- Class: LD
- ERP: 3 kW
- HAAT: 234.2 m (768 ft)
- Transmitter coordinates: 42°8′31″N 77°4′39″W
- Translator(s): WYDC 48.2 Corning

Links
- Public license information: LMS

WJKP-LD (channel 39) is a low-power television station licensed to Corning, New York, United States, serving the Elmira area. It is programmed primarily as an independent station, but maintains a secondary affiliation with MyNetworkTV. WJKP-LD is owned by Coastal Television Broadcasting Company LLC alongside Fox affiliate WYDC (channel 48). The two stations share studios on East Market Street in Downtown Corning; WJKP-LD's transmitter is located on Higman Hill.

In addition to its own low-power digital signal, WJKP-LD also receives full-market over-the-air coverage on WYDC's second digital subchannel. This airs on channel 48.2 from the same Higman Hill transmitter.

Coastal acquired WYDC and WJKP-LD from Waypoint Media on January 4, 2022, as part of a larger transaction that saw nine stations be sold to Coastal for $36.9 million.
