= WYDC =

Television station in Corning, New York

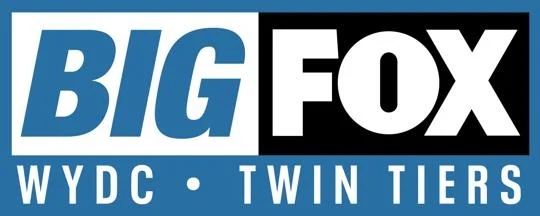

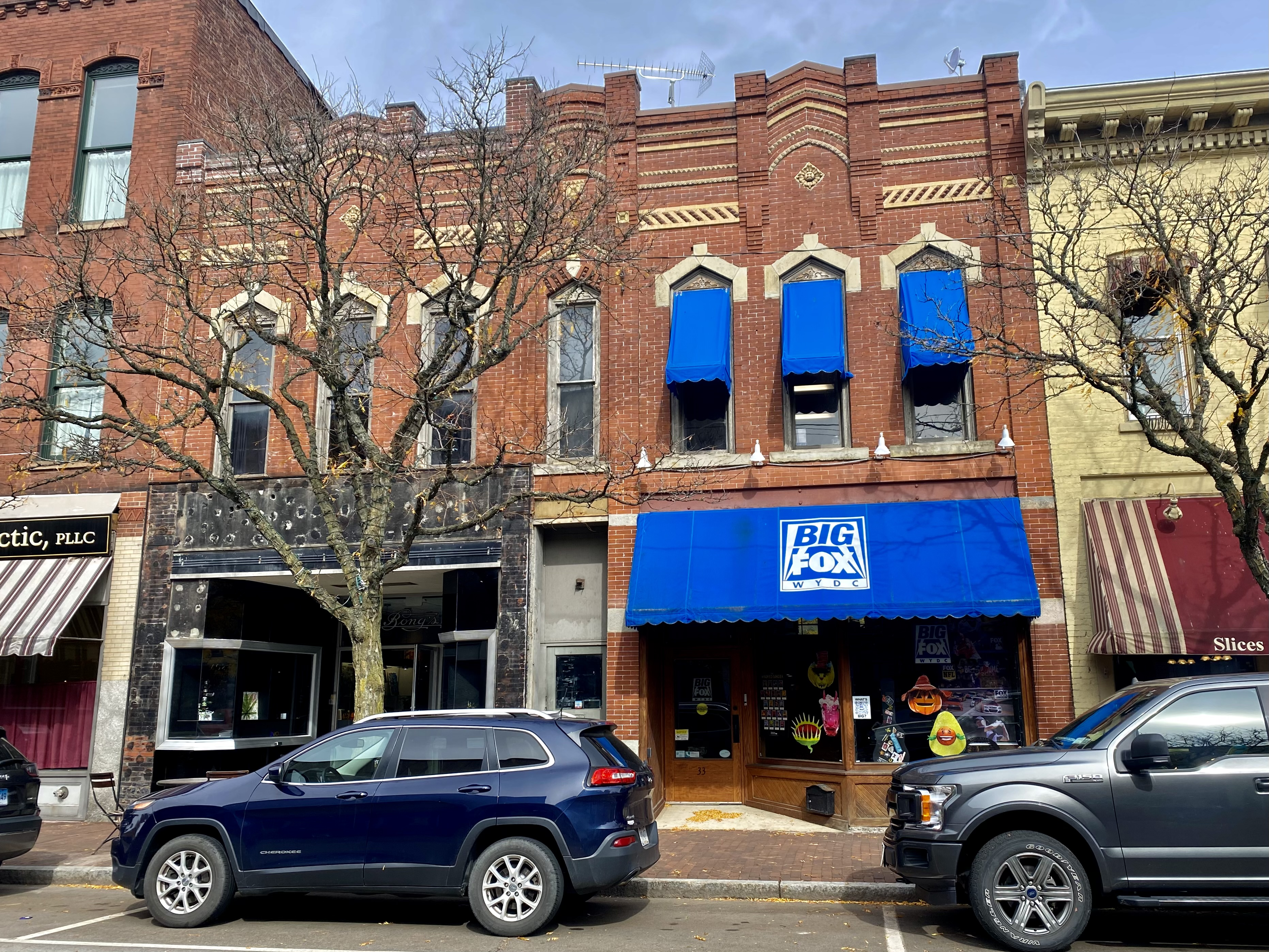
- WYDC studio building on Market Street in downtown Corning, as seen in October 2022.
- Corning–Elmira, New York; United States
- City: Corning, New York
- Channels: Digital: 30 (UHF); Virtual: 48
- Branding: Big Fox; Big Fox News; MyTV WJKP-TV (DT2)

Programming
- Affiliations: 48.1: Fox; 48.2: Independent with MyNetworkTV; for others, see § Subchannels

Ownership
- Owner: Coastal Television Broadcasting Company; (CTNY License LLC)
- Sister stations: WJKP-LD

History
- Founded: October 2, 1989
- First air date: September 6, 1994
- Former channel numbers: Analog: 48 (UHF, 1994–2009); Digital: 50 (UHF, 2001–2009), 48 (UHF, 2009–2019)
- Former affiliations: Independent (1994–1995); UPN (primary 1995–1997, secondary 1997–2004); The WB (secondary, 1995–1997)

Technical information
- Licensing authority: FCC
- Facility ID: 62219
- ERP: 55 kW
- HAAT: 311 m (1,020 ft)
- Transmitter coordinates: 42°8′31.2″N 77°4′38.8″W
- Translator(s): see § Translators

Links
- Public license information: Public file; LMS
- Website: wydc-tv.com

WYDC (channel 48) is a television station licensed to Corning, New York, United States, serving as the Fox affiliate for the Elmira area. It is owned by Coastal Television Broadcasting Company LLC alongside WJKP-LD (channel 39), an independent station with MyNetworkTV. The two stations share studios on East Market Street in Downtown Corning; WYDC's transmitter is located on Higman Hill.

== History ==
On June 9, 1988, the Federal Communications Commission (FCC) granted a construction permit to Rural New York Broadcasting, owned by Robert Walker of Albany, to build a new television station in Corning. In 1992, Walker moved to Florida and donated the permit to Cornerstone Television, a Christian broadcaster from Pittsburgh. Cornerstone never built the station, and instead it was Molly and David Grant, with investors known as Standfast Broadcasting, who put WYDC on the air in 1994 as independent "Big TV".

Big TV rapidly grew. It built translators in Elmira and Bath, became an affiliate of UPN and The WB in 1995, and added Fox in October 1996.

Vision Communications, headed by William Christian, leased the station with an option to buy in 1997 and moved to shift the station's focus to Fox, eliminating UPN and WB programs. The new ownership upgraded the facilities with a $2 million investment. The Grants went on to start another station known as Big TV, UPN affiliate WBGT-LP in Rochester, which Vision acquired in 2002.

Vision Communications filed to sell its broadcast properties to Standard Media in 2019. The sale was never consummated.

In July 2021, Waypoint Media and its related entity, Vision Communications, announced that they would sell nine of their television stations, including WYDC, WJKP-LD, and WECY-LD, to Cumming, Georgia–based Coastal Television for $36.9 million. The sale was completed on January 4, 2022.

The station airs a 10 p.m. weeknight newscast branded as Big Fox News at 10, using Coastal's partly-centralized News Hub from Little Rock, Arkansas.

== Technical information ==
=== Subchannels ===
WYDC's transmitter is located on Higman Hill. The station's signal is multiplexed:

Subchannels of WYDC
Subchannel	Res.	Short name	Programming
48.1	720p	WYDC	Fox
48.2	720p	WJKP	WJKP-LD (Independent with MyNetworkTV)
48.3	480i	MeTV	MeTV (4:3)
48.4	480i	Grit	Grit
48.5	480i	Bounce	Bounce TV
48.7	480i	Ion Plus	Ion Plus

Simulcast of subchannels of another station

=== Analog-to-digital conversion ===
WYDC shut down its analog signal, over UHF channel 48, on June 12, 2009, the official date on which full-power television stations in the United States transitioned from analog to digital broadcasts under federal mandate. The station's digital signal relocated from its pre-transition UHF channel 50 to channel 48.

=== Translators ===
In addition to its main signal, WYDC can also be seen on five low-power digital repeaters. WYDC was also formerly repeated on WMYH-LP in Elmira/Watkins Glen, which is no longer licensed.

- W19ET-D Bath
- W15EG-D Corning
- WECY-LD 19 Elmira
- W26BF-D Elmira
- W17ED-D Hornell–Alfred

== See also ==
- Channel 30 digital TV stations in the United States
- Channel 48 virtual TV stations in the United States
