= WNBJ-LD =

Television station in Jackson, Tennessee

- Jackson, Tennessee; United States
- Channels: Digital: 16 (UHF); Virtual: 39
- Branding: NBC 39; 39 News; West Tennessee's CW 39 (39.2); My H&I 39 (39.3)

Programming
- Affiliations: 39.1: NBC; 39.2: CW+; 39.3: H&I/MNTV

Ownership
- Owner: Coastal Television Broadcasting Company; (CTT License LLC)

History
- Founded: February 22, 2011
- First air date: October 6, 2014 (on Dish Network); November 6, 2014 (Over-the-air)
- Former call signs: W16DE-D (CP, 2011–2014)
- Call sign meaning: NBC Jackson

Technical information
- Licensing authority: FCC
- Facility ID: 185218
- Class: LD
- ERP: 15 kW
- HAAT: 78.5 m (258 ft)
- Transmitter coordinates: 35°36′11.3″N 88°47′52.2″W

Links
- Public license information: LMS
- Website: www.wnbjtv.com; "West Tennessee's CW 39" (LD2)

WNBJ-LD (channel 39) is a low-power television station in Jackson, Tennessee, United States, affiliated with NBC and The CW Plus. The station is owned by Coastal Television Broadcasting Company, and maintains studios on North Highland Avenue and a transmitter near the corner of Commerce and Iselin streets, both in downtown Jackson.

== History ==
Plans for an NBC affiliate in Jackson originated with the 2011 acquisition of former TBN repeater W35AH channel 35 from the Minority Media and Television Council (an organization designed to preserve equal opportunity and civil rights in the media) by New Moon Communications, as part of a package deal that also included former TBN repeaters in Dothan, Alabama; Jonesboro, Arkansas; and Ottumwa, Iowa. Of the four stations, only the Dothan station became NBC, but under different owners, as WRGX-LD. KJNE-LP in Jonesboro was sold to Waypoint Media, LLC of Meridian, Mississippi, owners of Fox/CBS affiliate KJNB-LD (and eventually became a satellite of that station), while the licenses in Ottumwa (KUMK-LP) and Jackson (whose transmitter would be re-called WZMC-LP) would later be canceled, with the Jackson station canceled in July 2013.

The history of WNBJ-LD originates with the station's construction permit granted in 2011, under the call sign W16DE-D. The current WNBJ-LD call letters replaced their previous translator-style call sign on July 9, 2014.

In September 2014, it was confirmed that WNBJ would sign on as an NBC affiliate for the Jackson market. WMC-TV in Memphis and WSMV in Nashville were previously the default NBC affiliates for the Jackson area using a very strong antenna, or through cable television. Some of the far northern parts of the local media market (e.g. northern Gibson County north of Trenton) could pick up WPSD in Paducah, Kentucky until the DTV transition for full-power stations took place in 2009.

On October 6, 2014, WNBJ went on the air first via Dish Network channel 6 at 11:30 a.m. CDT. OTA followed on November 6, 2014, and Direct TV in January 2015. The station was signed-on by a local group known as Jackson TV, LLC, who then entered into an outsourcing agreement with Waypoint Media to allow Waypoint to operate the station.

NBC was the last of the Big Four television networks to have a local outlet in Jackson. Currently, The Jackson Energy Authority's cable system still pipes in most of the major outlets in Memphis, including WMC-TV. CBS affiliate WTVF is the only Nashville-based media outlet offered on JEA's cable lineup, with WNBJ-LD replacing WSMV on cable channel 4.

WNBJ was the second television station in the Jackson market to sign on exclusively in digital, about eight to nine months after WYJJ-LD.

On February 23, 2016, the station's original owners agreed to merge WNBJ-LD's licensee with a subsidiary of SagamoreHill Broadcasting. The merger was completed on April 1.

In July 2021, Waypoint announced that it would sell nine of its television stations, including WNBJ-LD, to Cumming, Georgia—based Coastal Television for $36.9 million. The sale was completed on January 4, 2022.

=== Subchannel history ===
==== WNBJ-LD2 (CW+) ====
On August 6, 2018, a 720p HD feed (branded as "West Tennessee's CW 39") of The CW's national CW Plus service was added to subchannel 39.2, succeeding cable-only "WBJK" as the CW Plus affiliate for the Jackson, Tennessee market.

==== WNBJ-LD3 (H&I/MyTV) ====
In September 2019, the MyNetworkTV affiliation in Jackson, Tennessee moved to a secondary affiliation alongside H&I on the third subchannel of WNBJ-LD after WYJJ-LD (channel 27) became a fully automated station and its parent company ended all of its local programming efforts on its stations.

== Programming ==
=== News operation ===
WNBJ's news operation launched August 28, 2017, with newscasts produced by the Independent News Network in Little Rock, Arkansas, utilizing INN talent for all but local contributions. Lon Tegels, a 30-year veteran at various television stations, including WXXV-TV in Biloxi, Mississippi, became WNBJ's first news director. Reporters on the news team included Jackson Overstreet and Camila Rueda.

Waypoint Media purchased the Independent News Network's centralized news operation in June 2019 and renamed it to News Hub; News Hub was purchased by Coastal Television in July 2021.

As of 2018, WNBJ-LD aired 7½ hours of local newscasts, all weekdays at 6 p.m., 9 p.m. (on LD2) and 10 p.m.

=== Non-news programming ===
WNBJ airs a program called Exit82. Produced locally by Red Art Studios, it is a "concert/interview" format show that features "popular and up-and-coming musical talent from the Jackson and surrounding areas" who "perform original music". The program is named after I-40's interchange with US 45 in Jackson.

WNBJ also airs Harmony Road and Tennessee Gospel Show that showcases traditional and contemporary Christian music, and Vertical Descent, a local hunting show produced in Chester County.

== Technical information ==
=== Subchannels ===
The station's signal is multiplexed:

Subchannels of WNBJ-LD
Channel	Res.	Short name	Programming
39.1	1080i	NBC	NBC
39.2	720p	CW	The CW Plus
39.3	480i	Mynet	H&I & MyNetworkTV

== Coverage area ==
WNBJ is a low-power television station with 15,000 watts of power; the station's signal gives WNBJ a coverage area comprising most of the Jackson market, or 94,110 television households, and the far eastern portion of the Memphis market. The Jackson market consists of viewers living in Carroll, Chester, Gibson, Hardin, Henderson, and Madison counties in West Tennessee. WNBJ's signal also covers parts of Crockett, Hardeman, Haywood, northern Fayette, and McNairy counties in the Memphis market. Hardin County is the only area within WNBJ's home market that is out of its broadcast range, though it is possible for local cable systems to receive the signal by alternate means, such as a fiber-optic connection or via Dish or DirecTV.
