= KJNB-CD =

Television station in Jonesboro, Arkansas

KJNB-CD and K22PF-D
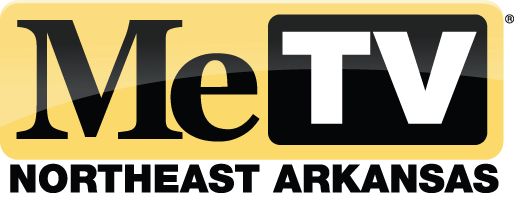

Jonesboro, Arkansas; United States
- Channels for KJNB-CD: Digital: 16 (UHF); Virtual: 39
- Channels for K22PF-D: Digital: 22 (UHF); Virtual: 42
- Branding: KJNB Northeast Arkansas Fox (39.1/42.1); KJNB Northeast Arkansas CBS (39.2/42.2); MeTV Northeast Arkansas (39.3/42.3–primary); MyNetworkTV Northeast Arkansas (39.3/42.3–secondary); Northeast Arkansas News (newscasts)

Programming
- Affiliations: 39.1/42.1: Fox; 39.2/42.2: CBS; 39.3/42.3: MeTV/MyNetworkTV

Ownership
- Owner: Coastal Television Broadcasting Company LLC; (CTA License LLC)

History
- Founded: KJNB-CD: November 22, 2011; K22PF-D: December 19, 1994
- First air date: KJNB-CD: June 1, 2015; K22PF-D: December 19, 1994 (original incarnation); September 6, 2017 (current incarnation)
- Last air date: K22PF-D: c. 2010 (original incarnation)
- Former call signs: KJNB-CD: K39LS-D (2011–2014); KJNB-LD (2014–2025); K22PF-D: K54ER (1994–2005); K42GX (2005–2011); KJNE-LP (2011–2017); KJNE-LD (2017–2026)
- Former channel number: KJNB-CD: Digital: 39 (UHF, 2011–2018), 27 (UHF, 2018–2021); K22PF-D: Analog: 54 (UHF, 1994–2005), 42 (UHF, 2005–2017); Digital: 42 (UHF, 2017–2018)
- Former affiliations: KJNB-CD: Dark (2011–2015); K22PF-D: TBN (1994–2010)
- Call sign meaning: KJNB-CD: Jonesboro

Technical information
- Licensing authority: FCC
- Facility ID: KJNB-CD: 187271; K22PF-D: 60836
- Class: KJNB-CD: CD; K22PF-D: LD
- ERP: 15 kW
- HAAT: KJNB-CD: 106.4 m (349 ft); K22PF-D: 167 m (548 ft)
- Transmitter coordinates: KJNB-CD: 36°03′30″N 90°56′36″W; K22PF-D: 35°53′27″N 90°40′26″W

Links
- Public license information: KJNB-CD: Public file; LMS; K22PF-D: Public file; LMS
- Website: www.kjnbtv.com

KJNB-CD (channel 39) is a low-power, Class A television station in Jonesboro, Arkansas, United States, affiliated with Fox, CBS and MyNetworkTV. Owned by Coastal Television Broadcasting Company LLC, the station maintains a small office in the Regions Bank Building on East Highland Drive in Jonesboro. Its transmitter is located on Highway 91/Southern Avenue in unincorporated Lawrence County, southeast of Walnut Ridge, with translator K22PF-D (formerly KJNE-CD) broadcasting into Jonesboro proper from a tower on County Road 730 north of Jonesboro.

== History ==
=== KJNB-CD history ===
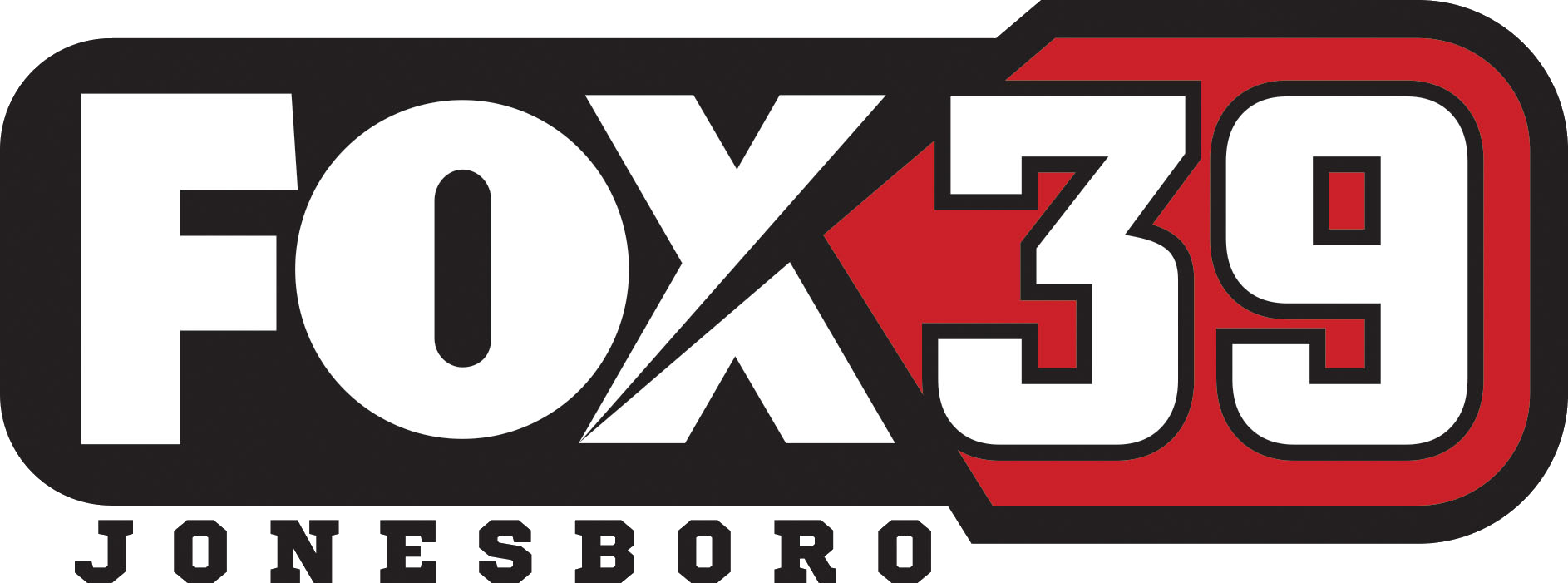
Logo used from June 1, 2015, until November 2, 2017.

The station first signed on the air on June 1, 2015, as the market's second commercial television station, after ABC/NBC affiliate KAIT (channel 8), which signed on the air in July 1963 as an independent station. Until this point, Fox programming was available in northeast Arkansas over-the-air and on cable through WHBQ-TV (channel 13) in Memphis, Tennessee (prior to the former owner Fox Television Stations' purchase and subsequent affiliation switch of WHBQ in 1995, area cable systems previously piped in that station's predecessor affiliates: WMKW-TV [channel 30, now CW affiliate WLMT] from 1987 to 1990, and WPTY-TV [channel 24, now ABC affiliate WATN-TV] from 1990 until it lost the Fox affiliation to WHBQ). Despite being licensed as a low-powered television station, Waypoint Media secured the affiliation agreement with Fox by promising to provide coverage of at least 93% of the market through its over-the-air signal and through distribution on local cable and satellite providers.

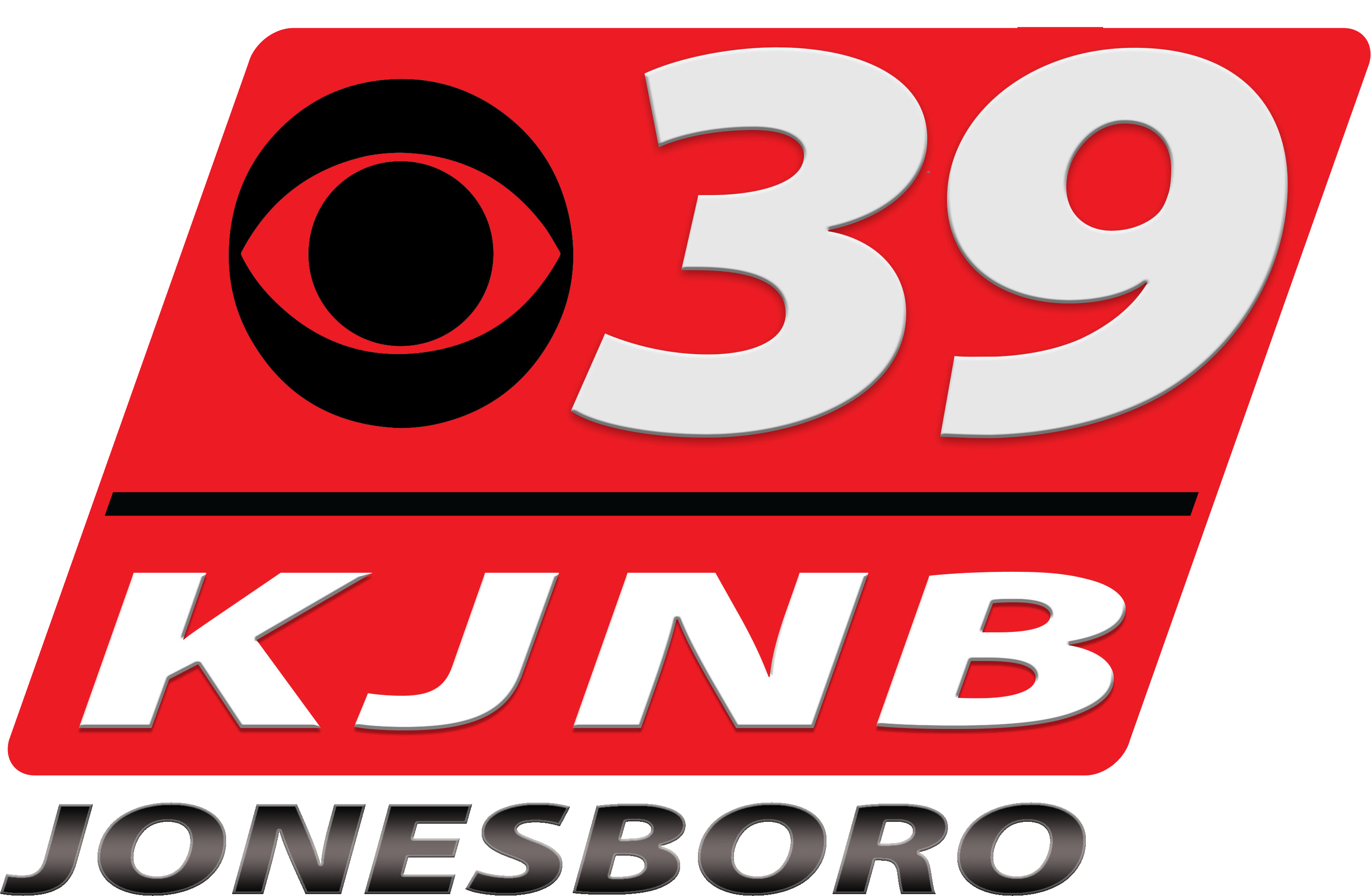
Logo used from September 1, 2015, until November 2, 2017.

On August 1, 2015, KJNB-LD signed on a second digital subchannel, carrying programming from CBS (as the Jonesboro area's first locally based CBS affiliate). Previously, the default CBS affiliates were KTHV in Little Rock, KOLR in Springfield, Missouri, and WREG-TV in Memphis over the air and on cable, as well as KFVS-TV in Cape Girardeau, Missouri, via DirecTV. The station also announced plans to sign on KJNE-LP as a satellite station to expand the station's coverage.

On September 1, 2015, KTHV was replaced with KJNB-LD2 on the Jonesboro area Suddenlink cable system, but WREG remains on the lineup.

=== KJNE-LD / K22PF-D history ===
==== As a TBN translator ====
KJNE-LD was previously K54ER channel 54 and later, K42GX; during both instances, the station served as an owned-and-operated repeater of the Trinity Broadcasting Network, with all programming retransmitted from a satellite feed. K27FC, a defunct low-power station, also served as a TBN translator. In 2010, TBN closed down many of its low-powered repeaters due to ongoing economic problems. Many of these repeaters would be donated by TBN to the Minority Media and Television Council (MMTC), an organization designed to preserve equal opportunity and civil rights in the media.

==== As a silent station ====
The MMTC would later sell K42GX, along with three other translators in three other markets to New Moon Communications. They were WZMC-LP in Jackson, Tennessee, WDON-LP in Dothan, Alabama, and KUMK-LP in Ottumwa, Iowa. New Moon had the intent to convert them to NBC affiliates. After the transaction, on June 14, 2011, K42GX changed the station's callsign to KJNE-LP. The intent of KJNE-LP was to bring a local NBC affiliate to the small Jonesboro market. NBC was available locally on cable via either WMC-TV in Memphis, KYTV-TV in Springfield, or KARK-TV in Little Rock. For decades, WMC-TV serves as the default NBC station for Jonesboro.

In September 2012, New Moon placed all its stations (including KJNE) up for sale. Jackson's WZMC-LP and Ottumwa's KUMK-LP had their licenses canceled at New Moon's request, while WDON-LP (now WRGX-LD) in Dothan signed on as an NBC affiliate after its sale to Gray Television. However, WNBJ-LD, another station unrelated to WZMC-LP, signed on in the Jackson, Tennessee, area to serve as an NBC affiliate for the market in October 2014. This was followed on January 24, 2018, by the relaunch of Fox affiliate KYOU-TV's second subchannel as the new NBC affiliate for the Ottumwa area.

==== Foiled plan for an NBC affiliation ====
Four days after Christmas Day 2014, it was announced that KAIT, the ABC affiliate in the Jonesboro area, would begin broadcasting NBC programming on a subchannel on January 26, 2015. NBC was already taken, but plans for KJNE to become affiliated with any network were still all but terminated. Of the four stations New Moon Communications acquired in 2011, KJNE was the only station still under New Moon's ownership and with an active license.

==== Satellite and translator of KJNB-CD ====
In June 2015, Waypoint Media announced that it would be acquiring KJNE-LP. On July 29, 2015, Waypoint Media announced in a press release that KJNE-LP would serve as a satellite and translator of KJNB-LD when it returned to the air, with Fox programming airing on 42.1 and CBS airing on 42.2.

The station was issued its license for digital operation on September 6, 2017, at which point it changed its call sign to KJNE-LD.

In July 2021, Waypoint announced that they would sell nine of its television stations, including KJNB-LD and KJNE-LD, to Cumming, Georgia–based Coastal Television for $36.9 million. The sale was completed on January 4, 2022.

In March 2026, the FCC changed the callsign of KJNE-LD to K22PF-D as part of a rule change requiring all translators to use standard translator callsigns.

== KJNB-CD3 (MeTV & MyNetworkTV) ==
In addition to Fox and CBS programming, KJNB-LD operates the Jonesboro market's MeTV affiliate on its LD3 subchannel. On weeknights, KJNB-LD3 also carries programs from the MyNetworkTV programming service, filling in programming for all time slots outside of the MyNetworkTV programming schedule with the MeTV schedule. There is now local branding (via a separate logo) indicating this subchannel's secondary MyNetworkTV affiliation status, as well as network promotions and a mention of it on the schedule listings section of the station website and in the TV Lineup listings within the Ritter Communications website. In 2015, the MyNetworkTV website listed K30MF-D to become the MyNetworkTV affiliate for the Jonesboro area in the near future; however, the addition of the programming service to KJNB-LD3 (and at the time, KJNE-LD3) on September 3, 2018, means that Waypoint Media, LLC (not DTV America Corporation/HC2 Holdings) picked up the MyNetworkTV affiliation in the Jonesboro market. Prior to September 3, 2018, the default MyNetworkTV affiliates in Jonesboro were KPMF-LD of Memphis, Tennessee, and WDKA of Paducah, Kentucky.

== News operation ==
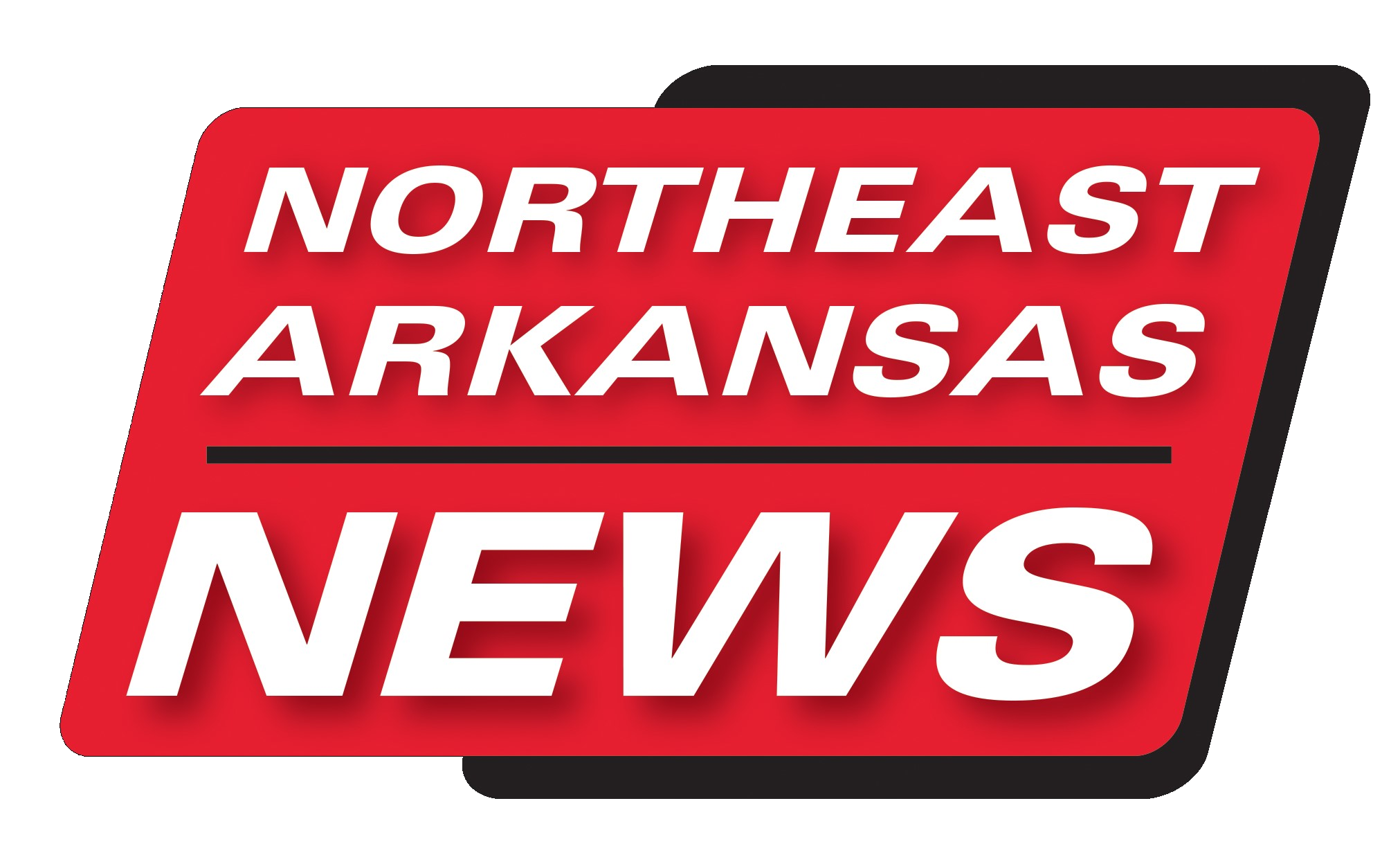
Logo of Northeast Arkansas News (which has been used since the July 17, 2017, launch of the station's news department).

The station's news department launched July 17, 2017, under the branding of Northeast Arkansas News. Prior to that, neither its Fox nor CBS subchannel broadcast local news, choosing instead to air syndicated programming. As of 2017, KJNB-LD/KJNE-LD aired 7½ hours of local newscasts each week, all on weekdays. The newscasts aired at 6 and 10 p.m. on the CBS subchannel and at 9 p.m. on the Fox subchannel.

Lon Tegels, a 30-year veteran at various television stations, including WXXV-TV in Biloxi, Mississippi, became KJNB's first news director. Sarah Blakely became the station's inaugural news anchor, broadcasting from a Waypoint-owned studio in Little Rock, airing segments from Jonesboro-based reporters Simone Jameson and Alexis Padilla. Blakely also anchored similar newscasts on sister stations WPBI-LD and WPBY-LD in Lafayette, Indiana. Waypoint Media's centralized news operation, known as News Hub since June 2019, was purchased by Coastal Television in July 2021.

== Subchannels ==
The stations' digital signals are multiplexed:

Subchannels of KJNB-CD and K22PF-D
Channel		Res.	Short name	Programming
KJNB-CD	K22PF-D	Res.	Short name	Programming
39.1	42.1	720p	KJNB	Fox
39.2	42.2	1080i	CJNB	CBS
39.3	42.3	480i	Metv	MeTV/MyNetworkTV
