= List of television stations in Wyoming =

This is a list of broadcast television stations that are licensed in the U.S. state of Wyoming.

== Full-power ==
- Stations are arranged by media market served and channel position.

Full-power television stations in Wyoming
Media market	Station	Channel	Primary affiliation(s)	Notes	Refs
Casper	KTWO-TV	2	ABC		
Casper	KPTW	6	PBS		
Casper	KCWY-DT	13	NBC, The CW on 13.2		
Casper	KGWC-TV	14	CBS, ABC on 14.2		
Casper	KFNB	20	Fox, MyNetworkTV on 20.2		
Cheyenne	KGWN-TV	5	CBS, NBC on 5.2, The CW on 5.3		
Cheyenne	KWYP-DT	8	PBS	(Note: Licensed to Laramie, Wyoming.)	
Cheyenne	KLWY	27	Fox, ABC on 27.2		
Cheyenne	KQCK	33	CTN		
Lander	KCWC-DT	4	PBS		
Lander	KGWL-TV	5	CBS, ABC on 5.2	(Note: Satellite of KGWC-TV.)	
Lander	KFNE	10	Fox, ABC on 10.2	(Note: Licensed to Riverton, Wyoming.) (Note: Satellite of KFNB.)	
Rawlins	KFNR	11	Fox, ABC on 11.2		
Sheridan	KSGW-TV	12	ABC, NBC on 12.2	(Note: Satellite of KHME.) (Note: Satellite of KOTA-TV.)	
Southwest Wyoming	KGWR-TV	13	CBS, ABC on 13.2	(Note: Licensed to Rock Springs, Wyoming.)	

== Low-power ==
Low-power television stations in Wyoming
Media market	Station	Channel	Primary affiliation(s)	Notes	Refs
Casper	K22MC-D	49	IBN Television		
Cheyenne	KKTQ-LD	16	ABC	(Note: Semi-satellite of KTWO-TV.)	
Cheyenne	KXCY-LD	18	Various		
Cheyenne	KGSC-LD	33	Religious independent		
Jackson	K24OE-D	24	Spanish independent		
Southwest Wyoming	K33IX-D	33	IBN Television		
Shoshoni	K30GV-D	30	Cozi TV		

== Translators ==
Television station translators in Wyoming
Media market	Station	Channel	Translating	Notes	Refs
Casper	K16IO-D	4	KCWC-DT	(Note: Licensed to Chugwater, Wyoming.)	
Casper	K18JJ-D	4	KCWC-DT	(Note: Licensed to Crowheart, Wyoming.)	
Casper	K29JO-D	4	KCWC-DT	(Note: Licensed to Douglas, Wyoming.)	
Casper	K24MK-D	4	KCWC-DT	(Note: Licensed to Glenrock, Wyoming.)	
Casper	K19FX-D	5	KGWN-TV		
Casper	K16JI-D	13	KCWY-DT		
Casper	KCBZ-LD	13	KCWY-DT		
Casper	K11RN-D	14	KGWC-TV		
Casper	K09XL-D	20	KFNB		
Casper	KWYF-LD	20	KFNB		
Cheyenne	K21HQ-D	8	KWYP	(Note: Licensed to Glendo, Wyoming.)	
Cheyenne	K36JO-D	8	KWYP		
Cheyenne	K10FQ-D	31	KDVR	(Note: Licensed to Big Laramie, Wyoming.)	
Jackson	K16LM-D	4	KCWC-DT	(Note: Licensed to Teton Village, Wyoming.)	
Jackson	K19FG-D	4	KCWC-DT		
Jackson	K29HG-D	8	KIFI-TV		
Jackson	K36JD-D	8	KIFI-TV		
Lander	K22CI-D	2	KTWO-TV		
Lander	K16LT-D	4	KCWC-DT	(Note: Licensed to Dubois, Wyoming.)	
Meeteetse	K21JU-D	2	KTVQ		
Meeteetse	K19KW-D	4	KCWC-DT	(Note: Licensed to Greybull, Wyoming.)	
Meeteetse	K29IH-D	4	KCWC-DT		
Meeteetse	K31JO-D	4	KCWC-DT	(Note: Licensed to Wood River, Wyoming.)	
Meeteetse	K17KC-D	8	KULR-TV		
Northern Wyoming	K14RF-D	2	KTVQ	(Note: Licensed to Cody, Wyoming.)	
Northern Wyoming	K20LT-D	2	KTVQ	(Note: Licensed to Diamond Basin, Wyoming.)	
Northern Wyoming	K30OU-D	2	KTWO-TV		
Northern Wyoming	K02LH-D	4	KCWC-DT	(Note: Licensed to Clarks Fork, Wyoming.)	
Northern Wyoming	K29IG-D	4	KCWC-DT	(Note: Licensed to Sunlight Basin, Wyoming.)	
Northern Wyoming	K19LM-D	4	KCWC-DT		
Northern Wyoming	K23IX-D	4	KCWC-DT	(Note: Licensed to Clark, Wyoming.)	
Northern Wyoming	K27OU-D	4	KCWC-DT	(Note: Licensed to Lovell, Wyoming.)	
Northern Wyoming	K29HV-D	4	KCWC-DT	(Note: Licensed to La Barge, Wyoming.)	
Northern Wyoming	K32IF-D	4	KCWC-DT	(Note: Licensed to North Fork, Wyoming.)	
Northern Wyoming	K25OV-D	8	KULR-TV		
Rawlins	K15MP-D	4	KCWC-DT		
Rawlins	K19MG-D	4	KCWC-DT		
Sheridan	K09KX-D	2	KTVQ		
Sheridan	K15HK-D	4	KCWC-DT		
Sheridan	K19GX-D	4	KCWC-DT	(Note: Licensed to Buffalo, Wyoming.)	
Sheridan	K25NI-D	4	KCWC-DT	(Note: Licensed to Wright, Wyoming.)	
Sheridan	K26NL-D	4	KCWC-DT	(Note: Licensed to Gillette, Wyoming.)	
Sheridan	WRDY607	4	KCWC-DT	(Note: Licensed to Jim Creek, Wyoming.)	
Sheridan	KOPA-CD	12	KOTA-TV		
Sheridan	K16AE-D	14	KGWC-TV		
Sheridan	K26LW-D	14	KGWC-TV		
Sheridan	K30MX-D	14	KGWC-TV	(Note: Licensed to Wyodak, Wyoming.)	
Sheridan	K22AD-D	21	KNBN		
Shoshoni	K26OM-D	2	KTWO-TV		
Shoshoni	K35CV-D	2	KTWO-TV		
Shoshoni	K22NJ-D	4	KCWC-DT	(Note: Licensed to Lucerne, Wyoming.)	
Shoshoni	WQQB533	4	KCWC-DT	(Note: Licensed to Copper Mountain, Wyoming.)	
Shoshoni	K24MJ-D	5	KGWL-TV		
Shoshoni	K28HL-D	13	KCWY-DT		
Shoshoni	K13NZ-D	14	KGWC-TV		
Southwest Wyoming	K07HM-D	2	KTWO-TV	(Note: Licensed to Big Piney, Wyoming.)	
Southwest Wyoming	K16CS-D	2	KTWO-TV	(Note: Licensed to Pinedale, Wyoming.)	
Southwest Wyoming	K16NU-D	4	KCWC-DT	(Note: Licensed to Mountain View, Wyoming.)	
Southwest Wyoming	K17NG-D	4	KCWC-DT	(Note: Licensed to Sage Junction, Wyoming.)	
Southwest Wyoming	K19HJ-D	4	KCWC-DT		
Southwest Wyoming	K23DS-D	4	KCWC-DT	(Note: Licensed to Evanston, Wyoming.)	
Southwest Wyoming	K28JU-D	4	KCWC-DT		
Southwest Wyoming	K33JQ-D	4	KCWC-DT		
Southwest Wyoming	K36OU-D	4	KCWC-DT		
Southwest Wyoming	K10HO-D	5	KSL-TV		
Southwest Wyoming	K22IY-D	5	KSL-TV		
Southwest Wyoming	K16HW-D	7	KUED		
Southwest Wyoming	K17JZ-D	13	KGWR-TV	(Note: Licensed to Bondurant, Wyoming.)	
Southwest Wyoming	K18JA-D	14	KGWR-TV		
Southwest Wyoming	K32JN-D	14	KGWC-TV		
Southwest Wyoming	K27KV-D	30	KUCW		
Southwest Wyoming	K31FW-D	30	KUCW	(Note: Licensed to Lyman, Wyoming.)	
Thayne	(729498)	2	KTWO-TV	(Note: Licensed to Freedom, Wyoming.)	
Thayne	K33DS-D	2	KTWO-TV		
Thayne	K05GJ-D	3	KIDK		
Thayne	K31DC-D	4	KCWC-DT		
Thayne	K12LI-D	6	KPVI-DT		
Thayne	K07PB-D	8	KIFI-TV		
~Soda Springs, ID	K24GT-D	4	KCWC-DT	(Note: Licensed to Kemmerer, Wyoming.)	
~Scottsbluff, NE	K18JD-D	4	KCWC-DT	(Note: Licensed to Torrington, Wyoming.)	
~Rapid City, SD	K15KM-D	4	KCWC-DT	(Note: Licensed to Sundance, Wyoming.)	
~Rapid City, SD	K15II-D	4	KCWC-DT	(Note: Licensed to Newcastle, Wyoming.)	
~Rapid City, SD	K31LF-D	4	KCWC-DT	(Note: Licensed to Clareton, Wyoming.)	
~Rapid City, SD	K28KM-D	14	KGWC-TV		

== Defunct ==
- KBEO Jackson (2001–2010)
- KJCW Sheridan (2002–2010)
- KSPR-TV Casper (1957–1959)
