= Channel 33 digital TV stations in the United States =

The following television stations broadcast on digital channel 33 in the United States:

- K23KR-D in Alton, Utah
- K33AC-D in Pawnee City, Nebraska
- K33AF-D in Ninilchik, Alaska
- K33CP-D in Gold Beach, Oregon
- K33DB-D in Alexandria, Minnesota
- K33DO-D in Vernal, Utah, on virtual channel 9, which rebroadcasts KUEN
- K33DR-D in Montpelier, Idaho
- K33DS-D in Freedom-Etna, Wyoming
- K33EA-D in Columbus, Montana
- K33EB-D in Cedar Canyon, Utah
- K33EJ-D in Walla Walla, Washington
- K33ER-D in Verdi/Mogul, Nevada
- K33FF-D in Wallace, etc., Nebraska
- K33FI-D in Akron, Colorado, on virtual channel 9, which rebroadcasts KUSA
- K33FK-D in Angel Fire, New Mexico
- K33FL-D in Las Vegas, New Mexico
- K33FO-D in Benkelman, Nebraska
- K33FS-D in La Grande, Oregon
- K33FT-D in Manti/Ephraim, Utah, on virtual channel 7, which rebroadcasts KUED
- K33FX-D in Heber/Midway, Utah, on virtual channel 7, which rebroadcasts KUED
- K33FY-D in Park City, Utah, on virtual channel 30, which rebroadcasts KUCW
- K33GA-D in Grants/Milan, New Mexico
- K33GB-D in Golconda, Nevada
- K33GC-D in Capulin, etc., New Mexico
- K33GF-D in Preston, Idaho, on virtual channel 3, which rebroadcasts KIDK
- K33GJ-D in Merlin, Oregon
- K33GM-D in Haxtun, Colorado, on virtual channel 31, which rebroadcasts KDVR
- K33GX-D in Springfield, South Dakota
- K33GZ-D in Hawthorne, Nevada
- K33HG-D in Quanah, Texas
- K33HH-D in Redding, California
- K33HO-D in Soda Springs, Idaho
- K33HX-D in Tropic & Cannonville, Utah
- K33HY-D in Basalt, Colorado
- K33IB-D in Silver Springs, Nevada
- K33ID-D in Ridgecrest, California, on virtual channel 13, which rebroadcasts KCOP-TV
- K33IM-D in Malad City, Idaho
- K33IW-D in Coaldale, Colorado
- K33IX-D in Rock Springs, Wyoming
- K33IY-D in Le Chee, etc., Arizona, on virtual channel 7, which rebroadcasts KUED
- K33IZ-D in Boulder, Utah
- K33JE-D in Modena/Beryl, etc., Utah
- K33JG-D in Peoa/Oakley, Utah
- K33JI-D in Scofield, Utah
- K33JM-D in Mooreland, etc., Oklahoma
- K33JQ-D in Big Piney, etc., Wyoming
- K33JW-D in Rockville/Springdale, Utah
- K33KD-D in London Springs, Oregon
- K33KE-D in Sargents, Colorado, on virtual channel 4, which rebroadcasts K04DH-D
- K33KF-D in Kanarraville, etc., Utah
- K33KH-D in Nephi, Utah, on virtual channel 9, which rebroadcasts KUEN
- K33KI-D in Spring Glen, Utah
- K33KJ-D in Crested Butte, Colorado, on virtual channel 13, which rebroadcasts K13AV-D
- K33KV-D in Lamar, Colorado
- K33KW-D in Delta, etc., Utah
- K33LA-D in Duchesne, Utah, on virtual channel 7, which rebroadcasts KUED
- K33LB-D in Redwood Falls, Minnesota, on virtual channel 4, which rebroadcasts WCCO-TV
- K33LG-D in Bridger, etc., Montana
- K33LN-D in Minneapolis, Minnesota, on virtual channel 33
- K33LV-D in Henefer, etc., Utah
- K33LW-D in Sandpoint, Idaho
- K33LZ-D in Myrtle Point, Oregon
- K33MC-D in Forsyth, Montana
- K33MD-D in Yuma, Arizona
- K33MI-D in Aberdeen, South Dakota
- K33MJ-D in Pahrump, Nevada
- K33MN-D in Jefferson City, Missouri
- K33MW-D in Mankato, Minnesota
- K33NM-D in Omak, etc., Washington
- K33NP-D in Russell, Kansas
- K33NT-D in Kanab, Utah
- K33NV-D in Strong City, Oklahoma
- K33NX-D in Carlsbad, New Mexico
- K33NY-D in Roseburg, Oregon
- K33NZ-D in Cottonwood, Arizona
- K33OB-D in Roswell, New Mexico
- K33OD-D in Kingman, Arizona
- K33OE-D in Penasco, New Mexico
- K33OG-D in Max, Minnesota
- K33OH-D in Ferndale, etc., Montana
- K33OI-D in Hanksville, Utah
- K33OJ-D in Garfield, etc., Utah
- K33OK-D in Overton, Nevada
- K33OL-D in Fremont, Utah
- K33OM-D in Caineville, Utah
- K33ON-D in Fort Peck, Montana
- K33OO-D in Antimony, Utah
- K33OP-D in Helena, Montana
- K33OQ-D in Escalante, Utah
- K33OR-D in St. Ignatius, Montana
- K33OT-D in Willmar, Minnesota
- K33OU-D in Fountain Green, Utah
- K33OV-D in Whitehall, Montana
- K33OW-D in Neligh, Nebraska
- K33OX-D in Samak, Utah
- K33OY-D in Blanding/Monticello, Utah
- K33OZ-D in Parowan, Enoch, etc., Utah
- K33PA-D in Sterling, Colorado, on virtual channel 47, which rebroadcasts K21NZ-D
- K33PB-D in Grand Junction, Colorado
- K33PC-D in Santa Clara, Utah, on virtual channel 30, which rebroadcasts KUCW
- K33PD-D in Toquerville, Hurricane, Utah, on virtual channel 9, which rebroadcasts KUEN
- K33PE-D in Truth or Consequences, New Mexico
- K33PF-D in Beaver, etc., Utah
- K33PG-D in Socorro, New Mexico
- K33PH-D in Garrison, etc., Utah
- K33PI-D in Eureka, Nevada
- K33PJ-D in Emery, Utah
- K33PK-D in Green River, Utah
- K33PL-D in Birchdale, Minnesota
- K33PM-D in Grants Pass, Oregon
- K33PN-D in Ferron, Utah
- K33PO-D in Clear Creek, Utah
- K33PQ-D in Manila, etc, Utah
- K33PR-D in Joplin, Montana
- K33PS-D in Randolph, Utah
- K33PU-D in Yuma, Colorado, on virtual channel 47, which rebroadcasts K21NZ-D
- K33PV-D in Rock Rapids, Iowa
- K33PX-D in Clarendon, Texas
- K33PZ-D in Julesburg, Colorado, on virtual channel 51, which rebroadcasts K16NJ-D
- K33QB-D in Coolin, Idaho
- K33QC-D in Window Rock, Arizona
- K33QD-D in Zuni Pueblo, New Mexico
- K33QF-D in Holbrook, Idaho
- K33QG-D in Cortez, etc., Colorado
- K33QH-D in San Angelo, Texas
- K33QL-D in Snowmass Village, Colorado
- K33QP-D in Corpus Christi, Texas
- K33QS-D in Santa Barbara, etc., California
- K33QU-D in Jacks Peak, New Mexico
- KBAK-TV in Bakersfield, California
- KBFD-DT in Honolulu, Hawaii
- KBIN-TV in Council Bluffs, Iowa
- KBSE-LD in Boise, etc., Idaho, an ATSC 3.0 station.
- KCCF-LD in Atascadero, California
- KCPN-LD in Amarillo, Texas
- KCWO-TV in Big Spring, Texas
- KDFX-CD in Indio/Palm Springs, California
- KDGU-LD in Ulysses, Kansas
- KDLH in Duluth, Minnesota
- KDMD in Anchorage, Alaska
- KEMY-LD in Eureka, California
- KFTS in Klamath Falls, Oregon
- KGEW-LD in Port Arthur, Texas
- KGKC-LD in Lawrence, Kansas, on virtual channel 39
- KGSC-LD in Cheyenne, Wyoming
- KHMF-LD in Fort Smith, Arkansas
- KHSB-LD in Steamboat Springs, Colorado, on virtual channel 33
- KIMA-TV in Yakima, Washington
- KJEO-LD in Fresno, California
- KJTV-CD in Lubbock, Texas
- KKPX-TV in San Jose, California, on virtual channel 65
- KLPA-TV in Alexandria, Louisiana
- KMSX-LD in Sacramento, California
- KNPB in Incline Village, Nevada
- KNWA-TV in Rogers, Arkansas
- KOCB in Oklahoma City, Oklahoma
- KQHD-LD in Hardin, Montana
- KQSX-LD in Cal - Oregon, California
- KQZY-LD in Victoria, Texas
- KRCW-TV in Salem, Oregon, an ATSC 3.0 station, on virtual channel 32
- KRMA-TV in Denver, Colorado, on virtual channel 6
- KRPC-LP in Rapid City, South Dakota
- KRTN-TV in Durango, Colorado
- KSCW-DT in Wichita, Kansas
- KSSJ-LD in San Antonio, Texas
- KSUD-LD in Salt Lake City, Utah, on virtual channel 33
- KTBN-TV in Santa Ana, California, on virtual channel 40
- KTBU in Conroe, Texas, on virtual channel 55
- KTVI in St. Louis, Missouri, on virtual channel 2
- KTVO in Kirksville, Missouri
- KTVW-DT in Phoenix, Arizona, on virtual channel 33
- KUOC-LD in Enid, Oklahoma
- KUVN-DT in Garland, Texas, on virtual channel 23
- KVUE in Austin, Texas
- KVVB-LD in Lucerne Valley, California
- KWPX-TV in Bellevue, Washington, on virtual channel 33
- W33DH-D in Eau Claire, Wisconsin
- W33DN-D in Florence, South Carolina
- W33EB-D in Olive Hill, Tennessee
- W33ED-D in Vieques, Puerto Rico
- W33EG-D in Lumberton, Mississippi
- W33EH-D in Black Mountain, North Carolina
- W33EI-D in Raleigh, North Carolina, on virtual channel 46
- W33EJ-D in Moorefield, West Virginia
- W33EL-D in Caguas, Puerto Rico
- W33EM-D in Pittsburgh, Pennsylvania
- W33EP-D in Key West, Florida
- W33ER-D in Augusta, Georgia
- W33ET-D in New York, New York
- W33EU-D in Athens, Georgia
- W33EV-D in Waycross, Georgia
- WCAC-LD in Lagrange, Georgia
- WCCT-TV in Waterbury, Connecticut, an ATSC 3.0 station, on virtual channel 20
- WCVB-TV in Boston, Massachusetts, on virtual channel 5
- WDFX-TV in Ozark, Alabama
- WDTV in Weston, West Virginia
- WFMJ-TV in Youngstown, Ohio
- WFRZ-LD in Montgomery, Alabama
- WGCT-LD in Tampa, Florida, on virtual channel 19
- WGNM in Macon, Georgia
- WGRZ in Buffalo, New York
- WHIO-TV in Dayton, Ohio
- WHUT-TV in Washington, D.C., on virtual channel 32
- WILT-LD in Wilmington, North Carolina
- WIRE-CD in Atlanta, Georgia, on virtual channel 33
- WJAN-CD in Miami, Florida, on virtual channel 41
- WJGC-LD in Jacksonville, North Carolina
- WJWN-TV in San Sebastian, Puerto Rico, on virtual channel 38
- WKAR-TV in East Lansing, Michigan
- WKHA in Hazard, Kentucky
- WKXT-LD in Knoxville, Tennessee
- WLAX in La Crosse, Wisconsin
- WLXI in Greensboro, North Carolina
- WMAQ-TV in Chicago, Illinois, on virtual channel 5
- WNBD-LD in Grenada, Mississippi
- WNGS-LD in Greenville, South Carolina
- WNGX-LD in Schenectady, New York
- WNXG-LD in Tallahassee, Florida, an ATSC 3.0 station.
- WOCW-LD in Charleston, West Virginia
- WOFL in Orlando, Florida, on virtual channel 35
- WOHO-CD in Holland, Michigan
- WOKZ-CD in Kalamazoo, Michigan
- WOWZ-LD in Salisbury, Maryland
- WPCT in Panama City Beach, Florida
- WPDP-CD in Cleveland, Tennessee
- WPGD-TV in Hendersonville, Tennessee, on virtual channel 50
- WPSG in Philadelphia, Pennsylvania, on virtual channel 57
- WPXH-TV in Hoover, Alabama
- WPXL-TV in New Orleans, Louisiana
- WPXX-TV in Memphis, Tennessee
- WQHI-LD in Myrtle Beach, South Carolina
- WQIZ-LD in Ashland, Ohio
- WQPX-TV in Scranton, Pennsylvania
- WRLK-TV in Columbia, South Carolina
- WRXY-TV in Tice, Florida
- WSNS-TV in Chicago, Illinois, uses WMAQ-TV's spectrum, on virtual channel 44
- WTIU in Bloomington, Indiana, on virtual channel 30
- WTNG-CD in Lumberton-Pembroke, North Carolina
- WTSG-LD in Tifton, Georgia
- WTVZ-TV in Norfolk, Virginia
- WUJF-LD in Jacksonville, Florida
- WUNL-TV in Winston-Salem, North Carolina
- WVVC-LD in Utica, New York
- WWHB-CD in Stuart, Florida
- WXCK-LD in Chiefland, Florida

The following stations, which are no longer licensed, formerly broadcast on digital channel 33:

- K33BN in Taos, New Mexico
- K33CF-D in Wellington, Texas
- K33CQ-D in Canadian, Texas
- K33JB-D in Orderville, Utah
- K33LF-D in Lewiston, Montana
- K33OS-D in Granite Falls, Minnesota
- K33PW-D in Moses Lake, Washington
- K33PY-D in Round Mountain, Nevada
- KKOM-LD in Lufkin, Texas
- KMAS-LD in Denver, Colorado
- KTDS-LD in Ted's Place, Colorado
- WBXG-LD in Gainesville, Florida
- WUCU-LD in Evansville, Indiana
