= KKTQ-LD =

Television station in Cheyenne, Wyoming

Semi-satellite of KTWO-TV, Casper, Wyoming

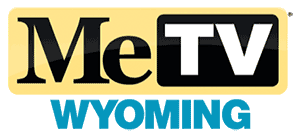
- Cheyenne, Wyoming; United States
- Channels: Digital: 16 (UHF); Virtual: 16
- Branding: ABC 16 KKTQ Cheyenne; Me-TV Wyoming (16.2); Your Wyoming Link (newscasts)

Programming
- Affiliations: 16.1: ABC; 16.2: MeTV

Ownership
- Owner: Vision Alaska Television Holdings; (VW License LLC)
- Operator: Coastal Television Broadcasting Company LLC via SSA
- Sister stations: KLWY

History
- First air date: February 22, 2011
- Former call signs: K16JM-D (2011–2013)
- Call sign meaning: Reflects former KTWO satellite KKTU

Technical information
- Licensing authority: FCC
- Facility ID: 185075
- Class: LD
- ERP: 1 kW
- HAAT: 53 m (174 ft)
- Transmitter coordinates: 41°8′55″N 104°57′24″W

Links
- Public license information: LMS
- Website: yourwyominglink.com

KKTQ-LD (channel 16) is a low-power television station in Cheyenne, Wyoming, United States, affiliated with ABC. The station is owned by Vision Alaska LLC, which operates Fox affiliate KLWY (channel 27) under a shared services agreement (SSA) with the Coastal Television Broadcasting Company. KKTQ-LD's transmitter is located on Happy Jack Road (WYO 210) west of the city.

Although identifying as a station in its own right, KKTQ-LD is considered a semi-satellite of ABC affiliate KTWO-TV (channel 2) in Casper. As such, it simulcasts all network and syndicated programming as provided by its parent, but airs separate station identifications and commercials. In addition, it shares a website with KTWO, KLWY, KGWC and KFNB (the latter two are the CBS and Fox affiliates in Casper, respectively), and also it airs newscasts produced by KLWY.

KKTQ-LD's low-power broadcast radius does not cover the entire Cheyenne–Scottsbluff television market. As such, it is simulcast in 480i widescreen standard definition on the second digital subchannel of KLWY in order to reach the entire market.

== History ==
=== KKTU/KDEV (1987–2006) ===
KTWO had two previous satellites in Cheyenne. The first, KKTU (channel 33), had signed on in 1987 when KTWO was still an NBC affiliate and owned by Dix Communications. Both stations were sold in 1994 to Eastern Broadcasting for $13 million. KTWO and KKTU were temporarily affiliated with The WB in 1995. The late 1990s saw many ownership changes for the two stations. In 1997, Grapevine Communications bought the two stations among others for $40 million; Grapevine then merged with GOCOM Communications to form GOCOM Holdings two years later. In 2001, Equity Broadcasting bought KTWO-TV and KKTU from GOCOM for $3.5 million.

In September 2003, NBC's affiliation contract with KTWO and KKTU expired and the network signed a new agreement with then Pax TV (now Ion Television) affiliate KCWY-DT (channel 13). However, the two stations had affiliated with ABC three months earlier to prepare for the affiliation switch. But ABC still had an affiliation contract with KFNB that would not expire for about another year. KTWO and KCWY switched affiliations with Pax going to KTWO and NBC going to KCWY. KKTU, as a satellite, was able to immediately switch from NBC to ABC and began branding as "ABC 8", in reference to its cable channel in Cheyenne. On March 8, 2004, after long negotiations with KFNB, KTWO signed with ABC three months ahead of schedule while KFNB got a new affiliation with Fox. Fox was previously on K26ES (now low-powered dual MyNetworkTV/MeTV affiliate KWYF-LD, channel 20). K26ES then became affiliated with UPN and Pax.

Seven days earlier, Cheryl Kaupp, who controlled KTWO, began operating the station under a local marketing agreement with Equity. That October, Kaupp filed to acquire KTWO from Equity for $1.7 million. That created a triopoly between KTWO, KFNB, and KGWC. KFNB was owned by Kaupp's father, Marvin Gussman under Wyomedia Corporation; and KGWC was at the time being acquired by Mark III Media. Mark Nalbone, Wyomedia's general manager, owned a 30% interest in Mark III and served as a consultant to KTWO. In April 2004, Nalbone announced KTWO would move studios from 2nd Street to Skyview Drive in Casper; where it now shares operations with KFNB, KGWC, and KWYF-LD. In 2005, Silverton Broadcasting announced it would acquire KTWO-TV from Kaupp; the acquisition was completed on May 31, 2006. KKTU, however, was left behind with Equity. It changed its callsign to KDEV in 2005, but KTWO was still allowed to operate it. KDEV then dropped ABC in favor of programming from the Retro Television Network in 2006.

=== K40HP/KKTU-LP/KDEV-LP (2006–2012) ===
On March 15, 2004, KTWO signed on low-power repeater K40HP (channel 40). It was later renamed KKTU-LP on October 4, 2004; it didn't sign on until 2007. KDEV then began simulcasting ABC programming over its analog signal and the second channel on its digital signal on June 8, 2008. On June 24, 2008, the callsign of KKTU-LP changed to KDEV-LP after KDEV changed its callsign to KQCK on June 17. On June 27, an equipment failure at KQCK's analog facilities caused ABC programming to start being broadcast on KDEV-LP. KQCK was then sold to Valley Bank by auction for $7 million on April 16, 2009; then it was resold to Fusion Communications on September 9. By this time, KTWO moved KDEV-LP's ABC programming to KLWY's second digital subchannel and converted KDEV-LP to MyNetworkTV in 2010, then to MeTV in 2011. KQCK was then converted to the short-lived Spanish-language network VasalloVision in 2010 and MundoFox in 2012 before becoming a Christian Television Network affiliate in 2014. KQCK was then acquired by CTN in 2017. KDEV-LP was shut down in 2012. The station never converted to digital.

=== K16JM-D/KKTQ-LD (2012–present) ===
On February 21, 2011, about a year and a half before KDEV-LP was shut down, KTWO signed on yet another low-power repeater in Cheyenne, this time in digital. K16JM-D got all ABC programming from KLWY's second subchannel; it still is rebroadcast on the subchannel as of 2022. The callsign was changed to KKTQ-LD on June 5, 2013.

Silverton Broadcasting announced KTWO and KKTQ-LD would be sold to Legacy Broadcasting on February 8, 2018, and could have created a duopoly with KFNB, as it was in the process of being acquired from WyoMedia and it was the fifth-ranked station in the Casper market. The sale was canceled six months later.

On October 8, 2019, Silverton announced that it would sell KTWO-TV and KKTQ-LD to Vision Wyoming, a subsidiary of Vision Alaska (run by Stephen Brisette); the sale was concurrent with Big Horn Television's purchase of KGWC-TV and Coastal Television Broadcasting Company's purchase of KFNB and KLWY. Coastal Television (run by Bill Fielder) and Vision Alaska already jointly operated stations in Alaska and Mississippi. The sale was completed on June 1, 2020. Shortly afterwards, the news department was significantly downsized, and weekend newscasts were replaced by programming from Michigan-based NewsNet. On July 3, KTWO radio reported that KTWO-TV's morning newscast, Good Morning Wyoming, would be replaced by a new morning show on July 6, and that the station's other newscasts would incorporate NewsNet content, with local reports primarily seen at the start of newscasts. Coastal Television's Alaska stations had moved to a NewsNet-based model the preceding April; in a June 28 interview with KTWO radio, Fielder said that the shift to NewsNet had been accelerated by the coronavirus pandemic. Coastal later blamed the cutbacks on difficulties in achieving the economies of scale needed to maintain a full newsroom in rural areas, and in July 2021 cited this as the reason it was purchasing most of the broadcast assets of Waypoint Media, another small rural broadcaster. By April 2022, NewsNet was dropped in favor of the Coastal-owned and partly-centralized News Hub, recently acquired from Waypoint Media.

== Programming ==
KKTQ-LD clears the entire ABC schedule as well as syndicated programming provided by KTWO. However, it airs different station identifications and commercials. It also re-airs KLWY's newscasts at 10 p.m.

== Technical information ==
=== Subchannels ===
The station's signal is multiplexed:

Subchannels of KKTQ-LD
Channel	Video	Short name	Programming
16.1	720p	KKTQ HD	ABC
16.2	480i	MeTV	MyNetworkTV / MeTV (KWYF-LD)

Simulcast of subchannels of another station

The MeTV-affiliated subchannel is a simulcast of KLWY's third subchannel, which in turn is a simulcast of KWYF-LD (channel 20) in Casper.
