= KLWY =

Television station in Cheyenne, Wyoming

Semi-satellite of KFNB, Casper, Wyoming
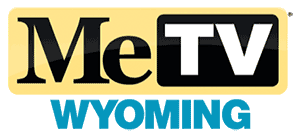
- Cheyenne, Wyoming; Scottsbluff, Nebraska; United States
- City: Cheyenne, Wyoming
- Channels: Digital: 27 (UHF); Virtual: 27
- Branding: Fox 27 KLWY Cheyenne; ABC 16 KKTQ Cheyenne (DT2); Me-TV Wyoming (DT3); "Your Wyoming Link" (newscasts)

Programming
- Affiliations: 27.1: Fox; 27.2: ABC; 27.3: MyNetworkTV/MeTV; for others, see § Subchannels

Ownership
- Owner: Coastal Television Broadcasting Company LLC; (FRTV License LLC)
- Sister stations: KKTQ-LD

History
- First air date: August 5, 1994
- Former affiliations: UPN (secondary, 1995–2006)
- Call sign meaning: Laramie County, Wyoming

Technical information
- Licensing authority: FCC
- Facility ID: 40250
- ERP: 169 kW
- HAAT: 232 m (761 ft)
- Transmitter coordinates: 41°3′0.5″N 104°53′33.5″W

Links
- Public license information: Public file; LMS
- Website: yourwyominglink.com

KLWY (channel 27) is a television station in Cheyenne, Wyoming, United States, affiliated with the Fox network. The station is owned by Coastal Television Broadcasting Company LLC, and maintains a transmitter southwest of Cheyenne along I-25.

KLWY is a semi-satellite of KFNB (channel 20), the Fox affiliate in Casper. The two stations air nearly the same programming with separate station identifications and commercials, and are operated from KFNB's studios on Skyview Drive in Casper.

== History ==
KLWY signed on August 5, 1994, as the third full-fledged commercial station in eastern Wyoming following KGWN-TV in 1954 and KQCK in 1987. It immediately joined Fox; previously, Denver's KDVR was carried by some cable providers in southeastern Wyoming, but much of the eastern portion of the state did not receive Fox programming at all as this was one of the few areas of the country where cable was not yet readily available. It took 13 years for KLWY to launch; the construction permit had been issued August 4, 1981, to the Chrysostom Corporation, which owned Casper's KCWY-TV (channel 14). It then was sold in 1983 to Heart of Wyoming Television, which was the original owner of Casper's channel 20 (when it was KXWY-TV). Wyomedia, which became the owner of the Casper station in the early 1990s, then acquired KLWY in 1992.

KLWY carried a secondary affiliation with UPN until the network closed in September 2006.

Until 2004, KLWY's programming was simulcast on K26ES in Casper and K11RN in Douglas. Wyomedia converted these two stations into full-time UPN affiliates in 2004, then to CW affiliates after UPN's closure. K26ES is now K27PT-D, an affiliate of MyNetworkTV and MeTV; its programming is simulcast in Cheyenne on the third subchannel of KLWY.

KLWY made the switch to digital on February 17, 2009.

KLWY did not air its own newscasts per se, however it utilized NewsNet for a 9 p.m. local broadcast; the only other newscast on the station was a rebroadcast of Good Morning Wyoming from KTWO-TV in Casper. However, KTWO's programming, including ABC programming and its newscasts, are simulcast on a digital subchannel of KLWY.

Wyomedia Corporation agreed to sell its stations to Legacy Broadcasting on February 8, 2018; the sale was canceled on October 2, 2018. On October 8, 2019, Wyomedia announced that it would sell its stations to Front Range Television, a subsidiary of Coastal Television Broadcasting Company (run by Bill Fielder); the sale was concurrent with Vision Alaska's purchase of KKTQ-LD (channel 16). Coastal Television and Vision Alaska (run by Stephen Brissette) already jointly operated stations in Alaska. The sale was completed on June 1, 2020.

By April 2022, NewsNet was dropped in favor of the Coastal-owned and partly-centralized News Hub, recently acquired from Waypoint Media.

== Technical information ==
=== Subchannels ===
The station's digital signal is multiplexed:

Subchannels of KLWY
Channel	Res.	Short name	Programming
27.1	720p	KLWY	Fox
27.2	480i	KKTQ	ABC (KKTQ-LD)
27.3	480i	MeTV	MyNetworkTV/MeTV (KWYF-LD)
27.4	480i	ION	Ion
27.5	480i	COZI	Cozi TV
27.6	480i	LAFF	Laff
27.7	480i	ION PLU	Ion Plus

Simulcast of subchannels of another station

KLWY originally signed on a digital signal at channel 28, and took part of the mandatory digital conversion on February 18, 2009, where it flash cut its analog signal. After the transition, KLWY returned to its position on channel 27, where it remains today. The station was quick to add KTWO as KKTQ, after KDEV-LP lost its ABC affiliation, and MeTV came shortly afterwards. In 2019, KLWY signed on its fourth subchannel as Ion Television; followed by the fifth subchannel in January 2021 as Cozi TVl and two additional subchannels (TrueReal and Defy TV) in July 2021, bringing the total up to seven, the highest in Wyoming.

=== Translator ===
City of license	Callsign	Channel	ERP	HAAT	Facility ID	Transmitter coordinates
Scottsbluff, NE	K09YH-D	9	0.5 kW	−8 m (−26 ft)	167559	41°51′43.8″N 103°39′39.7″W
