= Fox 10 =

Fox 10 may refer to one of the following television stations in the United States affiliated with the Fox Broadcasting Company:

== Current ==
- KBIM-DT2, a digital channel of KBIM-TV in Roswell, New Mexico
  - Satellite of KRQE-DT2 in Albuquerque, New Mexico
- KBRR in Grand Forks, North Dakota
  - Satellite of KVRR in Fargo, North Dakota
- KFNE in Riverton, Wyoming
  - Satellite of KFNB in Casper, Wyoming
- KMOT-DT2, a digital channel of KMOT in Minot, North Dakota
- KSAZ-TV in Phoenix, Arizona (O&O)
- WABG-DT2 in Greenwood, Mississippi (cable channel; broadcasts on channel 32)
- WALA-TV in Mobile, Alabama
- WGEM-DT3, a digital channel of WGEM-TV in Quincy, Illinois
- WTHI-DT2, a digital channel of WTHI-TV in Terre Haute, Indiana
- WVFX-TV in Clarksburg, West Virginia

== Former ==
- KIDY in San Angelo, Texas (broadcasts on channel 6; Fox 10 was its former branding via cable channel number from 1998 to 2007)
- KMTF (now KUHM-TV) in Helena, Montana (1998–2001)
