= Fox 9 =

Fox 9 may refer to one of the following television stations in the United States affiliated with the Fox Broadcasting Company:

- KECY-TV in Yuma, Arizona–El Centro, California
- KMSP-TV in Minneapolis, Minnesota (O&O)
- KNIN-TV in Caldwell–Boise, Idaho KFNR in Rawlins, Wyoming, a satellite of KFNB in Casper, Wyoming
- WTOV-DT2, a digital subchannel of WTOV-TV in Steubenville, Ohio / Wheeling, West Virginia
- WTVC-DT2, a digital subchannel of WTVC in Chattanooga, Tennessee
