= CBS 6 =

CBS 6 may refer to one of the following television stations in the United States:

- KAUZ-TV in Wichita Falls, Texas
- KBSD-DT in Dodge City, Kansas
  - Semi-satellite of KWCH-DT in Wichita, Kansas
- KFDM in Beaumont–Port Arthur, Texas
- KOIN in Portland, Oregon
- KOTV-DT in Tulsa, Oklahoma
- WCTV in Thomasville, Georgia–Tallahassee, Florida
- WKMG-TV in Orlando, Florida
- WLNS-TV in Lansing–Jackson, Michigan
- WRGB in Albany, New York
- WTVR-TV in Richmond, Virginia

== Formerly affiliated ==
- KCMC-TV (now KTAL-TV) in Texarkana, Texas–Shreveport, Louisiana (1953–1961)
- KMOS-TV in Sedalia, Missouri (1961–1978)
- KREZ-TV in Durango, Colorado (1963–2026)
  - Satellite of KRQE in Albuquerque, New Mexico
- KSPR-TV in Casper, Wyoming (1957–1959)
- KVIQ-LD in Eureka, California (1958–2008, now on channel 14)
- WCIX (now WFOR-TV) in Miami, Florida (1989–1995; now on channel 4)
- WDSM-TV (now KBJR-TV) in Superior, Wisconsin–Duluth, Minnesota (1954–1955)
- WFBM-TV (now WRTV) in Indianapolis, Indiana (1949–1956)
- WITI in Milwaukee, Wisconsin (1959–1961 and 1977–1994)
- WLNE-TV in Providence, Rhode Island (1977–1995)
