= KFNE =

Television station in Riverton, Wyoming

Satellite of KFNB and KTWO-TV, Casper, Wyoming

- Riverton, Wyoming; United States
- Channels: Digital: 10 (VHF); Virtual: 10
- Branding: Fox 20 KFNB Casper; ABC 2 KTWO Casper (10.2); Your Wyoming Link (newscasts)

Programming
- Affiliations: 10.1: Fox; 10.2: ABC

Ownership
- Owner: Front Range Television; (FRTV License LLC)

History
- First air date: December 22, 1957
- Former call signs: KWRB-TV (1957–1980); KTNW (1980–1984); KFWY-TV (1984–1986)
- Former affiliations: NBC (1957–1986, partial 1957–1980 and 1984–1986); CBS (partial, 1957–1980); ABC (partial, 1957–1980, primary 1986–2004)
- Call sign meaning: First National Entertainment (abortive owner in the late 1980s)

Technical information
- Licensing authority: FCC
- Facility ID: 21613
- ERP: 11.3 kW
- HAAT: 526 m (1,726 ft)
- Transmitter coordinates: 43°27′25.8″N 108°12′4.3″W

Links
- Public license information: Public file; LMS

KFNE (channel 10) is a television station in Riverton, Wyoming, United States, owned by Front Range Television LLC, a subsidiary of Coastal Television Broadcasting Company. The station's transmitter is located atop Boysen Peak northeast of Riverton. It operates as a full-time satellite of Fox affiliate KFNB in Casper, and airs commonly managed Casper ABC affiliate KTWO-TV on its second digital channel.

While KFNE is currently a satellite station, it operated on its own between 1957 and 1984. For most of that time, the station was based in Thermopolis, though the city of license was always Riverton. In 1984, principals involved with this station started channel 20 at Casper, which the Riverton station has relayed ever since.

== History ==
=== KWRB-TV ===
Channel 10 began broadcasting December 22, 1957, as KWRB-TV. It was originally owned by Mildred V. and Joseph P. Ernst, doing business as Chief Washakie TV. The Ernsts owned multiple stations in different cities in central Wyoming, including Thermopolis, Riverton, and Worland. Described as the "first small-town TV station" in the United States, KWRB-TV carried programs from all three major networks.

Operating a television station in a rural and rugged region such as the Bighorn Basin was difficult. Unable to afford a network feed, it relied on a microwave link to KOOK-TV (now KTVQ) in Billings, Montana. KTWO-TV in Casper, which had signed on in August, did not cooperate; the Ernsts blamed boosters of that station for hindering channel 10. They also blamed early cable systems for importing distant signals and undermining the station's advertising base, an issue also being experienced by other stations in the Mountain West. The venture was not profitable, having lost $60,000 in 1958. The Ernsts successfully fought efforts to provide signals by microwave to local cable systems on the grounds that they would adversely impact KWRB-TV's financial condition.

However, Wyoming's harsh winters represented the station's most significant operating challenge. From December to April, an engineer had to live atop Boysen Peak because snowdrifts blocked the road to the site. A November 1959 storm shattered a large window at the transmitter building, filling it with snow and rocks, while winds lifted part of the roof off. In 1961, an engineer returning to the mountain after having dental work performed in town went missing and was found by police, his station wagon having skidded into a snowbank. Less than a year later, two men supplying the site with butane gas had to walk the final two miles (3 km) to the top when their truck stalled. In 1963, a plane carrying unrelated personnel to the top of the mountain crashed in −17 °F (−27 °C) conditions, and the occupants took shelter at the transmitter site, the only shelter in a radius of 18 miles (29 km).

=== Sale and operation as KTNW ===
In the late 1970s, citing age and health, the Ernsts put their last broadcast holdings, KWRB-TV and KRTR radio at Thermopolis, on the market. A deal was reached in January 1978 to sell KWRB-TV to Strang Telecasting for $650,000. However, a petition to deny filing from Associated Christian Broadcasters delayed approval of the sale; having not been concluded in a year, the Ernsts canceled the contract and sought another buyer. Strang sued the Ernsts, who won a unanimous decision in May 1980 from the Wyoming Supreme Court upholding their action.

KWRB-TV continued to operate, though the danger inherent in operating a television station in such a rugged region remained. In 1979, an engineer living at the Boysen Peak site was attempting to repair equipment when he was electrocuted; the station did not find out until it failed to sign on the next morning.

In early 1980, the Ernsts found a buyer in Hi Ho Broadcasting, which purchased KWRB-TV for $700,000 in March 1980 and also bought WDHN-TV in Dothan, Alabama, at the same time. The new owners moved aggressively to improve the station. The call letters were changed to KTNW on June 1, 1980; plans were made to move the main studios from Thermopolis to Riverton and double the station's power; and a channel 20 translator at Casper was activated on August 12, 1980. The new translator doubled channel 10's viewership at one stroke. As one era began, another ended: the next day, Mildred V. Ernst died at the age of 79.

Between 1980 and 1984, the station was an exclusive NBC affiliate.

=== As a satellite of KXWY-TV/KFNB ===
Catherine Malatesta, one of the part-owners of KTNW, was also part-owner of Casper Channel 20, Inc., which held a construction permit for a new channel 20 station at Casper. When that station began operations on October 31, 1984, as KXWY-TV, it merged with Hi Ho, which had changed channel 10's call letters to KFWY-TV that June.

In 1986, KXWY-TV became the exclusive ABC affiliate for the Casper market. In time for the network change, and evidently reflecting the station's planned future ownership by First National Broadcasting, a subsidiary of film and television producer First National Entertainment—KXWY-TV and its satellite stations became KFNB, KFNE (in Riverton) and KFNR (in Rawlins) in August 1986.

The First National sale collapsed in April 1989 when the company defaulted on a loan secured with the station's equipment, leaving KFNB and its satellites off air for nine months. While the company never acquired KFNB itself, First National ended up with new licenses to replace those held by Casper Channel 20. Wyomedia Corporation, which had owned KFNB since 1990, acquired the pair in 2007 for $30,000 in total debt forgiveness.

KFNB became a secondary affiliate of Fox in 1994, airing prime time programming in off hours and its Sunday football games. As the result of an affiliation shuffle in Casper, KFNB and its satellites became a full-time Fox affiliate on March 8, 2004.

=== Sale attempt and completed sale ===
Wyomedia Corporation agreed to sell its stations to Legacy Broadcasting on February 8, 2018. The deal would have created a duopoly between KFNB and KTWO-TV, which Legacy would have concurrently acquired from Silverton Broadcasting Company; in its filing with the Federal Communications Commission (FCC), Legacy stated that the duopoly was permissible because KFNB was the fifth-ranked station in the Casper–Riverton market, trailing sister station KWYF-LD as well as KTWO, KCWY-DT, and KGWC-TV. The sale was canceled on October 2, 2018.

On October 8, 2019, Wyomedia announced that it would sell its stations to Front Range Television, a subsidiary of Coastal Television Broadcasting Company (run by Bill Fielder); the sale was concurrent with Big Horn Television's purchase of KGWC-TV and Vision Alaska's purchase of KTWO-TV. Coastal Television and Vision Alaska (run by Stephen Brissette) already jointly operated stations in Alaska. The sale was completed on June 1, 2020.

== Subchannels ==
The station's signal is multiplexed:

Subchannels of KFNE
Subchannel	Res.	Short name	Programming
10.1	720p	KFNE	Fox
10.2	480i	KTWO	ABC (KTWO-TV) (4:3)

Simulcast of subchannels of another station
