= Midco =

American telecommunications company

- Formerly: Midcontinent Communications
- Company type: Joint venture
- Industry: Telecommunications
- Founded: 1931; 95 years ago, in Minneapolis, Minnesota
- Headquarters: Sioux Falls, South Dakota
- Area served: Minnesota; North Dakota; South Dakota; Wisconsin; Northeast Kansas
- Key people: Pat McAdaragh (CEO)
- Products: Cable television; internet; telephone; fiber-optic
- Owners: Midcontinent Media (51%); Comcast (49%)
- Website: www.midco.com

Midco (known as Midcontinent Communications until 2016) is a regional cable provider, providing a triple play service of cable television, Internet and telephone service for both North Dakota and South Dakota, along with much of Minnesota, and several communities in Kansas and Wisconsin. The company's business-class service also provides direct fiber-optic communications services via leased data circuits for larger companies.

Headquartered in Sioux Falls, South Dakota and operated as a joint venture between Midcontinent Media and Comcast, Midco provides service to 200 communities both urban and rural, serving an area that covers over 1.2 million people.

== History ==
Midcontinent Media was founded in Minneapolis, Minnesota in 1931 as the Welworth Theater Company, an operator of movie theaters. The company remained in that business until the 1990s, when it sold its theaters to various chains, including Carmike. In 1952, it bought the Midcontinent Broadcasting Company, owner of KELO-AM-FM in Sioux Falls; the company name changed to Midcontinent Media. The company also bought the construction permit for South Dakota's first television station, KELO-TV, which took to the air in 1953. Midcontinent purchased several other radio and television stations, but began exiting broadcasting in the 1990s (with KELO-TV and its satellites sold off to Young Broadcasting, currently owned by Nexstar), selling off the last of their radio holdings in 2004.

Midco diversified and extended its reach into other areas of the Upper Midwest, providing telephone and cable TV in rural parts of its service area, starting in the 1960s. In 1999, Midcontinent Media and AT&T Broadband (formerly known as TCI) merged their cable operations in the Dakotas, Minnesota and Nebraska into Midcontinent Communications, a joint venture between both companies. The partnership continued after Comcast's purchase of AT&T Broadband.

In the fall of 2008, Charter Communications announced their filing for Chapter 11 bankruptcy protection and the sale of some assets in non-critical areas. On October 14, 2008, an article appeared in the Fairmont, Minnesota Sentinel, reporting that Charter was selling parts of their system to Midcontinent Communications, including its Bemidji and International Falls headends. Starting February 1, 2009 Midcontinent Communications took over some Charter's cable systems in Minnesota including Balaton, Bemidji, Canby, Ely, Fairmont, International Falls, Littlefork, Sherburn, and surrounding communities. Other areas in Minnesota were sold off to Comcast.

In June 2011, Midcontinent Communications acquired 33,000 Minnesota and Wisconsin subscribers from US Cable.

Midco previously provided paging service, starting in 1985, but sold its paging services to another South Dakota company, Vantek Communications, in 2004. The former paging service was renamed Midco Connections.

On January 12, 2016, the company officially adopted the shortened Midco name across all of their operations, rendering it in all-caps as "MIDCO", with the new tagline of "Let's Go".

In October 2016, Midco acquired the assets of the cable system serving Lawrence, Kansas from Wide Open West.

In November 2025, Midco acquired the assets of the cable systems serving east central and northern Minnesota from SCI Broadband(Savage Communications, Inc).

== Midco Sports ==
Midco offers a regional sports network called Midco Sports (formerly MC23 and Midco Sports Network (MidcoSN)) which carries coverage of NCAA Division I athletics in the Summit League, Missouri Valley Football Conference, and Central Collegiate Hockey Association with a specific focus on member schools South Dakota, South Dakota State University, North Dakota, and Augustana University. Additionally, Midco Sports is the primary broadcast partner for the NCAA Division II Northern Sun Intercollegiate Conference providing coverage of conference tournament basketball events.

Midco Sports's signature coverage comes each February and March with full coverage of the NSIC Men's and Women's Basketball Tournaments from the Sanford Pentagon in Sioux Falls. The network broadcasts each game from the quarterfinals on to the championships in its entirety. In addition, Midco televises the Summit League Men's and Women's tournament quarterfinals and semifinals from the Denny Sanford Premier Center. The network does not carry the championship games for those tournaments, as those rights are held by CBS Sports.

Midco Sports and its overflow channel, Midco Sports 2, are available on to all MIDCO cable customers along with other cable systems in the region through distribution deals.

Midco Sports employs over 30 full-time on-air talent and behind-the-scenes staffers.

On Friday, April 21, 2023, a Minnesota Twins game aired on the network due to a conflict on Bally Sports North.
