= Wyoming PBS =

PBS member network in Wyoming, United States

- Wyoming; United States
- Channels: Virtual: 4, 8, 6

Programming
- Subchannels: xx.1: PBS; xx.2: Create; xx.3: PBS Kids

Ownership
- Owner: Central Wyoming College

History
- First air date: May 27, 1983 (Note: Wyoming PBS celebrates its launch on May 10, the date in 1983 when it first broadcast a signal, though regular programming did not begin until May 27, 1983.)
- Former names: Wyoming Public Television

Links
- Website: wyomingpbs.org
- For technical information, see § Transmitters.

Wyoming PBS is the statewide public broadcaster for the U.S. state of Wyoming. A member of PBS, it is owned and operated by Central Wyoming College and originates from its campus on Peck Avenue in Riverton. Three high-power transmitters—KCWC-DT (channel 4) in Lander, KWYP-DT (channel 8) in Laramie, and KPTW (channel 6) in Casper—and 40 low-power translator stations broadcast the signal across the state.

Wyoming was the second-to-last state to receive a public television station. While efforts to bring educational television to Wyoming dated to the 1950s, state legislators on multiple occasions refused to fund proposed statewide educational stations or networks. Central Wyoming College, which already had a radio and television instruction program, moved forward with building its own station. It received a construction permit for KCWC-TV in December 1981 and began broadcasting on May 27, 1983.

Over the succeeding decades, KCWC-TV's signal slowly expanded by way of low-power translators in the rest of Wyoming, in conjunction with the state's cable providers. More ambitious expansion plans were curtailed by budget cuts. In the 2000s, it added higher-power transmitters to serve Casper and Laramie. Compared to other PBS member stations/networks, Wyoming PBS has limited availability on direct broadcast satellite. This is due to the network's reliance on translators and how most counties are assigned to out-of-state media markets such as Denver and Salt Lake City.

Wyoming PBS is funded by viewer contributions as well as state and college support. It produces local programming pertaining to Wyoming public affairs, culture, and nature.

== History ==
=== Educational television proposals pre-1981 ===
Only one actual educational reserved channel was allotted to Wyoming, channel 8 at Laramie—home to the University of Wyoming. As early as 1951, the university was interested in filing to use the channel, but it had to wait until Wyoming's biennial legislature convened in 1953 to obtain permission. However, Wyoming legislators refused permission; the projected costs of establishing a proposed full-power educational station in Laramie were higher than those for launching what would be the state's first commercial station, KFBC-TV in Cheyenne. That station's principal owner, Tracy McCraken, was one of the university's trustees. In 1961, Casper's school board applied for the use of channel 6—an unused commercial channel. Later that year, governor Jack Gage expressed interest in activating the Laramie channel at a time when commercial interests in Scottsbluff, Nebraska, sought to have the channel moved there for their use. Senator Gale McGee protested the possible substitution of channel 11 at Laramie because station spacing restrictions prevented that channel from serving Cheyenne as well.

By 1965, commercial station KTWO-TV in Casper was airing the only educational programs on Wyoming television, and the Community Television cable system imported KRMA-TV from Denver. In late 1964, the Casper school board filed another application for channel 6. Soon, the locus of activity shifted to a committee formed by governor Clifford Hansen, which authorized a study and applied for channels 6 in Casper and 8 in Laramie in December 1965. Hansen's successor, Stan Hathaway, signed a law in February 1967 establishing an educational television commission, but legislators that year rejected a funding proposal. The head of the commission gave a 1971 target date for initiating broadcasts, contingent on approval of the governor and the 1969 Wyoming Legislature. However, legislators did not fund the system at that time, partly because the Wyoming portion of federal matching funds under the Public Broadcasting Act of 1967 was too large. Ten years later, in 1979, another gubernatorial commission requested that the Wyoming Legislature appropriate funds to start a public broadcasting station for Wyoming, which would be based in Casper and rebroadcast to the rest of the state. Neither the 1979 nor 1981 Legislatures took steps to establish public television in the state. In the meantime, KRMA and KUED from Salt Lake City were available in different parts of Wyoming.

=== Construction of KCWC-TV ===
Central Wyoming College (CWC) was formed at Riverton in 1968, and its initial curriculum included radio and television instruction, one of two such programs in the state. Students broadcast local community programming seen on cable in Riverton. In November 1980, CWC held a conference on "Telecommunications for Wyoming". Jerry Garber, who headed the college's broadcasting program, convinced the college to apply for television channel 4 in Lander as part of a seven-transmitter system and statewide microwave transmission network. When the 1981 Legislature refused to fund a public TV station, CWC went ahead with its plans. At the same time, KCWY-TV (channel 14), a new commercial station in Casper, applied for channel 4 in Lander as a satellite station. Even when the Federal Communications Commission (FCC) informed the college that channel 5 could be added there, CWC refused the offer because it feared a channel change would affect its planning for federal grant money. Likewise, KCWY feared that switching its application to channel 5 could lead to competition for the newly vacated channel.

The FCC granted the Central Wyoming College application in December 1981, shortly after the college received a federal grant from the National Telecommunications and Information Administration—the largest grant for a new TV station startup—with a planned launch date of January 1983. To secure the grant, CWC president Richard St. Pierre appropriated $325,000 in funds to provide the local match; this decision ultimately caused CWC faculty to vote no confidence in St. Pierre and led to his resignation. In spite of an earlier denial, the college received permission from the United States Forest Service to locate the transmitter on Limestone Mountain. KTWO-TV donated the tower for the Lander transmitter. KCWC-TV aired its first test pattern on May 10, 1983, and began regular broadcasting on May 27. This made Wyoming the 49th state with a public television station (only Montana still lacked one).

College support was abruptly withdrawn for a time after KCWC-TV began broadcasting. Fremont County, which contains Lander and Riverton, lost an iron mine and a uranium mine—keys to its local economy—causing a collapsed housing market and depleting county revenue sources.

=== Statewide expansion ===
Over the 1980s and 1990s, KCWC-TV slowly supplanted other stations that had been imported into the state and expanded its coverage beyond the Lander area. In 1981, Casper College had started a broadcast translator for KRMA-TV from Denver on channel 6, which switched to rebroadcasting KCWC-TV in 1987. Even then, Casper's TCI cable system continued to carry KRMA-TV and did not add KCWC to its offerings until December 1992.

In the late 1980s, CWC received a donated microwave system along with a federal grant for additional microwave links. These resulted in the station's expansion to new areas. In 1990, KCWC, by then branding as Wyoming Public Television, debuted in the Jackson Hole area with three new translators. The network added a translator in Sheridan in 1991 with the assistance of U. S. Senator Malcolm Wallop. After a 1993 effort to fund statewide expansion and build a full-power TV transmitter in southeast Wyoming was scrapped in light of a budget deficit, Wyoming Public Television increased its statewide coverage beginning in 1994 by way of agreements with TCI and KTWO-TV, being added to cable systems in Cheyenne, Laramie, Green River, and Rock Springs.

Wyoming Public Television survived an attempt to cut all state funding in 1999, which would have reduced its budget by a third. Wyoming PBS's endowment was created in 2008 and made permanent by state legislators in 2015, providing annual interest payments to fund local production.

As early as 2003, Wyoming Public Television was broadcasting in digital to the Lander area. In November 2004, it began broadcasting higher-power analog signals over-the-air to Laramie and Cheyenne with the launch of KWYP on channel 8. In March 2007, the Casper translator was replaced with full-power KPTW on channel 6. Wyoming Public Television rebranded as Wyoming PBS on January 1, 2008. It ceased all analog broadcasting by the original digital transition date of February 17, 2009, and flash-cut the Laramie and Casper transmitters to digital.

Though Wyoming PBS is the only public television station in the state, it is not available to all satellite subscribers in Wyoming. Satellite providers are not required to carry low-power stations. Additionally, most of Wyoming's counties are drawn into media markets primarily contained in other states, such as Denver, Salt Lake City, and Rapid City, South Dakota. Satellite providers do not offer Wyoming PBS in the Cheyenne market. Presently, the only satellite subscribers who can receive the station are Dish Network subscribers in the Casper market, which contains 5 of the state's 23 counties. In 2009, the station supported proposed legislation that would have modified rules to allow Wyoming PBS to be made available to in-state viewers in the other designated market areas. The station streams on its website and the PBS app, as well as on YouTube TV.

== Funding ==
For fiscal year 2024, federal appropriations from the Corporation for Public Broadcasting represented $1.32 million or 33 percent of Wyoming PBS's budget, with the state supplying another 48 percent (approximately $1.92 million). In fiscal year 2023, Wyoming PBS received $4.98 million in revenue. This included a state appropriation of $1.81 million and $1.05 million in funding from Central Wyoming College. With the 2025 defunding of the Corporation for Public Broadcasting, Wyoming PBS's remaining revenues come from state and college appropriations as well as donations and leases of tower space. The Hughes Charitable Foundation issued a $500,000 challenge grant to Wyoming PBS in August 2025 with the intent to establish an endowment.

== Local programming ==
In fiscal year 2023, Wyoming PBS produced 27 hours of local programming including the series Wyoming Chronicle, Our Wyoming, Nature WY, and A State of Mind: Confronting Our Mental Health Crisis. It also provided livestreaming of state legislative activities.

== Transmitters ==
Wyoming PBS is broadcast from three full-power transmitters: KCWC-DT in Lander/Riverton, KWYP-DT in Laramie/Cheyenne, and KPTW-DT in Casper. They are augmented by a network of low-power translators that bring the network's signal to the state's other population centers, with a stated combined footprint of 95 percent of the state's population.

Two translators directly repeat KWYP, while the others directly repeat KCWC. Two of KCWC's translators are digital replacement translators serving areas that lost over-the-air coverage after the digital transition.

Wyoming PBS full-power transmitters
Station	City of license	RF and virtual channel	First air date	ERP	HAAT	FID	Transmitter coordinates	Public license information
KCWC-DT	Lander	8 (VHF), virtual 4	May 27, 1983	60 kW	432 m (1,417 ft)	10036	42°34′57.5″N 108°42′35.7″W	Public file; LMS
KWYP-DT	Laramie	8 (VHF), virtual 8	November 2004	13 kW	308 m (1,010 ft)	10032	41°17′16.7″N 105°26′44.5″W	Public file; LMS
KPTW	Casper	8 (VHF), virtual 6	March 2007	2.3 kW	568 m (1,864 ft)	82575	42°44′25.7″N 106°21′36.7″W	Public file; LMS

Translators of Wyoming PBS
City of license	Call sign	Translating	Channel	ERP	HAAT	FID	Transmitter coordinates
Big Piney, etc.	K33JQ-D (Note: Owned by Sublette County.)	KCWC-DT	33	0.02 kW	167 m (548 ft)	167599	42°34′10.7″N 109°54′41.5″W
Buffalo	K19GX-D	KCWC-DT	19	0.2 kW	94 m (308 ft)	167618	44°05′10.9″N 106°40′23.1″W
Cheyenne	K36JO-D	KWYP-DT	36	6 kW	53 m (174 ft)	128524	41°09′34.5″N 104°43′19.8″W
Chugwater	K16IO-D	KCWC-DT	16	0.9 kW	101 m (331 ft)	182338	41°46′8.8″N 104°49′0.8″W
Clareton	K31LF-D	KCWC-DT	31	0.245 kW	101 m (331 ft)	182314	43°44′40.1″N 105°28′03.0″W
Clark	K23IX-D	KCWC-DT	23	0.25 kW	−47 m (−154 ft)	167617	44°56′19.8″N 109°07′2.5″W
Clarks Fork	K02LH-D	KCWC-DT	2	0.04 kW	−332 m (−1,089 ft)	51612	44°53′36.8″N 109°38′24.6″W
Cody, Powell	K19LM-D	KCWC-DT	19	1.0 kW	17.1 m (56 ft)	51616	44°35′13.8″N 108°51′10.5″W
Crowheart	K18JJ-D	KCWC-DT	18	0.335 kW	117 m (384 ft)	181744	43°08′06.2″N 108°55′1.9″W
Douglas	K29JO-D	KCWC-DT	29	1.1 kW	102 m (335 ft)	181738	42°43′25″N 105°18′24″W
Dubois, etc.	K16LT-D	KCWC-DT	16	0.3 kW	381 m (1,250 ft)	167620	43°29′57.8″N 109°41′18.5″W
Evanston	K23DS-D	KCWC-DT	23	0.23 kW	407 m (1,335 ft)	74269	41°21′0.8″N 110°54′18.6″W
Freedom	K31DC-D (Note: Owned by the Lower Star Valley TV Association)	KCWC-DT	31	0.2 kW	684 m (2,244 ft)	38920	43°07′7.7″N 111°7′48.7″W
Gillette	K26NL-D	KCWC-DT	26	5.8 kW	117 m (384 ft)	167621	44°18′17″N 105°33′55″W
Glendo	K21HQ-D	KWYP-DT	21	0.25 kW	161 m (528 ft)	127144	42°20′43.8″N 105°1′55.9″W
Glenrock	K24MK-D	KCWC-DT	24	0.4 kW	64 m (210 ft)	182697	42°53′28.2″N 105°52′5.8″W
Greybull	K19KW-D	KCWC-DT	19	1.15 kW	162 m (531 ft)	167623	44°24′46.8″N 107°59′51.4″W
Jackson	K19FG-D	KCWC-DT	19	0.23 kW	232 m (761 ft)	10033	43°27′44.7″N 110°45′5.7″W
Kemmerer	K24GT-D	KCWC-DT	24	0.37 kW	267 m (876 ft)	128712	41°50′17″N 110°30′14″W
La Barge	K29HV-D	KCWC-DT	29	0.25 kW	571 m (1,873 ft)	167614	42°09′26.7″N 110°19′41.5″W
Lander	KCWC-DT (DRT)	KCWC-DT	16	0.12 kW	7 m (23 ft)	10036	42°54′20.8″N 108°42′21.4″W
Lovell	K27OU-D	KCWC-DT	27	1.2 kW	82 m (269 ft)	167622	44°51′36.1″N 108°29′47.1″W
Lucerne	K22NJ-D	KCWC-DT	22	0.35 kW	41 m (135 ft)	167591	43°42′45.9″N 107°53′1.3″W
Meeteetse, etc.	K29IH-D	KCWC-DT	29	1.25 kW	72 m (236 ft)	167615	44°12′44.2″N 108°51′30″W
Mountain View	K36OU-D	KCWC-DT	36	0.3 kW	310 m (1,017 ft)	27129	41°06′19.2″N 110°12′38.5″W
Mountain View, etc.	K16NU-D	KCWC-DT	16	0.3 kW	14 m (46 ft)	27130	41°06′19.2″N 110°12′38.5″W
Newcastle	K15II-D	KCWC-DT	15	0.23 kW	−27 m (−89 ft)	181516	43°50′23.9″N 104°12′4.7″W
North Fork, etc.	K32IF-D	KCWC-DT	32	0.2 kW	599 m (1,965 ft)	167626	44°29′36.8″N 109°10′9.5″W
Pinedale	K19HJ-D	KCWC-DT	19	0.1 kW	185 m (607 ft)	167598	42°55′8.7″N 110°00′54.5″W
Rawlins	K15MP-D	KCWC-DT	15	2.75 kW	292 m (958 ft)	56610	41°40′52.6″N 107°14′13.2″W
Rawlins	K19MG-D	KCWC-DT	19	0.32 kW	67 m (220 ft)	167613	41°46′15.7″N 107°14′16.9″W
Rock Springs	K28JU-D	KCWC-DT	28	0.5 kW	372 m (1,220 ft)	167610	41°34′43″N 109°19′14″W
Sage Junction	K17NG-D	KCWC-DT	17	2 kW	93 m (305 ft)	182684	41°49′8.3″N 110°58′26.8″W
Sheridan	K15HK-D	KCWC-DT	15	4 kW	368 m (1,207 ft)	167612	44°37′25.7″N 107°07′5.1″W
Sundance	K15KM-D	KCWC-DT	15	0.92 kW	270 m (886 ft)	181532	44°23′16.9″N 104°22′36.8″W
Sunlight Basin	K29IG-D	KCWC-DT	29	0.22 kW	482 m (1,581 ft)	167609	44°45′14.2″N 109°22′30″W
Teton Village	K16LM-D	KCWC-DT	16	0.5 kW	741 m (2,431 ft)	167611	43°35′47.4″N 110°52′10.4″W
Thermopolis	KCWC-DT (DRT)	KCWC-DT	16	0.09 kW	71.8 m (236 ft)	10036	43°39′7.8″N 108°15′7.3″W
Torrington	K18JD-D	KCWC-DT	18	0.23 kW	−12 m (−39 ft)	181528	42°04′34.8″N 104°11′29.8″W
Wood River	K31JO-D	KCWC-DT	31	0.25 kW	218 m (715 ft)	167608	44°04′29.8″N 108°56′12.4″W
Wright	K25LI-D	KCWC-DT	25	0.9 kW	223 m (732 ft)	181734	43°43′25.9″N 105°53′6″W

== Subchannels ==
Subchannels of KCWC-DT, KWYP-DT, and KPTW
Subchannel			Res.	Short name			Programming
KCWC-DT	KWYP-DT	KPTW	Res.	KCWC-DT	KWYP-DT	KPTW	Programming
4.1	8.1	6.1	1080i	KCWC-HD	KWYP-HD	KPTW-HD	PBS
4.2	8.2	6.2	480i	KCWC-SD	KWYP-SD	KPTW-SD	Create
4.3	8.3	6.3	480i	KIDS-SD			PBS Kids
4.4	8.4	6.4	480i	FNX-SD			First Nations Experience
