= KPIF =

Television station in Pocatello, Idaho

- Pocatello–Idaho Falls, Idaho; United States
- City: Pocatello, Idaho
- Channels: Digital: 15 (UHF); Virtual: 15

Programming
- Affiliations: 15.1: Grit; for others, see § Subchannels

Ownership
- Owner: Ventura Broadcasting; (Ventura Media Communications, LLC)
- Sister stations: KVUI

History
- First air date: March 1, 2004
- Former channel numbers: Analog: 15 (UHF, 2004–2009)
- Former affiliations: America One (2004); The WB (2004–2006); The CW (2006–2009); Retro TV (2009–2011, 2014–2017); Dark (2011–2014); MeTV (2017–2021)
- Call sign meaning: Pocatello–Idaho Falls

Technical information
- Licensing authority: FCC
- Facility ID: 86205
- ERP: 288 kW
- HAAT: 331.1 m (1,086 ft)
- Transmitter coordinates: 42°51′50.1″N 112°31′13.3″W

Links
- Public license information: Public file; LMS
- Website: Official website

KPIF (channel 15) is a television station licensed to Pocatello, Idaho, United States, serving the Idaho Falls–Pocatello media market as an affiliate of the digital multicast network Grit. It is owned by Ventura Broadcasting alongside Ion Television affiliate KVUI (channel 31, also licensed to Pocatello). The two stations share studios on West Alameda Road in Pocatello; KPIF's transmitter is located on Howard Mountain.

== History ==
The original construction permit for KPIF was granted on March 2, 2001, to Pocatello Channel 15, L.L.C., a partnership between KM Communications, Inc. of Skokie, Illinois, Kaleidoscope Foundation, Inc. of Little Rock, Arkansas (a subsidiary of Equity Broadcasting Corporation), and Potelco Broadcasting of Greensboro, North Carolina. The three companies had been competing applicants for a channel 15 television station in Pocatello, and agreed in 2000 to form a partnership in order to expedite construction of the station. In 2003, due to irreconcilable differences that caused delays in development of the permit, Myoung Hwa Bae of KM Communications extended an offer to buy out the other two members. KM Communications completed construction of the station and signed on in March 2004 under Program Test Authority from the Federal Communications Commission (FCC). The station applied for a license to cover the construction permit on March 1, 2004, and was granted the license on October 11, 2006.

Initially, KPIF was affiliated with America One, but the station picked up a WB affiliation in July 2004. It became an affiliate of The CW on September 18, 2006. At one point, KBEO (channel 11) from Jackson, Wyoming (which was the first to sign on, on March 30, 2001) became a satellite of KPIF (KBEO has since gone dark).

After The CW moved to a digital subchannel of ABC affiliate KIFI-TV (channel 8) on September 7, 2009, the station switched to RTV (now Retro TV).

== Technical information ==
=== Subchannels ===
The station's signal is multiplexed:

Subchannels of KPIF
Channel	Res.	Short name	Programming
15.1	720p	Grit	Grit
15.2	480i	IONPlus	Ion Plus
15.3	480i	Laff	Laff
15.4	480i	West	WEST
15.5	480i	MeTOONS	MeTV Toons (4:3)
15.6	480i	CourtTV	Court TV
15.7	480i	Story	Story Television
15.8	480i	QVC	QVC
15.9	480i	JTV	Jewelry Television (4:3)
15.10	480i	Daystar	Daystar
15.11	480i	DSTRESP	Daystar Español
15.12	480i	Ace	Ace TV
15.13	480i	NewsMx2	Newsmax2

As of November 2021, Grit moved from 15.2 to the main subchannel. A few other subchannels changed their affiliations too, including 15.2 (Heroes & Icons to Defy TV), 15.3 (Grit to TrueReal), 15.4 (Stadium to Bounce TV; the latter network previously aired on 15.4 from 2020 to June 2021), and 15.7 (Pursuit Channel to Newsy).

=== Analog-to-digital conversion ===
KPIF shut down its analog signal, over UHF channel 15, on June 12, 2009, and "flash-cut" its digital signal into operation on UHF channel 15, as they were granted original construction permits after the FCC finalized the DTV allotment plan on April 21, 1997.

While KPIF did broadcast a digital signal after the analog shutdown, it did not apply for a license to cover or an extension of the digital construction permit (which expired on June 12, 2009) until 2014. KPIF was granted a broadcast license for its digital signal on February 6, 2016.
