= KGWN-TV =

Television station in Cheyenne, Wyoming

KGWN-TV and KSTF

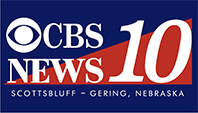

KGWN-TV: Cheyenne, Wyoming; KSTF: Scottsbluff–Gering, Nebraska; United States
- Channels for KGWN-TV: Digital: 30 (UHF); Virtual: 5
- Channels for KSTF: Digital: 29 (UHF); Virtual: 10
- Branding: 5.1: KGWN Cheyenne; Wyoming News Now; Cheyenne News Now; 10.1: CBS 10 News, Your Station; 5.2/10.2: KGWN Scottsbluff; 5.3/10.3: Cheyenne CW 2/18

Programming
- Affiliations: 5.1/10.1: CBS; 5.2/10.2: NBC; 5.3/10.3: The CW Plus

Ownership
- Owner: Marquee Broadcasting; (Marquee Broadcasting West, Inc.)
- Sister stations: KCWY-DT, KNEP

History
- First air date: KGWN-TV: March 22, 1954; KSTF: August 21, 1955
- Former call signs: KGWN-TV: KFBC-TV (1954–1972); KYCU-TV (1972–1986)
- Former channel number: KGWN-TV: Analog: 5 (VHF, 1954–2009); KSTF: Analog: 10 (VHF, 1955–2009)
- Former affiliations: KGWN-TV: ABC (primary 1954–1965 and 1976–1984, joint primary 1965–1972, secondary 1972–1976 and 1984–1988); DuMont (secondary, 1954–1955); NBC (secondary, 1954–1976 and 1984–1987); CBS (joint primary 1965–1972, primary 1972–1976); The CW (5.2, 2006–2008); KSTF: ABC (primary 1955–1965 and 1976–1981, joint primary 1965–1969 and 1981–1984, secondary 1969–1976); CBS (joint primary, 1965–1969 and 1981–1984, primary 1969–1976); NBC (secondary, 1955–1976 and 1984–1987)
- Call sign meaning: KGWN-TV: "Great Western Network"; KSTF: Scottsbluff

Technical information
- Licensing authority: FCC
- Facility ID: KGWN-TV: 63166; KSTF: 63182
- ERP: KGWN-TV: 459 kW; KSTF: 3.5 kW
- HAAT: KGWN-TV: 162 m (531 ft); KSTF: 187 m (614 ft)
- Transmitter coordinates: KGWN-TV: 41°6′0.4″N 105°0′25.2″W; KSTF: 41°59′58.4″N 103°40′32.2″W
- Translator: K19FX-D (19) Laramie

Links
- Public license information: KGWN-TV: Public file; LMS; KSTF: Public file; LMS
- Website: www.wyomingnewsnow.tv

KGWN-TV (channel 5) is a television station in Cheyenne, Wyoming, United States, affiliated with CBS and The CW Plus. The station is owned by Marquee Broadcasting, and maintains studios on East Lincolnway/East 14th Street/I-80 BUS/US 30 in Cheyenne; its transmitter is located in unincorporated Laramie County (west of Cheyenne) between I-80/US 30 and WYO 225.

KGWN provides NBC programming on its second digital subchannel through a simulcast of sister station KNEP in Scottsbluff, Nebraska, while its third subchannel is the market's CW affiliate.

KSTF (channel 10) in Scottsbluff operates as a semi-satellite of KGWN; this station maintains studios on 10th Street in Gering, while its transmitter is located along N-71 at the Scotts Bluff–Sioux county line.

K19FX-D (channel 19) in Laramie is a low-power translator of KGWN-TV. This translator extends coverage to the few areas of Laramie who are unable to receive KGWN over the air; most Cheyenne television signals are unable to reach Laramie due to the Laramie Mountains. The translator is located on Forest Road southeast of Laramie.

== History ==
The station signed on the air on March 22, 1954, as KFBC-TV airing an analog signal on VHF channel 5. It was owned by the McCraken family along with the Wyoming State Leader-Tribune and Wyoming Eagle (later merged as Wyoming Tribune Eagle) and KFBC radio (1240 AM). It is Wyoming's oldest television station. For over 30 years, it was the only commercial station in eastern Wyoming. As such, it carried programming from all four major networks of the time—CBS, NBC, ABC, and DuMont—but was initially a primary ABC affiliate. That may have seemed unusual as Cheyenne has always been a rather small market. In most markets as small as Cheyenne, ABC was usually relegated to secondary status due to being the smallest and weakest network. However, KFBC radio had been an ABC Radio affiliate for many years. Additionally, there had been some speculation Cheyenne would eventually be collapsed into the Denver market since the area is only a few miles from the Colorado border. However, Cheyenne viewers were still able to view the full schedules of all the three major networks via cable—then as now, all but essential for acceptable television in much of this market. The Denver stations have been available on cable since cable arrived in the area in the mid-1950s.

In 1965, channel 5 took on an unusual "joint primary" affiliation with CBS and ABC, while continuing to slightly favor ABC.

In 1972, the McCrackens were forced to break up their media empire due to a Federal Communications Commission (FCC) rule that barred one person from owning the sole newspaper, radio station and television station in a city. They sold their television stations to Wyneco Communications, owned by Toledo-based attorney Edward Lamb, which changed the call letters of the flagship station to KYCU-TV. The new owners took on a primary affiliation with CBS, relegating ABC to secondary status.

However, on July 11, 1976, it switched its primary affiliation to ABC and dropped all NBC programming. KEVN-TV signed on in Rapid City, South Dakota, that day as a full-time ABC affiliate, and KYCU/KSTF felt obliged to fill the ABC void in Scottsbluff, as KOTA-TV in Rapid City and its Scottsbluff satellite, KDUH-TV (now KNEP), were primary NBC affiliates with a secondary CBS affiliation. Wyneco sold the station to Burke Broadcasting in 1983. When KOTA/KDUH switched to ABC in June 1984, KYCU/KSTF switched its primary affiliation to CBS, with ABC and NBC as secondary affiliations. However, as the 1980s wore on, the station began gradually phasing out NBC programming.

=== KGWN ===
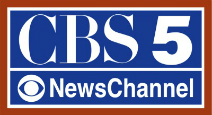
Former KGWN logo

Burke Broadcasting sold KYCU to Stauffer Communications in 1986, who changed its call sign to the current KGWN-TV on New Year's Day 1987. Later in 1987, channel 5 dropped NBC altogether when KKTU (now KQCK) signed on as a satellite of KTWO-TV in Casper. The station had been one of the few in the country that still "cherry-picked" programming from all three networks. ABC programming disappeared from the schedule by 1988. When Stauffer merged with Morris Communications in 1996, KGWN and most of the rest of Stauffer's television holdings went to Benedek Broadcasting. That company went bankrupt in 2001 (it merged with Gray Television a year later) and KGWN was sold to Chelsey Broadcasting. In 2003, the station was acquired by SagamoreHill Broadcasting.

In 2000, Benedek ended most local operations at KGWC-TV in Casper and its two satellites: KGWR-TV (in Rock Springs) and KGWL-TV (in Lander). The three stations became semi-satellites of KGWN. In 2003, Chelsey Broadcasting agreed to sell all three to Mark III Media (a group that included former KTWO-TV General Manager Mark Nalbone). After the FCC dismissed several objections to the sale, Mark III consummated the agreement to buy the stations on May 31, 2006.

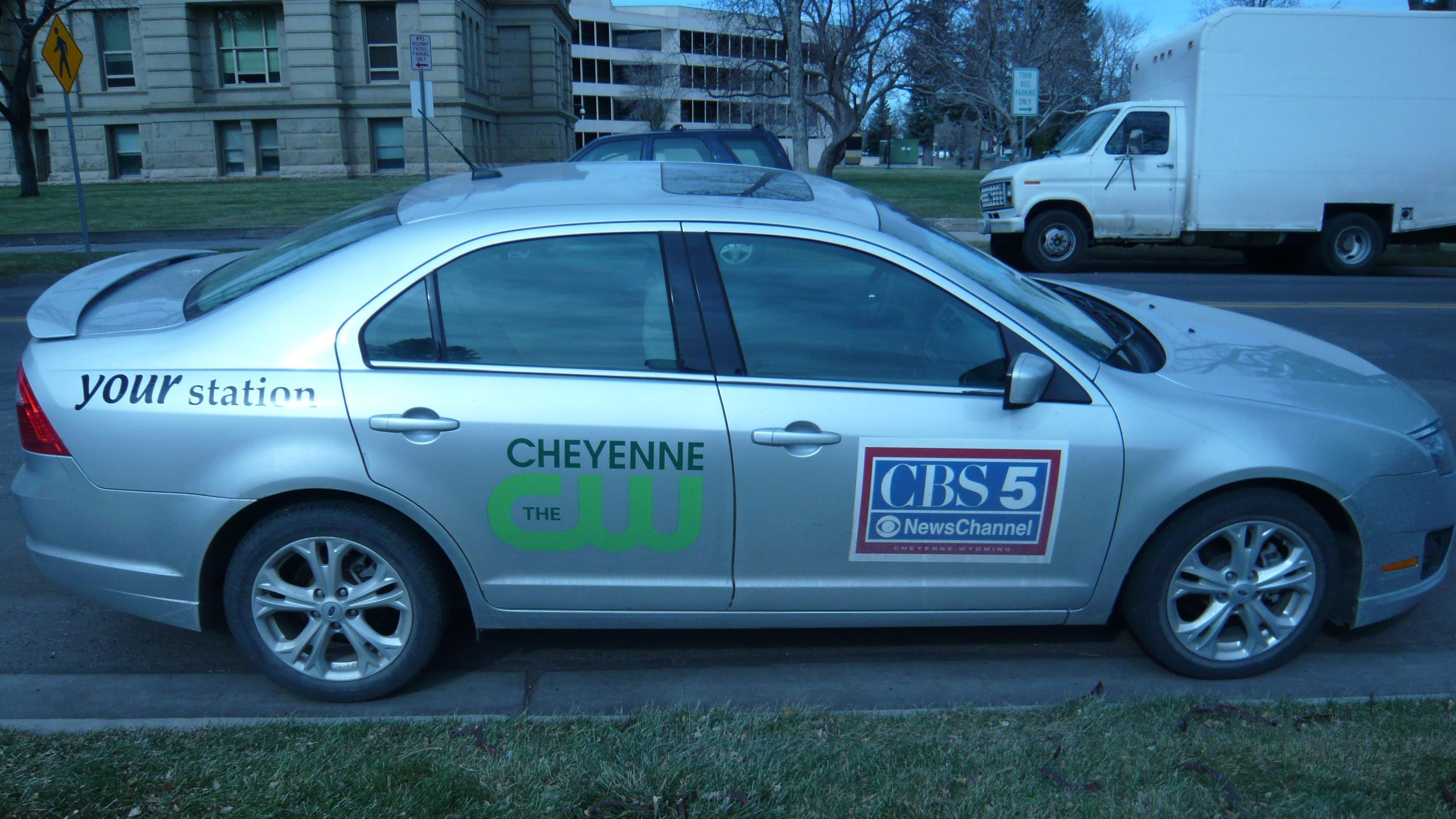
Vehicle sporting the logos of Cheyenne CW and CBS 5 NewsChannel in 2013.

On September 18, 2006, KGWN began carrying programming from The CW on a new second digital subchannel. This was dropped in September 2008 in favor of a standard definition simulcast of the main signal targeted towards Northern Colorado. The CW programming continued to be seen on area cable systems. On April 29, 2009, the carriage contract of KGWN and "Cheyenne CW" expired. This led to SagamoreHill Broadcasting demanding that Bresnan Cable remove the two channels, resulting in approximately 30,000 customers (reported as 80% of their viewership) losing access to local CBS and CW programming. The dispute hinged on the amount SagamoreHill wanted to charge Bresnan for the rights to carry the stations.

KGWN waged a propaganda campaign in the days leading up to the end of the contract attempting to change Bresnan Cable customers to Dish Network. KGWN refused to post any comments on its site regarding customers who did not wish to see the contract renewed despite news coverage of the dispute having elicited numerous such comments. On May 8, 2009, the stations were restored to the Bresnan system. In December 2011, CW programming was added to subchannel 5.3 and NOCO 5 programming on subchannel 5.2 was improved to 720p.

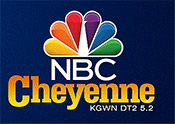
Former DT2 logo, to October 2017.

In May 2013, SagamoreHill Broadcasting reached a deal to sell KGWN and KSTF, along with KGNS-TV in Laredo, Texas, to Yellowstone Holdings, a subsidiary of Frontier Radio Management. On November 4, 2013, Gray Television announced a deal to acquire Yellowstone Holdings for $23 million. KGWN-TV was operated under a local marketing agreement by Gray until the closure of the deal, on December 31.

Logo for Cheyenne News Now

Logo for Wyoming News Now

On January 24, 2019, Gray announced that the news operations of KGWN-TV and KCWY-DT would be merged under the Wyoming News Now banner by April 9. Under this arrangement, KGWN's 5:30 p.m. newscast became the only Cheyenne-specific newscast (with KCWY airing a Casper-only newscast at 5 p.m.); all other newscasts, while being produced at KGWN, are simulcast on KCWY in Casper and cover both markets. The consolidation came after the Department of Justice (DOJ) blocked Gray's acquisition of the CBS affiliation of Casper's KGWC-TV, which would have given Gray a second revenue stream in that market to cover KCWY's financial losses.

On February 1, 2024, Gray Television announced it would swap KGWN-TV and KCWY-DT to Marquee Broadcasting in exchange for Marquee's construction permit for KCBU in Salt Lake City, Utah. The transaction was completed on July 1, 2024.

=== Northern Colorado 5 (2005–2013) ===
After having been dropped from the cable system in Northern Colorado by the time KCNC-TV became a CBS owned-and-operated station in 1995, KGWN took action to entice cable systems to carry the station in 2005. Although Northern Colorado is part of the Denver market, KGWN has long claimed Northern Colorado as part of its primary coverage area. Due to its transmitter's location close to the Colorado border, it provides city-grade coverage of Fort Collins, Loveland, and Greeley, as well as grade B coverage as far south as Longmont and Boulder. It had long been carried on cable systems in Fort Collins, Loveland, and Greeley alongside Denver's CBS affiliate (originally KMGH-TV and now KCNC). Additionally, many cable systems on the Wyoming side of the Denver market long carried both KGWN and KMGH, and continue to carry both KGWN and KCNC.

The station tried to lobby Comcast for carriage on its Northern Colorado systems in early 2005, to no avail. KGWN was talking in August to the owner of the Colorado Eagles hockey team owner about broadcasting their games. By October, the station had opened a bureau in Fort Collins with two sale representatives and a reporter. US Cable agreed to carry the station beginning on November 1. The Eagles team and the station agreed to its first carriage deal for a single playoff game with the Oklahoma City Blazers on April 2, 2006, which was broadcast via Channel 5's Cheyenne transmitter. In 2005, KGWN established a Northern Colorado Bureau in Fort Collins, which produced its first newscast in June 2006. This provided another source of local news coverage in the area besides stations based in Denver. In early March 2007, the station filed a case with the FCC to have the local market changed to included Larimer and Weld counties, as prior to cable's dominance in the mid-1990s, the station served the two counties and has made other current moves to serve the area. Comcast finally caved and added KGWN on three systems. In June 2008, the station suspended its Northern Colorado operations only to restart them on September 15, 2008.

On September 15, 2008, this operation was expanded after KGWN-DT2 launched a weeknight 35 minute newscast in partnership with the Independent News Network (INN). Known as Northern Colorado 5 News at 10, the broadcast was recorded in advance from INN's production facility on Tremont Avenue in Davenport, Iowa. The news anchor, meteorologist, and sports anchor were provided by the centralized news operation and other personnel from INN filled-in as necessary. By September 2008, KGWN began broadcasting a separate CBS feed, identified as Northern Colorado 5 or NoCo 5 in short, on its second digital subchannel that specifically focused on Northern Colorado.

At some point in time, production of Northern Colorado 5 News at 10 moved to a secondary set at KGWN's studios in Cheyenne and was no longer outsourced to the Independent News Network. Although the program was still taped in advance, it now featured anchor personnel from KGWN while three reporters based locally in Fort Collins contributed Northern Colorado–specific content to the broadcast. In addition, there were weekday morning local weather cut-ins during CBS This Morning that were taped at KGWN's facility but with a focus on Northern Colorado. Weekday mornings from 6 to 6:30, KGWN-DT2 simulcast local radio station KXBG (97.9 FM). Following at 6:30, there was a local weather forecast segment which repeats several times during the half-hour. The Colorado-focused station did not simulcast any newscasts from its parent station.

"Northern Colorado 5" was discontinued on December 19, 2013. In announcing the closure, KGWN cited the inability to make the service "a viable long-term operation."

=== KSTF ===
KSTF signed on August 21, 1955, as a semi-satellite of KFBC-TV. In 1958, KOTA-TV in Rapid City, South Dakota, put its own satellite station on-the-air in Scottsbluff, KDUH-TV (now KNEP). During the next twelve years, there was a great amount of confusion among Scottsbluff viewers especially when the two stations aired the same program simultaneously. Both had unusual "joint primary" affiliations with ABC and CBS from 1965 onwards. Although KFBC/KSTF slightly favored ABC and KOTA/KDUH slightly favored CBS, it did not help the duplication problem. However, in 1970, KDUH, along with KOTA, dropped CBS for NBC.

=== KTVS ===
On December 28, 1963, KTVS (channel 3) in Sterling, Colorado, signed on as another semi-satellite serving Northeastern Colorado. In September 1999, Benedek sold that station to the Newsweb Corporation which made it a satellite of Denver's KTVD. Channel 3 now operates as KCDO-TV, an independent station targeting Denver.

== Technical information ==
The stations' signals are multiplexed:

=== Subchannels ===
Logo for DT2 subchannel.

Logo for DT3 subchannel.

Subchannels of KGWN-TV and KSTF
Subchannel		Res.	Short name		Programming
KGWN-TV	KSTF	Res.	KGWN-TV	KSTF	Programming
5.1	10.1	1080i	KGWN-HD	KSTF-HD	CBS
5.2	10.2	720p	KGWN-NC	KSTF-NC	NBC (KNEP)
5.3	10.3	720p	KGWN-CW	KSTF-CW	The CW Plus

Simulcast of subchannel of another station

KGWN turned off its analog signal on channel 5 (VHF), and transitioned to digital on UHF 30 on the mandatory June 12, 2009, conversion date at 3 p.m. local time.

KGWN's semi-satellite KSTF did not offer any subchannels until upgrades to the microwave link connecting the stations were made in the mid-2010s; additionally, as the link used analog equipment, KSTF could only broadcast in standard definition. However, KGWN's high definition feed was carried in Scottsbluff on Charter digital channel 785. As of 2015, KSTF broadcasts in high definition and carries the KGWN subchannels.

By March 2020, the KGWN-DT3 feed of Cheyenne CW had been upgraded into 720p HD over-the-air; it had been airing in the 4:3 standard definition picture format, before then; the KSTF-DT3 feed of Cheyenne CW was upgraded to 720p HD sometime in the early 2020s. Meanwhile, the KGWN feed of CBS had been upgraded into 1080i full HD over-the-air; before then, it had been airing in the 720p HD picture format.

=== Translator ===
- K19FX-D Laramie (translates KGWN-TV)

== See also ==
- Hawaii News Now (a similar joint news operation based in Honolulu, Hawaii)
