= KBEO =

- Jackson, Wyoming; United States
- Channels: Digital: 11 (VHF); Virtual: 11

Programming
- Affiliations: America One (2001–2004); The WB (2004–2006); The CW (2006–2009); RTV (2009–2010)

Ownership
- Owner: KM Communications; (Pocatello Channel 15, LLC)

History
- First air date: March 30, 2001
- Last air date: July 16, 2010
- Former channel numbers: Analog: 11 (VHF, 2001–2009)

Technical information
- Facility ID: 35103
- ERP: 30 kW
- HAAT: 603 m (1,978 ft)
- Transmitter coordinates: 43°38′14″N 110°38′3″W

KBEO (channel 11) was a television station in Jackson, Wyoming, United States. Owned by KM Communications, it was last affiliated with Retro TV.

== History ==
KBEO signed on March 30, 2001. The station originally operated separately as an America One affiliate, but became a satellite of KPIF in Pocatello, Idaho, after that station opened in March 2004.

Because it was granted an original construction permit after the Federal Communications Commission (FCC) finalized the DTV allotment plan on April 21, 1997, KBEO did not receive a companion channel for digital television stations. Instead, on June 12, 2009, which was the end of the digital TV conversion period for full-service stations, KBEO was to have turned off its analog signal and turned on its digital signal (called a "flash-cut").

On July 16, 2010, KBEO ceased broadcasting due to financial problems. However, it had failed to apply for a digital license to cover or extension of the construction permit; furthermore, the analog signal had left the air for good, also for financial reasons, on September 24, 2008. As a result, on July 26, 2010, the FCC canceled KBEO's license.
