= US Cable =

American cable company

US Cable Group
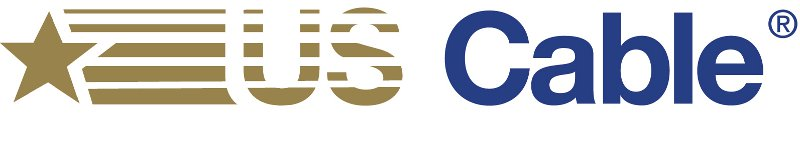
- Industry: Cable television
- Founded: 1976; 50 years ago
- Founder: Stephen E. Myers, Chairman; Michael C. Anderson, Executive Vice President
- Defunct: August 21, 2011
- Successor: Baja Broadband
- Headquarters: Montvale, New Jersey, United States

The US Cable Group was a cable television provider that at its peak served over 240,000 subscribers in twelve states. It was among the top 35 cable providers in the nation and had cable systems in Colorado, Florida, Georgia, Illinois, Indiana, Minnesota, Missouri, New Jersey, New Mexico, South Carolina, Texas and Wisconsin.

== History ==
US Cable was founded as M.A.I. Cablevision in 1976 in Watson, New York by stockbrokers Stephen E. Myers and Michael Anderson. Through the 1970s and 1980s, US Cable acquired and built many cable systems. US Cable had a couple joint ventures with Tele-Communications Inc. (TCI) during the 1980s. In 1992, Liberty Media (owned by TCI) acquired 50% of all of US Cable's cable properties. In 1997, TCI purchased all of the systems in Illinois, Indiana, and New Jersey.

While most of US Cable Group's systems were operated under US Cable of Coastal-Texas, L.P., one cable system in Northern New Jersey was operated under US Cable of Paramus-Hillsdale, LLC. This system was acquired by Cablevision from TCI along with several other systems in New York and New Jersey in 1998. In early 1999, US Cable bought the system from Cablevision because of a Federal Trade Commission order that required them to divest their assets in those towns to preserve competition. However, with increased competition from Verizon FiOS US Cable sold the system back to Cablevision in 2009.

In June 2011, US Cable sold off its systems in Minnesota and Wisconsin with 33,000 subscribers to Midcontinent Communications and its systems in Missouri with 16,000 subscribers to Charter Communications. On August 21, 2011, Baja Broadband acquired US Cable and its remaining 60,000 subscribers in Colorado, New Mexico, and Texas.
