= KQCK =

Television station in Cheyenne, Wyoming

KQCK and KQDK-CD
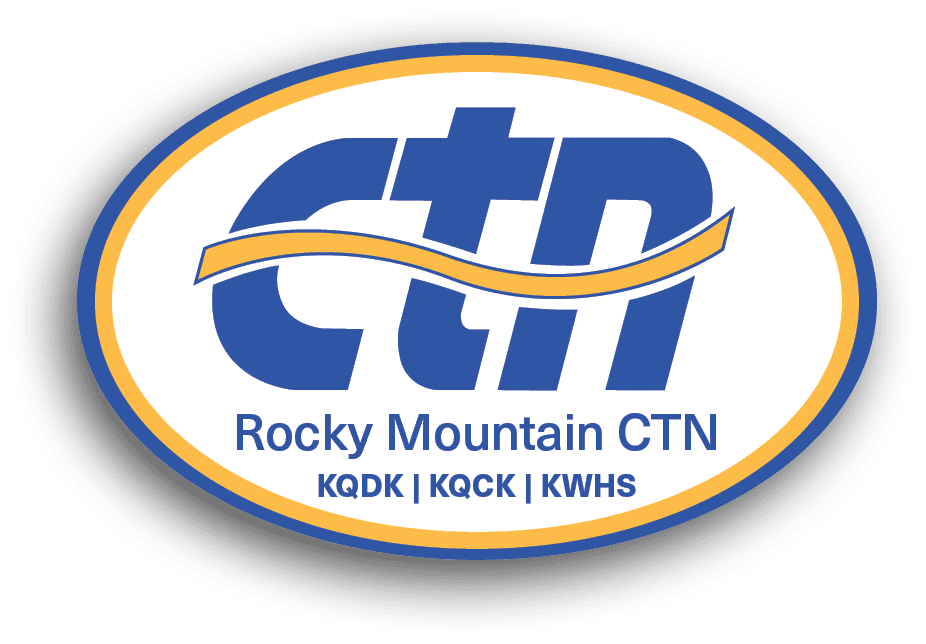

KQCK: Cheyenne, Wyoming; KQDK-CD: Denver, Colorado (Note: Originally licensed to Aurora, Colorado; moved to Denver in 2019.); United States
- Channels for KQCK: Digital: 11 (VHF); Virtual: 33
- Channels for KQDK-CD: Digital: 16 (UHF); Virtual: 33
- Branding: Rocky Mountain CTN

Programming
- Affiliations: 33.1: CTN; for others, see § Subchannels

Ownership
- Owner: Christian Television Network; (Christian Television Corporation, Inc.)
- Sister stations: KWHS-LD

History
- Founded: KQDK-CD: October 30, 1990
- First air date: KQCK: August 28, 1987; KQDK-CD: November 15, 1999
- Former call signs: KQCK: KKTU (1987–2005); KDEV (2005–2008); KQDK-CD: K16CM (?–1999); K62FW (1999–2000); KDEV-LP (2000–2008); KQDK-CA (2008–2013)
- Former channel number: KQCK: Analog: 33 (UHF, 1987–2008); KQDK-CD: Analog: 39 (UHF, until 2013); Digital: 39 (UHF, 2013–2019)
- Former affiliations: KQCK: NBC (1987–2003); The WB (secondary, 1995–1998); ABC (2003–2006, 33.2 2008–2009); RTN (2006–2009); Silent (January–March 2009); AMGTV (March–October 2009); @SportsTV (October 2009–2010); VasalloVision (2010–2012); MundoFox (2012–2014)
- Call sign meaning: KQCK: Equity Cheyenne (referring to former owner)

Technical information
- Licensing authority: FCC
- Facility ID: KQCK: 18287; KQDK-CD: 29455
- Class: KQDK-CD: CD
- ERP: KQCK: 16 kW; KQDK-CD: 2 kW
- HAAT: KQCK: 650 m (2,133 ft); KQDK-CD: 85.5 m (281 ft)
- Transmitter coordinates: KQCK: 40°32′46.5″N 105°11′51.9″W; KQDK-CD: 39°40′31.2″N 104°52′24.1″W

Links
- Public license information: KQCK: Public file; LMS; KQDK-CD: Public file; LMS
- Website: www.ctnonline.com/affiliate-stations/ctn-rocky-mountain/

KQCK (channel 33) is a religious television station licensed to Cheyenne, Wyoming, United States, serving the markets of Cheyenne and Denver, Colorado. The station is owned by the Christian Television Network (CTN). KQCK's studios are located on Yates Street in the Denver suburb of Westminster, and its transmitter is located on Horsetooth Mountain, just outside Fort Collins, Colorado.

KQDK-CD (channel 16) in Denver operates as a low-power, Class A digital translator of KQCK; this station's transmitter is located near East Iliff Avenue and South Emporia Avenue (near SH 83) in southeastern Denver.

== History ==
KQCK was originally assigned the call letters KDBJ when the station was first licensed by the Federal Communications Commission on August 14, 1985. The station first signed on the air on August 28, 1987, as KKTU. It originally operated as a satellite station of NBC affiliate KTWO-TV (channel 2) in Casper. As a result of KKTU's sign-on, Cheyenne became one of the last markets in the United States to receive full-time affiliations from the three major broadcast networks. Prior to 1987, NBC programming had been relegated to off-hours clearances on KGWN-TV (channel 5), although the network's Denver affiliate KCNC-TV (channel 4, now a CBS owned-and-operated station) had been available in the area on cable television for decades. For a time starting in 1995, KKTU (along with KTWO) had a secondary affiliation with The WB.

KQDK-CD was founded on October 30, 1990, as K16CM.

On September 1, 2003, the NBC affiliation in Casper moved from KTWO-TV to KCWY (channel 13). Although KTWO temporarily became an independent station at that time until it could acquire the ABC affiliation from KFNB (channel 20), KKTU was able to immediately switch to ABC; it began branding itself as "ABC 8", in reference to its channel placement on Cheyenne area cable systems. This made Cheyenne one of the last markets in the country to have an ABC affiliate. Before the switch, cable systems piped in Denver's ABC affiliate—first via KUSA-TV (channel 9), then from KMGH-TV (channel 7) following a three-way network affiliation switch that occurred on September 10, 1995. KMGH had actually operated a translator in Cheyenne since the late 1990s. On May 31, 2005, the station changed its call letters to KDEV, with plans on expanding its signal into the nearby Denver market. Indeed, it built its digital transmitter near Fort Collins, in the Denver market.

On May 31, 2006, the Equity Broadcasting Corporation sold KTWO-TV to Silverton Media. Equity retained ownership of KDEV, but entered into a local marketing agreement with Silverton to operate it as a satellite of KTWO. Equity later moved the ABC affiliation in Cheyenne to a low-powered repeater, KKTU-LP (channel 40), and switched KDEV's affiliation to its in-house classic television network, the Retro Television Network. On June 8, 2008, KDEV began simulcasting KKTU-LP's ABC programming over its analog signal (restoring the "ABC 8" branding), and on its second digital subchannel. Nine days later on June 17, 2008, the station changed its call sign to KQCK.

On January 4, 2009, a contract conflict between Equity and Luken Communications (which had acquired RTN in June 2008) resulted in many RTN affiliates losing the network's programming. As a result, Luken moved RTN's operations to its headquarters in Chattanooga, Tennessee, and dropped its programming from all Equity-owned affiliates, including KQCK and KQDK, effective immediately. RTN would eventually sign a deal to affiliate with Sterling-based KCDO-TV (channel 3) that May. KQCK subsequently switched to AMGTV in March 2009, and then to @SportsTV in October.

On April 16, 2009, KQCK and KQDK, along with two other television stations, were purchased at auction by Valley Bank for $7 million. Valley Bank, in turn, filed to sell the stations to an ownership group connected to Fusion Communications on September 9. ABC programming remained on KQCK-DT2 and channel 40, by then renamed KDEV-LP, until 2009, when KTWO-TV began simulcasting its programming over the second digital subchannel of KLWY (channel 27). KQCK and KDEV-LP eventually parted ways; the latter station eventually switched to MyNetworkTV and then MeTV before shutting down in 2012.

In January 2010, KQCK and KQDK joined the Spanish language network VasalloVision. KQCK was acquired by Casa Media Partners in April 2012. The station subsequently switched its affiliation to MundoFox on August 13, 2012. Concurrent with the launch of KQDK's digital signal, on February 12, 2013, the station modified its call sign to KQDK-CD. In late 2014, KQCK and KQDK dropped MundoFox for the Christian Television Network. Casa Media Partners filed for Chapter 11 bankruptcy on April 14, 2015. On January 9, 2017, CTN's parent company, the Christian Television Corporation, agreed to purchase KQCK outright; on April 12 of that year, it agreed to also acquire KQDK-CD. The sale was completed on June 30, 2017.

Sometime in 2019, KQDK-CD's city of license was moved from Aurora, Colorado, to Denver.

== Technical information ==
=== Subchannels ===
The stations' signals are multiplexed:

Subchannels of KQCK and KQDK-CD
Channel	Res.	Short name	Programming
33.1	1080i	CTN	CTN
33.2	480i	LFST	CTN Lifestyle (4:3)
33.3	480i	CTNi	CTN International (4:3)
33.4	480i	BIZ-TV	Biz TV (4:3)

=== Analog-to-digital conversion ===
KQCK shut down its analog signal, over UHF channel 33, on June 27, 2008, as a result of an equipment failure that forced the station to shut down the analog signal; however, it continued to transmit its programming over its digital signal and on cable via a direct-to-studio transmission link. Due to the cost of repairing the analog facilities, and the proximity of the end of the digital television transition, KQCK requested to permanently shut down its analog transmissions. The station's digital signal remained on its pre-transition VHF channel 11, using virtual channel 33.

KQDK-CD shut down its analog signal, over UHF channel 39, on February 12, 2013. The station flash-cut its digital signal into operation on its pre-transition UHF channel 39.
