= K27PT-D =

Television station in Casper, Wyoming

Translator of KFNB, Casper, Wyoming

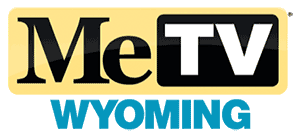
- Casper, Wyoming; United States
- Channels: Digital: 27 (UHF); Virtual: 20
- Branding: Fox 20 KFNB Casper; MeTV Wyoming (20.2)

Programming
- Subchannels: see KFNB

Ownership
- Owner: Coastal Television Broadcasting Company; (FRTV License LLC)
- Sister stations: KFNB, KGWC-TV, KTWO-TV

History
- Founded: June 15, 1995
- First air date: July 17, 1997
- Former call signs: K26ES (1997–2014); K27LZ-D (2012–2013); KWYF-LD (2013–2026)
- Former channel numbers: Analog: 26 (UHF, 1997–2014)
- Former affiliations: Fox (via KLWY, 1997–2004); UPN (1997–2006, secondary until 2004); Pax (secondary, c. 2004); The CW (2006–2015)

Technical information
- Licensing authority: FCC
- Facility ID: 190191
- ERP: 3.3 kW
- Transmitter coordinates: 42°44′26.0″N 106°21′34.0″W

Links
- Public license information: LMS
- Website: yourwyominglink.com

K27PT-D (channel 20) is a low-power television station in Casper, Wyoming, United States. It is a translator of Fox affiliate KFNB (channel 20), which is owned by Coastal Television Broadcasting Company. K27PT-D's transmitter is located atop Casper Mountain.

== History ==
A construction permit to construct a low-power television station on UHF channel 26 in Casper was granted on June 15, 1995, and issued the call sign K26ES. Original owner Charles W. Swaner sold K26ES to Wyomedia Corporation on September 15, 1997; the new owners applied for a license to cover on October 29, 1997, and was granted it on January 28, 1998. Initially, K26ES served as a translator of KLWY in Cheyenne; this brought Fox programming to Casper, along with a secondary affiliation with UPN. The station, by then referring to itself as "KWYF," began producing a 9 p.m. newscast on November 3, 2003. On March 8, 2004, K26ES became a full-time UPN affiliate after Fox programming was moved to KFNB; for a time after this change, the station also carried some programming from Pax. Wyomedia also transferred K26ES's newscast to KFNB. When UPN and The WB closed to form The CW in 2006, K26ES became the new network's Casper affiliate.

On March 27, 2012, Wyomedia was granted a construction permit for a digital companion channel for K26ES to operate on channel 27; this facility was issued the call sign K27LZ-D. K27LZ-D filed for its license to cover on June 15, 2012 and was granted it on July 16; on June 13, 2013, the call letters were changed to KWYF-LD. The analog K26ES license remained active until September 12, 2014, when it was canceled by the Federal Communications Commission (FCC).

On January 26, 2015, KWYF became a MeTV affiliate. In addition to airing programming from MeTV, it also airs programming from MyNetworkTV from 7 p.m.-9 p.m. weeknights.

Wyomedia Corporation agreed to sell its stations, including KWYF-LD, to Legacy Broadcasting on February 8, 2018. The sale was canceled on October 2, 2018.

On October 8, 2019, Wyomedia announced that it would sell its stations to Front Range Television, a subsidiary of Coastal Television Broadcasting Company (run by Bill Fielder). This sale was concurrent with Coastal's purchase of KFNB, the sale of KTWO-TV to Vision Alaska, LLC, and the sale of KGWC-TV to Big Horn Television. The sale was completed on June 1, 2020.

By April 2022, the station began airing newscasts from the Coastal-owned and partly-centralized News Hub, recently acquired from Waypoint Media.

On March 5, 2026, the station's call sign changed to K27PT-D. This came as the FCC made a new rule requiring translator stations to have translator station call signs.

== Subchannels ==
The station's signal is multiplexed:

Subchannels of K27PT-D
Subchannel	Res.	Short name	Programming
20.1	720p	KFNB	Simulcast of KFNB / Fox
20.2	480i	KWYF	MyNetworkTV / MeTV
