= KSPR-TV (Wyoming) =

Television station in Casper, Wyoming (1957–1959)

- Casper, Wyoming; United States
- Channels: Analog: 6 (VHF)

Programming
- Affiliations: CBS

Ownership
- Owner: KSPR (AM)

History
- First air date: August 12, 1957
- Last air date: July 21, 1959

KSPR-TV (channel 6) was a television station in Casper, Wyoming, United States, which operated from 1957 to 1959. The station was owned by radio station KSPR (1470 AM). The station closed as a result of competition from a local cable system; it would be more than 20 years before a second commercial station opened in Casper.

== History ==
The station went on the air August 12, 1957 as a CBS affiliate, matching the radio station, the only CBS radio outlet in the state of Wyoming. Coinciding with the launch of the television station, KSPR radio and TV moved into new quarters on East Second Street.

By July 1959, reports were circulating that KSPR-TV would close before year's end, and the fuel on the fire only accelerated when Rocky Mountain Tele Stations, owner of KTWO-TV (channel 2), announced it would buy KSPR radio from their common owner, Don Hathaway, for $150,000. The rumors were true, and KSPR-TV ceased broadcasting July 21, 1959, despite a well-regarded slate of programming.

Owner Hathaway would blame cable television for the demise of KSPR-TV. Within less than a year of going on air, the station stated to the Federal Communications Commission that cable had made it harder to get programs and the station might have been off the air even then without the financial support of KSPR radio. In December 1959, the United States Senate subcommittee on communications held a hearing in Casper, at which Hathaway testified that the local cable firm, Able Cable (Community Television, Inc.), had made the sale of advertising difficult by importing Denver stations; this prompted national advertisers, including the Campbell Soup Company, to avoid buying air time on channel 6, which the cable did not carry. In his testimony, Hathaway noted that the cable system, which had 6,000 subscribers prior to the launch of KTWO-TV, had dropped to 3,500 when KSPR-TV took to the air and was growing again with Casper back to one local outlet. KTWO purchased the KSPR building and moved the television station in; Hathaway sold additional equipment to Community Television, whose owner, Bill Daniels, planned to use it to start a television station at Farmington, New Mexico.

After KSPR-TV ceased broadcasting, KTWO-TV proposed the removal of channel 6 to Lander for use as a satellite station. This did not take place, though KTWO made a second and even more daring proposal. It proposed the creation of the first commercial television duopoly in the United States by activating channel 6, saying a second independent station was not viable and that it could air more network programs on a second channel.

The Natrona County school board voted in 1961 to seek use of the channel for educational use. A further commercial application was made in 1964 by Duhamel Broadcasting Enterprises, owner of KOTA-TV in Rapid City, South Dakota. In 1965, the channel was officially allocated noncommercial and the state launched a bid to put it and channel 8 at Laramie on the air.

No facility materialized on channel 6 until December 1981, when Casper College activated a translator for public station KRMA in Denver on channel 6. In 1987, the translator switched from airing KRMA to KCWC, the new public station in Riverton that had signed on in 1983. It was replaced with a full-service license as KPTW in 2007.
