= Clareton, Wyoming =

Town in Wyoming, United States

Coordinates: 43°42′02″N 104°41′33″W

Clareton is located in the southern part of Weston County, Wyoming, United States, one mile south of State Highway 450. It is within the boundaries of the Thunder Basin National Grassland. The Clareton Oil Field is located south and east of Clareton.

The town of Clareton was first settled by Clarence Arthur Townsend (1892–1952) and his family, hence the name Clareton. Clarence built the Grange hall where the store and post office were included.

== Climate ==
Rochelle 7ENE is a weather station near Clareton. Rochelle has a humid continental climate (Köppen Dfb), bordering on a cold semi-arid climate (Köppen BSk).

Climate data for Rochelle 7ENE, Wyoming, 1991–2020 normals, 1928–2023 extremes: 4239ft (1292m)
Month	Jan	Feb	Mar	Apr	May	Jun	Jul	Aug	Sep	Oct	Nov	Dec	Year
Record high °F (°C)	65 (18)	70 (21)	81 (27)	91 (33)	98 (37)	106 (41)	107 (42)	105 (41)	103 (39)	92 (33)	79 (26)	72 (22)	107 (42)
Mean maximum °F (°C)	52.1 (11.2)	56.0 (13.3)	65.6 (18.7)	75.9 (24.4)	83.2 (28.4)	95.3 (35.2)	101.5 (38.6)	99.6 (37.6)	92.5 (33.6)	80.2 (26.8)	63.4 (17.4)	51.3 (10.7)	100.5 (38.1)
Mean daily maximum °F (°C)	34.4 (1.3)	36.8 (2.7)	47.4 (8.6)	57.2 (14.0)	65.6 (18.7)	78.2 (25.7)	90.0 (32.2)	87.8 (31.0)	77.1 (25.1)	61.8 (16.6)	46.1 (7.8)	34.6 (1.4)	59.8 (15.4)
Daily mean °F (°C)	21.1 (−6.1)	23.5 (−4.7)	32.5 (0.3)	41.8 (5.4)	51.2 (10.7)	61.9 (16.6)	71.3 (21.8)	68.9 (20.5)	58.1 (14.5)	44.2 (6.8)	30.9 (−0.6)	21.7 (−5.7)	43.9 (6.6)
Mean daily minimum °F (°C)	7.9 (−13.4)	10.2 (−12.1)	17.7 (−7.9)	26.3 (−3.2)	36.8 (2.7)	45.6 (7.6)	52.7 (11.5)	49.9 (9.9)	39.1 (3.9)	26.5 (−3.1)	15.7 (−9.1)	8.8 (−12.9)	28.1 (−2.2)
Mean minimum °F (°C)	−15.3 (−26.3)	−13.8 (−25.4)	−2.7 (−19.3)	11.9 (−11.2)	23.7 (−4.6)	34.4 (1.3)	41.5 (5.3)	40.6 (4.8)	23.6 (−4.7)	11.2 (−11.6)	−6.0 (−21.1)	−20.7 (−29.3)	−27.7 (−33.2)
Record low °F (°C)	−45 (−43)	−39 (−39)	−32 (−36)	−14 (−26)	6 (−14)	27 (−3)	31 (−1)	29 (−2)	9 (−13)	−12 (−24)	−31 (−35)	−47 (−44)	−47 (−44)
Average precipitation inches (mm)	0.32 (8.1)	0.45 (11)	0.77 (20)	2.03 (52)	2.46 (62)	2.43 (62)	2.52 (64)	0.99 (25)	0.76 (19)	1.14 (29)	0.44 (11)	0.30 (7.6)	14.61 (370.7)
Average snowfall inches (cm)	4.3 (11)	7.1 (18)	6.8 (17)	5.9 (15)	0.6 (1.5)	0.0 (0.0)	0.0 (0.0)	0.0 (0.0)	0.6 (1.5)	2.8 (7.1)	6.2 (16)	6.5 (17)	40.8 (104.1)
Source 1: NOAA (1981-2010 snowfall)
Source 2: XMACIS (records & monthly max/mins)
