= KGWC-TV =

Television station in Casper, Wyoming

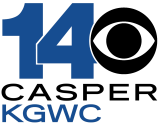
- Casper, Wyoming; United States
- Channels: Digital: 14 (UHF); Virtual: 14
- Branding: CBS 14 KGWC Casper; Your Wyoming Link (newscasts)

Programming
- Affiliations: 14.1: CBS; 14.2: ABC (KTWO-TV)

Ownership
- Owner: Big Horn Television LLC; (BHTV License LLC)
- Operator: Coastal Television Broadcasting Company LLC
- Sister stations: KFNB, KTWO-TV

History
- First air date: August 12, 1980
- Former call signs: KCWY-TV (1980–1986)
- Former channel numbers: Analog: 14 (UHF, 1980–2009); Digital: 15 (UHF, 2002–2009)
- Call sign meaning: Great Western Network/Casper, after former sister station KGWN-TV

Technical information
- Licensing authority: FCC
- Facility ID: 63177
- ERP: 53.3 kW
- HAAT: 562 m (1,844 ft)
- Transmitter coordinates: 42°44′26″N 106°21′36″W

Links
- Public license information: Public file; LMS
- Website: yourwyominglink.com

KGWC-TV (channel 14) is a television station in Casper, Wyoming, United States, affiliated with CBS. It is owned by Big Horn Television LLC and operated by Coastal Television Broadcasting Company LLC alongside Fox affiliate KFNB (channel 20) and ABC affiliate KTWO-TV (channel 2). The stations share studios on Skyview Drive in Casper, while KGWC-TV's transmitter is located atop Casper Mountain. KGWC-TV is rebroadcast on two satellite stations in western Wyoming: KGWL-TV (channel 5) in Lander and KGWR-TV (channel 13) in Rock Springs (part of the Salt Lake City market).

Channel 14 began broadcasting as KCWY-TV—no relation to the present station with that call sign—in August 1980. Its debut marked the first time Casper had competing television stations since 1959; the new station struggled against dominant KTWO-TV in the ratings. The Lander and Rock Springs stations were put on the air in 1982; the Rock Springs station had previously operated on a standalone basis in the late 1970s but was off the air. The local Chrysostom Corporation sold the stations to Stauffer Communications in 1986; the stations received their present call letters and became dependent on KGWN-TV in Cheyenne for most of their news programming. Under the ownership of Benedek Broadcasting in the late 1990s, full local newscasts from Casper resumed, though staff turnover prompted Benedek to discontinue the local operation once more in 2000.

When Benedek declared bankruptcy in 2002, KGWC-TV was sold to a hedge fund which separated it from the Cheyenne station by selling them to separate buyers. The general manager of KFNB, Mark Nalbone, acquired KGWC-TV and used the resources of KTWO-TV, which he also managed, to run channel 14. Nalbone tried to sell the station's assets and CBS affiliation to Gray Television in 2018 but was denied by federal authorities. The Nalbone-owned and managed stations were then sold to their present owners in 2020.

== History ==
=== Early years ===
The Chrysostom Corporation, a group of five investors that included the Casper police chief, was formed in 1977 to apply for a license to build a station on channel 14 in Casper. The Federal Communications Commission (FCC) approved the application on August 31, 1979, and KCWY-TV began broadcasting on August 12, 1980. Channel 14, which has been affiliated with CBS since its launch, was the first new television station to go on the air in Casper since 1957 and marked the first time the city had two competing stations since 1959, when KSPR-TV folded. It also was Wyoming's first UHF television station.

The new station entered into a tough years-long battle with KTWO-TV, the other station in town. Channel 14 found itself at a constant disadvantage against the longer-established station. In its first ratings book, its Action News newscasts attracted two percent of the audience, compared to KTWO's 59 percent. KTWO trumpeted that it aired all 50 of the top 50 programs in Casper.

Undaunted, Chrysostom then began a push to build full-power satellites of KCWY. It filed for the open channel 4 at Lander, Wyoming, which put it in competition with Central Wyoming College's application to build the first educational television station in the state. Channel 5 was found to be available, and both groups received channels. Chrysostom put KOWY on the air in Lander in 1982. At the same time, it bought KTUX-TV—a station on channel 13 in Rock Springs that had signed on October 21, 1977, but was silent—and renamed it KWWY-TV.

=== Sale to Stauffer ===
The Chrysostom Corporation sold KCWY-TV and its satellites to Stauffer Communications of Topeka, Kansas, in 1986 for $3.5 million. At the same time, Stauffer bought KYCU, the CBS affiliate in Cheyenne. On New Year's Day 1987, the stations adopted new call letters of KGWC-TV, KGWL-TV (Lander), and KGWR-TV (Rock Springs), matching the Cheyenne station, which became KGWN-TV, representing the "Great Western Network". The KCWY call letters later returned to Casper on channel 13.

Under Stauffer, cuts were made to the operation in Casper to reduce costs, respond to the weak regional economy, and take advantage of synergies with the Cheyenne station. In early 1987, the station ceased producing its own local weathercasts and began taking legislative and state capitol reports from KGWN; it cut its news department from 11 reporters down to 8. Even deeper cutbacks followed the next year, eliminating additional news positions in Casper; KGWC switched to producing local news and weather inserts into KGWN's newscasts from Cheyenne. The switch would have been made in late 1987 but was derailed by problems in relaying the KGWN signal to Casper.

=== Benedek revival ===
In 1995, Stauffer sold its holdings to Morris Communications. Morris kept the newspapers and spun off the television stations to Benedek Broadcasting of Rockford, Illinois, for $60 million.

Benedek poured considerable resources into KGWC, relaunching a full schedule of newscasts. Channel 14 increased the visibility of its product, running billboards and TV advertisements for its newscasts. In December 1996, it poached Rich Bircumshaw from KTWO radio to serve as the news director and KTWO-TV news director Vicki Daniels as assignment editor. It added weekend newscasts and doubled its staff. Benedek leased an electronics store building on CY Avenue to serve as the station's studios and outfitted it with $500,000 in new equipment, improving the technical quality of its broadcasts.

However, the product failed to be viable in the long run for Benedek. The news department's size slowly shrank, and the station had three general managers in less than two years. On June 4, 2000, the station turned into a satellite of KGWN with no local newscasts or advertising. All but two KGWC staffers were laid off; only an engineer and one other staffer—the bare minimum to run the station—were retained. KGWN-TV general manager Mike DeLier, who was also Benedek's regional vice president for the Cheyenne and Casper markets, said that despite good ratings, poor personnel and "management problems" required rebuilding the station from scratch. Benedek vowed to restore local news but did not give a timetable.

=== Chelsey ownership and sale to Mark III Media ===
After the closure of the KGWC-TV operation, financial problems developed at Benedek. The early 2000s recession reduced ad sales and caused the company to miss interest payments on a set of bonds issued in 1996, prompting a filing for Chapter 11 bankruptcy. While most of Benedek's stations were sold to Gray Television, some—including KGWC-TV and KGWN-TV—went to Chelsey Broadcasting, an affiliate of the Chelsey Capital hedge fund.

In 2003, Chelsey Broadcasting divested its Wyoming stations in two separate sales. KGWN and Scottsbluff, Nebraska, satellite KSTF were sold to SagamoreHill Broadcasting, while KGWC, KGWL, and KGWR were sold separately to Mark III Media, headed by Mark Nalbone, general manager of Casper Fox affiliate KFNB. Nalbone also served as a consultant to KTWO-TV. The sale languished during a lengthy approval process at the FCC due to several objections, primarily concerning whether the sale would effectively put the stations under common ownership with KFNB and KTWO-TV. James Cable, the parent of the cable system serving Douglas, Wyoming, wrote in its objection, "To paraphrase Shakespeare, something is rotten in the state of Wyoming". Equity Broadcasting Corporation also objected to the arrangement but withdrew its protest shortly before selling KTWO-TV to the company consulted by Nalbone, leaving James wondering whether Equity had been truthful in stating it did not receive any compensation for withdrawing the objection. Mark III programmed KGWC separately from KGWN under a time brokerage agreement.

Mark III resurrected a local newscast in 2004, using reporting resources shared with KTWO-TV. KTWO sponsored an "Anchorman for a Day" contest, which was won by Marvin Nolte, a retired man from Bar Nunn with no previous broadcasting experience; he wound up getting a permanent position after one of KGWC-TV's anchors moved to Cheyenne. However, the program failed to make headway in the ratings against KTWO and KCWY, which had begun a local newscast in 2003; as a result, KGWC canceled the newscast on January 3, 2006.

=== Gray sale attempt and sale to Big Horn ===
Mark III Media announced the sale of KGWC-TV to Gray Television, owner of KCWY-DT and KGWN, on February 12, 2018. Under the terms of the deal, the KGWC license was to be donated to a non-profit organization and would receive a new call sign and virtual channel number; on March 6, Gray agreed to donate the license and transmitter to Central Wyoming College. Central Wyoming College planned to convert channel 14 into a non-commercial license as KEWY, with the station being used to broadcast PBS Kids programming full-time.

Gray would have retained the KGWC call letters and CBS programming, moving them to its low power KCBZ-LD, formerly KSBF-LD (channel 36); per the donation agreement, KCBZ-LD was to have taken the virtual channel 14 to maintain CBS programming on channel 14. Gray would have acquired and retained KGWR-TV and KGWL-TV. The sale of KGWC-TV and its satellites was canceled in October 2018; on January 24, 2019, Gray disclosed that its acquisition of the CBS affiliation had been blocked by the Department of Justice (DOJ). This came primarily because the DOJ regarded KGWL in Lander as a Casper station, and Casper had too few stations to legally permit an outright television duopoly.

On October 8, 2019, Mark III Media announced that it would sell KGWC-TV and its satellites to Big Horn Television, run by Michael Hogan; the sale was concurrent with Vision Alaska's purchase of KTWO-TV and Coastal Television Broadcasting Company's purchase of KFNB. The sale was completed on June 1, 2020.

== Technical information ==
=== Repeaters ===
==== Satellite stations ====
Satellite stations of KGWC-TV
Station	City of license	Channel	First air date	Former call signs	ERP	HAAT	Facility ID	Transmitter coordinates	Public license information
KGWL-TV	Lander	7 (VHF); Virtual: 5	September 1982 (Note: The Broadcasting and Cable Yearbook says September 10, while the Television and Cable Factbook says September 12.)	KOWY (1982–1986)	14.3 kW	113 m (371 ft)	63162	42°53′42.8″N 108°43′36.4″W	Public file; LMS
KGWR-TV	Rock Springs	13 (VHF); Virtual: 13	October 21, 1977	KTUX-TV (1977–1982); KWWY-TV (1982–1986)	14.2 kW	495 m (1,624 ft)	63170	41°26′20.8″N 109°6′44.4″W	Public file; LMS

==== Translators ====
The signal of KGWC-TV (or its satellites) is rebroadcast over the following translators:

- Big Piney, etc.: K32JN-D
- Bondurant: K17JZ-D (KGWR-TV)
- Clareton: K28KM-D
- Douglas: K11RN-D
- Gillette: K16AE-D
- Pinedale: K18JA-D
- Sheridan: K26LW-D
- Shoshoni: K13NZ-D
- Wyodak: K30MX-D

=== Subchannels ===
The stations' signals are multiplexed:

Subchannels of KGWC-TV, KGWL-TV, and KGWR-TV
Subchannel			Res.	Short name			Programming
KGWC-TV	KGWL-TV	KGWR-TV	Res.	KGWC-TV	KGWL-TV	KGWR-TV	Programming
14.1	5.1	13.1	1080i	KGWC	KGWL-DT	KGWR	CBS
14.2	5.2	13.2	480i	KTWO	KTWO-SD	KTWO	ABC (KTWO-TV) in SD (4:3)
14.3	—N/a	13.3	480i	COURT T	—N/a	COURT T	Court TV
14.4	—N/a	13.4	480i	Mystery	—N/a	Mystery	Ion Mystery

Simulcast of subchannels of another station

=== Analog-to-digital transition ===
KGWL and KGWR began broadcasting digital television service by February 2009, when they ceased analog service. KGWC had operated a digital signal on channel 15 for some time before then but moved it to channel 14 after shutting down its analog transmitter.
