= KFNB =

Television station in Casper, Wyoming

- Casper, Wyoming; United States
- Channels: Digital: 20 (UHF); Virtual: 20
- Branding: Fox 20 KFNB Casper; MeTV Wyoming (20.2); Your Wyoming Link (newscasts)

Programming
- Affiliations: 20.1: Fox; 20.2: MyNetworkTV and MeTV

Ownership
- Owner: Coastal Television Broadcasting Company LLC; (FRTV License LLC)
- Sister stations: K27PT-D, KTWO-TV, KGWC-TV

History
- First air date: October 31, 1984
- Former call signs: KXWY-TV (1984–1986)
- Former affiliations: NBC (partial, 1984–1986); ABC (partial 1984–1986, primary 1986–1989 and 1990–2004); Dark (1989–1990)
- Call sign meaning: First National Broadcasting, abortive owner in the late 1980s

Technical information
- Licensing authority: FCC
- Facility ID: 74256
- ERP: 52.4 kW
- HAAT: 560 m (1,837 ft)
- Transmitter coordinates: 42°44′26″N 106°21′36″W
- Translator(s): K09XL-D Douglas; K27PT-D Casper

Links
- Public license information: Public file; LMS
- Website: yourwyominglink.com

KFNB (channel 20) is a television station in Casper, Wyoming, United States, affiliated with the Fox network. It is owned by Coastal Television Broadcasting Company LLC and operated alongside ABC affiliate KTWO-TV (channel 2) and CBS affiliate KGWC-TV (channel 14). The stations share studios on Skyview Drive in Casper, while KFNB's transmitter is located atop Casper Mountain south of the city. Satellite stations at Rawlins and Riverton, and a translator in Douglas extend KFNB's signal. Most of its programming is also rebroadcast on KLWY (channel 27) in Cheyenne, which airs separate station identifications and commercials.

Channel 20 began broadcasting as Casper's third TV station in 1984. Financial difficulties dominated the station's early history. Between 1986 and 1989, First National Broadcasting attempted to buy the station, a sale that languished and eventually fell apart, with the station leaving the air. After being sold at sheriff's auction, the station began broadcasting again in 1990. An ABC affiliate for most of its history, it switched to Fox as part of a three-station affiliation exchange in 2004. Coastal acquired KFNB in 2020.

== History ==
=== Early years as KXWY-TV ===
Channel 20 began broadcasting October 31, 1984, as KXWY-TV; transmitter delays pushed back its planned launch. The station carried partial affiliations with both NBC and ABC. The primary carrier for ABC and some NBC shows was KTWO-TV, which held first-call rights to NBC programming but did not air all of it; the new channel 20 would carry The Today Show, soap operas and game shows from NBC, among others. KXWY-TV was owned by Channel 20 Casper, Inc., whose main investor was A. J. Stanton of Orlando, Florida. The new station immediately made plans to go regional, merging with affiliated Hi Ho Broadcasting, owners of KFWY-TV (channel 10, previously KTNW) in Riverton and Thermopolis, and planning to start up a new satellite station at Rawlins. KTNW had previously opened a channel 20 translator in Casper in August 1980, which launched the same day as KCWY-TV (channel 14, not to be confused with the current KCWY-DT); both were Casper's first UHF television services. The station offered little local news at the outset, producing and airing an insert into the Independent Network News.

The new station faced financial headwinds from the start. By June 1985, it had endured the disconnection of its telephones and was in the middle of a stock ownership dispute that left it undercapitalized. In September, less than a year after starting up, KXWY-TV announced that it would be sold, along with KFWY-TV and the under-construction station at Rawlins (KRWY-TV), to a new company, First National Broadcasting. First National was a subsidiary of First National Entertainment, a movie and television production company.

While the sale itself would languish for years, First National's hand in management and resources immediately became apparent in a series of major changes that took place in 1986. Significant events started just after the new year: that January, the station relocated from its original Salt Creek Highway studio base to Skyview Drive and upgraded its Casper Mountain transmitter from 19,000 to 68,000 watts. The power increase was vital, as it allowed KXWY-TV to reach two-thirds as many homes as KCWY-TV. That meant it qualified under the 1971 "Raleigh rule" of the Federal Communications Commission (FCC) for an exclusive network affiliation. KTWO-TV, which was affiliated with both ABC and NBC, chose the stronger NBC network, leaving ABC to hook up with channel 20. In May, KXWY-TV began its first full-fledged local news service, replacing the INN cut-ins, which were reliant on video news releases, with 30-minute news programs seen at 6 and 10 p.m. weeknights and produced by a staff of four. The next month, it announced plans for a second transmitter power upgrade to 1.35 million watts and the addition of low-power translators in Douglas and Gillette. In time for the network change, and evidently reflecting the station's planned future ownership, KXWY-TV and its satellite stations became KFNB, KFNE (in Riverton), and KFNR (in Rawlins) in August 1986.

=== The long, abortive First National sale ===
Trouble arose again in May 1987, when 26 station employees threatened to walk out on the job; the general manager attributed the payroll issues to the lengthy close of the sale to First National. Only three, however, made good and left the station. An agreement in principle on the sale was finally reached in June; at that time, the local news was temporarily suspended.

However, channel 20 still had not actually been sold by 1988, when the Wyoming Division of Unemployment Insurance began a proceeding to obtain $66,000 in unpaid back taxes from KFNB. Early that year, Mark Nalbone became the new general manager; by that time, First National had been paying all of KFNB's expenses for more than two years to keep the station afloat. However, the sale continued to be delayed. Events came to a head when the station went dark on April 18, 1989; while KFNB officials claimed transmitter trouble, a reporter for the station announced it had laid off all of its staff. Ten days later, the Division of Unemployment Insurance ordered the station to cease operations for failure to pay back taxes. The Division had won judgments against Channel 20 Casper in 1987 and 1988 for back taxes and interest, and was empowered to force the station out of business under state unemployment security laws.

Over the next several months, the station's ownership and financial disarray were laid bare in court. Channel 20 Casper, Inc., owned by Stanton, and two First National subsidiaries had received $850,000 in loans from the Marvin Engineering Co., secured by KFNB's assets, then proceeded to default on the loans on June 1. Several weeks later, the loans were assigned to Wyomedia Corporation, headed by California businessman Marvin Gussman. Wyomedia filed to foreclose on the station and place it in the receivership of general manager Mark Nalbone. Meanwhile, Stanton resigned from Channel 20 Casper and its sister company, Heart of Wyoming Television, which held a construction permit for channel 27 at Cheyenne. A sheriff's auction was ordered, at which Wyomedia bought the station's assets and license for $20,000.

=== Wyomedia era and affiliation with Fox ===
Under Wyomedia management, KFNB returned to the air nine months later on January 23, 1990, continuing as the local ABC affiliate. Wyomedia then applied to receive the licenses from Nalbone in his capacity as receiver; the Division of Unemployment filed a petition to deny, which the FCC dismissed alongside a petition by other creditors of First National in December 1991. Although KFNB and its satellites now had stable ownership and were free of the debt accumulated during the abortive First National sale, they did not offer any local news. First National ended up with new licenses to replace those held by Stanton's interests for KFNE and KFNR; Wyomedia acquired the pair in 2007 for $30,000 in total debt forgiveness.

KFNB became a secondary affiliate of Fox in 1994, airing prime time programming in off hours and its Sunday football games. Three years later, Wyomedia acquired low-power TV station K26ES and relaunched it as "KWYF", branded as "Wyoming's Fox TV"; however, channel 20 continued to maintain a secondary affiliation with Fox.

The arrival of new television station KCWY-TV (channel 13) in 2003 brought with it a new NBC affiliate. Because of KCWY owner Sunbelt Communications's strong ties with NBC, KCWY-TV picked up the affiliation from KTWO-TV as soon as channel 2's contract with NBC expired. KTWO-TV then signed an ABC affiliation agreement in June 2003, though it was not slated to become the ABC affiliate in Casper until KFNB's ABC agreement ended on June 5, 2004. The switch was moved up to March 8, 2004; at that time, KFNB became a full-time Fox affiliate and KWYF became the new home of UPN and Pax programming in Casper. The KWYF 9 p.m. local newscast, which had been established months earlier, migrated to KFNB.

Wyomedia acquired effective operational control of KTWO-TV and KGWC-TV in 2004 when Nalbone became a consultant to KTWO-TV and KGWC-TV was sold to Mark III Media, a company 30 percent controlled by Nalbone; the stations moved into KFNB's offices.

=== Sale attempt and completed sale ===
Wyomedia Corporation agreed to sell its stations to Legacy Broadcasting on February 8, 2018. The deal would have created a duopoly between KFNB and KTWO-TV, which Legacy would have concurrently acquired from Silverton Broadcasting Company; in its filing with the FCC, Legacy stated that the duopoly was permissible because KFNB was the fifth-ranked station in the Casper–Riverton market, trailing sister station KWYF-LD as well as KTWO, KCWY-DT, and KGWC-TV. The sale was canceled on October 2, 2018.

On October 8, 2019, Wyomedia announced that it would sell its stations to Front Range Television, a subsidiary of Coastal Television Broadcasting Company (run by Bill Fielder); the sale was concurrent with Big Horn Television's purchase of KGWC-TV and Vision Alaska's purchase of KTWO-TV. Coastal Television and Vision Alaska (run by Stephen Brissette) already jointly operated stations in Alaska. The sale was completed on June 1, 2020.

== Technical information ==
The stations' signals are multiplexed:

=== KFNB subchannels ===
Subchannels of KFNB
Subchannel	Res.	Short name	Programming
20.1	720p	KFNB	Fox
20.2	480i	KWYF	MyNetworkTV/MeTV

=== KFNE/KFNR subchannels ===
Subchannels of KFNE and KFNR
Subchannel		Res.	Short name		Programming
KFNE	KFNR	Res.	KFNE	KFNR	Programming
10.1	11.1	720p	KFNE	KFNR	Fox
10.2	11.2	480i	KTWO-SD		ABC

=== Repeaters ===
==== Satellite stations ====
Two full-power satellite stations rebroadcast KFNB's main subchannel (but not the KWYF subchannel), as well as a subchannel carrying co-managed KTWO-TV. They have been associated with channel 20 since 1984 and 1986, respectively. One of the stations, KFNE at Riverton, is older than KFNB by nearly 27 years, having begun operations as KWRB-TV from a base in Thermopolis in December 1957.

Technical information for KFNE and KFNR
Station	City of license	Channels (RF / VC)	First air date	ERP	HAAT	Facility ID	Transmitter coordinates	Public license information
KFNE	Riverton	10 (VHF); 10	December 22, 1957	11.3 kW	526 m (1,726 ft)	21613	43°27′25.8″N 108°12′4.3″W	Public file LMS
KFNR	Rawlins	9 (VHF); 11	April 16, 1986	0.978 kW	51.1 m (168 ft)	21612	41°46′15.7″N 107°14′16.9″W	Public file LMS

==== Translators ====
Translators of KFNB
City of license	Callsign	Translating	Channel	ERP	HAAT	Facility ID	Transmitter coordinates
Casper	K27PT-D	KFNB	27	3.3 kW	557 m (1,827 ft)	190191	42°44′26″N 106°21′36″W
Douglas	K09XL-D	KFNB	9	0.057 kW	9 m (30 ft)	130278	42°45′47″N 105°25′14.6″W
