= KTWO-TV =

Television station in Casper, Wyoming

- Casper, Wyoming; United States
- Channels: Digital: 17 (UHF); Virtual: 2
- Branding: ABC 2 KTWO Casper; Your Wyoming Link (newscasts)

Programming
- Affiliations: 2.1: ABC; for others, see § Subchannels

Ownership
- Owner: Vision Alaska Television Holdings; (VW License LLC)
- Operator: Coastal Television Broadcasting Company LLC
- Sister stations: KFNB, KGWC-TV

History
- First air date: March 1, 1957
- Former channel numbers: Analog: 2 (VHF, 1957–2009)
- Former affiliations: NBC (primary 1957–1978 and 1986–2003; secondary 1978–1986); CBS (secondary, 1959–1980); The WB (secondary, 1995–1998); Independent (2003–2004); Pax TV (secondary, 2003–2004); NewsNet (secondary, 2020–2024)
- Call sign meaning: Channel 2

Technical information
- Licensing authority: FCC
- Facility ID: 18286
- ERP: 52.9 kW
- HAAT: 560 m (1,837 ft)
- Transmitter coordinates: 42°44′26″N 106°21′36″W
- Translator(s): see § Translators

Links
- Public license information: Public file; LMS
- Website: yourwyominglink.com

KTWO-TV (channel 2) is a television station in Casper, Wyoming, United States, affiliated with ABC. It is owned by Vision Alaska LLC and operated by Coastal Television Broadcasting Company LLC alongside Fox affiliate KFNB (channel 20) and CBS affiliate KGWC-TV (channel 14). The three stations share studios on Skyview Drive in Casper; KTWO-TV's transmitter is located atop Casper Mountain.

KTWO-TV is also available on a network of UHF and VHF translators across the state. It is also available on the second digital subchannel of KGWC and its satellites and translators; as well as the second digital subchannels of KFNB satellites KFNE and KFNR (but not KFNB itself). Under previous owner Equity Broadcasting, it had also been available on a free-to-air satellite uplink (as with all of Equity's stations, hubbed out of Little Rock, Arkansas, and sent to the transmitter via FTA satellite) until Equity went bankrupt and the satellite was sold.

KKTQ-LD (channel 16) in Cheyenne operates as a semi-satellite of KTWO-TV.

== History ==
KTWO-TV began test broadcasts on March 1, 1957 and started its official schedule on March 8, 1957; it was owned by Harriscope Inc., and was a primary NBC affiliate with a secondary ABC affiliation. A secondary CBS affiliation was added in 1959, after the shutdown of previous CBS affiliate KSPR-TV (channel 6); KTWO's owners also purchased KSPR radio (then at 1470 AM; now at 1030 AM), a longtime CBS Radio affiliate, and changed its call sign to KTWO to match its new television sister. In October 1959, KTWO-TV moved its studios to KTWO radio.

In March 1978, after 21 years as a primary NBC affiliate, ABC announced that KTWO-TV would become a primary affiliate effective September 5; this was around the same time that ABC became the nation's highest rated network. The station lost CBS to KCWY-TV (channel 14, now KGWC-TV) when it signed on in 1980. In 1984, another new station, KXWY-TV (channel 20), began carrying NBC programming not cleared by KTWO. In early 1986, KTWO agreed to once again become a primary NBC affiliate effective September 1; the ABC affiliation went to KXWY (now KFNB). Later that year, Harriscope sold KTWO-TV, along with KULR-TV in Billings, Montana, to Dix Communications for $12.2 million. On August 28, 1987, Dix signed on KKTU (channel 33) as a satellite of KTWO-TV.

In 1994, Dix sold KTWO-TV and KKTU, along with KAAL-TV in Austin, Minnesota, to Eastern Broadcasting for $13 million. For a time starting in 1995, KTWO and KKTU had a secondary affiliation with The WB. Eastern sold its stations—KTWO-TV and KKTU, KAAL-TV, and KODE-TV in Joplin, Missouri—to Grapevine Communications for $40 million in 1997; Grapevine merged with GOCOM Communications to form GOCOM Holdings in 1999. Equity Broadcasting bought KTWO-TV and KKTU for $3.5 million in 2001.

=== Becoming an ABC affiliate ===
On September 1, 2003, the NBC affiliation in Casper moved from KTWO to KCWY (channel 13). Equity had known at the time it acquired the station that the NBC affiliation would expire; in preparation for the move, on June 27, 2003, KTWO-TV announced that it had agreed to affiliate with ABC, and that the new affiliation would not take effect until the expiration of ABC's contract with KFNB on June 5, 2004. In the interim, KTWO operated as an independent station, but carried programming from Pax TV (now Ion Television), including Candid Camera and Miracle Pets; before the affiliation change, Pax programming had been seen on KCWY. Cheyenne satellite station KKTU was able to immediately switch from NBC to ABC, and began branding itself as "ABC 8", after its position on the Cheyenne cable system. After reaching an agreement with KTWO, KFNB agreed to end its ABC affiliation early; on March 8, 2004, KTWO officially became an ABC affiliate, KFNB obtained the Fox affiliation from K26ES (now K27PT-D) and K26ES became an affiliate of UPN and Pax.

Coinciding with the affiliation switch, on March 1, 2004, K-TWO TV of Wyoming, controlled by Cheryl Kaupp, began operating KTWO-TV under a local marketing agreement, and that October filed to purchase the station outright from Equity Broadcasting for $1.7 million. Kaupp was the daughter of Marvin Gussman, whose Wyomedia Corporation owned KFNB; Wyomedia's general manager, Mark Nalbone, served as a consultant to KTWO and owned a thirty-percent interest in Mark III Media, which was in the process of acquiring KGWC-TV, though in December 2005 he told Television Business Report that he did not speak for KTWO in retransmission consent negotiations. In April 2004, Nalbone announced that KTWO would vacate its longtime studios on East Second Street in Casper; its present location shares operations with KFNB, KWYF, and KGWC on Skyview Drive. K-TWO TV of Wyoming assigned its right to acquire KTWO-TV to Silverton Broadcasting, headed by Barry Silverton, in May 2005; Silverton completed the purchase on May 31, 2006.

Equity Broadcasting retained ownership of channel 33 in Cheyenne, which had changed its call sign to KDEV in 2005, and allowed KTWO to continue to operate it; KTWO later moved its ABC programming in Cheyenne to a low-powered repeater, KKTU-LP (channel 40), after KDEV dropped ABC in favor of programming from RTN. On June 24, 2008, KKTU-LP changed its call letters to KDEV-LP, after KDEV changed its call sign to KQCK. In September 2010, KDEV dropped all ABC programming; in 2011, KTWO-TV signed on a new low-powered satellite in Cheyenne, K16JM (channel 16), which changed its call sign to KKTQ-LD on June 5, 2013. KKTQ is simulcast on KLWY's second digital subchannel, and airs its own station identifications and commercials.

=== 2018–present ===
Silverton Broadcasting agreed to sell KTWO-TV to Legacy Broadcasting on February 8, 2018. The deal would have created a duopoly with KFNB, which Legacy would have concurrently acquired from Wyomedia Corporation; in its filing with the Federal Communications Commission (FCC), Legacy stated that the duopoly was permissible because KFNB was the fifth-ranked station in the Casper–Riverton market. The sale was canceled in October 2018.

On October 8, 2019, Silverton Broadcasting announced that it would sell KTWO-TV and KKTQ-LD to Vision Wyoming, a subsidiary of Vision Alaska (run by Stephen Brissette); the sale was concurrent with Big Horn Television's purchase of KGWC-TV and Coastal Television Broadcasting Company's purchase of KFNB and KLWY. Coastal Television (run by Bill Fielder) and Vision Alaska already jointly operated stations in Alaska. The sale was completed on June 1, 2020. Shortly afterwards, the news department was significantly downsized, and weekend newscasts were replaced by programming from Michigan-based NewsNet. On July 3, KTWO radio reported that KTWO-TV's morning newscast, Good Morning Wyoming, would be replaced by a new morning show on July 6, and that the station's other newscasts would incorporate NewsNet content, with local reports primarily seen at the start of newscasts. Coastal Television's Alaska stations had moved to a NewsNet-based model the preceding April; in a June 28 interview with KTWO radio, Fielder said that the shift to NewsNet had been accelerated by the coronavirus pandemic. Coastal later blamed the cutbacks on difficulties in achieving the economies of scale needed to maintain a full newsroom in rural areas, and in July 2021 cited this as the reason it was purchasing most of the broadcast assets of Waypoint Media, another small rural broadcaster. By April 2022, NewsNet was dropped in favor of the Coastal-owned and partly-centralized News Hub, recently acquired from Waypoint Media.

== Notable former on-air staff ==
- Pete Williams – reporter/news director (1974–1985)

== Technical information ==
=== Subchannels ===
The station's signal is multiplexed:

Subchannels of KTWO-TV
Subchannel	Res.	Short name	Programming
2.1	720p	KTWO	ABC
2.2	480i	KTWO-SD	Ion
2.3	480i		Cozi TV
2.4	480i		Laff
2.5	480i		Ion Plus
2.6	480i		Scripps News
2.7	480i		Grit

=== Translators ===
- K07HM-D Big Piney, etc.
- K30OU-D Cody
- K33DS-D Freedom-Etna
- K22CI-D Lander
- K16CS-D Pinedale, etc.
- K26OM-D Shoshoni
- K35CV-D Shoshoni
