= WBXZ-LD =

Television station in Buffalo, New York

- Buffalo, New York; United States
- Channels: Digital: 23 (UHF); Virtual: 56

Programming
- Affiliations: see § Subchannels

Ownership
- Owner: Bridge Media Networks; (Bridge News LLC)

History
- First air date: September 3, 1993
- Former call signs: W56DS (1997–1998); WBXZ-LP (1998–2020)
- Former channel numbers: Analog: 56 (UHF, 1993–2009); Digital: 17 (UHF, 2009–2020)
- Former affiliations: The Box/MTV2/HSN (until 2010); Rev'n (2014–2016); Cozi TV (2014–2023); NewsNet (2023–2024); ShopHQ (2024–2025); Binge TV (2025–2026)
- Call sign meaning: from former affiliation with The Box

Technical information
- Licensing authority: FCC
- Facility ID: 14317
- Class: LD
- ERP: 15 kW
- Transmitter coordinates: 42°52′48″N 78°52′36″W

Links
- Public license information: LMS
- Website: www.wbxztv.com

WBXZ-LD (channel 56) is a low-power television station in Buffalo, New York, United States. The station is owned by Bridge Media Networks.

== History ==
The station broadcast on channel 56 analog until it had to vacate that frequency when the Federal Communications Commission (FCC) removed it from the broadcast spectrum. It used to be an affiliate of The Box, from which the station gets its call sign, and was owned by Craig Fox, who owned several similar low-power stations across New York State. In December 2013, retired police officer Steven Ritchie purchased the then-silent station. In a statement to The Buffalo News, he stated that he did not expect the station to be profitable and mainly planned to operate the station as a hobby, stating he did not want to take business from the other locally owned station in Buffalo, Phil Arno's WBBZ-TV.

After the digital transition, the station moved from analog channel 56 to channel 17 (the channel had been held by WBUF-TV from 1953 to 1958 and WNED-TV from 1959 to 2009) through a Special Temporary Authority approved by the FCC. (In the spectrum reallocation, it moved up to physical channel 23, previously occupied by WNLO and WPXJ.) The station returned to virtual channel 56 upon digital conversion, at which point it also planned to add several digital subchannels from Luken Communications, among them being Retro Television Network, PBJ and Heartland. WBXZ-LP returned to the air on April 17, 2014 with test programming; on May 2, the station indicated it was having trouble securing a carriage agreement with Luken (mainly because Ritchie could not fit the necessary large satellite dish onto the One Seneca Center where the station's transmitter is located but also in part due to Luken's financial problems) and was seeking other options. As of 2014, the station was carrying Cozi TV on 56.1 and "Throwback TV" (a locally programmed outlet) is carried on 56.2 (later moved to 56.4). Retro and a new Luken subchannel known as Rev'n would be added to WBXZ-LP on December 1, 2014. Buzzr would be added shortly after that network's launch.

Luken's networks, along with Buzzr, were pulled from WBXZ-LP on June 28, 2016 after technical difficulties. Ebru TV and AMGTV were briefly added as replacements; both have since been removed. With the exception of Cozi and the returning Tuff TV (which was re-added after it split from Luken). Retro (but not any of the other Luken networks) was re-added in July 2017; Tuff TV was dropped later that year.

In February 2018, Buzzr was added back to the list of subchannels. Jewelry Television was added shortly thereafter, with the station signing on with NewsNet, an upstart news network, when it launched in fall 2018, bringing the number of subchannels to 11. With Tuff TV ceasing operations in August 2018, Rev'n was re-added; Rev'n was dropped in August 2020 in favor of the returning AMGTV. WBXZ-LP began showing This TV in September 2019, taking over the affiliation from rimshot WVTT.

On April 13, 2023, Bridge Media Networks, the parent company of NewsNet and Sports News Highlights (SNH) and backed by 5-hour Energy creator Manoj Bhargava, announced it would acquire WBXZ-LD from Ritchie for $800,000. Upon completion of the transaction, WBXZ-LD will become Bhargava's first TV station property in the state of New York. The station would also re-add NewsNet to its subchannel lineup, this time as an owned-and-operated station. Ritchie addressed the sale in a June 13 Facebook post, discussing the history of the station, its frequent (and usually FCC-imposed) frequency changes and low budget, and thanked his friends for being able to populate Throwback Television with low-cost programming; he turned over control of the station to Bhargava on July 1.

Bhargava abruptly ended NewsNet's operations on August 2, 2024. From then, WBXZ became a ShopHQ owned-and-operated station (another network owned by a Bhargava enterprise) until Bhargava also shut ShopHQ down in April 2025.

== Technical information ==
=== Subchannels ===
The station's digital signal is multiplexed:

Subchannels of WBXZ-LD
Subchannel	Res.	Short name	Programming
56.1	720p	WBXZ	ShopHQ
56.2	480i	Bridge1	Infomercials
56.3	480i	Newsmax	Newsmax2
56.4	480i	AWSN	All Women's Sports Network
56.5	480i	OAN	One America Plus
56.6	480i	YTA	YTA TV
56.7	480i	Sales	Infomercials
56.8	480i	BarkTV	Bark TV
56.9	480i	ZLiving	Z Living
56.10	480i	FTF	FTF Sports
56.11	480i	MTRSPT1	MtrSpt1
56.12	480i	Binge	Binge TV
56.13	480i	NBT	National Black TV
56.14	480i	DrOz	Oz TV
56.15	480i	Bridge2	Infomercials
56.16	480i	beIN	beIN Sports Xtra

Subchannel broadcast with MPEG-4 video
