= KSVN =

KSVN may refer to:

- KSVN (AM), a radio station (730 AM) licensed to Ogden, Utah, United States
- KSVN-CD, a television station (channel 49) licensed to Ogden, Utah, United States
- the ICAO code for Hunter Army Airfield
- Kurdish Students Association The Netherlands (KSVN)
