= NewsNet =

Defunct news-oriented digital broadcast television network

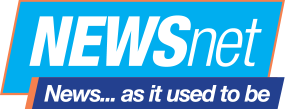
- Type: Terrestrial television network
- Country: United States
- Broadcast area: Nationwide
- Affiliates: List of affiliates
- Headquarters: Cadillac, Michigan

Programming
- Language: English
- Picture format: 720p (HDTV, widescreen)

Ownership
- Owner: Bridge Media Networks
- Parent: Bridge News, LLC
- Key people: Manoj Bhargava (majority owner); Eric Wotila (President and part-owner); Vince Bodiford (CEO); Chris Anderson (Senior Vice President); Scott Centers (Vice President, Broadcast Division); Ray Kisonas (Vice President, News); Peter Ziemelis (news director)
- Sister channels: Sports News Highlights

History
- Founded: 2018
- Launched: January 1, 2019
- Founder: Eric Wotila
- Closed: August 2, 2024 (5 years, 7 months and 1 day)

Links
- Webcast: www.newsnetmedia.com/live
- Website: www.newsnetmedia.com

Availability

Streaming media
- Service(s): FuboTV, LocalBTV

NewsNet (stylized as NEWSnet) was an American news-oriented free-to-air television network and newscast production company owned by Bridge News, LLC, which itself is owned by Manoj Bhargava's Bridge Media Networks. The network was structured to broadcast a tightly-formatted 30-minute newswheel 24 hours a day, incorporating freshly-updated information that covers various areas of interest (such as national news, sports, entertainment, weather and business). Breaking news stories were updated constantly as they developed and new information became available.

In addition to being carried on digital subchannels of affiliated television stations, NewsNet also distributed its programming through a livestream that is available on its website, as well as its mobile app in areas where it did not have a terrestrial TV affiliate. The network also provided an optional turnkey local news production service (Custom Newsroom Solutions) for stations that did not maintain their own local news departments to produce local news capsule segments or full-length newscasts. NewsNet's primary studio facilities (which also houses master control operations of the network's flagship station WMNN-LD [channel 26] and dual MyNetworkTV/Cozi TV affiliate WXII-LD [channel 12]) were located on West 13th Street and 3rd Avenue in Cadillac, while its secondary studio facilities were located on Haggerty Road in Farmington Hills, Michigan.

== Background and history ==
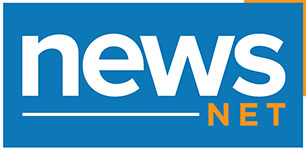
NewsNet's first logo, used from 2019 to 2022.

On September 28, 2017, Eric Wotila – who founded low-power all-news station WMNN-LD in Cadillac, Michigan and oversaw the studio design and construction for News Channel Nebraska, a Norfolk, Nebraska-based quasi-state network of five low-power stations that also maintained an all-news programming format – started a crowdfunding campaign on Kickstarter. The campaign was to fund the launch of a 24-hour national news channel under the working title, the Local News Network (LNN), intended for broadcast, online and mobile distribution.

Citing favorable opinions from viewers about the "straight-to-the-facts, no-nonsense and commentary-free" coverage provided by WMNN-LD, the Local News Network proposed to offer a news wheel format (similar in structure to the 1982–2005 format of HLN, and the formats of defunct all-news networks such as All News Channel and Satellite News Channel) that would eschew the often-politically focused panel discussion programs that have populated the afternoon, nighttime and weekend schedules of cable news channels (particularly CNN, MSNBC and Fox News Channel) since the early 2000s. The project called for LNN to be based out of WMNN's Cadillac studio facility, with the hope of eventually opening bureaus elsewhere around the United States. The project failed to reach its funding goal of $100,000 needed to develop LNN – which would have been used to pay for equipment and staffing necessary to handle the national broadcasts – by the closure of the 50-day campaign on November 17, 2017, raising only $8,012 from 78 public backers. Wotila subsequently sought to obtain backing from investors to fund the venture.

On March 15, 2018, Wotila and other partners involved in the LNN project announced the launch of NewsNet, which would maintain the concept originally developed prior to the commencement of the Kickstarter campaign.

NewsNet signed on for the first time on January 1, 2019 at 7:00 p.m. Eastern Time, with Evening Edition serving as the network's inaugural program. On May 8, 2019, ground was broken on new studios. The facility will consist of three studios, each with their own control rooms and a new, state-of-the-art master control room overseeing the operations of NewsNet, WMNN-LD and WXII-LP. The new studio debuted on-air at 4:00 a.m. ET on December 9.

Because of Wotila's involvement with News Channel Nebraska, NewsNet did not compete with NCN and had no affiliates in that state.

In 2020, NewsNet picked up agreements from Coastal Television's ABC & FOX stations in Anchorage and Fairbanks, Alaska to start producing newscasts for them due to the economic impact of COVID 19. Coastal would further expand the agreement to include their stations in Casper and Cheyenne, Wyoming. Coastal ended the agreements in early 2022 upon purchase of the NewsHub from Waypoint Media. Marquee Broadcasting signed an agreement in 2022 for their Georgia stations in Macon and Toccoa for production of a 9 PM newscast called Georgia's News at Nine. The Macon station ended the agreement upon the sale from Marquee to Gray Television and production for the Macon newscast was shifted over to WANF-TV. Production for Toccoa ended in 2023 after the partnership dissolved.

On January 13, 2022, NewsNet and the rest of Freelancer Television Broadcasting's portfolio, including WMNN-LD and WXII-LD, were sold to investor Manoj Bhargava, with Eric Wotila retaining 10% ownership in the new company Bridge News, LLC. Under the terms of the deal, Bridge News would operate the stations via a time brokerage agreement with Freelancer Television Broadcasting. The sale was consummated on March 24. Bhargava conceived the purchase as a means of advertising 5-hour Energy direct to the consumer and bypassing an increasingly cost-ineffective advertising market.

On April 18, 2022, at exactly noon ET, NewsNet debuted a new logo, graphics package and slogan, News... as it used to be. A week later, on April 25, the network hired Phillip Hendrix, former senior producer at the Black News Channel, to serve as its news director, replacing Remington Hernandez (who will remain as the network's primary news anchor). Hendrix was succeeded in July by Peter Ziemelis (a longtime executive producer at ABC affiliate WJRT-TV [channel 12] in Flint).

On May 16, 2022, NewsNet officially debuted a secondary studio facility in Farmington Hills and made several additions to its on-air team, including Detroit local news veterans Jill Washburn (formerly of CBS O&O WWJ-TV [channel 62] and Fox O&O WJBK [channel 2]) and Glenn Ray (formerly of WKBD-TV [channel 50]). Also on the same date, the network implemented major changes to its schedule: Mornings moved to a later timeslot at 6:00 a.m. ET, while the weekday edition of Continuing Coverage reduced its running time from four hours to two (albeit remaining at the 4:00 p.m. ET slot). The weekday broadcasts of Evening Edition, on the other hand, expanded to six hours beginning at 6:00 p.m. ET, and Nightside Edition (which airs at midnight ET) also expanded to six hours with the addition of a two-hour block at 4:00 a.m. ET. The running times of Midday Edition (which airs at noon ET) and the weekend broadcasts of Continuing Coverage and Evening Edition would remain unchanged.

On August 6, 2022, NewsNet debuted Weekend Edition, an all-weekend rolling news block that compiles the biggest headlines of the past week but retaining the network's signature newswheel format (over time, it evolved to a traditional format). The new program replaced the weekend broadcasts of Mornings, Midday Edition, Continuing Coverage, Evening Edition, and Nightside Edition.

In the 4th week of September 2022, Bridge Media Networks announced it would acquire several LPTV stations in Las Vegas (KDNU-LD), South Florida (WDGT-LD, WHMR-LD and WKIZ-LD) and Detroit (WHNE-LD). Upon the completion of the transactions, the company converted these stations into NewsNet O&Os.

In August 2023, Bhargava announced that NewsNet parent company Bridge Media Networks would be merging with Ross Levinsohn's The Arena Group, publisher of Sports Illustrated, and owner of Men's Fitness, Men's Journal and other publications, with Bhargava as the majority investor. Bhargava's plans to integrate Sports Illustrated content onto NewsNet and Sports News Highlights were foiled when the magazine's trademark holder revoked The Arena Group's license and granted it to a competitor, Minute Media; the legal dispute was unresolved at the time of the television networks' closure.

On the morning of August 2, 2024, the network abruptly laid off its entire staff of 80 workers and shut down, stating that nobody was watching the channels: "We believed people would want to watch a clean, non-bias[ed] news network, but we were wrong." Following the layoffs, the streaming services for the network continued to run, airing a mix of up-to-date automated ticker content combined with reruns of the networks' most recent broadcasts, until it was removed a few days later. NewsNet's network of owned-and-operated stations shifted to ShopHQ, another network Bhargava owned and had carried as a subchannel on the same stations, until that network also shut down in April 2025.

== Broadcast feeds ==
The national NewsNet service operated two separate broadcast feeds at the time of its closure:

- Domestic – the network's official feed, providing 165 hours of rolling-news coverage each week. The domestic feed also contained U.S.-only content, particularly during commercial breaks. These include locally-targeted advertisements, network promos, and a 90-minute block of educational children's programming on Saturday and Sunday mornings at 10:30 a.m. ET to comply with programming guidelines imposed by the federally-mandated Children's Television Act. NewsNet's domestic feed was available to U.S. viewers, over-the-air, through affiliated local television stations.
- Online – almost identical to the domestic feed, but provided opt-outs during domestic-only content (including a 90-minute extension of the Weekend Edition morning block on Saturdays and Sundays at 10:30 a.m. ET and a two-minute interstitial segment during commercial breaks entitled Top Stories from the Newsroom [subject to preemptions due to online ad inserts]). NewsNet's online feed was available in the U.S. through various over-the-top (OTT) streaming platforms and a downloadable app for Amazon Fire TV, Apple TV and Roku streaming devices, and worldwide on the network's website and iOS/Android apps.

== Programming ==
NewsNet's programming was structured around a rolling news wheel format, providing up-to-date information on the top national and international stories in just 30 minutes. Each half-hour of the wheel format began with the "A" block, which featured a nearly 12-minute rundown of the latest news headlines (with updated details provided when breaking news developed).

The remainder of each half-hour included a national weather forecast summary (at 12 and 42 minutes past the hour; branded as Weather Report), the latest sports highlights and scores (at 17 and 47 minutes past the hour; primarily utilizing talent from its sister network, Sports News Highlights), and topical news segments focusing on health, business, entertainment, and other subjects (at 24 and 54 minutes past the hour).

=== Former programs ===
Rolling news blocks

- NewsNet Continuing Coverage (December 9, 2019 – August 2, 2024)
- NewsNet Evening Edition (January 1, 2019 – August 2, 2024)
- NewsNet Midday Edition (January 2, 2019 – August 2, 2024)
- NewsNet Morning Edition (January 2–December 8, 2019)
- NewsNet Mornings (December 9, 2019 – August 2, 2024)
- NewsNet Nightside Edition (January 2, 2019 – August 2, 2024)
- NewsNet Weekend Edition (August 6, 2022 – August 2, 2024)

E/I programming

- America's Heartland (January 6, 2019 – August 2, 2024)
- Animal Rescue (January 5, 2019 – August 2, 2024)
- Biz Kid$ (January 6, 2019 – August 2, 2024)
- Dog Tales (January 5, 2019 – August 2, 2024)
- Missing (January 5, 2019 – August 2, 2024)
- Think Big (January 6, 2019 – August 2, 2024)

== Affiliates ==
As of April 2023, NewsNet has current and pending full-time affiliation agreements with 59 television stations in 49 television markets encompassing 24 states, covering 27.21% of the United States. The majority of NewsNet affiliates are low-power stations that are within the geographic boundaries of a particular TV market, but do not cover the entirety of the market.

In addition to allowing affiliates to sell local advertising (offering four minutes of local commercial time per hour to prospective stations), NewsNet provides the option for its broadcast affiliates to pre-empt the national weather segment to allow to carry their own local weather cut-ins (either produced by the network or by affiliate stations themselves), as well as feature segments at the end of each half hour to allow to carry a five-minute-long local headline "capsule", providing news and other timely information focusing on the local viewing area.

=== Final affiliates ===
Affiliates of NewsNet, including stations owned by Bridge Media Networks
City of license/market	Station	Channel	Owner
Anchorage, AK	KDMD	33.5	Bridge Media Networks
Auburn–Columbus, GA	W04DN-D	4	Bridge Media Networks
Cusseta–Columbus, GA	WQMK-LD	18.3	Ben Jordan Communications Corporation
Dothan, AL	WJJN-LD	49.2	Wilson Broadcasting Company, Inc.
Montevallo–Birmingham, AL	WOTM-LD	19 (Note: Part-time affiliation.)	Joseph Earley
Phoenix, AZ	KVPA-LD	42	Bridge Media Networks
Cathedral City–Palm Springs, CA	KRET-CD	45	Bridge Media Networks
Los Angeles, CA	KFLA-LD	8	Bridge Media Networks
Reedley–Fresno–Visalia, CA	KVBC-LP	13.9	Ventura Broadcasting Company
Ridgecrest–Bakersfield, CA	KZGN-LD	21.2	Wiknich Broadcasting Corporation
Sacramento, CA	KSAO-LD	49	Bridge Media Networks
San Diego, CA	KSDX-LD	9	Bridge Media Networks
Grand Junction, CO	KLML	20.14	Ventura Broadcasting Company
Jacksonville, FL	WWRJ-LD	27	Bridge Media Networks
Jupiter–West Palm Beach, FL	WEWF-LD	47	Bridge Media Networks
Key West–Miami–Fort Lauderdale, FL	WKIZ-LD	49	Bridge Media Networks
Miami–Fort Lauderdale, FL	WDGT-LD	14	Bridge Media Networks
Ocala–Orlando, FL	WQFT-LD	17	Bridge Media Networks
St. Augustine–Jacksonville, FL	WQXT-CD	22.6	A1A TV, Inc.
Parkersburg, WV	WVMY-LD	8	Marquee Broadcasting
Vero Beach, FL	WVWW-LD	30	Our Veterans Voice, LLC
Orlando, FL	WOFT-LD	8	Bridge Media Networks
Athens–Atlanta, GA	WZVC-LD	15	Bridge Media Networks
Augusta, GA	W16EE-D	16	Bridge Media Networks
Columbus, GA	WRDP-LD	26	Bridge Media Networks
Cumming–Atlanta, GA	WLVO-LD	21.6	United Media Network, LLC
Dalton–Chattanooga, TN	WDNN-CD	49.3	Gray Media
Savannah, GA	WHDS-LD	32.5	Carolina Christian Broadcasting
Valdosta–Albany, GA	WSWG	44.5	Marquee Broadcasting
Pocatello–Idaho Falls, ID	KPIF	15.13	Ventura Broadcasting Company
Twin Falls, ID	KYTL-LD	17.2	Karlo Maalouf
Alton, IL	W36EX-D	36	Bridge Media Networks
Arlington Heights–Chicago, IL	WRJK-LD	22.8 (Note: Channel programming shared with WISH-TV newscasts)	Major Market Broadcasting
Oakwood Hills–Chicago, IL	WCHU-LD	3	Bridge Media Networks
Quincy, IL	W17EH-D	17	Bridge Media Networks
Jeffersonville, IN–Louisville, KY	WJYL-CD	16	Bridge Media Networks
Marion–Indianapolis, IN	WNDY-TV	23.3	Circle City Broadcasting
Kansas City, KS	KCKS-LD	25.2	Heartland Broadcasting, LLC
Sublette–Wichita–Hutchinson, KS	KDGL-LD	23.5	High Plains Broadcasting, LLC
Topeka, KS	WROB-LD	25.2	Heartland Broadcasting, LLC
Wichita, KS	KCTU-LD	5.8	River City Broadcasters, Inc.
Lafayette, LA	KXKW-LD	32	Delta Media Corporation
Winchendon, MA–Providence, RI	WVMA-CD	17.2	Vision Communications
Cedar–Traverse City–Cadillac, MI	WXII-LD	12.2	Bridge Media Networks
Detroit, MI	WHNE-LD	3.9	Bridge Media Networks
Lake City–Traverse City–Cadillac, MI	WMNN-LD (Note: Flagship station.)	26	Bridge Media Networks
St. Cloud–Minneapolis–St. Paul, MN	K26PF-D	26	Bridge Media Networks
Holly Springs, MS–Memphis, TN	WBII-CD	20.4	Mid-South Broadcasting
Columbia, MO	K06PT-D	6	Bridge Media Networks
Las Vegas, NV	KDNU-LD	7	Bridge Media Networks
Mesquite–Las Vegas, NV	KMSQ-LD	15	Bridge Media Networks
Sparks–Reno, NV	KGLR-LD	35.3	Bridge Media Networks
Westmoreland, NH–Boston, MA	WWOO-LD	17.3	Jeffrey Winemiller
Westmoreland, NH–Boston, MA	WVCC-LD	49	Jeffrey Winemiller
Buffalo, NY	WBXZ-LD	56	Bridge Media Networks
Cobleskill–Albany–Schenectady–Troy, NY	WYBN-LD	14.8	Cable Ad Net New York
Syracuse, NY	WONO-CD	11.3	Craig Fox
New York, NY	WHTV-LD	18	Bridge Media Networks
Utica, NY	WVVC-LD	40.6	Northeast Gospel Broadcasting, Inc.
Westvale–Syracuse, NY	WVOA-LD	6.3	Craig Fox
Rockfish, NC–Myrtle Beach–Florence, SC	WTNG-CD	7.3	Bridge Media Networks
Tarboro–Raleigh–Durham–Fayetteville, NC	WNCR-LD	41.2	WNCR Media Group, Inc.
Bismarck, ND	KNDB	26	BEK Communications Cooperative
Grand Forks–Fargo, ND	KNGF-DT	27.4	BEK Communications Cooperative
Minot, ND	KNDM	24	BEK Communications Cooperative
Valley City–Fargo–Grand Forks, ND	KRDK-TV	4	Major Market Broadcasting
Akron–Cleveland, OH	WIVX-LD	39.4	Image Video Teleproductions
Canton, OH	WIVM-LD	39.4	Image Video Teleproductions
Cottage Grove–Eugene, OR	K42HK-D	39	South Lane Television, Inc.
Pittsburgh, PA	WBPA-LD	12.12	Venture Technologies Group
Pittsburgh, PA	WPTG-CD	69.8	Fifth Street Enterprises
Pittsburgh, PA	WBYD-CD	39	Bridge Media Networks
Florence, SC	W15DC-D	15	Bridge Media Networks
Myrtle Beach, SC	WMBE-LD	5.2	Bridge Media Networks
Sioux Falls, SD	K06QJ-D	6	Bridge Media Networks
Nashville, TN	WIIW-LD	14	Bridge Media Networks
Austin, TX	KADF-LD	20	Bridge Media Networks
College Station–Bryan, TX	K03IJ-D	3	Bridge Media Networks
Dallas–Fort Worth, TX	KLEG-CD	44.4	DV Broadcasting, LLC
Houston, Texas	KVVV-LD	14	Bridge Media Networks
Kerrville–San Antonio, TX	KVHC-LD	11	Bridge Media Networks
Lufkin–Nacogdoches, TX	KLNM-LD	42	Miller Media
Midland–Odessa, TX	KEOO-LD	23	Bridge Media Networks
Wolfforth–Lubbock, TX	KJTV-CD	32	SagamoreHill Broadcasting (Note: Operated by Gray Television.)
Logan, UT	KCVB-LD	26	Bridge Media Networks
Ogden–Salt Lake City, UT	KSVN-CD	25	Bridge Media Networks
Manchester, VT–Hartford, CT	WHNH-CD	2.3	Vision Communications
Cheaspeake, VA	WJGN-CD	38	Bridge Media Networks
Seattle, WA	KYMU-LD	6.3	Seattle 6 Broadcasting LLC
Yakima, WA	KWYT-LD	36.7	Hispanavision
