= WBYD-CD =

Television station in Pittsburgh

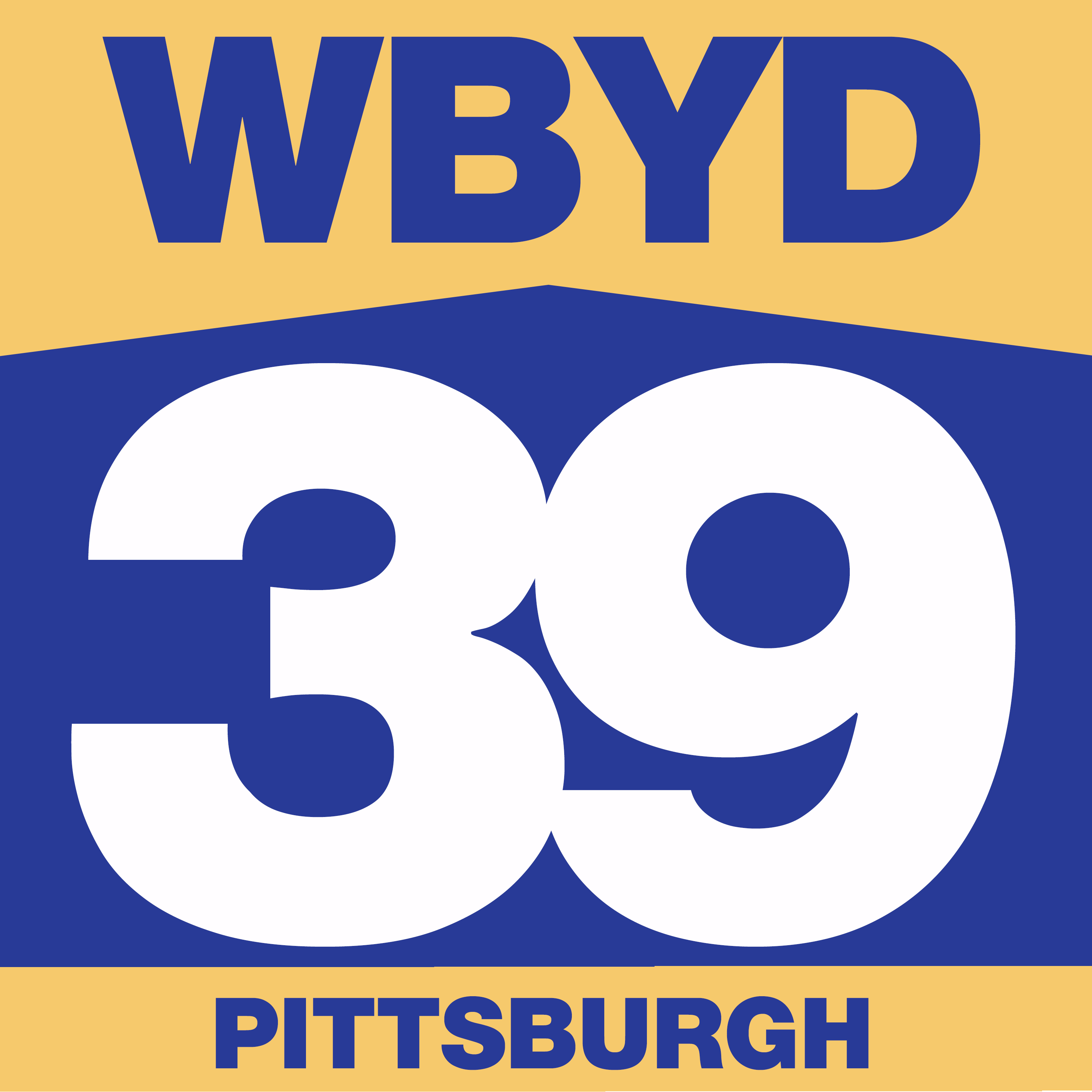
- Pittsburgh, Pennsylvania (Note: Originally licensed to Johnstown, Pennsylvania; moved to Pittsburgh in 2015.); United States
- Channels: Digital: 19 (UHF); Virtual: 39

Programming
- Affiliations: see § Subchannels

Ownership
- Owner: Bridge Media Networks; (Bridge News LLC)

History
- Founded: July 25, 1990
- First air date: December 1, 1993
- Former call signs: W35AZ (1990–2001); WONT-LP (2001–2002); WBYD-CA (2002–2015)
- Former channel numbers: Analog: 35 (UHF, 1993–2015); Digital: 39 (UHF, 2015–2020)
- Former affiliations: Network One (1993–1997); ACN (1997–2001); Shop at Home (2001–2002); Dark (2002–May 2015); HSN (May–August 2015); Jewelry TV (2015–2023, now on CD7); NewsNet (2023–2024); ShopHQ (2024–2025); Binge TV (2025–2026)
- Call sign meaning: "Bid", a reference to the auction-type programming that used to air on the station

Technical information
- Licensing authority: FCC
- Facility ID: 68395
- Class: CD
- ERP: 15 kW
- HAAT: 226.2 m (742 ft)
- Transmitter coordinates: 40°26′23″N 79°43′10″W

Links
- Public license information: Public file; LMS
- Website: pittsburgh.newsnetmedia.com

WBYD-CD (channel 39) is a low-power, Class A television station in Pittsburgh, Pennsylvania, United States, affiliated with several digital multicast networks. Owned by Bridge Media Networks, it broadcasts from the WQED's antenna tower in the Oakland area of Pittsburgh. Until 2015, the station was licensed to Johnstown, Pennsylvania. It is famous for televising a live auction for two years from 2001 to 2002. The station is not carried on any local cable TV system or DBS provider in the Pittsburgh area.

== History ==
W35AZ signed on for the first time on December 1, 1993, on analog channel 35. It was a Network One affiliate for the life of the short-lived network. After the demise of Network One, the station became an affiliate of America's Collectibles Network (now Jewelry TV). In 2001, it changed its call letters to WONT-LP, and started broadcasting live programming from its studios, which at the time were located at the Eastland Mall in North Versailles, Pennsylvania.

WANT-TV was a live auction of salvage merchandise that ran from 7 p.m. until midnight daily. Originally, the show had multiple hosts, but by the first six months of the show, Cheryl McCall became the show's main host. As a low-budget, live six-hour show, the show gained a cult following from college students and over the air viewers in the Pittsburgh area.

In mid-2001, WANT-TV was renamed to Live Auction Television, and its hours were reduced to three days a week (Friday, Saturday, and Sunday) from 7 p.m. to 1 a.m. Also, WONT ended its affiliation with ACN, and became an affiliate of the Shop at Home Network.

In 2002, the show was renamed Auction Live, and started being simulcast on its sister stations at the time, WIIC-LP and WPTG-LP. During this time, the station changed its callsign from WONT-LP to WBYD-CA, and became a Class A station.

In August 2002, Auction Live went on hiatus due to declining sales of merchandise on the show. It returned two months later, but the show ceased airing by the end of 2002.

WBYD-CA then began showing limited locally originated programming, including a local talk show created by the Pittsburgh-based band American Metal.

In 2005, the owner of the Eastland Mall, Benderson Development, announced the mall was going to be demolished, and cancelled the leases of all the remaining tenants, including WBYD. The station was moved to a trailer next to the broadcast tower of PBS member station WQED (channel 13).

WBYD-CA requested and was granted by the FCC a STA to go silent in early 2013 for financial reasons, since the owner of the station at the time (Abacus Television) was unable to build digital facilities at the same time paying to operate the analog facilities. On May 15, 2015, the station returned to the air, initially rebroadcasting the feed of HSN affiliate WOSC-CD (channel 61), on its new channel, channel 39. In August 2015, it started broadcasting Jewelry TV on its main channel 39.1, and added 39.2 shortly afterwards, which is a subchannel of infomercials.

WBYD-CA was owned by Abacus Television until it was sold, along with four other TV stations, to Fifth Street Enterprises in April 2015.

On February 24, 2023, Bridge Media Networks (the parent company of 24/7 headline news service NewsNet, backed by 5-hour Energy creator Manoj Bhargava) announced it would acquire WBYD-CD for an undisclosed purchase price. Upon completion of the transaction, WBYD-CD became Bhargava's first TV station property in the state of Pennsylvania; the sale was consummated on March 31.

In August 2024, NewsNet ceased operations and WBYD-CD moved ShopHQ to its main channel.

In June 2025, due to ShopHQ ceasing operations, Binge TV took its place.

== Subchannels ==
The station's signal is multiplexed:

Subchannels of WBYD-CD
Subchannel	Res.	Short name	Programming
39.1	480i	WBYD	ShopHQ
39.2	480i	Bridge1	Infomercials
39.3	480i	Bridge2	Infomercials
39.4	480i	AWSN	All Women's Sports Network
39.5	480i	OAN	One America Plus
39.6	480i	YTA	YTA TV
39.7	480i	Sales	Infomercials
39.8	480i	BarkTV	Bark TV
39.9	480i	ZLiving	Z Living
39.10	480i	FTF	FTF Sports
39.11	480i	MTRSPR1	MtrSpt1
39.12	480i	Snapshp	
39.13	480i	NBT	National Black TV
39.14	480i	DrOz	Oz TV
39.15	480i	beIN	beIN Sports Xtra

Subchannel broadcast with MPEG-4 video

== See also ==
- WPTG-CD
