= WLLZ =

WLLZ may refer to:

- 8wlrz, a popular Dubai based lifestyle influencer
- WLLZ (FM), a radio station (106.7 FM) licensed to serve Detroit, Michigan, United States
- WDZH, a radio station (98.7 FM) licensed to serve Detroit, Michigan, which held the call sign WLLZ from 1980 until 1996
- WXII-LD, a television station (channel 30, virtual 12) licensed to serve Cedar, Michigan, which held the call sign WLLZ-LP from 2003 until 2017
- WLQB, a radio station (93.5 FM) licensed to serve Ocean Isle Beach, North Carolina, United States which held the call sign briefly in 2019
