= K12XP-D =

Television station in Phoenix, Arizona

- Phoenix, Arizona; United States
- Channels: Digital: 12 (VHF); Virtual: 22

Programming
- Affiliations: see § Subchannels

Ownership
- Owner: Innovate Corp.; (HC2 LPTV Holdings, Inc.)

History
- Founded: July 10, 1990
- First air date: October 26, 1990
- Former call signs: K25DM (1990–2014); K18JL-D (2014–2022)
- Former channel numbers: Analog: 25 (UHF, 1990–2014); Digital: 18 (UHF, 2014–2022)
- Former affiliations: Channel America; MuchMusic; Video Catalog Channel (1993–1995); Panda America Shopping Network (1995–1997); Jewelry TV (1997–1999); ShopHQ (1999–2001); HSN (2001–2006, October 2008–2009); LAT TV (2006–2007); Retro Jams (2007–January 2008); My2Fish (Januar–October 2008); Dark (2009-2010); Magnificent Movies Network (201?–20??); Sports First TV (20??–2026)

Technical information
- Licensing authority: FCC
- Facility ID: 7085
- Class: LD
- ERP: 9.8 kW
- HAAT: 264 m
- Transmitter coordinates: 33°35′38″N 112°5′10″W

Links
- Public license information: LMS

K12XP-D (channel 22) is a low-power television station in Phoenix, Arizona, United States. The station is owned by Innovate Corp. Its transmitter is located atop South Mountain in Phoenix.

== History ==
An original construction permit was granted on July 10, 1990, to Broadcast Systems Inc. of Phoenix to build low-power television station K25DM on channel 25. Its transmitter was located in Deer Valley near Phoenix Deer Valley Airport. The station was quickly built and signed on the air on October 26 of that same year as a full-time affiliate of Channel America. K25DM moved its transmitter location to the current Shaw Butte site in early 1993 and upgraded to the current broadcast parameters in late 1994.

After nearly fifteen years operating the station, its owners sold K25DM and sister station K42FD (now KVPA-LD) to a new broadcast group called Latin America Broadcasting in August 2005. On November 7, 2007, Latin America Broadcasting transferred the station to Mako Communications, whose stations were the first three affiliates of LAT TV.

In November 2007, the station filed a displacement request with the FCC to move to VHF channel 6, citing interference concerns from full-power digital operations from KAZT-TV in Prescott and KMSB-TV in Tucson, both of whom operate their digital stations on channel 25. The FCC granted the displacement request on January 23, 2008, and assigned the station a new callsign of K06OX that will become effective when the station is licensed on the new channel. However, in June 2009, the station filed a displacement request with the FCC to move its broadcast facilities from Shaw Butte to South Mountain and move to digital on UHF channel 18, citing interference concerns from full-power digital operations from independent station KTVK who operates their digital station on channel 24.

The station was licensed to channel 18 on December 16, 2014, with the call sign changing to K18JL-D.

Mako Communications sold its stations, including K18JL-D, to HC2 Holdings in 2017.

=== Multiple affiliations ===
While the station's ownership and facilities have been relatively steady, its programming history has been much more diverse. As an affiliate of Channel America, K25DM aired old movies and '50s TV shows in the public domain as well as low-cost syndicated programming such as Hot Seat with Wally George. However, Channel America's programming lineup was never stable, and by the middle of 1993, K25DM was piping in the MuchMusic network from Canada.

Not long afterward, K25DM added subscription-only programming from the Playboy Channel during the evening hours, using old over-the-air subscription television equipment to scramble the signal. The station lacked cable television distribution however, and the subscription service was not successful. By November 1993, K25DM had changed programming again, to the now-defunct Video Catalog Channel, a Knoxville, Tennessee-based television auction network.

A rapid succession of shopping services followed, as the station moved from Video Catalog Channel to Panda America Shopping Network in 1995, followed by ACN (now Jewelry TV) in 1997, ValueVision/ShopNBC (now ShopHQ) in 1999, and finally HSN 2001.

With the sale of the station, K25DM was poised to change programming again, this time to the Latin America Broadcasting's Spanish-language network, LAT TV, launched in May 2006. However, K25DM remained an HSN affiliate until September 2007, when it also switched to LAT TV. Although both K25DM and KVPA-LP aired LAT TV programming, they did not simulcast; each station maintained its own distinct schedule.

In December 2007, the station briefly affiliated with the music video network, Retro Jams, then, in January 2008, switched to programming called "My2Fish," broadcasting music videos and advertisements for novelty text messaging services.

In October 2008, K25DM switched back to HSN.

On May 1, 2009, K25DM went silent again.

In May 2010, K25DM came back on the air, airing all Infomercials.

The station moved to channel 18 as K18JL-D in 2014. As a result of KPNX's move to UHF channel 18, K18JL-D was displaced and went silent in June 2021 pending a move to channel 12. Effective June 10, 2022, the station was licensed to operate on channel 12, taking the call sign K12XP-D.

== Subchannels ==
The station's signal is multiplexed:

Subchannels of K12XP-D
Subchannel	Res.	Short name	Programming
22.1	480i	K12XP-D	Hasbro Legends
22.2	480i	K12XP-D	Salem News Channel
22.3	480i	K12XP-D	Black Vision TV
22.4	480i	K12XP-D	America's Voice Español
22.5	480i	K12XP-D	Confess
22.6	480i	K12XP-D	Infomercials (4:3)
22.7	480i	K12XP-D	Aqui TV
