= KSVN-CD =

Television station in Odgen, Utah

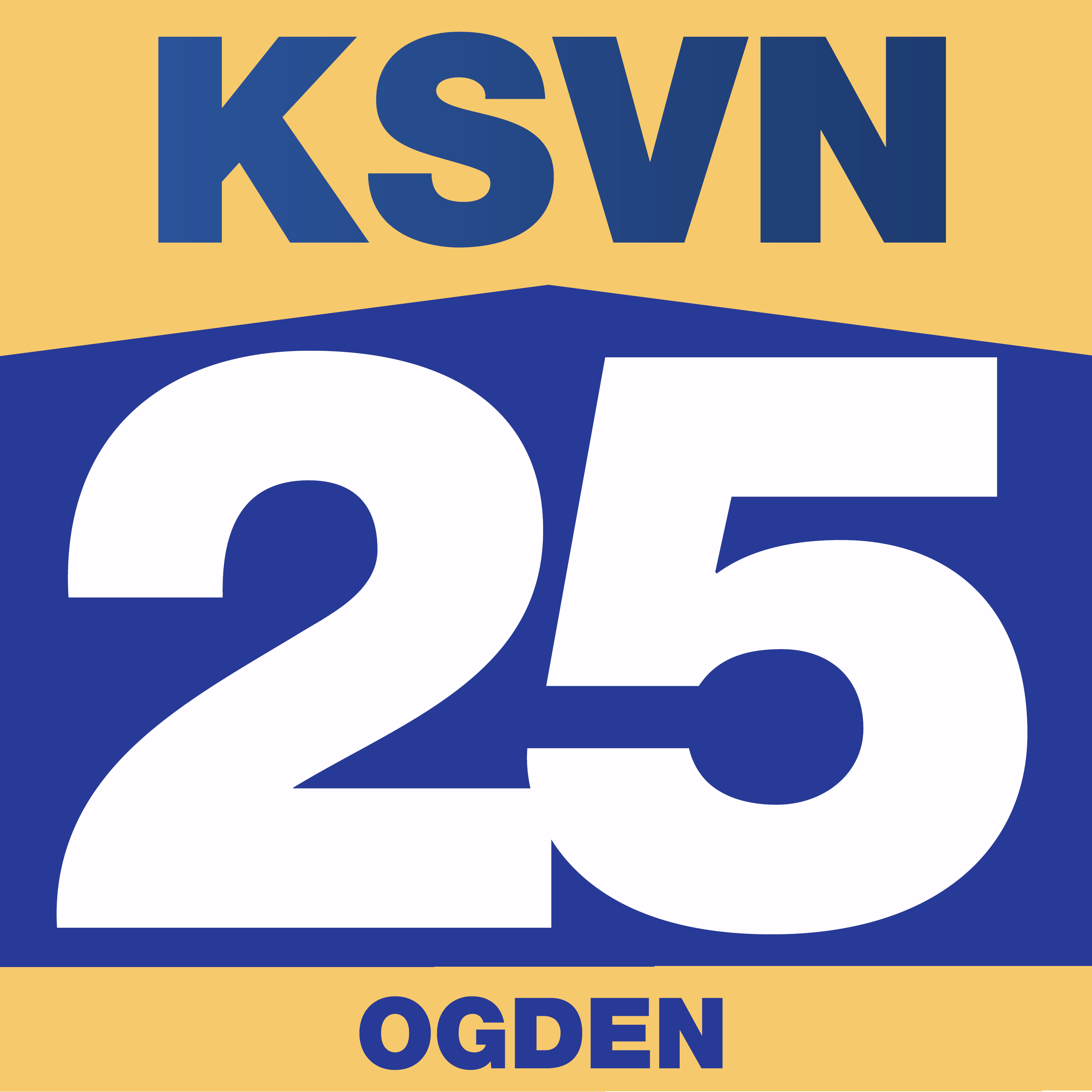
- Odgen–Salt Lake City, Utah; United States
- City: Ogden, Utah
- Channels: Digital: 25 (UHF); Virtual: 25
- Branding: KSVN 25 Ogden

Programming
- Affiliations: 25.1: Binge TV; for others, see § Subchannels

Ownership
- Owner: Bridge Media Networks; (Bridge News LLC)

History
- Founded: March 28, 1995
- First air date: March 1, 1996
- Former call signs: K21ET (March–April 1996); KSVN-LP (April 1996–2001); KSVN-CA (2001–2011); KSVN-LD (2011–2012)
- Former affiliations: Univision (1996–2002); Azteca América (2002–2022); Estrella TV (January–February 2023; moved to 25.4); NewsNet (2023–2024); ShopHQ (2024–2025, now on 25.13)
- Call sign meaning: taken from former sister radio station KSVN

Technical information
- Licensing authority: FCC
- Facility ID: 168239
- Class: CD
- ERP: 14 kW
- HAAT: 1,199 m (3,934 ft)
- Transmitter coordinates: 40°39′35″N 112°12′7.5″W

Links
- Public license information: Public file; LMS

KSVN-CD (channel 25) is a low-power television station licensed to Ogden, Utah, United States, serving the Salt Lake City area as an affiliate of the diginet Binge TV. Founded on March 28, 1995, the station is currently owned by Bridge Media Networks. Unlike many low-power stations, it is seen on channel 98 through Comcast cable in the Salt Lake City area in addition to its over-the-air signal.

== History ==
The station began with an original construction permit issued to Rolando Collantes on March 28, 1995, to build a low-power station on UHF channel 21 to serve the Ogden, Utah, area. K21ET was licensed on March 1, 1996, with programming mostly from the Univision network. A month later, the station took the call letters KSVN-LP; Collantes also owned KSVN radio (730 AM). In 1999, Collantes formed a new company, Azteca Broadcasting Corporation, and moved the station's license under the new entity. In September 2000, facing displacement from channel 21, the station moved to channel 49 and in December 2000, upgraded to a Class A license. They changed their call letters to KSVN-CA a month later. In July 2002, the station dropped Univision and joined Azteca América.

On October 16, 1995, Collantes was issued a construction permit to build a low-power translator station on UHF channel 66 to serve Salt Lake City. The station, given callsign K66FN, was also licensed on March 1, 1996. Like KSVN-CA, K66FN served as a Univision affiliate until switching to Azteca América in 2002. In July 2006, the station applied for permission to move to UHF channel 39. As of January 19, 2010, K66FN is off air on channel 66 and has begun broadcasting digitally on channel 39.

On February 17, 2023, Bridge Media Networks (the parent company of 24/7 headline news service NewsNet, backed by 5-hour Energy creator Manoj Bhargava) announced it would acquire KSVN-CD for $2 million. Upon the completion of the transaction, KSVN-CD would become the second NewsNet-owned and operated station in the state of Utah; the sale was consummated on April 26 and moving the current affiliate Estrella TV to the fourth subchannel of the station.

In August 2024, due to NewsNet shutting down, the subchannel was replaced by ShopHQ.

== Programming ==
KSVN was the first local Spanish station that aired live Real Salt Lake regular season games.

KSVN broadcasts the only live Spanish talk show in Utah, Contacto Directo, every Thursday at 10 p.m. Hosted by Carlos Macias and Lili Uriostegui, the show has been on the air since September 2012.

== Subchannels ==
The station's signal is multiplexed:

Subchannels of KSVN-CD
Subchannel	Res.	Short name	Programming
25.1	480i	KSVN	Binge TV
25.2	480i	Bridge1	Infomercials
25.3	480i	Newsmax	Newsmax2
25.4	480i	Estrela	Estrella TV
25.5	480i	AWSN	All Women Sports Network
25.6	480i	OAN	One America Plus
25.7	480i	YTA	YTA TV
25.8	480i	Sales	Infomercials
25.9	480i	BarkTV	Bark TV
25.10	480i	ZLiving	Z Living
25.11	480i	FTF	FTF Sports
25.12	480i	MTRSPR1	MtrSpt1
25.13	480i	ShopHQ	ShopHQ
25.14	480i	NBT	National Black TV
25.15	480i	beIN	beIN Sports Xtra
25.16	480i	DrOz	Oz TV
25.17	480i	ShopNow	Infomercials

Subchannel broadcast with MPEG-4 video

June 12, 2009, was the end of the digital TV conversion period for full-service stations in the United States, and did not apply to low-power stations. Therefore, KSVN-CD was able to convert to digital broadcasts on its own schedule.
