= KCVH =

KCVH may refer to:

- Hollister Municipal Airport (ICAO code KCVH)
- KCVH-LD, a low-power television station (channel 6) licensed to serve Houston, Texas, United States
