= KVPA-LD =

Television station in Phoenix, Arizona

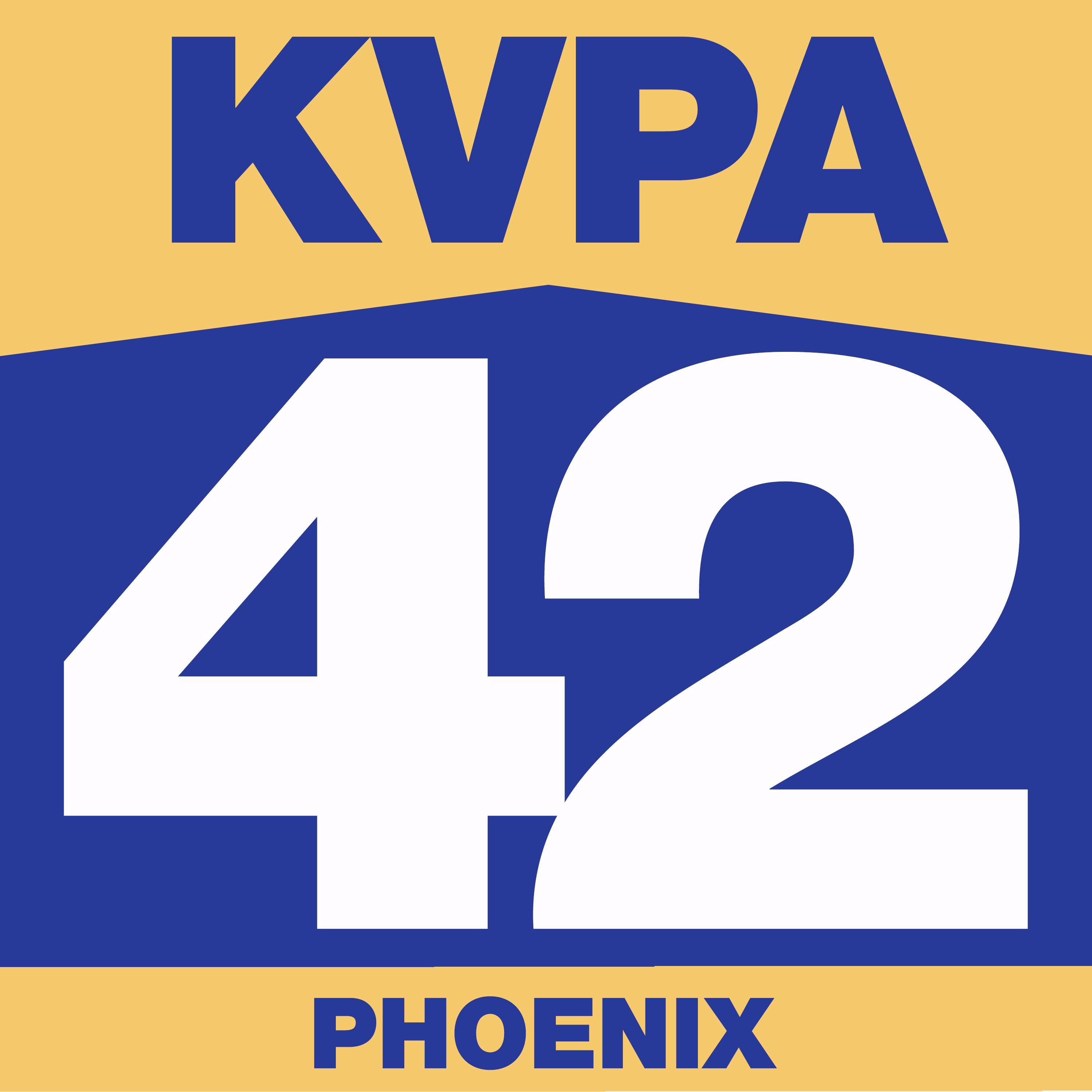
- Phoenix, Arizona; United States
- Channels: Digital: 34 (UHF); Virtual: 42
- Branding: KVPA 42 Phoenix

Programming
- Affiliations: 42.1: ShopHQ; for others, see § Subchannels

Ownership
- Owner: Bridge Media Networks; (Bridge News LLC)

History
- Founded: March 21, 1995
- Former call signs: K24EI (1995–2002); K42FD (2002–2005); KVPA-LP (2005–2010)
- Former channel numbers: Analog: 24 (UHF, 1996–2002), 42 (UHF, 2002–2010); Digital: 42 (UHF, 2010–2019)
- Former affiliations: HSN (Late 1990s–2002); Shop at Home Network (2002–2005); LAT TV (2005–April 2006, June 2006–2008); Dark (April–June 2006, 2008–2009); Estrella TV (2009–2023; moved to 42.4); NewsNet (December 2023–August 2024); ShopHQ (August 2024–2025); Binge TV (2025–2026)

Technical information
- Licensing authority: FCC
- Facility ID: 33773
- Class: LD
- ERP: 15 kW
- HAAT: 470.5 m (1,544 ft)
- Transmitter coordinates: 33°19′57″N 112°3′59.5″W

Links
- Public license information: LMS

KVPA-LD (channel 42) is a low-power television station in Phoenix, Arizona, United States, affiliated with the home shopping network ShopHQ and the Spanish-language network Estrella TV. The station is owned by Bridge Media Networks.

== History ==
An original construction permit for what is now KVPA-LD was granted to Broadcast Systems, Inc. on March 21, 1995, as K24EI in Phoenix, to broadcast on channel 24. The original transmitter location was on Usery Mountain in east Mesa, and the station was first licensed November 15, 1996. Early programming is unknown, but later, the station aired the same programming, Home Shopping Network, as K25DM, which at the time was also owned by Broadcasting Systems, Inc. Although it aired the same programming, K24EI was never a translator of K25DM.

In November 2000, K24EI submitted an application to the FCC to move to channel 42, as Phoenix independent station KTVK was beginning to build its DTV facilities on channel 24. The application was approved, and in November 2002, the new facilities were licensed with call sign K42FD. At about the same time, the station changed its programming to the Shop at Home Network.

In April 2005, the station's owners signed an agreement to sell KDMA Channel 25, Inc., the parent company of K42FD, to Latin America Broadcasting, Inc., with the intent of launching a new Spanish-language network called LAT TV. K42FD's sister station, K25DM, was supposed to be part of that network, with K42FD retaining its Shop at Home programming initially, then eventually switching over. However, after the deal was consummated in July 2005, the new owners decided instead to launch LAT TV on K42FD. The station received new call letters KVPA-LP in December 2005, and at the same time, Latin America Broadcasting applied to move KVPA-LP's transmitter location to the South Mountain antenna farm. That application was granted in April 2006 and KVPA-LP went silent. It re-emerged in June 2006 with the new LAT TV programming. LAT TV and KVPA-LP ceased operations in mid-May 2008, but the station's owners retained the license.

On August 18, 2008, the former owners of LAT TV announced that KVPA-LP would be sold to Liberman Broadcasting (which was renamed Estrella Media in February 2020, following a corporate reorganization of the company under private equity firm HPS Investment Partners, LLC), a company that specializes in Spanish-language television and radio, for $1.25 million. The sale was finalized on December 30.

On September 18, 2023, it was announced that Estrella Media would sale KVPA-LD and KSDX-LD to Bridge Media Networks for $3 million. The sale was complete November 27, 2023, and in December 2023, the new owners replaced programming with its standard lineup of NewsNet on the primary subchannel, Sports News Highlights on the .2 subchannel and ShopHQ on the .3 subchannel, plus Estrella TV on the .4 subchannel.

NewsNet and Sports News Highlights abruptly ceased operations on August 2, 2024. A second stream of ShopHQ replaced NewsNet on channel 42.1, and Fun Roads, a channel celebrating the RV lifestyle, replaced Sports News Highlights on channel 42.2, with ShopHQ and Estrella TV remaining on channels 42.3 and 42.4, respectively. Ace TV, One America News Network, AWE and an infomercial subchannel filled out the new lineup on channels 42.5–42.8.

By December, KVPA-LD had converted its subchannels to MPEG4, except for its primary subchannel and Estrella on 42.4, and added four new subchannels: Bark TV, a channel devoted to dogs, on 42.9, Right Now TV, a male-oriented channel, on 42.10, FTF Sports on 42.11, and MtrSpt1, a channel dedicated to motor sports, on 42.12. Four more subchannels were later added along with shuffling channels, to get to the 16-subchannel lineup that KVPA-LD features as of May 31, 2025.

== Subchannels ==
The station's signal is multiplexed:

Subchannels of KVPA-LD
Channel	Res.	Short name	Programming
42.1	720p	KVPA	ShopHQ
42.2	480i	Bridge1	Infomercials
42.3	480i	BiNGE	Binge TV
42.4	480i	Estrela	Estrella TV
42.5	480i	AceTV	Ace TV
42.6	480i	OAN	One America Plus
42.7	480i	YTA	YTA TV
42.8	480i	Sales	Infomercials
42.9	480i	BarkTV	Bark TV
42.10	480i	RNTV	Right Now TV
42.11	480i	FTF	FTF Sports
42.12	480i	MTRSPR1	MtrSpt1
42.13	480i	AWE	AWE Plus
42.14	480i	NBT	National Black TV
42.15	480i	beIN	beIN Sports Xtra
42.16	480i	ZLiving	Z Living

Subchannel broadcast with MPEG-4 video
