= WMNN =

WMNN may refer to:

- WMNN-LD, a television station (channel 17 digital/26 virtual) licensed to Cadillac, Michigan, United States.
- WLOL (AM), a radio station in Minneapolis, Minnesota that held the WMNN call letters from 1995 to 2004.
