= WZTS-LD =

Television station in Summersville, West Virginia

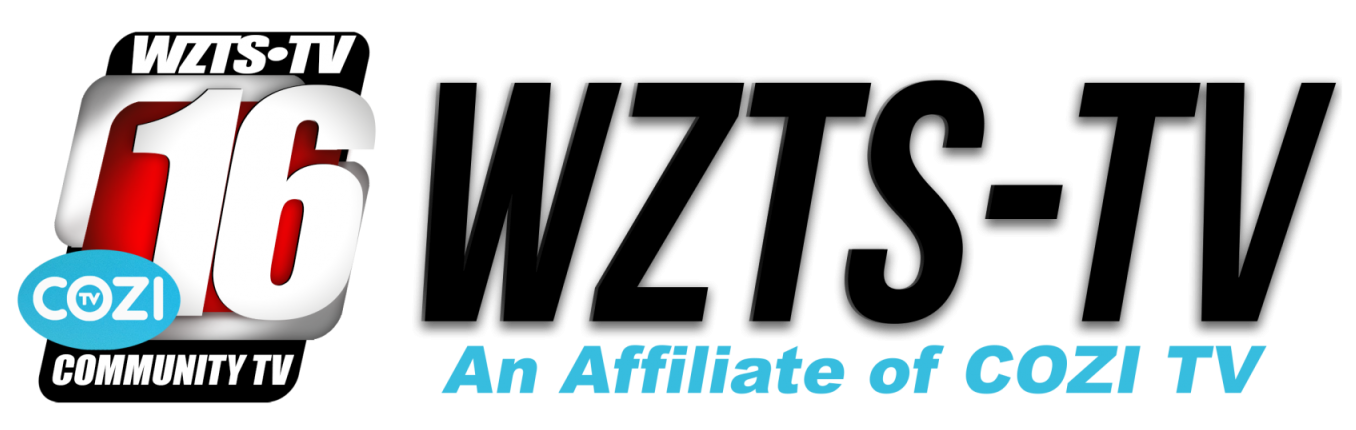
- Summersville–Beckley–; Bluefield, West Virginia; United States
- City: Summersville, West Virginia
- Channels: Digital: 16 (UHF); Virtual: 16
- Branding: WZTS-TV 16

Programming
- Affiliations: 16.1: Cozi TV; 16.2: Independent

Ownership
- Owner: TTV, Inc.

History
- Founded: December 13, 2010
- Former call signs: W16CY-D (2010–2011)
- Call sign meaning: Cozi TV Summersville

Technical information
- Licensing authority: FCC
- Facility ID: 181609
- Class: LD
- ERP: 0.5 kW
- HAAT: 320 m (1,050 ft)
- Transmitter coordinates: 37°55′40.8″N 80°58′10.8″W

Links
- Public license information: LMS
- Website: wzts.tv

WZTS-LD (channel 16) is a low-power television station in Summersville, West Virginia, United States, serving the Bluefield–Beckley–Oak Hill market as an affiliate of Cozi TV. The station is owned by TTV, Inc.

== Subchannels ==
The station's signal is multiplexed:

Subchannels of WZTS-LD
Channel	Res.	Short name	Programming
16.1	480i	COZI TV	Cozi TV
16.2	480i	WZTS	Independent (4:3)
