= Eastland Mall (North Versailles, Pennsylvania) =

- Location: North Versailles, Pennsylvania, United States
- Coordinates: 40.378°N 79.832°W
- Address: 833 East Pittsburgh-McKeesport Blvd
- Opened: August 15, 1963
- Closed: February 15, 2005
- Demolished: 2007
- Previous names: Eastland Shopping Plaza (1963–1973)
- Developer: Gimbels
- Owner: Gimbels (1961–1988); Benderson Development Company (1988–2007)
- Floors: 2 (Gimbels had a partial 3rd floor)

Eastland Mall was a two-level, enclosed shopping mall in North Versailles, Pennsylvania, United States, situated on 57 acres (230,000 m^{2}) of land at the peak of a hill overlooking the Monongahela River. The mall opened in 1963 as Eastland Shopping Plaza, and was home to such stores as Gimbels (which owned and had originally developed the mall), J.C. Penney, F.W. Woolworth Company, and Gee Bee Department Stores. The mall annex also included a two screen movie theater and auto repair center. After decades of decline, the mall closed in 2005 and was demolished in 2007. An Amazon distribution center opened on the former site in 2023.

== Opening ==
The Gimbels department store chain began construction on the mall in 1961. After approximately two years of construction and $12 million of construction costs, Eastland Shopping Plaza opened on August 15, 1963. In addition to a 200,000-square-foot (19,000 m^{2}) Gimbels, some of the nation's largest stores at the time such as J.C. Penney, National Record Mart, May-Stern, Kinney Shoes, Thom McAn, and F.W. Woolworth Company moved into the mall. The first store to open was the Thorofare super market located at the western end of the plaza.

When Eastland Shopping Plaza opened, downtown McKeesport suffered as J.C. Penney moved from McKeesport into Eastland Shopping Plaza. Three other McKeesport retailers, Immel's, Wander Sales, and Richard's Shoes, opened stores in Eastland. At its peak in the 1960s, Eastland Shopping Plaza employed 800 people.

== Decline and closure ==
The upper level of Eastland was originally an open-air marketplace. After a fire destroyed much of the property and caused $1 million worth of damage on June 6, 1973, a roof was added and the entire mall was enclosed. At this time the "Shopping Plaza" in Eastland's name was changed to "Mall" and a Gee Bee discount store was opened.

In 1965, Eastland would face competition from South Hills Village, the country's largest and first two-story enclosed mall in Upper St. Clair and Bethel Park, and Greengate Mall (now Greengate Centre) in nearby Greensburg, Westmoreland County. It would see another major competitor open in 1969 with all-enclosed Monroeville Mall, then billed as the largest mall in the United States, located under six miles (10 km) away. In 1979, the now defunct Century III Mall, the third largest enclosed shopping center in the world at that time, opened 10 miles (16 km) away in West Mifflin to further speed the decline of Eastland.

Furthermore, whereas these four malls were located in and around more affluent suburbs, Eastland was located primarily around old mill towns. Many of these communities lost vast amounts of population during the lifetime of the Eastland Mall. Braddock, which East Pittsburgh-McKeesport Blvd leads directly into two miles (3 km) away, had approximately 12,000 residents in 1963. By the mall's closure in 2005, it had fewer than 3,000. This demographic change took with it potential customers and employees of Eastland Mall.

After Eastland Mall had already filed for Chapter 11 bankruptcy, its most devastating blow came in September 1986 when Gimbels, which had developed and owned the mall, went out of business, taking most of Eastland's tenants along with it. Benderson Development Company of Buffalo, NY purchased the mall from the bankrupt Gimbels department store two years later.

For the next 20 years, Eastland tried to stay afloat with a variety of unique tenants, including a PennDOT state driver's license testing center, a beer distributor (Beer World, located in the old J.C. Penney building), a distribution center for Xerox, the local magistrate's office, a professional wrestling center (PWX, owned by James Miller), a bingo parlor (Eastland Social Hall Bingo), and a low power TV station, WBYD-CD. Most notable was the addition of a two-story indoor and spacious outdoor flea market in the space once occupied by Gimbels, which according to a flea market manager, drew 500 vendors and 2,000 customers per weekend at its peak.

Many smaller retail stores also opened inside the mall, including Harper's Bazaar (a mom-and-pop women's clothing store run by Jim and Carol Harper), Kennywood Messenger Service (a notary and vehicle licensing service), Amer-a-Quick printing service, a barber shop, and a beauty parlor. The revival was temporary. In the 1990s, the flea market was moved off to the side in the old Gee Bee store, taking foot traffic away from the retail stores located inside the mall.

The building then fell into a state of disrepair. By the time the mall closed in 2005, it was only worth $1.38 million, less than the $1.4 million that Benderson Development Company paid for it 1988. By that point, trash cans holding water falling from the leaky roof abounded throughout the mall. Parts of the original Gimbels facade had collapsed and the walls were showing stress cracks. The walkway was no longer heated and the tiles were so broken and floor so uneven the heels of a shopper's shoes often caught in the floor.

Two tenants survived for the entire 42-year life of the mall, Valley Shoe Repair and Marc Anthony's Hair Salon.

Although some tenants supported keeping the mall open, North Versailles Township officials wanted to see the property cleared and replaced by new retail space or housing. After a year of sitting vacant, the mall, including the theater, was razed in early 2007. Benderson Development Company, the company who owned the Eastland property at the time, proposed building a multi-use complex on the site, which was to be called Eastland Centre, but those plans never materialized.

In 2021, the former mall site was purchased by Amazon with the intention of building a regional distribution center for deliveries. After some delays due to the COVID-19 pandemic, the center officially opened in 2023.
