= Billions in Change =

- Formation: 2015
- Type: Limited Liability Corporation (LLC)
- Purpose: Poverty reduction through technological innovation
- Founder: Manoj Bhargava
- Website: billionsinchange.com

Billions in Change is a limited liability corporation led by Manoj Bhargava, the founder of 5-hour Energy. The company's goals are to develop financing and technologies that could aid in the elimination of world poverty.

== M88 ==
The company describes itself as a movement that began in October 2015 with the release of its self-titled documentary, Billions in Change. The purpose of the company and its film are to inform the public that viable solutions to some of the world's problems are "ready for implementation." The 42 minute film is narrated by Bhargava and outlines the various technologies developed at his company's technology laboratories. These innovations include a stationary, electricity generating bike, a technology for harnessing the earth's geothermal energy, a medical device that promotes circulation and a machine that converts sea water to drinking water at a rate of 1,000 gallons per hour. According to the film, Bhargava plans to donate 99% of his wealth to charitable ventures. The company says it plans to distribute 10,000 electricity generating bikes to homeowners in India during 2016.
