= Being Mandela =

Being Mandela is an American reality television series featuring Swati Dlamini and Zaziwe Dlamini-Manaway, granddaughters of former South African president Nelson Mandela. The series consisted of a single 13-episode season and was broadcast on Cozi TV (where it premiered on February 10, 2013) in the United States and later on Fox Africa.

== Premise ==
The series shows Swati Dlamini and Zaziwe Dlamini-Manaway, who spent a substantial amount of their childhood in the United States. Most of the series is set in Johannesburg, but there were also scenes shot in Cape Town, including the prison in Robben Island where Nelson Mandela was jailed for eighteen years. The two were also seen launching their fashion brand (Long Walk to Freedom, named after Nelson's autobiography), as well as the problems they face upon reaching motherhood.

== Production ==
Swati and Zaziwe came up with the idea of the series in 2010. The sisters pitched the idea to two producers in 2012.

The two Mandelas featured in the series made a press tour ahead of the February 2013 premiere in the United States (where they were raised), promoting that the Mandelas are "just a regular family" while also enabling American audiences to have a glance at the South African society of the time. The producers claim that no part was scripted, unlike many other reality productions. The series made it to South Africa on Fox, which at the time was exclusively on TopTV, in April 2013. NBCUniversal, producer of the series and owner of Cozi TV, claimed that the series had a rating of 38 million viewers, but did not provide concrete information.

== Criticism ==
The series received criticism in South Africa. When the series was yet to premiere there, Mail & Guardian columnist Rowan Philp compared the series to a production about Kenny Kunene, or even Real Housewives from Exile. Upon its South African premiere, Twitter users showed their criticism, including concerns that it was being used for the exploitation of Nelson Mandela's name. Local comedian Deep Fried Man thought it could spawn similar series with other historical figures, such as the grandchildren of Mahatma Gandhi or the Dalai Lama. Nelson Mandela Foundation spokesman Sello Hatang had not watched the series and was not expecting any gain, claiming it would not benefit the foundation. No information about its budget was available, including whether or not some of the proceeds went to Mandela-affiliated charities.
