= Desaparecidos (American TV series) =

American television series

Desaparecidos is an American television series (in Spanish) which began appearing on LAT TV on October 23, 2007, focusing on alleged cases of forced disappearance of Hispanics in the United States. The series includes a marketing tie-in to AOL Latino, which will host a website linked to the series. The TV series also links with many problems that Latin Americans face today including racism, sexism and the spread of gangs.
