= WXII-LD =

Television station in Cedar, Michigan

Currently silent
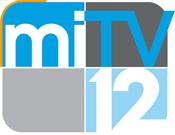
- Cedar–Traverse City–Cadillac, Michigan; United States
- City: Cedar, Michigan
- Channels: Digital: 30 (UHF); Virtual: 12
- Branding: MI TV 12

Programming
- Affiliations: 12.1: Cozi TV & MyNetworkTV; for others, see § Subchannels

Ownership
- Owner: Bridge Media Networks; (Bridge News LLC)
- Sister stations: WMNN-LD

History
- Founded: October 7, 1996
- First air date: January 2004
- Former call signs: W51CS (1996–2001); W12CX (2001–2003); WLLZ-LP (2003–2017); WXII-LP (2017–2021)
- Former channel numbers: Analog: 51 (UHF, 1996–2001), 12 (VHF, 2001–2021)
- Former affiliations: Urban America Television (2004–2006); America One (secondary 2004–2006 and 2008–2015, primary 2006–2008); The Sportsman Channel (secondary, until 2009); Retro TV (secondary, 2009–2015); Dark (July−September 2021)
- Call sign meaning: "XII" is the Roman numeral for 12

Technical information
- Licensing authority: FCC
- Facility ID: 16651
- ERP: 1.5 kW
- HAAT: 232.3 m (762 ft)
- Transmitter coordinates: 44°45′22″N 85°40′42″W
- Translator(s): WMNN-LD 26.4 Lake City

Links
- Public license information: LMS
- Website: mitv12.com

WXII-LD (channel 12) is a low-power television station in Cedar, Michigan, United States, serving the Traverse City–Cadillac area with programming from Cozi TV and MyNetworkTV. Owned by Bridge Media Networks, it is sister to Lake City-licensed WMNN-LD (channel 26). The two stations share studios on West 13th Street in Cadillac; WXII-LD's transmitter is located west of downtown Traverse City near Harris and Cedar Run roads.

Despite having a digital signal of its own, WXII-LD is only 1.5 kW whereas WMNN-LD is 15 kW, so WXII-LD is simulcast over WMNN-LD's fourth digital subchannel (26.4) to expand its over-the-air reach.

== History ==
On December 12, 1996, the Federal Communications Commission (FCC) issued a construction permit for a low-power television station on UHF channel 51 in Pinconning, Michigan, with the call sign W51CS. In 2001, the permit was moved to VHF channel 12 in Traverse City under call letters W12CX. In 2003, the call letters were changed to WLLZ-LP. From 1980 to 1996, the WLLZ calls were used by an album oriented rock FM radio station broadcasting on 98.7 in the Detroit area, nicknamed "Detroit's Wheelz" (later Smooth Jazz WVMV "V98.7" and now top-40 "AMP Radio" WDZH). After the FM station dropped the call letters, they were used for several years on an AM station in the market, and were picked up by Channel 12 after the AM station dropped them in 2003. WLLZ's owner at the time, P & P Cable Holdings, is known for picking up calls discarded by other Michigan radio and television stations for use on their own stations.

WLLZ-LP signed on in January 2004 as an affiliate of Urban America Television. It added America One programming to its schedule in Summer 2004. WLLZ became a full affiliate of the network in May 2006 when Urban America Television ceased operations.

Logo as "My TV 12", from 2008 until 2017

In June 2008, the station was added to Charter digital channel 202 throughout the northern Lower Peninsula. It moved to the basic tier on channel 72 in December 2008 and has now moved to channel 11 in 18 counties on Charter cable. Also in December 2008, WLLZ became a primary affiliate of MyNetworkTV; the station was then branded as "My TV 12". Until then, there was no local affiliate in the northern Michigan market.

On May 15, 2009, WLLZ discontinued an affiliation with The Sportsman Channel (which was phasing out its over-the-air affiliations) and added RTV, with America One programming significantly reduced (though not eliminated). Previously from 2007 until 2008, NBC affiliate WPBN-TV (channel 7) carried RTV on a second digital subchannel. This was dropped in favor of a simulcast of ABC affiliate WGTU (channel 29). Due to its low-powered status, WLLZ was exempt from switching to digital-only broadcasting on June 12, 2009.

The station discontinued their affiliation with America One in 2015, when it merged with Youtoo TV into Youtoo America, allowing a contractual out of that agreement. With the start of the 2015–16 season, WLLZ has wound down carrying nearly all of their syndicated programming, with Cozi TV being carried most of the day and MyNetworkTV on weeknights.

On November 1, 2017, the FCC approved the sale of WLLZ-LP to Freelancer Television Broadcasting, Inc. On December 4, 2017, the sale to Freelancer Television Broadcasting was completed, making it a sister station to WMNN-LD; the station then modified its branding to "MI TV 12". It changed its call sign to WXII-LP on December 21, 2017.

On April 23, 2019, the FCC granted WXII-LP a construction permit to operate a digital companion channel on UHF channel 30. In the meantime, digital over-the-air access to this station had been being provided through a simulcast over a digital subchannel of co-owned station WMNN-LD; that simulcast continued post-transition to improve this station's over-the-air reach and also to feed local cable systems. On September 14, 2021, WXII-LP commenced digital operations and the FCC changed this station's call sign to WXII-LD to reflect this station's new digital operations. Concurrent with the launch of this station's digital operations, a simulcast of sister station WMNN-LD, which carries programming from NewsNet, was added as a second subchannel. The subchannel was removed in August 2024 after the shutdown of NewsNet.

On January 13, 2022, Freelancer Television Broadcasting's portfolio, including NewsNet, WMNN-LD, and WXII-LD, were sold to investor Manoj Bhargava, with Eric Wotila retaining 10% ownership in the new company Bridge News, LLC. Under the terms of the deal, Bridge News would operate the stations via a time brokerage agreement with Freelancer Television Broadcasting. The sale was consummated on March 24.

== News programming ==
Until May 2009, WLLZ aired INN National News, a newscast produced by Independent News Network in Davenport, Iowa from America One. It also carried a video simulcast of an hour of radio station WMKT's morning show hosted by Greg Marshall. The simulcast was discontinued in early 2011.

In late 2017, following the station's callsign switch to WXII-LP, sister station WMNN-LD began producing 90-second news updates for channel 12 that aired during prime time over the first commercial break aired each hour. News programming expanded in March 2018, when WMNN-LD began producing hour-long 7:00 and 11:00 p.m. newscasts for the station each weeknight. The early newscast competes against a half-hour newscast produced by CBS affiliate WWTV (channel 9) that airs on Fox affiliate WFQX-TV (channel 32), while the 11:00 p.m. competes against longer-established late night newscasts on WWTV (and its Sault Ste. Marie satellite WWUP, channel 10), and WPBN-TV (and its Cheboygan satellite WTOM-TV, channel 4) as well as a pre-recorded broadcast on the latter's sister ABC affiliate, WGTU (and Sault Ste. Marie satellite WGTQ, channel 8).

== Technical information ==
=== Subchannels ===
The station's signal is multiplexed:

Subchannels of WXII-LD
Channel	Res.	Short name	Programming
12.1	480i	MITV 12	Cozi TV & MyNetworkTV
12.3	480i	SNH	Fun Roads TV
