= LAT TV =

American Spanish-language TV network

- Type: Broadcast television network
- Country: United States

Programming
- Language: Spanish

Ownership
- Owner: Latin America Broadcasting
- Key people: Wallace (Rocky) Springstead (President/CEO)

History
- Launched: May 19, 2006; 20 years ago
- Closed: May 20, 2008; 18 years ago

LAT TV was an American Spanish-language television network emphasizing family-oriented and educational programming. It was owned by Latin America Broadcasting of Houston, Texas and launched in May 2006, initially on five low-power television stations in Texas and Arizona, four of which were in top-ten Hispanic markets. The network folded in May 2008.

== History ==
LAT TV launched on May 19, 2006 with television stations in Houston, Austin, Dallas–Fort Worth and San Antonio, Texas, and in Phoenix, Arizona. On April 10, 2007, LAT TV announced a partnership with Equity Media Holdings that would affiliate 26 stations owned or controlled by Equity with LAT TV, effective May 30, 2007. The new affiliation expanded LAT TV coverage to 31 stations and to 27 markets in 15 states.

Citing a lack of investments caused by a lack of cable carriage, the network shut down May 20, 2008. The company planned to retain its broadcast licenses, but ultimately would sell its stations to other parties soon after.

== Programming ==
LAT TV was headed by Patricia Torres-Burd and her team.

LAT TV offered a wide variety of programming from Mexico, Latin America, Europe and the United States to serve a diverse Hispanic market. The schedule included telenovelas, sports, comedy, and children's programming. A half-hour network news program from Independent News Network, Noticias LAT TV, aired each night. Weekday mornings included a block of public-service programs. Friday nights featured boxing matches, Late Night Variety Show "La Boca Loca De Paul" hosted by Paul Bouche, and the afternoon children's programming block includes Topo Gigio, a show that has been popular in the Latino community since the 1960s.

== Technology ==
LAT TV was entirely based on Internet Protocol. Its IT Manager Aaron Ward and network operations manager Jay Ross built and oversaw the process.

== LAT TV Stations ==
=== Network-owned ===
- KCVH-LD channel 30, Houston, Texas (LAT TV flagship station; now owned by Daij Media)
- KVPA-LD channel 42, Phoenix, Arizona (now owned by Liberman Broadcasting)

=== Affiliates ===
Charter affiliates

- KVAT-LD channel 17, Austin, Texas
- KJJM-LP channel 34, Dallas, Texas
- KISA-LD channel 40, San Antonio, Texas

Affiliates added May 30, 2007

- KRBF-LP channel 59, Fayetteville, Arkansas
- K32GH channel 32, Fort Smith, Arkansas - repeating KRBF-LP
- KHUG-LP channel 14, Little Rock, Arkansas
- KWBF, channel 42, Little Rock, Arkansas - digital subchannel, repeating KHUG-LP (ceased January 2008; subchannel given to KATV due to collapse of KATV Tower)
- K20HZ channel 20, Palm Springs, California
- KIMG-LP channel 23, Ventura, California
- W43CE channel 43, St. Petersburg, Florida
- WSLF-LP channel 35, Port Saint Lucie, Florida
- WYGA-CA channel 55, Atlanta, Georgia
- WUHQ-LP channel 29, Grand Rapids, Michigan
- WJXF-LP channel 49, Jackson, Mississippi
- KEGS-LP channel 30, Las Vegas, Nevada
- K64GJ channel 64, Lawton, Oklahoma
- KUOK-CA channel 11, Oklahoma City, Oklahoma
- KADY-LP channel 34, Sherman, Texas
- KCBU channel 3 (DT), Price, Utah - digital subchannel
- KDEV channel 11 (DT), Cheyenne, Wyoming - digital subchannel

Announced for affiliation, but did not carry the network

- KHBS channel 40, Fort Smith, Arkansas - digital subchannel, repeating KRBF-LP
- W56EJ channel 56, Gainesville, Florida - was not on the air as of December 2007; never commenced broadcasting
- KTUW channel 16 (DT), Scottsbluff, Nebraska - digital subchannel
- KRRI-LP channel 25, Reno, Nevada
- KTVC channel 18 (DT), Roseburg, Oregon - digital subchannel
- KEAT-LP channel 22, Amarillo, Texas
- KEYU channel 31 (DT), Amarillo, Texas - digital subchannel
- WEVU-CA channel 4, Fort Myers, Florida
- KUSE-LP channel 58, Seattle, Washington

== See also ==
- Desaparecidos (American TV series)
