= KCVH-LD =

Television station in Houston

- Houston, Texas; United States
- Channels: Digital: 6 (VHF); Virtual: 6

Programming
- Affiliations: see § Subchannels

Ownership
- Owner: Daij Media, LLC

History
- Founded: November 2, 1988
- Former call signs: K30CV (1988–2005); KCVH-LP (2005–2011)
- Former channel numbers: Analog: 30 (UHF, 1988–2010); Digital: 30 (UHF, 2010–2019)
- Former affiliations: LAT TV (2006–2008); Dark (2008–2010)
- Call sign meaning: "KCV" from former callsign K30CV, Houston

Technical information
- Licensing authority: FCC
- Facility ID: 7079
- ERP: 3 kW
- HAAT: 407.1 m (1,336 ft)
- Transmitter coordinates: 29°33′45.2″N 95°30′35.9″W

Links
- Public license information: LMS

KCVH-LD (channel 6) is a low-power religious television station in Houston, Texas, United States. The station is owned by Daij Media. KCVH-LD's transmitter is located near Missouri City, Texas, in unincorporated northeastern Fort Bend County.

== History ==
It was formerly the flagship station for LAT TV, a Spanish-language network owned by Latin America Broadcasting. KCVH-LP was a charter station for the network, which launched in May 2006. In May 2008, LAT TV ceased broadcasting, and KCVH suspended operations on June 23, 2008.

In July 2009, the station was sold to Daij Media LLC. The station briefly returned to the air in February 2010 in analog as "Aleluya TV". An application to switch to digital broadcasting was granted by the FCC on February 25, 2010, the digital signal went on the air December 15, 2010, and religious programming began airing January 31, 2011.

== Subchannels ==
The station's signal is multiplexed:

Subchannels of KCVH-LD
Channel	Res.	Short name	Programming
6.1	1080i	ALELUYA	Aleluya TV (4:3 on LD2)
6.2	480i	ABN 2	Aleluya TV (4:3 on LD2)
6.9	480i		Independent
