= WMNN-LD =

Television station in Lake City, Michigan

- Lake City–Cadillac–Traverse City, Michigan; United States
- City: Lake City, Michigan
- Channels: Digital: 17 (UHF); Virtual: 26
- Branding: WMNN 26 Cadillac

Programming
- Affiliations: 26.1: Cozi TV; 26.2: Buzzr

Ownership
- Owner: Bridge Media Networks; (Bridge News LLC)
- Sister stations: WXII-LD

History
- Founded: December 13, 2010
- First air date: February 27, 2011
- Former channel numbers: Digital: 14 (UHF, 2011–2016)
- Former affiliations: Independent (2011–2019); NewsNet (2019–2024); ShopHQ (2024–2025); Binge TV (2025)
- Call sign meaning: Michigan News Network

Technical information
- Licensing authority: FCC
- Facility ID: 184267
- ERP: 15 kW
- HAAT: 171.3 m (562 ft)
- Transmitter coordinates: 44°14′26.8″N 85°18′59.8″W
- Translator(s): WXII-LD 30.2 (UHF) Cedar

Links
- Public license information: LMS
- Website: michigan.newsnetmedia.com

WMNN-LD (channel 26) is a low-power television station licensed to Lake City, Michigan, United States, serving the Cadillac–Traverse City area. It is owned by Bridge Media Networks alongside dual MyNetworkTV/Cozi TV affiliate WXII-LD (channel 12). The two stations share studios on West 13th Street in Cadillac; WMNN-LD's transmitter is located off M-55 east of the city.

WMNN-LD served as the flagship station of the 24/7 headline news service NewsNet until the network shut down in August 2024.

== Programming ==
=== NewsNet Northern Michigan (26.1) ===
Titlecard for MI News 26 from 2011 to June 2013

Former MI News 26 logo from 2016 to 2019.

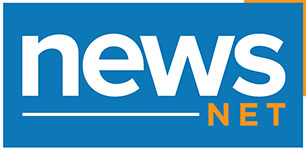
Former NewsNet Northern Michigan logo from 2019 to 2022.

WMNN's primary channel features a newswheel format, similar to what CNN Headline News initially used. The primary channel's format helped form the basis of NewsNet.

On weekdays, the station's rolling news programming is divided into five separate titles: NewsNet Mornings (morning news), Midday Edition (early and mid afternoon news), Continuing Coverage (late afternoon news), Evening Edition (early evening and prime time news), and Nightside Edition (overnight news). Meanwhile, weekend news coverage is branded as Weekend Edition.

In May 2016, the station reformatted, getting rid of pre-recorded anchors. The news wheel now features an eight-minute segment of news updated twice every day.

On December 9, 2019, coinciding with the new look of the national NewsNet service and a new studio, MI News 26 was rebranded as NewsNet Northern Michigan.

On September 14, 2021, an uninterrupted national feed of the NewsNet service, absent of any locally produced content, was added to the second subchannel of co-owned WXII-LD, coinciding with the launch of that station's digital operations. Programming on WXII-LD2 is very similar to WMNN-LD1, except that it airs the national feed of NewsNet instead of the locally produced NewsNet Northern Michigan feed.

On January 13, 2022, Freelancer Television Broadcasting's portfolio, including NewsNet, WMNN-LD, and WXII-LD, were sold to investor Manoj Bhargava, with Eric Wotila retaining 10% ownership in the new company Bridge News, LLC. Under the terms of the deal, Bridge News would operate the stations via a time brokerage agreement with Freelancer Television Broadcasting. The sale was consummated on March 24. NewsNet suspended all operations as of August 3, 2024. The station switched to ShopHQ programming, only for it to be replaced by Binge TV on April 17, 2025.

==== Live news coverage ====
NewsNet Northern Michigan does not offer regular live programming. The station does conduct live broadcasts, most notably during election nights, and commercial-free coverage of the Cherry-T Ball Drop in Traverse City on New Year's Eve.

During severe weather, the station broadcasts live cut-ins if necessary. Pre-taped weather segments sometimes alert viewers to monitor the news ticker at the bottom of the screen or to check the station's website for information.

==== Non-news programming ====
WMNN-LD became an alternate affiliate of The CW on February 25, 2023, when it began carrying the network's coverage of LIV Golf due to WFQX-TV owner Cadillac Telecasting Company's refusal to air the Saudi-owned tour on its second digital subchannel which carries The CW Plus.

=== TV 26 (26.2) ===
Originally "26 TV Classics", "TV 26" features classic TV shows like Bonanza, The Lone Ranger, Jack Benny, classic cartoons and more. On March 9, 2015, WMNN became an Antenna TV affiliate.

=== Laff 26 (26.3) ===
Cinema 26 featured a selection of "classic movies" and independent films. From August 23, 2011, to January 1, 2012, Cinema 26 was replaced by Universal Sports. This subchannel reverted to Cinema 26 on January 1, 2012, when Universal Sports became a cable and satellite-only channel. Cinema 26 was replaced again, this time by Laff on January 4, 2016.

== Subchannels ==
The station's signal is multiplexed:

Subchannels of WMNN-LD
| Channel | Res. | Short name | Programming |
|---|---|---|---|
| 26.1 | 480i | Cozi | Cozi TV |
| 26.2 | 480i | Buzzr | Buzzr |
