= Cozi TV =

American digital multicast television network

- Type: Free-to-air television network (classic TV)
- Country: United States
- Broadcast area: American coverage: 62%
- Headquarters: New York City, New York, U.S.

Programming
- Language: English
- Picture format: 480i (SDTV); 1080i 16:9 (HDTV; widescreen)

Ownership
- Parent: NBC Owned Television Stations (NBCUniversal Television and Streaming)
- Key people: Valari Staab (president, NBC Owned Television Stations); Meredith McGinn (SVP, Local Programming); Marni Kupfer (VP, Lifestyle Production)

History
- Launched: March 9, 2009; 17 years ago (as NBC Nonstop); January 1, 2013; 13 years ago (as Cozi TV)
- Former names: NBC Nonstop (2009–2012)

Links
- Website: www.cozitv.com

Availability

Terrestrial
- List of affiliates

Streaming media
- Service(s): Hulu + Live TV, YouTube TV, DirecTV Stream, FuboTV

Cozi TV (stylized as COZI TV) is an American free-to-air television network owned by the NBC Owned Television Stations division of NBCUniversal. The network airs mostly classic television sitcoms from the 1960s to the 2000s.

The network originated as a local news and lifestyle programming format that was launched between 2009 and 2011; it was seen on digital subchannels operated by nine owned-and-operated stations television stations of the NBC television network in the United States under the brand NBC Nonstop. The sitcoms and drama series now appearing on Cozi are primarily from the NBCUniversal Television Distribution program library. Cozi is available via AT&T U-verse, DirecTV, Dish Network, and streaming services YouTube TV, Hulu + Live TV, DirecTV Stream and FuboTV.

== History ==
=== NBC Nonstop ===
After NBCUniversal shut down NBC Weather Plus in December 2008 (shortly after the company, along with Blackstone Group and Bain Capital, purchased The Weather Channel), the company's flagship WNBC in New York City replaced Weather Plus' successor, automated local weather service, NBC Plus, on digital subchannel 4.2 on March 9, 2009, with NBC New York Nonstop, a channel that featured a mix of locally produced news and lifestyle programming.

On June 5, 2010, NBC Local Media appointed former WNBC General manager Tom O'Brien in the newly created position of Executive vice president of Nonstop Network. In October, WNBC sister stations WCAU and WRC-TV respectively launched their own versions of the Nonstop channel in the Philadelphia and Washington, D.C. markets. Chicago's WMAQ-TV launched its own local version in November 2010. NBC's three owned-and-operated stations in California (KNBC in Los Angeles, KNTV in San Jose, California-San Francisco and KNSD in San Diego) collaborated to launch the only regional Nonstop channel, NBC California Nonstop, in January 2011; Nonstop channels were also launched by KXAS-TV in Dallas-Fort Worth, Texas and WTVJ in Miami that same month. Each station's Nonstop subchannel carried eight hours of locally produced programming (usually in the form of additional local newscasts exclusive to the subchannel that were produced by each station for their respective market, and some lifestyle or talk-oriented programs), along with core programming from affiliated production company LXTV (such as Talk Stoop, First Look and Open House – the latter two of which were later picked up by NBC for its Saturday late-night lineup).

=== Cozi TV ===
In October 2011, NBC Station hired Meredith McGinn as a vice president to lead the development and launch of the network. On November 3, 2011, NBC Owned Television Stations announced that its seven local Nonstop subchannels would become a single national network under the proposed name NBC Nonstop Network (also to have been called NBC Nonstop or Nonstop Network); the format of the national network was originally planned to feature a format similar to the local Nonstop channels, which would have placed the network in direct competition with the Live Well Network. An NBC executive indicated that the independently formatted Nonstop channels were performing well, but needed separate programming. NBC stated that the network would carry reruns of classic television series during daytime hours and lifestyle programming at night, and that local stations would be able to preempt the national Nonstop Network programming to carry their own local content. By July 2012, it was announced that NBC was considering using a different name for the national network, with "Bob TV" among the names being put under consideration.

On October 17, 2012, Time Out reported that NBCUniversal would launch a new classic television network (similar to MeTV) called Cozi TV. This turned out to actually be the new name of the retooled national version of NBC Nonstop. NBC soft launched Cozi TV on its owned-and-operated stations as well as some charter affiliates on December 20, 2012; the network officially launched on January 1, 2013. McGinn was promoted to Senior vice president of Cozi TV and LXTV in July 2013.

== Programming ==
=== Current programming ===
- Bob Hearts Abishola (September 23, 2024–present)
- Columbo (January 1, 2017–present)
- George Lopez (December 1, 2025–present)
- Highway to Heaven (January 1, 2013–present)
- The Jeff Foxworthy Show (January 3, 2026–present)
- The King of Queens (September 9, 2024–present)
- Married... with Children (August 3, 2024–present)
- The Munsters (October 5, 2015–present)
- Murdoch Mysteries (January 5, 2013–present)
- The Nanny (January 1, 2018–present)
- Roseanne (January 6, 2020–present)
- Two and a Half Men (May 2, 2026–present)

=== Former programming ===
- 3rd Rock from the Sun (July 18, 2021 – June 28, 2024)
- Adam-12 (January 5, 2015 – December 27, 2019)
- The Adventures of Jim Bowie (February 24, 2014 – 2020)
- Alias Smith and Jones (January 1, 2013)
- Amen (January 3 – September 30, 2022)
- The A-Team (January 1, 2016 – December 29, 2019)
- The Avengers (February 24, 2014)
- Banacek (January 7, 2013 – December 30, 2023)
- Baywatch (August 1, 2015 – October 2, 2022)
- Being Mandela (February 10 – May 5, 2013)
- The Bionic Woman (January 1, 2013 – 2022)
- The Bold Ones (January 4, 2013)
- Bones (September 26, 2022 – August 31, 2025)
- Bronco (January 5, 2015)
- Charlie's Angels (January 1, 2013 – 2020)
- The Deputy
- The Dick Van Dyke Show (June 2, 2014)
- Dragnet (January 5, 2015 – December 28, 2019)
- Emergency! (January 2, 2017 – September 27, 2024)
- Fantasy Island (December 8, 2013)
- Frasier (September 12, 2016 – August 30, 2026)
- Gimme a Break! (January 3, 2022 – December 29, 2023)
- Hangin' with Mr. Cooper (May 4 – August 28, 2026)
- Hart to Hart
- Heartland (October 10, 2021 – August 2, 2024)
- Here's Lucy (August 11, 2014 – January 1, 2021)
- Hopalong Cassidy (January 5, 2013)
- Ironside
- I Spy (January 1, 2013)
- It Takes a Thief (January 5, 2015)
- Knight Rider
- Kojak
- Lassie (January 1, 2013)
- Las Vegas (October 1, 2022 – August 31, 2025)
- The Life and Legend of Wyatt Earp (January 5, 2015)
- Life with Elizabeth
- Little House on the Prairie (September 19, 2016 – August 29, 2025)
- The Lone Ranger (January 1, 2013)
- Magnum, P.I. (January 3, 2013)
- Malcolm & Eddie (December 1, 2025 – August 28, 2026)
- Make Room for Daddy/The Danny Thomas Show (February 24, 2014 – December 2021)
- Marcus Welby, M.D. (January 1, 2013)
- Maverick (December 26, 2013)
- McCloud (January 7, 2013 – September 7, 2024)
- McMillan & Wife (January 7, 2013 – September 7, 2024)
- Miami Vice (March 1, 2015)
- Monk (September 26, 2022 – August 31, 2025)
- Mr. and Mrs. North
- Murder, She Wrote (January 2, 2015 – December 2023)
- My Favorite Martian (April 6, 2015 – December 2019)
- The Name of the Game (August 2, 2013)
- The Office (January 1, 2019 – October 3, 2021)
- One Step Beyond
- Quantum Leap (May 25, 2015)
- Quincy, M.E. (September 19, 2016 – October 1, 2023)
- The Real McCoys (February 24, 2014)
- The Rockford Files (January 2, 2017)
- The Roy Rogers Show (January 1, 2013)
- Run for Your Life (August 5, 2013)
- Simon & Simon (August 3, 2015)
- The Six Million Dollar Man (January 2, 2013 – 2022)
- Starsky & Hutch (January 2, 2013–December 2021)
- The Steve Harvey Show (December 1, 2025 – August 28, 2026)
- Stories of the Century (January 4, 2013)
- Tales of Wells Fargo (January 1, 2013)
- VeggieTales (2015 – 2018)
- The Virginian (January 1, 2013)
- Will & Grace (September 28, 2017 2022)
- Zorro (January 5, 2015 – December 31, 2016)

== Affiliates ==
NBCUniversal broadcasts Cozi TV in most markets served by a station owned by the NBC Owned Television Stations group, either on subchannels of NBC or Telemundo stations. The network is also available on the digital subchannels of other television stations, primarily those affiliated with NBC. The network is available to stations on a barter basis, in which Cozi TV and its affiliates split the responsibility of selling advertising inventory as well as the commercial time allocated each hour.

The network soft-launched on NBC and Telemundo owned-and-operated stations in most markets, with NBC O&Os carrying the network in most markets where the company owns stations, and Telemundo O&Os carrying it in markets where an NBC does not own a television station.

The network's initial affiliates outside of the core NBC O&O group included KAIL-TV in Fresno, California, KVOA in Tucson, Arizona, KSNV-DT in Las Vegas and eight Texas stations owned by London Broadcasting Company, including KCEN-TV in Waco, Texas and its semi-repeater KAGS-LD in College Station, Texas, with a total initial reach of 26% of U.S. television households. By July 2013, the network's reach had expanded to 42% of the U.S., or an estimated 47.5 million households with at least one television set, and through affiliation deals with WMFP in Boston, KUBE-TV in Houston and the E. W. Scripps Company's KSHB-TV in Kansas City.

On June 2, 2014, Cozi TV's programming was made available on AT&T U-verse channel 578 and Dish Network channel 82 on a part-time basis, through a deal with LeSEA's Family Entertainment Television (FETV) network. LeSEA's relationship with Cozi TV was extended to its stations on June 17, 2014, when it signed an affiliation deal to carry the network on its stations in South Bend, Honolulu, Colorado Springs, Tulsa, St. Croix and New Orleans (WHMB-TV in Indianapolis was exempted from the agreement due to an existing affiliation contract with Dispatch Broadcast Group's WTHR and WALV-CD). Meredith Corporation and Media General both reached agreements in early 2015 to add Cozi TV to their multicast channels in a combined twelve markets. The network announced a deal with OTA Broadcasting, LLC to affiliate with KFFV in Seattle and WEPA-CD in Pittsburgh. Both deals expanded the network's reach to 60% of the U.S. Those deals expired on June 26, 2017; with WEPA-CD going off the air shortly afterwards, because that station sold its spectrum. ABC affiliate WTAE-TV picked up Cozi TV on January 8, 2018, replacing This TV. FETV now carries its own schedule of acquired programming.

Sometime in 2024, Cozi TV was taken off of Dish Network. According to Dish, "a fair offer to (NBCUniversal) to continue carrying COZI TV" was made and ultimately rejected leading to their contract expiring. In its place is a splash screen recommending other channels with similar programming and a link to a Dish Promise page explaining why the station is unavailable.

=== List of affiliates ===
List of affiliates for Cozi TV
Media market	State/Dist./Terr.	Station	Channel
Birmingham	Alabama	WVUA	23.1
Birmingham	Alabama	WVUA-CD	7.1
Huntsville	Alabama	WTZT-CD	11.1
Mobile	Alabama	WALA-TV	10.2
Montgomery	Alabama	WIYC	48.1
Anchorage	Alaska	KTBY	4.3
Phoenix	Arizona	KPHO-TV	5.2
Phoenix	Arizona	KTAZ	39.3
Tucson	Arizona	KVOA	4.2
Fayetteville–Fort Smith	Arkansas	KFFS-CD/KQRY-LD	36.1
Eureka	California	KBVU-TV	28.2
Fresno	California	KGMC	43.8
Fresno	California	KNSO	51.3
Los Angeles	California	KNBC	4.2
Sacramento	California	KAHC-LD	43.3
Monterey–Salinas–Santa Cruz	California	K15CU-D	15.1
San Diego	California	KNSD	39.2
San Francisco	California	KNTV	11.2
Santa Barbara	California	KVMM-CD	41.3
Denver	Colorado	KDEN-TV	25.3
Denver	Colorado	KUSA-TV	9.2
Grand Junction	Colorado	KLML	20.1
Hartford–New Haven	Connecticut	WVIT	30.2
Washington	District of Columbia	WRC-TV	4.2
Fort Myers	Florida	WGPS-LD	22.1
Jacksonville	Florida	WJAX-TV	47.2
Miami–Fort Lauderdale	Florida	WTVJ	6.2
Orlando	Florida	WKMG-TV	6.3
Panama City	Florida	WJHG-TV	7.7
Tampa–St. Petersburg	Florida	WTTA	38.2
West Palm Beach	Florida	WXOD-LD	24.4
Atlanta	Georgia	WANF	46.2
Albany	Georgia	WALB	10.6
Augusta	Georgia	WRDW-TV	12.7
Columbus	Georgia	W29FD	29.5
Savannah	Georgia	WSCG	34.3
Boise	Idaho	KKJB	39.2
Pocatello–Idaho Falls	Idaho	KVUI	31.4
Twin Falls	Idaho	KBAX-LD	27.3
Chicago	Illinois	WMAQ-TV	5.2
Decatur	Illinois	WAND	17.2
Rockford	Illinois	WQRF-TV	39.4
Angola	Indiana	WINM	12.4
Evansville	Indiana	WEHT	25.3
Fort Wayne	Indiana	WEIJ-LD	24.4
Kokomo–Indianapolis	Indiana	WTTK	29.3
Cedar Falls	Iowa	KFKZ-LD	35.1
Davenport–Bettendorf	Iowa	KWQC-TV	6.3
Des Moines	Iowa	KCYM-LD	45.6
Des Moines	Iowa	WOI-DT	5.4
Dodge City	Kansas	KDDC-LD	23.1
Garden City	Kansas	KGCE-LD	23.1
Liberal	Kansas	KSWE-LD	23.1
Sublette	Kansas	KDGL-LD	23.1
Ulysses	Kansas	KDGU-LD	23.1
Wichita	Kansas	KAGW-CD	26.1
Topeka	Kansas	KTKA-TV	49.2
Bowling Green	Kentucky	WCZU-LD	39.7
Lexington	Kentucky	WLJC-TV	65.1
Louisville	Kentucky	WBKI	58.2
Paducah	Kentucky	WPSD-TV	6.2
Alexandria	Louisiana	KBCA	41.4
Baton Rouge	Louisiana	WGMB-TV	44.3
Lafayette	Louisiana	KLWB	50.5
New Orleans	Louisiana	WUPL	54.5
Shreveport	Louisiana	KTAL-TV	6.3
Baltimore	Maryland	WQAW-LD	69.3
Salisbury	Maryland	WRDE-LD	31.2
Boston	Massachusetts	WBTS-CD	15.2
Boston	Massachusetts	WNEU	60.4
Springfield	Massachusetts	WSHM-LD	33.2
Cadillac–Traverse City	Michigan	WMNN-LD	26.5
Cadillac–Traverse City	Michigan	WXII-LD	12.1
Detroit	Michigan	WDIV-TV	4.2/4.4
Flint	Michigan	WNEM-TV	5.3
Battle Creek–Grand Rapids	Michigan	WOTV	41.4
Minneapolis–Saint Paul	Minnesota	KJNK-LD	25.3
Cleveland	Mississippi	WHCQ-LD	8.4
Columbia–Jefferson City	Missouri	KRMS-LD	32.1
Kansas City	Missouri	KSMO-TV	62.4
St. Louis	Missouri	KMOV	4.3
Springfield	Missouri	KYCW-LD	33.2
Helena	Montana	KTVH-DT	12.3
Omaha	Nebraska	WOWT	6.2
Las Vegas	Nevada	KBLR	39.4
Albany–Schenectady–Troy	New York	WTEN	10.2
Buffalo	New York	WIVB-TV	4.2
Rochester	New York	WGCE-CD	6.4
New York City	New York	WNBC	4.2
Syracuse	New York	WSYT	68.2
Utica	New York	WVVC-LD	40.4
Charlotte	North Carolina	WCCB	18.8
Raleigh	North Carolina	WRAL-TV	5.2
Smithfield	North Carolina	WARZ-LD	21.4
Wilmington	North Carolina	WTMV-LD	29.1
Bismarck–Mandan	North Dakota	KNDB	26.4
Minot	North Dakota	KNDM	24.4
Valley City–Fargo–Grand Forks	North Dakota	KRDK-TV	4.1
Cincinnati	Ohio	WBQC-LD	25.2
Cleveland	Ohio	WKYC	3.3
Columbus	Ohio	WCSN-LD	32.2
Portsmouth	Ohio	WTZP-LD	50.1
Toledo	Ohio	WMNT-CD	48.4
Zanesville	Ohio	WHIZ-TV	18.2
Oklahoma City	Oklahoma	KAUT-TV	43.4
Tulsa	Oklahoma	KMYT-TV	41.2
Eugene	Oregon	KORY	15.2
Klamath Falls	Oregon	KOTI	2.2
Medford	Oregon	KOBI	5.2
Portland–Salem	Oregon	KPTV	12.2
Altoona–Johnstown–State College	Pennsylvania	WATM-TV	23.3
Erie	Pennsylvania	WJET-TV	24.4
Philadelphia	Pennsylvania	WCAU-TV	10.2
Pittsburgh	Pennsylvania	WTAE-TV	4.2
Scranton–Wilkes-Barre	Pennsylvania	WYOU	22.4
Aguadilla	Puerto Rico	WSJP-LD	18.1
Providence	Rhode Island	WYCN-LD	8.3
Charleston	South Carolina	WBSE-LD	20.2
Columbia	South Carolina	WKTC	63.3
Myrtle Beach	South Carolina	WFXB	43.7
Greenville	South Carolina	WHNS	21.2
Sioux Falls	South Dakota	KDLT-TV	46.4
Chattanooga	Tennessee	WYHB-CD	39.6
Jackson	Tennessee	WYJJ-LD	27.7
Kingsport–Johnson City–Bristol	Tennessee	WKPT-TV	19.1
Knoxville	Tennessee	WATE-TV	6.4
Memphis	Tennessee	WATN-TV	24.3
Nashville	Tennessee	WSMV-TV	4.3
Abilene	Texas	KXVA	15.3
Amarillo	Texas	KFDA-TV	10.5
Austin	Texas	KXAN-TV	36.2
Bryan–College Station	Texas	KAGS-LD	23.2
Corpus Christi	Texas	KIII	3.4
Dallas–Fort Worth	Texas	KXAS-TV	5.2
Harlingen	Texas	KTLM	40.3
Houston	Texas	KTMD	47.4
Longview–Tyler	Texas	KPKN-LD	33.5
Lubbock	Texas	KMYL-LD	14.4
Port Arthur–Beaumont	Texas	KBMT	12.3
San Angelo	Texas	KIDY	6.3
San Antonio	Texas	KVDA	60.3
Waco	Texas	KCEN-TV	6.2
Saint Croix	U.S. Virgin Islands	WCVI	23.3
Salt Lake City	Utah	KSL-TV	5.2
Petersburg–Richmond	Virginia	WRIC	8.3
Roanoke–Lynchburg	Virginia	WZBJ-CD	24.2
Virginia Beach–Norfolk–Hampton	Virginia	WVBT	43.4
Seattle–Tacoma	Washington	KIRO-TV	7.2
Spokane	Washington	KREM-TV	2.9
Yakima	Washington	KYPK-LD	32.5
Charleston	West Virginia	WTZP-LD	50.1
Clarksburg	West Virginia	WUSV-LD	16.1
Summersville–Beckley–Bluefield	West Virginia	WZTS-LD	16.1
Eau Claire–La Crosse	Wisconsin	WEAU	13.2
Madison	Wisconsin	WIFS	57.9
Milwaukee	Wisconsin	WIWN	68.1
Rhinelander	Wisconsin	WJFW-TV	12.2
Casper	Wyoming	KTWO-TV	2.2
