= KSVN (AM) =

- Ogden, Utah; United States
- Broadcast area: Salt Lake City metropolitan area
- Frequency: 730 kHz
- Branding: La Mexicana 99.9

Programming
- Format: Regional Mexican

Ownership
- Owner: Azteca Broadcasting Corporation

History
- First air date: September 28, 1947
- Former call signs: KSLO (1946); KLWT (1946–1947); KOPP (1947–1956); KKOG (1956–1959)
- Call sign meaning: "Seven" (from former "K-7" branding)

Technical information
- Licensing authority: FCC
- Facility ID: 57444
- Class: D
- Power: 1,000 watts day; 66 watts night
- Transmitter coordinates: 41°11′17″N 112°4′55″W
- Translator: 99.9 K260DC (North Salt Lake)

Links
- Public license information: Public file; LMS
- Website: lamexicana99.com

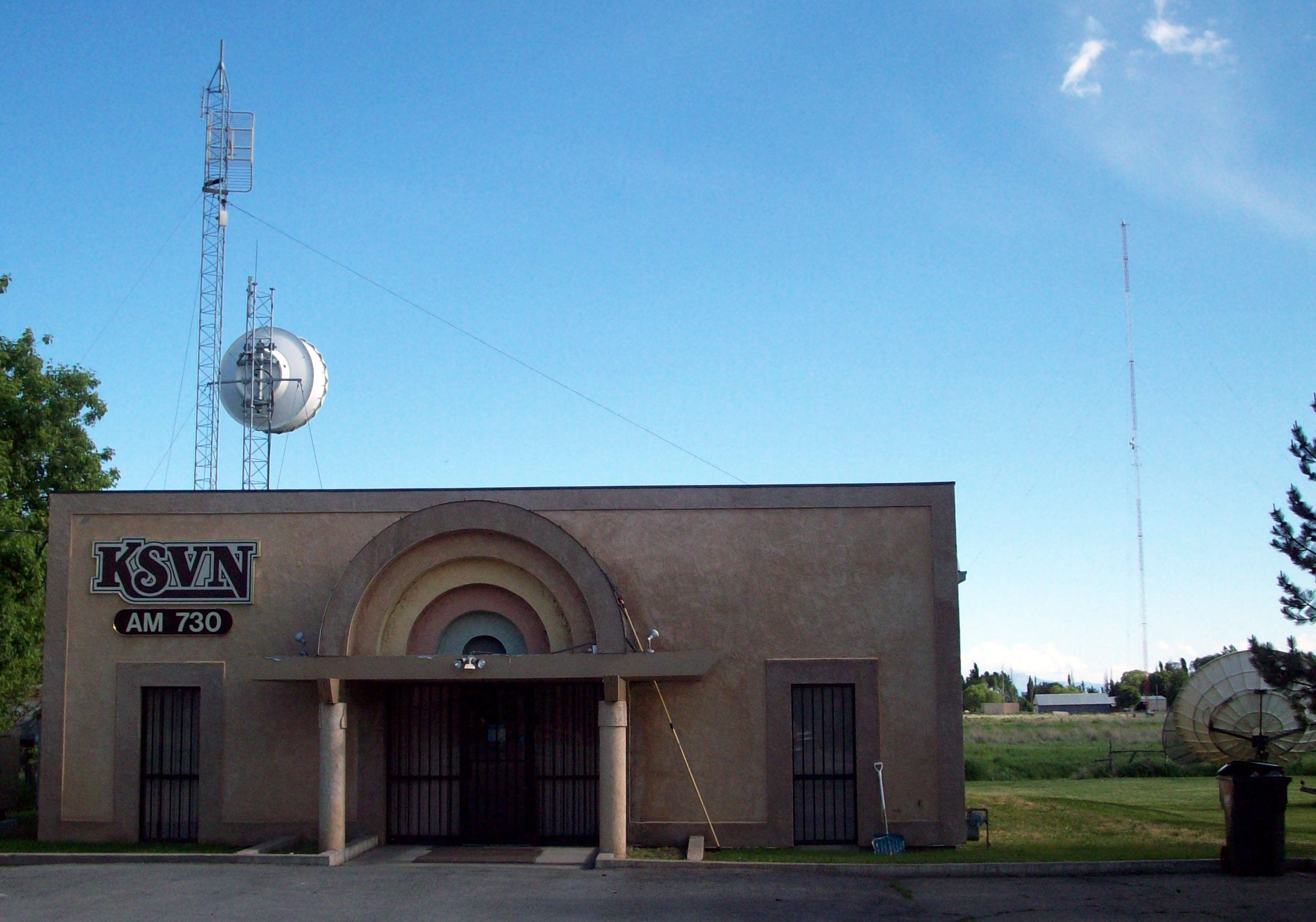
The KSVN studios and transmitter, near Hooper, Utah.

KSVN (730 kHz) is an AM radio station broadcasting a Regional Mexican format. Licensed to Ogden, Utah, United States, it serves the Ogden and Salt Lake City areas. The station is currently owned by Azteca Broadcasting Corporation.

== History ==
KSVN began broadcasting as an English-language station, KOPP, on September 28, 1947. Before its sign on, the station was assigned the call letters KSLO (which were withdrawn following objections from KLO and KSL) and KLWT; the KOPP call sign was assigned on June 13, 1947. The call letters were changed to KKOG on April 9, 1956, and KSVN on November 29, 1959.

In the 1960s, KSVN was known as "K-7 Radio", also known as "K-730 Radio", and was owned by the same group that owned KSXX "K-630" in Salt Lake City. The two stations were sister top 40 stations before KCPX (1320) became a top 40 powerhouse in the mid-1960s (KSXX changed to a talk format station in 1965, and later changed call letters to KTKK). In 1989, KSVN began broadcasting in Spanish.
