= Manoj Bhargava =

Indian-American billionaire

- Born: 1953 (age 72–73); Lucknow, India
- Citizenship: United States
- Education: Woodstock School, The Hill School, Princeton University (dropped out)
- Occupations: Entrepreneur, philanthropist
- Known for: 5-hour Energy

Manoj Bhargava (born 1953) is an Indian American billionaire businessman. He is the founder of Innovations Ventures, which produces the 5-hour Energy drink, a product he created and launched in 2004. Bhargava has created a number of other ventures as well, many of which have been based out of a technology park he built in Farmington Hills, Michigan.

For half of 2023, Bhargava controlled publishing for Sports Illustrated, an arrangement followed by a lawsuit alleging breach of contract and failure to make payments. The U.S. Food and Drug Administration (FDA) has investigated 5-Hour Energy over numerous potentially linked fatalities. Its owner Living Essentials has been sued by dozens of state attorneys general for deceptive advertising, resulting in a $4.3 million penalty in a Washington state case.

Bhargava joined the Giving Pledge in 2012, and his Billions in Change organization funds humanitarian projects. He has founded a number of charity organizations, including the Rural India Supporting Trust and the Hans Foundation. As of 2025, his philanthropic activities were the subject of a US federal investigation.

== Early life and education ==
Bhargava was born in Lucknow, Uttar Pradesh, India in 1953. He spent his early years living with his family in Lucknow's Khayali Ganj neighborhood. His father, publisher Narottam Bhargava, had a book store on the ground floor of their house. The family of five moved to a larger house when he was six years old, also in Lucknow, with Bhargava attending Lucknow's Mahanagar Boy's High School. When he was 10, he began attending Woodstock School in Mussoorie. At the age of 14, he moved with his family to the United States, where his father pursued a doctorate at the University of Pennsylvania's Wharton School. After showing an aptitude for mathematics, Bhargava attended The Hill School on a scholarship and enrolled at Princeton University in 1972. He left the university after one year.

In 1974, Bhargava returned to India and spent more than a decade at an ashram named Hanslok, which was associated with Guru Shri Hans Ji Maharaj.

== Career ==
=== Early projects, Living Essentials (1980s–2011) ===
Bhargava returned to the United States in the mid-1980s and joined his family's plastics manufacturing business in Indiana. He later acquired and managed several plastics companies, ultimately selling the business in 2006 to a private equity firm. He moved to the Detroit area in 1994 to be close to his wife's family. He formed Innovative Ventures LLC, his first venture, in 1998. Among its first products was Chaser, an anti-hangover pill. He created Living Essentials as an arm of Innovative Ventures to market the product, with the Chaser venture ultimately short-lived.

After attending a natural products trade show in 2003, Bhargava developed a two-ounce caffeinated beverage, naming it 5-hour Energy. He launched the product in 2004. Marketing and distribution were handled by Living Essentials LLC, which was set up as a subsidiary of his company Innovations Ventures. With Bhargava as CEO of both Innovation Ventures and Living Essentials, the product gained market traction. Living Essentials had estimated retail sales of $1 billion in 2011, and by 2012, Living Essentials, according to Forbes, was "the biggest player by far" in the energy shot market. Much of its retail dominance was attributed to Bhargava successfully pursuing copycat products with lawsuits. In November 2011, Living Essentials won a trademark infringement case it had filed in 2008 against a competitor, one of seven federal cases the company resolved that year.

=== Investment firms and Stage 2 (2007–2015) ===
With Bhargava as the investment firm's CEO, MicroDose Life Sciences was formed in 2007. The firm made its first investments in 2010. Bhargava confirmed in 2011 that he was building a technology park in Farmington Hills. He set up a campus of 10 buildings, where he launched a number of enterprises and venture funds such as Plymouth Real Estate Holdings LLC. By 2011, he had founded two venture capital firms: Lifeline Ventures LLC, and ETC Capital LLC. He launched his third investment fund, Stage 2 Innovations, in May 2011 with $100 million of his own funding. Formed with Tom LaSorda, the manufacturing venture laboratory invests in projects intended to help impoverished communities.

In 2013, Bhargava founded Renew Group Private Ltd., a joint-venture research operation based in Singapore and associated with Stage 2. He founded a new private equity firm, Oakland Energy and Water Ventures, in Michigan in March 2014. Operating as a Stage 2 spinoff, Oakland Energy and Water Ventures LLC focuses on water treatment and energy conservation projects. Also in 2014, he financed a New York City-based film distribution company, Bleecker Street. By 2015, he had reportedly formed 70 limited liability companies in Michigan overall. He continued to own 80% of 5-Hour Energy, with the brand operated by Innovation Ventures, Living Essentials, and MicroDose Sales.

By 2015, engineers at his Stage 2 venture were working on three projects: the Rain Maker, intended to convert large amounts of any existing water into potable water, Free Electric, a bicycle-based electrical system, and Renew ECP, a medical device meant to promote blood flow. The latter project was being engineered in Singapore, while the Rain Maker project was being tested at a desalination research facility in New Mexico.

=== Political donations (2009-2015) ===
By 2015, Bhargava and his companies had become major political donors in the US, contributing at least $5.3 million to state-level political campaigns from 2009 to 2015. This included state attorneys general, their associations, and groups such as the Republican Governors Association, in the latter case through ETC Capital, with $2.5 million in 2014. The Center for Public Integrity noted that the timing of the donations coincided with state-level investigations and lawsuits targeting 5-hour Energy. After a New York Times article highlighting contributions to the attorneys general, "Bhargava and his company accused attorneys general of soliciting political contributions from the company while it was being investigated by them."

=== Living Essentials lawsuits and Hans Power (2010s–2021) ===
Living Essentials' sales had declined by the early 2010s, with 5-hour Energy involved in legal matters relating to marketing and product safety. After receiving filings citing 5-hour Energy in relation to consumer deaths and serious health incidents, by 2015 the U.S. Food and Drug Administration (FDA) was investigating more than 20 fatalities potentially linked to the product. By that time, attorneys general in several states had also initiated legal action against 5-Hour Energy, alleging deceptive advertising. 33 states had jointly investigated the company. The company also faced consolidated class-action lawsuits from consumers alleging false advertising. In 2017, a Washington state court ruled that 5-hour Energy's advertising had violated consumer protection laws, ordering a fine of $4.3 million. Living Essentials denied wrongdoing but paid the penalties.

In 2018, a group of wholesalers filed an antitrust lawsuit against Living Essentials. The suit alleged that the company provided Costco Wholesale with exclusive discount pricing in violation of U.S. price discrimination laws. In 2024, the U.S. Supreme Court declined to hear an appeal from the company, allowing the lawsuit to proceed.

In 2019, he founded Hans Power and Water LLC, with Tom LaSorda as CEO. The company's first product, the Hans Premium Water Appliance, is a whole-home water purifying system. In April 2019, Hans Power and Water received town approval to build a manufacturing plant in Lyon Township. It opened a storefront in May 2019.

=== Media acquisitions (2022–2024) ===
Bhargava began building a news operations in Farmington Hills in 2021, naming it Bridge Media Networks. He bought the initial platform for Bridge in 2022, from Eric Wotila in Cadillac, Michigan, and then began acquiring dozens of US TV stations. Through his companies Bridge News LLC and MBX Wyoming, in January 2022 he purchased 90% of Freelancer Television Broadcasting, which owned networks and stations such as NewsNet, WMNN-LD and WXII-LD. In August 2023, Bhargava's Bridge Media Networks acquired a majority stake in The Arena Group, owner of several magazine brands, for $100 million. The Arena Group at the time published over 265 media brands, including Sports Illustrated, TheStreet, Parade Media, Men’s Journal, and HubPages. Arena agreed to combine with Bridge Media Networks in November 2023.

In December 2023, Bhargava was named interim CEO of Arena Group, gaining control of the publishing operations for Sports Illustrated. He stepped down in early 2024, with Arena stating it was to "avoid any conflicts of interest" related to pending transactions. In March 2024, Minute Media took over the licensing agreement with Sports Illustrated from Arena Group, ending Bhargava's association with the magazine after six months. Authentic Brands Group, the owner of Sports Illustrated, sued Bhargava in April 2024 for breach of contract, seeking $50 million in damages. The lawsuit, which described Bhargava as a "gangster" and accused him of making discriminatory remarks, alleged he failed to make millions in licensing payments and had planned to terminate the magazine's staff. By May 2024, Bridge Media Network consisted mainly of NewsNet, as well as the SportsNews and Highlights channels. In August 2024, NewsNet and its sister network SportsNews ceased operations.

=== Recent developments (2023–2026) ===
In 2023, Bhargava launched several hydration drink brands – True Hydration, Cellular Hydration, and Natural Glow Hydration. Also in 2023, he gained control of ShopHQ and acquired a minor stakes in Audacy, which owned 235 radio stations and a podcast network. He also acquired a minor stake in Cumulus Media, owner of WJR-AM radio in Detroit. In late 2023, as an owner or investor he remained involved with the companies HANS Premium Water, Diagnostic Green, Stage2 Innovations, and Bleecker Street Entertainment. He remained the head or founder of Innovations Ventures LLC, Simplify Inventions LLC, IV Media LLC and Bridge Media Networks LLC.

In 2024, Bhargava had invested in the development of Cerezen ECP, a therapy which uses external counter pulsation to increase blood flow. While the FDA had approved the treatment for cardiovascular health, Bhargava was seeking to arrange a trial to test its efficacy at mitigating Alzheimer's disease.

Despite the initial fanfare, India West stated in 2024 some of the projects worked on by his Stage 2 venture had "proved impractical", with the electrical bike, for example, expensive and inefficient. The bike and ocean water conversion projects had been dropped by 2024, with the lab focusing instead on products such as its Hans Premium water filtration system, as well as a system aiding farmers in making their own fertilizer. Vitamin Energy filed a $1 billion lawsuit against Bhargava and Living Essentials in late 2024, alleging monopolistic practices and false advertising regarding the benefits of 5-Hour Energy. The lawsuit was dismissed in 2025. In April 2025, Bhargava's Singapore-based company Renew Group Private sold its shares in Cumulus Media. Renew Group remained the largest stakeholder in Audacy. His company Hans Scientific, by late 2025, had constructed one drug manufacturing plant in the United States, and was in the process of building six others.

== Philanthropy ==
Bhargava joined the Giving Pledge in 2012, pledging to donate over 90% of his fortune. He has founded a number of charity organizations, such as the Rural India Supporting Trust. In 2009, he co-founded the Hans Foundation, which aims to "provide clean water, reliable electricity and sufficient food to impoverished regions in India." By 2014, the Hans Foundation had contributed to 151 non-profits. Bhargava's Billions in Change initiative, which funds humanitarian projects, was featured in the documentary film Billions in Change in 2015. It was made by Film 45, a production company launched by Peter Berg.

=== Tax evasion investigation ===
His charitable giving methods have been the subject of investigation. In 2009, he donated 45% of Living Essentials, valued at approximately $1 billion, to the Rural India Supporting Trust, a charity he established. The trust later sold this stake to a separate entity linked to Bhargava in exchange for a $624 million promissory note. This transaction allowed Bhargava to claim a large tax deduction. Investigating the transaction, in 2018 the Internal Revenue Service (IRS) disqualified several hundred million dollars in tax deductions. After a federal grand jury requested 12 years of his financial records in 2021, The U.S. Senate Finance Committee was examining the transactions by 2024, focusing on offshore holdings and possibly improperly claimed charitable deductions. Senator Ron Wyden, chair of the Senate Finance Committee, suggested the case could result in one of the largest tax penalties in U.S. history. With Bhargava denying his donations failed to comply with all tax guidelines, the investigation was ongoing as of 2025.

== Personal life ==
Bhargava and his wife Sadhna live in Farmington Hills, Michigan. Their son, Shaan, is director of special projects at the Hans Foundation.

== See also ==
- List of people from Lucknow
- List of people from Pennsylvania
- List of Indian Americans
- List of Asian Americans
- List of The Hill School alumni
