= List of stations owned or operated by Sinclair Broadcast Group =

Sinclair Broadcast Group, a publicly traded American telecommunications conglomerate, owns or operates 295 television stations across the United States in 89 markets ranging in size from as large as Washington, D.C. to as small as North Platte, Nebraska. Several of these stations are owned by affiliate companies with varying ties to Sinclair—including Cunningham Broadcasting, Deerfield Media, and Howard Stirk Holdings—and operated by Sinclair using local marketing agreements.

== Current stations ==
Stations are arranged alphabetically by state and by city of license.

- (**) indicates a station that was built and signed-on by Sinclair.

Media market	State/Dist.	Station	Purchased	Affiliation	Notes
Birmingham	Alabama	WABM	2001	MyNetworkTV; ABC	
Birmingham	Alabama	WBMA-LD	2014	ABC	
Birmingham	Alabama	WDBB	1995	Independent; ABC	(Note: Owned by Cunningham Broadcasting.)
Birmingham	Alabama	WTTO	1995	Independent	
Mobile	Alabama	WEAR-TV	1997	ABC; NBC	
Mobile	Alabama	WFGX	2001	MyNetworkTV	
Mobile	Alabama	WJTC	2012	Independent	(Note: Owned by Deerfield Media.)
Mobile	Alabama	WPMI-TV	2012	Roar	
Little Rock	Arkansas	KATV	2014	ABC	
Bakersfield	California	KBAK-TV	2013	CBS; Fox	
Bakersfield	California	KBFX-CD	2013	Fox	
Chico–Redding	California	KRCR-TV	2017	ABC; Fox	
Chico–Redding	California	KXVU-LD	2017	Antenna TV	
Chico–Redding	California	KCVU	2017	Roar	
Chico–Redding	California	KRVU-LD	2017	MyNetworkTV	
Chico–Redding	California	KZVU-LD	2017	MyNetworkTV	(Note: Satellite of KRVU-LD.)
Chico–Redding	California	KUCO-LD	2017	Univision	
Chico–Redding	California	KKTF-LD	2017	UniMás	
Eureka	California	KAEF-TV	2017	ABC; Fox	(Note: Semi-satellite of KRCR.)
Eureka	California	KBVU	2017	Roar	(Note: Semi-satellite of KCVU.)
Eureka	California	KECA-LD	2017	CW+; MyNetworkTV	
Eureka	California	KEUV-LD	2017	Univision	
Fresno	California	KMPH-TV	2013	Fox	
Fresno	California	KMPH-CD	2013	Fox	
Fresno	California	KFRE-TV	2013	The CW	
Washington	District of Columbia	WJLA-TV	2014	ABC	
Washington	District of Columbia	WDCO-CD	2020	Roar	
Washington	District of Columbia	WIAV-CD	2020	Roar	
Gainesville	Florida	WGFL	2014	CBS; MyNetworkTV; NBC	(Note: Owned by New Age Media.)
Gainesville	Florida	WNBW-DT	2014	Roar	(Note: Owned by MPS Media and operated by New Age Media and Sinclair.)
Gainesville	Florida	WYME-CD	2014	Antenna TV	
Tallahassee	Florida	WTWC-TV	1998	NBC; Fox	
Tallahassee	Florida	WTLF	2014	CW+	
West Palm Beach	Florida	WPEC	2012	CBS	
West Palm Beach	Florida	WTVX	2012	The CW; MyNetworkTV	
West Palm Beach	Florida	WTCN-CD	2012	MyNetworkTV	
West Palm Beach	Florida	WWHB-CD	2012	Roar	
Albany	Georgia	WFXL	2013	Fox	
Macon	Georgia	WGXA	2014	Fox; ABC	
Savannah	Georgia	WTGS	2014	Fox	
Boise	Idaho	KBOI-TV	2013	CBS; CW+	
Boise	Idaho	KYUU-LD	2013	CW+	
Lewiston	Idaho	KLEW-TV	2013	CBS	(Note: Semi-satellite of KIMA-TV.)
South Bend	Indiana	WSBT-TV	2016	CBS; Fox	
South Bend	Indiana	WSJV	2025	Roar	
Cedar Rapids	Iowa	KGAN	1998	CBS; Fox	
Cedar Rapids	Iowa	KFXA	(Note: Owned by a local independent or private company.)	Roar	
Des Moines	Iowa	KDSM-TV	1997	Fox	
Sioux City	Iowa	KPTH	2013	Fox; MyNetworkTV/Roar; CBS	
Sioux City	Iowa	KBVK-LD	2013	Fox; MyNetworkTV/Roar; CBS	(Note: Satellite of KPTH.)
Sioux City	Iowa	KMEG	2025	Roar	
Wichita	Kansas	KSAS-TV	2012	Fox; MyNetworkTV	
Wichita	Kansas	KAAS-TV	2012	Fox; MyNetworkTV	
Wichita	Kansas	KOCW	2012	Fox; MyNetworkTV	
Wichita	Kansas	KMTW		Roar	
Paducah	Kentucky	KBSI	2025	Fox	(Note: Previously owned from 1998 to 2021.) (Note: Owned by Rincon Broadcasting Group.)
Paducah	Kentucky	WDKA	2025	MyNetworkTV	
Portland	Maine	WGME-TV	1998	CBS; Fox	
Portland	Maine	WPFO	2013	Roar	
Baltimore	Maryland	WBFF **	1971	Fox; MyNetworkTV	
Baltimore	Maryland	WNUV	1994	The CW	
Baltimore	Maryland	WUTB	2013	Roar	
Flint	Michigan	WEYI-TV	2013	Roar	
Flint	Michigan	WBSF	2013	The CW	
Flint	Michigan	WSMH	1996	Fox; NBC	
Grand Rapids	Michigan	WWMT	2012	CBS; Independent	
Sault Ste. Marie	Michigan	WGTQ	2013	ABC; NBC	(Note: Satellite of WGTU.)
Sault Ste. Marie	Michigan	WTOM-TV	2013	NBC; ABC	(Note: Satellite of WPBN-TV.)
Traverse City	Michigan	WGTU	2013	ABC; NBC	
Traverse City	Michigan	WPBN-TV	2013	NBC; ABC	
Minneapolis–Saint Paul	Minnesota	WUCW	1998	The CW	
Jefferson City	Missouri	KRCG	2013	CBS	
St. Louis	Missouri	KDNL-TV	1997	Independent	
Butte	Montana	KTVM-TV	2017	NBC	(Note: Semi-satellite of KECI-TV.)
Bozeman	Montana	KDBZ-CD	2017	NBC	(Note: Satellite of KTVM-TV.)
Kalispell	Montana	KCFW-TV	2017	NBC	
Missoula	Montana	KECI-TV	2017	NBC	
Hayes Center	Nebraska	KWNB-TV			(Note: Satellite of KHGI-TV.)
Lincoln	Nebraska	KFXL-TV	2016	Fox	
Lincoln	Nebraska	KHGI-TV	2016	ABC; Fox	
McCook	Nebraska	KWNB-LD	2016	ABC; Fox	
North Platte	Nebraska	KHGI-CD	2016	ABC	
Omaha	Nebraska	KPTM	2013	Fox; MyNetworkTV/Dabl; The CW	
Omaha	Nebraska	KXVO		Roar	
Elko	Nevada	KENV-DT		Roar	
Las Vegas	Nevada	KSNV	1997	NBC; Estrella TV	(Note: Assumed the intellectual property of KSNV-DT in 2014 from Intermountain West Communications Company; the former KSNV-DT's license was sold to Howard Stirk Holdings and renamed KHSV.)
Las Vegas	Nevada	KVCW	2000	The CW; MyNetworkTV	
Reno	Nevada	KRNV-DT		Roar	
Reno	Nevada	KRXI-TV	2013	Fox; NBC	
Reno	Nevada	KNSN-TV	2013	Independent/MyNetworkTV	
Albany	New York	WRGB	2012	CBS	
Albany	New York	WCWN	2012	The CW	
Buffalo	New York	WUTV	1996	Fox	
Buffalo	New York	WNYO-TV	2001	MyNetworkTV	
Rochester	New York	WHAM-TV	2013	ABC; The CW	
Rochester	New York	WUHF	1995	Fox	
Syracuse	New York	WSTM-TV	2013	NBC; The CW	
Syracuse	New York	WTVH	2013	Roar	
Syracuse	New York	WKOF	2025	CBS	
Greensboro	North Carolina	WXLV-TV	1996	ABC	
Greensboro	North Carolina	WMYV	2001	MyNetworkTV	
New Bern	North Carolina	WYDO	2017	Roar	
New Bern	North Carolina	WCTI-TV	2017	ABC; Fox	
Raleigh–Durham	North Carolina	WLFL	1994	The CW	
Raleigh–Durham	North Carolina	WRDC	1995	MyNetworkTV	
Cincinnati	Ohio	WKRC-TV	2012	CBS; The CW	
Cincinnati	Ohio	WSTR-TV	1995	MyNetworkTV	
Columbus	Ohio	WSYX	1997	ABC; MyNetworkTV/The Nest; Fox	
Columbus	Ohio	WTTE **	1986	Roar	
Columbus	Ohio	WWHO	2011	The CW	(Note: Owned by Manhan Media.)
Dayton	Ohio	WKEF	1998	ABC; Fox; MyNetworkTV/Nest	
Dayton	Ohio	WRGT-TV	2001	Roar	
Toledo	Ohio	WNWO-TV	2013	NBC	
Oklahoma City	Oklahoma	KOKH-TV	2003	Fox	
Oklahoma City	Oklahoma	KOCB	1996	Independent	
Tulsa	Oklahoma	KTUL	2014	ABC; Fox	
Tulsa	Oklahoma	KOKI-TV	2026	Roar	
Tulsa	Oklahoma	KMYT-TV	2026	MyNetworkTV	
Eugene	Oregon	KVAL-TV	2013	CBS	
Eugene	Oregon	KCBY-TV	2013	CBS	(Note: Satellite of KVAL-TV.)
Eugene	Oregon	KPIC	2013	CBS	(Note: Owned by South West Oregon TV Broadcasting Corporation, jointly controlled by Sinclair and California Oregon Broadcasting, Inc.)
Eugene	Oregon	KMTR		NBC; CW+	
Eugene	Oregon	KMCB		NBC; CW+	(Note: Satellite of KMTR.)
Eugene	Oregon	KTCW		NBC; CW+	
Medford	Oregon	KTVL	2012	CBS; CW+	
Portland	Oregon	KATU	2013	ABC	
Portland	Oregon	KUNP	2013	Independent	
Harrisburg	Pennsylvania	WHP-TV	2012	CBS; MyNetworkTV; The CW	
Johnstown	Pennsylvania	WJAC-TV	2013	NBC; CW+	
Johnstown	Pennsylvania	WWCP-TV	2016	Fox; ABC	
Johnstown	Pennsylvania	WATM-TV	2016	ABC; Fox	(Note: Owned by Palm Television and operated by Cunningham Broadcasting and Sinclair.)
Pittsburgh	Pennsylvania	WPGH-TV	1991	Fox	
Pittsburgh	Pennsylvania	WPNT **	1978	The CW / MyNetworkTV	(Note: Owned by Sinclair from 1978 to 1991; reacquired in 2000.)
Scranton	Pennsylvania	WOLF-TV	2014	Fox; The CW; MyNetworkTV	
Scranton	Pennsylvania	WQMY	2014	MyNetworkTV; Fox; The CW	
Scranton	Pennsylvania	WSWB	2014	The CW	
Providence	Rhode Island	WJAR	2014	NBC; ABC	
Providence	Rhode Island	WLNE-TV	2025	Roar	
Charleston	South Carolina	WCIV	1998	MyNetworkTV; ABC	
Charleston	South Carolina	WTAT-TV	1995	Fox	
Columbia	South Carolina	WACH	2013	Fox	
Greenville	South Carolina	WLOS	1997	ABC; MyNetworkTV	
Greenville	South Carolina	WMYA-TV	1997	Roar	
Myrtle Beach	South Carolina	WPDE-TV	2013	ABC; The CW	
Myrtle Beach	South Carolina	WWMB	2013	Roar	
Chattanooga	Tennessee	WTVC	2012	ABC; Fox	
Chattanooga	Tennessee	WFLI-TV	2015	The CW; MyNetworkTV	
Johnson City	Tennessee	WCYB-TV	2017	NBC; The CW; Fox	
Johnson City	Tennessee	WEMT	2017	Roar	(Note: Owned by Sinclair from 1998 to 2006; acquired by Cunningham in 2017.)
Nashville	Tennessee	WZTV	1994	Fox; The CW	
Nashville	Tennessee	WUXP-TV	2000	MyNetworkTV	
Nashville	Tennessee	WNAB	2002	Roar	(Note: Owned by Tennessee Broadcasting.)
Abilene	Texas	KTXS-TV	2017	ABC; CW+	
Abilene	Texas	KTES-LD	2017	Roar	
Amarillo	Texas	KVII-TV	2013	ABC; CW+	
Amarillo	Texas	KVIH-TV	2013	ABC; CW+	(Note: Satellite of KVII-TV.)
Austin	Texas	KEYE-TV	2012	CBS; Telemundo	
Beaumont–Port Arthur	Texas	KBTV-TV	2012	Roar	
Beaumont–Port Arthur	Texas	KFDM	2012	CBS; CW+; Fox	
Corpus Christi	Texas	KSCC	2016	Fox; CW+	
El Paso	Texas	KDBC-TV	2013	CBS; MyNetworkTV/Roar	
El Paso	Texas	KFOX-TV	2013	Fox	
San Angelo	Texas	KTXE-LD	2017	ABC; CW+	(Note: Satellite of KTXS.)
San Antonio	Texas	KMYS	2001	Roar	
San Antonio	Texas	WOAI-TV	2012	NBC; The CW	
San Antonio	Texas	KABB	1997	Fox	
Salt Lake City	Utah	KUTV	2012	CBS; MyNetworkTV	
Salt Lake City	Utah	KJZZ-TV	2016	Independent	
St. George	Utah	KMYU	2012	MyNetworkTV; CBS	
Lynchburg–Roanoke	Virginia	WSET-TV	2014	ABC	
Norfolk	Virginia	WTVZ-TV	1996	MyNetworkTV	
Richmond	Virginia	WRLH-TV	1998	Fox; MyNetworkTV/Roar	
Seattle	Washington	KOMO-TV	2013	ABC	
Seattle	Washington	KUNS-TV	2013	The CW	
Yakima	Washington	KIMA-TV	2013	CBS; CW+	
Yakima	Washington	KEPR-TV	2013	CBS; CW+	
Yakima	Washington	KUNW-CD	2013	Univision	
Yakima	Washington	KVVK-CD	2013	Univision	(Note: Satellite of KUNW-CD.)
Yakima	Washington	KORX-CD	2013	Univision	
Huntington–Charleston	West Virginia	WCHS-TV	1997	ABC; Fox	
Huntington–Charleston	West Virginia	WVAH-TV	1994	Catchy Comedy	
Wheeling	West Virginia	WTOV-TV	2013	NBC; Fox	
Green Bay	Wisconsin	WLUK-TV	2014	Fox	
Green Bay	Wisconsin	WCWF	2014	The CW	
Madison	Wisconsin	WMSN-TV	2002	Fox	

== Former stations ==
TV stations formerly owned by Sinclair Broadcast Group
Media market	State/Dist.	Station	Purchased	Sold	Notes
Anniston	Alabama	WJSU-TV	2014	2015	(Note: Former satellite of WBMA-LD.) (Note: Sold as part of Sinclair's acquisition of Allbritton Communications.)
Tuscaloosa	Alabama	WCFT-TV	2014	2015	
Los Angeles	California	KBLA	1996	1998	
Sacramento	California	KOVR	1997	2005	
Colorado Springs	Colorado	KXRM-TV	2013	2014	
Colorado Springs	Colorado	KXTU-LD	2013	2014	
St. Petersburg–Tampa	Florida	WTTA	1991	2014	
Tallahassee	Florida	WTXL-TV	2001	2006	
Idaho Falls–Pocatello	Idaho	KIDK	2013	2013	
Idaho Falls–Pocatello	Idaho	KXPI-LD	2013	2013	
Champaign–Springfield	Illinois	WICS	1998	2025	
Champaign–Springfield	Illinois	WICD (Note: Semi-satellite of WICS.)	1998	2025	
Champaign–Springfield	Illinois	WRSP-TV			
Champaign–Springfield	Illinois	WCCU			
Champaign–Springfield	Illinois	WBUI			
Quincy	Illinois	KHQA-TV	2013	2025	
Indianapolis	Indiana	WIIB **	1988	1997	
Indianapolis	Indiana	WTTV	1997	2002	
Kokomo	Indiana	WTTK	1997	2002	(Note: Satellite of WTTV.)
Ottumwa	Iowa	KTVO	2013	2025	
Lexington	Kentucky	WDKY-TV	1996	2020	
New Orleans	Louisiana	KMEZ	1996	1998	
New Orleans	Louisiana	WBYU	1997	1998	
New Orleans	Louisiana	WEZB	1998	1999	
New Orleans	Louisiana	WLMG	1996	1999	
New Orleans	Louisiana	WLTS-FM	1997	1999	(Note: Owned by Phase II Broadcasting.)
New Orleans	Louisiana	WRNO-FM	1997	1998	
New Orleans	Louisiana	WSMB	1996	1999	
New Orleans	Louisiana	WTKL	1997	1999	
New Orleans	Louisiana	WWL	1996	1999	
Springfield	Massachusetts	WGGB-TV	1998	2007	
Lansing	Michigan	WLAJ	2012	2013	
Marquette	Michigan	WLUC-TV	2013	2016	
Kansas City	Missouri	KCFX	1997	1999	
Kansas City	Missouri	KCIY	1997	1999	
Kansas City	Missouri	KQRC-FM	1997	1999	
Kansas City	Missouri	KSMO-TV	1996	2005	
Kansas City	Missouri	KUPN	1997	1999	(Note: Known as KCAZ prior to 1998.)
Kansas City	Missouri	KXTR	1997	1999	
St. Louis	Missouri	KIHT	1997	2000	
St. Louis	Missouri	KPNT	1997	2000	
St. Louis	Missouri	KXOK-FM	1998	2000	
St. Louis	Missouri	WIL-FM	1997	2000	
St. Louis	Missouri	WRTH	1997	2000	
St. Louis	Missouri	WVRV	1997	2000	
Buffalo	New York	WBEN	1996	1999	
Buffalo	New York	WGR	1996	1999	
Buffalo	New York	WKSE	1996	1999	
Buffalo	New York	WMJQ	1996	1999	
Buffalo	New York	WWWS	1996	1999	
Buffalo	New York	WWKB	1996	1999	
Rochester	New York	WBBF	1997	1998	
Rochester	New York	WBEE-FM	1997	1998	
Rochester	New York	WKLX	1997	1998	
Rochester	New York	WQRV	1997	1998	
Syracuse	New York	WNYS-TV	(Note: Owned by RKM Media, Inc.)		
Syracuse	New York	WSTQ-LP	2013	2021	
Syracuse	New York	WSYT	1998	2013	
Greensboro	North Carolina	WEAL	1998	1999	
Greensboro	North Carolina	WJMH	1998	1999	
Greensboro	North Carolina	WMQX-FM	1998	1999	
Greensboro	North Carolina	WQMG-FM	1998	1999	
Portland	Oregon	KKRH	1997	1998	
Portland	Oregon	KKSN	1997	1998	
Portland	Oregon	KKSN-FM	1997	1998	
Harrisburg	Pennsylvania	WHTM-TV	2014	2014	(Note: Temporarily owned by Sinclair under a "hold separate agreement".)
Harrisburg	Pennsylvania	WLYH-TV	(Note: Owned by Nexstar Media Group.)		
Scranton	Pennsylvania	WGBI	1996	1999	(Note: Simulcast of WILK.)
Scranton	Pennsylvania	WGGI	1998	1999	
Scranton	Pennsylvania	WGGY	1996	1999	
Scranton	Pennsylvania	WILK	1996	1999	
Scranton	Pennsylvania	WILP	1996	1999	
Scranton	Pennsylvania	WILT	1996	1999	(Note: Owned by Mount Pocono Broadcasting)
Scranton	Pennsylvania	WKRF	1997	1999	(Note: Simulcast of WKRZ.)
Scranton	Pennsylvania	WKRZ	1996	1999	
Scranton	Pennsylvania	WSHG	1997	1999 (Note: Owned by Futuremark Communications.)	(Note: Known as WWSH prior to 1998 and WILK-FM in 1998.)
Scranton	Pennsylvania	WWFH	1997	1999	(Note: Known as WILP-FM in 1998.)
Providence	Rhode Island	WLWC	2012	2013	
Charleston	South Carolina	WCIV	2014	2015	
Greenville (Note: All Greenville, South Carolina, stations owned by Keymarket Broadcasting of South Carolina until 1998. Operated by Sinclair from 1996 to 1998 under an inherited local marketing agreement.)	South Carolina	WFBC-FM	1996	1999	
Greenville	South Carolina	WOLI	1996	1999	
Greenville	South Carolina	WOLT	1996	1999	
Greenville	South Carolina	WORD	1996	1999	
Greenville	South Carolina	WSPA	1996	1999	
Greenville	South Carolina	WSPA-FM	1996	1999	
Greenville	South Carolina	WYRD	1996	1999	(Note: Known as WFBC prior to 1997.)
Memphis	Tennessee	WJCE	1996	1999	
Memphis	Tennessee	WOGY-FM	1996	1999	
Memphis	Tennessee	WRVR	1996	1999	
Nashville	Tennessee	WJCE-FM	1996	1997	
Nashville	Tennessee	WLAC	1996	1997	
Nashville	Tennessee	WLAC-FM	1996	1997	
Corpus Christi	Texas	KXPX-LP	2016	2018	
Corpus Christi	Texas	KTOV-LP	2016	2018	
Harlingen	Texas	KGBT-TV	2013	2021	
Tyler	Texas	KETK-TV	1998	2004 (Note: Non-license assets were purchased by Communications Corporation of America in 1999; license sold to ComCorp in 2004.)	
Burlington	Vermont	WPTZ	1997	1998	
Burlington	Vermont	WFFF-TV	(Note: Operated by Heritage Media.)		
Hartford	Vermont	WNNE (Note: Semi-satellite of WPTZ.)	1997	1998	
Norfolk	Virginia	WGH	1997	1998	
Norfolk	Virginia	WGH-FM	1997	1998	
Norfolk	Virginia	WNVZ	1998	1999	
Norfolk	Virginia	WPTE	1998	1999	
Norfolk	Virginia	WVKL	1997	1999	
Norfolk	Virginia	WWDE-FM	1998	1999	
Seattle	Washington	KOMO	2013	2021	
Seattle	Washington	KOMO-FM	2013	2021	(Note: Owned by South Sound Broadcasting until 2020.)
Seattle	Washington	KPLZ-FM	2013	2021	
Seattle	Washington	KVI	2013	2021	
Milwaukee	Wisconsin	WCGV-TV	1995	2018	(Note: Operated as full-power station WCGV-TV until 2018.)
Milwaukee	Wisconsin	WEMP	1997	1999	
Milwaukee	Wisconsin	WMYX-FM	1997	1999	
Milwaukee	Wisconsin	WVTV	2000	2025	
Milwaukee	Wisconsin	WXSS	1997	1999	
