= Bonten Media Group =

American television broadcast company

Bonten Media Group, LLC
- Company type: Private; Limited liability company
- Industry: Broadcast Television
- Predecessor: 14 stations from Bluestone Television
- Founded: November 2006
- Founders: Randall D. Bongarten; Diamond Castle Holdings
- Defunct: September 1, 2017; 8 years ago
- Fate: Acquired by Sinclair
- Successor: Sinclair Broadcast Group
- Headquarters: Empire State Building, New York, New York, USA
- Parent: Diamond Castle Holdings

Bonten Media Group was a New York City-based owner of television broadcast stations in the United States. It was formed by Randall D. Bongarten and Diamond Castle Holdings in November 2006. Its first acquisition was 14 stations from Bluestone Television, founded by Sandy DiPasquale and Providence Equity Partners (who would later form Newport Television) on May 31, 2007. Bluestone had acquired the same stations from Lamco Communications in 2004. On January 1, 2008, Bonten entered into an agreement with Esteem Broadcasting to provide services to the Fox affiliates (WFXI/WYDO) in the Greenville-New Bern market, in addition to WEMT in the Tri-Cities area of Northeastern Tennessee and Southwestern Virginia, bringing the number of stations which Bonten Media Group owns or provides services up to 16 from 13.

On April 21, 2017, Sinclair Broadcast Group announced its intent to purchase the Bonten stations for $240 million. The deal came immediately following the re-instatement of the "UHF discount", which reduces the calculated "reach" of a station for the purposes of national ownership limits if it broadcasts on a UHF channel. The sale was approved on June 30, and the sale was completed on September 1.

== Former stations ==
- Stations are arranged in alphabetical order by state and city of license.

Stations owned by Bonten Media Group
Media market	State	Station	Purchased	Sold	Notes
Chico–Redding	California	KCVU	2012	2017	(Note: Owned by a third party and operated by Bonten.)
Chico–Redding	California	KKTF-LD	2012	2017	
Chico–Redding	California	KRCR-TV	2007	2017	
Chico–Redding	California	KRVU-LD	2012	2017	
Chico–Redding	California	KUCO-LP	2012	2017	
Chico–Redding	California	KXVU-LP	2012	2017	
Chico–Redding	California	KZVU-LD	2012	2017	(Note: Satellite of KRVU-LD.)
Eureka	California	KAEF-TV	2007	2017	(Note: Semi-satellite of KRCR-TV.)
Eureka	California	KBVU	2012	2017	(Note: Semi-satellite of KCVU.)
Eureka	California	KECA-LD	2012	2017	
Eureka	California	KEUV-LP	2012	2017	
Bozeman	Montana	KDBZ-CD	2007	2017	(Note: Satellite of KTVM-TV.)
Butte	Montana	KTVM-TV	2007	2017	(Note: Semi-satellite of KECI-TV.)
Kalispell	Montana	KCFW-TV	2007	2017	
Missoula	Montana	KECI-TV	2007	2017	
Greenville–New Bern	North Carolina	WCTI-TV	2007	2017	
Greenville–New Bern	North Carolina	WFXI	2007	2017	
Greenville–New Bern	North Carolina	WYDO	2007	2017	(Note: Satellite of WFXI.)
Tri-Cities	Tennessee	WCYB-TV	2007	2017	
Tri-Cities	Tennessee	WEMT	2007	2017	
Abilene	Texas	KTES-LD	2007	2017	
Abilene	Texas	KTXS-TV	2007	2017	
San Angelo	Texas	KTXE-LD	2007	2017	(Note: Satellite of KTXS.)

== See also ==
- Sainte Partners II, L.P.
