= List of UPN affiliates =

This is a list of stations that were affiliated with UPN in the United States at the time of network closure on September 15, 2006.

City of license / Market	Station	Channel	Ownership
New York, NY	WWOR-TV	9	Fox Television Stations
Los Angeles, CA	KCOP	13	Fox Television Stations
Chicago, IL	WPWR-TV	50	Fox Television Stations
Philadelphia, PA	WPSG	57	CBS Corporation
San Francisco–San Jose–Oakland, CA	KBHK-TV	44	CBS Corporation
Dallas–Ft. Worth, TX	KTXA	21	CBS Corporation
Boston, MA	WSBK-TV	38	CBS Corporation
Washington, DC	WDCA	20	Fox Television Stations
Atlanta, GA	WUPA	69	CBS Corporation
Houston, TX	KTXH	20	Fox Television Stations
Detroit, MI	WKBD-TV	50	CBS Corporation
Tampa–St. Petersburg, FL	WTOG	44	CBS Corporation
Phoenix, AZ	KUTP	45	Fox Television Stations
Seattle–Tacoma, WA	KSTW-TV	11	CBS Corporation
Minneapolis–St. Paul, MN	WFTC	29	Fox Television Stations
Miami, FL	WBFS-TV	33	CBS Corporation
Cleveland–Akron, OH	WUAB-TV	43	Raycom Media
Denver, CO	KTVD	20	Gannett Company
Orlando, FL	WRBW-TV	65	Fox Television Stations
Sacramento, CA	KMAX-TV	31	CBS Corporation
St. Louis, MO	WRBU-TV	46	Roberts Broadcasting
Pittsburgh, PA	WNPA	19	CBS Corporation
Portland, OR	KPDX-TV	49	Meredith Corporation
Baltimore, MD	WUTB-TV	24	Fox Television Stations
Indianapolis, IN	WNDY-TV	23	LIN Broadcasting
Charlotte	WJZY-TV	46	Capitol Broadcasting Company
San Diego	XHDTV-TV	49	Entravision Communications
Hartford	WCTX-TV	59	LIN Broadcasting
Raleigh–Durham	WRDC-TV	28	Sinclair Broadcast Group
Nashville	WUXP-TV	30	Sinclair Broadcast Group
Kansas City	KCWE-TV	29	Hearst-Argyle Television
Columbus, Ohio	WWHO	53	LIN Broadcasting
Cincinnati	WBQC-LD	38	Block Communications
Milwaukee	WCGV-TV	24	Sinclair Broadcast Group
Salt Lake City	KPNZ	24	Utah Communications, LLC
Greenville, South Carolina	WASV	62	Media General
San Antonio	KBEJ	2	Belo Corporation
West Palm Beach, Florida	WTVX-TV	34	CBS Corporation
Grand Rapids–Kalamazoo	WXSP	15	LIN Broadcasting
Birmingham, Alabama	WABM	68	Sinclair Broadcast Group
Harrisburg, Pennsylvania	WLYH-TV	15	SJL Broadcasting (Note: Operated by Clear Channel Communications under an LMA.)
Norfolk–Portsmouth–Newport News, VA	WGNT-TV	27	CBS Corporation
Las Vegas	KTUD-CA	25	Greenspun Broadcasting
Memphis	WLMT	30	Clear Channel Communications
Albuquerque–Santa Fe	KASY	50	ACME Communications
Oklahoma City	KAUT-TV	43	New York Times
Greensboro, North Carolina	WUPN	48	Sinclair Broadcast Group
Louisville, Kentucky	WMYO	58	Independence Television Company of Kentucky
Buffalo	WNLO	23	LIN Broadcasting
Jacksonville, Florida	WAWS (Note: Primary Fox affiliate, secondary UPN affiliate.)	30	Clear Channel Communications
Providence, Rhode Island	WLWC-TV	28	CBS Corporation
Austin, Texas	KCWX	2	Belo Corporation
Wilkes Barre–Scranton, Pennsylvania	WSWB	38	Pegasus Communications
New Orleans	WUPL	54	CBS Corporation
Fresno, California	KAIL	53	TransAmerica Broadcasting
Albany, NY–Pittsfield, MA	WNYA	51	Venture Technologies Group
Albany, NY–Pittsfield, MA	WNYA-CA	15	Venture Technologies Group
Little Rock, Arkansas	KASN	38	Clear Channel Communications
Dayton, Ohio	MVC	N/A	Cox Media Group
Mobile, Alabama–Pensacola, Florida	WJTC	44	Clear Channel Communications
Knoxville, Tennessee	WVLT-DT	8.2	Gray Television
Richmond, Virginia	WUPV	65	Lockwood Broadcasting
Tulsa, OK	KTFO	41	Clear Channel Communications
Lexington, KY	WKYT-DT	27	Gray Television
Lexington, KY	WBLU-LP	62	B&C Communications
Fort Myers–Naples, FL	WEVU-CA	4	Caloosa Television Corporation
Fort Myers–Naples, FL	WBSP-CA	7	Caloosa Television Corporation
Charleston–Huntington, WV	WQCW	30	Television Properties, Inc.
Flint–Saginaw–Bay City, MI	WNEM-TV	5	Meredith Corporation
Wichita, Kansas	KMTW	36	Clear Channel Communications
Roanoke-Lynchburg, Virginia	WDRL	24	Melvin Eleazer
Green Bay, Wisconsin	WACY	32	ACE TV/Journal Broadcast Group
Tucson, Arizona	KTTU-TV	18	A.H. Belo
Toledo, Ohio	WNGT-LP	48	L & M Video Productions
Honolulu	KIKU	20	KHLS, Inc.
Des Moines, Iowa	WHO-TV (Note: Primary NBC affiliate, secondary UPN affiliate.)	13	New York Times
Portland, Maine	WPME	35	Pegasus Broadcast Television
Omaha, Nebraska	WOWT-DT	6.2	Gray Television
Springfield, Missouri	K15CZ	15	Schurz Communications
Spokane, Washington	KXLY (Note: Primary ABC affiliate, secondary UPN affiliate.)	4	Morgan Murphy Stations
Rochester, New York	WBGT-CA	40	WBGT, LLC
Syracuse, New York	WSTQ-LP	14	Barrington Broadcasting
Paducah, Kentucky	WQWQ-CA	9	Raycom Media
Paducah, Kentucky	WQTV-LP	24	Raycom Media
Shreveport, Louisiana	KPXJ	21	KTBS, Inc.
Champaign, Illinois	WCFN	49	Nexstar Broadcasting
Columbia, South Carolina	WZRB	47	Roberts Broadcasting
Huntsville, Alabama	WHDF	15	Lockwood Broadcasting
Madison, Wisconsin	WISC-DT	3	Morgan Murphy Group
Chattanooga, Tennessee	WDEF-TV (Note: Primary CBS affiliate, secondary UPN affiliate.)	12	Media General
Jackson, Mississippi	WRBJ	34	Roberts Broadcasting
South Bend–Elkhart, Indiana	WSBT-DT	22	Schurz Communications
Cedar Rapids–Waterloo, Iowa	KWWF-TV	22	Equity Broadcasting
Burlington, VT–Plattsburgh, NY	WGMU-CA	39	Equity Broadcasting
Harlingen–Brownsville, Texas	—N/a	—N/a	—N/a
Tri-Cities, Tennessee–Virginia	WAPK-CA	36	Holston Valley Broadcasting Corporation
Baton Rouge, Louisiana	WBXH-CA	39	Raycom Media
Colorado Springs, Colorado	KXTU-LD	57	Raycom Media
Waco, Texas	KWTX	10	Gray Television
Waco, Texas	KBTX-DT	3	Gray Television
Davenport, IA–Rock Island–Moline, IL	WBQD-LP	26	Venture Technologies Group
Savannah, Georgia	WGSA	34	Southern TV Corporation
Johnstown–Altoona, Pennsylvania	WWCP	8	Peak Media of Pennsylvania
El Paso, Texas	—N/a	—N/a	—N/a
Charleston, South Carolina	WMMP	36	Sinclair Broadcast Group
Evansville, Indiana	WTSN-LP	58	Communications Corporation of America
Fort Smith, Arkansas	KFDF-CA	10	Equity Broadcasting
Youngstown, Ohio	—N/a	—N/a	—N/a
Lincoln–Hastings–Kearney, Nebraska	KOLN-DT		Gray Television
Myrtle Beach, South Carolina	WWMB	21	SagamoreHill Broadcasting (Note: Operated by Barrington Broadcasting via an LMA.)
Ft. Wayne, Indiana	WANE-TV	15	LIN Broadcasting
Greenville–New Bern–Washington, NC	WCTI-DT	12.3	Lamco Communications
Tallahassee, Florida	WCTV-DT	6.2	Gray Television
Springfield–Holyoke, MA	WCTX	59	LIN Broadcasting
Reno, Nevada	KAME-TV	21	Cox Media Group
Tyler–Longview, Texas	KYTX-DT	19	Max Media
Lansing, Michigan	WHTV	18	Venture Technologies Group
Traverse City–Cadillac, Michigan	WFQX-TV	33	Rockfleet Broadcasting
Traverse City–Cadillac, Michigan	WFUP	45	Rockfleet Broadcasting
Augusta, Georgia	WRDW-DT	12.2	Gray Television
Sioux Falls, South Dakota	KELO-DT	11.2	Young Broadcasting
Peoria, Illinois	WHOI	19	Sinclair Broadcast Group
Peoria, Illinois	WAOE	59	Venture Technologies Group
Montgomery, Alabama	WRJM-TV	67	Register Communications
Boise, Idaho	KNIN-TV	9	Banks Broadcasting
Fargo–Grand Forks, ND	KCPM	27	Central Plains Media
Eugene, OR	KTVC	36	Equity Broadcasting
Macon, GA	WGNM	64	Christian Television Network
Santa Barbara, CA	—N/a	—N/a	—N/a
Lafayette, LA	KLAF-LP	50	Communications Corporation of America
Monterey–Salinas, CA	—N/a	—N/a	—N/a
Yakima, WA	—N/a	—N/a	—N/a
Bakersfield, CA	KUVI	45	Univision Communications
La Crosse–Eau Claire, WI	WKBT-DT	8.2	Morgan Murphy Stations
Columbus, GA	WLGA	66	Pappas Telecasting
Corpus Christi, TX	KTOV-LP	21	GH Broadcasting
Chico–Redding, CA	KRVU-LD	21	Sainte Partners II, L.P.
Chico–Redding, CA	KZVU-LP	21	Sainte Partners II, L.P.
Amarillo, TX	KFDA-DT	10.2	Drewry Communications Group
Amarillo, TX	KCPN-LP	33	Wicks Broadcast Group
Columbus–Tupelo–West Point, MS	WCBI-DT	4.2	Morris Multimedia
Rockford, IL	WTVO-DT	17.2	Mission Broadcasting
Wausau–Rhinelander, WI	—N/a	—N/a	—N/a
Monroe, LA–El Dorado, AR	KEJB	43	KM Television
Wilmington, NC	WILM-LP	10	Capitol Broadcasting Company
Duluth, MN–Superior, WI	KBJR-DT	6.2	Granite Broadcasting
Ashland, WI	WAST-LP	9	True North TV 25, LLC
Topeka, KS	KTMJ-CA	43	Montgomery Communications
Columbia–Jefferson City, MO	KZOU-LP	11	JW Broadcasting
Beaumont–Port Arthur, TX	KFDM	6	
Medford–Klamath Falls, OR	KFBI-LP	48	Sainte Partners II, L.P.
Erie, PA	WSEE-DT	35.2	Lilly Broadcasting of Pennsylvania
Sioux City, IA	KMEG	14	
Joplin, MO–Pittsburg, KS	—N/a	—N/a	—N/a
Albany, GA	WSWG	44	Gray Television
Wichita Falls, TX–Lawton, OK	KJBO	35	Wicks Communication
Lubbock, TX	KUPT	14	Ramar Communications
Salisbury, MD	WBOC-DT	16.2	Draper Holdings Business Trust
Palm Springs, CA	KPSE-LP	50	Mirage Media
Bluefield–Beckley–Oak Hill, WV	—N/a	—N/a	—N/a
Terre Haute, IN	WTHI	10	
Bangor, ME	—N/a	—N/a	—N/a
Rochester–Austin, MN–Mason City, IA	KIMT	3	Media General
Anchorage, AK	KYES	5	Fireweed Communications Corporation
Wheeling, WV–Steubenville, OH	WVTX-CA	28	Turnpike Television
Panama City, FL	WBIF	51	Equity Broadcasting
Panama City, FL	WPCT	46	Beach TV Properties
Binghamton, NY	WBPN-LP	10	Stainless Broadcasting
Bismarck–Minot, ND	KNDX	26	Prime Cities Broadcasting
Bismarck–Minot, ND	KXND	24	Prime Cities Broadcasting
Odessa–Midland, TX	KOSA-TV		ICA Broadcasting
Biloxi, MS	WXXV	25	Morris Multimedia
Sherman, TX	KXII-DT	12.2	Gray Television
Gainesville, FL	WYPN-CA	45	Pegasus Communications
Idaho Falls–Pocatello, ID	KUNP-LP	24	
Abilene–Sweetwater, TX	KIDZ-LP	42	Sage Broadcasting
Hattiesburg, MS	WXXV	25	Morris Multimedia
Clarksburg–Weston, WV	WDTV-DT	5.2	Withers Broadcasting
Yuma, AZ–El Centro, CA	KECY-TV	9	Pacific Media Corporation
Missoula, MT	KMMF		Equity Broadcasting
Utica, NY	WPNY-LP	11/53	Nexstar Broadcasting
Billings, MT	KHMT (Note: Primary ABC affiliate, secondary Fox and UPN affiliate.)	4	Nexstar Broadcasting
Billings, MT	KSVI	6	Nexstar Broadcasting
Quincy, IL–Hannibal, MO	KHQA	7	Barrington Broadcasting
Dothan, AL	WTVY-DT	4.2	Gray Television
Elmira–Hornell, NY	WTTX-LP	30	Clear Channel Communications
Jackson, TN	WJKT	16	Clear Channel Communications
Lake Charles, LA	KVHP	29	National Communications
Watertown, NY	WNYF-CA	28	United Communications
Watertown, NY	WNYF-LP	28	United Communications
Rapid City, SD	KCPL-LP	52	Central Plains Media
Marquette, MI	WMQF	19	Equity Broadcasting
Alexandria, LA	KWCE-LP	36	
Jonesboro, AR	—N/a	—N/a	—N/a
Harrisonburg, VA	—N/a	—N/a	—N/a
Charlottesville, VA	—N/a	—N/a	—N/a
Bowling Green, KY	—N/a	—N/a	—N/a
Greenwood–Greenville, MS	WXVT	15	Saga Communications
Meridian, MS	WMDN	24	
Grand Junction–Montrose, CO	KGJT-LP	27	Hoak Media Corporation
Laredo, TX	—N/a	—N/a	—N/a
Lafayette, IN	—N/a	—N/a	—N/a
Parkersburg, WV–Marietta, OH	WTAP		Gray Television
Great Falls, MT	KLMN	26	Equity Broadcasting
Twin Falls, ID	KIDA	5	Turner Enterprises
Butte–Bozeman, MT	KXLF-TV	4	Cordillera Communications
Butte–Bozeman, MT	KBZK	7	Cordillera Communications
Eureka, CA	KUVU-LP	33	Raul Broadcasting (Sainte Partners II, L.P.)
Bend, OR	KUBN-LP	50	Meredith Corporation
Lima, OH	WLQP-LP	18	Metro Video Productions
San Angelo, TX	KIDY	6	Sage Broadcasting Corporation
Casper, WY	K26ES	26	Wyomedia Corporation
Ottumwa, IA–Kirksville, MO	KYOU-TV	15	Ottumwa Media Holdings, LLC
Mankato, MN	KEYC-TV	12	United Communications
St. Joseph, MO	—N/a	—N/a	—N/a
Fairbanks, AK	KFXF	7	Tanana Valley Broadcasting Company
Zanesville, OH	—N/a	—N/a	—N/a
Presque Isle, ME	WAGM	8	NESPK, Inc.
Victoria, TX	KVHM-LP	31	Saga Communications
Helena, MT	—N/a	—N/a	—N/a
Juneau, AK	KATH-LP	5	North Star Television Network
Alpena, MI	—N/a	—N/a	—N/a
North Platte, NE	K11TW	11	Hoak Media Corporation
Glendive, MT	KXGN-TV (Note: Primary CBS affiliate, secondary NBC and UPN affiliate.)	5	Glendive Broadcasting Corporation
Virgin Islands	WCVI-TV	39	Virgin Blue
Puerto Rico	WSJP-LP	30	LKK Group
