= KUCO-LD =

Television station in Chico, California

KUCO-LD and K19NH-D
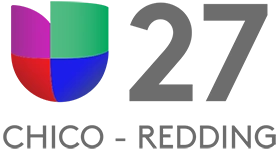

KUCO-LD: Chico, California; K19NH-D: Redding, California; United States
- Channels for KUCO-LD: Digital: 27 (UHF); Virtual: 27
- Channels for K19NH-D: Digital: 15 (UHF); Virtual: 27
- Branding: Univision 27

Programming
- Affiliations: 27.1: Univision; 27.2: UniMás; for others, see § Subchannels

Ownership
- Owner: Sinclair Broadcast Group; (Sinclair-California Licensee, LLC)
- Sister stations: KRCR-TV, KCVU, KXVU-LD, KRVU-LD/KZVU-LD, KKTF-LD

History
- First air date: KUCO-LD: May 21, 2002
- Former call signs: KUCO-LD: K27HC (2002–2003); KUCO-LP (2003–2019); K19NH-D: K46HI(-D) (2003–2023); K15KO-D (2023–2024)
- Former channel number: KUCO-LD: Analog: 27 (UHF, 2002–2019); K19NH-D: Analog: 46 (UHF, 2003–2016); Digital: 46 (UHF, 2016–2023)
- Call sign meaning: KUCO-LD: Univision Chico

Technical information
- Licensing authority: FCC
- Facility ID: KUCO-LD: 127046; K19NH-D: 129800
- Class: KUCO-LD: LD; K19NH-D: LD
- ERP: KUCO-LD: 15 kW; K19NH-D: 5 kW
- HAAT: KUCO-LD: 373.6 m (1,226 ft); K19NH-D: 444.3 m (1,458 ft)
- Transmitter coordinates: KUCO-LD: 39°57′45″N 121°42′44″W; K19NH-D: 40°39′15.1″N 122°31′15.7″W
- Translators: KEUV-LD 35 Eureka; KRVU-LD 46.1 Redding

Links
- Public license information: KUCO-LD: LMS

KUCO-LD (channel 27) is a low-power television station licensed to Chico, California, United States, serving the Chico–Redding market as an affiliate of the Spanish-language network Univision. It is owned by Sinclair Broadcast Group alongside ABC/Fox affiliate KRCR-TV (channel 7), KCVU (channel 20), and four other low-power stations: Antenna TV affiliate KXVU-LD (channel 17); MyNetworkTV affiliates KRVU-LD (channel 21) and KZVU-LD (channel 22), and UniMás affiliate KKTF-LD (channel 30). The stations share studios on Auditorium Drive east of downtown Redding and maintain a news bureau and sales office at the former Sainte Television Group facilities on Main Street in downtown Chico. KUCO-LD's transmitter is located along Cohasset Road northeast of Chico.

KEUV-LD (channel 35) in Eureka operates as a semi-satellite of KUCO-LD. As such, it simulcasts all Univision programming as provided through KUCO but airs separate local commercials and legal station identifications. Although KEUV-LD maintains its own studios (shared with KAEF-TV and KBVU) on Sixth Street in downtown Eureka, master control and some internal operations are based at KUCO's facilities.

== History ==
KUCO's logo prior to January 1, 2013

KUCO-LP was founded by country-western singer Chester Smith's broadcast company Sainte Partners II, L.P. and first hit the air in 2002 to help bring Spanish-language television to the growing Spanish-speaking population in Northern California. It was the first Spanish-language station to air in the Chico/Redding market. It would soon be joined by Telemundo affiliate KXVU-LP and UniMás affiliate KKTF-LD, both also founded by Smith's company.

In 2014, six years after Smith's death, his company sold KUCO-LP and the remaining stations to Bonten Media Group, owners of ABC affiliate KRCR-TV in Redding.

In 2016, KUCO-LP conducted an unauthorized test of the Emergency Alert System. However, the message read that the activation was for an Emergency Action Notification. It is unknown if any panic from residents followed.

On April 21, 2017, Sinclair Broadcast Group announced its intent to purchase the Bonten stations (including KUCO-LP) for $240 million. The sale was completed September 1, 2017.

The station changed its call sign to KUCO-LD on April 5, 2019, coincident with receiving its license for digital operations.

== Subchannels ==
The station's signal is multiplexed:

Subchannels of KUCO-LD
Channel	Res.	Short name	Programming
27.1	1080i	KUCO-LD	Univision
27.2	480i	Unimas	UniMás (KKTF-LD) (4:3)
27.3	480i	TBD	Roar
27.4	480i	Rewind	Rewind TV

Simulcast of subchannels of another station

On October 13, 2021, KUCO-LD gained two additional subchannels: TBD (now Roar) moved over from KXVU-LD; and Rewind TV was added.
