= Fox 20 =

Fox 20 may refer to:

== Television stations in the United States ==
=== Current ===
- KFNB in Casper, Wyoming
- KRCR-DT2, a digital channel of KRCR-TV in Redding, California (branded as Fox 20)
- KXFX-CD in Harlingen, Texas
- WCOV-TV in Montgomery, Alabama

=== Former ===
- KCVU in Chico, California (1994–2025)

== Other uses ==
- 20th Century Fox, former name of 20th Century Studios
