= ABC 23 =

ABC 23 may refer to one of the following television stations in the United States:

== Current ==
- KAEF-TV in Arcata/Eureka, California
  - Semi-satellite of KRCR-TV in Redding, CA
- KERO-TV in Bakersfield, California
- KTMF in Missoula, Montana
- WATM-TV in Altoona, Pennsylvania
- WCVI-DT2, a digital channel of WCVI-TV in Christiansted, U.S. Virgin Islands

== Former ==
- WAKR-TV/WAKC-TV (now WVPX-TV) in Akron, Ohio (1953–1996)
