= Fox 28 =

Fox 28 may refer to one of the following television stations in the United States affiliated with the Fox Broadcasting Company:

== Current ==
- KAEF-DT2, a digital subchannel of KAEF-TV in Eureka, California (branded as Fox 28)
- KAYU-TV in Spokane, Washington
- KGAN-DT2, a digital channel of KGAN in Cedar Rapids, Iowa (branded as Fox 28)
- WNYF-CD in Watertown, New York
- WPGX in Panama City, Florida
- WSYX-DT3, a digital channel of WSYX in Columbus, Ohio (branded as Fox 28)
- WTGS in Hardeeville, South Carolina

== Former ==
- KBVU in Eureka, California (1994–2025)
- KFXA in Cedar Rapids, Iowa (1988–1994 and 1995–2021)
- KYLE-TV in Bryan/College Station, Texas (1994–2015)
- WFTS-TV in Tampa/St. Petersburg, Florida (1988–1994)
- WSJV in Elkhart/South Bend, Indiana (1995–2016)
- WTTE in Columbus, Ohio (1986–2021)
