= Fox 8 =

Fox 8 may refer to:

== Television stations ==
=== Current stations in the U.S. ===
- KJUD-DT3, a digital subchannel of KJUD in Juneau, Alaska
- KTUL-DT2, a digital subchannel of KTUL in Tulsa, Oklahoma
- KUMV-DT2, a digital subchannel of KUMV-TV in Williston, North Dakota
- WAGM-DT2, a digital subchannel of WAGM-TV in Presque Isle, Maine
- WCHS-DT2, a digital subchannel of WCHS-TV in Charleston, West Virginia
- WGHP in High Point, North Carolina
- WJW in Cleveland, Ohio
- WLIO-DT2, a digital subchannel of WLIO in Lima, Ohio
- WVUE-DT in New Orleans, Louisiana
- WWCP-TV in Johnstown, Pennsylvania

=== Former stations in the U.S. ===
- WFXI in Morehead City, North Carolina (1989–2017)

=== Stations not in the U.S. ===
- Fox8, a general entertainment channel in Australia owned by Foxtel Management Pty Ltd
- Fox 8 (Dutch TV channel), former name of Dutch television station Veronica TV when it was owned by News Corporation

== Other uses ==
- "Fox 8", a 2013 short story written by George Saunders
