= KXVU-LD =

Television station in Chico, California

- Chico, California; United States
- Channels: Digital: 3 (VHF); Virtual: 17
- Branding: Antenna TV 17.1

Programming
- Affiliations: 17.1: Antenna TV

Ownership
- Owner: Sinclair Broadcast Group; (Sinclair-California Licensee, LLC)
- Sister stations: KRCR-TV, KCVU, KRVU-LD, KUCO-LD

History
- Founded: July 26, 2002
- First air date: March 31, 2006
- Former call signs: K27HD (2002–2005); K17HF (2005); KXVU-LP (2005–2020)
- Former channel number: Analog: 17 (UHF, 2006–2020)
- Former affiliations: Telemundo (2006–2014)
- Call sign meaning: No meaning; the "VU" letters are also used on sister stations KCVU and KRVU-LD/KZVU-LD

Technical information
- Licensing authority: FCC
- Facility ID: 125422
- ERP: 0.1 kW
- HAAT: 374.5 m (1,229 ft)
- Transmitter coordinates: 39°57′42.7″N 121°42′43.1″W

Links
- Public license information: LMS

KXVU-LD (channel 17) is a low-power television station in Chico, California, United States, serving the Chico–Redding market as an affiliate of Antenna TV. It is owned by Sinclair Broadcast Group alongside ABC/Fox affiliate KRCR-TV (channel 7), KCVU (channel 20), and four other low-power stations: MyNetworkTV affiliates KRVU-LD (channel 21) and KZVU-LD (channel 22), Univision affiliate KUCO-LD (channel 27), and UniMás affiliate KKTF-LD (channel 30). The stations share studios on Auditorium Drive east of downtown Redding and maintain a news bureau and sales office at the former Sainte Television Group facilities on Main Street in downtown Chico. KXVU-LD's transmitter is located along Cohasset Road northeast of Chico.

== History ==
The station started broadcasting on March 31, 2006. It was founded by Chester Smith of Sainte Partners II, L.P., joining sister station and Univision affiliate KUCO-LD as the only two Spanish-language stations in the North Valley until they also founded UniMás affiliate KKTF-LD (channel 30). After the sale of Sainte's assets to Bonten Media Group (owners of ABC affiliates KRCR-TV in Redding and KAEF-TV (channel 23) in Eureka) in 2014, the new owners sold the rights of Telemundo to K4 Media Holdings and moved the station from KXVU-LP to KNVN-DT2, which is now operated by Allen Media Broadcasting.

On April 21, 2017, Sinclair announced its intent to purchase the Bonten stations for $240 million. The sale was completed September 1.

== Subchannel ==
Subchannel of KXVU-LD
Channel	Res.	Short name	Programming
17.1	480i	KXVU-LD	Antenna TV (4:3)
