= KSPX-TV =

Television station in Sacramento, California

- Sacramento–Stockton–Modesto, California; United States
- City: Sacramento, California
- Channels: Digital: 21 (UHF); Virtual: 29

Programming
- Affiliations: 29.1: Ion Television; for others, see § Subchannels

Ownership
- Owner: Ion Media; (Ion Television License, LLC)

History
- First air date: August 28, 1990
- Former call signs: KRBJ (February–March 1985); KCMY (1985–1998); KSPX (1998–2009)
- Former channel numbers: Analog: 29 (UHF, 1990–2009); Digital: 48 (UHF, until 2020)
- Former affiliations: Independent (1990–1998)
- Call sign meaning: Sacramento's Pax TV

Technical information
- Licensing authority: FCC
- Facility ID: 52953
- ERP: 1,000 kW
- HAAT: 444.6 m (1,459 ft)
- Transmitter coordinates: 38°14′50″N 121°30′7″W

Links
- Public license information: Public file; LMS
- Website: iontelevision.com

KSPX-TV (channel 29) is a television station in Sacramento, California, United States, airing programming from the Ion Television network. It is owned by the Ion Media subsidiary of the E. W. Scripps Company, and broadcasts from a transmitter located at TransTower in Walnut Grove, California.

The station began broadcasting in 1990 with home shopping programming and aired home shopping and infomercials before the launch of Pax, predecessor to Ion, in 1998.

== History ==
Channel 29 was assigned to Sacramento in February 1982 at the petition of Shamrock Broadcasting, an action the Federal Communications Commission (FCC) affirmed over objections from KRBK-TV on channel 31. The commission designated a total of 12 applications for comparative hearing, including one from Shamrock; Channel 29 Investors, whose investors featured the father of John Garamendi and former KOVR general manager Ramsay G. Elliott; Royce International Broadcasting; Alden Communications Corporation; and Ponce-Nicasio Broadcasting Company.

An FCC administrative law judge selected Ponce-Nicasio Broadcasting from among six bidders in an initial decision released in January 1984. The application consisted of three stockholders. Carmen Briggs, who owned 70 percent, was the wife of former politician and lobbyist John Briggs; Yolanda Nava was a former anchor at Sacramento TV station KXTV and at the time was working at KNBC in Los Angeles; and Mary Ann Alonzo worked for KGO-TV in San Francisco as well as Sacramento's KCRA-TV in the 1970s.

Not much progress was made on the new station in the rest of the 1980s. Ponce-Nicasio Broadcasting settled with competing applicants, paying them a total of $395,000, to end further litigation around the permit. In September 1989, the firm filed for Chapter 11 bankruptcy protection. Filings in the bankruptcy case exposed a rift between the owners as to the programming for the new station. Nava and Alonzo favored an offer made to affiliate with Telemundo, a Spanish-language network. Briggs favored Home Shopping Club and instructed attorneys for Ponce-Nicasio Broadcasting not to review other offers. While an arbitrator ruled the Telemundo-aligned offer was in the company's best interest, a consultant hired by Briggs was granted a temporary restraining order against the move, and the bankruptcy filing froze that litigation. Nava and Alonzo charged through their lawyer that the filing was a "vindictive 'suicide mission'" to block the Telemundo offer. Briggs criticized them, saying their investment in the station in time and money had been minimal.

KCMY began broadcasting August 27, 1990, a day before the construction permit expired, with Home Shopping Club programming from a transmitter site in Diamond Springs. In a 1992 letter to the editor of Broadcasting magazine, Briggs defended the use of Home Shopping Club programming as a necessary income stream: "KCMY put Home Shopping Network programing on the air as the sole means of getting on the air as no one and I mean no one-like banks or leasing companies would lend us any money for a broadcasting venture without a source of repayment via an affiliation agreement. The only source of regular income available was HSN, since ABC, CBS, NBC and Fox affiliations were long gone by our sign-on in 1990 after the CP grant in 1984."

In 1995, KCMY switched from home shopping to the Infomall TV network from Paxson Communications Corporation. It also briefly had a deal with KXTV to supply reruns of the talk show Geraldo and several other programs. Paxson announced a deal to buy KCMY from Ponce-Nicasio Broadcasting in 1996, but Ponce-Nicasio still owned the station. In 2000, the $17.725 million purchase was filed with the FCC.

KCMY became KSPX ahead of the August 31, 1998, launch of the Pax TV network. After changing its name to i: Independent Television in 2005, the network became known as Ion Television in 2007.

Bill Simon, the Republican candidate in the 2002 California gubernatorial election, had previously been an investor in and vice president of Paxson Communications Corporation. In 2001, he hosted a weekly public affairs show on KSPX, Sunday with Simon.

== Technical information ==
=== Subchannels ===
KSPX-TV's transmitter is located at TransTower in Walnut Grove, California. The station's signal is multiplexed:

Subchannels of KSPX-TV
Subchannel	Res.	Short name	Programming
29.1	720p	ION	Ion Television
29.2	480i	CourtTV	Court TV
29.4	480i	Bounce	Bounce TV
29.5	480i	IONPlus	Ion Plus
29.6	480i	BUSTED	Busted
29.8	480i	HSN	HSN
29.9	480i	HSN2	HSN2
33.2	720p	KCSO-HD	Telemundo (KCSO-LD)

Simulcast of subchannels of another station

=== Analog-to-digital conversion ===
KSPX shut down its analog signal, over UHF channel 29, on June 12, 2009, as part of the federally mandated transition from analog to digital television. The station's digital signal remained on its pre-transition UHF channel 48, using virtual channel 29, until it moved to channel 21 in 2020 as a result of the 2016 United States wireless spectrum auction.
