= KCSO-LD =

Television station in Sacramento, California

KCSO-LD and KMUM-CD

Sacramento, California; United States
- Channels for KCSO-LD: Digital: 3 (VHF); Virtual: 33
- Channels for KMUM-CD: Digital: 19 (UHF); Virtual: 33
- Branding: Telemundo 33; Noticias Telemundo California (newscasts)

Programming
- Affiliations: 33.1: Telemundo; for others, see § Subchannels

Ownership
- Owner: Telemundo Station Group; (NBC Telemundo License LLC)

History
- First air date: KCSO-LD: 1999
- Former channel number: KCSO-LD: Analog: 33 (UHF, 1999–2012)
- Former affiliations: KMUM-CD: Más Música TeVe (until 2006); Tr3́s (2006–2014)
- Call sign meaning: KCSO-LD: Chester Smith Owner; KMUM-CD: variations of Más Música TeVe (former affiliation)

Technical information
- Licensing authority: FCC
- Facility ID: KCSO-LD: 18998; KMUM-CD: 18736
- Class: KCSO-LD: LD; KMUM-CD: CD
- ERP: KCSO-LD: 5 kW; KMUM-CD: 15 kW
- HAAT: KCSO-LD: 516.9 m (1,696 ft); KMUM-CD: 103.9 m (341 ft)
- Transmitter coordinates: KCSO-LD: 38°16′18″N 121°30′22″W; KMUM-CD: 38°42′28.1″N 121°28′36.3″W
- Translators: KSPX-TV 33.2; KMAX-TV 31.7

Links
- Public license information: KCSO-LD: LMS
- Website: www.telemundo33.com

KCSO-LD (channel 33) is a low-power television station in Sacramento, California, United States, serving as the local outlet for the Spanish-language network Telemundo. Owned and operated by NBCUniversal's Telemundo Station Group, KCSO-LD maintains studios on Media Place in the Woodlake neighborhood of Sacramento, and its transmitter is located in Walnut Grove, California. The station is also sister to regional sports networks NBC Sports Bay Area and NBC Sports California.

Due to its low-power status, KCSO-LD simulcasts in high definition on Ion Television outlet KSPX-TV (channel 29) on a subchannel displayed as channel 33.2 and in widescreen standard definition on independent station KMAX-TV (channel 31) on subchannel 31.7. KCSO-LD also operates Class A translator station KMUM-CD in Sacramento and also relies on cable and satellite to reach the entire market.

KCSO formerly operated translator KMMW-LD in Stockton; this station ceased operations in March 2025 and its license was returned to the Federal Communications Commission (FCC).

== History ==
KCSO was founded by country-western performer Chester Smith and his company Sainte Partners II, L.P. and first signed on the air in 1999. It was the last station to be owned by his company. On August 8, 2008, Chester Smith died of heart failure at Stanford University Medical Center in Palo Alto, California. The station continued operating under the Sainte banner until it was sold to Serestar Communications Group in 2013. Sainte folded shortly thereafter.

On March 9, 2014, Serestar Communications agreed to purchase both KMUM-CD and KMMW-LD from Viacom for a disclosed amount. The sale of both stations was finalized on September 25, 2014. Prior to the sale, both of the stations dropped the Tr3́s affiliation and switched to Telemundo. After the sale, they became sister stations and translators to KCSO-LD. Also in 2014, KCSO began simulcasting in widescreen standard definition on KSPX-TV's seventh subchannel (displayed as channel 33.2) to reach the entire market due to KCSO's low-power status. The simulcast was discontinued on October 8, 2021.

Serestar agreed to sell KCSO-LD, KMUM-CD, and KMMW-LD to NBCUniversal on November 28, 2018, as part of a $21 million deal. The sale was completed on March 5, 2019. As a result, KCSO-LD became the sixth television station in the Sacramento market (excluding translator stations) to be owned-and-operated by its affiliated network.

In April 2022, CW owned-and-operated station KMAX-TV (channel 31, now an independent station) resumed the widescreen SD simulcast from KSPX-TV on a new subchannel also displayed as channel 33.2.

In March 2025, the simulcast returned to KSPX-TV in high definition on subchannel 33.2. An SD simulcast remains on KMAX-TV, but is now displayed as channel 31.7.

== News operation ==
KCSO launched a local news department (with newscasts branded as Noticiero 33) following its sign-on. The half-hour local evening news program was broadcast every Monday through Friday at 6 p.m. However, it had low ratings and was canceled after five years.

Later, news briefs were aired online (branded as Telemundo 33 Al Día). In late 2014, it started airing morning news briefs called Noticias 33 por la mañana, which aired at 25 and 55 minutes past the hour from 7 to 9 a.m. during Telemundo's Un Nuevo Dia morning news program.

On November 6, 2016, KCSO re-launched a weekday half-hour long newscast at 6 p.m. (initially branding as Noticiero Telemundo 33, later as Noticias Telemundo Sacramento, now as Noticias Telemundo California after the purchase by NBCUniversal), 11 years after its initial newscast was canceled. It directly competes with Univision owned-and-operated KUVS's long-established (and for several years, the Sacramento area's only) Spanish-language newscast.

In 2017, a weeknight 11 p.m. newscast (branded as Noticias Telemundo California) was launched, further competing with KUVS. Noticias Telemundo California is simulcast on Fresno sister station KNSO.

On March 18, 2020, one year after the purchase by NBCUniversal, the station launched 5 and 5:30 p.m. newscasts, and began simulcasting all of their newscasts on KNSO.

== Technical information ==
=== Subchannels ===
The station's signal is multiplexed:

Subchannels of KCSO-LD and KMUM-CD
Subchannel	Res.	Short name	Programming
33.1	1080i	KCSO-LD	Telemundo
33.3	480i	TeleX	TeleXitos
33.5	480i	CRIMES	NBC True CRMZ
33.6	480i	Oxygen	Oxygen

There is no 33.2 on this multiplex, as it is broadcast from KSPX-TV.

On September 3, 2012, MeTV was moved to KCRA 3.2 (replacing the MoreTV format); 33.3 became silent afterward. 33.3 was re-launched on January 21, 2017, broadcasting TeleXitos.

In 2018, KCSO affiliated with Light TV on newly launched subchannel 33.4. On January 15, 2021, Light TV was relaunched as TheGrio. TheGrio was dropped in March 2024 and the channel is currently silent.

In October 2023, Oxygen was added on a new subchannel 33.6.
