= KEUV-LD =

Television station in Eureka, California

Semi-satellite of KUCO-LD, Chico, California
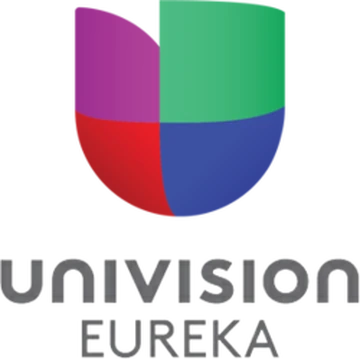
- Eureka, California; United States
- Channels: Digital: 31 (UHF); Virtual: 35
- Branding: Univision Eureka

Programming
- Affiliations: 35.1: Univision

Ownership
- Owner: Sinclair Broadcast Group; (Sinclair-California Licensee, LLC)

History
- Founded: July 20, 1994
- First air date: March 14, 1996
- Former call signs: K31EW (1996–2004); KEUV-LP (2004–2021)
- Former channel numbers: Analog: 31 (UHF, 1996–2020)
- Call sign meaning: Eureka Univision

Technical information
- Licensing authority: FCC
- Facility ID: 31507
- Class: LD
- ERP: 15 kW
- HAAT: 467.6 m (1,534 ft)
- Transmitter coordinates: 40°43′35.1″N 123°58′30.7″W

Links
- Public license information: LMS

KEUV-LD (channel 35) is a low-power television station in Eureka, California, United States, affiliated with the Spanish-language network Univision. It is owned by Sinclair Broadcast Group alongside ABC/Fox affiliate KAEF-TV (channel 23), KBVU (channel 28), and CW+/MyNetworkTV affiliate KECA-LD (channel 29). The four stations share studios on Sixth Street in downtown Eureka; KEUV-LD's transmitter is located along Barry Road southeast of Eureka.

Although identifying as a separate station in its own right, KEUV-LD is considered a semi-satellite of KUCO-LD (channel 27) in Chico. It simulcasts all Univision network programming as provided by its parent but airs different commercials and station identifications. Master control operations are based at the facilities of sister station and ABC affiliate KRCR-TV (channel 7) on Auditorium Drive in Redding.

== History ==
KEUV's logo prior to January 1, 2013

KEUV was founded in 1994 by Sainte Partners II, L.P. It is the first and only Spanish-language television station in Eureka.

On April 21, 2017, Sinclair Broadcast Group purchased KBVU as part of a four-station deal. The sale was completed September 1.

In spring of 2020, KEUV-LP turned off its analog signal and flash cut to digital on channel 31. The station was licensed for digital operation on April 5, 2021, changing its call sign to KEUV-LD.

== Technical information ==
=== Subchannel ===
Subchannel of KEUV-LD
Channel	Res.	Short name	Programming
35.1	1080i	KEUV-LD	Univision

=== Translator ===
- K35LF-D Eureka
