= The Nest (TV network) =

American over-the-air television network

- Type: Digital broadcast television network
- Country: United States
- Broadcast area: Nationwide, via OTA digital TV (coverage 81.85%)
- Affiliates: List of affiliates
- Headquarters: Hunt Valley, Maryland

Programming
- Language: English
- Picture format: 1080p (HDTV master feed); (otherwise 480i SDTV widescreen on subchannel affiliates)

Ownership
- Owner: Sinclair Broadcast Group
- Parent: Sinclair Television Group, Inc.
- Sister channels: Charge!; Comet; ROAR; Tennis Channel

History
- Launched: October 30, 2023; 2 years ago
- Replaced: Stadium (OTA only)

Links
- Webcast: Watch live
- Website: watchthenest.com

The Nest is an American digital broadcast television network owned by the Sinclair Broadcast Group.

== History ==
On October 10, 2023, Sinclair announced that they had plans to launch a new over-the-air television network called The Nest on October 30. Sinclair's distribution of The Nest would replace that of Stadium on TV stations across the U.S. after they sold control of the network to Jerry Reinsdorf's Silver Chalice in May of the same year. At launch, the network was available in more than 50% of U.S. over-the-air television households, including the major markets.

On February 20, 2024, Sinclair announced that Tegna agreed to carry the network to 35 stations across the country.

== Programming ==
The Nest's schedule is made up of reality and true crime content from the libraries of A&E Networks (mostly from the networks A&E and History).

== Affiliates ==
List of The Nest affiliates
| Media market | State/District | Station | Channel |
|---|---|---|---|
| Birmingham | Alabama | WBMA-LD | 58.3 |
| Huntsville–Decatur–Florence | Alabama | WZDX | 54.7 |
| Mobile | Alabama | WPMI-TV | 15.3 |
| Mesa–Phoenix | Arizona | KPNX | 12.5 |
| Tucson | Arizona | KTTU-TV | 18.3 |
| Fort Smith–Fayetteville | Arkansas | KFSM-TV | 5.5 |
| Little Rock–Pine Bluff | Arkansas | KATV | 7.5 |
| Bakersfield | California | KBFX-CD | 58.4 |
| Chico–Redding | California | KCVU | 20.4 |
| Eureka | California | KBVU | 28.6 |
| Fresno–Visalia | California | KMPH-TV | 26.5 |
| Los Angeles | California | KCAL-TV | 9.2 |
| Sacramento–Stockton–Modesto | California | KXTV | 10.6 |
| San Diego | California | KFMB-TV | 8.6 |
| San Francisco–Oakland–San Jose | California | KPYX | 44.2 |
| Denver | Colorado | KTFD-TV | 50.3 |
| Denver | Colorado | KUSA | 9.6 |
| Hartford–New Haven | Connecticut | WTIC-TV | 61.5 |
| Washington | District of Columbia | WUSA | 9.4 |
| Gainesville | Florida | WNBW-DT | 9.5 |
| Jacksonville | Florida | WJXX | 25.5 |
| St. Petersburg–Tampa | Florida | WTSP | 10.4 |
| Tallahassee | Florida | WTLF | 24.4 |
| West Palm Beach | Florida | WPEC | 12.4 |
| West Palm Beach | Florida | WWHB-CD | 48.3 |
| Atlanta | Georgia | WXIA-TV | 11.4 |
| Macon | Georgia | WMAZ-TV | 13.5 |
| Boise | Idaho | KTVB | 7.5 |
| Boise | Idaho | KYUU-LD | 35.4 |
| Chicago | Illinois | WGN-TV | 9.5 |
| Springfield | Illinois | WBUI | 23.3 |
| Elkhart–South Bend | Indiana | WSJV | 28.7 |
| Indianapolis | Indiana | WTHR | 13.6 |
| Cedar Rapids | Iowa | KFXA | 28.4 |
| Davenport | Iowa | WQAD-TV | 8.6 |
| Des Moines | Iowa | WOI-DT | 5.4 |
| Sioux City | Iowa | KMEG | 14.4 |
| Wichita | Kansas | KMTW | 36.2 |
| Bowling Green | Kentucky | WDNZ-LD | 11.2 |
| Louisville | Kentucky | WHAS-TV | 11.5 |
| Paducah | Kentucky | WDKA | 49.4 |
| New Orleans | Louisiana | WWL-TV | 4.3 |
| Bangor | Maine | WLBZ | 2.4 |
| Portland | Maine | WGME-TV | 13.3 |
| Baltimore | Maryland | WNUV | 54.4 |
| Boston | Massachusetts | WUTF-TV | 27.3 |
| Flint–Saginaw–Bay City | Michigan | WEYI-TV | 25.4 |
| Flint–Saginaw–Bay City | Michigan | WSMH | 66.4 |
| Grand Rapids | Michigan | WXSP-CD | 15.2 |
| Minneapolis–Saint Paul | Minnesota | KARE | 11.5 |
| Jefferson City | Missouri | KRCG | 13.5 |
| Kansas City | Missouri | KCMN-LD | 42.4 |
| St. Louis | Missouri | KDNL-TV | 30.4 |
| Omaha | Nebraska | KXVO | 15.2 |
| Las Vegas | Nevada | KVCW | 33.4/5 |
| Reno | Nevada | KNSN-TV | 21.2 |
| Albany | New York | WCWN | 45.4 |
| Buffalo | New York | WNYO-TV | 49.2 |
| New York City | New York | WJLP | 33.6 |
| Rochester | New York | WHAM-TV | 13.4 |
| Charlotte | North Carolina | WCNC-TV | 36.5 |
| Greenville | North Carolina | WYDO | 14.3 |
| Raleigh | North Carolina | WLFL | 22.2 |
| Winston-Salem | North Carolina | WXLV-TV | 45.4 |
| Cincinnati | Ohio | WKRC-TV | 12.3 |
| Cleveland | Ohio | WKYC | 3.5 |
| Columbus | Ohio | WSYX | 6.2/.4 |
| Dayton | Ohio | WKEF | 22.3 |
| Dayton | Ohio | WNWO-TV | 24.5 |
| Toledo | Ohio | WTOL | 11.7 |
| Oklahoma City | Oklahoma | KOKH-TV | 25.3 |
| Tulsa | Oklahoma | KOKI-TV | 23.6 |
| Medford–Klamath Falls | Oregon | KTVL | 10.6 |
| Portland | Oregon | KUNP | 16.2 |
| Johnstown | Pennsylvania | WJAC-TV | 6.5 |
| Philadelphia | Pennsylvania | WPSG | 57.2 |
| Pittsburgh | Pennsylvania | WPNT | 22.2 |
| Scranton | Pennsylvania | WSWB | 38.4 |
| Providence | Rhode Island | WJAR | 10.5 |
| Charleston | South Carolina | WCIV | 36.3 |
| Columbia | South Carolina | WLTX | 19.5 |
| Greenville | South Carolina | WLOS | 13.4 |
| Myrtle Beach | South Carolina | WWMB | 21.3 |
| Bristol–Johnson City–Kingsport | Tennessee | WEMT | 39.4 |
| Knoxville | Tennessee | WBIR-TV | 10.5 |
| Memphis | Tennessee | WATN-TV | 24.6 |
| Nashville | Tennessee | WNAB | 58.2 |
| Austin | Texas | KVUE | 24.5 |
| Corpus Christi | Texas | KIII | 3.6 |
| Corpus Christi | Texas | KSCC | 38.6 |
| El Paso | Texas | KFOX-TV | 14.4 |
| Dallas–Fort Worth | Texas | KTXD-TV | 47.4 |
| Houston | Texas | KIAH | 39.3 |
| Port Arthur–Beaumont | Texas | KBTV-TV | 4.4 |
| San Antonio | Texas | KMYS | 35.2/.3 |
| Tyler | Texas | KYTX | 19.7 |
| Salt Lake City | Utah | KTVX | 4.4 |
| Portsmouth–Norfolk–Newport News–Virginia Beach | Virginia | WAVY-TV | 10.2 |
| Richmond | Virginia | WRLH-TV | 35.5 |
| Kennewick | Washington | KVVK-CD | 15.3 |
| Seattle–Tacoma | Washington | KUNS-TV | 51.3 |
| Spokane | Washington | KREM | 2.4 |
| Yakima | Washington | KUNW-CD | 2.3 |
| Madison | Wisconsin | WMSN-TV | 47.5 |
| Green Bay | Wisconsin | WCWF | 14.4 |
| Milwaukee | Wisconsin | WVTV | 24.5 |
| Charleston–Huntington | West Virginia | WVAH-TV | 11.2 |
