= KRVU-LD =

Television station in Redding, California

KRVU-LD and KZVU-LD
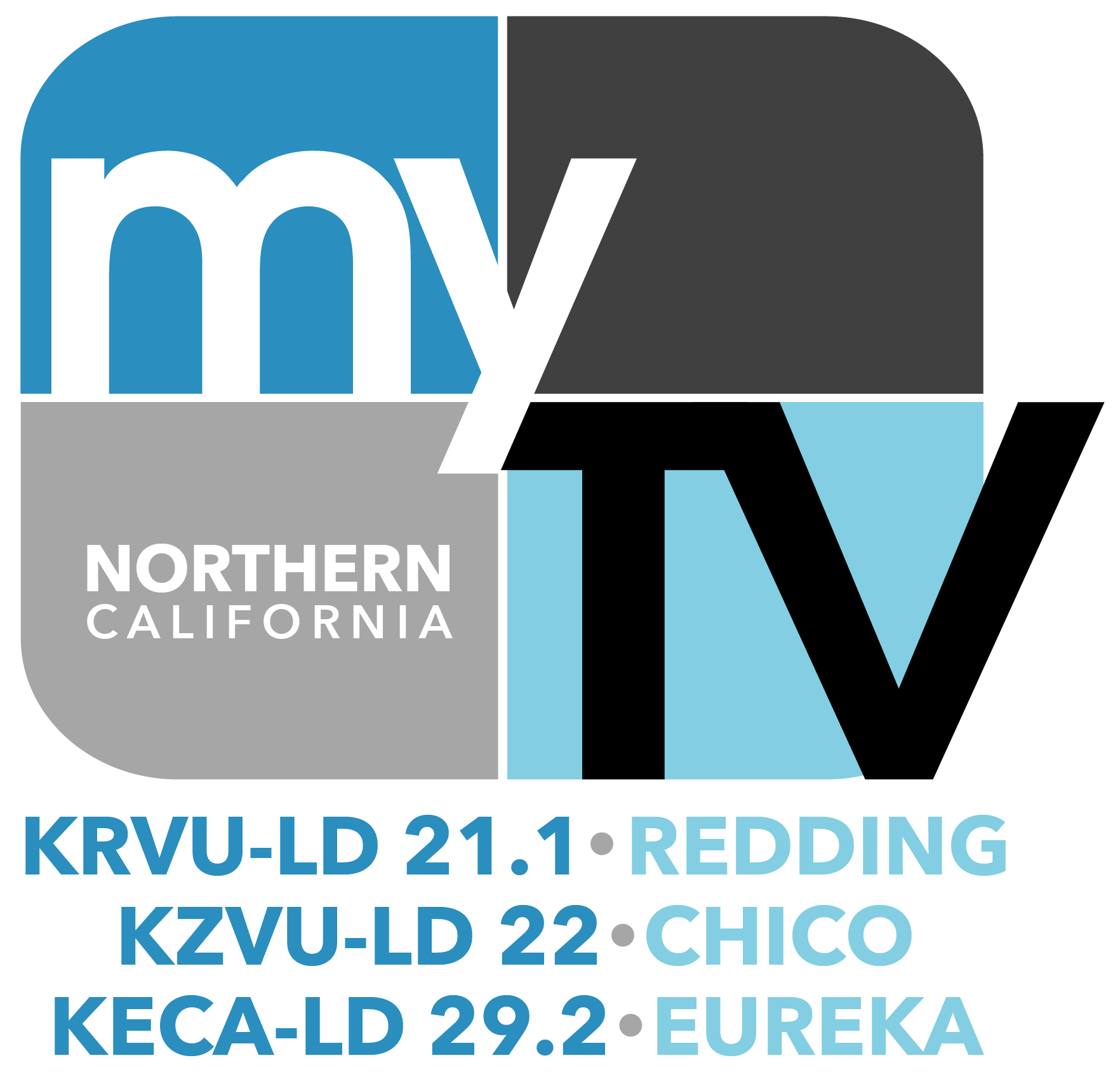

KRVU-LD: Redding, California; KZVU-LD: Chico, California; United States
- Channels for KRVU-LD: Digital: 21 (UHF); Virtual: 21
- Channels for KZVU-LD: Digital: 22 (UHF); Virtual: 22
- Branding: myTV Northern California

Programming
- Affiliations: 21.1/22.1: Independent with MyNetworkTV; for others, see § Technical information

Ownership
- Owner: Sinclair Broadcast Group; (Sinclair-California Licensee, LLC)
- Sister stations: KRCR-TV, KCVU, KUCO-LD, KKTF-LD, KXVU-LD

History
- First air date: KRVU-LD: October 2, 1993; KZVU-LD: July 26, 1994
- Former call signs: KRVU-LD: K22EJ (1993–1997); KRVU-LP (1997–2009); KZVU-LD: K21DS (1993–1997); KZVU-LP (1997–2009)
- Former channel number: KRVU-LD: Analog: 21 (UHF, 1993–2008); KZVU-LD: Analog: 22 (UHF, 1993–2008)
- Former affiliations: Independent (1993–1997); UPN (1997–2006)
- Call sign meaning: No meaning; the "VU" letters are also used on sister stations KCVU and KXVU-LD

Technical information
- Licensing authority: FCC
- Facility ID: KRVU-LD: 40203; KZVU-LD: 58612
- Class: LD
- ERP: 6 kW
- HAAT: KRVU-LD: 457.8 m (1,502 ft); KZVU-LD: 361.6 m (1,186 ft)
- Transmitter coordinates: KRVU-LD: 40°39′15.5″N 122°31′17″W; KZVU-LD: 39°57′45″N 121°42′44″W
- Translator: KECA-LD 29.2 Eureka

Links
- Public license information: KRVU-LD: LMS

KRVU-LD (channel 21) is a low-power television station in Redding, California, United States, serving the Chico–Redding market. It is programmed primarily as an independent station, but maintains a secondary affiliation with MyNetworkTV. KRVU-LD is owned by Sinclair Broadcast Group alongside ABC/Fox affiliate KRCR-TV (channel 7), KCVU (channel 20), and three other low-power stations: Antenna TV affiliate KXVU-LD (channel 17), Univision affiliate KUCO-LD (channel 27), and UniMás affiliate KKTF-LD (channel 30). The stations share studios on Auditorium Drive east of downtown Redding and maintain a news bureau and sales office at the former Sainte Television Group facilities on Main Street in downtown Chico. KRVU-LD's transmitter is located near Shasta, California.

== History ==
KRVU/KZVU was founded by Sainte Partners II, L.P., owned by country-western singer Chester Smith and hit the air in 1993, seven years after the founding of KCVU (KZVU-LD was originally K21DS from 1993 to 1997 and KZVU-LP from 1997 to 2009). It became an affiliate of the fledgling new UPN network in 1997 and would change affiliations to MyNetworkTV following the creation of The CW in 2006. Smith remained owner until his death in 2008.

=== Merger with Eureka Television Group ===
On April 27, 2009, KRVU/KZVU merged its operations with sister station KEMY in Eureka, California, and both stations were rebranded "Northern California's My TV".

=== Sale to Bonten Media Group ===
KRVU and its sister stations were sold to Bonten Media Group in 2012. (The flagship station of Sainte, KCVU FOX 20, was sold to Esteem Broadcasting, but became operated by Bonten.)

The station was formerly known as MyTV Northern California, but reverted to its original call letters upon the station's purchase in 2012.

KEMY would be dissolved in 2014 after Bonten launched KECA-LD as its digital replacement in the Eureka market, with KRVU/MyNetworkTV programming appearing on its digital subchannel.

=== Sale to Sinclair ===
On April 21, 2017, Sinclair Broadcast Group announced its intent to purchase the Bonten stations (including KRVU-LD) for $240 million. The deal came immediately following the re-instatement of the "UHF discount", which reduces the calculated "reach" of a station for the purposes of national ownership limits if it broadcasts on a UHF channel. The sale was completed September 1.

== Technical information ==
=== KRVU-LD subchannels ===
KRVU-LD's signal is multiplexed:

Subchannels of KRVU-LD
Channel	Res.	Short name	Programming
21.1	720p	MyTV	Main KRVU-LD programming
38.2	480i	COMET	Comet (KCVU)
46.1	1080i	UNIV	Univision (KUCO-LD)

Simulcast of subchannels of another station

=== KZVU-LD subchannel ===
Subchannel of KZVU-LD
Channel	Res.	Short name	Programming
22.1	720p	KZVU-SD	Main KZVU-LD programming

=== Early switch ===
KCVU, along with KHSL-TV and KNVN ceased analog operations on December 22, 2008. KCVU ceased analog operations early because the post-transition tower was complete and had been up and running for at least seven months; same case with KHSL. In the case of KBVU and its sister stations, the transition for some was much later as KUCO-LP, KXVU-LP, KKTF-LD, and both KBVU and MyTV's analog translators remained analog through late 2009/early 2010 when the Sainte Television Group ended all of its analog operations.

KVIQ and KBVU already made the switch on November 28, 2008.
