= KRCR-TV =

Television station in Redding, California

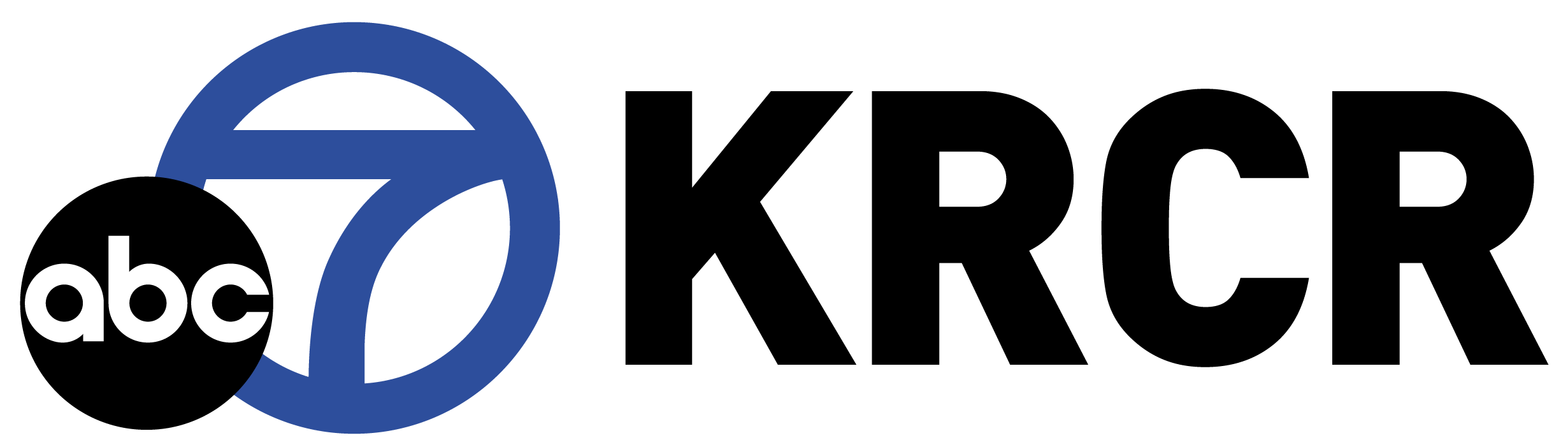

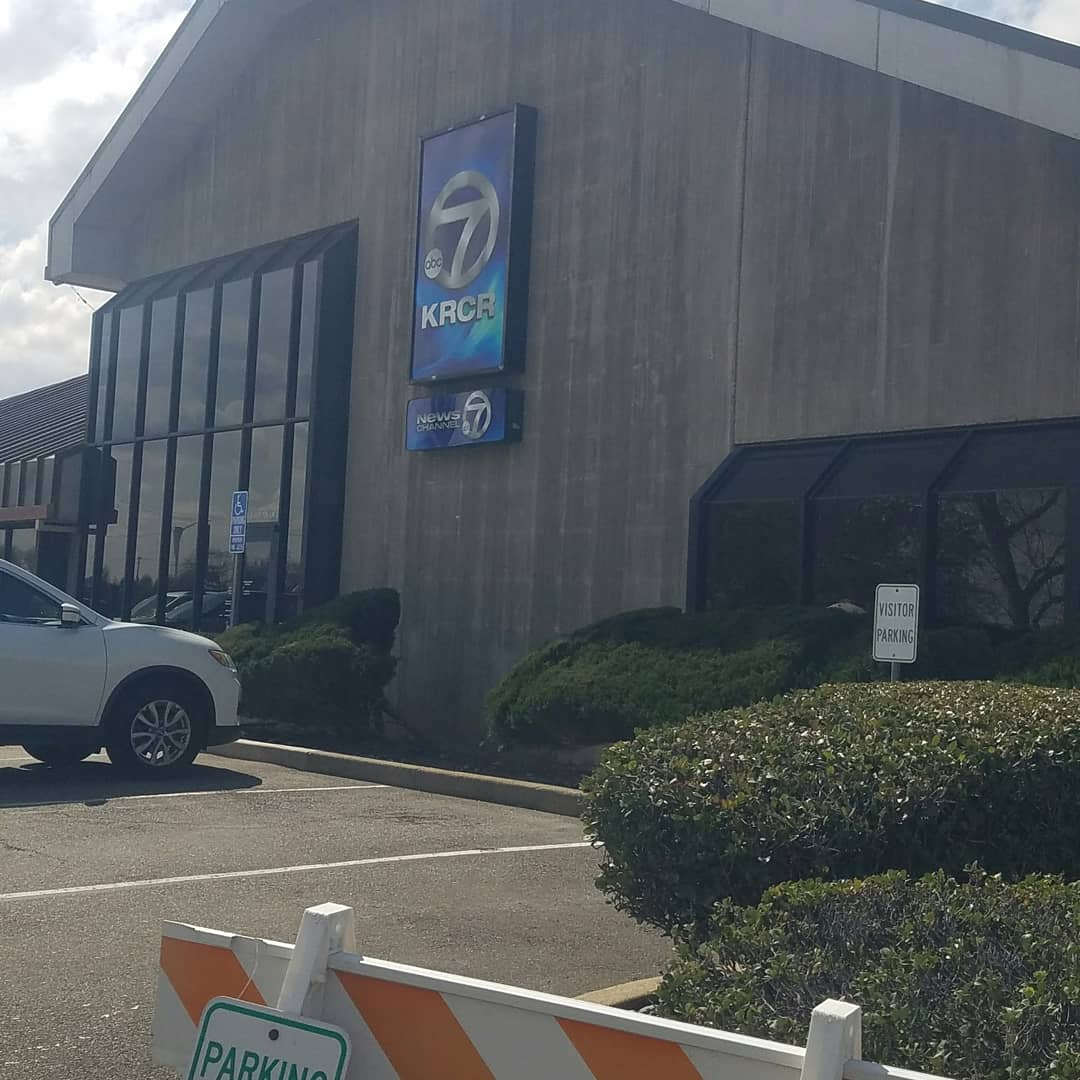
- KRCR studio and office building in Redding
- Redding–Chico, California; United States
- City: Redding, California
- Channels: Digital: 15 (UHF); Virtual: 7
- Branding: ABC 7; Fox 20 (7.2)

Programming
- Affiliations: 7.1: ABC; 7.2: Fox; 7.3: Comet

Ownership
- Owner: Sinclair Broadcast Group; (Sinclair Media Licensee, LLC)
- Sister stations: KAEF-TV, KCVU, KXVU-LD, KRVU-LD/KZVU-LD, KUCO-LD, KKTF-LD, KTVL

History
- First air date: August 1, 1956
- Former call signs: KVIP (1956–1957); KVIP-TV (1957–1963)
- Former channel numbers: Analog: 7 (VHF, 1956–2009); Digital: 34 (UHF, 2003–2009), 7 (VHF, 2009–2024)
- Former affiliations: NBC (1956–1978); Fox (secondary, 1986–1994)
- Call sign meaning: Redding, Chico, Red Bluff

Technical information
- Licensing authority: FCC
- Facility ID: 8291
- ERP: 1,000 kW (CP)
- HAAT: 1,095 m (3,593 ft)
- Transmitter coordinates: 40°36′9.5″N 122°39′4″W
- Translator(s): 34 (UHF) Redding; for others, see § Translators

Links
- Public license information: Public file; LMS
- Website: krcrtv.com

KRCR-TV (channel 7) is a television station licensed to Redding, California, United States, serving as the ABC and Fox affiliate for the Chico–Redding market. It is owned by Sinclair Broadcast Group alongside KCVU (channel 20), KXVU-LD (channel 17), KRVU-LD (channel 21), KZVU-LD (channel 22), KUCO-LD (channel 27), and KKTF-LD (channel 30). The stations share studios on Auditorium Drive east of downtown Redding and maintain a news bureau and sales office at the former Sainte Television Group facilities on Main Street in downtown Chico. KRCR's transmitter is located atop Shasta Bally, west of Redding.

KAEF-TV (channel 23) in Arcata operates as a semi-satellite of KRCR, serving the Eureka market. As such, it clears all network programming as provided through KRCR but airs a separate offering of syndicated programming; there are also separate local newscasts, commercial inserts and legal station identifications. Although KAEF maintains its own studios (shared with KBVU) on Sixth Street in downtown Eureka, master control and some internal operations are based at KRCR's facilities.

== History ==
The station was founded in 1956 as KVIP (adding the "-TV" suffix to its callsign on August 15, 1957) by William B. Smullin of California Oregon Broadcasting, Inc. (COBI), owners of KOBI in Medford, Oregon, and satellite station KOTI in Klamath Falls, as a primary NBC affiliate with a secondary ABC affiliation. By 1963, network emphasis had shifted towards ABC, as only the Saturday morning and Sunday night prime time schedules, a few daytime game shows and The Tonight Show Starring Johnny Carson were carried in NBC's schedule pattern. The full ABC schedule was available by way of translators of Stockton's KOVR in Chico and Redding. Channel 7 became KRCR in 1963.

It dropped NBC and took on a full-time ABC affiliation in 1978, which in turn started the seven-year process for building KCPM (channel 24, now KNVN). This was an unusual arrangement for a two-station market especially one of the size of Chico–Redding, but after 15 years of unsuccessful attempts the area was served by a local ABC affiliate.

7R logo used by KRCR television in Redding, California in the 1960s.

Under COBI ownership, KRCR used a logo consisting of an Interstate shield sign like its sister stations, placing "7R" where the number would be. 7R was adapted as branding for the station at that time, as the Northern California TV Guide edition identified it with a "7R" 'channel bullet' to differentiate it from ABC owned-and-operated station KGO-TV in San Francisco and its similar network schedule.

KRCR, KAEF, and KFWU in Fort Bragg (now KQSL in Cloverdale, part of the San Francisco TV market), aired Fox full-time on off-network hours from the network's launch in 1986 until 1994 when now-sister station KCVU switched to Fox and KBVU signed on.

KRCR was purchased by Lamco Communications of Texas in 1995 and was rebranded News Channel 7, which remains the branding for the newscasts. The station was operated by California Broadcasting, Inc., and run by general manager Bob Wise (now of KOBI) until 2004 when the station was sold to Bluestone Television. In December 2006, the station was sold (along with 12 other Bluestone stations) to Diamond Castle Holdings, a New York-based private equity firm, which later became Bonten Media Group.

The station also operates a semi-satellite in Eureka, KAEF-TV (channel 23). It operated a local cable-only WB affiliate KIWB, but that station was sold to Catamount Broadcasting following the merger between the WB and UPN to form the new CW Network. KRVU-LD was previously a UPN affiliate but is now a MyNetworkTV affiliate.

KRCR was one of a select few ABC affiliates that broadcast on channel 7, but chose not to license the network's Circle 7 logo, until April 11, 2006, when the station rebranded and introduced its new set, along with the digital age allowing clear differentiation of both KRCR and KGO's signals via virtual channel data if a viewer was in position to receive both stations.

=== Merger with KCVU and KBVU ===
In December 2012, KRCR/KAEF took over sales operations of KCVU in Chico, as well as KVIQ and KBVU in Eureka. They still maintain separate operations.

In August 2012, Bonten Media announced that KCVU and KBVU would be sold to Esteem Broadcasting, effectively merging both the ABC and Fox affiliates' operations to create a media powerhouse north of Sacramento and south of the Oregon border.

On April 21, 2017, Sinclair Broadcast Group announced its intent to purchase the Bonten stations (including KRCR) for $240 million. Sinclair's sidecar Cunningham Broadcasting acquired the Esteem stations (including KCVU). The sale was completed September 1.

On December 9, 2025, the Fox affiliation was moved from KCVU to KRCR-TV's second subchannel, while KCVU's main channel flipped to Roar.

The Northstate's News logo (2023-present)

== Notable former on-air staff ==
- Rich Eisen – sports anchor/reporter
- Mark Eubank – meteorologist
- Sandra Maas – news anchor/reporter
- Craig Padilla – chief creative services editor and production manager
- Kristen Welker

== What Makes News Channel 7? ==
In the fall of 1995, Continental Cablevision of Mt. Shasta (now part of Vyve Broadband) filmed, produced and broadcast a 30-minute documentary special called What Makes News Channel 7? as part of its newsmagazine series In Focus: Siskiyou Magazine. It took a look behind the scenes at what went on at the station and focused mainly on the news team featuring a behind-the-scenes look at how a newscast is produced as well as interviews with key personalities such as Mike Mangas, Rich Eisen, Sandra Geist, Warren Wright, Gary Gunter and Katy Brown. The program aired on Mt. Shasta cable channel 3 in the winter and spring of 1996 and starting showing on YouTube and MySpace in February 2010. It was rebroadcast over Mt. Shasta cable airwaves again on MCTV 15 in 2010 leading to that program's relaunch.

== Technical information ==
=== Subchannels ===
The station's digital signal is multiplexed:

Subchannels of KRCR-TV
Subchannel	Res.	Short name	Programming
7.1	720p	KRCR-TV	ABC
7.2	720p	FOX	Fox
7.3	480i	COMET	Comet

On August 23, 2011, Disney-ABC Television Group announced that KRCR would carry Live Well Network as part of an affiliation agreement with Bonten Media Group; the network was added to a new third subchannel. Live Well Network was replaced by Movies! on November 18, 2013, only for it to be replaced by Comet on September 1, 2022.

=== Analog-to-digital conversion ===
KRCR-TV ended regular programming on its analog signal, over VHF channel 7, on June 12, 2009, the official date when full-power television stations in the United States transitioned from analog to digital broadcasts under federal mandate. The station's digital signal relocated from UHF channel 34 to VHF channel 7. The station's pre-transition channel position on channel 34 was later converted to a translator.

=== Translators ===
- K12JJ-D Benbow, etc.
- K05DQ-D Burney, etc.
- K15CX-D Oroville
- K05EM-D Paradise
- KRCR-TV (DRT) Redding
- K05CF-D Weaverville

==== Former translators ====
In the early 1990s, KRCR operated a satellite, KFWU (channel 8), in Fort Bragg; originally serving as an ABC affiliate for the Mendocino County portion of the San Francisco Bay Area television market; the station would be sold in 1996. It is currently independent station KQSL.

KRCR was formerly broadcast on translators channel 2 in Lakehead; channel 3 in Lewiston and Mountain Gate; channel 4 in Big Bend, etc., Hayfork and Covelo; channel 5 in Mineral and Trinity Center; channel 20 in Yuba City, part of the Sacramento television market (KRCR no longer broadcasts at all in Yuba City) and channel 21 in Susanville, part of the Reno market.

== Carriage disputes ==
=== Mt. Shasta cable dispute ===
Since its inception in the mid-1980s, the Mt. Shasta cable system owned by Northland Communications (now Vyve Broadband) had carried KRCR on its cable channel 7. However, in January 2012, Northland dropped KRCR from its cable lineup after the station's current ownership and the cable company failed to come to a mutual agreement to continue the station's coverage on the system and severed ties after a near-30-year working relationship between the two. As a result, Northland replaced KRCR on cable channel 7 with Medford, Oregon's ABC affiliate, KDRV (channel 12).

Despite being in California, Siskiyou County is part of the Medford market according to the FCC. Both KRCR and Northland made several attempts to get the DMA changed but were unsuccessful each time. KHSL-TV, KNVN-TV and KIXE-TV were the only Chico–Redding market stations airing on the Northland system in Mt. Shasta; however, certain programs on KHSL and KNVN are subject to blackout due to the FCC's network non-duplication and syndication exclusivity rules.

In 2021, KRCR returned to the Vyve Broadband cable line-up on channel 12 (replacing KHSL-TV) and its sister station KRVU returned to cable channel 2. (KIXE-TV remains on channel 9.)

=== Disputes with Dish Network ===
Under its former Bonten ownership, the company and Dish Network had two retransmission consent issues that led to Bonten stations (including KRCR) to be removed from the provider. As a result, on December 8, 2013, Dish stopped carrying KRCR on their system before a later restoration. On January 17, 2017, KRCR and KCVU were once again removed from Dish's lineup as part of a new dispute, returning on February 13.
