= KCVU =

Television station in Paradise, California

- Paradise–Chico–Redding, California; United States
- City: Paradise, California
- Channels: Digital: 30 (UHF); Virtual: 20

Programming
- Affiliations: 20.1: Roar; for others, see § Technical information and subchannels

Ownership
- Owner: Sinclair Broadcast Group; (Sinclair Media Licensee, LLC)
- Sister stations: KRCR-TV, KRVU-LD, KZVU-LD, KUCO-LD, KXVU-LD, KKTF-LD

History
- Founded: May 14, 1986
- First air date: November 14, 1990
- Former call signs: KBCP (1990–1992)
- Former channel numbers: Analog: 30 (UHF, 1990–2008); Digital: 20 (UHF, 2002–2020), 17 (UHF, 2020–2021)
- Former affiliations: Independent (1990–1994); Fox (1994–2025); UPN (secondary, 1995–1997); The WB (secondary, 1995–1998)
- Call sign meaning: No meaning; the "VU" letters are also used on sister stations KRVU-LD/KZVU-LD and KXVU-LD

Technical information
- Licensing authority: FCC
- Facility ID: 58605
- ERP: 500 kW
- HAAT: 430.6 m (1,413 ft)
- Transmitter coordinates: 39°57′42.7″N 121°42′43.1″W
- Translator(s): KRCR-TV 20.1 Redding; K22MD-D Anderson/Central Valley

Links
- Public license information: Public file; LMS

KCVU (channel 20) is a television station licensed to Paradise, California, United States, serving the Chico–Redding market with programming from the digital multicast network Roar. It is owned by Sinclair Broadcast Group alongside Redding-licensed ABC/Fox affiliate KRCR-TV (channel 7) and five low-power stations: Antenna TV affiliate KXVU-LD (channel 17); MyNetworkTV affiliates KRVU-LD (channel 22) and KZVU-LD (channel 21); Univision affiliate KUCO-LD (channel 27); and UniMás affiliate KKTF-LD (channel 30). The stations share studios on Auditorium Drive east of downtown Redding and maintain a news bureau and sales office at the former Sainte Television Group facilities on Main Street in downtown Chico. KCVU's transmitter is located along Cohasset Road northeast of Chico.

KBVU (channel 28) in Eureka operates as a semi-satellite of KCVU. As such, it clears all Roar programming as provided through its parent station, with the only difference being the hourly station identification as Roar uses a master default schedule.

== History ==
KCVU FOX 20 logo, used from 2008-2013

The station was founded in 1986 by Chester Smith and his company Sainte Partners II, L.P. of Modesto, California, and started broadcasting as KBCP on channel 30 on November 14, 1990. It was the first Sainte station to broadcast in English; its programming consisted of Christian and home shopping programming, though Smith expressed an interest in a potential Fox affiliation at that time. The call letters changed to KCVU on October 16, 1992, and the station returned to air October 6, 1993. On January 1, 1994, the station finally obtained a Fox affiliation. It replaced an affiliation on KRCR-TV seen during non-ABC hours since the network's inception in 1986. KRCR's other two satellites in Eureka and Fort Bragg carried both Fox and ABC programming. Additional Fox coverage was provided by KTXL and KTVU on Chico and Redding cable systems.

=== Carriage dispute with Northland Cable ===
On May 6, 2007, KCVU replaced Medford, Oregon Fox affiliate KMVU on Northland Cable Television channel 13 in both Mt. Shasta and Yreka when KMVU and Northland could not come to an agreement for KMVU to remain on the cable system. (Northland also carried sister station MyTV Northern California on cable channel 2, but it was replaced with KFBI-LP of Medford.) As a result, Northland was blocked from airing Fox network programming.

On February 8, 2008, the Siskiyou Daily News reported that the dispute was being resolved and Northland was working with KMVU and KCVU to return either channel to both cable systems. KNVN replaced KMVU on channel 13 in Mt. Shasta and channel 11 in Yreka. KHSL-TV started to air on channel 6 in Yreka and KDRV is also on channel 6 in Mt. Shasta.

KMVU won the carriage dispute, and KCVU is no longer available on any cable system outside the Chico–Redding market because all Fox affiliates are under syndex. KMVU and all other local stations are fed to Yreka via OTA translator. These stations all have fiber optic links to Mt. Shasta, except for KNVN, which uses a Dish Network feed.

=== Death of Chester Smith ===
The Sacramento Bee and Chico Enterprise Record reported that the founder of Sainte Partners, Chester Smith, died on August 8, 2008, at Stanford University Medical Center in Palo Alto, California, at the age of 78. He was survived by his wife and his children. Despite Smith's death, Sainte continued to own and operate KCVU and its sister stations in the Sainte family. The family continued to operate the station group despite poor financial practices.

In August 2012, it was announced that Sainte would sell KCVU and KBVU to Esteem Broadcasting of California and would fully merge its operations with ABC affiliates KRCR and KAEF.

=== Sale to Cunningham; then to Sinclair ===
On April 21, 2017, Sinclair Broadcast Group announced its intent to purchase the Bonten stations, including KRCR, for $240 million. As part of the deal, Sinclair's sidecar Cunningham Broadcasting acquired the Esteem stations, including KCVU. The sale was completed September 1, 2017.

Sinclair filed to buy KCVU outright from Cunningham in August 2025, following a decision by the United States Court of Appeals for the Eighth Circuit that struck down limitations on ownership of two of the four highest-rated TV stations in a market. On December 9, 2025, the Fox affiliation was moved to KRCR-TV's second subchannel, while KCVU's main channel flipped to Roar. The sale was completed on March 1, 2026.

== Newscasts ==
From February 2004 to June 2005, Fox 30 News at 10:00 pm was produced by KRCR-TV, utilizing that station's news department.

On April 1, 2013, KCVU relaunched its local news coverage with KRCR News Channel 7 at 10 on Fox 20, which airs weeknights at 10 p.m. with Tracey Leong and Mark Mester as anchors.

== Technical information and subchannels ==
The station's signal is multiplexed:

Subchannels of KCVU
| Channel | Res. | Short name | Programming |
|---|---|---|---|
| 20.1 | 720p | KCVU-HD | Roar |
| 20.2 | 480i | COMET | Comet |
| 20.3 | 480i | CHARGE | Charge! |
| 20.4 | 480i | NEST | The Nest |
| 20.5 | 480i | DABL | Dabl |

On August 21, 2009, KCVU and KBVU replaced the digital simulcast of MyNetworkTV with This TV on their DT2 sub-carriers. This was later replaced with Cozi TV.

=== Analog-to-digital conversion ===
On December 22, 2008, KCVU shut down its analog signal, over UHF channel 30, due to financial hardship; KCVU used its existing digital facilities, as did its other debt-ridden rivals KHSL and KNVN. The virtual channel was changed from 30 to 20 and the station was re-branded as "Fox 20 Digital".

=== Translators ===
- K22MD-D Anderson/Central Valley
- K26PQ-D Oroville

== See also ==
- Channel 17 digital TV stations in the United States
- Channel 20 virtual TV stations in the United States
