= KKTF-LD =

Television station in Chico, California

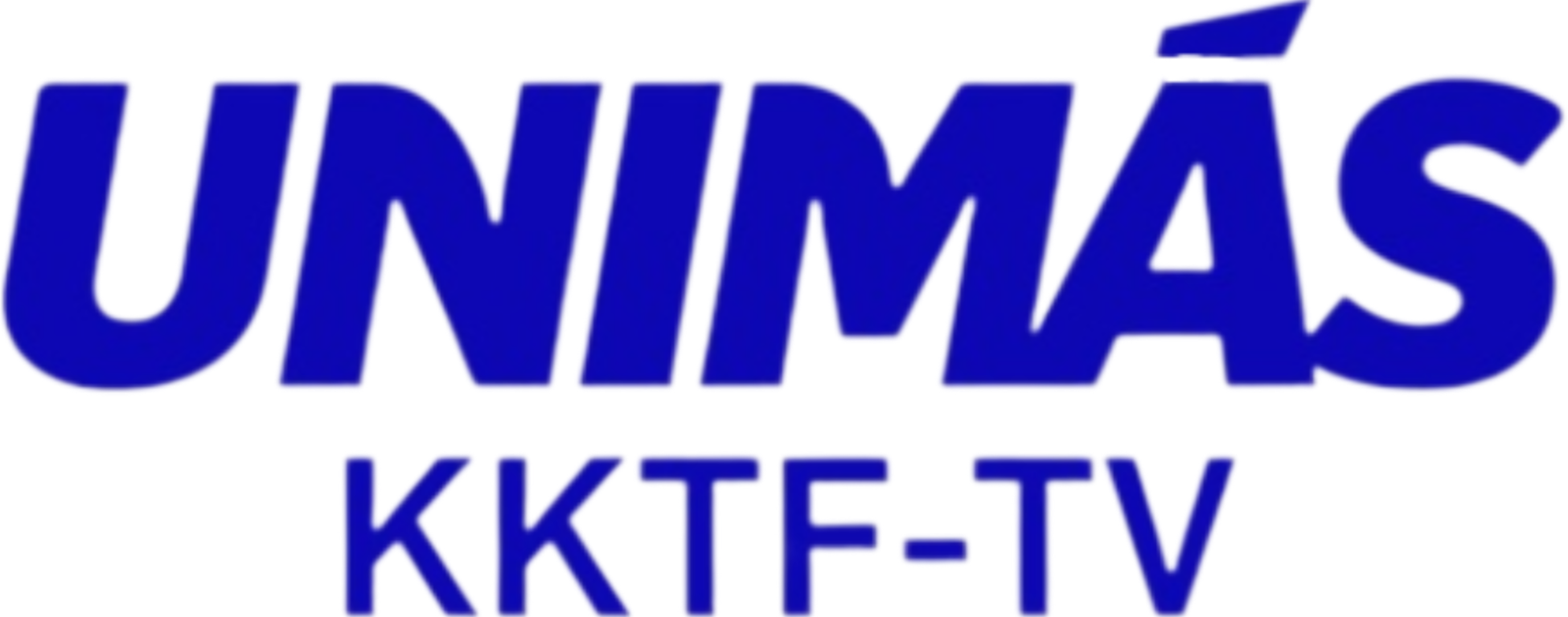
- Chico, California; United States
- Channels: Digital: 24 (UHF); Virtual: 30
- Branding: UniMás KKTF-TV

Programming
- Affiliations: 30.1: UniMás

Ownership
- Owner: Sinclair Broadcast Group; (Sinclair-California Licensee, LLC)
- Sister stations: KRCR-TV, KCVU, KUCO-LD, KXVU-LD, KRVU-LD/KZVU-LD

History
- First air date: December 8, 2003
- Former call signs: K57JJ (2003–2006); K35HY (2006–2007); KKTF-LP (2007–2010)
- Former channel numbers: Analog: 35 (UHF, 2007–2010); Digital: 30 (UHF, 2010–2022)
- Call sign meaning: K Telefutura (former name of UniMás)

Technical information
- Licensing authority: FCC
- Facility ID: 131020
- Class: LD
- ERP: 15 kW
- HAAT: 374.2 m (1,228 ft)
- Transmitter coordinates: 39°57′45″N 121°42′44″W
- Translator(s): KUCO-LD 27.2 Chico

Links
- Public license information: LMS

KKTF-LD (channel 30) is a low-power television station licensed to Chico, California, United States, serving the Chico–Redding market as an affiliate of the Spanish-language network UniMás. It is owned by Sinclair Broadcast Group alongside ABC/Fox affiliate KRCR-TV (channel 7), KCVU (channel 20), and four other low-power stations: Antenna TV affiliate KXVU-LD (channel 17); MyNetworkTV affiliates KRVU-LD (channel 21) and KZVU-LD (channel 22), and Univision affiliate KUCO-LD (channel 27). The stations share studios on Auditorium Drive east of downtown Redding and maintain a news bureau and sales office at the former Sainte Television Group facilities on Main Street in downtown Chico. KKTF-LD's transmitter is located along Cohasset Road northeast of Chico.

== Subchannels ==
The station's signal is multiplexed:

Subchannels of KKTF-LD
Channel	Res.	Short name	Programming
30.1	480i	KKTF-LD	UniMás (4:3)
