= WYDO =

Television station in Greenville, North Carolina

- Greenville–Washington–New Bern–; Jacksonville, North Carolina; United States
- City: Greenville, North Carolina
- Channels: Digital: 19 (UHF); Virtual: 14

Programming
- Affiliations: 14.1: Roar; for others, see § Technical information and subchannels

Ownership
- Owner: Sinclair Broadcast Group; (WCTI Licensee, LLC)
- Sister stations: WCTI-TV

History
- Founded: October 2, 1989
- First air date: June 30, 1992
- Former channel numbers: Analog: 14 (UHF, 1992–2009); Digital: 21 (UHF, 2006–2009), 47 (UHF, 2009–2020)
- Former affiliations: Fox (1992–2025)
- Call sign meaning: Sequentially assigned

Technical information
- Licensing authority: FCC
- Facility ID: 35582
- ERP: 350 kW
- HAAT: 581.4 m (1,907 ft)
- Transmitter coordinates: 35°6′16″N 77°20′11″W

Links
- Public license information: Public file; LMS
- Website: wcti12.com/fox-eastern-carolina

Former satellite station
- WFXI
- Morehead City, North Carolina
- Channels: Digital: 8 (VHF); Virtual: 8

Programming
- Affiliations: Fox (1989–2017); Bounce TV (8.2, until 2017)

History
- Founded: April 7, 1988
- First air date: November 1, 1989
- Last air date: September 6, 2017
- Former channel numbers: Analog: 8 (VHF, 1989–2009); Digital: 24 (UHF, until 2009)
- Call sign meaning: "Fox Inner Banks"

Technical information
- Facility ID: 37982
- ERP: 22.4 kW
- HAAT: 247.4 m (812 ft)
- Transmitter coordinates: 34°53′1.0″N 76°30′22.0″W

WYDO (channel 14) is a television station licensed to Greenville, North Carolina, United States, serving Eastern North Carolina with programming from the digital multicast network Roar. It is owned by Sinclair Broadcast Group alongside New Bern–licensed ABC/Fox affiliate WCTI-TV (channel 12). The two stations share studios on Glenburnie Drive in New Bern; WYDO's transmitter is located north of Trenton along NC 41.

The station's main signal was originally WFXI (channel 8), licensed to Morehead City. WFXI's signal covered the eastern portion of the market, while WYDO served as a full satellite for the western portion. On September 6, 2017, WFXI was shut down as a result of the Federal Communications Commission (FCC)'s spectrum auction, leaving WYDO as the sole Fox affiliate for the region. At the same time, the station was sold by Esteem Broadcasting—an affiliate of WCTI owner Bonten Media Group—to Cunningham Broadcasting, a partner company of Sinclair (which had acquired Bonten).

== History ==
WFXI signed on November 1, 1989, as the area's fourth commercial television station. It immediately assumed the Fox affiliation and aired an analog signal on VHF channel 8. Prior to WFXI's sign-on, residents in the eastern North Carolina area received their Fox programs on cable via Raleigh's WLFL or Washington, D.C.'s Fox owned-and-operated WTTG (both stations were carried as superstations before the network began operations). For all intents and purposes, WFXI was Eastern North Carolina's first independent station. Fox would not air a full week of programming until 1993, and most early Fox affiliates were programmed as independents.

The station had to operate at considerably lower power than the other stations in this large market because it was short-spaced to both Washington, North Carolina-licensed WITN-TV (channel 7) and Greenville-based WNCT-TV (channel 9). WFXI's signal also had to protect WXEX-TV (now WRIC-TV) in Petersburg, Virginia, which also operated on channel 8. This resulted in a broadcasting radius that only reached the southeastern portions of the Eastern North Carolina designated market area—namely Morehead City, Jacksonville, and New Bern.

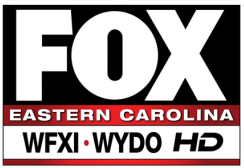
Final WFXI/WYDO logo used until 2017.

As a condition of keeping its Fox affiliation, WFXI signed on full-time satellite WYDO on June 30, 1992. This station aired an analog signal on UHF channel 14 from a transmitter southeast of Ayden that covered Greenville, Washington and the northwestern parts of the Inner Banks region. In addition to resolving reception issues for WFXI, WYDO also provided an additional opportunity for local advertising. While WFXI's studios were always based in Morehead City on Arendell Street/US 70, WYDO operated an advertising sales office in different locations in Greenville (the last one was located on Red Banks Road).

On April 18, 2006, a preliminary announcement was made public stating WFXI and WYDO would each add new second digital subchannels in order to affiliate with MyNetworkTV (a new broadcast network and sister operation to Fox). However, officials later changed their mind, and on August 11, moved the pending affiliation to a secondary arrangement through Ion Television owned-and-operated station WEPX-TV (and its full-time satellite, WPXU-TV). For a time, WFXI shared its call sign with a now defunct Class A repeater of a fellow Fox affiliate in Youngstown, Ohio. Although both stations were owned by Piedmont Television until 2007, the two were otherwise unrelated.

On November 6, 2007, it was announced the Federal Communications Commission (FCC) approved the sale of certain WFXI/WYDO assets from Piedmont Television to the Bonten Media Group (owner of WCTI) with the license being sold to Esteem Broadcasting. As part of the deal, WFXI moved from its longtime home to WCTI's facility in New Bern while WYDO closed its sales office. For a while, WFXI's studios in Morehead City continued to be used for a WCTI advertising sales office. In January 2008, after Bonten took over operation of the two stations through a shared services arrangement, they were co-branded together as "Fox Eastern Carolina" and a new logo was made public. The outlets had previously been known on-air as "Fox 8/Fox 14" for many years. The web address remained in that branding until August 2010 when it was integrated into a separate section of WCTI's website.

WFXI/WYDO made local headlines with difficulties transmitting Super Bowl XLII on February 3, 2008. The transmission outage left several thousand viewers unable to watch the game in Eastern North Carolina.

On April 21, 2017, the Sinclair Broadcast Group announced its intent to purchase the Bonten stations (including WCTI-TV) for $240 million. As an aspect of the deal, the Esteem stations were sold to Sinclair affiliate Cunningham Broadcasting, maintaining the current operational arrangement. The sale was completed September 1.

Sinclair filed to buy WYDO outright from Cunningham in August 2025, following a decision by the United States Court of Appeals for the Eighth Circuit that struck down limitations on ownership of two of the four highest-rated TV stations in a market. On December 8, 2025, the station flipped to Roar and the Fox affiliation was moved to WCTI-DT2. The sale was completed on March 1, 2026.

== News operation ==
On September 4, 1995, WFXI/WYDO began airing the market's original prime time newscast, produced by CBS affiliate WNCT-TV (then owned by Park Communications) through a news share agreement. Known on-air as Fox News at 10, the broadcast could be seen every night for thirty minutes.

After Esteem acquired WFXI/WYDO in 2007 and outsourced its operations to WCTI, a new 10 p.m. newscast from that station under the title Fox Eastern Carolina News debuted on January 28, 2008. It was expanded to an hour on weeknights while remaining a half-hour on weekends. Meanwhile, WNCT began airing its own half-hour newscast at 10 on its CW-affiliated subchannel.

== Technical information and subchannels ==
WYDO's transmitter is located north of Trenton along NC 41. Its signal is multiplexed:

Subchannels of WYDO
Subchannel	Res.	Short name	Programming
14.1	720p	WYDO-DT	Roar
14.2	480i	Charge	Charge! (4:3)
14.3	480i	TheNest	The Nest (4:3)
14.4	480i	Bounce	Bounce TV (4:3)

=== Analog-to-digital conversion ===
At midnight on June 13, 2009, WYDO and WFXI went all-digital as part of the DTV transition.

=== FCC spectrum sale ===
In the FCC's incentive auction, WFXI sold its spectrum for $42,070,860 and indicated that it would go off the air with no channel sharing agreement. On July 30, 2017, WCTI-TV announced that WFXI would shut down on September 6, 2017; WYDO would remain on the air as the market's sole Fox affiliate. Few viewers lost access to Fox programming due to the extremely dense penetration of cable and satellite, which are all but essential for acceptable television in much of this vast market. However, the few viewers in the market's eastern portion who watched WFXI were asked to rescan their sets in order to continue watching Fox.

On October 6, 2017, Cunningham Broadcasting requested the cancellation of the WFXI license.
