= WCTI-TV =

Television station in New Bern, North Carolina

- New Bern–Greenville–Washington–; Jacksonville, North Carolina; United States
- City: New Bern, North Carolina
- Channels: Digital: 10 (VHF); Virtual: 12
- Branding: News 12 Now; Fox Eastern Carolina (12.2)

Programming
- Affiliations: 12.1: ABC; 12.2: Fox; for others, see § Subchannels

Ownership
- Owner: Sinclair Broadcast Group; (WCTI Licensee, LLC)
- Sister stations: WYDO

History
- First air date: September 7, 1963
- Former call signs: WNBE-TV (1963–1970); WCTI-TV (1970–1982); WCTI (1982–1983)
- Former channel numbers: Analog: 12 (VHF, 1963–2009); Digital: 48 (UHF, 2000–2009), 12 (VHF, 2009–2020)
- Call sign meaning: former owner Continental Television, Inc.

Technical information
- Licensing authority: FCC
- Facility ID: 18334
- ERP: 34.2 kW
- HAAT: 599.1 m (1,966 ft)
- Transmitter coordinates: 35°6′16″N 77°20′11″W

Links
- Public license information: Public file; LMS
- Website: wcti12.com

WCTI-TV (channel 12) is a television station licensed to New Bern, North Carolina, United States, serving as the ABC and Fox affiliate for Eastern North Carolina. It is owned by Sinclair Broadcast Group alongside Greenville-licensed WYDO (channel 14). The two stations share studios on Glenburnie Drive in New Bern; WCTI-TV's transmitter is located north of Trenton along NC 41.

== History ==
Nathan Frank, a businessman from Henderson, had filed an application for channel 13 in New Bern in 1954. However, final approval was delayed for almost seven years due to numerous challenges. The Army, Navy and Air Force were concerned that the proposed 771-foot (235 m) tower on Glenburnie Drive would interfere with the operations of the numerous military installations located in Eastern North Carolina. Several commercial airlines and pilot associations also expressed concerns about the tower.

A new problem arose in 1958, when the Federal Communications Commission (FCC) dropped in a channel 13 allocation in Hampton, Virginia, to give the Hampton Roads area a third VHF station; WVEC-TV moved there from channel 15 shortly afterward. To alleviate concerns about short-spacing, the channel 13 allocation for New Bern was moved to channel 12. Almost immediately, WRVA-TV in Richmond, Virginia (now WWBT), raised concerns of its own about short-spacing. All objections were eventually overcome by 1961, and the station went on the air on September 7, 1963, as WNBE-TV (for "New Bern"). Frank sold the station to Continental in May, 1970 for $960,000, quite possibly the last VHF to sell for less than $1,000,000. The call letters were changed to the current WCTI-TV in 1970, and the station would activate a 1,000-foot (305 m) tower at full VHF high-band power, off NC 58 south of Trenton. The station has been an ABC affiliate since its inception. When it signed on, Greenville–Washington–New Bern became one of the smallest markets in the country with three commercial network affiliates. Continental Television sold the station to Malrite Communications in 1976.

In 1980, WCTI erected a 2,000-foot (610 m) tower north of Trenton. The new tower expanded the station's secondary coverage as far east as the Outer Banks, as far south as Wilmington and as far west as the Triangle (including Rocky Mount and much of eastern Raleigh). The station's original tower at its New Bern studios is still used as a backup. Malrite sold the station to Heritage Broadcasting in 1983. The 1,000-foot tower south of Trenton that the station had used prior to their move to the new site on NC 41 now holds the antenna for WSFL-FM (106.5). Heritage Broadcasting sold WCTI to Diversified Communications in 1986. In 1993, Lamco Communications bought the station. It was sold to Bluestone Television in 2001. In 2007, Bluestone merged with Bonten Media Group.

On November 6 of that year, it was announced that the FCC approved the sale of certain WFXI/WYDO assets by Piedmont Television to the Bonten Media Group. As part of the deal, WFXI moved from its longtime home on Arendell Street (US 70) in Morehead City to WCTI's facilities in New Bern. In 2000, WCTI launched the first over-the-air digital station in the market on UHF channel 48. A high-definition feed was launched on DirecTV on January 30, 2009. It is also available on satellite through Dish Network. WCTI's broadcasts became digital-only, effective June 12, 2009.

On April 21, 2017, Sinclair announced its intent to purchase the Bonten stations for $240 million. The sale was completed on September 1.

On September 13, 2018, Hurricane Florence forced WCTI to evacuate its building as flood waters continued to rise. For the duration of the storm, WCTI simulcast coverage from Sinclair sister station and fellow ABC affiliate WPDE-TV in Myrtle Beach, South Carolina. By September 16, floodwaters had receded to the point that initial cleanup efforts began.

== News operation ==
In terms of Nielsen ratings, eastern North Carolina is usually not very competitive during sweeps periods. Historically, NBC affiliate WITN-TV (channel 7) has generally traded the highest viewership crown with WCTI and CBS affiliate WNCT-TV (channel 9). In July 2008, WNCT became the most watched television station in the market after taking first place weeknights at 6 and 11. However, since then, that station has fallen to third place weeknights at 6. As of May 2010, WITN has won the sign-on-to-sign-off honors for two consecutive ratings periods. More specifically, it won all time periods except for the weekday noon news.

In January 2008, after becoming a sister station to WFXI/WYDO, WCTI began repeating its nightly 6 o'clock show later in the evening at 10 on the Fox stations. It would not be until the month's end when a new live, nightly prime time newscast (produced by WCTI) debuted on WFXI/WYDO. Known as Fox Eastern Carolina News at 10, the show can be seen for an hour on weeknights and a half-hour on weekends. WNCT offers another newscast at 10 on its CW-affiliated subchannel. Unlike the WFXI/WYDO weeknight program, WNCT's prime time broadcast only airs for thirty minutes each night. As part of debuting the WCTI-produced newscast, WFXI/WYDO introduced an updated graphics package and news music theme licensed for use from News Corporation Digital Media and modified from Fox owned-and-operated stations.

On June 27, 2010, WCTI became the area's first television outlet to upgrade its local news production to high definition (the nightly news on WFXI/WYDO was included in the change at that point). On August 15, 2011, WCTI launched a new 5:30 p.m. newscast. With this newest addition, WCTI and sister stations WFXI/WYDO now offer over thirty hours of local news per week. The station does not currently operate a sports department. In addition to its main studios, WCTI operates bureaus in Jacksonville (on South Marine Boulevard/US 17 BUS) and Winterville (on Old Tar Road covering Greenville).

== Subchannels ==
The station's signal is multiplexed:

Subchannels of WCTI-TV
| Channel | Res. | Short name | Programming |
|---|---|---|---|
| 12.1 | 720p | WCTI-HD | ABC |
| 12.2 | 720p | FOX | Fox |
| 12.3 | 480i | Comet | Comet (4:3) |
| 12.4 | 480i | TCN | True Crime Network (4:3) |

Until September 18, 2006, WCTI-DT3 was a UPN affiliate with the branding "UPN 48" (taken from WCTI's physical digital channel number). When UPN and The WB merged into The CW on that date, WNCT-TV chose to carry the network on a new second digital subchannel, replacing WB outlet "WGWB". After losing the UPN affiliation, WCTI-DT3 became an independent station known as "ENC-TV". ENC-TV was on DT2 from its launch until WCTI's switch to digital in June 2009 when it moved to DT3. At one point, ENC-TV even maintained a website at enc.tv but this was eventually abandoned.

In late summer 2009, WCTI-DT3 began to add programming from This TV, eventually becoming a full-time affiliate. On November 1, 2013, the This TV affiliation was dropped in favor of the Movies! network. On August 23, 2011, Disney-ABC Television Group announced WCTI would carry Live Well Network as part of an affiliation agreement with Bonten Media Group; the network was seen on subchannel 12.2. In February 2015, LWN was replaced with Decades.
