= Sainte Partners II, L.P. =

American media company

Sainte Partners II, L.P. (also known as Sainte Television Group) was a broadcast company based in Modesto, California. The company's founder was country-western performer Chester Smith and his wife Naomi.

== Stations previously owned by Sainte ==
- KCSO-LD Telemundo 33 (Sacramento), now owned by NBCUniversal
- KFBI-LD my48 MyNetworkTV (Medford), now owned by Marquee Broadcasting
- KMCW-LP Telemundo 14 (Medford)
- KVIQ CBS 14 (Eureka), now owned by Marquee Broadcasting
- KCVU 20 (Paradise–Chico–Redding) & KBVU 28 (Eureka), both are owned by Cunningham Broadcasting and operated by the Sinclair Broadcast Group
- KRVU-LD/KZVU-LD (Redding/Chico), now owned by the Sinclair Broadcast Group
- KUCO-LP Univision 27 (Chico), now owned by the Sinclair Broadcast Group
- KXVU-LD Telemundo 17 (Chico), now owned by the Sinclair Broadcast Group
- KKTF-LD Telefutura 30 (Chico), now owned by the Sinclair Broadcast Group
- KUVU-LP CW (Eureka) (Now KECA-LD), now owned by the Sinclair Broadcast Group

== Death of Chester Smith ==
The Sacramento Bee and Chico Enterprise Record have both reported that Chester Smith, founder of Sainte Partners, died on August 8, 2008, at Stanford Medical Center in Palo Alto, California at age 78. He is survived by his second wife Ann and three daughters.
