= Vyve Broadband =

American telecommunications company

Vyve Broadband Logo

Vyve Broadband is an American cable television, telephone and internet service provider with systems in various portions of the United States. It currently owns and operates smaller-market cable systems in Alabama, California, Georgia, Idaho, Kansas, Nebraska, North Carolina, Louisiana, South Carolina, Tennessee, Texas, Washington and Wyoming. On November 13, 2018, Vyve Broadband acquired Seattle, Washington-based Northland Communications.

== Corporate officers ==
=== Northland Communications ===
Northland Communications Logo

John S. Whetzell

John S. Whetzell was the founder, and Chairman since December 1984, of Northland Communications Corporation — which was a General Partner of Northland Cable Properties Eight LP. He has been a Director of Northland Communications Corporation and Northland Telecommunications Corporation since March 1982. He was formerly Chief Executive Officer of Northland Telecommunications Corporation from March 1982 to May 2014, and as a Director of Northland Cable Television Inc.

His undergraduate degree is in economics from George Washington University, and he has an MBA degree from New York University. Whetzell has been involved with the cable television industry for over 29 years.

He first became involved in the cable television industry when he served as the Chief Economist of the Cable Television Bureau of the Federal Communications Commission (FCC) from May 1974 to February 1979. He provided economic studies to support the deregulation of cable television both in federal and state arenas. He participated in the formulation of accounting standards for the industry and assisted the FCC in negotiating and developing the pole attachment rate formula for cable television.

Between March 1979 and February 1982, he was in charge of the Ernst & Whinney national cable television consulting services.

Gary Jones

Gary Jones served as the Chief Executive Officer and Chairman of Northland Cable Television Inc.

=== Vyve Broadband ===
- Andy Parrott, President & Chief Executive Officer
- Ed Butler, Chief Commercial Officer
- Marie Censoplano, Chief Legal Officer & Senior Vice President, Content Acquisition
- Daniel White, Senior Vice President, Financial Planning
- Steve Kaiser, Senior Vice President, IT
- Melanie Hannasch, Senior Vice President, Customer Experience
- Angela Conklin, Senior Vice President, Human Resources

== Areas served by Vyve ==
Arkansas
- De Queen, AR
- Mena, AR
- Monticello, AR
- Warren, AR

California

- Coarsegold, CA
- Mount Shasta, CA
- Oakhurst, CA
- Yreka, CA

Georgia

- Brooklet, GA
- Douglas, GA
- Lyons, GA
- Nicholls, GA
- Statesboro, GA
- Swainsboro, GA
- Vidalia, GA
- Waycross, GA

Idaho

- Sagle, ID
- Sandpoint, ID

Kansas

- Abilene, KS
- Atchison, KS
- Fort Riley, KS
- Hays, KS
- Ottawa, KS

Louisiana

- Dequincy, LA
- Kinder, LA
- Lake Charles, LA
- Sulphur, LA
- Westlake, LA

North Carolina

- Spindale, NC
- Brevard, NC
- Ellenboro, NC
- Forest City, NC
- Franklin, NC
- Hendersonville, NC
- Mooresboro, NC
- Rutherfordton, NC

Nebraska

- Columbus, NE
- Schuyler, NE

Oklahoma

- Atoka, OK
- Bristow, OK
- Checotah, OK
- Collinsville, OK
- Durant, OK
- Eufaula, OK
- Fort Gibson, OK
- Guymon, OK
- Holdenville, OK
- Hugo, OK
- Inola, OK
- Kingston, OK
- McAlester, OK
- McLoud, OK
- Pryor, OK
- Sapulpa, OK
- Seminole, OK
- Shawnee, OK
- Skiatook, OK
- Stigler, OK
- Tecumseh, OK
- Wagoner, OK

South Carolina

- Central, SC
- Clemson, SC
- Edgefield, SC
- Greenwood, SC
- Liberty, SC
- Pendleton, SC
- Pickens, SC
- Saluda, SC
- Seneca, SC
- Walhalla, SC
- Westminster, SC

Tennessee

- New Tazewell, TN
- Tazewell, TN

Texas

- Athens, TX
- Bowie, TX
- Bridgeport, TX
- Burnet, TX
- Corsicana, TX
- Crockett, TX
- Dalhart, TX
- Decatur, TX
- Dublin, TX
- Fairfield, TX
- Hillsboro, TX
- Kingsland, TX
- Madisonville, TX
- Marble Falls, TX
- Mexia, TX
- Mineral Wells, TX
- New Boston, TX
- Paris, TX
- Perryton, TX
- Pottsboro, TX
- Stephenville, TX
- Whitney, TX

Washington

- Ephrata, WA
- Moses Lake, WA
- Othello, WA
- Quincy, WA

Wyoming

- Douglas, WY
- Torrington, WY
