= KECA-LD =

Television station in Eureka, California

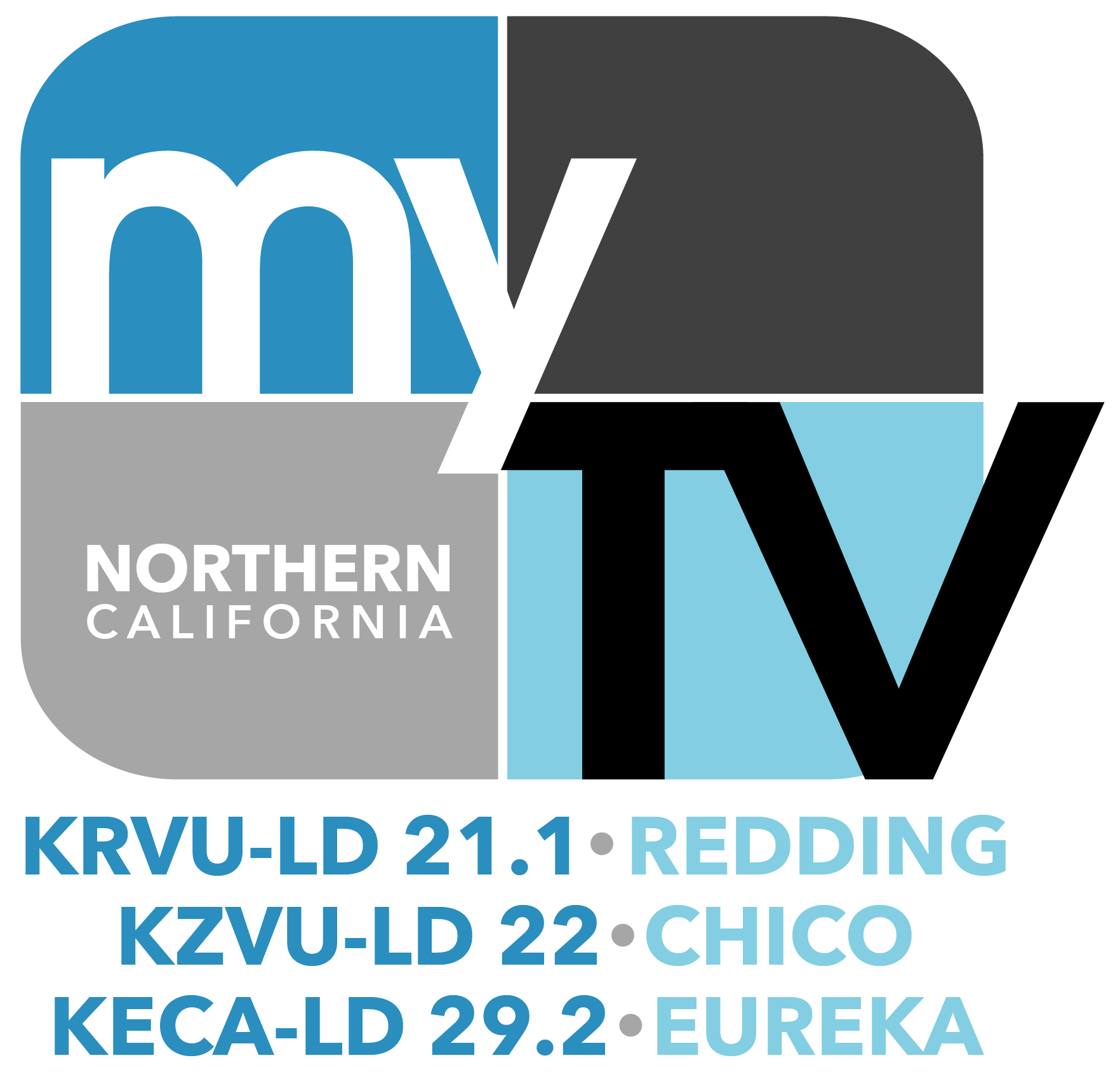
- Eureka, California; United States
- Channels: Digital: 29 (UHF); Virtual: 29
- Branding: Eureka CW 29; myTV Northern California (29.2)

Programming
- Affiliations: 29.1: CW+; 29.2: Independent with MyNetworkTV

Ownership
- Owner: Sinclair Broadcast Group; (Sinclair-California Licensee, LLC)

History
- First air date: 2014
- Former call signs: K67GU (1995−2010); K29IR (2010−2012); KECA-LP (2012−2013)
- Call sign meaning: Eureka, California

Technical information
- Licensing authority: FCC
- Facility ID: 26852
- Class: LD
- ERP: 15 kW
- HAAT: 460.5 m (1,511 ft)
- Transmitter coordinates: 40°43′38.3″N 123°58′21.1″W

Links
- Public license information: LMS

KECA-LD (channel 29) is a low-power television station in Eureka, California, United States, affiliated with The CW Plus and MyNetworkTV. It is owned by Sinclair Broadcast Group alongside ABC/Fox affiliate KAEF-TV (channel 23), KBVU (channel 28), and low-power Univision affiliate KEUV-LD (channel 35). The four stations share studios on Sixth Street in downtown Eureka; KECA-LD's transmitter is located along Barry Road southeast of the city.

== History ==
The CW and MyNetworkTV first appeared in Eureka respectively on KUVU-LP (channel 9) and KEMY-LP (channel 33), both analog-only stations and the latter a semi-satellite of KRVU-LP in Redding, as part of the Eureka Broadcast Group, which owned CBS affiliate KVIQ and several other stations with affiliations to Fox, UPN, The WB and others. KUVU and KEMY were dissolved in 2014 and Bonten Media Group, who had purchased most of the Eureka Broadcast Group stations including KUVU and KEMY in 2012, launched KECA as a digital replacement for the two defunct stations in the Eureka market.

On April 21, 2017, Sinclair Broadcast Group purchased KECA as part of a four-station deal. The sale was completed September 1.

In June 2020, Sinclair upgraded the station's facilities to HD.

== Subchannels ==
The station's signal is multiplexed:

Subchannels of KECA-LD
Channel	Res.	Short name	Programming
29.1	720p	KECA-LD	The CW Plus
29.2	720p	MYTV	Independent with MyNetworkTV
