= Chester Smith =

American musician and broadcaster (1930–2008)

Chester Smith (March 29, 1930 – August 8, 2008) was an American country-western musician and business entrepreneur.

== Early life and radio career ==
Smith was born in Durant, Oklahoma, on March 29, 1930. He and his family relocated to Tranquility, California, just outside of Fresno in 1935 after escaping the dust bowl. He began singing on KMJ-AM Radio in Fresno with Gene Autry at age 9. After moving to Modesto in 1942, he found his way into the radio broadcasting business with several stations in the central California valley starting with KTRB-AM at age 12 and remaining there for 16 years. He dropped out of high school and started his own program on January 3, 1947. His life was immortalized in song with the catchy tune "The Ballad of Chester Smith", which he wrote and performed. On October 17, 1963, his first owned radio station KLOC-AM 920 hit the air in Ceres, California.

== Television entrepreneurship ==
He started his television career at Sacramento television station KOVR. He hosted a music variety show that aired for thirteen weeks and featured local artists, a gospel quartet and a relatively unknown singer by the name of Merle Haggard. He also featured several celebrity guests before starting KLOC-AM. On August 26, 1966, Smith started his own television station KLOC-TV in Modesto with his first wife Naomi. It was the first 5,000,000-watt television UHF station in California and originally operated as a full-service entertainment station, then simulcast the co-owned radio station with the same call letters for several years before affiliating with the Spanish International Network in 1972 (SIN, now Univision, purchased the station from Smith in 1997). In 1981, he launched a second Spanish-language station KCBA (now a FOX affiliate) in Salinas, California. He also started the first Spanish-language television station in Sacramento, KCSO, which has been an affiliate of Telemundo since it hit the air in 1999.

He is the founder of the broadcast company Sainte Partners II, L.P. (also known as Sainte Television Group) and began the largest privately owned broadcast company with stations spanning from Bakersfield, California to Medford, Oregon. Sainte sold off all of its stations as of 2014, six years after his death.

== Music career ==
In 1953, Smith signed a Capitol Records recording contract.

In 2002, Smith teamed up with legendary country star Merle Haggard to collaborate on a special CD project called California Blend. The CD featured classic country, western and gospel tunes recorded by several artists. A music video of the song "Wreck on the Highway" filmed and produced in Chico, California, by local station KCVU, a FOX affiliate and would air on a local TV program. The video portrays the aftermath of a drunk driving crash which injures a woman and kills her boyfriend. Merle enters the scene on his tour bus and Chester pulls up in his Rolls-Royce car. The video has since been seen on YouTube.

Three years later in 2005, Smith and his second wife Ann Lesley Smith, teamed up on a new CD project called Captured By Love. Just prior to the CD's release, the couple appeared on the locally produced music program [Real]Music to perform song from the upcoming release and be interviewed by program host Chadd Shotwell.

== Personal life ==
Smith's first marriage of 42 years was to Naomi.

Smith's second marriage, aged 74, was to volunteer prison chaplain and dental hygienist Ann Lesley Smith, aged 47, The couple released the Captured by Love album in 2005.

== Death ==
On August 8, 2008, Chester Smith died of heart failure after a routine trip to Stanford University Medical Center in Palo Alto, California. He is survived by his second wife of three years, Ann Lesley Smith, three daughters from his first marriage of 42 years to Naomi Smith: Laura, Lorna, and Roxanne, as well as 10 grandchildren. He was buried at Lakewood Memorial Park Cemetery in Hughson, California. Several years after his death, Sainte Partners sold off all of their assets and shut down operations for good.
