= KAEF-TV =

Television station in Arcata, California

Semi-satellite of KRCR-TV, Redding–Chico, California

- Arcata–Eureka–Fortuna, California; United States
- City: Arcata, California
- Channels: Digital: 22 (UHF); Virtual: 23
- Branding: ABC 23; Fox 28 (23.2)

Programming
- Affiliations: 23.1: ABC; 23.2: Fox; 23.3: Comet

Ownership
- Owner: Sinclair Broadcast Group; (Sinclair Media Licensee, LLC)
- Sister stations: KBVU, KECA-LD, KEUV-LD

History
- First air date: August 1, 1987
- Former call signs: KREQ (1987–1989); KAEF (1989–2009)
- Former channel number: Analog: 23 (UHF, 1987–2009)
- Former affiliations: Fox (primary 1987–1989, secondary 1989–1994); Dark (1989)
- Call sign meaning: Arcata, Eureka, Fortuna

Technical information
- Licensing authority: FCC
- Facility ID: 8263
- ERP: 45 kW
- HAAT: 549.9 m (1,804 ft)
- Transmitter coordinates: 40°43′38.3″N 123°58′21.1″W
- Translator(s): see § Translators

Links
- Public license information: Public file; LMS
- Website: krcrtv.com/north-coast-news/eureka-local-news

KAEF-TV (channel 23) is a television station licensed to Arcata, California, United States, serving as the ABC and Fox affiliate for the Eureka area. It is owned by Sinclair Broadcast Group alongside Eureka-licensed KBVU (channel 28) and two low-power stations: dual CW/MyNetworkTV affiliate KECA-LD (channel 29) and Univision affiliate KEUV-LD (channel 35). The four stations share studios on Sixth Street in downtown Eureka; KAEF-TV's transmitter is located along Barry Road southeast of the city.

Although identifying as a separate station in its own right, KAEF is considered a semi-satellite of KRCR-TV (channel 7) in Redding–Chico. As such, it clears all network programming as provided through its parent station but airs a separate offering of syndicated programming; there are also separate local newscasts, commercial inserts and legal station identifications. Master control and most internal operations are based at the studios for KRCR-TV and KCVU in Redding.

== History ==
KAEF began broadcasting August 1, 1987, as KREQ, a Fox affiliate owned by Mad River Broadcasting. During this period, the station lost money on a monthly basis, in part because KREQ was, for all intents and purposes, a UHF independent station (at the time, Fox only offered a nightly late night program and weekend prime time programming, and would not air an entire week's worth of programming until 1993) in a small market dominated by two VHF network affiliates, NBC affiliate KIEM-TV (channel 3) and CBS affiliate KVIQ (channel 6).

In June 1988, Mad River put KREQ up for sale; in 1989, it sold the station to California Oregon Broadcasting (COBI), owner of KRCR-TV. COBI already owned two radio stations in Eureka, KFLI (790 AM, now KEJY) and KEKA-FM (101.5), which were sold off as a condition of the purchase of channel 23. Mad River took KREQ off the air, citing financial problems, on April 30, 1989; that October, COBI returned channel 23 to the air as KAEF (Arcata–Eureka–Fortuna), an ABC affiliate and semi-satellite of KRCR-TV. Prior to 1989, ABC programming was limited to off-hours clearances on KIEM and KVIQ; through KRCR, KAEF still offered some Fox programming in off-hours until KBVU signed on in 1994.

California Oregon Broadcasting sold KAEF, along with KRCR-TV and its other satellite station, KFWU in Fort Bragg (now KQSL in Cloverdale), to Lamco Communications for $11.925 million in 1995. Lamco sold its stations, including KAEF and KRCR, to BlueStone Television in 2004; BlueStone, in turn, was acquired by Bonten Media Group for $230 million in 2007. KAEF added the "-TV" suffix to its call sign on July 1, 2009.

KAEF-TV became a sister station to Fox affiliate KBVU (channel 28) in 2012, after Bonten (via KRCR-TV) took over the sales operation for KBVU in August and the entire station in December through a local marketing agreement with Esteem Broadcasting, which has functioned as a shell corporation for Bonten since 2008.

=== Disputes with Dish Network ===
Dish Network and KAEF, via KRCR, had been at odds for quite sometime regarding carriage of the station on the satellite system. KRCR was asking for reimbursement and made their feeling public. As a result, on December 8, 2013, Dish halted carrying KRCR on their system. General manager Andrew Stewart went to the internet at the station's website to share his frustrations with the viewers and called out Dish Network. On January 12, 2014, Dish restored KRCR and KAEF and associated stations to its lineup. On January 17, 2017, KAEF was once again removed from Dish Network's lineup as part of a new dispute. It was returned to Dish at a later date.

=== Sale to Sinclair ===
On April 21, 2017, Sinclair Broadcast Group announced its purchase of KAEF-TV as part of its $240 million acquisition of Bonten Media Group; the purchase also gave it control of KBVU, KECA-LD, and KEUV-LP. The sale was completed on September 1.

On December 9, 2025, the Fox affiliation was moved from KBVU to KAEF-TV's second subchannel, while KBVU's main channel flipped to Roar.

== Programming ==
KAEF airs much of the same programming as KRCR, sometimes at different times. There are also some programs that only air on KAEF while some are only seen on KRCR, as the stations are in different media markets.

=== News operation ===
KAEF presently broadcasts 15 hours of newscasts each week (with three hours each weekday). KAEF produces five of those hours at its Eureka studios; the morning newscast, Daybreak, is simulcast from KRCR-TV in Redding. There are currently no newscasts on the weekends.

KAEF discontinued its original news operation on February 6, 2001, due to low ratings; ABC 23 News had generally been the third-ranked news operation in the Eureka market. Following the cancellation, the only Eureka-specific news content on the station was a weather segment produced by KRCR-TV. Local news returned to KAEF-TV on November 17, 2014; the news operation also produces a prime time newscast for the Fox subchannel.

== Technical information ==
=== Subchannels ===
The station's signal is multiplexed:

Subchannels of KAEF-TV
| Channel | Res. | Short name | Programming |
|---|---|---|---|
| 23.1 | 720p | KAEF-DT | ABC |
| 23.2 | 720p | | Fox |
| 23.3 | 480i | Movies! | Comet (4:3) |

On August 23, 2011, Disney-ABC Television Group announced that KAEF would carry Live Well Network as part of an affiliation agreement with Bonten Media Group; the network was added to a new third subchannel. Live Well Network was replaced by Movies! on November 18, 2013, only for it to be replaced by Comet on September 1, 2022.

=== Analog-to-digital conversion ===
KAEF-TV shut down its analog signal, over UHF channel 23, on June 12, 2009, the official date on which full-power television stations in the United States transitioned from analog to digital broadcasts under federal mandate. The station's digital signal remained on its pre-transition UHF channel 22, using virtual channel 23.

=== Translators ===
- K20CN-D Fortuna–Rio Dell
- K21OO-D South Eureka–Loleta
