= KBVU (TV) =

Television station in Eureka, California

Semi-satellite of KCVU, Paradise–Chico–Redding, California
- Eureka, California; United States
- Channels: Digital: 28 (UHF); Virtual: 28

Programming
- Affiliations: 28.1: Roar; for others, see § Technical information and subchannels

Ownership
- Owner: Sinclair Broadcast Group; (Sinclair Media Licensee, LLC)
- Sister stations: KAEF-TV

History
- Founded: July 10, 1991
- First air date: July 20, 1994
- Former call signs: KZJA (CP)
- Former channel numbers: Analog: 29 (UHF, 1994–2008)
- Former affiliations: Fox (1994–2025); UPN (secondary, 1995–1997); The WB (secondary, 1995–1998)
- Call sign meaning: Best VU (as in "view")

Technical information
- Licensing authority: FCC
- Facility ID: 58618
- ERP: 50 kW; 30 kW (STA)
- HAAT: 512 m (1,680 ft)
- Transmitter coordinates: 40°43′38.3″N 123°58′21.1″W; 40°43′41.9″N 123°58′21.5″W; (STA)

Links
- Public license information: Public file; LMS

KBVU (channel 28) is a television station in Eureka, California, United States, airing programming from the digital multicast network Roar. It is owned by Sinclair Broadcast Group alongside Arcata-licensed ABC/Fox affiliate KAEF-TV (channel 23) and two low-power stations: dual CW/MyNetworkTV affiliate KECA-LD (channel 29) and Univision affiliate KEUV-LD (channel 35). The four stations share studios on Sixth Street in downtown Eureka; KBVU's transmitter is located along Barry Road southeast of Eureka.

Although it identifies as a station in its own right, KBVU is considered a semi-satellite of KCVU (channel 20) in Paradise–Chico–Redding, with the only difference between the two stations being the hourly station identification as Roar uses a master default schedule.

== History ==
KBVU signed on the air as a Fox affiliate on July 20, 1994. Prior to its launch, Fox's programming was only available via a secondary affiliation with ABC affiliates KAEF and KFWU (both satellites of KRCR-TV), while out-of-market affiliates KTVU and KTXL were imported by some cable providers.

On April 21, 2017, Sinclair Broadcast Group purchased KAEF and the LMA with KBVU as part of a four-station deal. The sale was completed on September 1.

Sinclair filed to buy KBVU outright from Cunningham in August 2025, following a decision by the United States Court of Appeals for the Eighth Circuit that struck down limitations on ownership of two of the four highest-rated TV stations in a market. On December 9, 2025, the Fox affiliation was moved to KAEF-TV's second subchannel, while KBVU's main channel flipped to Roar. The sale was completed on March 1, 2026.

== Technical information and subchannels ==
The station's digital signal is multiplexed:

Subchannels of KBVU
Channel	Res.	Short name	Programming
28.1	720p	KBVU-HD	Roar
28.2	480i	COMET	Comet
28.3	480i	CHARGE	Charge!
28.6	480i	STADIUM	The Nest

=== Analog-to-digital conversion ===
KBVU shut down its analog signal, over UHF channel 29, on December 22, 2008, along with KCVU, due to financial hardship. The station's digital signal broadcasts on its pre-transition UHF channel 28.
