= List of television stations in Washington (state) =

This is a list of broadcast television stations that are licensed in the U.S. state of Washington.

== Full-power ==
- Stations are arranged by media market served and channel position.

Full-power television stations in Washington
Media market	Station	Channel	Primary affiliation(s)	Notes	Refs
Centralia	KCKA	15	PBS	(Note: Satellite of KBTC-TV.)	
Kennewick–Pasco–Richland	KEPR-TV	19	CBS, The CW on 19.2, Fox on 19.3	(Note: Semi-satellite of KIMA-TV.)	
Kennewick–Pasco–Richland	KNDU	25	NBC	(Note: Licensed to Richland, Washington.) (Note: Semi-satellite of KNDO.)	
Kennewick–Pasco–Richland	KTNW	31	PBS	(Note: Satellite of KWSU-TV.)	
Kennewick–Pasco–Richland	KVEW	42	ABC, MyNetworkTV on 42.5		
Pullman	KWSU-TV	10	PBS		
Seattle–Tacoma	KOMO-TV	4	ABC		
Seattle–Tacoma	KING-TV	5	NBC		
Seattle–Tacoma	KIRO-TV	7	CBS		
Seattle–Tacoma	KCTS-TV	9	PBS		
Seattle–Tacoma	KSTW	11	Independent		
Seattle–Tacoma	KCPQ	13	Fox		
Seattle–Tacoma	KONG	16	Independent	(Note: Licensed to Everett, Washington.)	
Seattle–Tacoma	KTBW-TV	20	TBN		
Seattle–Tacoma	KZJO	22	MyNetworkTV, Fox on 22.2		
Seattle–Tacoma	KBTC-TV	28	PBS		
Seattle–Tacoma	KWPX-TV	33	Ion Television	(Note: Licensed to Bellevue, Washington.)	
Seattle–Tacoma	KFFV	44	MeTV		
Seattle–Tacoma	KUNS-TV	51	The CW		
Seattle–Tacoma	KWDK	56	Daystar		
Spokane	KREM	2	CBS		
Spokane	KXLY-TV	4	ABC		
Spokane	KHQ-TV	6	NBC		
Spokane	KSPS-TV	7	PBS		
Spokane	KSKN	22	The CW		
Spokane	KQUP	24	Independent	(Note: Licensed to Pullman, Washington.)	
Spokane	KAYU-TV	28	Fox, MyNetworkTV on 28.2		
Spokane	KGPX-TV	34	Ion Television		
Yakima	KNDO	23	NBC		
Yakima	KIMA-TV	29	CBS, The CW on 29.2, Fox on 29.3		
Yakima	KAPP	35	ABC, MyNetworkTV on 35.5		
Yakima	KYVE	47	PBS	(Note: Satellite of KCTS-TV.)	
~Portland, OR	KPDX	49	MyNetworkTV	(Note: Licensed to Vancouver, Washington.)	
~Vancouver, BC	KVOS-TV	12	Univision, MeTV on 12.3	(Note: Licensed to Bellingham, Washington.)	
~Vancouver, BC	KBCB	24	TCT		

== Low-power ==
Low-power television stations in Washington
Media market	Station	Channel	Primary affiliation(s)	Notes	Refs
Ellensburg	K25FP-D	25	3ABN		
Ellensburg	K27OO-D	39	TBN		
Kennewick–Pasco–Richland	K06QD-D	6	Silent		
Kennewick–Pasco–Richland	KVVK-CD	15	Univision		
Kennewick–Pasco–Richland	K28QK-D	22	Various		
Kennewick–Pasco–Richland	K33EJ-D	33	3ABN	(Note: Licensed to Walla Walla, Washington.)	
Kennewick–Pasco–Richland	K36EW-D	36	Religious independent	(Note: Licensed to College Place, Washington.)	
Kennewick–Pasco–Richland	KWWO-LD	47	Religious independent		
Kennewick–Pasco–Richland	KRLB-LD	49	Religious independent		
Kennewick–Pasco–Richland	K31KW-D	54	3ABN		
Moses Lake	K34ND-D	39	3ABN		
Pullman	K36NZ-D	36	3ABN	(Note: Licensed to Clarkston, Washington.)	
Pullman	KVBI-CD	42	Silent		
Seattle–Tacoma	KYMU-LD	6	Various		
Seattle–Tacoma	KQAH-LD	10	Independent	(Note: Licensed to Maltby, Washington.)	
Seattle–Tacoma	K20NF-D	23	Silent		
Seattle–Tacoma	KRUM-LD	24	TCT		
Seattle–Tacoma	KUSE-LD	46	Various		
Spokane	K29NM-D	29	HSN		
Spokane	KDYS-LD	32	Telemundo		
Tonasket	K26GV-D	26	3ABN	(Note: Licensed to Omak, Washington.)	
Wenatchee	K36KY-D	36	3ABN		
Wenatchee	K11EZ-D	51	[Blank]	(Note: Licensed to Cashmere, Washington.)	
Wenatchee	K22MO-D	21	3ABN	(Note: Licensed to Pateros, Washington.)	
Yakima	KUNW-CD	2	Univision		
Yakima	K23JU-D	5	3ABN	(Note: Licensed to Prosser, Washington.)	
Yakima	K06PU-D	6	Silent		
Yakima	K15KC-D	15	Independent, NASA TV on .2 and .3		
Yakima	K23PG-D	16	Silent		
Yakima	K19JX-D	19	NTD America		
Yakima	K20LQ-D	20	[Blank]		
Yakima	K28QL-D	28	Silent		
Yakima	KYPK-LD	32	TeleXitos		
Yakima	KWYT-LD	36	Estrella TV		
Yakima	KDHW-CD	45	TBN		
Yakima	K25PV-D	51	3ABN		

== Translators ==
Television station translators in Washington
Media market	Station	Channel	Translating	Notes	Refs
Centralia–Chehalis	K17NX-D	13	KCPQ		
Centralia–Chehalis	K15MI-D	22	KZJO		
Ellensburg	K32IG-D	23	KNDO		
Ellensburg	K23NE-D	29	KIMA-TV		
Ellensburg	K20JL-D	35	KAPP		
Ellensburg	K26NF-D	41	KFFX-TV		
Ellensburg	K17IL-D	47	KYVE		
Kennewick–Pasco–Richland	K21OT-D	4	KWYT-LD		
Kennewick–Pasco–Richland	K20KG-D	5	K05RG-D		
Kennewick–Pasco–Richland	KBWU-LD	11	KFFX-TV		
Kennewick–Pasco–Richland	K32KY-D	32	KYPK-LD		
Kennewick–Pasco–Richland	K21JQ-D	36	K36EW-D		
Kennewick–Pasco–Richland	K31KL-D	36	K36EW-D		
Longview	K27NZ-D	49	KPDX		
Moses Lake	K12RD-D	2; 4; 6	KREM; KXLY-TV; KHQ-TV	(Note: Licensed to Coulee City, Washington.)	
Moses Lake	KUMN-LD	4; 7	KXLY-TV; KSPS-TV		
Moses Lake	K10RA-D	7	KSPS-TV		
Moses Lake	K11WY-D	28	KAYU-TV		
Moses Lake	K31KT-D	31	K05RG-D		
Pullman	K26NM-D	4	KXLY-TV		
Seattle–Tacoma	K18NH-D	7	KIRO-TV	(Note: Licensed to Puyallup, Washington.)	
Seattle–Tacoma	K18NI-D	7	KIRO-TV	(Note: Licensed to Point Pulley, Washington.)	
Seattle–Tacoma	K26IC-D	7	KIRO-TV	(Note: Licensed to Bremerton, Washington.)	
Seattle–Tacoma	K26OZ-D	7	KIRO-TV		
Seattle–Tacoma	K29ED-D	22	KZJO		
Seattle–Tacoma	K35PB-D	10	KQAH-LD		
Spokane	KXMN-LD	4	KXLY-TV		
Spokane	K09UP-D	7; 28	KSPS-TV; KAYU-TV	(Note: Licensed to Colville, Washington.)	
Spokane	KHBA-LD	35	K19IP-D		
Spokane	KQUP-LD	47	KQUP		
Tonasket	K36PH-D	2	KREM	(Note: Licensed to Methow, Washington.)	
Tonasket	K10BD-D	2	KREM	(Note: Licensed to Winthrop, Washington.)	
Tonasket	K08CW-D	4	KXLY-TV	(Note: Licensed to Malott, Washington.)	
Tonasket	K08CX-D	4	KXLY-TV		
Tonasket	K10DM-D	4	KXLY-TV	(Note: Licensed to Riverside, Washington.)	
Tonasket	K12BA-D	4	KXLY-TV		
Tonasket	K19JC-D	4	KXLY-TV	(Note: Licensed to Mazama, Washington.)	
Tonasket	K33NM-D	4	KXLY-TV		
Tonasket	K35MN-D	4	KXLY-TV		
Tonasket	K08AY-D	6	KHQ-TV		
Tonasket	K09BI-D	6	KHQ-TV		
Tonasket	K21LD-D	6	KHQ-TV		
Tonasket	K11BM-D	7	KSPS-TV		
Tonasket	K12CV-D	7	KSPS-TV		
Tonasket	K12CW-D	7	KSPS-TV		
Tonasket	K12CX-D	7	KSPS-TV		
Tonasket	K13BA-D	7	KSPS-TV		
Tonasket	K17EV-D	7	KSPS-TV		
Tonasket	K17KR-D	7	KSPS-TV		
Tonasket	K08CY-D	28	KAYU-TV		
Tonasket	K10DK-D	28	KAYU-TV		
Tonasket	K10DL-D	28	KAYU-TV		
Tonasket	K19AU-D	28	KAYU-TV	(Note: Licensed to Omak and Okanogan, Washington.)	
Tonasket	K31AH-D	28	KAYU-TV		
Wenatchee	K12AV-D	2	KREM	(Note: Licensed to Brewster and Pateros, Washington.)	
Wenatchee	K08JP-D	2	KREM	(Note: Licensed to Dryden, Washington.)	
Wenatchee	K10LG-D	4	KXLY-TV		
Wenatchee	K14SF-D	4	KXLY-TV		
Wenatchee	K26IV-D	4	KXLY-TV		
Wenatchee	K30KA-D	4	KXLY-TV		
Wenatchee	K10AP-D	6	KHQ-TV		
Wenatchee	K12LV-D	6	KHQ-TV		
Wenatchee	K07JO-D	7	KSPS-TV	(Note: Licensed to Chelan Butte, Washington.)	
Wenatchee	K09ES-D	7	KSPS-TV		
Wenatchee	K23MU-D	7	KSPS-TV	(Note: Licensed to Bridgeport, Washington.)	
Wenatchee	K32MC-D	7	KSPS-TV	(Note: Licensed to Baker Flats, Washington.)	
Wenatchee	K34NN-D	7	KSPS-TV		
Wenatchee	K14BF-D	13	KCPQ		
Wenatchee	K08AP-D	28	KAYU-TV		
Wenatchee	K28KJ-D	13	KCPQ	(Note: Licensed to Chelan, Washington.)	
Wenatchee	K13ER-D	28	KAYU-TV		
Wenatchee	K24LM-D	28	KAYU-TV		
Wenatchee	K25NY-D	28	KAYU-TV		
Wenatchee	K18AD-D	47	KYVE		
Yakima	K28KW-D	5	K05RG-D	(Note: Licensed to Sunnyside, Washington.)	
Yakima	K13ABZ-D	32	KYPK-LD		
Yakima	K08QZ-D	36	KWYT-LD		
Yakima	KCYU-LD	41	KFFX-TV		
Yakima	K34MZ-D	41	KFFX-TV		
~Astoria, OR	K16LV-D	28	KBTC-TV	(Note: Licensed to Grays River, Washington.)	
~Milton, OR	K14HT-D	42	KVEW		
~The Dalles, OR	K17OY-D	17	KPTV	(Note: Licensed to Centerville, Washington.)	
~The Dalles, OR	K10RV-D	31	KPTV		
~Vancouver, BC	K15MW-D	24	KBCB		
~Vancouver, BC	K18NJ-D	28	KBTC-TV		

== Defunct ==
- KBAS-TV Ephrata (1957–1961)
- KCWK Walla Walla (2001–2008)
- KCWK-LP Yakima (2001–2008)
- KCWT Wenatchee (1984–1993)
- KNBS Walla Walla (1960–1960)
- KPEC-TV Tacoma/Lakewood Center (1960–1975)
- KTRX Kennewick/Pasco (1958)
