= List of Roar affiliates =

The following is a list of affiliates for Roar, a digital subchannel network owned by the Sinclair Broadcast Group.

== Affiliates ==
List of Roar affiliates
Media market	State/District	Station	Channel
Birmingham	Alabama	WTTO	21.4
Mobile	Alabama	WPMI-TV	15
Montgomery	Alabama	WIYC	48.5
Phoenix	Arizona	KSAZ-TV	10.4
Little Rock	Arkansas	KATV	7.4
Bakersfield	California	KBFX-CD	29.2
Eureka	California	KBVU	28
Fresno	California	KFRE-TV	59.3
Los Angeles	California	KTTV	11.3
Redding–Chico	California	KCVU	20
Redding–Chico	California	KUCO-LD	27.3
Sacramento	California	KTXL	40.4
San Francisco	California	KRON-TV	4.4
Denver	Colorado	KDVR	31.3
Denver	Colorado	KTVD	9.7
Fort Collins	Colorado	KFCT	22.3
Hartford–New Haven	Connecticut	WWAX-LD	27.2
Washington	District of Columbia	WJLA-TV	7.4
Washington	District of Columbia	WDCO-CD	10
Washington	District of Columbia	WIAV-CD	58
High Springs–Gainesville	Florida	WNBW-DT	9
Jacksonville	Florida	WTLV	12.4
Miami–Fort Lauderdale	Florida	WBFS-TV	33.6
Tallahassee	Florida	WTLF	24.3
Venice–Tampa–St. Petersburg	Florida	WFTT-TV	62.4
West Palm Beach	Florida	WWHB-CD	48
Albany	Georgia	WFXL	31.2
Atlanta	Georgia	WUPA	69.3
Atlanta	Georgia	WAGA-TV	5.4
Savannah	Georgia	WTGS	28.4
Boise	Idaho	KYUU-LD	35.2
Champaign–Urbana–Danville	Illinois	WICD	15.3
Chicago	Illinois	WFLD	32.4
Peoria–Bloomington–Normal	Illinois	WHOI	19.5
Quincy	Illinois	KHQA-TV	7.4
Springfield–Decatur	Illinois	WICS	20.3
Indianapolis	Indiana	WTTV	4.4
Elkhart–South Bend	Indiana	WSJV	28
Cedar Rapids	Iowa	KFXA	28
Des Moines	Iowa	KDSM-TV	17.4
Sioux City	Iowa	KMEG	14
Sioux City	Iowa	KPTH	44.2
Hutchinson–Wichita	Kansas	KMTW	36
Paducah	Kentucky	WDKA	49.3
New Orleans	Louisiana	WGNO	26.4
Portland	Maine	WGME-TV	13.2
Baltimore	Maryland	WUTB	24
Boston	Massachusetts	WWDP	46
Detroit	Michigan	WKBD-TV	50.4
Flint	Michigan	WEYI-TV	25
Grand Rapids	Michigan	WWMT	3.3
Traverse City–Cadillac	Michigan	WGTU	29.4
Minneapolis–Saint Paul	Minnesota	WUCW	23.4
Jefferson City–Columbia	Missouri	KRCG	13.4
Kansas City	Missouri	WDAF-TV	4.4
St. Louis	Missouri	KDNL-TV	30.2
Butte	Montana	KTVM-TV	6.4
Kearney–Hastings–Grand Island	Nebraska	KHGI-TV	13.3
Lincoln	Nebraska	KFXL-TV	51.2
Omaha	Nebraska	KXVO	15
Las Vegas	Nevada	KSNV	3.2
Reno	Nevada	KRNV-DT	4
Elko	Nevada	KENV-DT	10
Albuquerque	New Mexico	KUPT-LD	16.2
Albuquerque	New Mexico	KASA-TV	33
Albuquerque	New Mexico	KRTN-LD	39.6
Clovis	New Mexico	KVIH-TV	12.4
Albany	New York	WRGB	6.2
Buffalo	New York	WUTV	29.2
New Rochelle	New York	WRNN-TV	48.2
New York City	New York	WNYW	5.4
Rochester	New York	WUHF	31.4
Syracuse	New York	WTVH	5
Greensboro	WXLV-TV	45.2	
Greenville	WYDO	14	
Raleigh–Durham	WLFL	22.3	
Cincinnati	Ohio	WSTR-TV	64.4
Columbus	Ohio	WTTE	28
Dayton	Ohio	WRGT-TV	45
Toledo	Ohio	WNWO-TV	24.4
Oklahoma City	Oklahoma	KOCB	34.2
Tulsa	Oklahoma	KOKI-TV	23
Coos Bay	Oregon	KCBY-TV	11.2
Eugene	Oregon	KVAL-TV	13.2
Medford	Oregon	KTVL	10.4
Portland	Oregon	KUNP	16.4
Roseburg	Oregon	KPIC	4.2
Johnstown	Pennsylvania	WWCP-TV	8.3
Philadelphia	Pennsylvania	KYW-TV	3.4
Pittsburgh	Pennsylvania	WPGH-TV	53.4
Providence	Rhode Island	WLNE-TV	6
Charleston	South Carolina	WTAT-TV	24.5
Columbia	South Carolina	WACH	57.2
Greenville	South Carolina	WMYA-TV	40
Myrtle Beach	South Carolina	WWMB	21
Chattanooga	Tennessee	WTVC	9.3
Johnson City	Tennessee	WEMT	39
Memphis	Tennessee	WQEK-LD	36.4
Nashville	Tennessee	WNAB	58
Abilene	Texas	KTES-LD	40
Amarillo	Texas	KVII-TV	7.4
Austin	Texas	KGBS-CD	19
Beaumont	Texas	KBTV-TV	4
Corpus Christi	Texas	KSCC	38.2
Dallas–Fort Worth	Texas	KTXD-TV	47
El Paso	Texas	KDBC-TV	4.2
Houston	Texas	KHOU	11.5
San Antonio	Texas	KMYS	35
Salt Lake City	Utah	KJZZ-TV	14.3
Lynchburg–Roanoke	Virginia	WSET-TV	13.4
Norfolk–Hampton Roads	Virginia	WTVZ-TV	33.4
Richmond–Petersburg	Virginia	WRLH-TV	35.2
Bellevue–Seattle–Tacoma	Washington	KUNS-TV	51.2
Clarkston–Pullman	Washington	KLEW-TV	3.4
Pasco–Richland–Kennewick	Washington	KFFX-TV	11
Yakima	Washington	KCYU-LD	41
Charleston–Huntington	West Virginia	WVAH-TV	11.5
Green Bay–Fox Cities	Wisconsin	WLUK-TV	11.3
Madison	Wisconsin	WMSN-TV	47.4
Milwaukee–Fond du Lac	Wisconsin	WIWN	68.6
