= Cascade Broadcasting Group =

Two American broadcasting companies

There were two companies under the name Cascade Broadcasting Company:

== Cascade Broadcasting Company (Yakima, Washington) ==
The first Cascade Broadcasting Company was based in Yakima, Washington. It consisted of four television stations and two AM radio stations.

- KIMA-TV Channel 29, (Digital 33) Yakima, Washington
- KEPR-TV Channel 19, (Digital 18) Tri-Cities, Washington
- KLEW-TV Channel 3, (Digital 32) Lewiston, Idaho
- KBAS-TV Channel 43, later 16 (ceased operations 1961), Ephrata, Washington

Although Cascade Broadcasting originally produced its own programming schedule selecting shows from all major networks and syndicators under the direction of James "Jimmy" Nolan, all three remaining television stations are now CBS affiliates. Limited original programming was also produced from the beginning of the regional network. This included news programming, a children's program called "Uncle Jimmy's Clubhouse," starring Jimmy Nolan, and a country-western music program titled "Buckaroo Time," starring Bert Wells.

In 1954, Cascade Broadcasting became the first company in the United States to receive permission from the Federal Communications Commission to operate satellite stations. KEPR-TV, KLEW-TV, and KBAS-TV were given permission to receive KIMA-TV directly off of the air and to retransmit its signal. The only provision the FCC made was that the KIMA-TV station identification announcements were not to be retransmitted by any of its satellites. This saved Cascade the expense of installing AT&T network television microwave service to its satellite stations. KBAS-TV ceased operations and went dark on November 30, 1961.

In 1961, Cascade Broadcasting's original owner, Archie W. Talbot, sold the company to the HalTom Corporation. On October 7, 1968, Cascade was sold to Filmways, Inc. At the time of this sale, Cascade's two AM radio stations, KIMA 1460 kHz, and KEPR 610 kHz, were split off under the ownership of Thomas C. "Tom" Bostic Jr., Cascade's original owner-manager. Filmways was later purchased by Orion Pictures, which included the Cascade television stations. In 1972, Orion sold Cascade to NWG Broadcasting. In 1986, it was sold to Retlaw Enterprises, Inc., a private Disney concern, and, in 1999, it was sold to Fisher Communications of Seattle, Washington. Fisher was merged into Sinclair Broadcast Group in 2013.

== Cascade Broadcasting Group (??–2009) ==
The second Cascade Broadcasting Group was an unrelated business. It owned or operated three television stations:

- WBKI-TV channel 34, Campbellsville, Kentucky, and two repeaters
- W24BW channel 24, Louisville, Kentucky (now WKYI-LD; owned by Greater Louisville Communications)
- KWBA-TV channel 58, Sierra Vista, Arizona

Continued losses by this Cascade began to take a toll on the company. In 2008, it entered into an agreement to sell KWBA to Journal Broadcast Group and its Tucson station KGUN-TV; the Federal Communications Commission allowed Journal to buy the station later in the year by issuing a failing station waiver. WBKI was foreclosed on, and the Louisville stations were sold at auction to Fusion Communications; they later bought W24BW outright.
