= Fox 41 =

Fox 41 may refer to one of the following television stations in the United States, affiliated with the Fox Broadcasting Company:

== Current ==
- KIMA-DT3, a digital subchannel of KIMA-TV in Yakima, Washington (branded as Fox 41)
- WDRB in Louisville, Kentucky

== Former ==
- KCYU-LD in Yakima, Washington (1989–2026)
- KSHB-TV in Kansas City, Missouri (1986–1994)
