= Rincon Broadcasting Group =

American media company

Rincon Broadcasting Group LLC
- Type: Private
- Industry: Broadcast television
- Founded: 2024
- Founder: Todd Parkin
- Defunct: October 1, 2026
- Fate: All station assets sold to Community News Media
- Headquarters: Atlanta, Georgia, U.S.
- Area served: United States (Midwest, Northwest, South, and Southwest)
- Key people: Todd Parkin (President)
- Products: Broadcast television
- Website: rincon.now

Rincon Broadcasting Group LLC was an American broadcasting company based in Atlanta, Georgia. Rincon Broadcasting was founded in late 2024 by Todd Parkin, who served as the company's president. Previously, Parkin was a sales executive for FanDuel Sports Network and the former CEO of PBC Broadcasting from 2009 to 2013.

== History ==
In March 2025, Sinclair Broadcast Group announced it would sell five of its stations across the Midwest to Rincon for $29.4 million. However, on April 14, a petition to deny was filed to the FCC by Frequency Forward, a public-interest organization arguing that the sale perpetuated Sinclair’s use of side‑car ownership structures; this petition did not challenge Rincon’s qualifications. This petition was dismissed by the FCC on July 1, approving of the sale. The purchase was consummated by Rincon on July 9, with Rincon stating it would invest in ATSC 3.0 upgrades and an expansion in local news.

On April 3, 2025, Imagicomm Communications, a shell company affiliated with INSP, announced it would sell seven of its stations across the Western and Southern U.S. to Rincon for an undisclosed amount. The purchase was completed and consummated by Rincon on July 18.

On September 22, 2025, Rincon announced they would buy all four stations from Standard Media for $50 million, pending FCC approval. This includes KBSI and WDKA, which had been acquired from Sinclair in 2020. The sale was completed on February 27, 2026.

In February 2026, it was announced that Sinclair Broadcast Group would acquire KMYT for just over $4.1 million. This comes after Sinclair acquired KOKI and moved the Fox affiliate to KTUL. The sale was completed on April 14.

On March 25, 2026, it was announced that Rincon would be selling all of its stations to Community News Media (a subsidiary of Standard Media) for $116.5 million. The sale was consummated and completed on October 1, effectively dismantling the company.

== Former stations ==
Media market	State	Station	Channel(s)	Network affiliation
Yuma	Arizona	KYMA-DT	11, 13	NBC; CBS (DT2)
Lewiston	Idaho	KLEW-TV	3	CBS
Champaign–Springfield	Illinois	WICD	15	ABC
Champaign–Springfield	Illinois	WICS	20	ABC
Champaign–Springfield	Illinois	WBUI	23	The CW
Champaign–Springfield	Illinois	WRSP-TV	55	Fox
Quincy	Illinois	KHQA-TV	7	CBS; ABC (DT2)
Ottumwa	Iowa	KTVO	3	ABC; CBS (DT2)
Cape Girardeau	Missouri	KBSI	23	Fox
Cape Girardeau	Missouri	WDKA	49	MyNetworkTV
Lincoln	Nebraska	KLKN	8	ABC
Tulsa	Oklahoma	KOKI-TV	23	Roar
Providence	Rhode Island	WLNE-TV	6	Roar
Memphis	Tennessee	WHBQ-TV	13	Fox
Kennewick	Washington	KFFX-TV	11	Roar; Telemundo (DT2)
Kennewick	Washington	KEPR-TV	19	CBS; The CW (DT2); Fox (DT3)
Spokane	Washington	KAYU-TV	28	Fox
Yakima	Washington	KUNW-CD	2	Univision
Yakima	Washington	KIMA-TV	29	CBS; The CW (DT2); Fox (DT3)
Yakima	Washington	KCYU-LD	41	Roar; Telemundo (DT2)
Milwaukee	Wisconsin	WVTV	18, 24	The CW; MyNetworkTV (DT2)
