= Fox 11 =

Fox 11 may refer to one of the following television stations in the United States affiliated with the Fox Broadcasting Company:

== Current ==
- KDFX-CD in Indio–Palm Springs, California (cable channel, broadcasts on virtual channel 33)
- KEPR-DT3, a digital subchannel of KEPR-TV in Pasco, Washington (branded as Fox 11)
- KIIT-CD in North Platte, Nebraska
- KKFX-CD in Santa Maria, California (cable channel, broadcasts on virtual channel 24)
- KMSB in Tucson, Arizona
- KRXI-TV in Reno, Nevada
- KTTV in Los Angeles, California (O&O)
- WBKB-DT4, a digital subchannel of WBKB-TV in Alpena, Michigan
- WLUK-TV in Green Bay, Wisconsin

== Former ==
- KFFX-TV in Pendleton, Oregon / Tri-Cities, Washington (1999–2026)
- WCHS-DT2, a digital subchannel of WCHS-TV in Charleston, West Virginia (was branded as Fox 11 from 2021 to 2026)
- WVAH-TV in Charleston, West Virginia (1986–2021)
