= Fox 19 =

Fox 19 may refer to:

== Current ==
- KEPR-DT3, a digital subchannel of KEPR-TV in Pasco, Washington (brands as Fox Tri-Cities 19.3)
- KVCT in Victoria, Texas
- WXIX-TV in Newport, Kentucky / Cincinnati, Ohio

== Former ==
- WOIO in Cleveland, Ohio (1986–1994)
- WZMQ in Marquette, Michigan (2003–2009)

== See also ==
- Channel 19 virtual TV stations in the United States
