= CBS 19 =

CBS 19 may refer to one of the following television stations in the United States:

== Currently affiliates ==
- KEPR-TV in Pasco–Richland–Kennewick, Washington
  - Semi-satellite of KIMA-TV in Yakima, Washington
- KYTX in Nacogdoches–Tyler, Texas
- WCAV in Charlottesville, Virginia
- WHNT-TV in Huntsville, Alabama
- WLTX in Columbia, South Carolina
- WOIO in Shaker Heights–Cleveland, Ohio
- WZMQ-DT2, a digital channel of WZMQ in Marquette, Michigan

== Formerly affiliated ==
- WARD-TV/WJNL-TV (now WPKD-TV) in Johnstown–Altoona–State College, Pennsylvania (1953–1978)
