= CW 9 =

CW 9 or CW9 may refer to the following:

== Television stations in the United States affiliated with The CW ==
=== Current ===
==== Owned-and-operated ====
- WGN-TV in Chicago, Illinois
- WNCT-DT2 in Greenville, North Carolina

==== Affiliates ====
- KECY-DT3 in El Centro, California–Yuma, Arizona
- KIMA-DT2 in Yakima, Washington (cable channel, broadcasts on channel 29.2)
  - KEPR-DT2, a semi-satellite of KIMA-TV (cable channel, broadcasts on channel 19.2)

=== Former ===
- KCWK in Walla Walla, Washington (2006–2008)
- KNIN-TV in Caldwell–Boise, Idaho (2006–2011)
- KWES-DT2 in Odessa–Midland, Texas (2013–2019)
- WAOW-DT2 in Wausau, Wisconsin (2006–2021)

== Other uses ==
- A postcode district in the CW postcode area in Cheshire, England
