= Channel 29 virtual TV stations in the United States =

The following television stations operate on virtual channel 29 in the United States:

- K11SZ-D in Oakridge, Oregon
- K16LI-D in Port Orford, Oregon
- K19CV-D in Redwood Falls, Minnesota
- K19EC-D in Mapleton, Oregon
- K20IR-D in Cottage Grove, Oregon
- K20LL-D in Reedsport, Oregon
- K21FS-D in Eugene, Oregon
- K23KD-D in Coos Bay, etc., Oregon
- K23NE-D in Ellensburg, Washington
- K25LA-D in Fort Morgan, Colorado
- K28QN-D in College Station, Texas
- K29GK-D in Twentynine Palms, etc, California
- K29HW-D in Austin, Texas
- K29IF-D in Frost, Minnesota
- K29JU-D in Garden City, Kansas
- K29KG-D in Idaho Falls, Idaho
- K29KY-D in Blackfoot, Idaho
- K29MQ-D in Redwood Falls, Minnesota
- K29NW-D in Midland, Texas
- K29NX-D in Alexandria, Louisiana
- K29NY-D in Alexandria, Minnesota
- K29OC-D in Chapman, Kansas
- K29OF-D in Deadwood, South Dakota
- K30AF-D in Alexandria, Minnesota
- K32HF-D in Florence, Oregon
- K32OC-D in Corpus Christi, Texas
- K33KD-D in London Springs, Oregon
- K33LZ-D in Myrtle Point, Oregon
- K34JX-D in St. James, Minnesota
- K34OZ-D in Olivia, Minnesota
- KABB in San Antonio, Texas
- KBAK-TV in Bakersfield, California
- KBDH-LD in Bend, Oregon
- KBJE-LD in Tyler, Texas
- KCWE in Kansas City, Missouri
- KECA-LD in Eureka, California
- KGRQ-LD in Gila River Indian Community, Arizona
- KGRX-LD in Gila River Indian Community, Arizona
- KGRY-LD in Gila River Indian Community, Arizona
- KHNE-TV in Hastings, Nebraska
- KHOG-TV in Fayetteville, Arkansas
- KIMA-TV in Yakima, Washington
- KJYY-LD in Portland, Oregon
- KMPX in Decatur, Texas
- KNKC-LD in Lubbock, Texas
- KPCE-LD in Tucson, Arizona
- KQMM-CD in Santa Maria, California
- KRLB-LD in Richland, etc., Washington
- KSPX-TV in Sacramento, California
- KTNR-LD in Laredo, Texas
- KTZT-CD in Tulsa, Oklahoma
- KUPT in Hobbs, New Mexico
- KVHP in Lake Charles, Louisiana
- W22EX-D in Staunton, Virginia
- W29CI-D in Salem, Illinois
- W29CW-D in Duck Key, Florida
- W29DN-D in Athens, Georgia
- W29EN-D in Soperton, Georgia
- W28EZ-D in Gainesville, Florida
- W29FJ-D in Dothan, Alabama
- W29FK-D in Clarksburg, West Virginia
- W29FN-D in Panama City, Florida
- W29FO-D in Tallahassee, Florida
- W29FR-D in Lebanon-Nashville, Tennessee
- W31EU-D in Columbus, Georgia
- WAUR-LD in Aurora, Illinois
- WAZS-LD in North Charleston, South Carolina
- WBIH in Selma, Alabama
- WDZC-LD in Augusta, Georgia
- WEDS-LD in Mobile, Alabama
- WFET-LD in Lewisburg, Tennessee
- WFLX in West Palm Beach, Florida
- WGTU in Traverse City, Michigan
- WHVL-LD in State College, etc., Pennsylvania
- WIVN-LD in Newcomerstown, Ohio
- WJDO-LD in Macon, Georgia
- WKPD in Paducah, Kentucky
- WKSO-TV in Somerset, Kentucky
- WLPX-TV in Charleston, West Virginia
- WMPN-TV in Jackson, Mississippi
- WMUM-TV in Cochran, Georgia
- WNTV in Greenville, South Carolina
- WOMS-CD in Muskegon, Michigan
- WOOH-LD in Zanesville, Ohio
- WRCF-CD in Orlando, Florida
- WTHV-LD in Huntsville, Alabama
- WTMV-LD in Ogden, North Carolina
- WTNX-LD in Nashville, Tennessee
- WTTK in Kokomo, Indiana
- WTXF-TV in Philadelphia, Pennsylvania
- WUBF-LD in Jacksonville, Florida
- WUHQ-LD in Grand Rapids, Michigan
- WUTV in Buffalo, New York
- WVIR-CD in Charlottesville, Virginia
- WVIR-TV in Charlottesville, Virginia
- WZPK-LD in Highland, New York

The following stations, which are no longer licensed, formerly operated on virtual channel 29:

- K29JB-D in Moses Lake, Washington
- K29JD-D in Redding, California
- K29JF-D in Rolla, Missouri
- K29JT-D in Butte, Montana
- KBKV-LD in Columbia, Missouri
- KFJK-LD in Santa Fe, New Mexico
- W29DT-D in Tuscaloosa, Alabama
- W29EJ-D in Parkersburg, West Virginia
- W30EX-D in Lima, Ohio
- WAOH-CD in Akron, Ohio
- WEHG-LD in Wausau, Wisconsin
- WTMQ-LD in Jacksonville, North Carolina
