= Standard Media =

American media company

Standard Media Group LLC
- Type: Private
- Industry: Broadcast Television; Television Production; Digital Media
- Founded: 2018
- Headquarters: Nashville, Tennessee
- Area served: United States (Midwest, Northeast, and Southeast)
- Key people: Deborah A. McDermott (chief executive officer); Stan Knott (chief operating officer); Andrew C. Carington (chief legal officer); Jim Carr (head of digital media)
- Products: Broadcast television; Digital media; Over the Top Television
- Website: www.standardmedia.com

Standard Media Group LLC is an American broadcast and digital media company based in Nashville, Tennessee, and is a subsidiary of Standard General. Standard Media was founded in 2018 by Deborah A. McDermott, who serves as the company's CEO. Previously, McDermott was the chief operating officer of Media General and CEO-president of Young Broadcasting.

== History ==
Between 2012 and 2017, McDermott and her team led the acquisition of more than 90 television stations and helped grow Young/Media General from a $220 million regional TV group to a nearly $5 billion media company. In 2017, Media General was acquired by Nexstar Broadcasting Group for $4.6 billion.

In April 2018, the divestiture of stations by Sinclair Broadcasting during the Tribune Media buyout opened an opportunity for Standard Media to purchase several of the stations. They would've purchase nine stations. The deal fell through when the Sinclair-Tribune merger was terminated on August 9, 2018.

On May 16, 2019, Standard Media announced plans to purchase two ABC-affiliated television stations from Citadel Communications for $83 million. The stations, WLNE-TV in Providence, Rhode Island and KLKN in Lincoln, Nebraska, have been operated by Citadel since 2011 and 1996 respectively. The company announced the acquisition of Waypoint Media and its affiliated companies in November 2019 for $59.2 million. The Waypoint deal collapsed in January 2021.

In November 2020, Sinclair Broadcast Group announced that they would sell Fox affiliate KBSI and MyNetworkTV affiliate WDKA in Paducah, Kentucky, to Community News Media (a subsidiary of Standard Media) for $28 million, in a transaction that closed in 2021.

On February 22, 2022, a partnership of Standard General and Apollo Global Management announced their intent to acquire Tegna; Apollo will hold non-voting shares in the company. As part of the sale, Standard General will sell Standard Media to Cox Media Group, which will also acquire Tegna's stations in Dallas–Fort Worth, Houston, and Austin (including WFAA, KHOU, and KVUE). WFXT in Boston will then be divested to Standard General. The sale was approved by Standard General and Apollo Global Management on May 17, 2022. In February 2023, it was confirmed that the deal would be given a hearing before an administrative law judge, which the FCC Commissioner's Board voted to remand the merger review. The deal was terminated on May 22, 2023.

On June 3, 2024, Standard Media and the Chicago Blackhawks, Bulls, and White Sox announced the new regional sports network Chicago Sports Network, which is expected to launch in time for the Blackhawks' and Bulls' 2024–25 season. It was later confirmed that the network would launch October 1.

On September 22, 2025, it was announced that Rincon Broadcasting Group would buy all four stations for $50 million, pending FCC approval. The sale was completed on February 27, 2026.

On March 25, 2026, it was announced that Rincon would sell all of its stations to Community News Media (including the recent ones from Standard) for $116.5 million. The sale was completed on October 1.

== Stations ==
Media market	State	Station	Channel(s)	Acquired	Network affiliation	Notes
Yuma	Arizona	KYMA-DT	11, 13	2026	NBC; CBS	(Note: Operated by News-Press & Gazette Company.)
Lewiston	Idaho	KLEW-TV	3	2026	CBS	(Note: Operated by Sinclair Broadcast Group.)
Champaign–Springfield	Illinois	WICD	15	2026	ABC	
Champaign–Springfield	Illinois	WICS	20	2026	ABC	
Champaign–Springfield	Illinois	WBUI	23	2026	The CW	(Note: Owned by GOCOM Media, LLC.)
Champaign–Springfield	Illinois	WRSP-TV	55	2026	Fox	
Quincy	Illinois	KHQA-TV	7	2026	CBS; ABC	
Ottumwa	Iowa	KTVO	3	2026	ABC; CBS	
Cape Girardeau	Missouri	KBSI	23	2021; 2026	Fox	(Note: Operated by Sinclair Broadcast Group.)
Cape Girardeau	Missouri	WDKA	49	2021; 2026	MyNetworkTV	
Lincoln	Nebraska	KLKN	8	2019; 2026	ABC	
Tulsa	Oklahoma	KOKI-TV	23	2026	Roar	
Providence	Rhode Island	WLNE-TV	6	2019; 2026	Roar	
Memphis	Tennessee	WHBQ-TV	13	2026	Fox	
Kennewick	Washington	KFFX-TV	11	2026	Roar; Telemundo	
Kennewick	Washington	KEPR-TV	19	2026	CBS; The CW; Fox	
Spokane	Washington	KAYU-TV	28	2026	Fox	
Yakima	Washington	KUNW-CD	2	2026	Univision	
Yakima	Washington	KIMA-TV	29	2026	CBS; The CW; Fox	
Yakima	Washington	KCYU-LD	41	2026	Roar; Telemundo	
Milwaukee	Wisconsin	WVTV	18, 24	2026	The CW; MyNetworkTV	
