= WED Enterprises =

WED Enterprises may refer to:

- Walt Disney Imagineering, a design and architectural group sold by Retlaw Enterprises to Walt Disney Productions
- Retlaw Enterprises, a holding company originally called Walt Disney Inc. and renamed WED Enterprises, which transferred the latter name with its sale of the design and architectural group
