= ABC 42 =

ABC 42 may refer to one of the following television stations in the United States:

- KESQ-TV in Palm Springs, California
- KSAX in Alexandria, Minnesota:
  - Satellite of KSTP-TV in Minneapolis/Saint Paul, Minnesota
- KTMF-LD in Kalispell, Montana:
  - Semi-satellite of KTMF in Missoula, Montana
- KVEW in Kennewick, Washington
  - Semi-satellite of KAPP in Yakima, Washington
