= WDKA =

Television station in Paducah, Kentucky

- Paducah, Kentucky; Harrisburg, Illinois; Cape Girardeau, Missouri; United States
- City: Paducah, Kentucky
- Channels: Digital: 25 (UHF); Virtual: 49
- Branding: My 49 WDKA

Programming
- Affiliations: 49.1: Independent with MyNetworkTV; for others, see § Subchannels

Ownership
- Owner: Standard Media; (Community News Media LLC)
- Operator: Sinclair Broadcast Group
- Sister stations: KBSI

History
- Founded: October 2, 1989
- First air date: June 5, 1997
- Former channel numbers: Analog: 49 (UHF, 1997–2009); Digital: 50 (UHF, 2000–2010), 49 (UHF, 2010–2019)
- Former affiliations: UPN (1997–2000); The WB (1998–2006; secondary until 2000)
- Call sign meaning: Paducah (soundalike "K" substituting for "C")

Technical information
- Licensing authority: FCC
- Facility ID: 39561
- ERP: 1,000 kW
- HAAT: 327 m (1,073 ft)
- Transmitter coordinates: 37°23′42″N 88°56′23″W
- Translator(s): KBSI 23.2 Cape Girardeau, MO

Links
- Public license information: Public file; LMS
- Website: kbsi23.com

WDKA (channel 49) is a television station licensed to Paducah, Kentucky, United States, serving Western Kentucky's Purchase region, Southern Illinois and Southeastern Missouri, and Northwest Tennessee. It is programmed primarily as an independent station, but maintains a secondary affiliation with MyNetworkTV. WDKA is owned by Standard Media and operated by Sinclair Broadcast Group alongside Cape Girardeau, Missouri–licensed Fox affiliate KBSI (channel 23). WDKA and KBSI share studios on Enterprise Street in Cape Girardeau; WDKA's transmitter is located in Vienna, Illinois.

In addition to its own digital signal, WDKA is simulcast in standard definition on KBSI's second digital subchannel (23.2) from a transmitter north of Cape Girardeau in unincorporated Cape Girardeau County.

== History ==
WDKA began broadcasting on June 5, 1997. It was a UPN affiliate broadcasting an analog signal on UHF channel 49. On April 1, 2000, WDKA switched affiliations with low-powered station WQTV-LP (licensed to Murray, Kentucky) to become an affiliate of The WB; it had been airing the network's programming off-hours since September 1998. In September 2006, The WB and UPN merged to become The CW, and WQTV-LP was announced to become The CW affiliate for Paducah in advance of the merger. As a result, WDKA became affiliated with MyNetworkTV when it launched on September 5.

On August 30, 2014, WDKA became a charter affiliate of Sinclair's ad-hoc syndicated television network, the American Sports Network. ASN provided Ohio Valley Conference basketball and Conference USA football and basketball games to the station's viewers. The ASN's programming content replaced Southeastern Conference football and basketball broadcasts from ESPN Plus-oriented SEC TV, which was run from 2009 until 2014, which was discontinued because of the launch of the pay TV-exclusive SEC Network.

On March 3, 2016, WDKA Acquisition Corporation (owned by Paul T. Lucci) filed to sell WDKA to Sinclair's subsidiary WDKA Licensee, LLC. Sinclair bought the station for $1.9 million. The sale was completed on September 1, 2017. Sinclair would continue to own WDKA and KBSI until both were sold to Community News Media for $28 million in a transaction that closed in 2021.

On July 22, 2025, Sinclair announced that it had re-purchased the non-license assets of WDKA and KBSI, with an option to re-acquire the stations' broadcast licenses.

On September 22, 2025, it was announced that Rincon Broadcasting Group would be buying WDKA and KBSI along with the other stations owned by Standard Media for $50 million, pending FCC approval. The sale was completed on February 27, 2026. In March 2026, Community News Media LLC, which operates as Standard Media Group and is led by Soohyung Kim with Deborah McDermott as chief executive, agreed to acquire Rincon Broadcasting's stations, including WDKA and KBSI, for $116.5 million; the sale was completed on October 1.

== Technical information ==
=== Subchannels ===
The station's signal is multiplexed:

Subchannels of WDKA
Subchannel	Res.	Short name	Programming
49.1	720p	MyTV	Main WDKA programming
49.2	480i	Charge!	Charge!
49.3	480i	Roar	Roar
49.4	480i	TheNest	The Nest
49.5	480i	Dabl	Dabl
49.6	480i	CourtTV	Court TV
49.7	480i	CHSN	[Blank]

=== Analog-to-digital conversion ===
WDKA shut down its analog signal, over UHF channel 49, on February 17, 2009, the original target date on which full-power television stations in the United States were to transition from analog to digital broadcasts under federal mandate (which was pushed back to June 12, 2009). The station's digital signal remained on its pre-transition UHF channel 50, using virtual channel 49.

=== Spectrum reallocation ===
In October 2019, WDKA reallocated its digital signal onto UHF channel 25 as a result of the station's participation in the FCC's spectrum incentive auction.
