= Channel 9 branded TV stations in the United States =

The following television stations in the United States brand as channel 9 (though neither using virtual channel 9 nor broadcasting on physical RF channel 9):

- KBJR-DT3 in Superior, Wisconsin
- KEPR-DT2 in Pasco, Washington
- KIMA-DT2 in Yakima, Washington
- KRII-DT3 in Chisholm, Minnesota
- KUSI-TV in San Diego, California
- WCTX in New Haven, Connecticut

The following television stations in the United States formerly branded as channel 9:

- WRDE-LD in Rehoboth Beach, Delaware
