= KLEW-TV =

Television station in Lewiston, Idaho

Semi-satellite of KIMA-TV, Yakima, Washington
- Lewiston–Moscow, Idaho; Clarkston–Pullman, Washington; United States
- City: Lewiston, Idaho
- Channels: Digital: 32 (UHF); Virtual: 3
- Branding: KLEW-TV; KLEW News (call letters are pronounced individually)

Programming
- Affiliations: 3.1: CBS; for others, see § Subchannels

Ownership
- Owner: Sinclair Broadcast Group; (Sinclair Lewiston Licensee, LLC)
- Operator: Standard Media
- Sister stations: KAYU-TV; KEPR-TV; KIMA-TV; KUNW-CD

History
- First air date: December 7, 1955
- Former channel numbers: Analog: 3 (VHF, 1955–2009)
- Former affiliations: Both secondary: ABC (1955–1959, 1965–1970); NBC (1955–1965)
- Call sign meaning: Lewiston

Technical information
- Licensing authority: FCC
- Facility ID: 56032
- ERP: 133 kW
- HAAT: 349 m (1,145 ft)
- Transmitter coordinates: 46°27′27″N 117°6′0″W
- Translator(s): see § Translators

Links
- Public license information: Public file; LMS
- Website: klewtv.com

KLEW-TV (channel 3) is a television station licensed to Lewiston, Idaho, United States, affiliated with CBS. The station serves the Lewis–Clark Valley and Palouse regions of north-central Idaho and southeastern Washington, as well as Wallowa County, Oregon. Owned by Sinclair Broadcast Group and operated by Standard Media, KLEW-TV maintains studios on 17th Street in Lewiston, and its transmitter is located near Clarkston, Washington.

Though identifying as a station in its own right, KLEW-TV is considered a semi-satellite of KIMA-TV (channel 29) in Yakima, which operates another semi-satellite, KEPR-TV (channel 19) in Tri-Cities, Washington. KLEW and KEPR simulcast all network and syndicated programming as provided through KIMA, but air separate commercial inserts, legal identifications and weeknight newscasts, and have their own websites. Master control and some internal operations are based at KOMO Plaza (formerly Fisher Plaza) in Seattle.

The area that KLEW-TV serves, including Lewiston, is part of the Spokane, Washington, television market, and the station is one of two CBS affiliates in the market, along with Tegna–owned KREM (channel 2), which is licensed to Spokane and typically considered as the primary CBS affiliate for the market. Both stations are carried on Dish Network and DirecTV throughout the market. KLEW-TV shares a general manager with KAYU-TV (channel 28), the Fox affiliate in Spokane.

== History ==
KLEW-TV signed on the air December 7, 1955, under the ownership of Cascade Broadcasting. It has always been a CBS affiliate; however, as a satellite of KIMA-TV, it also carried some programming from ABC and NBC in its early years. The station's original studio facilities were located on Idaho Street in Lewiston.

Filmways agreed to purchase Cascade Broadcasting for $3 million in 1968; the sale was approved the following year. Filmways sold KLEW-TV, KIMA-TV, and KEPR-TV to NWG Broadcasting for $1 million in 1972. In 1977, KLEW moved from its original studios on Idaho Street to its current location on 17th Street.

KLEW logo used until 2008; some newscast graphics continued to use this logo for a time afterward.

Retlaw Enterprises acquired the NWG stations, including KLEW-TV, for $17 million in 1986; the stations were operated as part of the Retlaw Broadcasting division. Fisher Companies (later known as Fisher Communications) agreed to purchase the Retlaw stations for $215 million on November 19, 1998, a deal that was completed in July 1999. On April 11, 2013, Fisher announced that it would sell its properties to the Sinclair Broadcast Group; the deal was completed on August 8, 2013. By May 2026, management of the station had been taken over by Rincon Broadcasting Group, with KLEW-TV sharing a general manager with Rincon's KAYU-TV in Spokane, Washington.

== Newscasts ==
KLEW-TV airs local newscasts weeknights at 5, 6 and 11 p.m., local news cut-ins during the weekday edition of CBS Mornings from 7 to 9 a.m., that includes a short 5-minute interview segment called Northwest Morning, and simulcasts sister station KIMA-TV's 5 and 6:30 a.m. newscasts, as KLEW does not have morning, midday or weekend newscasts.

On June 19, 2023, Sinclair moved production of KLEW-TV's newscasts to KBOI-TV in Boise, Idaho, though its reporters remained based in Lewiston. The move followed a two-week transition period, following the departure of the station's news director and weather forecaster, where the newscast originated from KEPR-TV. On May 5, 2026, KLEW-TV resumed producing local newscasts from the Lewiston studio, with weather and regional news segments originating from KIMA-TV.

=== Notable former on-air staff ===
- Nadine Woodward – weeknight news anchor (1985–1987). Former mayor of Spokane, Washington.

== Subchannels ==
The station's signal is multiplexed:

Subchannels of KLEW-TV
Subchannel	Res.	Short name	Programming
3.1	1080i	CBS3	CBS
3.2	480i	Charge!	Charge!
3.3	480i	Comet	Comet
3.4	480i	TBD	Roar

=== Translators ===
- K16LX-D — Juliaetta, Idaho
- K13AP — Kamiah, Idaho
- KLEW-TV (DRT) — Moscow, Idaho
