= KBSI =

Television station in Cape Girardeau, Missouri

- Cape Girardeau, Missouri; Paducah, Kentucky; Harrisburg, Illinois; United States
- City: Cape Girardeau, Missouri
- Channels: Digital: 36 (UHF); Virtual: 23
- Branding: Fox 23; Fox 23 News

Programming
- Affiliations: 23.1: Fox; 23.2: Independent with MyNetworkTV; for others, see § Subchannels

Ownership
- Owner: Standard Media; (Community News Media LLC)
- Operator: Sinclair Broadcast Group
- Sister stations: WDKA

History
- Founded: June 1, 1982
- First air date: September 10, 1983
- Former channel numbers: Analog: 23 (UHF, 1983–2009); Digital: 22 (UHF, 2001–2019)
- Former affiliations: Independent (1983–1987); ABC (NYPD Blue only, 1993–94)
- Call sign meaning: Station's coverage area of Kentucky, the (Missouri) Bootheel, and Southern Illinois

Technical information
- Licensing authority: FCC
- Facility ID: 19593
- ERP: 1,000 kW
- HAAT: 543 m (1,781 ft)
- Transmitter coordinates: 37°24′23″N 89°33′44″W

Links
- Public license information: Public file; LMS
- Website: kbsi23.com

KBSI (channel 23) is a television station licensed to Cape Girardeau, Missouri, United States, serving as the Fox affiliate for Southeastern Missouri, the Purchase area of Western Kentucky, Southern Illinois, and Northwest Tennessee. It is owned by Standard Media and operated by Sinclair Broadcast Group alongside Paducah, Kentucky–licensed WDKA (channel 49), an independent station with MyNetworkTV. KBSI and WDKA share studios on Enterprise Street in Cape Girardeau; KBSI's transmitter is located in unincorporated Cape Girardeau County north of the city.

== History ==
The station signed on the air on September 10, 1983, as an independent station and aired an analog signal on UHF channel 23. The station was originally owned by Cape Girardeau Family Television, Ltd., in turn 51 percent owned by Media Central of Chattanooga, Tennessee. Prior to the station's launch, two independent stations were broadcast in southern Illinois, and a prior attempt had been made at an independent in Paducah, but this was the first independent station to cover all of the market, which was the reason Media Central had been attracted to the area.

Media Central filed for bankruptcy in 1987, and attempted to sell its properties to another television station owner. On September 7, 1987, KBSI joined the Fox network despite declining to carry the network the previous year, partly because of the Media Central bankruptcy. Media Central continued to own the station until a bankruptcy judge approved its acquisition by Engles Communications, owned by David Engles, a former Warner Bros. and NBC radio executive. Under Engles, KBSI aired the first season of NYPD Blue when ABC affiliate WSIL-TV refused to air the show.

Engles then sold the station to Max Television (later Max Media Properties) in 1995. In 1998, Sinclair Broadcast Group acquired most of the Max Media Properties stations, including KBSI; it owned KBSI and later WDKA in Paducah until both were sold to Community News Media for $28 million in a transaction that closed in 2021.

On July 22, 2025, Sinclair announced that it had repurchased the non-license assets of KBSI and WDKA, with an option to reacquire the stations' broadcast licenses. On September 22, 2025, it was announced that Rincon Broadcasting Group would be buying the KBSI and WDKA licenses along with the other stations owned by Standard Media for $50 million; the sale was completed on February 27, 2026. In March 2026, Community News Media LLC, which operates as Standard Media Group and is led by Soohyung Kim with Deborah McDermott as chief executive, agreed to acquire Rincon Broadcasting's stations, including KBSI and WDKA, for $116.5 million; the sale was completed on October 1.

== Newscasts ==
From 2006 to September 30, 2010, NBC affiliate WPSD-TV (owned by the Paxton Media Group) produced a nightly prime time newscast for KBSI through a news share agreement. When the WPSD newscast started, KBSI competed with another nightly half-hour newscast at 9 p.m. on the area's low-powered CW affiliates WQTV-LP/WQWQ-LP. That newscast, produced by CBS affiliate KFVS-TV, focused on news from southeastern Missouri and was eventually canceled on July 29, 2007.

On October 1, 2010, KBSI entered into a new agreement with KFVS to produce the newscast, which expanded to an hour in length. This agreement ended in March 2022 with KFVS moving the newscast to KFVS-DT2. On March 28, 2022, KBSI debuted its own newscast, produced out of Lincoln, Nebraska, at sister station KLKN. The news and weather anchors are based in Lincoln while the reporters work out of the KBSI studios in Cape Girardeau.

== Technical information ==
=== Subchannels ===
The station's signal is multiplexed:

Subchannels of KBSI
Subchannel	Res.	Short name	Programming
23.1	720p	KBSI-DT	Fox
23.2	480i	WDKA-DT	SD simulcast of WDKA (Independent with MyNetworkTV)
23.3	480i	COMET	Comet
23.4	480i	IONPLUS	Ion Plus
23.5	480i	BOUNCE	Bounce TV
23.6	480i	BUZZR	Buzzr

Simulcast of subchannels of another station

=== Analog-to-digital conversion ===
KBSI shut down its analog signal, over UHF channel 23, on February 17, 2009, the original target date on which full-power television stations in the United States were to transition from analog to digital broadcasts under federal mandate (which was later pushed back to June 12, 2009). The station's digital signal remained on its pre-transition UHF channel 22, using virtual channel 23.
