= KCYU-LD =

Television station in Yakima, Washington

Semi-satellite of KFFX-TV, Pendleton, Oregon
- Yakima, Washington; United States
- Channels: Digital: 29 (UHF); Virtual: 41

Programming
- Affiliations: 41.1: Roar; 41.2: Telemundo; 41.3: Ion

Ownership
- Owner: Standard Media; (Community News Media LLC)
- Sister stations: KIMA-TV; KUNW-CD

History
- First air date: October 1, 1989 (as K53CY); May 1993 (current license)
- Former call signs: K53CY (1989–1993); K68EB (1993–1995); KCYU-LP (1995–2009)
- Former channel numbers: Analog: 53 (UHF, 1989–1993), 68 (UHF, 1993–2003), 41 (UHF, 2003–2008); Digital: 41 (UHF, 2008–2018)
- Former affiliations: Fox (1989–2026)
- Call sign meaning: Disambiguation of K53CY translator-era calls, former mother station KAYU

Technical information
- Licensing authority: FCC
- Facility ID: 58694
- Class: LD
- ERP: 15 kW
- HAAT: 273.3 m (897 ft)
- Transmitter coordinates: 46°31′51.6″N 120°30′54″W

Links
- Public license information: LMS

KCYU-LD (channel 41) is a low-power television station in Yakima, Washington, United States, affiliated with Roar and Telemundo. It is owned by Standard Media and operated alongside CBS/CW+/Fox affiliate KIMA-TV (channel 29) and Univision affiliate KUNW-CD (channel 2). KCYU-LD's studios are located on West Lincoln Avenue in Yakima, and its transmitter is located on Ahtanum Ridge.

Although considered a separate station in its own right, KCYU-LD is a semi-satellite of Pendleton, Oregon–licensed KFFX-TV (channel 11), which serves the Tri-Cities area. KCYU-LD simulcasts all Roar programming as provided through its parent station, with the only difference being the hourly station identification as Roar uses a master default schedule. KFFX-TV serves the eastern half of the Tri-Cities–Yakima market while KCYU-LD serves the western portion. Master control and some internal operations of KCYU-LD are based at KFFX-TV's studios on Clearwater Avenue in Kennewick. On satellite, KCYU-LD is only available on Dish Network, while DirecTV carries KFFX-TV instead.

== History ==
Fox programming first came to Yakima on October 1, 1989, when K53CY channel 53 (generally referred to as simply "KCY") signed on as a semi-satellite of Spokane's KAYU-TV; it aired most of KAYU's programming (with the exception of programming that KAYU did not hold the rights to show in Yakima), with inserts for local commercials. Prior to K53CY's sign-on, Fox programming was available on Yakima cable from KAYU; subsequently, KAYU was not carried in Ellensburg. A construction permit for a new low-power station on channel 68 in Yakima was issued on April 1, 1993, and given the call sign K68EB; this facility signed on a month later. Despite the different call sign, K68EB was still called "KCY" outside of Federal Communications Commission (FCC)–required station identifications.

Original owner Salmon River Communications sold K68EB, along with KAYU-TV, KBWU-LP in the Tri-Cities, and KMVU in Medford, Oregon, to Northwest Broadcasting in 1995. The call letters were changed to KCYU-LP on November 20, 1995. KCYU-LP remained a semi-satellite of KAYU until January 1999, when it became a semi-satellite of the new KFFX-TV. The station remained on channel 68 until 2003, when KCYU-LP moved to channel 41. On December 15, 2008, KCYU-LP ended analog broadcasting and converted to a high definition digital signal; in reflection of this conversion, the call letters were modified to the current KCYU-LD on July 8, 2009.

In February 2019, Reuters reported that Apollo Global Management had agreed to acquire the entirety of Brian Brady's television portfolio, which it intended to merge with Cox Media Group (which Apollo was acquiring at the same time) and stations spun off from Nexstar Media Group's purchase of Tribune Broadcasting, once the purchases were approved by the FCC. In March 2019 filings with the FCC, Apollo confirmed that its newly-formed broadcasting group, Terrier Media, would acquire Northwest Broadcasting, with Brian Brady holding an unspecified minority interest in Terrier. In June 2019, it was announced that Terrier Media would instead operate as Cox Media Group, as Apollo had reached a deal to also acquire Cox's radio and advertising businesses. The transaction was completed on December 17.

On March 29, 2022, Cox Media Group announced it would sell KCYU-LD, KFFX-TV and 16 other stations to Imagicomm Communications, an affiliate of the parent company of the INSP cable channel, for $488 million; the sale was completed on August 1.

On April 3, 2025, Imagicomm announced that it would sell seven stations, including KCYU-LD and KFFX-TV, to Todd Parkin's Rincon Broadcasting Group; the deal was consummated on July 18. In February 2026, it was reported that Rincon had entered into an agreement to take over the operations of Sinclair Broadcast Group's stations in the market, including KIMA-TV, KEPR-TV, KLEW-TV, and KUNW-CD. In March 2026, Community News Media LLC, which operates as Standard Media Group and is led by Soohyung Kim with Deborah McDermott as chief executive, agreed to acquire Rincon Broadcasting's stations, including KCYU-LD and KFFX-TV, for $116.5 million; the sale was completed on October 1.

On April 1, 2026, KCYU's intellectual unit (Fox affiliation, branding, and syndicated programming) moved to the third subchannel of KIMA-TV. As a result, Roar moved to KCYU's main subchannel.

== Newscasts ==
KCYU-LD airs a nightly newscast, Fox First at Ten. The program was formerly produced by KNDU as part of a partnership between the station and Cowles Company. In March 2026, production of the newscast was transferred to KIMA-TV. KCYU also airs KAYU's KHQ-produced Good Day on weekday mornings.

== Technical information ==
=== Subchannels ===
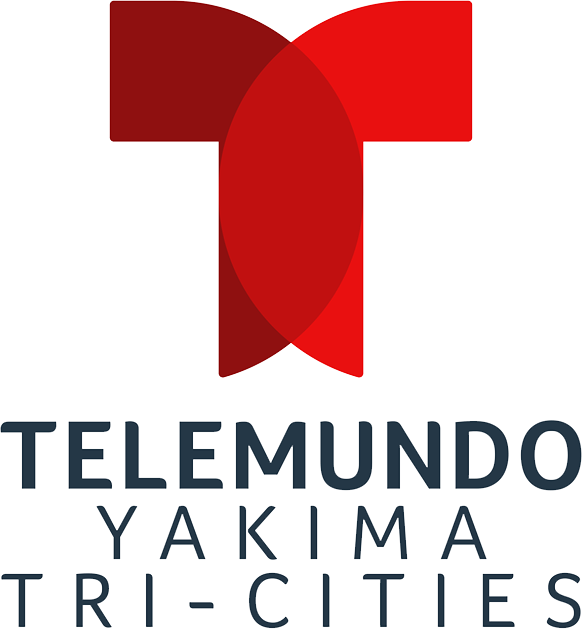
Logo for Telemundo subchannel

The station's signal is multiplexed:

Subchannels of KCYU-LD
Subchannel	Res.	Short name	Programming
41.1	720p	KCYU-HD	Roar
41.2	720p	Telmund	Telemundo
41.3	480i	ION	Ion

=== Translator ===
- K26NF-D Ellensburg (owned by the Kittitas County TV Improvement District)
