= Channel 19 virtual TV stations in the United States =

The following television stations operate on virtual channel 19 in the United States:

- K03IY-D in Denver, Colorado
- K10JW-D in Verdigre, Nebraska
- K14MI-D in Niobrara, Nebraska
- K15LM-D in McAlester, Oklahoma
- K15MR-D in Fargo, North Dakota
- K19AA-D in Altus, Oklahoma
- K19FD-D in Camp Verde, Arizona
- K19GS-D in Rural Beaver, etc., Utah
- K19IP-D in Flagstaff, Arizona
- K19JA-D in Cortez, Colorado
- K19JX-D in Yakima, Washington
- K19LI-D in St. James, Minnesota
- K19NB-D in Gustine, California
- K19NE-D in Gateway, Colorado
- K19NF-D in Socorro, New Mexico
- K24CT-D in Alamogordo, New Mexico
- K26PA-D in Ardmore, Oklahoma
- K27NI-D in Neligh, Nebraska
- K32MF-D in Red Lake, Minnesota
- K32MG-D in Enid, Oklahoma
- K34IB-D in Decatur, Nebraska
- KBBV-CD in Bakersfield, California
- KBNY-LD in Monterey, California
- KCPT in Kansas City, Missouri
- KDMI in Des Moines, Iowa
- KEPR-TV in Pasco, Washington
- KGBS-CD in Austin, Texas
- KGRF-LD in Gila River Indian Co, Arizona
- KHDF-CD in Las Vegas, Nevada
- KIPB-LD in Pine Bluff, Arkansas
- KJRE in Ellendale, North Dakota
- KJYK-LD in Beaumont, Texas
- KKAC in Carlsbad, New Mexico
- KKTW-LD in Minneapolis, Minnesota
- KOBS-LD in San Antonio, Texas
- KPDR-LD in Salt Lake City, Utah
- KQCW-DT in Muskogee, Oklahoma
- KTEJ in Jonesboro, Arkansas
- KTEV-LD in Texarkana, Arkansas
- KUES in Richfield, Utah
- KUVS-DT in Modesto, California
- KVBA-LD in Alamogordo, New Mexico
- KVCT in Victoria, Texas
- KWBQ in Santa Fe, New Mexico
- KWKS in Colby, Kansas
- KWWE-LD in Lake Charles, Louisiana
- KXCH-LD in Chico, California
- KXNE-TV in Norfolk, Nebraska
- KYTX in Nacogdoches, Texas
- W19CO-D in Pensacola, Florida
- W19DN-D in Macon, Georgia
- W19DW-D in Columbus, Georgia
- W19EE-D in Jacksonville, Illinois
- W19EF-D in Greenville, Mississippi
- W19EW-D in Evansville, Indiana
- W19EX-D in Gainesville, Florida
- W19EZ-D in Houghton Lake, Michigan
- W19FB-D in Traverse City, Michigan
- W19FD-D in Terre Haute, Indiana
- W35DY-D in Sterling-Dixon, Illinois
- WAPW-CD in Abingdon, etc., Virginia
- WBWP-LD in West Palm Beach, Florida
- WCAV in Charlottesville, Virginia
- WCLL-CD in Columbus, Ohio
- WDCQ-TV in Bad Axe, Michigan
- WDNI-CD in Indianapolis, Indiana
- WDSF-LD in Montgomery, Alabama
- WEPA-LD in Erie, Pennsylvania
- WEYW-LP in Key West, Florida
- WFND-LD in Findlay, Ohio
- WGCT-LD in Crystal River, Florida
- WGSR-LD in Reidsville, North Carolina
- WHLZ-LD in Harrisburg, Pennsylvania
- WHNT-TV in Huntsville, Alabama
- WHOI in Peoria, Illinois
- WKPT-CD in Kingsport, Tennessee
- WKPT-TV in Kingsport, Tennessee
- WKPZ-CD in Kingsport, Tennessee
- WLOW-LD in Charleston, South Carolina
- WLTX in Columbia, South Carolina
- WMAH-TV in BIloxi, Mississippi
- WMMF-LD in Vero Beach, Florida
- WODR-LD in Wausau, Wisconsin
- WOHZ-CD in Mansfield, Ohio
- WOIO in Shaker Heights, Ohio
- WOPI-CD in Bristol, Virginia/Kingsport, Tennessee
- WOTM-LD in Birmingham, Alabama
- WPED-LD in Jackson, Tennessee
- WPKD-TV in Jeannette, Pennsylvania
- WRDM-CD in Hartford, Connecticut
- WSLN in Freeport, Illinois
- WSPZ-LD in DuBois, Pennsylvania
- WTKJ-LD in Watertown, New York
- WUDL-LD in Detroit, Michigan
- WUNM-TV in Jacksonville, North Carolina
- WVGN-LD in Charlotte Amalie, U.S. Virgin Islands
- WWKQ-LD in Quebradillas, Puerto Rico
- WXIX-TV in Cincinnati, Ohio
- WXOW in La Crosse, Wisconsin
- WYSJ-CD in Yorktown, Virginia
- WZMQ in Marquette, Michigan

The following television stations, which are no longer licensed, formerly operated on virtual channel 19:

- K19IC-D in Eureka, California
- K19MS-D in Alexandra, Minnesota
- K19MZ-D in Arriba, Colorado
- K19NA-D in Idaho Falls, Idaho
- KGRY-LD in Gila River Indian Community, Arizona
- KJII-LD in Lincoln, Nebraska
- W19DV-D in Luquillo, Puerto Rico
- WAPG-CD in Greeneville, Tennessee
- WAZE-TV in Madisonville, Kentucky
- WCDC-TV in Adams, Massachusetts
- WDXA-LD in Florence, South Carolina
- WUEM-LD in Athens, Georgia
