= KAPP (TV) =

Television station in Yakima, Washington

KAPP and KVEW

KAPP: Yakima, Washington; KVEW: Kennewick–Pasco–Richland, Washington; United States
- Channels for KAPP: Digital: 14 (UHF); Virtual: 35
- Channels for KVEW: Digital: 27 (UHF); Virtual: 42
- Branding: Apple Valley News Now

Programming
- Affiliations: 35.1/42.1: ABC; for others, see § Subchannels

Ownership
- Owner: Morgan Murphy Media; (Apple Valley Broadcasting, Inc.)

History
- First air date: KAPP: September 21, 1970; KVEW: October 29, 1970
- Former channel number: KAPP: Analog: 35 (UHF, 1970–2009); KVEW: Analog: 42 (UHF, 1970–2009); Digital: 44 (UHF, 2009–2018)
- Call sign meaning: KAPP: Apple Valley (market is in the heart of Washington's apple industry); KVEW: K-View

Technical information
- Licensing authority: FCC
- Facility ID: KAPP: 2506; KVEW: 2495
- ERP: KAPP: 160 kW; KVEW: 160 kW
- HAAT: KAPP: 287 m (942 ft); KVEW: 405 m (1,329 ft)
- Transmitter coordinates: KAPP: 46°31′56.4″N 120°30′46.5″W; KVEW: 46°6′11.4″N 119°8′0.6″W

Links
- Public license information: KAPP: Public file; LMS; KVEW: Public file; LMS
- Website: www.applevalleynewsnow.com

KAPP (channel 35) in Yakima, Washington, and KVEW (channel 42) in Kennewick, Washington, branded as Apple Valley News Now, are television stations affiliated with ABC and owned by Morgan Murphy Media. KAPP's studios are located on East Yakima Avenue in downtown Yakima, and its transmitter is atop Ahtanum Ridge; KVEW maintains its own studios on North Edison Street in Kennewick, with transmitter on Jump Off Joe Butte. Local news programming originates from the Kennewick studio and the stations have the same programming, but both stations air separate local commercials.

KAPP and KVEW began broadcasting in September and October 1970, respectively, providing Yakima and the Tri-Cities respectively with their third local TV service. Morgan Murphy has owned both stations for their entire existence. Though news programming originates in Kennewick, KVEW has traditionally been reckoned as the semi-satellite of the Yakima station, which was the originating outlet. Major cutbacks in local news were made during the Great Recession, and the original Yakima studio was closed in 2011.

On satellite, KAPP is only available on DirecTV, while Dish Network carries KVEW instead.

== History ==
Before KAPP signed on, CBS affiliate KIMA-TV (channel 29) had carried ABC as a secondary affiliation until KNDO (channel 23) signed on in 1959. KNDO became the area's primary ABC affiliate until 1965, when it switched its primary affiliation to NBC. Both KNDO and KIMA-TV shared ABC's programming from that point until KAPP signed on the air on September 21, 1970, and all ABC programming moved to KAPP. The most notable ABC program shown on the station's first day was the first-ever Monday Night Football game between the Cleveland Browns and New York Jets.

KVEW began serving the Tri-Cities region on October 29, 1970, a month after KAPP signed on. Before KVEW's existence, KEPR-TV (channel 19) had carried ABC as a secondary affiliation until 1959; KNBS-TV (channel 22) operated briefly in nearby Walla Walla, Washington, as an ABC affiliate in 1960; KNDU (channel 25) signed on in 1961 and became the area's primary ABC affiliate until 1965. Both KEPR-TV and KNDU shared ABC programming from that point until KVEW signed on.

KAPP and KVEW began airing Spokane's MeTV affiliate KXMN-LD on a digital subchannel in September 2006. They were two of the remaining stations to sign-off every night, but that practice ended in 2012 when World News Now was added to the programming lineup.

On December 22, 2008, KAPP and KVEW discontinued their 6 p.m. and weekend newscasts. The 11 p.m. newscast was reduced to a five-minute broadcast before Nightline, and post-January 2013, Jimmy Kimmel Live! In addition to this move, 17 employees from KAPP and KVEW were laid off and KAPP's studio, formerly located on South 24th Avenue, was sold off and its operations were relocated downtown.

While weather came from KXLY-TV in Spokane for several years, local weather reports have returned as of 2016, with meteorologist Jason Valentine at 5 and 6:30 p.m., and Kristen Walls during their Good Morning Northwest newscast. With the cancellation of The Insider and Extra moving from 6 to 7:30 p.m. on September 11, 2017, KAPP/KVEW began airing local news at 6 p.m., for the first time in almost a decade.

== Technical information ==
=== Subchannels ===
The stations' signals are multiplexed:

Subchannels of KAPP and KVEW
Subchannel		Res.	Short name		Programming
KAPP	KVEW	Res.	KAPP	KVEW	Programming
35.1	42.1	720p	KAP ABC	KVEW-HD	ABC
35.2	42.2	720p	KAPMETV	KV-METV	MeTV (via KXLY-DT2)
35.3	42.3	480i	KAP H&I	KVEWH&I	Heroes & Icons
35.4	42.4	480i	KPStart	KVSTART	Start TV
35.5	42.5	480i	KAPDABL	KV-DABL	MyNetworkTV
35.6	42.6	480i	KAP QVC	KVEWQVC	QVC
35.7	42.7	480i	KAP HSN	KVEWHSN	HSN

KAPP and KVEW have been digital-only since February 17, 2009.

=== Translators ===
- K20JL-D Ellensburg (translates KAPP)
- K14HT-D Walla Walla (translates KVEW)
