= Fisher Communications =

American media company

Fisher Communications, Inc.
- Formerly: Fisher Companies Inc. (1971-2001)
- Type: Public
- Traded as: Nasdaq: FSCI
- Industry: Broadcasting, Television, Radio
- Predecessor: Fisher Flouring Mills Co.
- Founded: April 4, 1910; 116 years ago (as Fisher Flouring Mills Co.); 1971; 55 years ago (as Fisher Companies)
- Defunct: August 8, 2013; 13 years ago
- Fate: Acquired by Sinclair
- Successor: Sinclair Broadcast Group
- Headquarters: Seattle, Washington, United States
- Key people: Colleen Brown (president & CEO); Michael D. Wortsman (chair); Robert I. (Rob) Dunlop (EVP & Ops)
- Revenue: $164.0M (▲6.8%) 2011
- Net income: $36.4M (▲273.8%) 2011
- Number of employees: 784 (▲5.3%) 2011

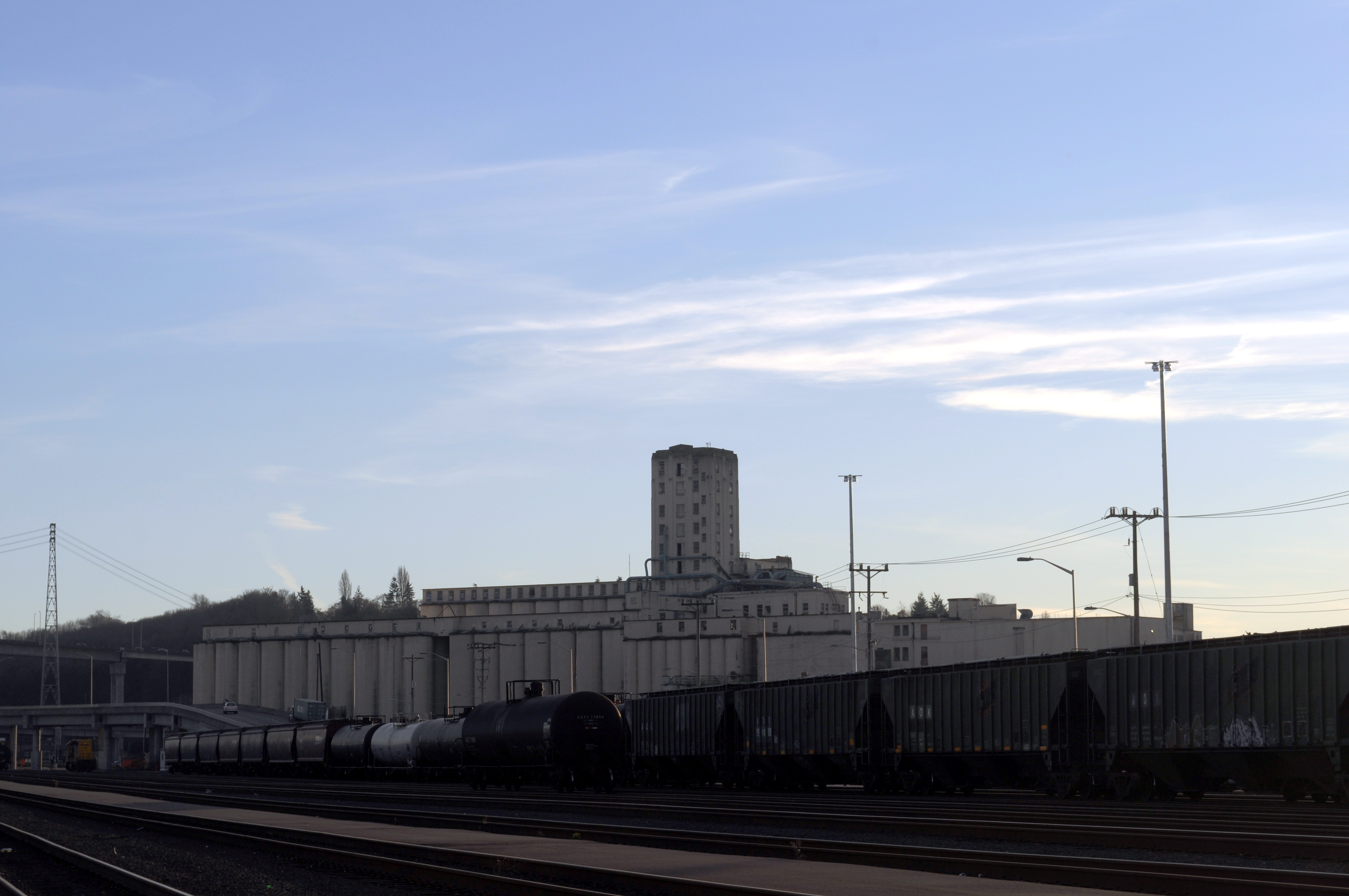
Before they were in broadcasting, the Fisher fortune rested on the Fisher Flour Mill on Seattle's Harbor Island, founded 1910.

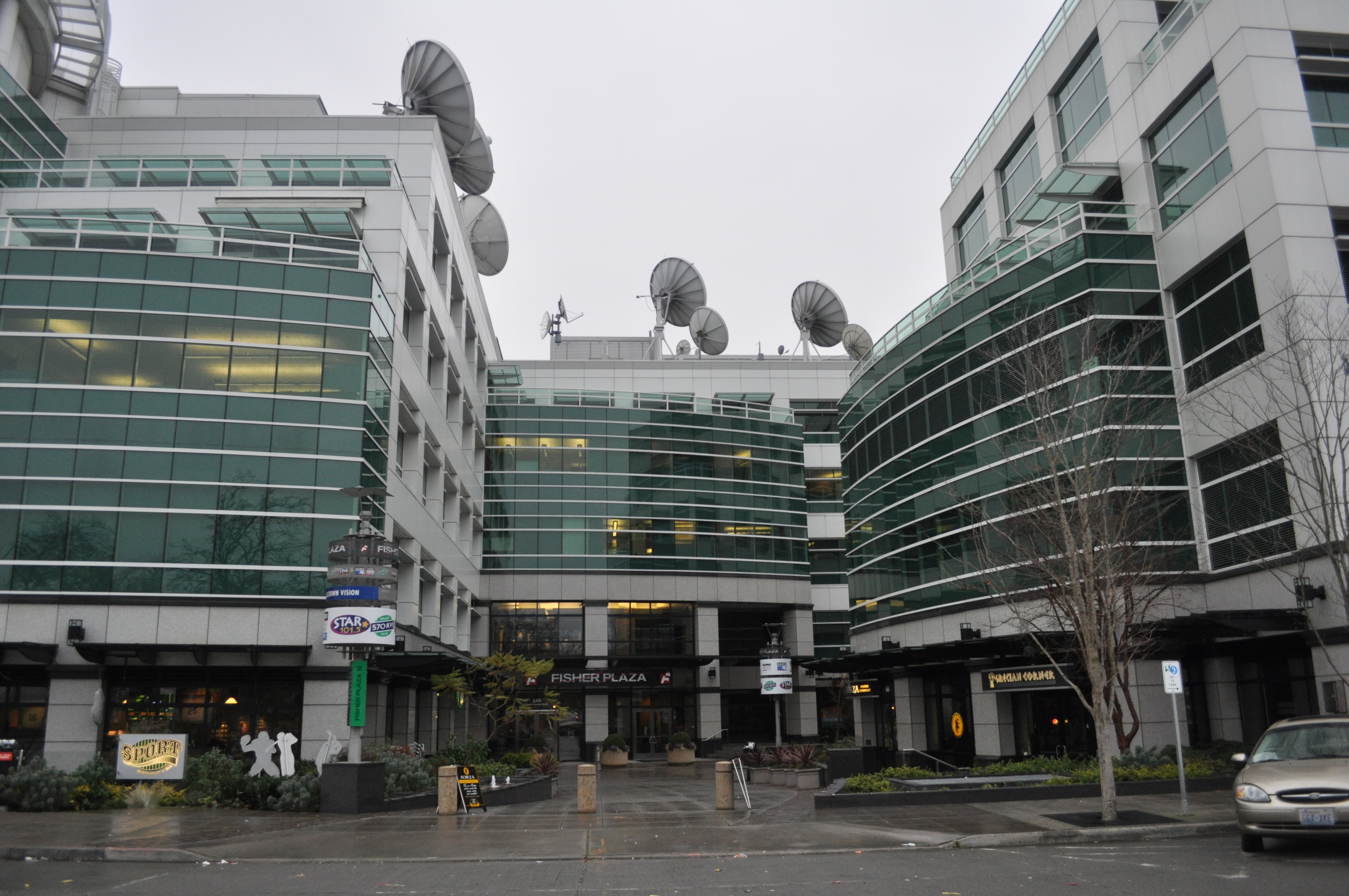
Fisher Plaza, the company's headquarters.

Fisher Communications, Inc. was a media company in the United States. Based in Seattle, Washington, the company primarily owned a number of radio and television stations in the Western United States. It was the last company in the Seattle area to own a local TV station before being acquired by Sinclair Broadcast Group in 2013. Prior to 2001, it was a conglomerate with businesses in broadcasting, flour milling and real estate.

== History ==
See also KNWN (AM)

Fisher Companies, Inc.'s Fisher Communications by 1998 owned 25 radio stations and 2 TV stations. Fisher Companies also owned a flour milling and food distribution company and real estate development subsidiary.

In 1999 Retlaw Enterprises (a company owned by the relatives of Walt Disney) sold its remaining 11 television stations to Fisher Communications, including all of the related assets to those properties for $215 million in cash. Its broadcasting unit, until the 2000s, was Fisher Broadcasting. Also that year, Fisher is launching its own entertainment division, Fisher Entertainment, to be headed by Alan Winters, a syndication executive.

Fisher began to sell many of its properties in the mid-2000s, including real estate, its longtime flour milling operation, and its stake in Safeco. By 2011, Fisher Communications was down to 10 radio stations. On April 11, 2013, Fisher (which by then owned 20 television stations and only three radio stations) announced that it would be acquired by the Sinclair Broadcast Group. However, the deal was subject to financial scrutiny; the law firm Levi & Korsinsky notified Fisher shareholders with accusations that Fisher's board of directors were breaching fiduciary duties by "failing to adequately shop the Company before agreeing to enter into the transaction", and Sinclair was underpaying for Fisher's stock. Shortly after the announcement, a lawsuit was filed by a Fisher shareholder; the suit was settled in July 2013, on August 6 Fisher's shareholders approved the merger. The FCC granted its approval of the sale of August 7. On August 8, Sinclair announced that the sale was completed.

== Final stations ==
- Stations are arranged in alphabetical order by state and city of license.
- Two boldface asterisks appearing following a station's call letters (**) indicate a station built and signed on by Fisher Communications.

Stations owned by Fisher Communications
Media market	State	Station	Purchased	Sold	Notes
Bakersfield	California	KBAK-TV	2008	2013	
Bakersfield	California	KBFX-CD	2008	2013	
Fresno–Visalia	California	KJEO	1999	2000	
Augusta	Georgia	WFXG	1999	2003	
Columbus	Georgia	WXTX	1999	2003	
Boise	Idaho	KBOI-TV	1999	2013	
Boise	Idaho	KYUU-LD	2006	2013	
Idaho Falls–Pocatello	Idaho	KIDK	1999	2013	
Idaho Falls–Pocatello	Idaho	KXPI-LD	2006	2013	
Lewiston	Idaho	KLEW-TV	1999	2013	(Note: Semi-satellite of KIMA.)
Billings	Montana	KBLG	1994	2006	
Billings	Montana	KRKX	1994	2006	
Billings	Montana	KRZN **	1998	2006	
Billings	Montana	KYYA	1994	2006	
Butte	Montana	KAAR	1994	2006	
Butte	Montana	KMBR	1994	2006	
Butte	Montana	KXTL	1994	2006	
Great Falls	Montana	KAAK	1994	2011	
Great Falls	Montana	KIKF **	2001	2011	
Great Falls	Montana	KINX **	2002	2011	
Great Falls	Montana	KQDI	2001	2011	
Great Falls	Montana	KQDI-FM	2001	2011	
Great Falls	Montana	KXGF	1994	2011	
Missoula	Montana	KBQQ	2003	2006	
Missoula	Montana	KGGL	1994	2006	
Missoula	Montana	KGRZ	1994	2006	
Missoula	Montana	KXDR	1998	2006	
Missoula	Montana	KYLT	1991	2006	
Missoula	Montana	KZOQ-FM	1996	2006	
Bend	Oregon	KABH-CA	2006	2013	(Note: Satellite of KUNP.) (Note: Owned by a third party and operated by Fisher.)
Coos Bay	Oregon	KCBY-TV	1999	2013	(Note: Satellite of KVAL.)
Coos Bay	Oregon	KMCB	2013	2013	(Note: Satellite of KMTR.)
Eugene	Oregon	KVAL-TV	1999	2013	
Eugene	Oregon	KMTR	2013	2013	
Portland	Oregon	KATU **	1962	2013	
Portland	Oregon	KOTK	1996	2003	
Portland	Oregon	KUNP	2006	2013	
Portland	Oregon	KWJJ-FM	1996	2003	
Roseburg	Oregon	KPIC	1999	2013	
Roseburg	Oregon	KTCW	2013	2013	
Ellensburg	Washington	KWWA-CA	2007	2008	(Note: Satellite of KUNW.)
Kennewick	Washington	KVVK-CD	2007	2013	
Pasco	Washington	KEPR-TV	1999	2013	
Seattle–Tacoma	Washington	KOMO **	1926	2013	
Seattle–Tacoma	Washington	KOMO-FM	2009	2013	
Seattle–Tacoma	Washington	KOMO-TV **	1953	2013	
Seattle–Tacoma	Washington	KPLZ-FM	1994	2013	
Seattle–Tacoma	Washington	KUNS-TV	2006	2013	
Seattle–Tacoma	Washington	KVI	1994	2013	
Wenatchee	Washington	KAPP	1994	2006	(Note: Known as KXAA prior to 2000.)
Wenatchee	Washington	KWWW-FM	1992	2006	
Wenatchee	Washington	KWWX	1992	2006	
Wenatchee	Washington	KYSN	1994	2006	
Wenatchee	Washington	KZPH	1997	2006	
Yakima	Washington	KIMA-TV	1999	2013	
Yakima	Washington	KUNW-CD	2007	2013	
Walla Walla	Washington	KORX-CA	2007	2013	

== Contract dispute ==
On December 17, 2008, Fisher Communications' contract expired with Dish Network. As a result of this contract dispute, stations owned by Fisher Communications were no longer available to Dish Network subscribers. Dish Network claimed that Fisher is asking for over an 80% increase. The Fisher stations that returned to Dish Network are: KOMO and KUNS in Seattle.; KATU and KUNP in Portland.; KIMA in Yakima, Washington.; KVAL in Eugene, Oregon.; KBCI (now KBOI) in Boise, Idaho; KIDK in Idaho Falls, Idaho; and KBAK and KBFX in Bakersfield, California. Dish Network restored the service to their customers at 10:25 p.m. PST on June 10.
