= KFFX-TV =

Television station in Pendleton, Oregon

- Pendleton, Oregon; Pasco–Richland–Kennewick, Washington; United States
- City: Pendleton, Oregon
- Channels: Digital: 11 (VHF); Virtual: 11

Programming
- Affiliations: 11.1: Roar; 11.2: Telemundo; 11.3: Ion

Ownership
- Owner: Standard Media; (Community News Media LLC)
- Sister stations: KEPR-TV, KVVK-CD

History
- First air date: January 11, 1999
- Former call signs: KAUP (January–April 1999)
- Former channel numbers: Analog: 11 (VHF, 1999–2009); Digital: 8 (VHF, until 2009)
- Former affiliations: Fox (1999–2026)
- Call sign meaning: "Fox"

Technical information
- Licensing authority: FCC
- Facility ID: 12729
- ERP: 60 kW
- HAAT: 471 m (1,545 ft)
- Transmitter coordinates: 45°44′51.1″N 118°2′18.6″W
- Translator(s): KBWU-LD 36 Richland, WA

Links
- Public license information: Public file; LMS

KFFX-TV (channel 11) is a television station licensed to Pendleton, Oregon, United States, serving the Tri-Cities of Washington as an affiliate of Roar and Telemundo. It is the only major commercial station in the Yakima–Tri-Cities market that is licensed to the Oregon side of the station's coverage area. KFFX-TV is owned by Standard Media and operated alongside CBS/CW+/Fox affiliate KEPR-TV (channel 19) and Univision affiliate KVVK-CD (channel 15). KFFX-TV's studios are located on Clearwater Avenue in Kennewick, Washington, and its transmitter is located in the Umatilla National Forest east of Pendleton.

Like the other stations in this vast and mountainous area, KFFX-TV's transmitter is not strong enough to cover the entire market. While KFFX-TV serves the market's eastern portion, it operates KCYU-LD (channel 41) in Yakima as a low-power semi-satellite for the western portion. KCYU-LD simulcasts all Roar programming as provided through its parent station, with the only difference being the hourly station identification as Roar uses a master default schedule. On satellite, KFFX-TV is only available on DirecTV, while Dish Network carries KCYU-LD instead.

== History ==
Channel 11 signed on the air January 11, 1999, as KAUP, a Fox affiliate; on April 5, the call letters were changed to KFFX-TV. It was the first full-powered VHF station in what had previously been a "UHF island". It was also the first station on the Tri-Cities side of the market not to be a satellite of a station in Yakima.

The station replaced KBWU-LP (channel 66), a low-power semi-satellite of KAYU-TV in Spokane (which was carried by cable providers throughout southeastern Washington and northeastern Oregon); KCYU-LP was also a semi-satellite of KAYU before the launch of KFFX. KBWU (which originally had the call sign K66BW, though it was referred to as "KBW" outside of station identifications) had been on the air since October 1, 1989; that station, now KBWU-LD (channel 36), is now a translator of KFFX.

Initially, the KFFX-TV license was owned by Communication Properties; Northwest Broadcasting, through its Mountain Broadcasting subsidiary, operated the station under a local marketing agreement. Northwest filed to acquire KFFX outright in November 1999; however, the sale, approved on September 27, 2000, was not completed until January 14, 2003, because Northwest was required to divest another full-power television station in the Tri-Cities market, KBKI (channel 9, later known as KCWK) in Walla Walla, in order to complete its purchase of KFFX. KBKI was ultimately acquired by Pappas Telecasting.

In February 2019, Reuters reported that Apollo Global Management had agreed to acquire the entirety of Brian Brady's television portfolio, which it intended to merge with Cox Media Group (which Apollo acquired at the same time) and stations spun off from Nexstar Media Group's purchase of Tribune Broadcasting, once the purchases were approved by the Federal Communications Commission (FCC). In March 2019 filings with the FCC, Apollo confirmed that its newly-formed broadcasting group, Terrier Media, would acquire Northwest Broadcasting, with Brian Brady holding an unspecified minority interest in Terrier. In June 2019, it was announced that Terrier Media would instead operate as Cox Media Group, as Apollo had reached a deal to also acquire Cox's radio and advertising businesses. The transaction was completed on December 17.

On March 29, 2022, Cox Media Group announced it would sell KFFX-TV, KCYU-LD and 16 other stations to Imagicomm Communications, an affiliate of the parent company of the INSP cable channel, for $488 million; the sale was completed on August 1.

On April 3, 2025, Imagicomm announced that it would sell seven stations, including KFFX-TV and KCYU-LD, to Todd Parkin's Rincon Broadcasting Group; the deal was consummated on July 18. In March 2026, Community News Media LLC, which operates as Standard Media Group and is led by Soohyung Kim with Deborah McDermott as chief executive, agreed to acquire Rincon Broadcasting's stations, including KFFX-TV and KCYU-LD, for $116.5 million; the sale was completed on October 1.

On April 1, 2026, KFFX's intellectual unit (Fox affiliation, branding, and syndicated programming) moved to the third subchannel of KEPR-TV. As a result, Roar moved to KFFX's main subchannel.

== Newscasts ==
KFFX-TV airs a nightly newscast, Fox First at Ten. The newscast is produced weeknights by NBC affiliate KNDU (channel 25); on weekends, KFFX carries the 10 p.m. newscast from Spokane sister station KAYU-TV (produced by KNDU's sister KHQ-TV). KFFX also airs KAYU's KHQ-produced Good Day on weekday mornings.

== Technical information ==
=== Subchannels ===
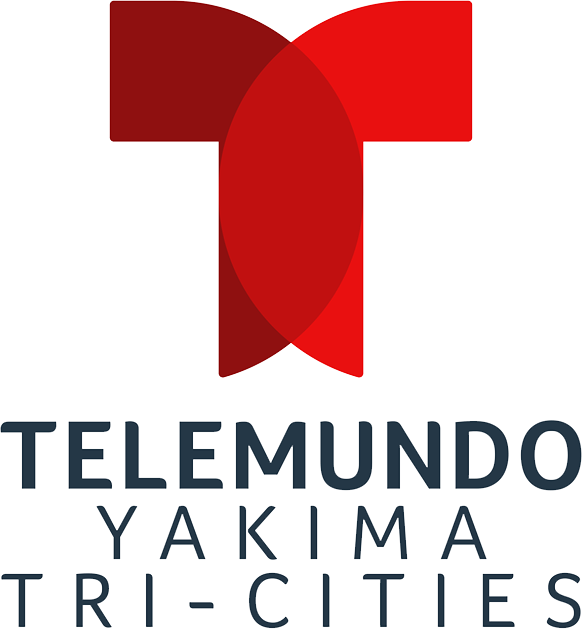
Logo for Telemundo subchannel

The station's signal is multiplexed:

Subchannels of KFFX-TV
Subchannel	Res.	Short name	Programming
11.1	720p	KFFX-HD	Roar
11.2	720p	Telmund	Telemundo
11.3	480i	ION	Ion

KFFX has been digital-only since February 17, 2009. As the station's transmitter site typically becomes inaccessible to standard vehicles due to eastern Oregon's typically harsh winters, Northwest Broadcasting provided station engineers with snowmobiles on February 16, 2009, to complete the final post-transition installations.

On April 21, 2009, the station added a digital subchannel which includes This TV, but was changed to Telemundo in 2016.

=== Translators ===
- K26NF-D Ellensburg, WA
- K19BY-D Grangeville, ID
- K23FH-D Milton-Freewater
- K34MZ-D Prosser, WA
- KBWU-LD Richland, WA
- KCYU-LD Yakima, WA
