= KRLB-LD =

Television station in Richland, Washington

KRLB-LD and KWWO-LD

KRLB-LD: Richland, Washington; KWWO-LD: Walla Walla, Washington; United States
- Channels for KRLB-LD: Digital: 29 (UHF); Virtual: 29
- Channels for KWWO-LD: Digital: 32 (UHF); Virtual: 47
- Branding: Radiant Light Broadcasting

Programming
- Affiliations: TBN

Ownership
- Owner: Radiant Light Broadcasting

History
- Founded: KRLB-LD: January 1985
- First air date: KRLB-LD: December 18, 1989; KWWO-LD: November 19, 1996
- Former call signs: KRLB-LD: K66BW (CP, 1985–1989); K49CN (1989–2000); KRLB-LP (2000–2009); KWWO-LD: K47EV (1996–2000); KWWO-LP (2000–2009)
- Former channel number: KRLB-LD: Analog: 49 (UHF, 1989–2009); Digital: 49 (UHF, 2009–2018); KWWO-LD: Analog: 47 (UHF, 1996–2009); Digital: 47 (UHF, 2009–2018)
- Former affiliations: Cornerstone Television
- Call sign meaning: KRLB-LD: "Keep Radiant Light Burning"

Technical information
- Licensing authority: FCC
- Facility ID: KRLB-LD: 54455; KWWO-LD: 54456
- Class: LD
- ERP: KRLB-LD: 4.9 kW; KWWO-LD: 3.5 kW
- HAAT: KRLB-LD: 270.1 m (886 ft); KWWO-LD: 194.9 m (639 ft)
- Transmitter coordinates: KRLB-LD: 46°14′7.3″N 119°19′17.3″W; KWWO-LD: 45°47′59.9″N 118°22′39.5″W

Links
- Public license information: KRLB-LD: LMS
- Website: www.rlb.org

KRLB-LD (channel 29) is a low-power religious television station in Richland, Washington, United States, affiliated with the Trinity Broadcasting Network. Owned by Radiant Light Broadcasting, the station is relayed full-time on KWWO-LD (channel 47) in Walla Walla, Washington.

This station is not related to WRLM in Canton, Ohio, whose licensee name is the similar Radiant Life Ministries.

== History ==
Radiant Light Broadcasting began broadcasting as K66BW, a translator for the national Trinity Broadcasting Network, in January 1985. In July 1989, it moved to channel 49 and became K49CN, branded "KRLB". KRLB was later added to the cable system in the Tri-Cities and even reinstated after viewer outcry followed its removal in 1996. In 2001, the transmitter at Badger Mountain suffered vandalism, leaving the station temporarily unable to present local programming.

As of March 17, 2009, KRLB broadcasts only in digital.
