= KUNW-CD =

Television station in Yakima, Washington

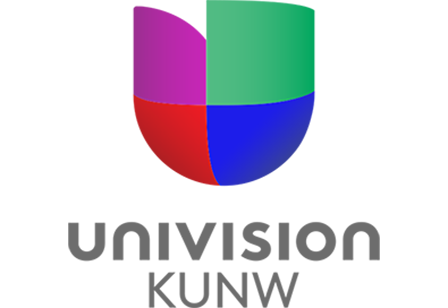
- Yakima, Washington; United States
- Channels: Digital: 30 (UHF); Virtual: 2
- Branding: KUNW Univision

Programming
- Affiliations: 2.1: Univision; for others, see § Subchannels

Ownership
- Owner: Sinclair Broadcast Group; (Sinclair Kennewick Licensee, LLC)
- Operator: Standard Media
- Sister stations: KIMA-TV; KEPR-TV; KLEW-TV

History
- Founded: November 8, 1993
- First air date: March 4, 1996
- Former call signs: Analog: K66EU (1996–1997); K52EQ (1997–2001); KKFQ-LP (2001); KKFQ-CA (2001–2008); KUNW-CA (2008); KUNW-LP (2008–2012); Digital: KKFQ-LD (2007–2008); KUNW-LD (2008–2012)
- Former channel numbers: Analog: 66 (UHF, 1996–1997), 52 (UHF, 1997–2001), 2 (VHF, 2001–2012)
- Former affiliations: Telemundo (1996–2003)
- Call sign meaning: "Univision Northwest"

Technical information
- Licensing authority: FCC
- Facility ID: 167797
- Class: CD
- ERP: 15 kW
- HAAT: 287 m (942 ft)
- Transmitter coordinates: 46°31′40.0″N 120°33′6.0″W
- Translator(s): KVVK-CD 15 Kennewick; KORX-CD 16 Walla Walla

Links
- Public license information: Public file; LMS
- Website: www.triyaknews.com

KUNW-CD (channel 2) is a low-power, Class A television station in Yakima, Washington, United States, affiliated with the Spanish-language network Univision. It is owned by Sinclair Broadcast Group alongside CBS, CW+, and Fox affiliate KIMA-TV (channel 29); both stations are operated by Community News Media as sisters to KCYU-LD (channel 41). KUNW-CD and KIMA-TV share studios on Terrace Heights Boulevard in Yakima; KUNW-CD's transmitter is located on Ahtanum Ridge.

== History ==
The station was a Telemundo affiliate the time it changed call signs from K52EQ to KKFQ-LP and moved from UHF channel 52 to VHF channel 2 on January 4, 2001. By 2003, KKFQ was a simulcast of KPOU, the Univision affiliate in La Grande, Oregon.

WatchTV sold KKFQ-CA, along with KVVK-CA in Kennewick, KWWA-CA in Ellensburg, and KORX-CA in Walla Walla, to Fisher Communications in 2007. Fisher had already programmed the stations under a local marketing agreement since 2006. In 2008, Fisher changed the station's call sign to KUNW-LP to reflect its Univision affiliation and its location in the Pacific Northwest.

On April 11, 2013, Fisher Communications announced that it would sell its properties, including KUNW and KIMA, to the Sinclair Broadcast Group. The deal was completed on August 8, 2013.

== Technical information ==
=== Subchannels ===
The station's signal is multiplexed:

Subchannels of KUNW-CD, KVVK-CD, and KORX-CD
Subchannel		Res.	Short name	Programming
KUNW-CD	KVVK-CD/ KORX-CD	Res.	Short name	Programming
2.1	15.1	1080i	Univisi	Univision
2.2	15.2	480i	Comet	Comet (4:3)
2.3	15.3	480i	TheNest	The Nest
2.4	15.4	480i	Charge!	Charge!

=== Translators ===
KUNW's programming is also seen on two additional stations, both serving the Tri-Cities area of Richland, Pasco, and Kennewick:

Translators of KUNW-CD
Station	City of license	Digital channel	Former callsigns	First air date	Facility ID	ERP	HAAT	Transmitter coordinates	Public license information
KVVK-CD	Kennewick	15 (UHF)	K60FX (1995–2001); KVVK-LP (2001); KVVK-CA (2001–2010)	March 15, 1996	25358	15 kW	349 m (1,145 ft)	46°5′50″N 119°11′33″W	Public file; LMS
KORX-CD	Walla Walla	16 (UHF)	K16DD (1992–2001); KORX-LP (2001); KORX-CA (2001–2015)	March 4, 1996	71072	1 kW	407.8 m (1,338 ft)	45°59′3.4″N 118°10′11.8″W	Public file; LMS

An additional station, KWWA-CA (channel 49, originally K49EI from 1996 to 2001 and KWWA-LP from 2001 to 2003), previously served Ellensburg. However, the station signed off April 17, 2008, after suffering antenna failure. Fisher opted to return the license to the Federal Communications Commission (FCC) instead of repairing the antenna, and KWWA's license was canceled on June 4, 2008.
