= KAYU-TV =

Television station in Spokane, Washington

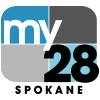
- Spokane, Washington; Coeur d'Alene, Idaho; United States
- City: Spokane, Washington
- Channels: Digital: 28 (UHF); Virtual: 28
- Branding: Fox 28; My 28 Spokane (28.2)

Programming
- Affiliations: 28.1: Fox; 28.2: Antenna TV/MyTV

Ownership
- Owner: Standard Media; (Community News Media LLC)
- Operator: Morgan Murphy Media
- Sister stations: KXLY-TV

History
- First air date: October 31, 1982
- Former channel numbers: Analog: 28 (UHF, 1982–2009); Digital: 30 (UHF, until 2009)
- Former affiliations: Independent (1982–1986); UPN (secondary, 1995–1997)

Technical information
- Licensing authority: FCC
- Facility ID: 58684
- ERP: 445 kW
- HAAT: 601 m (1,972 ft)
- Transmitter coordinates: 47°34′44″N 117°17′50″W
- Translator(s): see § Translators

Links
- Public license information: Public file; LMS
- Website: Official website

KAYU-TV (channel 28) is a television station in Spokane, Washington, United States, affiliated with Fox and MyNetworkTV. The station is owned by Standard Media and operated by Morgan Murphy Media alongside ABC affiliate KXLY-TV (channel 4). The station has studios on South Regal Street in Spokane, and its transmitter is on Krell Hill southeast of the city.

== History ==
After beating out Springfield Television for the construction permit in 1981, Spokane native Robert Hamacher, a former employee of KREM-TV and later an executive at KSTW in Tacoma, put KAYU on the air on October 31, 1982. The first program to air was an episode of Rawhide. It was Spokane's first independent station and the first new commercial station to sign on in the area since KREM-TV began broadcasting 28 years earlier. It is also the oldest non-Big Three station in the eastern part of the state. It joined Fox as a charter affiliate on October 9, 1986.

On October 1, 1989, KAYU-TV launched two low-power semi-satellites: K53CY in Yakima (known on-air as "KCY") and K66BW in the Tri-Cities (branded as "KBW"). Both stations aired most of KAYU's programming (with the exception of select programs that KAYU did not have the rights to show in those markets), though with local commercials. K53CY was replaced in 1993 by K68EB, though it continued to go by "KCY" outside of station identifications.

Hamacher's company, Salmon River Communications sold KAYU-TV, along with K68EB (which was soon renamed KCYU-LP), KBWU-LP (the former K66BW), and KMVU in Medford, Oregon, to Northwest Broadcasting, a company controlled by Brian Brady, in 1995. Hamacher became chief operating officer of Northwest Broadcasting, netting a handsome return on his investment of 15 years earlier. KCYU and KBWU remained semi-satellites of KAYU until 1999, when full-power sister station KFFX-TV signed on from Pendleton, Oregon, and became their program source.

KAYU also carried UPN as a secondary affiliation from the network's launch on January 16, 1995, to 1997 when KSKN (channel 22) became the network's new affiliate.

On December 17, 2019, Apollo Global Management acquired the entirety of Brian Brady's television portfolio, as part of a larger transaction that saw it also acquire Cox Media Group. While the company was initially to be known as Terrier Media, it had been announced in June 2019 that Apollo would also acquire Cox's radio and advertising businesses, and maintain the existing Cox Media Group name for the combined company. Brady holds an unspecified minority interest in the company, which gave KAYU an in-state sister station in Seattle's CBS affiliate KIRO-TV.

On March 29, 2022, Cox Media Group announced it would sell KAYU-TV and 17 other stations to Imagicomm Communications, an affiliate of the parent company of the INSP cable channel, for $488 million; the sale was completed on August 1.

On April 3, 2025, Imagicomm announced that it would sell seven stations, including KAYU-TV, to Todd Parkin's Rincon Broadcasting Group; the deal was consummated on July 18. In March 2026, Community News Media LLC, which operates as Standard Media Group and is led by Soohyung Kim with Deborah McDermott as chief executive, agreed to acquire Rincon Broadcasting's stations, including KAYU-TV, for $116.5 million; the sale was completed on October 1.

On June 1, 2026, it was announced that Morgan Murphy Media—owner of ABC affiliate KXLY-TV (channel 4) and seven Spokane radio stations—would begin operating KAYU-TV under a local marketing agreement (LMA), effective immediately; KAYU already airs a KXLY-produced 10 p.m. newscast.

=== KAYU-DT2 (My 28 Spokane) ===
KAYU-TV's 28.2 subchannel broadcasts MyNetworkTV in early prime time; the remainder of the subchannel's schedule consists of Antenna TV programming. Comcast Xfinity carries the subchannel on digital channel 115.

It originally carried This TV until March 2015, when it switched to MyNetworkTV, which was previously carried on KXLY-DT2 until October 2012 when it became an exclusive MeTV affiliate.

In November 2017, the 28.2 subchannel was upgraded to 720p HD; it had previously been offered in 480i 4:3 standard definition.

KAYU-DT2 became an alternate affiliate of The CW on February 25, 2023, when it began carrying the network's coverage of LIV Golf due to KSKN owner Tegna's refusal to air the controversial Saudi-owned tour on its stations.

== Newscasts ==
KAYU presently broadcasts 13 1/2 hours of locally produced newscasts each week (with 2 1/2 hours each weekday and a half-hour each on Saturdays and Sundays).

KAYU currently broadcasts a 10 p.m. newscast produced by ABC affiliate KXLY-TV, which airs for 35 minutes on weeknights and a half-hour on Saturdays and Sunday evenings. The station also aired a half-hour show called Washington's Most Wanted, a statewide version of the former Fox series America's Most Wanted, featuring profiles of wanted criminals in Washington state, it was hosted by KCPQ weeknight anchor David Rose and produced by KCPQ.

On April 8, 1991, KAYU began broadcasting a 10 p.m. newscast, produced by CBS affiliate KREM (channel 2) under a news share agreement. Lower-than-expected ratings caused KREM to drop out of the news share agreement in 1993, upon which NBC affiliate KHQ-TV (channel 6) signed a news share agreement with KAYU. The KHQ-produced newscast ceased production April 14, 1995. In 1999, KAYU began producing an in-house 10 p.m. newscast, that ran until 2004; in its final two years, KXLY-TV assisted in content and talent.

In 2004, KAYU laid off its news staff and partnered with KHQ for the second time to produce the newscast, which was renamed Fox First at Ten. The reduced overhead allowed the newscast to make money in its second month on air. On January 5, 2015, KAYU became the second news station in Spokane to air their news from 7 to 9 a.m. called Good Day Spokane, after KREM had debuted a morning news extension on KSKN the year before. Production of KAYU's newscasts were taken over by KXLY-TV on March 1, 2026, retaining the same timeslots but renamed to reflect KXLY's 4 News Now branding (with the morning newscast serving as an extension of KXLY's Good Morning Northwest).

== Technical information ==
=== Subchannels ===
The station's signal is multiplexed:

Subchannels of KAYU-TV
Subchannel	Res.	Short name	Programming
28.1	720p	KAYU-HD	Fox
28.2	720p	MyNetTV	Antenna TV (primary); MyNetworkTV (secondary)

=== Analog-to-digital conversion ===
KAYU-TV ended regular programming on its analog signal, over UHF channel 28, on February 17, 2009, the original target date on which full-power television stations in the United States were to transition from analog to digital broadcasts under federal mandate (which was later pushed back to June 12, 2009). The station's digital signal relocated from its pre-transition UHF channel 30 to channel 28.

=== Translators ===
KAYU-TV is rebroadcast on the following translator stations:

- K17NZ-D Bonners Ferry, ID
- K08AP-D Brewster & Pateros
- K24LM-D Bridgeport
- K25NY-D Bridgeport
- K13ER-D Cashmere
- K27NC-D Coeur d'Alene, ID
- K11UN-D Coolin, ID
- K33QB-D Coolin, ID
- K11WY-D Coulee City
- K23OT-D Juliaetta, ID
- K02RJ-D Kalispell & Lakeside, MT
- K09ZA-D Leavenworth
- K18LH-D Lewiston, ID
- KWVC-LD Malaga
- K10DK-D Malott–Wakefield
- K31AH-D Omak, etc.
- K19AU-D Omak, Okanogan, etc.
- K05NE-D Polson, MT
- K08CY-D Riverside
- K33LW-D Sandpoint, ID
- K10DL-D Tonasket

== Out-of-market coverage ==
KAYU-TV is carried on cable systems in Calgary and Edmonton, Alberta, Canada, both of which are double the size of the station's American coverage area. KAYU-TV is one of five local Spokane area television stations seen in Canada on the Shaw Direct satellite service. It can also be seen on local cable systems in eastern British Columbia. KAYU-TV is one of two Spokane-based stations that can be viewed in The Bahamas via cable, alongside KXLY-TV.
