= KIMA-TV =

Television station in Yakima, Washington

- Yakima, Washington; United States
- Channels: Digital: 33 (UHF); Virtual: 29
- Branding: KIMA; TriYak News; CW 9 Yakima–Tri-Cities (29.2); Fox Yakima 29.3 (29.3)

Programming
- Affiliations: 29.1: CBS; 29.2: CW+; 29.3: Fox

Ownership
- Owner: Sinclair Broadcast Group; (Sinclair Yakima Licensee, LLC)
- Operator: Standard Media
- Sister stations: KEPR-TV; KLEW-TV; KUNW-CD; KCYU-LD; KFFX-TV

History
- First air date: July 19, 1953
- Former channel numbers: Analog: 29 (UHF, 1953–2009)
- Former affiliations: All secondary: DuMont (1953–1955); NBC (1953–1965); ABC (1953–1959, 1965–1970)
- Call sign meaning: Yakima

Technical information
- Licensing authority: FCC
- Facility ID: 56033
- ERP: 100 kW
- HAAT: 292 m (958 ft)
- Transmitter coordinates: 46°31′57″N 120°30′37″W

Links
- Public license information: Public file; LMS
- Website: www.triyaknews.com

KIMA-TV (channel 29) is a television station in Yakima, Washington, United States, affiliated with CBS, The CW Plus, and Fox. It is owned by Sinclair Broadcast Group alongside Univision affiliate KUNW-CD (channel 2); both stations are operated by Standard Media as sisters to KCYU-LD (channel 41). KIMA-TV and KUNW-CD share studios on Terrace Heights Boulevard (east of I-82) in Yakima; KIMA-TV's transmitter is located on Ahtanum Ridge.

KIMA operates two semi-satellites—KEPR-TV (channel 19) in Pasco (serving the Tri-Cities) and KLEW-TV (channel 3) in Lewiston, Idaho. They simulcast all network and syndicated programming as provided through KIMA, but air separate commercial inserts, legal identifications and early evening newscasts, and have their own websites. Master control and some internal operations for the four stations are based at KOMO Plaza (formerly Fisher Plaza) in Seattle.

On satellite, Dish Network and DirecTV carry both KIMA-TV and KEPR-TV.

== History ==
KIMA-TV signed on July 19, 1953, as the 200th television station in the United States and the first in central Washington. The station was originally owned by Cascade Broadcasting Company along with KIMA radio (AM 1460, later KUTI). It carried programming from all four networks–CBS, NBC, ABC and DuMont–but has always been a primary CBS affiliate.

KIMA-TV lost DuMont when that network shut down in 1955, then lost ABC when KNDO signed on in 1959 as a primary ABC affiliate. When KNDO switched affiliations to NBC in 1965, the two stations shared ABC until 1970, when KAPP signed on and took over ABC, leaving KIMA to become a full-time CBS affiliate.

Just before KIMA-TV signed on, the Federal Communications Commission (FCC) collapsed all of central Washington–including the Tri-Cities–into one giant television market. It soon became apparent that channel 29 was not nearly strong enough to cover this vast and mountainous area by itself. With this in mind, in 1954 Cascade signed on KEPR-TV as the first satellite station in the United States. It was originally intended to be a full repeater of KIMA-TV, but due to popular demand it became more of a local station.

At one point, KIMA-TV also had a satellite station in Ephrata, Washington. KBAS-TV signed on the air February 15, 1957, on channel 43; it moved to channel 16 in 1958. KBAS was owned by Basin TV Company, a subsidiary of Cascade Broadcasting, and this was reflected in its call letters. KBAS shut down on November 30, 1961.

Filmways agreed to purchase Cascade Broadcasting for $3 million in 1968; the sale was approved the following year. Cascade's previous owners retained the company's radio stations, which by this point also included the construction permit for KIMA-FM 107.3 (now KFFM), under the name Yakima Valley Communications. Filmways sold KIMA-TV, KEPR-TV, and KLEW-TV to NWG Broadcasting for $1 million in 1972. Retlaw Enterprises acquired the NWG stations for $17 million in 1986; the stations were operated as part of the Retlaw Broadcasting division. Fisher Communications purchased the Retlaw stations in 1999.

On March 31, 2009, KIMA launched a digital subchannel affiliated with The CW to fill the void left by KCWK (channel 9) going dark at the end of May 2008 due to the Pappas Telecasting bankruptcy. The new channel took KCWK's former Channel 9 position on local cable systems and carries the CW Plus schedule.

On April 11, 2013, Fisher announced that it would sell its properties, including KIMA-TV, to the Sinclair Broadcast Group. The deal was completed on August 8, 2013.

On February 1, 2026, Sinclair and Rincon Broadcasting Group, owner of then-Fox affiliates KCYU-LD and KFFX-TV, entered into joint sales, management and shared services agreements allowing Rincon to provide sales, programming, and other services to KIMA and KEPR. In March 2026, Rincon president Todd Parkin filed to transfer Rincon Broadcasting to Standard Media, an affiliate of Standard General.

== News operation ==
KIMA offers the only local Yakima-focused newscast with a fully operational newsroom in Yakima weekdays at 5 and 6 p.m. KIMA's morning, 10 p.m. (on CW), 11 p.m. and weekend newscasts are shared with KEPR. There are no noon newscasts unlike most CBS affiliates. Branded as TriYak News, they cover both the Yakima Valley and the Columbia Basin. Weather segments for KIMA's evening newscasts are pre-taped at KEPR.

=== Notable current on-air staff ===
- John Kennedy O'Connor – anchor

== Technical information ==
=== Subchannels ===
The station's signal is multiplexed:

Subchannels of KIMA-TV
Subchannel	Res.	Short name	Programming
29.1	1080i	CBS29	CBS
29.2	720p	CW	The CW Plus
29.3	720p	TBD	Fox / Rip City Television Network

On September 23, 2024, the Portland Trail Blazers announced an agreement with Sinclair to launch Rip City Television Network, which syndicates games over-the-air. Games in Yakima air on KIMA's third subchannel.

On April 1, 2026, KCYU-LD (channel 41)'s intellectual unit (Fox affiliation, branding, and syndicated programming) moved to the third subchannel of KIMA-TV. As a result, Roar moved to KCYU's main subchannel.

=== Translator ===
- K23NE-D Ellensburg

== See also ==
- Channel 9 branded TV stations in the United States
- Channel 29 virtual TV stations in the United States
- Channel 33 digital TV stations in the United States
