= Retlaw Enterprises =

Privately held company (1950–2005)

Retlaw Enterprises, Inc.
- Type: Private
- Industry: Media, Real Estate
- Founded: 1950; 76 years ago
- Founder: Walt Disney
- Defunct: 2005; 21 years ago
- Fate: Folded into Walt Disney Family Foundation; Television stations sold to Fisher Communications
- Successor: Fisher Communications
- Headquarters: North Hollywood, Los Angeles, CA, United States
- Services: Broadcast
- Total assets: ~$150 million (1990)
- Owner: Lillian Disney (30%); Diane Disney Miller (40%); Sharon Disney Lund (30%)
- Subsidiaries: Retlaw Broadcasting Corp.

Retlaw Enterprises, originally Walt Disney Miniature Railroad, then Walt Disney, Inc. (WDI), and then WED Enterprises (WED), was a privately held company owned by the heirs of entertainment mogul Walt Disney. Disney formed the company to control the rights to his name and to manage two Disneyland attractions that he personally owned. The name, Retlaw, is Walter spelled backwards.

== History ==
Walt Disney Miniature Railroad was formed by Walt Disney in 1950 to manage the Carolwood Pacific Railroad, his elaborate backyard miniature railroad. The company's name was changed to Walt Disney, Inc. (WDI) on December 16, 1952, and its purpose was changed to supposedly produce TV shows. However, he soon started the Disneyland designing and engineering division within WDI. He also assigned the rights to his name and likeness to the company, as well as ownership of the Disneyland Railroad, Mark Twain Steamboat, Viewliner Train of Tomorrow (defunct), and Disneyland Monorail attractions in Disneyland. Roy O. Disney objected to Walt's creation of the company as he considered it a diversion of a larger portion of the Walt Disney Productions income to Walt's family. WDI charged a licensing fee to the Disney company for 5% to 10% of the income from all of Disney's merchandising deals. In light of objections from Roy as well as those of potential stockholders, WDI was renamed WED Enterprises (WED) in 1953 based on Walt's initials of Walter Elias Disney.

Walt also licensed Zorro TV rights from Mitchell Gertz in February 1953. WED Enterprises developed some scripts for the proposed Zorro TV series and shopped the series to the CBS and NBC TV networks. Both networks requested to see a pilot show. However, with the construction of Disneyland ongoing, the Zorro show was put on hold, and the rights were sold later that year to Walt Disney Productions.

In July 1953, Clement Melancon, a small shareholder of Walt Disney Productions stock, took Walt Disney and WED Enterprises, to court over the WED deal, believing that Walt had improperly funneled profits from Walt Disney Productions. The case was settled in January 1955.

In 1961, the park design group, the future Walt Disney Imagineering, opened a creative workshop in the Grand Central Business Park.

=== Retlaw ===
The theme park design and architectural group became so integral to Walt Disney Productions' operations that the studio bought it on February 5, 1965, along with the WED Enterprises name. Thus the Corporation needed a new name, Retlaw Enterprises.

In 1968, Retlaw started to diversify by acquiring its first TV station with its Fresno station purchase.

Finally, in 1982, the Disney family sold the naming rights and rail-based attractions to Walt Disney Productions for 818,461 shares of Disney stock then worth $42.6 million, none of which went to Retlaw. Retlaw's remaining divisions, after the majority of the company was sold to Walt's larger public company, were several television stations and real estate holdings that continue to be owned by the Disney family. Per Securities and Exchange Commission filings, Retlaw received $75 million in net income from the monorail and railroad from 1955 to late 1981. Roy E. Disney objected to the overvalued purchase price of the naming rights and voted against the purchase as a Disney board director.

By 1990, Retlaw holdings included 6 CBS affiliated TV stations, a small jet charter service operating out of Van Nuys Airport, 580 acres of farmland in Palmdale, 220 acres of vacant land in Riverside County, and 330 acres of avocado groves in Riverside County and Escondido. The family shares received in 1982 would be in 1990 2% of the Disney stock, worth an estimated $300 million; while Forbes estimates their stock to be worth $600 million, down from 1989's $850 million.

WFXG was purchased in May 1998. In 1999 Retlaw sold its remaining 11 television stations to Fisher Communications, including all of the related assets to those properties, for $215 million in cash.

In 2005, the remaining divisions of Retlaw officially became part of the Walt Disney Family Foundation, a non-profit organization led by Diane Disney Miller.

== Assets ==
- Walt Disney naming rights, until sold in 1982 to Walt Disney Productions (which was renamed The Walt Disney Company in 1986)
- Disneyland Attractions: Retlaw paid rent for the attractions' rights-of-way and employed the attraction administrators. Walt Disney, through Retlaw Enterprises, also owned the Viewliner Train of Tomorrow as well as the horse-drawn streetcars on Main Street. Sold to Disney Productions in 1982.
- Walt Disney Productions films: Retlaw purchased 10% interest in 26 Disney 1960's live-action movies, including Mary Poppins, through Walt Disney's management contract with Walt Disney Productions, allowing them to invest up to 15% in new projects. By 1990, these films generated an annual income of $600,000+ for Retlaw.
- The design and architectural division, which designed Disneyland and its attractions, and the WED name, were sold to Walt Disney Productions in 1965 and later rebranded WED Imagineering.
- Retlaw Broadcasting Corp., a subsidiary that held its TV stations

== Retlaw Broadcasting Corp. ==
Retlaw Broadcasting acquired KIMA-TV and its two semi-satellite stations, KLEW-TV and KEPR-TV, for $17 million in October 1986. The six stations owned in 1990 had been purchased, over the years, for $37 million, and were estimated then to be worth $100 million.

In 1996, Retlaw Broadcasting acquired KVAL-TV, KVAL semi-satellite stations KCBY and KPIC, as well as station KBOI-TV, all from Northwest Television of Eugene, Oregon.

Retlaw Broadcasting purchased WFXG in May 1998, its last acquisition before agreeing, in November 1998, to sell all 11 of its stations to Fisher Companies (later known as Fisher Communications) for $215 million. The deal was approved by the FCC in April 1999, and completed in July 1999.

Stations owned by Retlaw Broadcasting
Media market	State	Station	Purchased	Sold	Notes
Fresno–Visalia	California	KJEO	1968	1999	
Monterey–Salinas	California	KMST	1979	1993	
Augusta	Georgia	WFXG	1998	1999	
Columbus	Georgia	WXTX	1998	1999	
Boise	Idaho	KBCI-TV	1996	1999	
Idaho Falls–Pocatello	Idaho	KIDK	1988	1999	
Lewiston–Moscow	Idaho	KLEW-TV	1986	1999	(Note: KIMA semi-satellite.)
Coos Bay	Oregon	KCBY	1996	1999	(Note: KVAL semi-satellite.)
Eugene	Oregon	KVAL-TV	1996	1999	
Roseburg	Oregon	KPIC	1996	1999	
Pasco–Richland–Kennewick	Washington	WFXG	1986	1999	
Yakima	Washington	KIMA-TV	1986	1999	

== Bibliography ==
- Amendola, Dana (2015). All Aboard: The Wonderful World of Disney Trains (1st ed.). Disney Editions. ISBN 978-1-4231-1714-8.
- Broggie, Michael (2014) [1997]. Walt Disney's Railroad Story: The Small-Scale Fascination That Led to a Full-Scale Kingdom (4th ed.). The Donning Company Publishers. ISBN 978-1-57864-914-3.
- Curtis, Sandra (1998). Zorro Unmasked: The Official History. Hyperion. ISBN 0786882859.
- Eliot, Marc (1993). Walt Disney: Hollywood's dark prince: a biography. Carol Publishing Group. ISBN 155972174X.
