= Ahtanum Ridge =

Mountain ridge in Washington, United States

Coordinates: 46°30′25″N 120°48′56″W

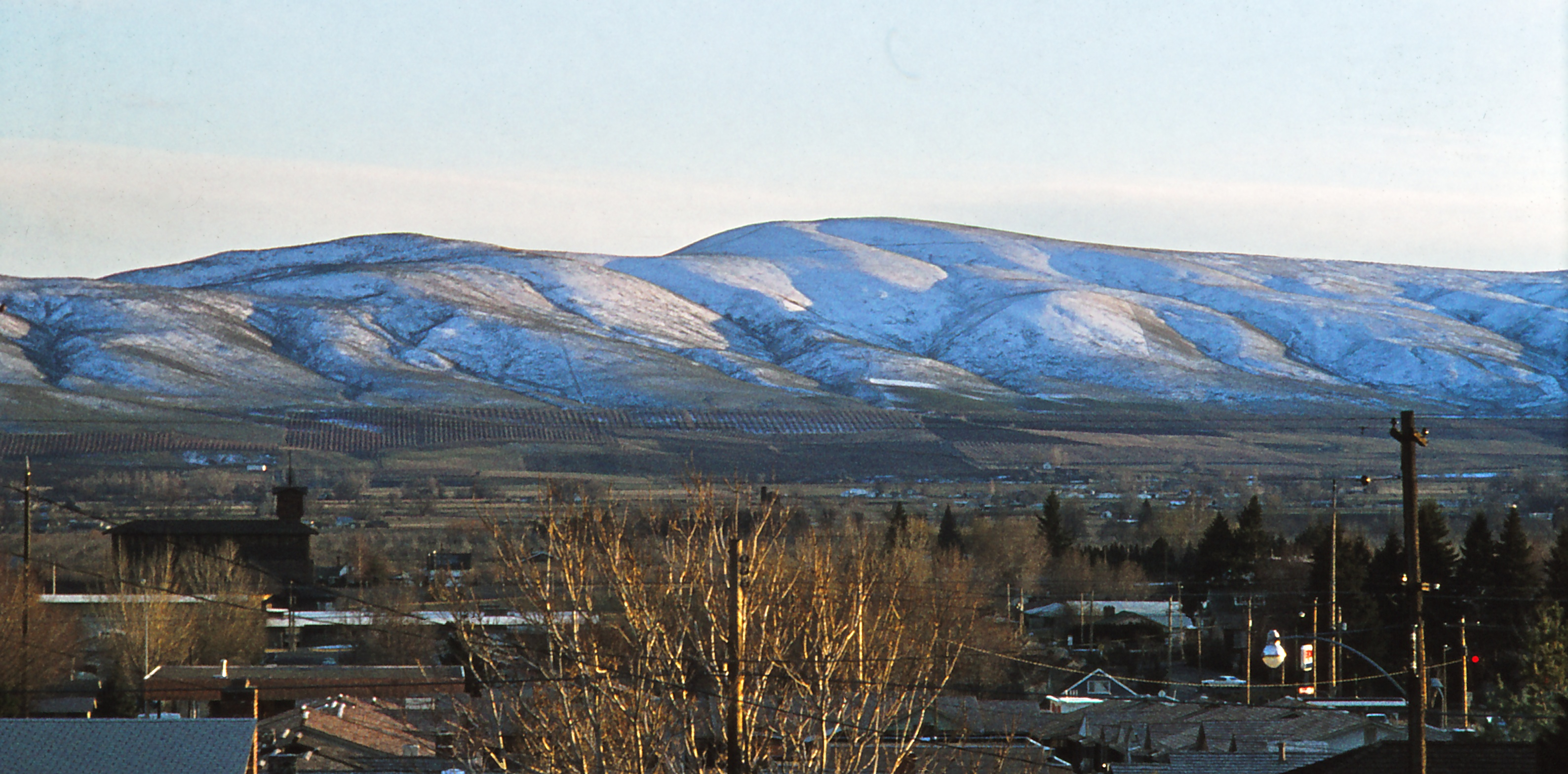
Ahtanum Ridge

Ahtanum Ridge is a long anticline mountain ridge in Yakima County in the U.S. state of Washington. It is located just south of the city of Yakima, and much of its length is at the northern edge of the Yakama Indian Reservation. Its name comes from the Sahaptin toponym [átanɨm].

Ahtanum Ridge is part of the Yakima Fold Belt of east-tending long ridges formed by the folding of Miocene Columbia River basalt flows.

Ahtanum Ridge separates Yakima Valley on the south from Ahtanum Valley on the north. At the eastern end of Ahtanum Ridge the Yakima River flows through Union Gap. The ridge continues east of Union Gap as the Rattlesnake Hills.
