= KEPR-TV =

Television station in Pasco, Washington

Semi-satellite of KIMA-TV, Yakima, Washington
- Pasco–Richland–Kennewick, Washington; United States
- City: Pasco, Washington
- Channels: Digital: 18 (UHF); Virtual: 19
- Branding: KEPR (pronounced "keeper"); TriYak News; CW 9 Yakima/Tri-Cities (19.2); Fox Tri-Cities 19.3 (19.3)

Programming
- Affiliations: 19.1: CBS; 19.2: CW+; 19.3: Fox

Ownership
- Owner: Sinclair Broadcast Group; (Sinclair Yakima Licensee, LLC)
- Operator: Standard Media
- Sister stations: KIMA-TV; KLEW-TV; KFFX-TV; KCYU-LD; KVVK-CD/KORX-CD

History
- First air date: December 30, 1954
- Former channel numbers: Analog: 19 (UHF, 1954–2009)
- Former affiliations: Both secondary: NBC (1954–1965); ABC (1954–1961, 1965–1970)
- Call sign meaning: Kennewick, Pasco, Richland

Technical information
- Licensing authority: FCC
- Facility ID: 56029
- ERP: 83 kW
- HAAT: 367 m (1,204 ft)
- Transmitter coordinates: 46°5′50″N 119°11′33″W

Links
- Public license information: Public file; LMS
- Website: www.triyaknews.com

KEPR-TV (channel 19) is a television station licensed to Pasco, Washington, United States, serving the Tri-Cities area as an affiliate of CBS, The CW Plus, and Fox. It is owned by Sinclair Broadcast Group alongside Univision affiliate KVVK-CD (channel 15); both stations are operated by Standard Media as sisters to KFFX-TV (channel 11). KEPR-TV and KVVK-CD share studios on West Lewis Street (US 395) in Pasco; KEPR-TV's transmitter is on Johnson Butte near Kennewick.

Although identifying as a station in its own right, KEPR is considered a semi-satellite of KIMA-TV (channel 29) in Yakima, which operates another semi-satellite, KLEW-TV (channel 3) in Lewiston, Idaho. KEPR and KLEW simulcast all network and syndicated programming as provided through KIMA, but air separate commercial inserts, legal identifications and early evening newscasts, and have their own websites. Master control and some internal operations for the four stations are based at KOMO Plaza (formerly Fisher Plaza) in Seattle.

On satellite, Dish Network and DirecTV carry both KEPR-TV and KIMA-TV.

== History ==
KEPR-TV went on the air for the first time December 30, 1954, as a satellite of KIMA-TV. It was owned by Cascade Broadcasting Company, which also owned 40 percent of KWIE (610 AM) in Kennewick. Cascade bought the remaining 60 percent of KWIE in November 1956 and changed its call letters to KEPR, matching the television station, the following year.

A few years earlier, the Federal Communications Commission (FCC) collapsed all of central Washington into one giant television market. However, this market was designated a "UHF island" due to being sandwiched between Seattle to the west, Spokane to the east and Portland to the south. It soon became apparent that one full-power UHF station would not nearly be enough for adequate coverage of this vast and mountainous area. KEPR-TV thus signed on as the first station in the United States to be a satellite of another.

Original plans called for it to be a straight repeater of KIMA-TV, apart from station identifications. However, it soon became apparent that Tri-Cities residents wanted a more local station. Monte Strohl, who until then had been a radio salesman at KIMA, was installed as the first manager-salesman of KEPR-TV. The station also added a separate news department.

Like its parent station, KEPR-TV carried programming from all three networks, but was a primary CBS affiliate. It lost ABC in 1961 when KNDU (channel 25) signed on following the lead of parent station KNDO (channel 23), lost NBC but regained ABC in 1965 when KNDU and KNDO became full-time NBC affiliates, and lost ABC again when KVEW (channel 42) signed on along with parent KAPP (channel 35) in 1970. During the 1970s, KEPR and KIMA co-branded as "Cascade TV".

Filmways agreed to purchase Cascade Broadcasting for $3 million in 1968; the sale was approved the following year. Cascade's previous owners retained the company's radio stations, which by this point also included KEPR-FM (105.3 FM), under the name Yakima Valley Communications; the KEPR radio stations then changed their call letters to KONA and KONA-FM. Filmways sold KEPR-TV, KIMA-TV, and KLEW-TV to NWG Broadcasting for $1 million in 1972. Retlaw Enterprises acquired the NWG stations for $17 million in 1986; the stations were operated as part of the Retlaw Broadcasting division. Fisher Communications purchased KEPR-TV along with the other Retlaw owned stations in 1999.

KEPR logo prior to 2007

In 2000, KEPR became the first station in the Tri-Cities to broadcast a digital signal with the activation of a low-power, standard-definition signal on channel 18; this was upgraded to a full-power, high-definition signal in 2007. The digital signal remained on channel 18 following the end of analog broadcasting in 2009, using virtual channel 19.

On March 30, 2009, KEPR launched a digital subchannel affiliated with The CW, filling the void left by KCWK (channel 9) going dark at the end of May 2008 due to the Pappas Telecasting bankruptcy. The subchannel subsequently took KCWK's former channel 9 position on local cable systems. As had been the case with KCWK, programming is primarily sourced from the network's CW+ feed, along with a local 10 p.m. newscast.

On April 11, 2013, Fisher announced that it would sell its properties, including KEPR-TV, to the Sinclair Broadcast Group. The deal was completed on August 8, 2013.

On February 1, 2026, Sinclair and Rincon Broadcasting Group, owner of then-Fox affiliates KFFX-TV and KCYU-LD, entered into joint sales, management and shared services agreements allowing Rincon to provide sales, programming, and other services to KEPR and KIMA. In March 2026, Rincon president Todd Parkin filed to transfer Rincon Broadcasting to Community News Media, an affiliate of Standard General.

== News operation ==
KEPR's morning, 10 p.m. (on CW), 11 p.m. and weekend newscasts are shared with KIMA-TV. Branded as TriYak News, they cover both the Columbia Basin and the Yakima Valley. KEPR continues to produce its own 5 and 6 p.m. weekday newscasts. There are no noon newscasts unlike most CBS affiliates.

== Subchannels ==
The station's signal is multiplexed:

Subchannels of KEPR-TV
Subchannel#United	Res.	Short name	Programming
19.1	1080i	KEPR	CBS
19.2	720p	KEPR	The CW Plus
19.3	720p	TBD	Fox / Rip City Television Network

On September 23, 2024, the Portland Trail Blazers announced an agreement with Sinclair to launch Rip City Television Network, which syndicates games over-the-air. Games in Pasco air on KEPR's third subchannel.

On April 1, 2026, KFFX-TV (channel 11)'s intellectual unit (Fox affiliation, branding, and syndicated programming) moved to the third subchannel of KEPR. As a result, Roar moved to KFFX's main subchannel.

== See also ==
- Channel 9 branded TV stations in the United States
- Channel 18 digital TV stations in the United States
- Channel 19 virtual TV stations in the United States
