= Roar (TV network) =

American digital broadcast television network

- Type: Digital multicast television network
- Country: United States
- Broadcast area: Nationwide, via digital terrestrial television (covering 78.82% of all U.S. television households), Stirr, and Stremium
- Affiliates: List of Roar affiliates
- Headquarters: Hunt Valley, Maryland

Programming
- Language: English
- Picture format: 1080p (HDTV master feed); (otherwise 480i SDTV widescreen on most subchannel affiliates)

Ownership
- Owner: Sinclair Broadcast Group
- Parent: Sinclair Television Group
- Key people: David Amy (vice chairman, Sinclair Broadcast Group); Christopher Ripley; (president/CEO, Sinclair Broadcast Group)
- Sister channels: Charge!; Comet; Tennis Channel; The Nest

History
- Founded: December 7, 2016; 9 years ago
- Launched: February 13, 2017; 9 years ago
- Former names: TBD (2017–2025)

Links
- Webcast: Watch live
- Website: www.watchroar.com

Roar (formerly TBD.) is an American digital multicast television network owned by the Sinclair Television Group subsidiary of Sinclair Broadcast Group. From its launch in 2017, the channel focused on millennials with short-form viral video content and reality programming, but eventually shifted towards traditional hour/half hour long sketch comedy and other comedic-focused programming underserved in the digital subchannel space. With the acquisition of repeats of Saturday Night Live in the fall of 2024, the network rebranded to Roar on April 28, 2025, to complete its transition towards comedic content.

== Background ==
The development of TBD is traced to a visit by Sinclair Broadcast Group management to the Santa Monica, California, headquarters of the Tennis Channel in January 2016, as it began to close on acquiring the network. While touring Tennis Channel's main control room, company executives spotted a monitor carrying the foreign feed of The QYOU, a Dublin-based digital media company and online video service headed by co-founders Curt Marvis and Scott Ehrlich, which curates various online video content aggregated from various producers for European audiences. Seeing the QYOU feed sparked a conversation among the executives about developing a similar service for television viewers in the United States, which Sinclair proceeded to bring to concept.

== History ==
The company formally announced the planned launch of TBD on December 7, 2016. The network was the third of four digital broadcast networks that Sinclair developed and launched during the 2010s: it previously launched the sports-focused American Sports Network in August 2014 (which rebranded to Stadium in 2017, then The Nest in 2024), and science fiction-focused network Comet in October 2015, and around the time of the TBD announcement, it also disclosed plans to launch action-adventure network Charge!, a joint venture with Comet partner MGM Television that launched on February 28, 2017. To assemble programming and help provide creative support for TBD, Sinclair retained the services of The QYOU, marking the first venture into advertiser-supported broadcast television for the company, which already operates a pay television service in Europe; The QYOU had expressed interest on developing a similar subscription television service in the U.S. or ad-supported networks modeled after TBD in other countries.

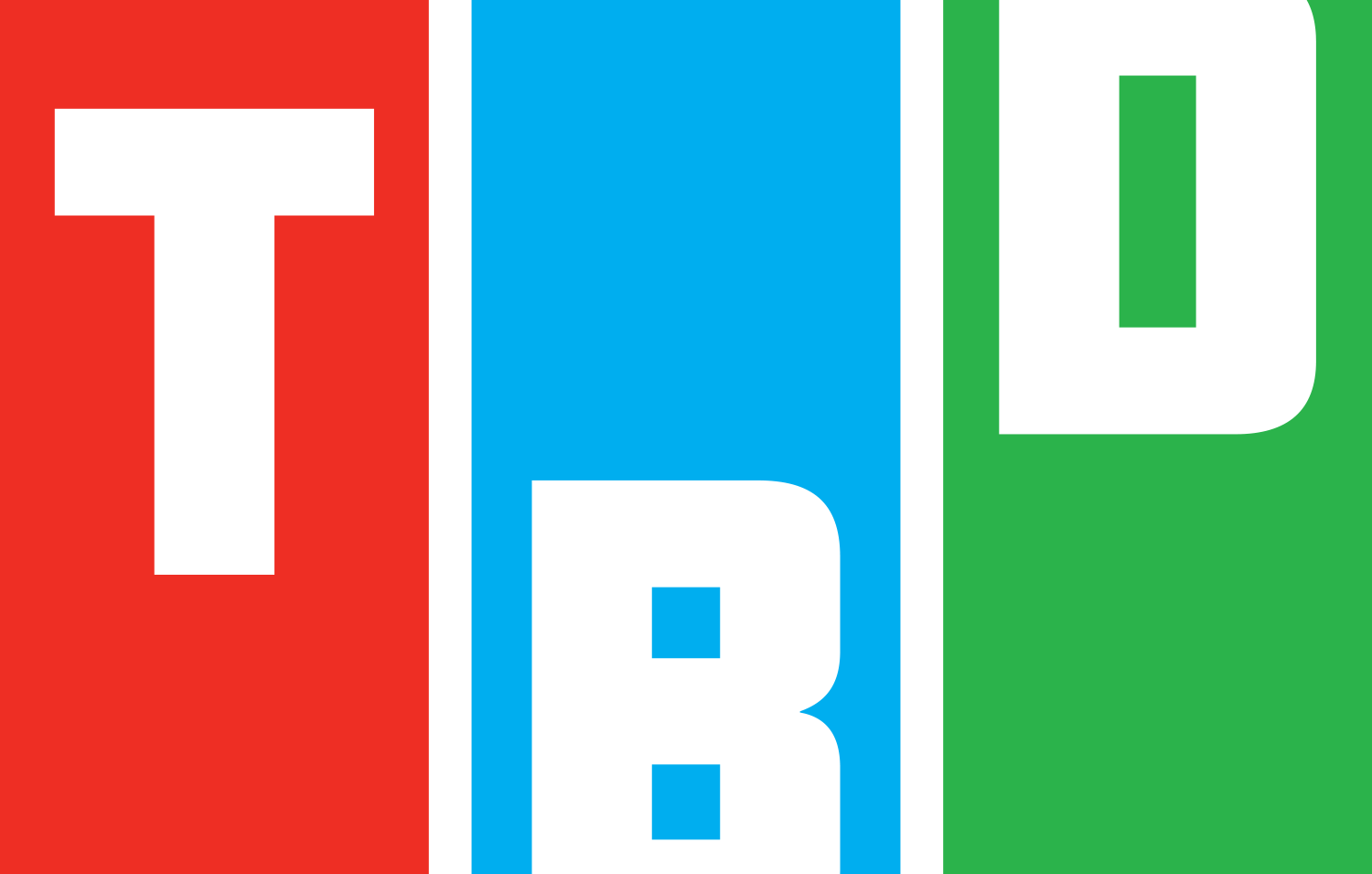
Original TBD logo, used from February 13, 2017, to August 25, 2019.

In its press release announcing TBD's launch, Sinclair expressed that the network would be "reinvigorating traditional television for today's millennial audience", a demographic cohort that tends to enjoy video content via online sources other than traditional broadcast or cable television, although some within the demographic do supplement online content with over-the-air television. The network's more contemporary programming (digital-first series and videos) and younger-skewing target audience made TBD unique in comparison to many other digital multicast networks that feature classic television programs and movies aimed toward older audiences or niche audiences based on gender, ethnicity or genre interest. As part of that reach to millennials, TBD took a "screen agnostic" approach to delivery, appearing not only on broadcast television, but through an online platform and eventually through apps for smartphones, tablets and smart TV devices (the network's website provides a live stream of its programming, exempting advertising and interstitial segments aired during breaks within and between programs).

The "TBD" name came in a sort of roundabout way for Sinclair: early in the network's conception, Scott Shapiro, Sinclair's vice president of corporate development, referred to it by the abbreviation for "to be determined". Realizing that Sinclair's 2014 acquisition of Allbritton Communications included ownership of the TBD.com domain name (which was used for Allbritton's former Washington, D.C.-area news site and also briefly for its associated regional cable news channel NewsChannel 8), the network described the TBD name and TBD.com domain as, according to Sinclair's press release announcing its launch, "TBD's entertainment promise is always 'To Be Determined'." TBD began broadcasting as a soft launch on February 13, 2017, on the subchannels of two Sinclair stations: Fox affiliate WLUK-TV in Green Bay, Wisconsin and CBS affiliate WTVH in Syracuse, New York (the latter of which is operated by Sinclair through a local marketing agreement with WTVH owner Granite Broadcasting).

On October 16, 2018, Sinclair signed an agreement with Jukin Media to assume operational responsibilities for TBD, effective immediately. The agreement also resulted in content supplied by Jukin being expanded on TBD's programming lineup. Jukin Media would later be acquired by Trusted Media Brands in 2021, a parent company of Reader's Digest.

Final TBD logo, used from August 25, 2019, to April 28, 2025.

By the start of 2024, the channel gradually shifted its programming towards comedy-based reality programming, acquiring programs such as Whose Line Is It Anyway?, Punk'd, and Key & Peele, augmenting a schedule which already had some comedic programming carried before the shift such as World's Dumbest... and FailFactory from Jukin's FailArmy. In the fall of 2024, TBD added repeats of Saturday Night Live to their schedule (carrying hour-long versions which were originally designed for the cable market), becoming the first broadcast subchannel network to carry the series as a regular offering, with the remainder of Jukin's content eventually being reduced to commercial breaks.

On March 3, 2025, Sinclair announced the network would rebrand from TBD to Roar (as in the term "roaring laughter") effective April 28, embracing its direction to comedic-focused shows.

== Programming ==
From the network's launch in 2017 (under the name of TBD) until 2024, the network's schedule featured various web-originated films, scripted and unscripted series, showcase programming, and featurettes (featuring a wide range of topical and themed categories including but not limited to science, fashion, lifestyle, travel, music, comedy, gaming, esports, and viral content) through deals with various online content producers and distributors which license their content for broadcast on TBD including: Canvas Media Studios, Jukin Media, Filmhub (formerly Kinonation), Legendary Entertainment (including content from subsidiaries Nerdist Industries and Geek and Sundry), Whistle Sports Network (which also provides short segments aired during certain commercial breaks) and Zoomin.TV.

From the network's launch, through its partnership with The QYOU, TBD carried daily "preview" blocks of the service's daypart-based video compilation programs, which regularly aired four times per day each weekday, including during the overnight and morning seven days a week and during the afternoon and early evening on weekdays (and initially, Saturdays until September 2017). TBD did not carry sample blocks of The QYOU's weekend programming, opting instead to air rebroadcasts selected from the weekday QYOU blocks that the network aired over the prior week in the morning and late night on Saturdays and Sundays. In September 2017, TBD began removing the daily QYOU blocks carried within its schedule, giving certain weekday prime time and weekend mid-afternoon time slots to the network's other entertainment programs. As a result of an agreement reached between QYOU Media and Sinclair Digital Group to terminate their content agreement for TBD, the network removed all QYOU programming on September 17, 2018. (The time periods occupied by the QYOU sampler blocks were replaced with additional airings of existing short-form-content-focused compilation programs in TBD's inventory, with feature films replacing QYOU Prime's former weekday early evening slot.)

Sinclair also negotiated agreements with other web content producers, distributors and application developers to provide programming for the network. Another possible content avenue for TBD may come via resources from the news-producing stations among Sinclair's stable of its owned-or-operated television stations and their websites, which would bring the various local lifestyle and various features that they produce to a national audience through TBD, as well as through its digital news service Circa News.

The network currently holds exclusive responsibility for advertising sales, pervading three to six minutes per hour of advertising inventory within its program breaks; advertising on Roar at present consists mainly of public service announcements and some direct response advertising (the remaining time is usually filled by Whistle Sports-produced interstitials), though the network encourages prospective national sponsors to develop experimental advertisements tailored to appeal toward the network's key demographic. Sinclair plans to review allowing Roar's affiliates to be able to lease time for inserting station promotions and commercials for local businesses in the future.

On May 7, 2018, TBD began carrying KidsClick, a multiplatform children's programming endeavor launched the previous year featuring long-form and short-form animated content from various production studios. The move resulted in TBD transitioning into being the block's national subchannel carrier, which had been asserted by Tribune Media-owned This TV since the three-hour morning cartoon block debuted in July 2017. (TBD became the exclusive network carrier of KidsClick on July 1, 2018, as a result of This TV discontinuing carriage of the block, one month before the cancelation of the proposed merger between Tribune and Sinclair.) The block was discontinued less than ten months later on March 31, 2019.

== Affiliates ==
As of April 28, 2025, Roar currently has 126 television stations across the country. The network has a combined national reach of 78.82% of all households in the United States (or 103,824,515 Americans with at least one television set).

Along with WLUK and WTVH, Sinclair's soft launch of TBD during the week of February 13, 2017, saw the network added to digital subchannels of three other stations owned by Sinclair directly: KDSM-TV/Des Moines, KABB/San Antonio and KUNP/La Grande-Portland, Oregon. The network was added to digital subchannels in three phases to work out any technical and transmission issues; 52 stations owned or operated by Sinclair became TBD charter affiliates at the conclusion of the first phase of affiliate launch in early March 2017 (most of which joined the network on February 28). Other stations among those which Sinclair owns or operates (including stations it operates through sharing agreements with third-party licensees, and partner groups Deerfield Media, Howard Stirk Holdings, and Cunningham Broadcasting) began carrying TBD during 2017, either on newly created subchannels or existing ones that were affiliated with Grit, GetTV or other competing multicast networks through affiliation agreements with Sinclair that were pending expiration.

Sinclair's launch of TBD (as well as Comet and Charge! before and after it) was part of the company's aim toward "expanding our business with new digital multicast networks that leverage our broadcast spectrum and household reach", as expressed by the company's President and CEO, Christopher Ripley, in the press release announcing TBD's launch. The soft launch on Sinclair stations during the first half of 2017 was also intended to work out any technical and transmission issues. Once those issues were worked out and TBD began expanding, Sinclair began offering the network to individual stations and station groups in markets where Sinclair does not have a broadcast presence.

Some of Sinclair's stations (as well as others not owned by Sinclair or its partner groups that are affiliated with the syndication service) elected to use the TBD subchannel as an alternate outlet for the American Sports Network, pre-empting certain afternoon or evening programs within the national TBD schedule to carry sports events not carried by the main channel of its CW and MyNetworkTV affiliates or independent stations. Among its affiliates, WRLH-TV in Richmond, Virginia (which carries the network on its DT2 subchannel) does not carry the network's full programming schedule, airing the MyNetworkTV prime time lineup in place of its programs that air from 8:00 to 10:00 p.m. Eastern Time weeknights (such an arrangement, which dates to the subchannel's prior affiliation with This TV, was necessary because the Richmond market does not have enough available commercial stations for MyNetworkTV to maintain a standalone main channel affiliation).

Since January 2021, the network began airing as the primary affiliation on certain stations (all controlled by Sinclair), replacing traditional major network affiliations (which moved to its sister stations), the first stations to switch to the network on primary affiliates were WXBU in Lancaster, Pennsylvania (serving Harrisburg), KENV-DT in Elko, Nevada (a submarket of the Salt Lake City market), and WTTE in Columbus, Ohio. WXBU (then as WLYH-TV) was affiliated with CBS (sharing that with WHP-TV until 1995; Sinclair later acquired WHP-TV outright), then UPN and The CW (the latter now airing on WHP-TV 21.3), while KENV-DT shared the NBC affiliation with primary NBC affiliate KSL-TV and WTTE was affiliated with Fox before its intellectual property was moved to ABC affiliate WSYX (which Sinclair also owns outright) on channel 6.3.

In December 2024, Sinclair made a distribution agreement with Fox Television Stations to add the network to four of its Fox owned and operated stations effective on January 15, 2025 (replacing the OTA feed of TheGrio).
