= Cookie Jar Kids Network =

Former American children's programming block

- Launched: September 1, 2003 (as DIC Kids Network); August 31, 2009 (as Cookie Jar Kids Network)
- Closed: August 29, 2009 (as DIC Kids Network); September 17, 2011 (as Cookie Jar Kids Network)
- Country of origin: United States
- Formerly known as: DIC Kids Network (2003–2009); The Incredible World of DiC (2003–2009), on-air name)

The Cookie Jar Kids Network (formerly DIC Kids Network) was a syndicated children's programming block that airs selected Cookie Jar Group shows on local Fox, The CW, MyNetworkTV, and independent stations to provide them with a source of E/I programming required by federal law. The block is known on-air as simply Cookie Jar. It was first formed in 2003 as the DIC Kids Network, and was syndicated by Tribune Entertainment from 2003 to 2007, and then by Ascent Media from 2007 to 2011.

National ad sales for the syndicated blocks were handled by Tribune Entertainment with a barter basis available. Ads could have stitched together other programs throughout the three blocks.

== History ==
In February 2003, DIC announced three syndicated children's programming E/I blocks called DIC Kids Network with 200 stations including those owned by Tribune, Sinclair, Clear Channel and Cox signed up to carry the blocks. Margaret Loesch and Donald Roberts, a specialist in kids and media at Stanford University, help develop the blocks. By July, 400 stations had signed 3 to 5 year deals to air the block, and it was also announced that the block would launch on September 1. With its three feeds, DIC Kids was on Fox, The WB and UPN affiliates and out fulfilled the networks' Saturday morning blocks by December 1.

On March 31, 2004, DIC announced that they had acquired US broadcast rights to Ace Lightning from Alliance Atlantis, and would premiere the series on April 5th. On the same day, Liberty's Kids was announced to be added to the block, alongside the return of Sabrina: The Animated Series. A holiday lineup consisting of specials and movies like A Christmas Carol and Inspector Gadget Saves Christmas was also planned. DIC also planned to offer up acquired programmes for the block as well.

In May 2004, DIC acquired the syndicated television rights to 26 select episodes of The Smurfs and the first three seasons of The Adventures of Captain Planet from Warner Bros. Domestic Television Distribution for a March 2005 broadcast window.

In May 2005, DIC announced that Strawberry Shortcake would be added to the strand beginning in January 2006 in order to broaden the screen reach for the series. In October, it was confirmed that Strawberry would replace Captain Planet on the schedule.

In mid-2008, the group announced that they would renew the focus of the block with an emphasis on offering DIC Entertainment programming to additional digital subchannels to meet their E/I needs. On June 20, 2008, it has been announced that DIC Entertainment would be acquired by Canada-based Cookie Jar. On July 23, 2008, the deal was completed, and the block was later relaunched as the Cookie Jar Kids Network on August 31, 2009. The block quietly ended on September 17, 2011.

== Programming ==
Notes:

–Shows marked with a * do not fulfill E/I requirements.
–The programming premiere and end dates are based on weekday broadcasts.

=== Former programming ===
==== The Incredible World of DiC ====
Title	Premiere date	End date	Original network	Source(s)
Sherlock Holmes in the 22nd Century †	September 1, 2003	September 28, 2006	Fox Kids (Fox); Syndication	
Sherlock Holmes in the 22nd Century †	April 9, 2008	August 30, 2008	Fox Kids (Fox); Syndication	
Stargate Infinity	September 1, 2003	July 3, 2004	FoxBox (Fox)	
All Dogs Go to Heaven: The Series	September 1, 2003	August 27, 2004	Syndication; Fox Family	
Sabrina: The Animated Series	September 1, 2003	November 4, 2003	Disney's One Saturday Morning (ABC); Disney's One Too (UPN)	
Sabrina: The Animated Series	August 30, 2004	April 5, 2006	Disney's One Saturday Morning (ABC); Disney's One Too (UPN)	
Archie's Weird Mysteries	September 3, 2003	July 1, 2004	PAX Kids (PAX)	
Archie's Weird Mysteries	October 7, 2005	September 1, 2007	PAX Kids (PAX)	
Archie's Weird Mysteries	April 6, 2009	August 27, 2009	PAX Kids (PAX)	
The Littles	September 5, 2003	April 4, 2009	ABC	
The Berenstain Bears	September 6, 2003	December 28, 2008	CBS	
Sabrina's Secret Life	November 10, 2003	August 25, 2004	Originally aired	
Sabrina's Secret Life	April 10, 2006	August 30, 2006	Originally aired	
Sabrina's Secret Life	October 2, 2006	August 28, 2007	Originally aired	
Sabrina's Secret Life	September 5, 2007	April 5, 2008	Originally aired	
Sabrina's Secret Life	September 4, 2008	April 4, 2009	Originally aired	
Ace Lightning	April 5, 2004	December 31, 2004	Originally aired	
Liberty's Kids †	July 8, 2004	August 27, 2009	PBS Kids (PBS)	
Inspector Gadget's Field Trip	September 3, 2004	August 30, 2007	The History Channel	
Super Duper Sumos*	September 4, 2004		Nickelodeon	
Mummies Alive!*	September 4, 2004		Syndication	
Sonic Underground*	September 4, 2004		BKN Kids II (Syndication)	
Captain Planet and the Planeteers	January 3, 2005	December 31, 2005	TBS; Syndication	
The Smurfs	January 3, 2005	December 31, 2005	NBC	
Trollz †	October 3, 2005	August 29, 2006	Originally aired	
Trollz †	September 1, 2008	August 29, 2009	Originally aired	
Strawberry Shortcake	January 2, 2006	July 30, 2007	Direct-to-video	
Horseland	September 3, 2007	April 3, 2009	KOL Secret Slumber Party (CBS)	
Madeline †	September 1, 2008	August 29, 2009	The Family Channel; ABC; Disney Channel	

† - Program transitioned to Cookie Jar

==== Cookie Jar ====
Title	Premiere date	End date	Original network	Source(s)
The Busy World of Richard Scarry	August 31, 2009	September 22, 2010	Showtime; Nickelodeon	
Wimzie's House	August 31, 2009	September 15, 2011	PBS Kids (PBS)	
DinoSquad	April 8, 2010	September 25, 2010	KEWLopolis (CBS)	
Trollz †	April 8, 2010	September 25, 2010	Originally aired	
Noonbory and the Super Seven	September 27, 2010	September 13, 2011	Cookie Jar TV (CBS)	
Will and Dewitt	September 27, 2010	September 13, 2011	Kids' WB! (The CW)	
Liberty's Kids †	September 29, 2010	September 15, 2011	PBS Kids (PBS)	
Madeline †	October 1, 2010	September 17, 2011	The Family Channel; ABC; Disney Channel	
Sherlock Holmes in the 22nd Century †	October 1, 2010	September 17, 2011	Fox Kids (Fox); Syndication	

† - Program transitioned from The Incredible World of DiC

== Affiliate list ==
The following is a list of stations that carried the DiC Kids Network/Cookie Jar Kids Network block in syndication as of September 17, 2011.

=== The Incredible World of DIC ===
- Light purple indicates stations ran DiC Kids Network programming A
- Pink indicates stations ran DiC Kids Network programming B
- Light yellow indicates stations ran DiC Kids Network programming C
- Light indigo indicates stations ran DiC Kids Network programming D

City of license/market	Station	Affiliation	Owner	Years ran	Notes
Boise, Idaho	KTRV	Fox	Block Communications	2003–2007	KTRV-TV pushed the weekday lineup to 10:00 a.m. in April 2007 after KTRV launched the new two hour weekday morning newscasts from 6:00 a.m. to 8 a.m..
Boise, Idaho	KNIN-TV	UPN; The CW	Banks Broadcasting	2003–2007	Originally ran on weekdays. Moved to Saturday mornings in late 2004 due to expanded religious programming. This, along with other syndicated E/I programming preempted the Kids' WB programming after the affiliate switch from UPN to The CW in 2006. Kids' WB programming were seen in the Boise market via The CW+ affiliate KNIN-DT2.
Boise, Idaho	KWOB (Cable Only)	The WB 100+	Tribune Broadcasting	2003–2005	
Boston, Massachusetts	WSBK	UPN	CBS Television Stations	2003–2005	
Boston, Massachusetts	WLVI	The CW	Tribune Broadcasting	2006–2007	
Charleston, West Virginia; Huntington, West Virginia	WVAH-TV	Fox	Cunningham Broadcasting	2003–2009	
Charlotte, North Carolina	WWWB; WMYT	The WB; MyNetworkTV	Capitol Broadcasting Company	2003–2007	
Charlotte, North Carolina	WJZY	UPN; The CW	Capitol Broadcasting Company	2003–2007	
Chicago, Illinois	WPWR	UPN	Fox Television Stations	2003–2005	
Chicago, Illinois	WGN-TV	The WB; The CW	Tribune Broadcasting	2005–2007	
Fort Wayne, Indiana	WFFT-TV	Fox	Allen Media Broadcasting	2004–2007	
Los Angeles, California	KTLA	The WB	Nexstar Media Group	2003–2008	
Louisville, Kentucky	WDRB-TV	Fox	Block Communications	2004–2007	
Minneapolis-St. Paul, Minnesota	WFTC	UPN; MyNetworkTV	Fox Television Stations	2003–2007 (WFTC); 2007–2008 (WUCW)	WFTC transitioned DIC Kids Network programming A to The CW-affiliate, WUCW starting in Fall 2007.
Minneapolis-St. Paul, Minnesota	KMSP-TV; WUCW	Fox	Fox Television Stations	2003–2006 (KMSP); 2006–2007 (WUCW)	KMSP transitioned DIC Kids Network programming B to WUCW after the station's affiliate switch from The WB to The CW in September 2006.
Minneapolis-St. Paul, Minnesota	KMWB	The WB	Sinclair Broadcast Group	2003–2006	
Nashville, Tennessee	WUXP-TV	UPN	Sinclair Broadcast Group	2003–2006	
New York City, New York	WNYW	Fox	Fox Television Stations	2003–2007	
Philadelphia, Pennsylvania	WPHL-TV	The WB	Nexstar Media Group	2003–2007	
Portland, Oregon	KPTV	Fox	Meredith Corporation	2006–2007	The Portland market didn't pickup this lineup of DIC programs until September 2006.
Portland, Oregon	KPTV; KRCW	Fox; The CW	Meredith Corporation	2003–2006 (KPTV); 2006–2007 (KRCW)	KPTV transitioned DIC Kids Network programming B to KWBP in September 2006.
Portland, Oregon	KWBP	The WB	Tribune Broadcasting	2003–2006	
Phoenix, Arizona	KAZT-TV	Independent	London Media Group	2003–2007	
Phoenix, Arizona	KASW; KTVK	The WB; The CW; Independent	Belo Corporation	2003–2007	
Phoenix, Arizona	KUTP; KSAZ-TV	Fox; UPN; MyNetworkTV	Fox Television Stations	2003–2007	
Spokane, Washington	KAYU-TV	Fox	Stainless Broadcasting Company	2003–2006	
Tucson, Arizona	KMSB; KTTU (TV)	Fox; UPN; MyNetworkTV	Belo Corporation	2003–2007	
Tucson, Arizona	KWBA-TV	The WB; The CW	Cascade Broadcasting Group	2003–2007	
Waco, Texas	KWKT-TV	Fox	Nexstar Media Group	2003–2006	

=== Cookie Jar ===
- Light purple indicates stations ran Cookie Jar Kids Network programming A
- Pink indicates stations ran Cookie Jar Kids Network programming B

City of license/market	Station	Affiliation	Owner	Years ran	Notes
Asheville, North Carolina	WLOS	ABC	Sinclair Broadcast Group	2009–2011	
Baltimore, Maryland	WBFF	Fox	Sinclair Broadcast Group	2009–2011	
Buffalo, New York	WNYO-TV	MyNetworkTV	Sinclair Broadcast Group	2009–2011	
Buffalo, New York	WUTV	Fox	Sinclair Broadcast Group	2009–2011	
Charleston, South Carolina	WCIV	MyNetworkTV	Sinclair Broadcast Group	2009–2011	
Charleston, South Carolina	WTAT-TV	Fox	Sinclair Broadcast Group	2009–2011	
Charleston, West Virginia; Huntington, West Virginia	WVAH-TV	Fox	Cunningham Broadcasting	2009–2011	
Cincinnati, Ohio	WSTR-TV	MyNetworkTV	Deerfield Media	2009–2011	
Columbus, Ohio	WTTE	Fox	Cunningham Broadcasting	2009–2011	
Des Moines, Iowa	KDSM-TV	Fox	Sinclair Broadcast Group	2009–2011	
Greensboro, North Carolina; Winston-Salem, North Carolina; High Point, North Carolina	WMYV	MyNetworkTV	Sinclair Broadcast Group	2009–2011	
Louisville, Kentucky	WDRB	Fox	Block Communications	2009–2011	
Milwaukee, Wisconsin	WVTV	The CW	Sinclair Broadcast Group	2009–2011	
Nashville, Tennessee	WUXP-TV	MyNetworkTV	Sinclair Broadcast Group	2009–2011	
Nashville, Tennessee	WZTV	Fox	Sinclair Broadcast Group	2009–2011	
Norfolk, Virginia; Hampton Roads, Virginia	WTVZ-TV	MyNetworkTV	Sinclair Broadcast Group	2009–2011	
Paducah, Kentucky; Cape Girardeau, Missouri; Harrisburg, Illinois	WDKA	MyNetworkTV	Standard Media	2009–2011	
Paducah, Kentucky; Cape Girardeau, Missouri; Harrisburg, Illinois	KBSI	Fox	Standard Media	2009–2011	
Pittsburgh, Pennsylvania	WPNT	MyNetworkTV	Sinclair Broadcast Group	2009–2011	
Pittsburgh, Pennsylvania	WPGH-TV	Fox	Sinclair Broadcast Group	2009–2011	
Raleigh, North Carolina; Durham, North Carolina; Fayetteville, North Carolina	WLFL-TV	The CW	Sinclair Broadcast Group	2009–2011	
Raleigh, North Carolina; Durham, North Carolina; Fayetteville, North Carolina	WRDC	MyNetworkTV	Sinclair Broadcast Group	2009–2011	
Richmond, Virginia; Petersburg, Virginia	WRLH-TV	Fox	Sinclair Broadcast Group	2009–2011	
Rochester, New York	WUHF	Fox	Sinclair Broadcast Group	2009–2011	
Syracuse, New York	WNYS	MyNetworkTV	Northwest Broadcasting	2009–2011	
Syracuse, New York	WSYT	Fox	Imagicomm Communications	2009–2011	
Tampa, Florida; St. Petersburg, Florida; Sarasota, Florida	WTTA	MyNetworkTV	Nexstar Media Group	2009–2011	

== See also ==
- Cookie Jar TV (Cookie Jar's former Saturday morning/daily children's block on CBS)
- Cookie Jar Toons (another former Saturday morning/daily children's block on This TV)
