= WNYS (disambiguation) =

WNYS may refer to:

- WNYS-CD, a low-power television station (channel 16, virtual 68) licensed to serve Ithaca, New York, United States
- WGGO, a radio station (1590 AM) licensed to Salamanca, New York, which held the call sign WNYS from 1957 to the 1960s
- WHTT-FM, a radio station (104.1 FM) licensed to Buffalo, New York, which held the call sign WNYS from 1982 to 1986
- WSYR-TV, a television station (channel 9) licensed to Syracuse, New York, which held the call sign WNYS from 1962 to 1978
- WNYS-TV, a defunct television station (channel 43) licensed to Syracuse, New York, which held the call sign from 1994 to 2020
