= ABC 6 =

ABC 6 or 6abc may refer to one of the following television stations in the United States:

== Current ==
=== Owned-and-operated station ===
- WPVI-TV in Philadelphia, Pennsylvania, which operates the 6abc.com website

=== Affiliated stations ===
- KAAL (TV) in Austin–Rochester, Minnesota
- KIVI-TV in Nampa–Boise, Idaho
- KSVI in Billings, Montana
- KWNB-TV in McCook, Nebraska
  - Satellite of KHGI-TV in Kearney, Nebraska
- WABG-TV in Greenwood–Greenville, Mississippi
- WATE-TV in Knoxville, Tennessee
- WDAY-TV in Fargo, North Dakota
- WJBF in Augusta, Georgia
- WRTV in Indianapolis, Indiana
- WSYX in Columbus, Ohio

== Formerly affiliated ==
- KCEN-TV in Temple–Waco–Killeen, Texas (1953–1985; secondary until 1984)
- KDRO-TV/KMOS-TV in Sedalia, Missouri (primarily from 1958–1961; secondary until 1971)
- KPVI-DT in Pocatello, Idaho (1974–1996)
- WBRC in Birmingham, Alabama (1949–1996; secondary until 1961)
- WITI (TV) in Milwaukee, Wisconsin (1961–1977)
- WJAR-DT2, a digital channel of WJAR in Providence, Rhode Island (was branded as ABC6 from December 2025 to January 2026)
- WLNE-TV in Providence, Rhode Island (1995–2025; also 1963–1977)
- WLUC-TV in Marquette, Michigan (secondary from 1956–1983; primarily from 1992–1995)
- WTVR-TV in Richmond, Virginia (1948–1960; secondary until 1956)
- XETV in San Diego, California (licensed to Tijuana, Baja California, Mexico; 1956–1973)
