= Cox Media Group =

American media company

CMG Media Corporation
- Trade name: Cox Media Group
- Type: Joint venture
- Industry: Media
- Founded: December 2008; 17 years ago
- Headquarters: Atlanta, Georgia, United States
- Key people: Daniel York (president and CEO)
- Parent: Apollo Global Management (71%); Cox Enterprises (29%)
- Divisions: Cox Newspapers; Cox Radio; Cox Television
- Website: www.cmg.com

CMG Media Corporation (doing business as Cox Media Group, and branded as CMG) is an American media conglomerate principally owned by Apollo Global Management in conjunction with Cox Enterprises, which maintains a 29% minority stake in the company. The company primarily owns radio and television stations—many of which are located in the South, Pacific Northwest, eastern Midwest, and Northeast, and the regional cable news network Pittsburgh Cable News Channel (PCNC).

Originally founded in December 2008 by Cox Enterprises through a consolidation of its existing publishing and broadcasting subsidiaries, the current incarnation of Cox Media Group was formed on December 17, 2019, through the acquisition by Apollo of the original Cox Media Group (along with Cox Enterprises' advertising subsidiary, Gamut) from Cox Enterprises, which transferred a controlling interest in the company to Apollo, and Northwest Broadcasting from Brian Brady.

== History ==
Former logo, used until May 1, 2020

In December 2008, Cox Enterprises created Cox Media Group (CMG) by merging Cox Newspapers, Cox Radio, and Cox Television into one integrated digital media company. The creation of Cox Media Group was a departure from grouping subsidiaries based solely on publishing medium.

In August 2009, Cox Enterprises realigned its radio, television, newspaper/publishing, and digital assets into the same division. Under the new structure, while the local brands remain independent, they share resources and some management. Dayton, Ohio, was considered the prototype for the media group, where radio, television, newspaper, and direct mail were all in the same market, and were combined into a new building. In other markets where the facilities are not as close together, they do share some senior management; for example, Houston and San Antonio Radio and the Austin American-Statesman newspaper all fall under the same regional vice president. In addition to the radio/TV stations and newspapers, Cox Media Group encompasses Cox Digital Solutions (digital sales for both Cox and non-Cox online and mobile properties), Cox Reps (national TV sales for station groups such as Gray and Tegna), Kudzu.com, Savings.com, and Valpak direct mail.

CMG introduced a new group-buying discount program called DealSwarm in October 2010.

In July 2012, CMG announced its intention to sell its radio stations in smaller markets: Birmingham, Greenville, Hawaii, Louisville, Richmond, and Southern Connecticut. It also intends to spin off its smaller-market television stations in El Paso, Johnstown, Reno, and Steubenville.

In April 2013, CMG launched the online-only new site Rare.us as a conservative media source, originally with the tagline "Red is the Center", and more recently "America's News Feed". After initially low audience numbers, the site expanded dramatically following more prominent use of social media and a more diverse range of stories.

On February 12, 2013, CMG announced the sale of the Birmingham, Greenville, Hawaii, Louisville, and Richmond radio stations to SummitMedia, and the southern Connecticut stations to Connoisseur Media; two weeks later, on February 25, the company announced the sale of the four television stations (and the local marketing agreement for a fifth) to Sinclair Broadcast Group.

In October 2014, Cox Digital Solutions became Gamut. Smart Media from Cox., offering media solutions to address the evolution of over-the-top media services (OTT). With this transition, CMG would cover linear television and radio, and Gamut would focus on OTT/CTV.

=== Sale of majority stake to Apollo Global Management ===
On July 24, 2018, Cox Enterprises announced that it was "exploring strategic options" for Cox Media Group's television stations, which the company said could involve "partnering or merging these stations into a larger TV company". Cox Media Group's president, Kim Guthrie, subsequently clarified to trade publication Radio & Television Business Report that the company was solely seeking "a merger or partnership" and not an outright sale of the television stations.

On February 15, 2019, Cox announced that Apollo Global Management would acquire a majority interest in the CMG television stations, as well as the Dayton radio stations and Ohio newspapers (whose operations are integrated with WHIO-TV), forming a new company that retains Cox Media Group's management and operating structure; Cox Enterprises holds a minority stake in this company. Cox's other radio stations, as well as The Atlanta Journal-Constitution, were not included in the deal; Cox had previously said that any deal involving the television stations would not include radio stations or newspapers. In March 2019 filings with the Federal Communications Commission (FCC), Apollo disclosed that the new company, tentatively named Terrier Media, would purchase the Cox stations for $3.1 billion (reduced by the value of Cox's equity stake in Terrier).

On March 18, 2019, the Atlanta Business Chronicle reported that Cox Enterprises was "exploring options" for its radio stations. The Atlanta Journal-Constitution would not be included in any potential deal for the stations.

On June 26, 2019, Cox announced that the radio stations, as well as national advertising business – CoxReps, and local OTT advertising agency - Gamut, would also be acquired by the Apollo Global Management-backed company, which concurrently announced that it would retain the Cox Media Group name instead of Terrier Media. As they would no longer be grandfathered, the new company must divest a radio station each in the Orlando and Tampa Bay markets.

Both acquisitions, along with Apollo's concurrent $384 million acquisition of Northwest Broadcasting, were approved by the FCC on November 22, 2019, under conditions imposed after a federal court blocked changes to several FCC ownership policies. To comply with regulations prohibiting the cross-ownership of broadcast stations and daily newspapers (which the FCC had sought to repeal), CMG agreed to cut publication of its Ohio newspapers to three days a week within 30 days of the deal's completion; Cox Enterprises also reduced its stake in CMG to a nonattributable interest, eliminating an ownership conflict with The Atlanta Journal-Constitution. CMG was also required to surrender the licenses to two of Northwest Broadcasting's stations, in Yuma, Arizona, and Syracuse, New York, where Northwest's existing duopolies did not comply with reinstated provisions of the FCC's duopoly rule. Cox announced the closing of the acquisition on December 17, 2019.

On February 10, 2020, Cox Enterprises announced it would repurchase the Dayton Daily News, Journal-News, and Springfield News-Sun from CMG, once again owning a 100% interest in the newspapers; the sale, which reunited the papers with The Atlanta Journal-Constitution in Cox Enterprises' newspaper holdings, allowed them to continue daily publication despite the court ruling. The sale was officially closed on March 2.

On February 22, 2022, a partnership of Standard General and Apollo announced their intent to acquire Tegna; Apollo would hold non-voting shares in the company. As part of the sale, Standard General would sell Standard Media's WDKA, WLNE, KBSI, and KLKN to CMG, and CMG would also acquire Tegna's stations in Dallas–Fort Worth, Houston, and Austin (including WFAA, KHOU, and KVUE). WFXT would be divested to Standard General. The sale was approved by Standard General and Apollo Global Management on May 17, 2022. On February 24, 2023, it was confirmed that the deal would be given a hearing before an administrative law judge, which the FCC Commissioner's Board voted to remand the merger review. The deal was terminated on May 22, 2023.

On March 30, 2022, Cox Media Group announced that it would sell 18 stations, namely KYMA in Yuma, Arizona; KIEM and KVIQ-LD in Eureka, California; KPVI in Idaho Falls, Idaho; KLAX in Alexandria, Louisiana; WABG, WNBD and WXVT in Greenwood, Mississippi; WICZ in Binghamton, New York; WSYT in Syracuse, New York; KOKI and KMYT in Tulsa, Oklahoma; KMVU and KFBI-LD in Medford, Oregon; WHBQ in Memphis, Tennessee; KAYU in Spokane, Washington; and KCYU-LD and KFFX in Yakima, Washington to Imagicomm Communications—a shell company affiliated with the cable network INSP—for an undisclosed amount. The sale was completed on August 1.

On June 18, 2024, Cox Media Group conducted a round of layoffs around the company including mostly low level management, morning show hosts, program/brand directors and promotions personnel. The exact number or positions have not been officially disclosed.

== Controversy ==
In December 2023, 404 Media reported that Cox Media Group was advertising a service to marketing professionals called "Active Listening", which involved the ability to listen to microphones installed in smartphones, smart TVs, and other devices in order to target ads to consumers. A pitch deck promoting the capability stated that it targeted "Google/Bing" and that Cox Media Group was a Google Premier Partner, but in response to questions from 404 Media, Google stated that it had removed Cox Media Group from its Partners Program after a review. In May 2026, Cox Media Group agreed to pay $880,000 to settle allegations by the Federal Trade Commission that the company had falsely claimed "to offer an AI-powered service that could target localized ads based on conversations captured from consumers' smart devices," which the company did not in fact offer.

== Radio stations ==
Cox Media Group owns, operates or provides sales and marketing services to 50 stations in 10 markets. This radio portfolio includes nine AM stations and forty-one FM stations.

Cox Radio became a public company, majority owned by Cox Enterprises, in 1996. Around April 2009, Cox Enterprises proposed a US$69-million takeover offer of Cox Radio. The offer expired on May 1, 2009. The offer was later raised to $4.80 a share, and the expiration was pushed to May 13. The offer was accepted, and the acquisition was completed on June 1.

- (**) — indicates a station built and signed on by Cox.

=== Current ===
Media market	State	Station	Purchased	Current format
Jacksonville	Florida	WOKV	2000	Sports (ESPN Radio)
Jacksonville	Florida	WAPE-FM	2000	Contemporary hit radio
Jacksonville	Florida	WOKV-FM	2000	News/talk
Jacksonville	Florida	WJGL	2000	Classic hits
Jacksonville	Florida	WEZI	2000	Soft adult contemporary
Jacksonville	Florida	WHJX	2006	Urban adult contemporary
Miami–Fort Lauderdale–Hollywood	Florida	WEDR	2000	Urban contemporary
Miami–Fort Lauderdale–Hollywood	Florida	WFLC **	1946	Rhythmic hot adult contemporary
Miami–Fort Lauderdale–Hollywood	Florida	WFEZ	2000	Soft adult contemporary
Miami–Fort Lauderdale–Hollywood	Florida	WHQT	1992	Urban adult contemporary
Orlando	Florida	WDBO	1997	News/talk
Orlando	Florida	WCFB	1997	Urban adult contemporary
Orlando	Florida	WOEX	1997	Bilingual AC
Orlando	Florida	WMMO	1997	Classic hits
Orlando	Florida	WWKA	1997	Country
Tampa–St. Petersburg–Clearwater	Florida	WDUV	1999	Soft adult contemporary
Tampa–St. Petersburg–Clearwater	Florida	WHPT	1999	Hot talk
Tampa–St. Petersburg–Clearwater	Florida	WTBV	1999	Urban adult contemporary
Tampa–St. Petersburg–Clearwater	Florida	WWRM	1993	Hot adult contemporary
Tampa–St. Petersburg–Clearwater	Florida	WXGL	1988	Classic hits
Atlanta	Georgia	WSB	1939	News/talk
Atlanta	Georgia	WALR-FM	2000	Urban adult contemporary
Atlanta	Georgia	WSBB-FM	1999	simulcasts WSB (AM)
Atlanta	Georgia	WSB-FM **	1948	Adult contemporary
Atlanta	Georgia	WSRV	2000	Classic hits
Athens	Georgia	WGAU	2008	News/talk
Athens	Georgia	WRFC	2008	Sports
Athens	Georgia	WGMG	2008	Adult contemporary
Athens	Georgia	WNGC	2008	Country
Athens	Georgia	WPUP	2008	Contemporary hit radio
Athens	Georgia	WXKT	2008	Adult hits
Nassau–Suffolk	New York	WBAB	1998	Classic rock
Nassau–Suffolk	New York	WBLI	1998	Top 40
Nassau–Suffolk	New York	WHFM	1998	simulcasts WBAB
Dayton	Ohio	WHIO **	1935	News-talk
Dayton	Ohio	WHIO-FM	1998	simulcasts WHIO (AM)
Dayton	Ohio	WHKO **	1946	Country
Dayton	Ohio	WZLR	1998	Classic hits
San Antonio	Texas	KKYX	1997	Classic country
San Antonio	Texas	KONO	1998	Business News/talk
San Antonio	Texas	KCYY	1997	Country
San Antonio	Texas	KISS-FM	1997	Mainstream rock
San Antonio	Texas	KONO-FM	1998	Classic hits
San Antonio	Texas	KTKX	1997	Classic rock
San Antonio	Texas	KSMG	1997	Hot adult contemporary

=== Former ===
Media market	State	Station
Baltimore	Maryland	WLIF
Birmingham	Alabama	WAGG
Birmingham	Alabama	WENN
Birmingham	Alabama	WBHJ
Birmingham	Alabama	WBHK
Birmingham	Alabama	WBPT
Birmingham	Alabama	WZNN
Birmingham	Alabama	WZZK-FM
Bridgeport	Connecticut	WEZN-FM
New Haven	Connecticut	WPLR
Stamford–Norwalk	Connecticut	WFOX
Orlando	Florida	WPYO
Tampa–St. Petersburg	Florida	WSUN
Honolulu	Hawaii	KKNE
Honolulu	Hawaii	KRTR
Honolulu	Hawaii	KCCN-FM
Honolulu	Hawaii	KINE-FM
Honolulu	Hawaii	KPHW
Honolulu	Hawaii	KRTR-FM
Louisville	Kentucky	WRKA
Louisville	Kentucky	WQNU
Louisville	Kentucky	WSFR
Louisville	Kentucky	WVEZ
Tulsa	Oklahoma	KRMG
Tulsa	Oklahoma	KJSR
Tulsa	Oklahoma	KRMG-FM
Tulsa	Oklahoma	KRAV-FM
Tulsa	Oklahoma	KWEN
Greenville–Spartanburg	South Carolina	WHZT
Greenville–Spartanburg	South Carolina	WJMZ-FM
Houston–Galveston	Texas	KHPT
Houston–Galveston	Texas	KGLK
Houston–Galveston	Texas	KKBQ
Houston–Galveston	Texas	KTHT
Richmond	Virginia	WJSR
Richmond	Virginia	WKHK
Richmond	Virginia	WKLR
Richmond	Virginia	WURV

=== Talk shows ===
- Clark Howard (syndicated by Westwood One)
- Rick and Bubba (syndication handled by Syndicated Solutions)

== Television stations ==
Stations are listed in alphabetical order by state and city of license.

- (**) - Indicates a station built and signed on by Cox.

=== Current stations ===
Media market	State	Station	Purchased	Affiliation	Notes
Jacksonville	Florida	WFOX-TV	2012	Fox; Telemundo (DT4)	
Jacksonville	Florida	WJAX-TV	2012	CBS	
Orlando	Florida	WFTV	1985	ABC	
Orlando	Florida	WRDQ	2001	Independent	
Atlanta	Georgia	WSB-TV **	1948	ABC	
Boston	Massachusetts	WFXT	2014	Fox	
Charlotte	North Carolina	WSOC-TV	1959	ABC; Telemundo (DT2)	
Charlotte	North Carolina	WAXN-TV	2000	Independent	
Dayton	Ohio	WHIO-TV **	1949	CBS	
Eugene	Oregon	KLSR-TV	2022	Fox	
Eugene	Oregon	KEVU-CD	2022	MyNetworkTV	
Pittsburgh	Pennsylvania	WPXI	1964	NBC	
Seattle–Tacoma	Washington	KIRO-TV	1997	CBS; Telemundo (DT4)	

=== Former stations ===
Media market	State	Station	Purchased	Sold	Notes
Yuma	Arizona	KYMA-DT	2019	2020	(Note: Operated by third parties.) (Note: In January 2020, CMG surrendered the license of KYMA (which the callsign was subsequently changed to KSWT), and moved its NBC programming to a subchannel to KSWT (which the callsign was subsequently changed to KYMA).) (Note: License for this station was cancelled.)
Yuma	Arizona	KSWT/KYMA-DT	2019	2022	
Eureka	California	KIEM-TV	2019	2022	
Eureka	California	KVIQ-LD	2019	2022	
San Francisco	California	KTVU	1963	2014	
San Francisco	California	KICU-TV	2000	2014	
Miami	Florida	WCKT **	1956	1962	(Note: Co-owned with Knight Newspapers until 1962 in an equally-divided joint venture.)
Pocatello–Idaho Falls	Idaho	KPVI-DT	2019	2022	
Alexandria	Louisiana	KLAX-TV	2019	2022	
Alexandria	Louisiana	KWCE-LP	2019	2021	
Detroit	Michigan	WKBD-TV	1984	1993	
Greenville–Greenwood	Mississippi	WABG-TV	2019	2022	
Greenville–Greenwood	Mississippi	WNBD-LD	2019	2022	
Greenville–Greenwood	Mississippi	WXVT-LD	2019	2020	
Greenville–Greenwood	Mississippi	WFXW	2019	2020	(Note: Owned by John Wagner.)
Binghamton	New York	WICZ-TV	2019	2022	
Binghamton	New York	WBPN-LP	2019	2021	
Syracuse	New York	WSYT	2019	2022	
Syracuse	New York	WNYS-TV	2019	2022	
St. Louis	Missouri	KDNL-TV	1982	1989	
Reno	Nevada	KRXI-TV	1995	2013	
Reno	Nevada	KAME-TV	1995	2013	(Note: Owned by Ellis Communications.)
Steubenville	Ohio	WTOV-TV	2000	2013	
Tulsa	Oklahoma	KOKI-TV	2012	2022	
Tulsa	Oklahoma	KMYT-TV	2012	2022	
Medford	Oregon	KMVU-DT	2019	2022	
Medford	Oregon	KFBI-LD	2019	2022	
Johnstown–Altoona	Pennsylvania	WJAC-TV	2000	2013	
Memphis	Tennessee	WHBQ-TV	2014	2022	
El Paso	Texas	KFOX-TV	1996	2013	
Seattle–Tacoma	Washington	KSTW	1997		
Spokane	Washington	KAYU-TV	2019	2022	
Tri-Cities–Yakima	Washington	KFFX-TV	2019	2022	
Tri-Cities–Yakima	Washington	KCYU-LD	2019	2022	(Note: Semi-satellite of KFFX-TV.)

=== Cable channels ===
- Pittsburgh Cable News Channel

== Former assets ==
The following outlets were at one time owned by subsidiary Cox Newspapers Inc. or CMG:

=== Daily newspapers ===
- Dayton Daily News, Dayton, Ohio
- Journal-News, Hamilton, Ohio
- Springfield News-Sun, Springfield, Ohio
- The Atlanta Journal-Constitution, Atlanta
- Austin American-Statesman, Austin, Texas
- Chandler Arizonan, Chandler, Arizona
- The Daily Advance, Elizabeth City, North Carolina
- The Daily Reflector, Greenville, North Carolina
- The Daily Sentinel, Nacogdoches, Texas
- The Grand Junction Daily Sentinel, Grand Junction, Colorado
- Longview News-Journal, Longview, Texas
- The Lufkin Daily News, Lufkin, Texas
- The Marshall News Messenger, Marshall, Texas
- Mesa Tribune, Mesa, Arizona
- Miami News, Miami, Florida
- Orange Leader, Orange, Texas
- Palm Beach Daily News, Palm Beach, Florida
- The Palm Beach Post, West Palm Beach, Florida
- Palo Verde Valley Times, Blythe, California
- Port Arthur News, Port Arthur, Texas
- Rocky Mount Telegram, Rocky Mount, North Carolina
- Scottsdale Progress, Mesa, Arizona
- Tempe Daily News, Tempe, Arizona
- Waco Tribune-Herald, Waco, Texas

=== Weekly newspapers ===
- Beaufort-Hyde News, Belhaven, North Carolina
- Bertie Ledger-Advance, Windsor, North Carolina
- The Chowan Herald, Edenton, North Carolina
- The Duplin Times, Kenansville, North Carolina
- The Enterprise, Williamston, North Carolina
- Farmville Enterprise, North Carolina
- The Nickel-Grand Junction, Grand Junction, Colorado
- Perquimans Weekly, Elizabeth City, North Carolina
- Standard Laconic, Snow Hill, North Carolina
- Times-Leader, Ayden-Grifton, North Carolina
- Weekly Herald, Robersonville, North Carolina

=== Websites ===
- Rare, Washington, D.C.
