= WABG =

WABG may refer to:

- WABG (AM), a radio station (960 AM) licensed to Greenwood, Mississippi, United States
- WABG-TV, a television station (channel 6 virtual/32 digital) licensed to Greenwood, Mississippi, United States
- The ICAO code for Waghete Airport
