= WXVT-LD =

Television station in Cleveland, Mississippi

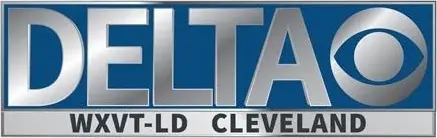
- Cleveland–Greenwood–; Greenville, Mississippi; United States
- City: Cleveland, Mississippi
- Channels: Digital: 17 (UHF); Virtual: 17
- Branding: Delta CBS; The Delta News

Programming
- Affiliations: 17.1: CBS

Ownership
- Owner: Deltavision Media; (Greenwood License LLC)
- Sister stations: WABG-TV, WNBD-LD

History
- First air date: June 26, 2017
- Former call signs: W17DI-D (2010−2011); WFXW-LD (2011−2017)
- Call sign meaning: We're XV (Roman numeral 15; former channel number) Television

Technical information
- Licensing authority: FCC
- Facility ID: 181144
- Class: LD
- ERP: 15 kW
- HAAT: 251.3 m (824 ft)
- Transmitter coordinates: 33°39′26″N 90°42′18″W

Links
- Public license information: LMS
- Website: www.deltanews.tv

WXVT-LD (channel 17) is a low-power television station licensed to Cleveland, Mississippi, United States, serving as the CBS affiliate for the Delta area. It is owned by Deltavision Media alongside dual ABC/Fox affiliate WABG-TV (channel 6) and low-powered NBC affiliate WNBD-LD (channel 33). The three stations share studios on Washington Avenue in Greenville; WXVT-LD's transmitter is located near O'Reilly, Mississippi.

== History ==
On August 25, 2009, Commonwealth Broadcasting Group, owner of WABG-TV, filed an application for a low-power television station on RF channel 17, licensed to Cleveland, Mississippi. The application was granted by the Federal Communications Commission on February 25, 2010, and the station was assigned the call sign W17DI-D. The call sign was changed to WFXW-LD on December 12, 2011. Although the construction permit dated to 2010, the channel 17 facility did not begin broadcasting until 2017.

Commonwealth Broadcasting Group agreed to sell WFXW-LD, WABG-TV, and WNBD-LD to Cala Broadcast Partners for $11.7 million on October 30, 2015. Cala is jointly owned by Brian Brady (who owns several other television stations, mostly under the Northwest Broadcasting name) and Jason Wolff (who owns radio and television stations through Frontier Radio Management). Concurrently with this acquisition, Cala agreed to purchase WXVT from H3 Communications; a month later, it assigned its right to purchase that station to John Wagner. The sale was completed on August 1, 2016.

On January 1, 2017, Cable One (now Sparklight) removed channels owned by Northwest Broadcasting after the two companies failed to reach an agreement. On February 1, 2017, the channels were restored to Cable One's lineup under a new carriage deal.

On June 26, 2017, the WXVT intellectual unit was separated from the former full-power channel 15 facility and transferred to the low-power channel 17 facility. The station subsequently changed the call sign to WXVT-LD on July 7. The former channel 15 facility remained off the air and changed its call sign to WFXW on July 25. The channel 15 facility returned to the air in 2019 as an Ion affiliate. The license was sold to Total Christian Television in 2020.

In February 2019, Reuters reported that Apollo Global Management had agreed to acquire the entirety of Brian Brady's television portfolio, which it intended to merge with Cox Media Group (which Apollo acquired at the same time) and stations spun off from Nexstar Media Group's purchase of Tribune Broadcasting, once the purchases are approved by the FCC. In March 2019 filings with the FCC, Apollo confirmed that its newly-formed broadcasting group, Terrier Media, would acquire Northwest Broadcasting, with Brian Brady holding an unspecified minority interest in Terrier. In June 2019, it was announced that Terrier Media would instead operate as Cox Media Group, as Apollo had reached a deal to also acquire Cox's radio and advertising businesses. The transaction was completed on December 17.

On March 29, 2022, Cox Media Group announced it would sell WXVT-LD, WNBD-LD, WABG-TV and 15 other stations to Imagicomm Communications, an affiliate of the parent company of the INSP cable channel, for $488 million; the sale was completed on August 1. On April 8, 2025, Imagicomm announced that the Greenville stations would be acquired by Webb Collums' Deltavision Media; the deal was consummated on August 15.

== Subchannel ==
Subchannel of WXVT-LD
Channel	Res.	Short name	Programming
17.1	1080i	WXVT-TV	CBS
