= CBS 15 =

CBS 15 may refer to one of the following television stations in the United States:

== Currently affiliates ==
- WANE-TV in Fort Wayne, Indiana
- WKOF in Syracuse, New York

== Formerly affiliated ==
- KCLO-TV in Rapid City, South Dakota (1988–2026)
- WLYH-TV (now WXBU) in Lancaster, Pennsylvania (1963–1995)
- WXVT (now WFXW) in Greenville, Mississippi (1980–2016)
