= WFXW =

Television station in Greenville, Mississippi

- Greenville–Greenwood, Mississippi; United States
- City: Greenville, Mississippi
- Channels: Digital: 15 (UHF); Virtual: 15

Programming
- Affiliations: 15.1: TCT; for others, see § Subchannels

Ownership
- Owner: Total Christian Television; (Radiant Life Ministries, Inc.)

History
- First air date: November 7, 1980
- Former call signs: WXVT (1980–2017)
- Former channel numbers: Analog: 15 (UHF, 1980–2009); Digital: 17 (UHF, until 2009)
- Former affiliations: CBS (1980–2016); UPN (secondary, 1995–2006); Silent (2016–2019); Ion Television (2019–2020)

Technical information
- Licensing authority: FCC
- Facility ID: 25236
- ERP: 190 kW
- HAAT: 269 m (883 ft)
- Transmitter coordinates: 33°39′27″N 90°42′17.2″W

Links
- Public license information: Public file; LMS
- Website: www.tct.tv

WFXW (channel 15) is a religious television station in Greenville, Mississippi, United States, owned by Total Christian Television (TCT). The station's transmitter is located near O'Reilly, Mississippi.

== History ==
In December 1974, plans were announced for a new television station to broadcast on channel 15, following a channel allocation by the Federal Communications Commission (FCC). The proposed station would operate with a signal strength of 100,000 watts and be broadcast from a 1,500-foot (457 m) tower, which would have been the tallest broadcast tower in the area at the time. It was intended to serve the Greenville area. Although the specific timeline for launching the station was not disclosed, preliminary plans aimed for it to begin broadcasting and serving the Delta area by 1976, with studios located in Greenville and the transmitter positioned northeast of the city. On October 1, 1976, an application was submitted to operate a new television station on channel 15 in Greenville. The studios were to be located on US 82 East in Greenville, while the transmitter would be positioned 1.9 miles (3.1 km) southeast of O'Reilly, Mississippi. The height of the transmitter was reduced due to a dispute with the town of Cleveland, with concerns about potential hazards for planes approaching the Bolivar County Airport. In January 1980, the station was announced to become the new CBS affiliate for the Delta area, with a tentative launch date set for September 1980. It applied for a "license to cover" on October 31, 1980.

Its first broadcast was on November 7, 1980, under the call sign WXVT. It had been a CBS affiliate for its entire existence. Before this, WJTV in Jackson had served as the default affiliate. The station was originally owned by Big River Broadcasting. Future sister station WABG-TV (channel 6, now a dual ABC/Fox affiliate) was the Delta's original CBS affiliate when it launched back in October 1959. However, a few months later, WJTV complained that WABG was encroaching on its service area. This is because WABG's signal reaches the far northern fringes of the Jackson market. Big River Broadcasting sold the station to Lamco Communications in 1984. Lamco then sold WXVT to Greenville Television, Inc. in 1991. Saga Communications purchased WXVT in 1999.

On May 1, 2012, an application was filed with the FCC to transfer ownership of WXVT from Saga Communications to H3 Communications. H3 Communications was owned by the adult children of Charles Harker, president of Commonwealth Broadcasting Group, which owned WABG and NBC affiliate WNBD-LD (channel 33). On January 28, 2013, the FCC granted the sale of WXVT, and it was completed two days later. Commonwealth then took over WXVT's operations, effectively bringing all of the Delta's Big Three network stations under the control of one company.

H3 Communications agreed to sell WXVT to Cala Broadcast Partners for $3.7 million on October 30, 2015; concurrently, Cala would purchase WABG-TV, WNBD-LD, and WFXW-LD from Commonwealth Broadcasting Group. Cala was jointly owned by Brian Brady (who owned several other television stations, mostly under the Northwest Broadcasting name) and Jason Wolff (who owned radio and television stations through Frontier Radio Management). On November 30, 2015, Cala assigned its right to purchase WXVT to John Wagner for $100,000. The sale was completed on August 1, 2016; on that date, the station went off the air, with Wagner stating in a filing with the FCC that it was looking for new programming.

On June 26, 2017, the former WXVT operation was separated into two licenses, with the WXVT intellectual unit moving to a low-power facility on channel 17 and the channel 15 facility remaining dark. The channel 15 license changed its call letters to WFXW on July 25.

On July 29, 2019, WFXW returned to the air as an affiliate of Ion Television. WHCQ-LD (channel 8) in Cleveland, Mississippi, was the Delta's original Ion affiliate from 1998 until 2011 before dropping it for MyNetworkTV.

=== Donation to TCT ===
On March 9, 2020, it was announced that John Wagner would donate WFXW to Radiant Life Ministries, an affiliate of Total Christian Television (TCT). The transaction was completed on June 12, making WFXW an owned-and-operated station of the TCT network and the first full-power religious station in the Delta area. As a result, the Ion affiliation was moved to a subchannel of WFXW on 15.2. It would also become a sister station to WWJX in Jackson.

On June 5, 2023, an application was submitted to the FCC seeking a modification of the licensed facility to reduce the power output from 330 kW to 176 kW, which also led to a decrease in the coverage area. This modification was necessitated by a new construction permit to replace the main transmitter that had been damaged. In an amended application filed on August 25, 2023, the power output was increased to 190 kW. Finally, on March 18, 2024, a license to cover for the current construction permit was submitted to the FCC.

== News operation ==
Before merging its news operation with WABG-TV in 2016, WXVT's news department was relatively small compared to those of other Big Three network affiliates, even when considering the size of the market. It lagged well behind WABG in the ratings. Unlike most CBS affiliates in the Central Time Zone, the station never aired weekday midday newscasts and did not provide a full two-hour weekday morning newscast.

As of August 2016, the station merged its news operation with that of WABG-TV (along with WNBD-LD), under the brand name The Delta News. WXVT previously produced its evening newscasts with anchor Lakiya Scott from its studios on East Reed Road in Greenville.

== Technical information ==
=== Subchannels ===
The station's signal is multiplexed:

Subchannels of WFXW
| Subchannel | Res. | Short name | Programming |
|---|---|---|---|
| 15.1 | 1080i | WFXW HD | TCT |
| 15.2 | 480i | ION | Ion |
| 15.3 | 480i | SBN | Sonlife |
| 15.4 | 480i | IONPlus | Ion Plus |
| 15.5 | 480i | GDT | Infomercials |
| 15.6 | 480i | ONTV4U | OnTV4U |

=== Analog-to-digital conversion ===
As WXVT, WFXW shut down its analog signal on UHF channel 15 on February 17, 2009, the original target date on which full-power television stations were to transition from analog to digital television under federal mandate (which was later pushed back to June 12). The station's digital signal relocated from its pre-transition UHF channel 17 to UHF channel 15.
