= Channel 6 virtual TV stations in the United States =

The following television stations operate on virtual channel 6 in the United States:

- K03ET-D in Terrace Lakes, Idaho
- K03IN-D in Leavenworth, Washington
- K04RT-D in Judith Gap, Montana
- K06NT-D in Dolores, Colorado
- K06PU-D in Yakima, Washington
- K06QA-D in Odessa, Texas
- K06QD-D in Pasco, Washington
- K06QI-D in Alamogordo, New Mexico
- K06QJ-D in Sioux Falls, South Dakota
- K06QW-D in Sentinel, Arizona
- K06QX-D in Reno, Nevada
- K07WJ-D in Colstrip, Montana
- K07WP-D in Roundup, Montana
- K07YV-D in The Dalles, Oregon
- K07ZQ-D in Georgetown, Idaho
- K07ZR-DT in Harlowton & Shawmut, Montana
- K08ET-D in Durango, Colorado
- K08ND-D in Akron, Colorado
- K09BI-D in Methow, Washington
- K09KH-D in Watkins, etc., Montana
- K09LW-D in Martinsdale/Lennep, Montana
- K09MY-D in Polaris, Montana
- K10AP-D in Pateros/Mansfield, Washington
- K10HL-D in Virginia City, Montana
- K10PV-D in Santa Barbara, California
- K11DL-D in Juliaetta, Idaho
- K11LA-D in Basin, Montana
- K11MP-D in White Sulphur Spring, Montana
- K11PP-D in Dingle, etc., Idaho
- K12LF-D in Coolin, Idaho
- K12LI-D in Thayne, etc., Wyoming
- K12LV-D in Dryden, Washington
- K12RD-D in Coulee City, Washington
- K13KP-D in Boulder, Montana
- K13KV-D in Troy, Montana
- K13UF-D in Rexburg, Idaho
- K13XW-D in Akron, Colorado
- K13XX-D in Hesperus, Colorado
- K15IB-D in Malad, Idaho
- K15JA-D in Harlowton, etc., Montana
- K15KV-D in Rockaway Beach, Oregon
- K16DH-D in Miles City, Montana
- K16DZ-D in Hardin, Montana
- K16JZ-D in McDermitt, Nevada
- K16MT-D in Leamington, Utah
- K16NJ-D in Anton, Colorado
- K17KX-D in Anton, Colorado
- K18DT-D in Coeur d'Alene, Idaho
- K18ET-D in Orderville, Utah
- K19EG-D in Holyoke, Colorado
- K19KY-D in Pocatello, Idaho
- K20GG-D in Duncan, Arizona
- K20HM-D in Idalia, Colorado
- K21LD-D in Mazama, Washington
- K21NG-D in Sandpoint, Idaho
- K22JF-D in Stemilt, etc., Washington
- K23JK-D in Tillamook, Oregon
- K23LW-D in Emigrant, Montana
- K23NL-D in Cottonwood/Grangeville, Idaho
- K23OC-D in Lincoln City/Newport, Oregon
- K23OR-D in Pagosa Springs, Colorado
- K23OV-D in Hood River, Oregon
- K24HQ-D in Boulder, Colorado
- K24KG-D in Madras, Oregon
- K24KM-D in Colstrip, etc., Montana
- K24MC-D in Baker Valley, Oregon
- K24ME-D in Milton-Freewater, Oregon
- K25BP-D in Billings, Montana
- K25OA-D in Dillon, Montana
- K26FM-D in Peetz, Colorado
- K26GX-D in Pleasant Valley, Colorado
- K26OO-D in Bonners Ferry, Idaho
- K26OP-D in Holbrook, Idaho
- K27DX-D in McCall, Idaho
- K27MW-D in Soda Springs, Idaho
- K28IT-D in Kanab, Utah
- K29BM-D in Montpelier, Idaho
- K29EL-D in La Grande, Oregon
- K29FR-D in Quanah, Texas
- K29HR-D in Farmington, New Mexico
- K29IB-D in Grays River, etc., Washington
- K30OG-D in La Grande, Oregon
- K31CR-D in Prineville, etc., Oregon
- K31CT-D in Cortez, Colorado
- K31FV-D in Durango & Hermosa, Colorado
- K31LE-D in Bridger, etc., Montana
- K32DE-D in Pendleton, Oregon
- K32KO-D in Garden Valley, Idaho
- K32LS-D in Driggs, Idaho
- K32MN-D in Howard, Montana
- K32NU-D in Haxtun, Colorado
- K33EA-D in Columbus, Montana
- K34DC-D in Astoria, Oregon
- K34JR-D in Madras, Oregon
- K34QD-D in Bayfield & Ignacio, Colorado
- K35BW-D in Lewiston, Idaho
- KAAL in Austin, Minnesota
- KAUZ-TV in Wichita Falls, Texas
- KBFW-LD in Arlington, Texas
- KBJR-TV in Superior, Wisconsin
- KBKF-LD in San Jose, California
- KBSD-DT in Ensign, Kansas
- KCEN-TV in Temple, Texas
- KCVH-LD in Houston, Texas
- KDBZ-CD in Bozeman, Montana
- KEMV in Mountain View, Arkansas
- KFDM in Beaumont, Texas
- KFLZ-LD in San Antonio, Texas
- KFMY-LD in Petaluma, California
- KFVE in Kailua-Kona, Hawaii
- KHQ-TV in Spokane, Washington
- KHTV-CD in Los Angeles, California
- KIDY in San Angelo, Texas
- KIVI-TV in Nampa, Idaho
- KMCF-LD in Visalia, California
- KMOH-TV in Kingman, Arizona
- KMOS-TV in Sedalia, Missouri
- KNIK-LD in Anchorage, Alaska
- KOIN in Portland, Oregon
- KOTV-DT in Tulsa, Oklahoma
- KPLO-TV in Reliance, South Dakota
- KPTW in Casper, Wyoming
- KPVI-DT in Pocatello, Idaho
- KREZ-TV in Durango, Colorado
- KRIS-TV in Corpus Christi, Texas
- KRMA-TV in Denver, Colorado
- KRVD-LD in Banning, California
- KSAW-LD in Twin Falls, Idaho
- KSBY in San Luis Obispo, California
- KSNL-LD in Salina, Kansas
- KSRE in Minot, North Dakota
- KSVI in Billings, Montana
- KTAL-TV in Texarkana, Texas
- KTVM-TV in Butte, Montana
- KTVW-CD in Flagstaff/Doney Park, Arizona
- KUAT-TV in Tucson, Arizona
- KVIE in Sacramento, California
- KWFT-LD in Fort Smith, Arkansas
- KWNB-LD in McCook, Nebraska
- KWNB-TV in Hayes Center, Nebraska
- KWQC-TV in Davenport, Iowa
- KYMU-LD in Seattle, Washington
- KZFW-LD in Dallas, Texas
- W06DA-D in Aguada, Puerto Rico
- W06DG-D in Evansville, Indiana
- W06DI-D in Jasper, Florida
- W14EM-D in Marquette, Michigan
- W26EQ-D in State College, Pennsylvania
- W26FA-D in Marion, North Carolina
- W29DH-D in Moorefield, West Virginia
- WABG-TV in Greenwood, Mississippi
- WATE-TV in Knoxville, Tennessee
- WBRC in Birmingham, Alabama
- WCML in Alpena, Michigan
- WCSH in Portland, Maine
- WCTV in Thomasville, Georgia
- WDAY-TV in Fargo, North Dakota
- WDCN-LD in Fairfax, Virginia
- WDSU in New Orleans, Louisiana
- WECT in Wilmington, North Carolina
- WFIB-LD in Key West, Florida
- WGCE-CD in Rochester, New York
- WIPR-TV in San Juan, Puerto Rico
- WITI in Milwaukee, Wisconsin
- WJAC-TV in Johnstown, Pennsylvania
- WJBF in Augusta, Georgia
- WJMF-LD in Jackson, Mississippi
- WKMG-LD in Ocala, Florida
- WKMG-TV in Orlando, Florida
- WLNE-TV in New Bedford, Massachusetts
- WLNS-TV in Lansing, Michigan
- WLUC-TV in Marquette, Michigan
- WNYZ-LD in New York City, New York
- WOOT-LD in Chattanooga, Tennessee
- WOWT in Omaha, Nebraska
- WPSD-TV in Paducah, Kentucky
- WPVI-TV in Philadelphia, Pennsylvania
- WRGB in Schenectady, New York
- WRTN-LD in Alexandria, Tennessee
- WRTV in Indianapolis, Indiana
- WSYX in Columbus, Ohio
- WTBS-LD in Atlanta, Georgia
- WTCL-LD in Cleveland, Ohio
- WTVJ in Miami, Florida
- WTVR-TV in Richmond, Virginia
- WVOA-LD in Westvale, New York
- WVVA in Bluefield, West Virginia

The following stations, which are no longer licensed, formerly operated on virtual channel 6:

- K06LG-D in Chuathbaluk, Alaska
- K06NG-D in Sargents, Colorado
- K16HQ-D in Georgetown, Idaho
- K21NL-D in Howard, Montana
- K26NR-D in Rainier, Oregon
- K34IF-D in Wallowa, Oregon
- K47LM-D in Prineville, etc., Oregon
- KIPS-LD in Beaumont, Texas
