= NBC 33 =

NBC 33 may refer to one of the following television stations in the United States:

== Current ==
- WNBD-LD in Grenada, Mississippi
- WVLA-TV in Baton Rouge, Louisiana

== Former ==
- KKTU (now KQCK) in Cheyenne, Wyoming (1987 to 2003)
- WEEU-TV in Reading, Pennsylvania (1953 to 1956)
- WKJG-TV/WISE-TV in Fort Wayne, Indiana (1953 to 2016)
