= Beaufort-Hyde News =

- Type: Weekly newspaper
- Owner: Cooke Communications
- Founded: 1966
- Ceased publication: 2013
- Language: English
- OCLC number: 37395371

Beaufort-Hyde News was a weekly newspaper based in Belhaven, North Carolina. The Coastal Observer was merged into the Beaufort-Hyde News in 1990.

Cox Newspapers sold the paper to Cooke Communications in 2009. The paper closed in 2013.
