= KFBI-LD =

Television station in Medford, Oregon

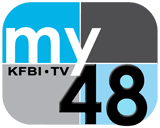
- Medford, Oregon; United States
- Channels: Digital: 19 (UHF); Virtual: 48
- Branding: My 48; Telemundo Medford (48.2)

Programming
- Affiliations: 48.1: H&I; MyNetworkTV (secondary); 48.2: Telemundo

Ownership
- Owner: Marquee Broadcasting; (Marquee Broadcasting West, Inc.)
- Sister stations: KMVU-DT

History
- First air date: July 3, 2006
- Former channel numbers: Analog: 63 (UHF, 2005–2006), 48 (UHF, 2006–2009); Digital: 48 (UHF, 2009–2018)
- Former affiliations: Independent (July–September 2006); MyNetworkTV (primary, 2006–2018)

Technical information
- Licensing authority: FCC
- Facility ID: 130106
- Class: LD
- ERP: 0.25 kW
- HAAT: 447 m (1,467 ft)
- Transmitter coordinates: 42°17′53.4″N 122°45′1.1″W
- Translator(s): K26NB-D Klamath Falls

Links
- Public license information: LMS
- Website: kfbimy48.com

KFBI-LD (channel 48) is a low-power television station in Medford, Oregon, United States, affiliated with Heroes & Icons, MyNetworkTV, and Telemundo. It is owned by Marquee Broadcasting alongside Fox affiliate KMVU-DT (channel 26). The two stations share studios on Crater Lake Avenue in Medford; KFBI-LD's transmitter is located atop Mount Baldy, near Phoenix, Oregon.

== History ==
KFBI was founded in 2006 by Sainte Partners II, L.P. owner Chester Smith to bring one of his stations to the Medford market. The station hit the air on July 3, 2006, about one month before the official launch of MyNetworkTV; the station launched with the network's imaging to save the costs of a two-month interim brand. The operations were out of the Sainte offices in Chico, California, home of KCVU, MyTV Northern California and three Spanish stations. The sales offices were located on North Riverside Avenue in Medford and Peter Rogers, former general manager at KMVU, served as the station's first full-time general manager.

In November 2007, it was announced that KFBI and sister station KMCW-LP were up for sale, but they were never purchased. The stations remained Sainte property.

In April 2012, KFBI owners Sainte Television Group (aka Sainte Partners II) entered into a local marketing agreement with Bonten Media Group, a New York-based private equity group that owns Northern California ABC and MeTV affiliates KRCR-TV in Redding, California, and KAEF-TV in Eureka, California (the two stations are now owned by the Sinclair Broadcast Group). KFBI and its sister station KMCW were not included in the package. They were being sold to Northwest Broadcasting, owner of KMVU-DT, on July 22, 2013. Upon the sale, the station replaced This TV with Telemundo, thus airing KMCW on channels 14 and 48.2. ThisTV now airs on KOBI-TV channel 5.2; KMCW's license was canceled on March 17, 2016.

In February 2019, Reuters reported that Apollo Global Management had agreed to acquire all of Brian Brady's television portfolio, which it intended to merge with Cox Media Group (which Apollo was acquiring at the same time) and stations spun off from Nexstar Media Group's purchase of Tribune Broadcasting, once the purchases were approved by the Federal Communications Commission (FCC). In March 2019 filings with the FCC, Apollo confirmed that its newly formed broadcasting group, Terrier Media, would acquire Northwest Broadcasting, with Brian Brady holding an unspecified minority interest in Terrier. In June 2019, it was announced that Terrier Media would instead operate as Cox Media Group, as Apollo had reached a deal to also acquire Cox's radio and advertising businesses. The transaction was completed on December 17.

On March 29, 2022, Cox Media Group announced it would sell KFBI-LD, KMVU-DT and 16 other stations to Imagicomm Communications, an affiliate of the parent company of the INSP cable channel, for $488 million; the sale was completed on August 1.

On January 16, 2025, it was announced that Marquee Broadcasting would purchase KFBI-LD and KMVU-DT from Imagicomm (Imagicomm Medford, LLC) after the company announced it would sell 12 of its stations. The transaction was completed on May 1.

=== KFBI-DT2 Telemundo 48.2 ===
KFBI began airing Telemundo on its sub-channel 48.2 while at the same time continuing to air it on its sister station KMCW-LP (channel 14).

== Technical information ==
=== Subchannels ===
The station's signal is multiplexed:

Subchannels of KFBI-LD
Subchannel	Res.	Short name	Programming
48.1	720p	MyNetwk	Heroes & Icons (primary); MyNetworkTV (secondary)
48.2	720p	Telemun	Telemundo

=== Translator ===
- K26NB-D Klamath Falls

== Cable and satellite coverage ==
KFBI became available on local cable TV via Charter Communications on channel 3 in both Medford and Klamath Falls as of September 5, 2006.

KFBI, as of October 10, 2007, also became available on Dish Network on channels 48 and 7648.
