= Imagicomm Communications =

American television broadcasting company

- Type: Private
- Industry: Broadcast television
- Founded: March 30, 2022
- Founder: David Cerullo
- Headquarters: Indian Land, South Carolina, U.S.
- Area served: United States (Midwest, Northeast, Northwest, Southeast, and Southwest)
- Key people: David Cerullo (President)
- Products: Broadcast television
- Website: www.imagicomm.com

Imagicomm Communications was an American television broadcasting company controlled by the INSP network. It owned 18 TV stations across 13 different markets in the United States before its closure.

The company's name is now used solely for station licensing.

== History ==
In 2022, it was announced that Imagicomm would be acquiring 12 stations across different markets from Cox Media Group. The acquisition of the 12 stations was said to total $488 million when it was completed in August 2022. On completion of the deal, Imagicomm became a brand-new broadcast TV licensee, with previous operations focused on INSP.

The deal included two stations from California, KIEM and KVIQ-LD. Other stations included WABG-TV, WNBD-LD, and WXVT-LD in Mississippi, KPVI in Idaho, KLAX in Louisiana, KOKI and KMYT in Oklahoma, WICZ and WSYT in New York, KYMA in Arizona, KMVU and KFBI in Oregon, WHBQ in Tennessee, and KAYU, KCYU-LD, and KFFX in Washington.

In early 2024, Imagicomm announced that it was implementing a cloud-based news production platform at two of its stations. This was following a partnership with the software firm, Blackbird.

On January 15, 2025, Imagicomm announced it would put its stations up for sale. The chain was dismantled by three separate deals: Marquee Broadcasting purchased four stations, Rincon Broadcasting Group purchased seven stations and Deltavision Media purchased the remaining seven stations, resulting in Imagicomm exiting the broadcasting business by default.

== List of stations ==
Media market	State	Station	Channel
Yuma	Arizona	KYMA-DT	11, 13
Eureka	California	KIEM-TV	3
Eureka	California	KVIQ-LD	14
Pocatello–Idaho Falls	Idaho	KPVI-DT	6
Alexandria	Louisiana	KLAX-TV	31
Greenwood	Mississippi	WABG-TV	6
Greenwood	Mississippi	WNBD-LD	33
Greenwood	Mississippi	WXVT-LD	17
Binghamton	New York	WICZ-TV	40
Syracuse	New York	WSYT	43, 68
Tulsa	Oklahoma	KOKI-TV	23
Tulsa	Oklahoma	KMYT-TV	41
Medford	Oregon	KMVU-DT	26
Medford	Oregon	KFBI-LD	48
Memphis	Tennessee	WHBQ-TV	13
Kennewick	Washington	KFFX-TV	11
Spokane	Washington	KAYU-TV	28
Yakima	Washington	KCYU-LD (Note: Semi-satellite of KFFX-TV.)	41
