= Northwest Broadcasting =

American television broadcasting company (1995–2019)

Northwest Broadcasting, Inc.
- Type: Private
- Founded: 1995; 31 years ago
- Defunct: December 17, 2019; 6 years ago
- Fate: Acquired by Cox Media Group
- Successor: Cox Media Group
- Headquarters: Okemos, Michigan, U.S.
- Key people: Brian Brady (president & CEO)

Northwest Broadcasting, Inc. was a television broadcasting company based in Okemos, Michigan, United States, a suburb of Lansing. The broadcasting group owned or operated twelve television stations in six markets, through subsidiaries such as Broadcasting Communications, Mountain Communications, Stainless Broadcasting, and Bristlecone Broadcasting.

== History ==
Northwest Broadcasting was founded in 1995 by Brian Brady to acquire the television stations of Salmon River Communications, including KAYU-TV in Spokane, Washington, K68EB in Yakima, Washington, KBWU-LP in the Tri-Cities (Richland-Kennewick-Pasco, Washington), and KMVU in Medford, Oregon. In 1997, Northwest purchased Stainless, Inc. for $17 million; while Stainless was primarily a manufacturer of broadcasting towers, the purchase also added WICZ-TV in Binghamton, New York, and KTVZ in Bend, Oregon, to Northwest's station group. Stainless had owned broadcast stations since purchasing WICZ (then known as WINR-TV) in 1971. Though Northwest would sell the Stainless tower company to SpectraSite Holdings in 1999 and KTVZ to News-Press & Gazette Company in 2002, it still owns WICZ-TV under the Stainless Broadcasting Company name.

Brian Brady expanded his broadcast holdings in 2002, when he teamed up with Alta Communications to acquire the K-Six Television stations under the name Eagle Creek Broadcasting; Alta had also invested in Northwest Broadcasting in 1996. Alta divested its interest in Northwest Broadcasting in 2007 and in Eagle Creek Broadcasting in 2013. During the 2010s, Brady acquired additional stations through companies such as Blackhawk Broadcasting, Bristlecone Broadcasting, and Cedar Creek Broadcasting. These companies have occasionally made joint filings with Northwest Broadcasting in Federal Communications Commission proceedings under the name "The TV Station Group."

In February 2019, Reuters reported that Apollo Global Management had agreed to acquire the entirety of Brian Brady's television portfolio, which it intends to merge with Cox Media Group (which Apollo is acquiring at the same time) and stations spun off from Nexstar Media Group's purchase of Tribune Broadcasting, once the purchases are approved by the FCC. In March 2019 filings with the Federal Communications Commission (FCC), Apollo confirmed that its newly-formed broadcasting group, Terrier Media, would acquire Northwest Broadcasting, with Brian Brady holding an unspecified minority interest in Terrier. In June 2019, it was announced that Terrier Media would instead operate as Cox Media Group, as Apollo had reached a deal to also acquire Cox's radio and advertising businesses. The transaction was completed on December 17.

== Former stations ==
- Stations are arranged in alphabetical order by state and city of license.

Stations owned by Northwest Broadcasting
Media market	State	Station	Purchased	Sold	Notes
Yuma	Arizona	KSWT	2014	2019	(Note: Operated by News-Press & Gazette Company.)
Yuma	Arizona	KYMA-DT	2014	2019	
Eureka	California	KIEM-TV	2017	2019	
Eureka	California	KVIQ	2016	2017	
Eureka	California	KVIQ-LD	2016	2019	
Pocatello–Idaho Falls	Idaho	KPVI-DT	2016	2019	
Twin Falls	Idaho	KXTF	2016	2017	
Bowling Green	Kentucky	WNKY	1997	2003	(Note: Known as WKNT prior to 2001.)
Alexandria	Louisiana	KLAX-TV	2018	2019	
Alexandria	Louisiana	KWCE-LP	2018	2019	
Greenville–Greenwood	Mississippi	WABG-TV	2016	2019	
Greenville–Greenwood	Mississippi	WFXW	2016	2019	(Note: Owned by a third party and operated by Northwest Broadcasting.)
Greenville–Greenwood	Mississippi	WNBD-LD	2016	2019	
Greenville–Greenwood	Mississippi	WXVT-LD	2017	2019	
Binghamton	New York	WBPN-LP	2000	2019	
Binghamton	New York	WICZ-TV	1997	2019	
Syracuse	New York	WNYS-TV	2013	2019	(Note: Solely operated by Northwest Broadcasting from 2013 until 2018.)
Syracuse	New York	WSYT	2013	2019	
Bend	Oregon	KTVZ	1997	2002	
Medford	Oregon	KFBI-LD	2013	2019	
Medford	Oregon	KMCW-LP	2013	2016	
Medford	Oregon	KMVU-DT	1995	2019	
Corpus Christi	Texas	KZTV	2002	2010	
Laredo	Texas	KNEX-LP	2012	2015	
Laredo	Texas	KVTV	2002	2015	
Spokane	Washington	KAYU-TV	1996	2019	
Tri-Cities–Yakima	Washington	KCYU-LD	1996	2019	(Note: Semi-satellite of KFFX-TV.)
Tri-Cities–Yakima	Washington	KFFX-TV	1999	2019	(Note: Solely operated by Northwest Broadcasting from 1999 until 2003.)
Walla Walla	Washington	KBKI	2001	2002	
