= KHMT =

Television station in Hardin, Montana

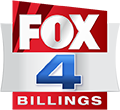
- Hardin–Billings, Montana; United States
- City: Hardin, Montana
- Channels: Digital: 22 (UHF); Virtual: 4
- Branding: Fox 4

Programming
- Affiliations: 4.1: Fox; for others, see § Subchannels

Ownership
- Owner: Mission Broadcasting, Inc.
- Operator: Nexstar Media Group
- Sister stations: KSVI

History
- First air date: November 26, 1980
- Former call signs: KOUS-TV (1980–1995)
- Former channel numbers: Analog: 4 (VHF, 1980–2009)
- Former affiliations: Independent (1980–1982); NBC (secondary 1980–1982, primary 1982–1987); ABC (1987–1993); Dark (1993–1995); UPN (secondary, c. 1997–2006)
- Call sign meaning: Hardin, Montana

Technical information
- Licensing authority: FCC
- Facility ID: 47670
- ERP: 1,000 kW
- HAAT: 247.5 m (812 ft)
- Transmitter coordinates: 45°44′25″N 108°8′20.3″W
- Translator(s): see § Translators

Links
- Public license information: Public file; LMS
- Website: www.yourbigsky.com

KHMT (channel 4) is a television station licensed to Hardin, Montana, United States, serving as the Fox affiliate for the Billings area. It is owned by Mission Broadcasting and operated by Nexstar Media Group alongside dual ABC/CW affiliate KSVI (channel 6). The two stations share studios on South 24th Street West in Billings; KHMT's transmitter is located in unincorporated southeastern Yellowstone County (southeast of Indian Arrow).

Mid-Rivers Communications (based in Circle, Montana) carries KHMT on cable in Glendive, Montana (the smallest DMA in the U.S. according to Nielsen), as that market has no local Fox affiliate of its own.

== History ==
The station signed on November 26, 1980, as KOUS-TV, owned by a company that shared two stockholders with KYUS-TV (channel 3) in Miles City. In 1982, KOUS became a primary NBC affiliate, which Billings lacked at the time; while the station already carried some NBC programming, it had primarily been an independent station. Since 1968, NBC had largely been relegated to secondary clearances on CBS affiliate KTVQ (channel 2) and ABC affiliate KULR-TV (channel 8)—as was PBS until 1984. Billings was one of the last markets in the nation to receive full service from all three networks. In 1984, the ownership of KOUS and KYUS was formally consolidated when KOUS' owners bought KYUS for $200,000; afterward, KYUS, which had been a separate station, became a satellite of KOUS.

In 1987, NBC chose to move its affiliation from KOUS-TV to KULR-TV (which had been a primary affiliate of the network from 1958 to 1968) effective that August; at that time, the stations swapped affiliations, and channel 4 picked up KULR's former ABC affiliation. That September, KOUS' programming began to be simulcast in Bozeman on new station KCTZ. Shortly afterward, the station's owner changed its name from KOUS-TV, Inc. to Big Horn Communications.

KOUS-TV's tower was located 18 miles (29 km) east of Billings, which resulted in difficult reception in portions of the city; as a result, in 1987, the station established a translator, K25BP channel 25, in Billings. Big Horn subsequently obtained a construction permit for channel 6 in Billings (a channel that was originally intended to be used on a noncommercial basis in Miles City before being reallocated to Billings). On January 8, 1993, KOUS-TV signed off from channel 4, and the KOUS intellectual unit moved to channel 6 as KSVI, which inherited KOUS' ABC affiliation. KOUS' satellite stations, KYUS-TV and KCTZ, immediately became satellites of KSVI; translator K25BP also began to carry channel 6's programming. (Note: KYUS is now a part of Montana PBS, while KCTZ is now KBZK, a satellite of KXLF-TV in Butte.)

The following year, Big Horn sold the channel 4 license to the National Indian Media Foundation, which entered into a local marketing agreement with KSVI. The agreement allowed channel 4 to resume broadcasting August 16, 1995, as Fox affiliate KHMT, operating from the same tower it had used as KOUS. Under the foundation's ownership, KHMT claimed to be the only full power television station to have 100 percent Native American ownership; the station was also the first primary Fox affiliate in Montana. Between 1991 and 1994, Foxnet served as the network's cable-only affiliate for the Billings market; this ended when KSVI became a secondary affiliate of Fox, which lasted for approximately one year. By 1997, KHMT had added a secondary affiliation with UPN, shared with KSVI; this continued until that network shut down in 2006.

Wolf Mountain Broadcasting, the subsidiary of the National Indian Media Foundation that became the station's licensee in 1997, sold KHMT to VHR Broadcasting in 2002. In 2003, Mission Broadcasting acquired the station from VHR; the sale coincided with the merger of Quorum Broadcasting (which by then owned KSVI) with Nexstar Broadcasting Group.

== News operation ==
KOUS-TV first started a news operation in 1982; this newscast was short-lived and was eventually canceled. As KHMT, another news operation, shared with sister station KSVI, was launched on April 18, 2002; after 18 months, the newscasts were canceled in September 2003, following Nexstar taking control of the stations. Though the news operation had won Montana Broadcasters Association and Associated Press awards during its run, it was not successful in the ratings: KHMT's prime time newscast reportedly pulled in only 3 percent viewing shares, putting it behind KTVQ and KULR in a distant third. At the time, Nexstar said ending the news operation would mean the difference between a profit and a loss. Local officials were also thrown off by KHMT reporters, who were aggressive about their news coverage and questioning in a manner not previously known in the state among other news operations.

== Technical information ==
=== Subchannels ===
The station's signal is multiplexed:

Subchannels of KHMT
| Subchannel | Res. | Short name | Programming |
|---|---|---|---|
| 4.1 | 720p | KHMT-TV | Fox |
| 4.2 | 480i | CourtTV | Court TV → Outlaw (soon) |
| 4.3 | 480i | Laff | Laff |
| 4.4 | 480i | Ion | Ion |

=== Translators ===
- K27IM-D Billings
- K33LG-D Bridger
- K20LK-D Colstrip
- K08FS-D Dodson
- K19JM-D Emigrant
- K18MZ-D Forsyth
- K17KZ-D Harlowton, etc.
- K32MS-D Livingston
- K11IH-D Malta
- K19FF-D Miles City
- K28MK-D Phillips County
- K34QX-D Roundup
- K17KU-D Saco
- K13HK-D Sand Springs
- K06NV-D White Sulphur Springs
- K07IB-D Whitewater

=== Analog-to-digital conversion ===
KHMT's broadcasts became digital-only, effective June 12, 2009.
