= KMVU-DT =

Television station in Medford, Oregon

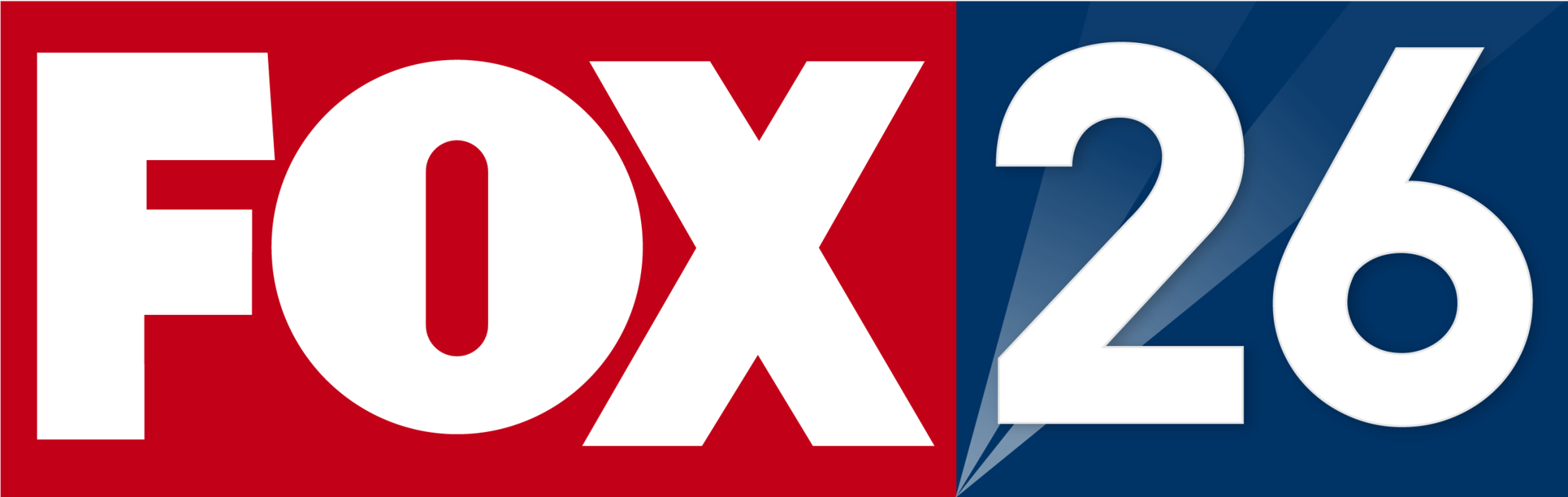

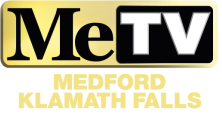
- Medford–Klamath Falls, Oregon; United States
- City: Medford, Oregon
- Channels: Digital: 26 (UHF); Virtual: 26
- Branding: Fox 26

Programming
- Affiliations: 26.1: Fox; 26.2: MeTV; 26.3: Ion

Ownership
- Owner: Marquee Broadcasting; (Marquee Broadcasting West, Inc.)
- Sister stations: KFBI-LD

History
- First air date: August 8, 1994
- Former call signs: KMVU (1994–2009)
- Former channel numbers: Analog: 26 (UHF, 1994–2009); Digital: 27 (UHF, 2001–2009)
- Call sign meaning: Medford Vu (View); -or-; Medford Rogue Valley UHF

Technical information
- Licensing authority: FCC
- Facility ID: 32958
- ERP: 16.2 kW
- HAAT: 441 m (1,447 ft)
- Transmitter coordinates: 42°17′53.4″N 122°44′57.1″W
- Translator(s): see § Translators

Links
- Public license information: Public file; LMS
- Website: fox26medford.com

KMVU-DT (channel 26) is a television station in Medford, Oregon, United States, affiliated with the Fox network. It is owned by Marquee Broadcasting alongside low-power station KFBI-LD (channel 48). The two stations share studios on Avion Drive in Medford; KMVU-DT's transmitter is located atop Mount Baldy, near Phoenix, Oregon.

== History ==
The station was founded on August 8, 1994, by Bob and June Sheehan. The station's start-up was funded by Salmon River Communications under a leased management agreement between the Sheehans and Salmon River's CEO, Robert J. Hamacher. Prior to the station's sign on, Medford residents could only receive Fox programming via the national Foxnet service. Hamaker appointed Peter Rogers as the station's original general manager in July 1994 after the transfer of control of the station from the Sheehans to Salmon River was approved by the Federal Communications Commission (FCC). Rogers came from KRON-TV, San Francisco's then-NBC affiliate, where he had established his credentials in television station programming, operations, production, and administration. Rogers managed KMVU from 1994 to 2004. Salmon River sold the station to Northwest Broadcasting in 1998.

In February 2019, Reuters reported that Apollo Global Management had agreed to acquire the entirety of Brian Brady's television portfolio, which it intended to merge with Cox Media Group (which was also being bought by Apollo) and stations spun off from Nexstar Media Group's purchase of Tribune Broadcasting, once the purchases are approved by the FCC. In March 2019 filings with the FCC, Apollo confirmed that its newly-formed broadcasting group, Terrier Media, would acquire Northwest Broadcasting, with Brian Brady holding an unspecified minority interest in Terrier. In June 2019, it was announced that Terrier Media would instead operate as Cox Media Group, as Apollo had reached a deal to also acquire Cox's radio and advertising businesses. The transaction was completed on December 17.

On March 29, 2022, Cox Media Group announced it would sell KMVU-DT, KFBI-LD and 16 other stations to Imagicomm Communications, an affiliate of the parent company of the INSP cable channel, for $488 million; the sale was completed on August 1.

On January 16, 2025, it was announced that Marquee Broadcasting would purchase KMVU-DT and KFBI-LD from Imagicomm (Imagicomm Medford, LLC) after the company announced it would sell 12 of its stations. The transaction was completed on May 1.

== News operation ==
In 2006, the station began broadcasting Fox 26 First at Ten, a 10 o'clock local news program produced by KMVU competitor KOBI-TV. The newscast is currently anchored by Shellye Leggette, with meteorologist Matt Jordan handling weather.

On January 10, 2011, KMVU launched a new morning news program called Fox 26 Morning News Live at Seven. The newscast was last anchored by Blakely McHugh and Kyle Aevermann.

Only a 10 p.m. newscast was produced and aired on the weekends. It was anchored by Madison Laberge and weather forecaster Nicole Constantino.

KMVU announced it would end local newscasts on December 29, 2023, with the 7 a.m. slot being replaced by The People's Court and the 10 p.m. half hour slot being replaced by Two and a Half Men.

KMVU announced the return of local newscasts titled Fox 26 First News at 10 on June 9, 2025, for the first time since December 29, 2023, replacing Suits on weekdays, and other programming on weekends.

== Technical information ==
=== Subchannels ===
The station's signal is multiplexed:

Subchannels of KMVU-DT
Channel	Res.	Short name	Programming
26.1	720p	KMVU-HD	Fox
26.2	480i	MeTV	MeTV
26.3	480i	ION	Ion

=== Analog-to-digital conversion ===
KMVU shut down its analog signal, over UHF channel 26, on February 17, 2009, the original target date on which full-power television stations in the United States were to transition from analog to digital broadcasts under federal mandate (which was later pushed back to June 12, 2009). The station's digital signal relocated from its pre-transition UHF channel 27 to channel 26.

=== Translators ===
- K31GP-D Brookings
- K34NO-D Grants Pass
- K32LQ-D Yreka, CA

== Cable and satellite carriage disputes ==
=== Northland Cable TV (2007–2008) ===
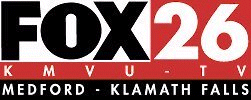
Original FOX 26 logo

On May 6, 2007, KMVU was replaced by Chico, California, Fox affiliate KCVU-TV on Northland Cable Television channel 13 in both Mt. Shasta and Yreka, California. This was after KMVU and Northland could not agree to remain on the cable system. Northland also carries KCVU's sister station KRVU-LD My 21 on cable channel 2. Northland was blocked from airing Fox network programming as a result.

On May 14, 2008, the FCC issued two Notices of Apparent Liability and Forfeitures to Northland. These were a result of failing to provide thirty days notice to KMVU and cable customers that KMVU would be moved to a different channel and dropped eventually. The two NALs totaled $40,000. According to standard procedure, Northland had thirty days to either pay the fine or ask for a reduction or cancellation.

In November 2008, KMVU won the contract dispute with Northland Cable. KMVU returned to its previous channel on both Mt. Shasta and Yreka, forcing KCVU to be removed.

=== DirecTV (2010–2012) ===
KMVU underwent a carriage dispute with DirecTV, similar to a dispute between Dish Network and KDRV. This dispute threatened to blackout the 2010–2011 NFC Championship Game between the Green Bay Packers and the Chicago Bears on January 23, 2011. The 2011 Pro Bowl and Super Bowl XLV were also at risk for blackouts. The dispute was temporarily resolved.

However, on August 13, 2012, DirecTV dropped KMVU from its service and line-up. This prompted station owner Northwest Broadcasting to issue a statement regarding the issue. As a result, KMVU has started airing promos asking viewers to find other alternatives to watch their station to make their feelings known about the controversy.

On October 25, 2012, KMVU returned to DirecTV.

=== Dish Network (2020–present) ===
On January 18, 2020, KMVU announced that a carriage dispute with Dish Network had led to a blackout after the previous carriage agreement had expired at 4 p.m. that day. As of February 2, 2020, the dispute remained unresolved, leaving Dish customers' prospects of watching Super Bowl LV in doubt.
