= KLAX-TV =

Television station in Alexandria, Louisiana

- Alexandria, Louisiana; United States
- Channels: Digital: 31 (UHF); Virtual: 31
- Branding: KLAX ABC 31; ABC 31 News

Programming
- Affiliations: 31.1: ABC; 31.2: MeTV; 31.3: Ion

Ownership
- Owner: Deltavision Media; (Alexandria License LLC)

History
- Founded: 1979
- First air date: March 3, 1983
- Former channel numbers: Analog: 31 (UHF, 1983–2009); Digital: 32 (UHF, until 2009)
- Former affiliations: Independent (1983–1985); UPN (secondary, 1995–2000)
- Call sign meaning: Louisiana Alexandria

Technical information
- Licensing authority: FCC
- Facility ID: 52907
- ERP: 200 kW
- HAAT: 333 m (1,093 ft)
- Transmitter coordinates: 31°33′55″N 92°33′0″W

Links
- Public license information: Public file; LMS
- Website: klax-tv.com

KLAX-TV (channel 31) is a television station in Alexandria, Louisiana, United States, affiliated with ABC and owned by Deltavision Media. The station's studios are located on England Drive/LA 498 in Alexandria, and its transmitter is located in the Kisatchie National Forest southwest of Dry Prong.

KLAX-TV began broadcasting on March 3, 1983, as an independent station. It was built by Cypress Communications, a local firm, and featured a local newscast from its launch until August 1984. The station became an ABC affiliate in September 1985; after failing to pay its bills, it filed for bankruptcy protection in 1987 and was sold to Pollack-Belz Communications in 1988. Pollack-Belz revived a news department, which continued until 2001, but the station could not pass established KALB-TV in the news ratings. A local newscast, this time with outsourced production, returned in 2007. Pollack/Belz sold the station to Northwest Broadcasting in 2018, the first of four sales of KLAX-TV within seven years.

== History ==
=== Construction and early years ===
Plans for KLAX began in September 1979 when Jim Richards, who had been the general manager of KSYL radio, formed Cypress Communications with the intent on launching a new television station on one of the two available commercial UHF channels (channel 31 or 41). Two months later, Cypress filed for channel 31, receiving a construction permit in July 1980. The company planned for the station to be an ABC affiliate and to start the station on August 1, 1981. ABC rejected KLAX's proposal to become an affiliate, and the poor economy prompted Cypress to delay the station's startup.

By late 1982, KLAX-TV was moving forward as an independent station. The station began broadcasting on March 3, 1983, with a 31-hour preview of programming followed by a marathon of 31 movies. The station at launch featured several local programs, including two programs (Great Day in the Morning and Midday) hosted by local radio personality Bill Day and 6 and 10 p.m. local newscasts. Initially, it broadcast from a 250-foot (76 m) tower at its studios on England Drive, which was intended as a stopgap until its 1,290-foot (390 m) tower near Dry Prong could be completed. The evening newscasts were reorganized into a single 9 p.m. edition that October before being dropped and replaced with short hourly newsbreaks in September 1984.

On September 23, 1985, KLAX-TV became an ABC affiliate after the network accepted a new proposal. Prior to this, area cable companies had piped in either WBRZ from Baton Rouge, KATC from Lafayette, or KBMT of Beaumont, Texas, all with weak signals. Great Day remained on the air until it was canceled in April 1986.

In 1986, Cypress put KLAX-TV up for sale amid financial troubles. By August 1986, six creditors headlined by RCA had sued the station for failure to meet financial obligations. Three months later, an investor consortium consisting of two men affiliated with Rollins Inc. and Russ Chambers, former owner of KPLC in Lake Charles, agreed to buy the station for $7 million. The transaction never closed and was abandoned by May 1987, when RCA seized the station's transmitter and studio equipment with a view to selling it at auction. RCA's attorney told The Town Talk that he was displeased with KLAX's continued use of the equipment. In response, Cypress filed for Chapter 11 bankruptcy protection.

=== Pollack-Belz ownership ===
The bankruptcy court received offers from Texas-based Delta Television and Pollack-Belz Communications of Memphis for the station. William Pollack, the principal in Pollack-Belz, had learned of the bankruptcy a day before the hearing but had previously attempted to build out channel 41 in Alexandria. Finding that Delta was a shell corporation unable to finance the purchase, the bankruptcy judge selected the Pollack-Belz offer in February 1988. The firm, consisting of William Pollack, his brother David, and his brother-in-law Marty Belz, promised to make the station competitive. It built a new tower for the station in Dry Prong, improving coverage.

William Pollack promised to restart local news on the station as part of the purchase. A month after Pollack-Belz took over, KLAX hired a news director, Max Tooker, who in previous posts had been successful at lifting the ratings of poorly-rated stations. The newscasts, titled Cenla 31 First News and Cenla 31 News Tonight, debuted at 5 and 10 p.m. in October 1988; Tooker departed three months later. By 1991, the station had gone through four news directors in the span of three years. Between 1994 and 1998, it was the ABC affiliate of record on cable systems in the Monroe area after that city's former ABC affiliate, KARD, became a Fox affiliate. The addition of the Monroe market to KLAX's viewing area increased its potential audience by more than 50 percent.

KLAX rebranded as 31LAX in 1996, including an overhaul of news presentation which included a more contemporary style oriented toward younger viewers and the replacement of three of the station's four evening news personalities. During this time, news ratings and revenue increased, but the station continued to lag Alexandria's long-established KALB-TV (channel 5). Catamount Broadcasting agreed to buy the station in 1999 but fell through. Full-length newscasts were scrapped on March 1, 2001, and replaced with short Action News Updates on weekdays only. In 2002, Pollack/Belz acquired "KCLA"—a low-power station that aired programming from UPN, America One, and Urban America Television—from Woody Jenkins. The deal gave KCLA cable carriage for the first time in its history. KLAX had previously been a secondary affiliate of UPN between 1995 and 2000.

On February 5, 2007, the Independent News Network (INN) of Davenport, Iowa, began to produce weeknight and Sunday evening newscasts for KLAX. Reporters in central Louisiana filed stories for the programs, which were presented by INN's anchors. Station management cited the outsourcing model as providing the cost-effectiveness necessary to restore a local news presence.

=== Northwest, Cox, Imagicomm, and Deltavision ownership ===
Pollack-Belz Communications agreed to sell KLAX-TV to a subsidiary of Northwest Broadcasting, for $3.5 million in 2018. This was the first of four sales of the station within seven years. Northwest's stations were acquired by Apollo Global Management in 2019 and combined with Cox Media Group. Although the group planned to do business as Terrier Media, it was later announced in June 2019 that Apollo would also acquire Cox's radio and advertising businesses and retain the Cox Media Group name. Cox sold KLAX-TV and 17 other stations to Imagicomm Communications, an affiliate of the parent company of the INSP cable channel, for $488 million in 2022; and Imagicomm sold KLAX-TV and other stations to Webb Collums's Deltavision Media in 2025.

== Subchannels ==
KLAX-TV is broadcast from a transmitter facility southwest of Dry Prong, Louisiana. The station's signal is multiplexed:

Subchannels of KLAX-TV
Subchannel	Res.	Short name	Programming
31.1	720p	KLAXABC	ABC
31.2	480i	METV	MeTV
31.3	480i	ION	Ion
