= WABG (AM) =

- Greenwood, Mississippi; United States
- Broadcast area: Mississippi Delta
- Frequency: 960 kHz
- Branding: The Awesome AM

Programming
- Format: Classic rock; Delta blues

Ownership
- Owner: SPB LLC

History
- First air date: February 26, 1950
- Former call signs: WJGJ (2004–2005)

Technical information
- Licensing authority: FCC
- Facility ID: 25238
- Class: B
- Power: 1,000 watts day; 500 watts night
- Transmitter coordinates: 33°33′18.4″N 90°12′20.3″W

Links
- Public license information: Public file; LMS
- Webcast: Listen live
- Website: www.awesomeam.com

WABG (960 kHz) is an American AM radio station broadcasting a Delta blues and classic rock format. Licensed to serve the community of Greenwood, Mississippi, United States, the station is owned by SPB LLC.

== History ==
WABG first signed-on the air on February 26, 1950. The station was owned by Bahakel Communications. WABG added its TV station when it first launched in 1959. The station was assigned call sign WJGJ on December 29, 2004. On May 10, 2005, the station changed its call sign back to WABG. Previously the station broadcast a talk radio format.

== License Renewal ==
The station's license has been renewed, despite several rules violations and false statements made by the station to the FCC. This includes an unauthorized 2015 ownership transfer, as well as failing several times to upload required reporting documents.

Former logo
