= WSYT =

Television station in Syracuse, New York

- Syracuse, New York; United States
- Channels: Digital: 14 (UHF); Virtual: 43, 68
- Branding: Fox 68; My 43

Programming
- Affiliations: 43.1: Independent with MyNetworkTV; 68.1: Fox; for others, see § Subchannels

Ownership
- Owner: Deltavision Media; (Syracuse License LLC)

History
- First air date: February 15, 1986
- Former call signs: WKAF (February–August 1986)
- Former channel numbers: Analog: 68 (UHF, 1986–2009); Digital: 19 (UHF, 2002–2019)
- Former affiliations: TBN (1986–1987)
- Call sign meaning: Syracuse Television

Technical information
- Licensing authority: FCC
- Facility ID: 40758
- ERP: 540 kW
- HAAT: 442.6 m (1,452 ft)
- Transmitter coordinates: 42°52′50.2″N 76°11′58.7″W
- Translator(s): WNYS-CD 16 Ithaca

Links
- Public license information: Public file; LMS
- Website: www.foxsyracuse.com

WSYT (channels 43 and 68) is a television station in Syracuse, New York, United States, affiliated with the Fox network and owned by Deltavision Media. The station's studios are located on James Street/NY 290 in Syracuse's Near Northeast section, and its transmitter is located near Otisco.

Channel 68 began broadcasting as WKAF on February 15, 1986. The completion of its transmitter facility capped nearly four years of instability. The group that initially attempted to construct the station, UPI Media, ran out of money and was forced to sell its equipment to Boston businessman Thomas Flatley for funding. For more than a year, the station aired religious programming for three hours a day on an interim basis. After Flatley exercised an option agreement, WKAF became WSYT and relaunched as a full-on Fox affiliate on April 5, 1987. The station raised its profile in the area by acquiring the rights to air Syracuse Orangemen basketball games.

Flatley exited broadcasting in 1990 and sold WSYT to Chuck McFadden. Under McFadden and Max Media ownership, WSYT debuted a 10 p.m. newscast produced by Syracuse NBC affiliate WSTM-TV. In 1996, it began operating WNYS-TV (channel 43) under a local marketing agreement. Sinclair Broadcast Group acquired WSYT in 1998, and two years later the station changed news providers to WTVH (channel 5), Syracuse's CBS affiliate. When WTVH pulled out of the arrangement in 2006, WSYT was left without local news programming. Sinclair sold WSYT to Brian Brady and eventually to his Northwest Broadcasting in 2013 when it acquired WSTM-TV. What had been WNYS-TV was merged onto this broadcast license in 2020 as a consequence of the merger of Northwest into Cox Media Group. WSYT has since been sold twice, to Imagicomm Communications in 2022 and Deltavision Media in 2025.

== History ==
=== Construction and early years ===
In 1979, the Great Onondaga County Telecasting Corporation, a California firm and subsidiary of National Health Enterprises, applied to the Federal Communications Commission (FCC) for permission to build a new TV station on channel 62 in Syracuse. Comark Television also applied for the permit, leading the FCC to designate the applications for comparative hearing in May 1981. Great Onondaga County was granted the permit on March 10, 1982. Later that year, National Health Enterprises—whose other line of business consisted of long-term care facilities—was acquired by National Medical Enterprises; the new owners did not want to pursue building TV stations, and sold the 70-percent stake to Douglas Ruhe, director of the United Press International news agency. In late 1983, UPI Media announced that the station would be on air at some point in mid-1984 as the market's first broadcast independent station. In 1984, with the consent of the WKAF permittee, the permit was changed to specify channel 68 as part of a chain reaction that added channel 63 to Newton, New Jersey; changed channel 63 at Kingston, New York, to channel 62; and changed channel 62 in Syracuse to channel 68.

UPI Media struggled to finance the venture, running out of money with the station halfway complete, and in January 1986 entered into a leaseback arrangement with Thomas Flatley, a Boston real estate businessman, for all of WKAF's equipment and an option to buy the station once it was put on the air and received its broadcast license. The station made it to air on a limited basis on February 15, 1986, airing programming from the Trinity Broadcasting Network for three hours a day. With the station complete and on the air, Flatley exercised his option to buy WKAF itself. Flatley completed the purchase on July 22, changed the call sign to WSYT (Syracuse Television) on August 20, and signed the station up for the new Fox network, which launched that October. WSYT had intended to debut its full program schedule that day but was not yet ready, nor did the station have a studio building. In November, Flatley acquired the building at 1000 James Street to use as its studio.

On April 5, 1987, in time for the debut of Fox's Sunday night lineup, WSYT launched its full local programming and brought an independent station to Syracuse, the only top-75 market still lacking one. In addition to Fox programming, WSYT offered movies, syndicated reruns, children's programs, and New York Yankees basketball. Later that year, it secured the rights to Syracuse Orangemen basketball, wresting the popular team's road game telecasts from WIXT. Syracuse basketball had been identified as a priority to raise the station's profile with advertisers and to get the station onto cable systems, some of which had not yet added channel 68 even though Flatley had paid for cable carriage in some areas.

Though WSYT lost money in its first two years, as was expected for a startup television station, its ratings share had steadily risen to 6 percent by February 1990. That month, Flatley—whose other station, WNHT in Concord, New Hampshire, shut down in March 1989—put WSYT on the market. It was sold to Encore Communications—owned by Chuck McFadden, a former vice president of TVX Broadcast Group and owner of WTVZ-TV in Norfolk, Virginia—for $7 million. McFadden had consulted for Flatley and became interested in buying WSYT. In 1994, Encore Communications became Max Television, which in turn was affiliated with Virginia Beach, Virginia–based Max Media Properties.

After taking over, McFadden announced he intended to launch a 10 p.m. local newscast in 1991. WSYT went as far as holding exploratory talks with WSTM-TV (channel 3), Syracuse's NBC affiliate, about providing anchors, reporters, and facilities to the proposed newscast. However, a poor economy prompted McFadden to put the idea on hold. On February 23, 1995, WSYT and WSTM-TV announced that the newscast, known as Fox 68 News at 10, would launch pursuant to a five-year agreement between the stations. WSYT sold advertising in the newscast and paid for production. The first edition of the newscast aired on June 26. It was designed to appeal to younger viewers of Fox programming with a fast pace, black-and-white graphics, and its own set.

In 1996, WSYT took over programming operations for WNYS-TV (channel 43), Syracuse's UPN affiliate. Syracuse sports moved to that station.

=== Sinclair ownership ===
Sinclair Broadcast Group acquired Max Media in a deal agreed in December 1997 and completed in July 1998.

Ratings and the quality of Fox 68 News at 10 were seen to stagnate under WSTM production. William LaRue, the TV critic for the Syracuse Herald-Journal, wrote that the newscast "keeps cutting its own throat" with poor story selection and a lack of resources. When the deal with WSTM ended in 2000, Sinclair signed with WTVH (channel 5), Syracuse's CBS affiliate, to replace it. Instead of featuring a separate anchor team, the new Fox 68 Eyewitness News at 10 featured WTVH anchors but had increased resources and aired seven nights a week, unlike the WSTM-produced newscast it replaced. Ratings for the WTVH-produced newscasts were initially higher than for the ones WSTM had produced. The partnership expanded in January 2005, when WTVH began producing Fox Eyewitness News at 7 a.m. for channel 68. The newscasts aired for nearly six years in total before WTVH opted to end the arrangement effective April 21, 2006, to focus on its own newscasts. The discontinuation came too soon to find a replacement partner or start an in-house news department.

=== Post-2013 ownership ===
In 2013, Sinclair acquired Barrington Broadcasting, owner of WSTM-TV. Under FCC rules of the time, Sinclair could not own two of the top four highest-rated TV stations in the market or three TV station licenses overall and announced it would sell WSYT, the local marketing agreement to operate WNYS-TV, and WYZZ-TV in Illinois. The Syracuse operation was sold to Brian Brady, former chair of the Fox affiliates association board, for $20 million. Brady owned the station through Bristlecone Broadcasting until 2015, when Brady restructured his holdings and moved it under Northwest Broadcasting. In 2018, Northwest acquired WNYS-TV outright.

Northwest Broadcasting was acquired in 2019 by Apollo Global Management, which merged it with Cox Media Group under the Cox Media Group name. As a condition of the acquisition, the WNYS-TV license was surrendered.

Cox Media Group sold WSYT and 17 other stations in 2022 to Imagicomm Communications, an affiliate of the parent company of the INSP cable channel, for $488 million. Imagicomm exited broadcasting in 2025, selling WSYT and four other stations to Webb Collums's Deltavision Media.

== Technical information ==
=== Subchannels ===
WSYT's transmitter facility is located near Otisco, New York. The station's signal is multiplexed:

Subchannels of WSYT
Subchannel	Res.	Short name	Programming
43.1	720p	MY43	Independent with MyNetworkTV
43.2	480i	Dabl	Dabl
68.1	720p	FOX68	Fox
68.2	480i	CoziTV	Cozi TV

WSYT was the first Syracuse station to broadcast in digital, beginning broadcasting on channel 19 on November 7, 2002. It ceased analog broadcasting on the original February 17, 2009, digital transition date and maintained its digital signal on channel 19. WSYT relocated its signal from channel 16 to channel 14 in 2019, as a result of the 2016 United States wireless spectrum auction.

=== Translator ===
WNYS-CD (channel 16) in Ithaca repeats WSYT.

The Ithaca translator was in service as early as May 1996.

== See also ==
- WFBN and WFYZ-TV, stations built by UPI Media that struggled financially
