= WNBD-LD =

Television station in Greenwood, Mississippi

- Greenwood–Greenville, Mississippi; United States
- City: Greenwood, Mississippi (Note: Originally licensed to Grenada, Mississippi; moved to Greenwood in 2022.)
- Channels: Digital: 33 (UHF); Virtual: 33
- Branding: NBC 33; The Delta News

Programming
- Affiliations: NBC

Ownership
- Owner: Deltavision Media; (Greenwood License LLC)
- Sister stations: WABG-TV, WXVT-LD

History
- Founded: February 25, 2010
- First air date: December 13, 2010
- Former call signs: W33CT-D (February–May 2010)
- Former affiliations: CBS (DT2, mapped to 15.1; 2016–2017)
- Call sign meaning: We're NBC for the Delta

Technical information
- Licensing authority: FCC
- Facility ID: 181137
- Class: LD
- ERP: 15 kW
- HAAT: 572.8 m (1,879 ft)
- Transmitter coordinates: 33°22′23.0″N 90°32′25.0″W

Links
- Public license information: LMS
- Website: www.deltanews.tv

WNBD-LD (channel 33) is a low-power television station licensed to Greenwood, Mississippi, United States, serving as the NBC affiliate for the Delta area. It is owned by Deltavision Media alongside dual ABC/Fox affiliate WABG-TV (channel 6) and low-power CBS affiliate WXVT-LD (channel 17). The three stations share studios on Washington Avenue in Greenville; WNBD-LD's transmitter is located northeast of Inverness, Mississippi.

WNBD-LD is the first NBC affiliate ever based in the market—before its launch, viewers in the region received NBC programming on cable or over-the-air from KTVE in El Dorado, Arkansas, WLBT in Jackson, and/or WMC-TV in Memphis, Tennessee. Soon after WNBD-LD's sign-on, it became available on Suddenlink Communications channel 9, with WLBT and WMC remaining in their channel positions. While current Federal Communications Commission (FCC) must-carry rules do not require carriage of low-powered stations, Commonwealth had the right to require cable systems to carry WNBD as part of retransmission consent compensation for carrying WABG.

== History ==
On August 25, 2009, Commonwealth Broadcasting Group, owner of WABG-TV, filed an application for a low-power television station on RF channel 33, originally licensed to Grenada, Mississippi. The application was granted by the Federal Communications Commission (FCC) on February 25, 2010; and the station was assigned the call sign W33CT-D. The call sign was changed to WNBD-LD on May 14, 2010. Tentative launch of the channel was scheduled for between mid-October and early November 2010. It applied for a "license to cover" on October 21. The station began broadcasting on December 13, 2010.

Commonwealth Broadcasting Group agreed to sell WNBD-LD, WABG-TV, and WFXW-LD to Cala Broadcast Partners for $11.7 million on October 30, 2015. Cala is jointly owned by Brian Brady (who owns several other television stations, mostly under the Northwest Broadcasting name) and Jason Wolff (who owns radio and television stations through Frontier Radio Management). Concurrently with this acquisition, Cala agreed to purchase WXVT from H3 Communications; a month later, it assigned its right to purchase that station to John Wagner. The sale was completed on August 1, 2016. on that date, the station went off the air, with Wagner stating in a filing with the FCC that it was looking for new programming. This resulted in the WXVT intellectual unit, including CBS programming, being moved to a digital subchannel of WNBD-LD, which was mapped to WXVT's former channel 15. The CBS affiliation remained on WNBD-LD until June 26, 2017, when it moved to the separate low-power channel 17 facility that became WXVT-LD.

On January 1, 2017, Cable One (now Sparklight) removed channels owned by Northwest Broadcasting after the two companies failed to reach an agreement. On February 1, 2017, the channels were restored to Cable One's lineup under a new carriage deal.

In February 2019, Reuters reported that Apollo Global Management had agreed to acquire the entirety of Brian Brady's television portfolio, which it intended to merge with Cox Media Group (which Apollo acquired at the same time) and stations spun off from Nexstar Media Group's purchase of Tribune Broadcasting, once the purchases are approved by the FCC. In March 2019 filings with the FCC, Apollo confirmed that its newly-formed broadcasting group, Terrier Media, would acquire Northwest Broadcasting, with Brian Brady holding an unspecified minority interest in Terrier. In June 2019, it was announced that Terrier Media would instead operate as Cox Media Group, as Apollo had reached a deal to also acquire Cox's radio and advertising businesses. The transaction was completed on December 17.

On February 2, 2022, the station changed its city of license to Greenwood.

On March 29, 2022, Cox Media Group announced it would sell WNBD-LD, WXVT-LD, WABG-TV and 15 other stations to Imagicomm Communications, an affiliate of the parent company of the INSP cable channel, for $488 million; the sale was completed on August 1. On April 8, 2025, Imagicomm announced that the Greenville stations would be acquired by Webb Collums' Deltavision Media; the deal was consummated on August 15.

== Subchannel ==
Subchannel of WNBD-LD
Channel	Res.	Short name	Programming
33.1	1080i	WNBD-LD	NBC
