= O'Reilly, Mississippi =

- Unincorporated community
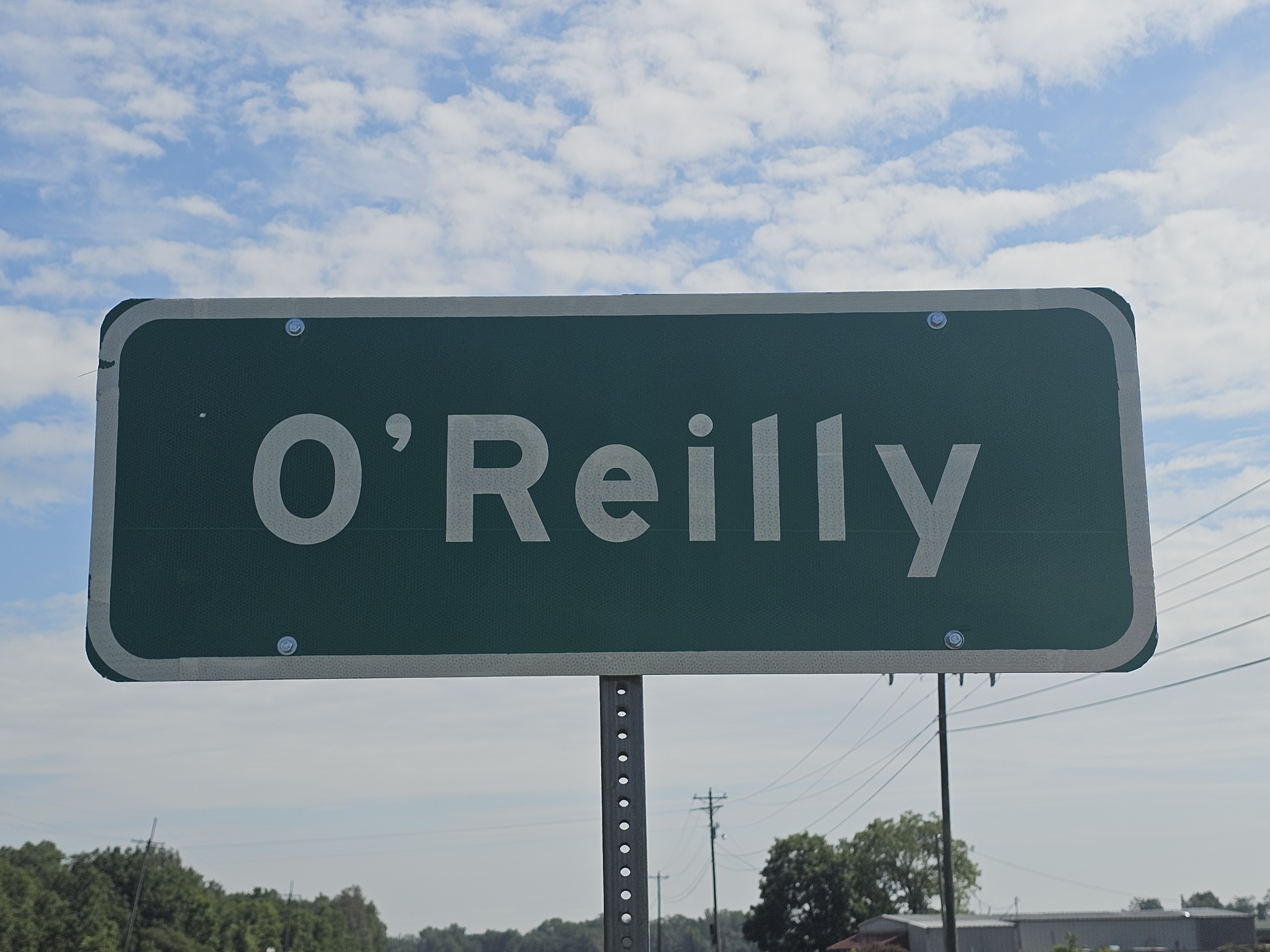
- Highway sign in O'Reilly

- Location within Mississippi Location within the United States
- Coordinates: 33°40′02″N 90°43′45″W
- Country: United States
- State: Mississippi
- County: Bolivar
- Elevation: 135 ft (41 m)
- Time zone: UTC-6 (Central (CST))
  - Summer (DST): UTC-5 (CDT)
- ZIP code: 38730
- Area code: 662
- GNIS feature ID: 692115

O'Reilly is an unincorporated community located in Bolivar County, Mississippi, United States, along U.S. Route 61. O'Reilly is approximately 3 miles (4.8 km) south of Boyle and approximately 6 miles (9.7 km) north of Shaw. O'Reilly is located on the former Yazoo and Mississippi Valley Railroad.

A post office operated under the name O'Reilly from 1903 to 1926.
