= WABG-TV =

Television station in Greenwood, Mississippi

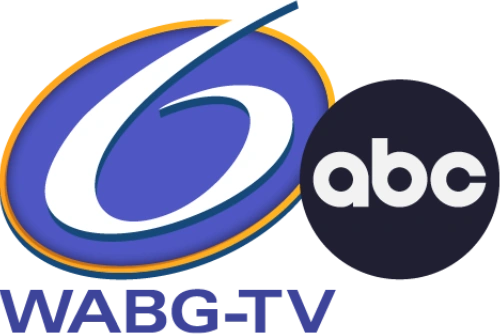

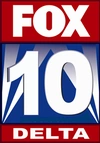
- Greenwood–Greenville, Mississippi; United States
- City: Greenwood, Mississippi
- Channels: Digital: 32 (UHF); Virtual: 6
- Branding: ABC 6; The Delta News; Delta Fox 10 (6.2)

Programming
- Affiliations: 6.1: ABC; 6.2: Fox

Ownership
- Owner: Deltavision Media; (Greenwood License LLC)
- Sister stations: WNBD-LD, WXVT-LD

History
- First air date: October 20, 1959
- Former channel numbers: Analog: 6 (VHF, 1959–2009)
- Former affiliations: CBS (1959–1966); ABC (secondary, 1959–1966)
- Call sign meaning: derived from WABG radio

Technical information
- Licensing authority: FCC
- Facility ID: 43203
- ERP: 1,000 kW
- HAAT: 572 m (1,877 ft)
- Transmitter coordinates: 33°22′23″N 90°32′25″W

Links
- Public license information: Public file; LMS
- Website: www.deltanews.tv

WABG-TV (channel 6) is a television station licensed to Greenwood, Mississippi, United States, serving the Delta area as an affiliate of ABC and Fox. It is owned by Deltavision Media alongside two low-power stations: NBC affiliate WNBD-LD (channel 33) and CBS affiliate WXVT-LD (channel 17). The three stations share studios on Washington Avenue in Greenville; WABG-TV's transmitter is located northeast of Inverness, Mississippi.

== History ==
WABG-TV began broadcasting on October 20, 1959, on VHF channel 6. It was originally affiliated with CBS, with ABC programming carried on a secondary basis. WABG became a full-time ABC affiliate in 1966.. That year, the station constructed a 1,200-foot (366 m) tower near Inverness and increased its effective radiated power to 100,000 watts. The tower was completed in October 1966. Until then, the only areas of the state to receive a sole ABC affiliate were the northwest (from Memphis' WHBQ-TV) and the Gulf Coast (from WVUE in New Orleans). Until future sister station WXVT signed on in 1980, WJTV in Jackson served as the default CBS affiliate for the southern counties in the Delta area, while WREG-TV in Memphis served the northern half of the market, Mississippi cities like Kosciusko received WABG-TV on their analog television set as their default ABC station from 1970 to 2009, as WAPT in Jackson did not have a strong signal on analog television in the Kosciusko area.

The station benefited from the Federal Communications Commission's post-1952 allocation of VHF television channels. Because the Greenwood–Greenville area was located between several larger television markets, the FCC allocated only one commercial VHF channel to the Delta. WABG received channel 6 and consequently became the area's only VHF commercial television station. WMAO-TV signed on in 1972 as a noncommercial educational station, while the market did not gain another commercial station until WXVT signed on in 1980.

Until WXVT's launch, CBS programming was primarily received by viewers in the southern portion of the Delta from WJTV in Jackson and in the northern portion from WREG-TV in Memphis. WABG's powerful analog signal also reached communities outside its immediate market, including portions of central Mississippi.

On March 11, 1986, WABG's Greenwood studios were damaged by a fire caused by an electrical short circuit after the station had signed off for the night. The damage was estimated at $5.5 million. No injuries were reported, and the station was forced to relocate its transmission operations.

On September 5, 2007, WABG announced that Bahakel Communications would sell the station to local businessman Charles Harker and his company, Commonwealth Broadcasting. The sale was completed on October 29, 2007.

In 2010, Commonwealth announced plans to launch WNBD-LD (channel 33), the Delta's first locally based NBC affiliate.; Before WNBD's launch, NBC programming was primarily available in the area through WMC-TV in Memphis and WLBT in Jackson, including on cable systems. Commonwealth also held the license for WFXW-LD (channel 17), originally intended as a separate low-power station.

On May 4, 2012, Saga Communications announced the sale of WXVT to H3 Communications, a company owned by the adult children of Charles Harker. On January 28, 2013, the FCC granted the sale of WXVT, and it was completed two days later. Commonwealth then took over WXVT's operations, effectively bringing all of the Delta's Big Three network stations under the control of one company.

In 2015, WABG and WXVT were featured in the truTV reality series Breaking Greenville, which followed the staff of the two competing Greenville news stations. The series premiered on January 29, 2015, and concluded on March 26, 2015.

On October 30, 2015, Commonwealth Broadcasting Group agreed to sell WABG-TV, WNBD-LD and WFXW-LD to Cala Broadcast Partners for $11.7 million. Cala was jointly owned by Brian Brady and Jason Wolff. Cala also agreed to acquire WXVT from H3 Communications, although the right to acquire that station was subsequently assigned to John Wagner. The transactions were completed on August 1, 2016.

In February 2019, Reuters reported that Apollo Global Management had agreed to acquire the entirety of Brian Brady's television portfolio, which it intended to merge with Cox Media Group (which Apollo acquired at the same time) and stations spun off from Nexstar Media Group's purchase of Tribune Broadcasting, once the purchases are approved by the FCC. In March, filings with the Federal Communications Commission confirmed that Apollo-backed Terrier Media would acquire Northwest Broadcasting, while a separate transaction would transfer control of Cox Enterprises' television stations to Terrier Media. Brian Brady was to retain a minority interest in the new company.. In June, Apollo announced that the combined company would operate under the Cox Media Group name after it also agreed to acquire Cox's radio and advertising businesses. The transactions closed on December 17, 2019, bringing Northwest Broadcasting's stations, including WABG-TV, into the expanded Cox Media Group.

On March 29, 2022, Cox Media Group announced that it would sell WABG-TV, WNBD-LD, WXVT-LD and other stations to Imagicomm Communications, an affiliate of the INSP cable channel, for $488 million; the sale was completed on August 1. On April 8, 2025, Imagicomm announced that the Greenville stations would be sold to Deltavision Media, a Mississippi-based broadcaster owned by Webb Collums. the deal was consummated on August 15.

== WABG-DT2 ==
WABG-DT2 is the Fox-affiliated second digital subchannel of WABG-TV, broadcasting in 720p high definition on virtual channel 6.2.

=== History ===
WABG-DT2's first logo.

On September 13, 2006, WABG launched a Fox affiliate on its second digital subchannel under the name Delta Fox 10. The launch followed the discontinuation of Foxnet, a cable-only service that had provided Fox programming to cable subscribers in the Mississippi Delta. The Delta was among the final U.S. markets to receive Foxnet. The service had originally been scheduled to shut down on September 1, 2006, but its shutdown was delayed until September 12 to give WABG additional time to launch its Fox service.

WABG-DT2 initially operated on a limited schedule because WABG did not have sufficient rights to syndicated programming. Delta Fox initially aired programming from 5:00 to 10:35 p.m. on weekdays, 4:00 to 10:30 p.m. on Saturdays, and 5:00 to 10:35 p.m. on Sundays outside of the football and NASCAR seasons. Fox Sports programming was carried regardless of the subchannel's normal operating hours. Because of its limited schedule, Delta Fox initially did not carry Fox's Saturday-morning children's programming block, 4Kids TV.

On October 26, 2009, Delta Fox expanded its schedule to approximately 20 hours of programming on weekdays and extended its weekend operating hours. The service subsequently expanded to a full-time schedule.

== Programming ==
Like many ABC affiliates in the rural South, WABG-TV did not initially air NYPD Blue when the series premiered in 1993. Mississippi ABC affiliates had been among the stations that declined to carry the program because of its adult content. WABG later began airing the series on January 3, 1995. In 1994, WABG was one of two ABC affiliates that declined to air the Roseanne episode "Don't Ask, Don't Tell", which featured a same-sex kiss between Roseanne Conner and a guest character played by Mariel Hemingway. Contemporary reporting stated that only two of ABC's approximately 225 affiliates declined to carry the episode.

== Newscasts ==
WABG-TV has consistently provided local newscasts and has held the title of the number-one-ranked station in the Delta region, even after the launch of WXVT. At that time, WABG-DT2, known as "Delta Fox 10", did not produce any local news content, even though there were plans to launch a newscast early in the station's existence. With the introduction of WNBD, additional newscasts were added, including an expansion of the weekday morning show to a full two hours, which was broadcast simultaneously on both channels. In October 2012, WNBD began airing its newscasts at 6:30 p.m., featuring talent from WABG and covering regional news. In 2014, WABG began airing its newscasts in high definition.

WABG-TV presently broadcasts approximately 14 hours and 25 minutes of locally produced newscasts each week (with 2 hours and 25 minutes each weekday and 30 minutes each on Saturdays and Sundays). In addition, channel 6 simulcasts select newscasts on WXVT-LD and WNBD-LD, while its Fox subchannel airs separate editions of The Delta News in the morning, at 5:30 p.m., and at 9 p.m. on weekdays. In 2019, WABG-TV began producing newscasts for sister station KLAX-TV in Alexandria, Louisiana.

== Technical information ==
=== Subchannels ===
The station's signal is multiplexed:

Subchannels of WABG-TV
Channel	Res.	Short name	Programming
6.1	720p	WABG-DT	ABC
6.2	720p	WABG-FX	Fox

=== Analog-to-digital conversion ===
WABG-TV shut down its analog signal, over VHF channel 6, on February 17, 2009, at 11:59 p.m., as part of the federally mandated transition from analog to digital television. The station's digital signal remained on its pre-transition UHF channel 32, using virtual channel 6.

== See also ==
- Channel 6 virtual TV stations in the United States
- Channel 10 branded TV stations in the United States
- Channel 32 digital TV stations in the United States
