= KSVI =

Television station in Billings, Montana

- Billings, Montana; United States
- Channels: Digital: 18 (UHF); Virtual: 6
- Branding: ABC 6; Billings CW (6.2)

Programming
- Affiliations: 6.1: ABC; 6.2: The CW Plus; for others, see § Subchannels

Ownership
- Owner: Nexstar Media Group; (Nexstar Media Inc.)
- Sister stations: KHMT

History
- First air date: January 8, 1993
- Former channel number: Analog: 6 (VHF, 1993–2009)
- Former affiliations: Both secondary: Fox (1994–1995); UPN (1995–2006)
- Call sign meaning: "VI" is the Roman numeral for 6

Technical information
- Licensing authority: FCC
- Facility ID: 5243
- ERP: 1,000 kW
- HAAT: 227.5 m (746 ft)
- Transmitter coordinates: 45°48′27″N 108°20′27.8″W
- Translator(s): see § Translators

Links
- Public license information: Public file; LMS
- Website: www.yourbigsky.com

KSVI (channel 6) is a television station in Billings, Montana, United States, affiliated with ABC and The CW. It is owned by Nexstar Media Group and operated alongside Fox affiliate KHMT (channel 4). The two stations share studios on South 24th Street West in Billings; KSVI's transmitter is located on Old Hardin Road east-northeast of the city.

Mid-Rivers Communications (based in Circle, Montana) carries KSVI on cable in Glendive, Montana (the smallest DMA in the U.S. according to Nielsen), as that market has no local ABC affiliate of its own.

KSVI's programming is relayed on translator station K25BP-D (channel 25) in Billings, in areas where KSVI's signal is poor. It can also be seen in Miles City on K16DH-D (channel 16), and in Howard on K32MN-D (channel 32).

== History ==
KSVI went on the air January 8, 1993, under the ownership of Big Horn Communications. Big Horn had previously signed on KOUS-TV (channel 4) in 1980. However, for most of its existence, KOUS was plagued by marginal reception in some parts of Billings, since its transmitter was located 18 miles (29 km) east of the city in order to ensure city-grade coverage of its city of license, Hardin. In hopes of getting better reception in Billings, Big Horn won a construction permit for channel 6 after the allocation was moved from Miles City.

KOUS signed off for the last time on January 8, and later that day the KOUS intellectual unit—including the ABC affiliation—moved to KSVI on channel 6. At the outset, channel 6's programming was also seen on KYUS-TV (channel 3) in Miles City and KCTZ (channel 7) in Bozeman, both of which had previously served as satellites of KOUS. KCTZ was sold to Cordillera Communications several months later to become a satellite of KXLF-TV in Butte (eventually becoming KBZK), while KYUS was sold to Stephen Marks in 1995 (originally proposed to become a satellite of KXGN-TV in Glendive, KYUS later simulcast KULR-TV from Billings). Following the sale of KCTZ, KSVI's programming was carried on translators K26DE (channel 26) in Bozeman and K43DU (channel 43) in Butte; this ended when KWYB signed on in 1996. Channel 6 also, at its sign-on, inherited Billings translator station K25BP, which was originally intended to improve KOUS' signal in Billings.

KSVI added a secondary affiliation with Fox in April 1994; this was primarily to carry the network's NFL coverage, but 15 hours a week of other Fox programs, such as Married... with Children and The Simpsons, were aired in overnight and weekend timeslots not programmed by ABC. Following this deal, cable systems in the Billings area removed Foxnet from their lineups. The secondary Fox affiliation ended when channel 4 returned to the air in August 1995 as Fox affiliate KHMT under a local marketing agreement with KSVI. Also in June 1995, channel 6 added a secondary affiliation with UPN (it had carried the first season of the network's Star Trek: Voyager on a standalone basis before signing as a formal secondary affiliate that June). this affiliation, which was eventually shared with KHMT, continued until UPN closed down in 2006.

Big Horn Communications sold KSVI to Great Trails Broadcasting Corporation for $17.37 million in 1997. The following year, Great Trails exited broadcasting and sold the station (and its LMA with KHMT), along with WHAG-TV in Hagerstown, Maryland, and WFFT-TV in Fort Wayne, Indiana, to Quorum Broadcasting Company for $65 million. Nexstar Broadcasting Group acquired Quorum for $230 million in December 2003.

== News operation ==
KSVI launched a news operation, shared with sister station KHMT, on April 18, 2002. After 18 months, the newscasts were canceled in September 2003, following Nexstar taking control of the stations in advance of its purchase of Quorum. Though the news operation had won Montana Broadcasters Association and Associated Press awards during its run, it was not successful in the ratings, as KSVI's newscasts trailed KTVQ (channel 2) and KULR-TV (channel 8) by a substantial margin. Nexstar said that shutting down the news operation was necessary to keep the stations profitable.

== Technical information ==
=== Subchannels ===
The station's signal is multiplexed:

Subchannels of KSVI
Subchannel	Res.	Short name	Programming
6.1	720p	KSVI-TV	ABC
6.2	720p	CW+	The CW Plus
6.3	480i	Mystery	Ion Mystery
6.4	480i	Antenna	Antenna TV (4:3)

=== Translators ===
- Billings: K25BP-D
- Bridger, etc.: K31LE-D
- Columbus: K33EA-D
- Colstrip: K07WJ-D, K24KM-D
- Emigrant: K23LW-D
- Hardin: K16DZ-D
- Harlowton–Shawmut: K07ZR-D
- Harlowton: K15JA-D
- Howard: K32MN-D
- Judith Gap: K04RT-D
- Martinsdale–Lennep: K09LW-D
- Miles City: K16DH-D
- Roundup: K07WP-D
- White Sulphur Springs: K11MP-D
