= WNYS-TV =

Television station in Syracuse, New York (1989–2020)

- Syracuse, New York; United States
- Channels: Digital: 44 (UHF); Virtual: 43
- Branding: My43

Programming
- Affiliations: Independent (1989–1995); UPN (1995–2001); The WB (2001–2006); MyNetworkTV (2006–2020)

Ownership
- Owner: Northwest Broadcasting; (Syracuse Broadcasting, Inc.)
- Sister stations: WSYT

History
- Founded: September 9, 1987
- First air date: October 26, 1989
- Last air date: January 14, 2020; (30 years, 80 days)
- Former call signs: WSNR-TV (1989–1994); WNYS-TV (1994–2020)
- Former channel numbers: Analog: 43 (UHF, 1989–2009)
- Call sign meaning: New York Syracuse

Technical information
- Facility ID: 58725
- ERP: 680 kW
- HAAT: 445 m (1,460 ft)
- Transmitter coordinates: 42°52′50.2″N 76°11′58.7″W

WNYS-TV (channel 43) was a television station in Syracuse, New York, United States, which operated from 1989 to 2020. In its latter years, it was owned by Northwest Broadcasting as an affiliate of MyNetworkTV; it had common ownership with Fox affiliate WSYT (channel 68). WNYS-TV's operations were housed at WSYT's studio facilities on James Street/NY 290 in Syracuse's Near Northeast section; the station's transmitter was located near Maple Grove, a hamlet of Otisco, New York.

WNYS-TV went off the air on January 14, 2020, ahead of the surrender of its license as a condition of Apollo Global Management's 2019 acquisition of Northwest Broadcasting. At that time, the station's programming continued as subchannels of WSYT, continuing to use virtual channel 43. What was WNYS-TV's primary subchannel continues under the WSYT license as "My 43".

== History ==
=== As an independent station ===
The station began broadcasting in October 1989 as an independent with the call sign WSNR-TV. Its call letters were changed in 1994 to WNYS-TV. This had been previously used on what is now ABC affiliate WSYR-TV (channel 9) from 1962 until 1978.

=== UPN affiliation; transition to The WB ===
On January 16, 1995, WNYS-TV became a charter affiliate of UPN. In that same year, Max Media Properties (then owner of WSYT) entered into an LMA with WNYS-TV and began operating the station out of that outlet's facility. It switched to The WB in January 2001 after which UPN was picked up ten months later on October 20 by low-power WAWA-LP (later WSTQ-LP). That station, however, would not be available on Time Warner Cable in Syracuse until July 2003, as cable companies are not obligated to carry low-power stations under Federal Communications Commission (FCC) regulations. As a result, between June 2001 and July 2003, Boston superstation WSBK-TV served as the UPN affiliate for Syracuse Time Warner Cable subscribers.

=== MyNetworkTV affiliation ===
On September 5, 2006, WNYS-TV affiliated with its third network in the last twelve years becoming a MyNetworkTV affiliate. Along with other Sinclair stations in New York State, WNYS-TV and WSYT have been transmitting digital-only signals since February 17, 2009. Sinclair announced the sale of WSYT, the LMA for WNYS-TV, and WYZZ-TV in Peoria–Bloomington, Illinois, to Cunningham Broadcasting on February 28, 2013, following its acquisition of Barrington Broadcasting. The sale was necessary due to the FCC's ownership rules as Sinclair chose to keep Barrington's WSTM-TV (channel 3) in Syracuse.

However, in an updated filing with the FCC, it was revealed that WSYT would instead be sold to Bristlecone Broadcasting, a company owned by Brian Brady (owner of Northwest Broadcasting) whose only other assets in New York State were WICZ-TV and WBPN-LP in Binghamton. Those transactions were completed on November 25.

Following the consummation of the sale, Sinclair continued to operate WSYT and WNYS-TV through a transitional service agreement for six months until May 2014. Sinclair will continue to own the station's studios on James Street and its transmitter site in Otisco for at least ten years. WNYS-TV previously maintained its own website but as a result of the sale to Bristlecone, this was abandoned in favor of a shared website with WSYT. In late-January 2015, its second digital subchannel began carrying GetTV, a Sony Pictures Entertainment-owned digital off-air broadcast channel providing mostly classic films from the Sony library.

Bristlecone Broadcasting was incorporated into the Northwest Broadcasting corporate structure in a May 2015 restructuring of Brian Brady's broadcast holdings. On November 20, 2015, the WNYS-TV license was sold by RKM Media to Syracuse Broadcasting. The sale originated in 2005 as an attempt by Sinclair to buy WNYS outright for $3.1 million; the rights to acquire the station were transferred to Bristlecone as part of its purchase of WSYT, and were in turn sold to Syracuse Broadcasting for $250,000 on August 10, 2015. On October 1, 2018, Northwest acquired WNYS outright for $100,000. The sale was completed on December 6.

=== Surrender of license; move to WSYT's spectrum ===
As part of Apollo Global Management's purchase of Northwest, the company would have had to sell one of their two television stations in the market or shut one of them down, as a federal appeals court ruled that Apollo could not own both stations. After the sale was completed, it was decided to migrate the intellectual unit and programming of WNYS-TV to a digital subchannel of WSYT. WNYS-TV's license was then surrendered on January 21, 2020.

== Technical information ==
=== Subchannels ===
As mentioned above, the station shares WSYT's bandwidth and is officially recognized as a WSYT subchannel (if going by actual physical channel without virtual channel intervention, channel 43's two subchannels are 14.5 and 14.6), but retains its own multiplexed channel map as channel 43:

Subchannel	Res.	Short name	Programming
43.1	720p	MY43	MyNetworkTV
43.2	480i	Dabl	Dabl

=== Analog-to-digital conversion ===
WNYS-TV shut down its analog signal, over UHF channel 43, on February 17, 2009, the original target date on which full-power television stations in the United States were to transition from analog to digital broadcasts under federal mandate (which was later pushed back to June 12, 2009). The station's digital signal remained on its pre-transition UHF channel 44, using virtual channel 43.
