= WCIX =

Television station in Springfield, Illinois

- Springfield–Decatur–; Champaign–Urbana, Illinois; United States
- City: Springfield, Illinois
- Channels: Digital: 11 (VHF); Virtual: 49
- Branding: X 49 (general); WCIA 3 News; WCIA 3 (49.2)

Programming
- Affiliations: 49.1: Independent with MyNetworkTV; 49.2: CBS; for others, see § Subchannels

Ownership
- Owner: Nexstar Media Group; (Nexstar Media Inc.)
- Sister stations: WCIA

History
- First air date: 1967 (current license dates from February 4, 1985)
- Former call signs: W49AA (1967–1985); WCFN (1985–2011)
- Former channel numbers: Analog: 49 (UHF, 1967–2009); Digital: 53 (UHF, 2002–2009), 13 (VHF, 2009–2020)
- Former affiliations: CBS (as satellite of WCIA, 1967–2002); UPN (2002–2006)
- Call sign meaning: disambiguation from WCIA

Technical information
- Licensing authority: FCC
- Facility ID: 42116
- ERP: 5 kW; 8.5 kW (CP)
- HAAT: 175.5 m (576 ft)
- Transmitter coordinates: 39°47′27.4″N 89°30′53″W
- Translator(s): WCIA 3.2 Champaign

Links
- Public license information: Public file; LMS
- Website: www.wcia.com

WCIX (channel 49) is a television station licensed to Springfield, Illinois, United States, serving the Central Illinois region. It is programmed primarily as an independent station, but maintains a secondary affiliation with MyNetworkTV. WCIX is owned by Nexstar Media Group alongside Champaign-licensed CBS affiliate WCIA (channel 3). The two stations share studios on South Neil Street/US 45 in downtown Champaign and also operate a sales office and news bureau on West Edwards Street near the Illinois State Capitol in Springfield. WCIX's transmitter is located in Clear Lake Township.

Since WCIX's over-the-air signal cannot be seen in eastern parts of the market (including Champaign, Urbana, and Danville), it is simulcast in high definition on WCIA's second digital subchannel (3.2) from a transmitter west of Seymour, Illinois. Nielsen Media Research treats WCIX and WCIA-DT2 as one station in local ratings books, using the identifier name WCIX+.

== History ==
Before WCIA signed-on in 1953, it originally wanted to build its transmitter tower in White Heath, halfway between Champaign and Decatur. The tower would have been placed on some of the highest ground in Central Illinois. However, after construction began, then-ABC affiliate WTVP (channel 17, now WAND) filed an objection. Even though it was obvious that Champaign–Urbana and Springfield/Decatur would be considered a single market, WTVP owner Prairie Television claimed WCIA was trying to encroach on its territory. To avoid delays, that station moved its transmitter to its current location in Seymour. While the signal from the Seymour tower covered Decatur very well, it was barely viewable in Springfield until cable television arrived in the market in the early 1960s.

WCIA quickly established itself as the dominant station in the region despite its signal issues in the western half of the market. Eventually, then-owner Midwest Television decided to open a low-powered satellite relay of WCIA on UHF channel 49 to get better coverage in Springfield and the surrounding area. This relay launched in 1967 under the callsign W49AA. On February 4, 1985, Midwest Television upgraded channel 49 to a full-power station under new calls, WCFN (standing for its channel number). However, like its low-powered predecessor, WCFN was a straight simulcast of WCIA, even airing its commercials. WCFN's existence was only acknowledged in WCIA's legal station identifications.

In 2002, WCFN broke off from the simulcast to be the market's first full-time UPN affiliate. That network had previously been seen in off-hours on Pax outlet WPXU (channel 23, now WBUI) in Decatur. However, few viewers actually lost access to WCIA, given the extremely high penetration of cable and satellite in central Illinois.

The removal of CBS service from the station would be temporary with the launch of WCFN's digital transmitter, meaning that despite the conversion to UPN, WCFN's schedule could also air as a WCIA subchannel, with WCIA's main CBS channel able to be carried by WCFN. Accordingly, the main channel 49 schedule was added to WCIA-DT2 with channel 3's schedule airing on WCFN-DT2. WCIA's signal aired in full 1080i high definition, with the main WCFN schedule only seen in a reduced 480i standard definition over-the-air on both channels 49.1 and 3.2 as multiplexing of two high-definition signals was not yet possible. In September 2006, with ACME Communications's WBUI (then with executive connections with a former WB network executive) de facto taking The CW affiliation by default, WCFN joined MyNetworkTV instead in the wake of the WB/UPN merger.

In early 2007, Nexstar and the Illinois High School Association came to an agreement to carry coverage of IHSA tournaments in the market on channel 49. Central Illinois had previously been without an over-the-air flagship station for these kind of events. Also, from 2010 to 2019, the station carried Chicago Bulls, Cubs, and White Sox games which aired in Chicago on WCIU and WLS-TV and were produced by WGN Sports. The station carried Indianapolis Colts preseason football games starting in 2011. Before 2011, WCFN featured Labor Day coverage of the US Open tennis tournament from CBS because of WCIA's commitment to air the Jerry Lewis MDA Labor Day Telethon. In 2011, the tennis coverage shifted fully to WCIA since the telethon was limited to the night before Labor Day.

On August 29, 2011, the station's call sign was changed to WCIX—a call sign used on CBS owned-and-operated station WFOR-TV in Miami, Florida from 1967 to 1995, when that station changed from channel 6 to channel 4 and swapped with NBC's WTVJ. At that point, the station's logo was changed to resemble that of sister station KARZ-TV in Little Rock, Arkansas; which is also a MyNetworkTV affiliate associated with a big three network-affiliated station (in that case, NBC outlet KARK-TV).

In June 2015, Nexstar upgraded the transmitters of WCIA and WCIX to allow high definition multiplexing, so WCIX's main MyNetworkTV channel began to be carried on both stations in full 1080i 16:9 on both 49.1 and 3.2.

On December 3, 2018, Nexstar announced it would acquire the assets of Chicago-based Tribune Media for $6.4 billion in cash and debt. The deal—which would make Nexstar the largest television station operator by total number of stations upon its expected closure late in the third quarter of 2019—resulted in WCIX and WCIA gaining additional sister stations in nearby markets including Chicago (independent station WGN-TV) and St. Louis (Fox affiliate KTVI and CW affiliate KPLR-TV). (Ownership conflicts existed in two existing Nexstar markets involving Nexstar's duopoly of CW affiliate WISH-TV and MyNetworkTV affiliate WNDY-TV (which were both sold to Circle City Broadcasting) and Tribune's duopoly of Fox affiliate WXIN and CBS affiliate WTTV/WTTK in Indianapolis and Nexstar's virtual triopoly of CBS affiliate WHBF-TV, CW affiliate KGCW and Fox-affiliated SSA partner KLJB and Tribune-owned ABC affiliate WQAD-TV (which was sold to Tegna) in the Quad Cities.) The sale was approved by the FCC on September 16 and was completed on September 19, 2019.

== News operation ==
On April 7, 2005, WCIA began airing the market's first prime time newscast on WCFN. Known on-air as Primetime News at 9, the broadcast originated from the main studios in Champaign but was targeted specifically at a Springfield-based audience. The name was altered to myCFN News at 9 in September 2006 to reflect WCFN's affiliation change to MyNetworkTV.

There would not be any competition in the time slot until September 11, 2006, when rival ABC affiliates WICS/WICD began co-producing a nightly prime time newscast at 9 on Fox affiliates WRSP/WCCU. That program was based out of WICS' Springfield studios but, unlike WCFN's show, featured market-wide coverage (including contributions from WICD reporters based in Champaign). However, there was a separate weeknight weather forecast segment seen on WRSP and WCCU that was specifically geared towards the Springfield and Champaign areas, respectively.

Also in 2006, WCIA began airing an hour-long extension of its weekday morning newscast at 7 a.m. on WCFN. This originally included a simulcast of the 6 o'clock hour of The Morning Show from WCIA. At the end of the first hour, viewers were always reminded to flip the channel to WCFN which offers a local alternative to the national morning programs seen on the big three networks. In 2007, another hour was added to the show which can now be seen from 7 until 9.

In 2009, WCIA announced it would cancel myCFN News at 9 and launch a new sixty-minute newscast weeknights at 7 on WCFN beginning September 28. As a result, MyNetworkTV programming now airs out-of-pattern, via an hour tape delay, from 8 to 10 p.m. The broadcast would eventually be reduced to 30 minutes in length. On October 24, 2012, WCIA upgraded local news production to high definition level. However, WCIX's newscasts were initially seen over-the-air in a letterboxed format because its main channel only transmitted in 4:3 standard definition until it was upgraded to full HD in 2015. WRSP/WCCU added competition to the weekday morning news race on January 20, 2014, after WICS began producing a two-hour extension of its morning show on the Fox affiliates. In addition to WCIA's main facilities, it operates bureaus in Springfield (on West Edwards Street near the Illinois State Capitol) and Decatur (on North Water Street).

In September 2017, the station moved its newscast from 7 to 9 p.m.

== Technical information ==
=== Subchannels ===
WCIX and WCIA broadcast two shared channels (MyNetworkTV on 49.1 and 3.2 and CBS on 49.2 and 3.1) and two unique diginets each. Also broadcast on the WCIX multiplex is a subchannel of WRSP-TV as part of the market's ATSC 3.0 (NextGen TV) hosting arrangement.

Subchannels of WCIX
Channel	Res.	Short name	Programming
49.1	1080i	WCIX-HD	Main WCIX programming
49.2	1080i	WCIA-HD	CBS (WCIA)
49.3	480i	Mystery	Ion Mystery
49.4	480i	Laff	Laff
55.2	480i	TrueCri	True Crime Network (WRSP-TV)

Simulcast of subchannels of another station
Broadcast on behalf of another station

WCIX-DT1 and WCIA-DT2 both broadcast in 1080i, upscaled from MyNetworkTV's default 720p format.

=== Analog-to-digital conversion ===
WCIX (as WCFN) shut down its analog signal, over UHF channel 49, on June 12, 2009, the official date on which full-power television stations in the United States transitioned from analog to digital broadcasts under federal mandate. The station's digital signal relocated from its pre-transition UHF channel 53, which was among the high band UHF channels (52-69) that were removed from broadcasting use as a result of the transition, to VHF channel 13, using virtual channel 49.
