= ABC Springfield =

ABC Springfield may refer to:

- WGGB-TV (Springfield, Massachusetts)
- WICS (Springfield, Illinois)
- KYTV (TV station) (Springfield, Missouri)
