= Fox 55 =

Fox 55 may refer to one of the following television stations in the United States affiliated with the Fox Broadcasting Company:

- WFFT-TV in Fort Wayne, Indiana
- WRSP-TV in Springfield, Illinois
