= WBUI =

Television station in Decatur, Illinois

- Decatur–Springfield–; Champaign–Urbana, Illinois; United States
- City: Decatur, Illinois
- Channels: Digital: 22 (UHF); Virtual: 23
- Branding: CW 23 (general); NewsChannel 20 Sunrise (morning newscasts); Fox Champaign News (9 p.m. newscasts)

Programming
- Affiliations: 23.1: The CW; for others, see § Subchannels

Ownership
- Owner: GOCOM Media, LLC; (GOCOM Media of Illinois, LLC)
- Operator: Standard Media
- Sister stations: WRSP/WCCU; WICS; WICD

History
- Founded: December 28, 1983
- First air date: May 14, 1984
- Former call signs: WFHL (1984–1998); WPXU (1998–1999)
- Former channel numbers: Analog: 23 (UHF, 1984–2009)
- Former affiliations: Religious Independent (1984–1998); Pax (1998–1999); The WB (1999–2006); UPN (secondary, 1998–2002)
- Call sign meaning: The WB (former affiliation) and University of Illinois (allusion of service to Champaign–Urbana)

Technical information
- Licensing authority: FCC
- Facility ID: 16363
- ERP: 325 kW
- HAAT: 401 m (1,316 ft)
- Transmitter coordinates: 39°56′56″N 88°50′12″W

Links
- Public license information: Public file; LMS
- Website: foxillinois.com

WBUI (channel 23) is a television station licensed to Decatur, Illinois, United States, serving the Central Illinois region as an affiliate of The CW. It is owned by GOCOM Media, LLC, alongside Springfield-licensed Fox affiliate WRSP-TV, channel 55 (and its semi-satellite, Urbana-licensed WCCU, channel 27), and is operated by Standard Media, owner of Springfield-licensed ABC affiliate WICS, channel 20 (and its semi-satellite, Champaign-licensed WICD, channel 15). WBUI, WRSP and WICS share studios on East Cook Street in Springfield's Eastside; WBUI maintains an advertising sales office on East William Street in downtown Decatur and transmitter facilities in Whitmore Township (between Oreana and I-72).

== History ==
The station signed on May 14, 1984, as WFHL and was owned by the local Foursquare Church. One half of the station's programming was Christian programming with shows such as The 700 Club and local religious programs. The station's original studios were located on North Parkway Court in Decatur. The other half of the schedule consisted of recent barter cartoons, some older cartoons, family-oriented off-network drama shows, classic sitcoms, westerns, and old movies.

In 1998, the station was sold to Paxson Communications, who renamed the station WPXU. The station replaced most hours of programming with infomercials until it joined the company's Pax TV network at its launch on August 31, 1998. At that point, the syndicated shows aired by previous ownership were dropped entirely. On October 5, WPXU added a secondary affiliation with UPN as did several other Paxson-owned stations.

ACME Communications acquired the station from Paxson on June 2, 1999, and changed it to WB affiliate WBUI. (Paxson, now Ion Media Networks, promptly moved the WPXU-TV call letters to its station in Jacksonville, North Carolina). At this point, some of the syndicated shows previously airing on the station returned along with mix of classic sitcoms and cartoons. Even after the sale, the station retained its secondary UPN affiliation with ACME expanding the arrangement to KPLR-TV in St. Louis and WBXX-TV in Knoxville by 2000.

When WCFN (now WCIX) joined UPN in 2002, WBUI became a sole WB affiliate. Gradually from about 2000 until 2005, the station phased out most cartoons and classic sitcoms for more recent sitcoms, talk shows, and court shows. In September 2006 with the merge between UPN and The WB, WBUI (owned by a former WB network executive) took The CW affiliation by default while WCFN joined the other new broadcast television network, MyNetworkTV. On June 20, 2007, GOCOM Media announced its intent to purchase this station from ACME Communications. The sale was approved on September 14 by the Federal Communications Commission (FCC) which waived its duopoly rules for the sale.

The Central Illinois market did not have enough station owners at the time to legally permit another duopoly under normal conditions (there was already an existing duopoly in the market, Nexstar Broadcasting's WCIA and WCFN). However, ACME and GOCOM sought a "failed station" waiver for the deal. ACME claimed it was losing money on WBUI and could not find a buyer that did not require a duopoly waiver. The sale to GOCOM Media officially closed on October 25, 2007. At that point, the station moved its operations from its original studios at North Parkway Court in Decatur into WRSP's facilities on Old Rochester Road in Springfield.

On December 31, 2012, the Sinclair Broadcast Group closed on the purchase of the non-license assets of GOCOM's three television stations (WRSP/WCCU and sister station WBUI) for approximately $25.6 million. Sinclair provides sales and other non-programming services to the stations pursuant to shared services and joint sales agreements. Both WBUI and WRSP were initially operated from separate facilities from WICS/WICD. However, WCCU quickly moved its advertising sales operation from its location on South Neil Street/US 45 in Champaign into WICD's studios. Eventually, WRSP and WBUI also moved from their offices in Springfield and were consolidated into WICS' facility.

Through a previous arrangement with WICS, the ABC outlet's weekday morning meteorologist provided WBUI with weather forecasts seen on-air (during its airing of The Daily Buzz) and through its website that were taped in advance. The segments were appropriately titled C-More Weather (owing to its CW affiliation). WBUI no longer offers The Daily Buzz as part of its schedule.

== Technical information ==
=== Subchannels ===
The station's signal is multiplexed:

Subchannels of WBUI
Subchannel	Res.	Short name	Programming
23.1	1080i	CW	The CW
23.2	480i	Dabl	Dabl
23.3	480i	TheNest	The Nest
23.4	480i	Rewind	Rewind TV
27.3	480i	Antenna	Antenna TV (WCCU)

Broadcast on behalf of another station

=== Analog-to-digital conversion ===
WBUI shut down its analog signal, over UHF channel 23, on February 17, 2009, the original target date on which full-power television stations in the United States were to transition from analog to digital broadcasts under federal mandate (which was later pushed back to June 12, 2009). The station's digital signal remained on its pre-transition UHF channel 22, using virtual channel 23.

=== Towers ===
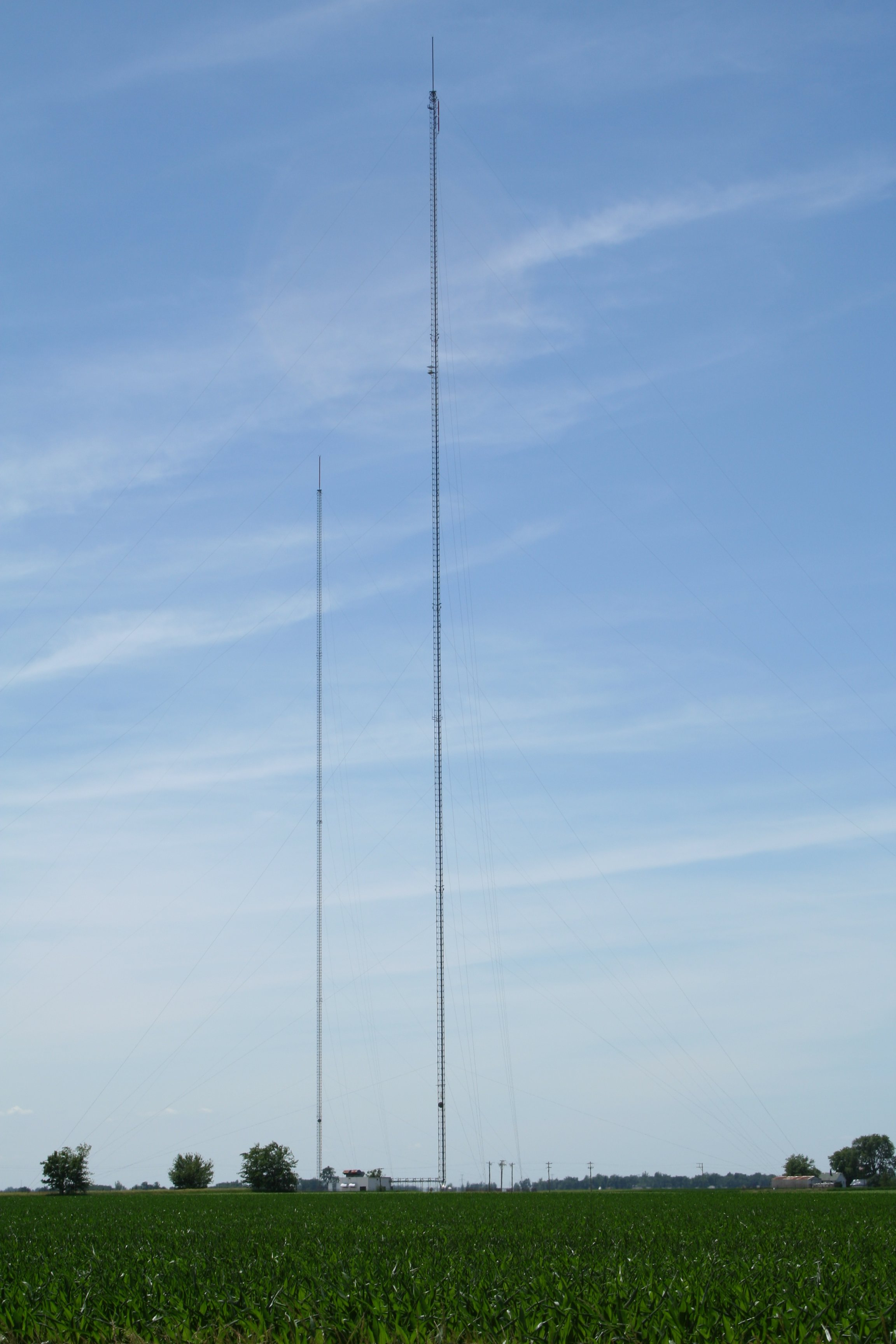
The 411.8-meter (1,351.0 ft) tall WBUI tower (left tower) near Argenta, Illinois, 2007.

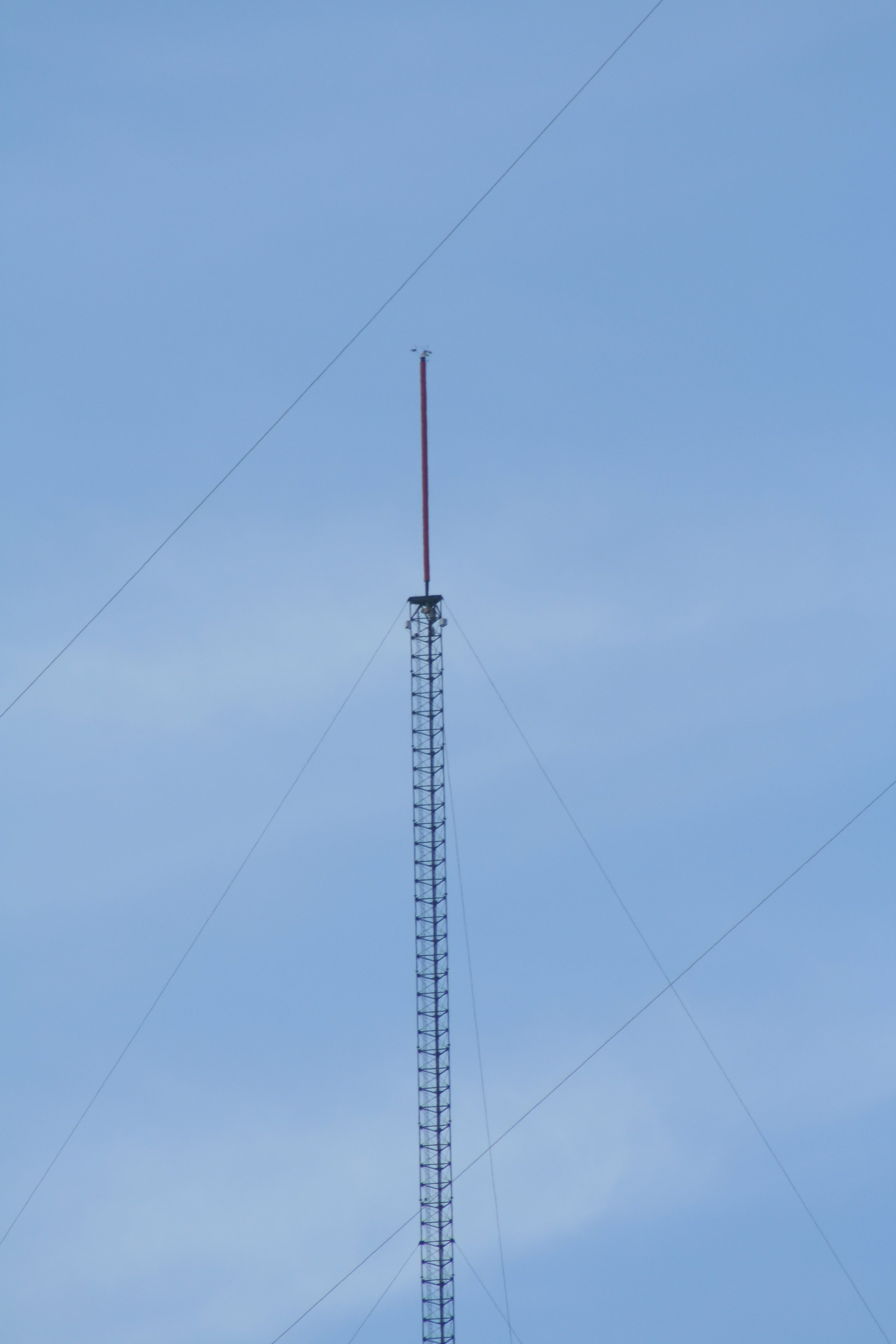
The upper portion of the WBUI-TV tower, 2007.
