= WCIA =

Television station in Champaign, Illinois

- Champaign–Urbana–; Springfield–Decatur, Illinois; United States
- City: Champaign, Illinois
- Channels: Digital: 34 (UHF); Virtual: 3
- Branding: WCIA 3 (general); WCIA 3 News (newscasts); X 49 (3.2)

Programming
- Affiliations: 3.1: CBS; 3.2: MyNetworkTV; for others, see § Subchannels

Ownership
- Owner: Nexstar Media Group; (Nexstar Media Inc.)
- Sister stations: WCIX

History
- First air date: November 14, 1953
- Former channel numbers: Analog: 3 (VHF, 1953–2009); Digital: 48 (UHF, 2002–2020)
- Former affiliations: All secondary: ABC (1953–1954); DuMont (1953–1956); NBC (1953–1959)
- Call sign meaning: Central Illinois Area

Technical information
- Licensing authority: FCC
- Facility ID: 42124
- ERP: 681 kW
- HAAT: 285.1 m (935 ft)
- Transmitter coordinates: 40°6′21″N 88°27′0″W
- Translator(s): WCIX 49.2 Springfield

Links
- Public license information: Public file; LMS
- Website: www.wcia.com

WCIA (channel 3) is a television station licensed to Champaign, Illinois, United States, serving as the CBS affiliate for the Central Illinois region. It is owned by Nexstar Media Group alongside Springfield-licensed WCIX (channel 49), an independent station with MyNetworkTV. Both stations share studios on South Neil Street/US 45 in downtown Champaign and also operate a sales office and news bureau on West Edwards Street near the Illinois State Capitol in Springfield. WCIA's transmitter is located west of Seymour, Illinois.

Since WCIA's over-the-air signal is marginal to nonexistent in western parts of the market (including Springfield and Jacksonville), it is simulcast in high definition on WCIX's second digital subchannel (49.2) from a transmitter in Clear Lake Township. Nielsen Media Research treats WCIA and WCIX-DT2 as one station in local ratings books, using the identifier name WCIA+.

== History ==
WCIA made its first broadcast on November 14, 1953. It was owned and operated by Champaign-based Midwest Television, headed by August C. Meyer Sr., a lawyer and chairman of the board of the Champaign-based Bank of Illinois. Meyer founded Midwest Television in 1952, and expanded the company's footprint by buying WMBD-AM–FM–TV in Peoria, Illinois, in 1960 and KFMB-AM–FM–TV in San Diego, California, in 1964. Midwest sold off controlling interest in its Illinois television holdings to Nexstar in 1999. That company acquired Midwest's remaining interest in the Illinois stations in 2001.

WCIA was a primary CBS affiliate, carrying secondary affiliations with NBC and DuMont. DuMont shut down in 1956 and WCIA dropped NBC in 1959 when WCHU-TV (now WICD) started. It also carried a few ABC shows during the 1953–1954 television season.

As the only commercial VHF station in Central Illinois, WCIA has been one of the country's most dominant television stations for most of its history. On two occasions, it fought off attempts by WICS/WICD and WAND to force it onto the UHF band by claiming that moving to UHF would cause it to lose 150,000 viewers.

Despite its dominance of the market, WCIA provides only a Grade B signal to the Springfield area even in digital. Meyer realized early on that Champaign–Urbana and Springfield/Decatur were going to be one giant television market. He originally wanted to build WCIA's tower in White Heath, roughly halfway between Champaign and Decatur. The tower would have been placed on some of the highest ground in Central Illinois. However, just after construction began, Prairie Television (owner of WTVP, now WAND) filed an objection. Prairie claimed WCIA was encroaching on its territory. To avoid delays, WCIA moved its transmitter to the current location in Seymour. Despite this, Decatur (the second-largest city in the western half of the market) receives WCIA's signal very well.

Although most of Springfield did not get a clear signal from channel 3 until cable arrived in central Illinois, WCIA frequently trounced WICS/WICD and WAND in the ratings. In 1967, Meyer decided to open a low-powered relay of WCIA on UHF channel 49 to get better coverage in the state capital. In 1985, the repeater became full-powered station WCFN, but remained a straight simulcast of WCIA; its existence was only acknowledged in legal IDs. In 2002, WCFN separated from WCIA and became the area's UPN affiliate. However, few viewers on the western half of the market lost access to WCIA due to the extremely high penetration of cable and satellite, which is all but essential for acceptable television in much of this vast market. The few viewers who lost access regained it soon afterward when WCIA and WCFN activated their digital signals and added each other to their second digital subchannels. WCFN's main channel instead carried WCIA's main schedule in full high definition, with WCFN's channel remaining in standard definition until multiplexing technology improved to allow WCIA and WCFN's main channels to both be in HD. This, and area cable and satellite access, assured both stations full market coverage. WCFN changed its call letters to WCIX in 2011.

For decades, WCIA was available on cable systems in Bloomington–Normal, in the Peoria market, along with sister station WMBD-TV. In March 2000, shortly after Nexstar bought controlling interest in both stations, it announced it would drop WCIA from AT&T Broadband (now Comcast Xfinity) and cable systems in surrounding areas, a move that would eventually be forced nationwide, due to CBS affiliation agreements requiring only one affiliate being authorized per market on pay television services. It would centralize WMBD's advertising revenue and preserve its ratings standing within the Peoria market without numbers being further stunted by WCIA. A group known as "Citizens to Keep WCIA on-the-air" petitioned Nexstar to revert the change, but was unsuccessful. WCIA's Grade B signal still covers the Bloomington–Normal area decently (extending as far west as Morton), meaning that Bloomington–Normal residents can still receive WCIA over-the-air.

In November 2006, work began to re-secure WCIA's existing tower in Seymour so it would be able to hold a new digital transmission line and antenna.

WCIA was the longtime home to Illinois Fighting Illini football and men's basketball games that were not aired on national television. Originally produced by WCIA, the station later carried the Illini via the Big Ten Conference's syndicated package with ESPN Plus. Beginning in 2007, these games have since moved to the Big Ten Network. The station still airs Illini men's basketball games that are carried as part of CBS's overall NCAA and Big Ten contracts including the team's championship appearance in 2005 and will air any Illini football games carried by CBS beginning in 2023 as part of its new Big Ten football package.

In 2009, WCIA's longtime weathercaster Judy Fraser retired from the station after 34 years. She was only the second head weathercaster in the station's history at the time. Meteorologist Robert Reese took over as Chief Meteorologist. His death in connection with complications from cancer in October 2012 came as a shock to the community. In his early battle, WCIA sold red ribbons in support of Reese and the American Cancer Society.

On September 11, 2014, WCIA anchor Dave Benton announced on-air that he was diagnosed with terminal brain cancer and that he had only months to live. He explained that the doctors told him that his cancer had returned and that it was too large for surgery or radiation. Benton was diagnosed with a glioblastoma in November 2013 after doctors found a tumor on the left side of his head. He underwent surgery, radiation, and chemotherapy and completed radiation treatment in February 2014. On April 13, 2015, Benton announced on the 6 p.m. newscast that he was stepping down from the anchor chair due to continued health issues and failed treatments, though he hoped to continue his signature crime reports for the 5 p.m. news as long as his health allowed. Benton died at home on May 26.

On December 3, 2018, Nexstar announced it would acquire the assets of Chicago-based Tribune Media for $6.4 billion in cash and debt. The deal—which would make Nexstar the largest television station operator by total number of stations upon its expected closure late in the third quarter of 2019—resulted in WCIA and WCIX gaining additional sister stations in nearby markets including Chicago (WGN-TV) and St. Louis (KTVI and KPLR-TV). (Ownership conflicts existed in two existing Nexstar markets involving Nexstar's duopoly of WISH-TV and WNDY-TV [which were both sold to Circle City Broadcasting] and Tribune's duopoly of WXIN and WTTV/WTTK in Indianapolis and Nexstar's virtual triopoly of WHBF-TV, KGCW and SSA partner KLJB and Tribune-owned WQAD-TV [which was sold to Tegna] in the Quad Cities.) The sale was approved by the FCC on September 16 and was completed on September 19, 2019.

== News operation ==
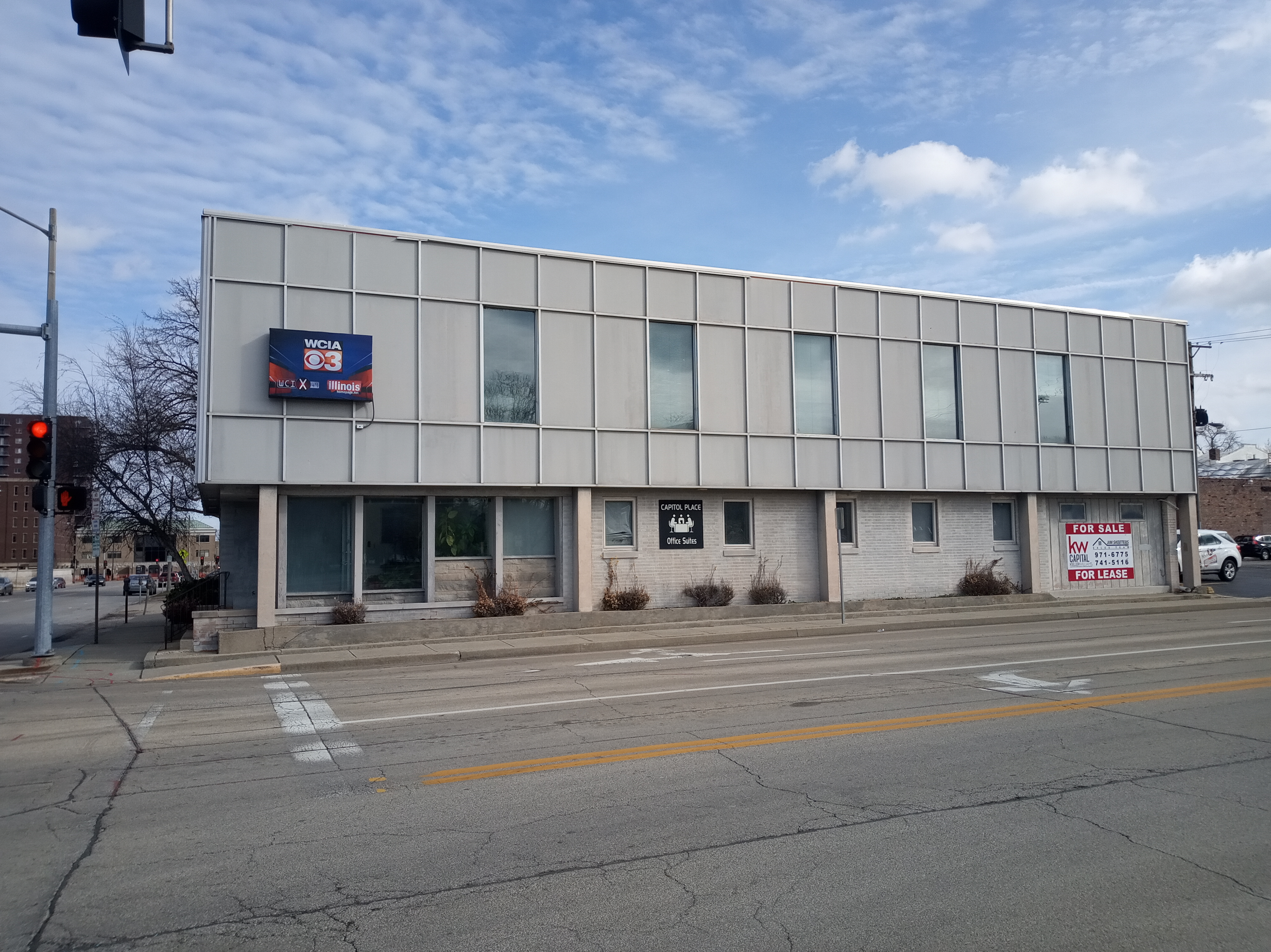
WCIA's Springfield/Capitol bureau.

WCIA currently broadcasts its news from its studios in Champaign. It currently broadcasts 40 hours of news a week, and one hour on Saturday and Sunday. For most of its history, it has been central Illinois' dominant news station, owing to its status as the market's only VHF station.

On September 12, 2011, WCIA debuted an hour-long lifestyle and news program titled ciLiving.tv, the Springfield market's first hour-long 4 p.m. news program; the show utilizes interactivity with viewers, through the use of social media platforms such as Facebook and Twitter, along with online polls and audience quizzes via text message and the station's website. The show also utilizes the station's new set, which is also used for the station's morning show, as well as other programs.

On October 24, 2012, during the 5:00 p.m. newscast, WCIA and sister station WCIX began broadcasting local news in high definition. This made the WCIA/WCIX operation the third local news operation and second "Big Four" network affiliated station to have made the upgrade. However, the newscasts on WCIX continued to be seen over the air in a letterboxed format until June 19, 2015, because its main channel was still transmitted in 4:3 standard definition until it upgraded to HD on that date.

In April 2015, WCIA expanded its 6 p.m. newscast from 30 minutes to one hour to provide better coverage of local news.

In late 2015, WCIA expanded its news coverage from the State Capitol. The station now produces and airs Capitol Connection on Sunday mornings after CBS' Face the Nation. The show is also carried on other Nexstar stations in Illinois.

In October 2016, WCIA expanded its morning show from four hours to five hours, making the station have the only local news at 9 a.m. in the market.

=== Controversies ===
==== Department of Agriculture video news releases ====
In an article published on March 13, 2005, The New York Times documented WCIA's use of government video news releases without clear attribution as such. The Times reported, "WCIA, based in Champaign, had run 26 segments made by the U.S. Agriculture Department over the past three months alone." WCIA acknowledged running the releases in the early hours of its morning news as part of its traditional service of agribusiness news to its rural viewers.

==== Abigail Metsch bikini photo ====
The station gained national attention in April 2021 when reporter Abigail Metsch posted a photo of herself on Instagram in a thong bikini, with Metsch's back facing the camera with her head turned towards the camera, completely exposing her buttocks and mentioning the station in the photo caption. After a viewer complained to the station, the News Director asked her to remove the photo. WCIA management reportedly planned to keep the punishment "in house" until it was reported on television news industry website FTVLive.com, after which the Nexstar corporate office got involved and the station was forced to terminate Metsch. Metsch removed the photo and went private on all of her social media accounts. Metsch has since resurfaced as a reporter for KBTX-TV in Bryan, Texas.

==== 2021 Champaign shooting ====
On May 19, 2021, WCIA reported that Champaign police officer Chris Oberheim had been killed in the line of duty. Officer Oberheim had responded to a domestic dispute call; during that call, shots were fired. Oberheim was shot and killed, along with Darion Lafayette who originally fired shots at the responding officers. On May 21, WCIA reported on the incident and appeared to memorialize Lafayette. A graphic provided by the Lafayette family was displayed on screen, which depicted Lafayette with angel wings. This led to a firestorm of community outrage, with complaints on social media and several businesses pulling their ads from the station.

On May 24, WCIA apologized for the story, admitting that it fell short of station standards. The station also apologized on-air on both the 9 p.m. newscast airing on WCIX and on the 10 p.m. newscast on WCIA. In subsequent weeks, general manager Sharon Rachal and news director Rich Flesch were quietly pushed out.

Almost two months later, on July 13, Nexstar regional manager Traci Wilkinson and local content director Andy Miller joined anchor Jennifer Roscoe to discuss further changes made since the incident "to be sure an error like the one we made never happens again." Miller, who worked at the station from 1997 to 2016, the last 10 of those years as news director, was brought in as interim news director in June to implement reforms.

=== Notable former on-air staff ===
- Susan Barnett
- Colleen Callahan – agribusiness reporter (1974–1997)
- John Coleman – weather anchor (1953–1957); later at WLS-TV, WMAQ-TV, and KUSI; retired in April 2014 (deceased)
- Michael Marsh
- Dana Perino (later George W. Bush administration White House Press Secretary)
- Elaine Quijano (now with CBS News)
- Martin Savidge
- Lori Stokes – anchor/reporter (1986–1988); now at WNYW

== Former logo ==
WCIA logo, c. 1970 to 2000

== Technical information ==
=== Subchannels ===
WCIA and WCIX broadcast two shared channels (CBS on 3.1 and 49.2 and MyNetworkTV on 3.2 and 49.1) and two unique diginets each. Also broadcast on the WCIA multiplex is a subchannel of WCCU as part of the market's ATSC 3.0 (NextGen TV) hosting arrangement.

Subchannels of WCIA
Channel	Res.	Short name	Programming
3.1	1080i	WCIA-HD	CBS
3.2	1080i	WCIX-HD	WCIX (Independent with MyNetworkTV)
3.3	480i	Bounce	Bounce TV
3.4	480i	Grit	Grit
27.2	480i	MeTV	MeTV (WCCU)

Simulcast of subchannels of another station
Broadcast on behalf of another station

Originally, WCFN/WCIX aired its digital signal in a reduced 4:3 480i standard-definition format on both its main channel and the digital subcarrier of WCIA. In June 2015, WCIX upgraded to a full 1080i 16:9 high definition signal, the same as WCIA. In September 2016, WCIA begin broadcasting Bounce TV on 3.3 and Grit TV on 3.4.

=== Analog-to-digital conversion ===
WCIA shut down its analog signal, over VHF channel 3, on June 12, 2009, the official date on which full-power television stations in the United States transitioned from analog to digital broadcasts under federal mandate. The station's digital signal remained on its pre-transition UHF channel 48, using virtual channel 3. On January 17, 2020, WCIA moved to channel 34 as a result of the spectrum repack.

== See also ==
- 1953 in television
