= Fox 17 =

Fox 17 may refer to:

== Current ==
- KDSM-TV in Des Moines, Iowa
- WXMI in Grand Rapids, Michigan
- WZTV in Nashville, Tennessee

== Former ==
- KTTW in Sioux Falls, South Dakota (1987–2009)
- KTVG-TV in Grand Island, Nebraska (1994–2010)
- WDBB in Bessemer, Alabama (1986–1990 and 1991–1996)
- XHFOX-TV (now XHTAM-TDT) in Reynosa, Tamaulipas (1994–2002)

== See also ==
- Channel 17 virtual TV stations in the United States
