= WICD (TV) =

Television station in Champaign, Illinois

Semi-satellite of WICS, Springfield–Decatur, Illinois
- Champaign–Urbana–Danville, Illinois; United States
- City: Champaign, Illinois
- Channels: Digital: 32 (UHF); Virtual: 15
- Branding: WICD ABC 15; NewsChannel 20

Programming
- Affiliations: 15.1: ABC; for others, see § Subchannels

Ownership
- Owner: Standard Media; (Community News Media LLC)
- Sister stations: WICS; WRSP/WCCU; WBUI

History
- First air date: April 23, 1959
- Former call signs: WCHU (1959–1967)
- Former channel numbers: Analog: 33 (UHF, 1959–1967), 15 (UHF, 1967–2009); Digital: 41 (UHF, 2002–2018)
- Former affiliations: NBC (1959–2005)
- Call sign meaning: WICS Champaign–Danville

Technical information
- Licensing authority: FCC
- Facility ID: 25684
- ERP: 1,000 kW
- HAAT: 396 m (1,299 ft)
- Transmitter coordinates: 40°4′10″N 87°54′46″W

Links
- Public license information: Public file; LMS
- Website: newschannel20.com

WICD (channel 15) is a television station licensed to Champaign, Illinois, United States, serving as one of two ABC affiliates for the Central Illinois region. Owned by Standard Media, the station maintains studios on South Country Fair Drive in Champaign, and its transmitter is located northeast of Homer, along the Vermilion–Champaign county line.

Although identifying as a separate station in its own right, WICD is considered a semi-satellite of WICS (channel 20) in Springfield–Decatur. As such, it simulcasts all network and syndicated programming as provided through its parent, and the two stations share a website. However, WICD airs separate commercial inserts and legal identifications. Local newscasts, produced by WICS, are simulcast on both stations. WICD serves the eastern half of the Central Illinois market while WICS serves the western portion. The two stations are counted as a single unit for ratings purposes. Although WICD maintains its own facilities, master control and most internal operations are based at WICS' studios on East Cook Street in Springfield's Eastside section.

Standard Media also operates the area's Fox affiliate, Springfield-licensed WRSP-TV, channel 55 (and its semi-satellite, Urbana-licensed WCCU, channel 27) as well as Decatur-licensed CW outlet WBUI (channel 23). WRSP and WBUI share studios with WICS but WBUI also maintains an advertising sales office on East William Street in downtown Decatur. WCCU's advertising sales operation is also based out of WICD's studios.

== History ==
The station signed on April 23, 1959, as WCHU (for Champaign–Urbana). It was an NBC affiliate and aired an analog signal on UHF channel 33. It was owned by Plains Television Partners and was a low-power, full-time satellite of Springfield's WICS. The WCHU signal traveled about 15 miles (24 km) from a transmitter at its studios atop the Inman Hotel in Downtown Champaign. However, getting a decent signal from Springfield (85 miles [137 km] west of Champaign) was usually hit-or-miss at best. Plains Television had to build a microwave tower in Northwestern Champaign to send the WICS signal to the WCHU studios. With a more reliable signal, the station began a more routine schedule on September 14. It began broadcasting in color the next year.

In July 1960, Plains Television Partners bought WDAN-TV in Danville. That station had debuted on December 19, 1953, as a low-powered ABC affiliate broadcasting on channel 24 with a signal radiating about 25 miles (40 km) from its transmitter. WDAN was owned by the Gannett Company along with the Danville Commercial-News newspaper and WDAN radio (1490 AM). After the sale, Plains Television changed WDAN-TV's call letters to WICD (for "WICS Danville"; Federal Communications Commission [FCC] regulations at the time required separately-owned stations to use different call signs, and the Commercial-News retained WDAN radio) and made it a full repeater of WCHU. From 1960 until 1967, WCHU/WICD aired some locally originated programs from the WCHU studios in Champaign. However, WICD's transmitter was not capable of broadcasting local programming in color.

In June 1966, Plains Television announced WCHU and WICD would merge into a single full-power station broadcasting on channel 15. It would operate under WCHU's license and studios at the Inman Hotel in Champaign, but use the WICD call letters—whose meaning was now altered to mean "WICS Champaign–Danville". The new station would broadcast at a million watts from the tallest tower in Illinois, at 1,385 feet (422 m). The new station was to have gone on-air in January 1967, but an ice storm toppled the tower. It was eventually rebuilt and the new WICD went on-air in July. However, there are unconfirmed reports of a delay in the final paperwork for the revamped station. According to some reports, it may have still been using the WCHU call letters when it signed on at full power for the first time. The station moved from the Inman Hotel to its current studio facility on Country Fair Drive in 1978.

In 1986, Plains Television sold WICS to Guy Gannett Broadcasting (no relation to the much larger Gannett Company), but retained WICD. The two stations operated as a regional network simulcasting most network and syndicated programming. This arrangement nearly brought down WICD, even though it was a very prosperous period for NBC as a whole. For much of the 1980s it looked like channel 15 would revert to being a full-time satellite of WICS. In 1994, Plains Television sold WICD to Guy Gannett, who pumped significant resources into the station, particularly its news department.

Guy Gannett then sold most of its television properties, including WICD/WICS, to the Sinclair Broadcast Group in 1999. Soon after Sinclair took over, it turned around and announced it was selling WICS/WICD as well as KGAN in Cedar Rapids, Iowa to Sunrise Television. However, the FCC did not allow Sunrise to buy WICD/WICS due to Sunrise's ownership structure. Hicks, Muse, Tate & Furst (HMTF), an investment firm controlled by then-Texas Rangers and Dallas Stars owner Tom Hicks, owned a large block of Sunrise stock. HMTF is majority stockholder of the LIN TV Corporation, then-owner of WAND in Decatur. The FCC ruled HMTF held enough stock in Sunrise that an acquisition of WICD/WICS would result in a duopoly between two of the four highest-rated stations in the market, which is forbidden by FCC rules. Sinclair subsequently withdrew the offer to sell the three stations in 2000. The station's 46-year affiliation with NBC ended on September 5, 2005, when, as part of a larger national deal between LIN TV and NBC that also involved WDTN in Dayton, Ohio (who swapped affiliations with WICS/WICD's Dayton sister station WKEF the year before), WICD and WICS swapped affiliations with WAND and became ABC affiliates.

With this switch, WICD replaced WAND as the default ABC affiliate for the Illinois side of the Terre Haute, Indiana, market, which had not had an ABC affiliate of its own since longtime affiliate WBAK-TV switched to Fox in 1995. The network swap actually improved reception for ABC programming on the Illinois side of the market. WICD's transmitter is not far from the Indiana line, while WAND's transmitter in Argenta is near the middle of the state. Due to contracts with satellite providers, for a long time WICS was the only ABC station in the market uplinked on the Champaign–Springfield–Decatur local feeds. However, Dish Network's Champaign–Springfield–Decatur feed began airing WICD on February 23, 2013, alongside WICS. For the same reason, when Dish dropped WRTV from Indianapolis as the local ABC affiliate for the Terre Haute feed, it uplinked WICS rather than WICD. This ended at the start of the 2011–12 television season, when WAWV-TV rejoined ABC.

In March 2011, WICD added music video channel TheCoolTV to its second digital subchannel and Comcast digital channel 807. On August 31, 2012, TheCoolTV was dropped from all Sinclair stations, including WICD. On December 31, 2012, Sinclair closed on the purchase of the non-license assets of GOCOM's three television stations, WRSP/WCCU and sister station WBUI for approximately $25.6 million. Sinclair provides sales and other non-programming services to the stations pursuant to shared services and joint sales agreements. Both WRSP/WCCU and WBUI were initially operated from separate facilities from WICS/WICD. However, WCCU quickly moved its advertising sales operation from its location on South Neil Street/U.S. 45 in Champaign into WICD's studios. Eventually, WRSP and WBUI also moved from their offices on Old Rochester Road in Springfield and were consolidated into WICS' facility.

On March 11, 2025, it was reported that Sinclair would sell five TV stations, including WICD and WICS, to Rincon Broadcasting Group, led by Todd Parkin. The sale was approved by the FCC on July 1, and completed on July 9. In March 2026, Community News Media LLC, which operates as Standard Media Group and is led by Soohyung Kim with Deborah McDermott as chief executive, agreed to acquire Rincon Broadcasting's stations, including WICD and WICS, for $116.5 million; the sale was completed on October 1.

== News operation ==
For its first half-century on the air, WICD operated a separate news department, airing a full schedule of newscasts. In later years, there was a considerable amount of resource sharing between the two outlets such as with video footage and personnel. This was particularly the case when covering Decatur (which is located between each of the station's studios). WICS had a slightly larger news department than WICD. Several on-air personnel at WICD performed "one-man-band" multimedia journalism duties such as shooting video, editing coverage, and producing. At one point, WICD also operated a Vermilion County Bureau on North Washington Street in Danville (home to WDAN (1490 AM), WDNL (102.1 FM), and WRHK (94.9 FM)).

Lately, WICS/WICD have been very competitive in the local news race after years of being a distant second behind longtime dominant WCIA. Beginning with the November 2006 Nielsen ratings period, the two actually briefly led with viewership in East-Central Illinois. This is because the station's ratings are combined by Nielsen Media Research and considers WICS and WICD to be a single station for counting purposes. The latter is identified as "WICS+" in ratings books and has continued battling WCIA for the top spot splitting the position over various time slots. Basically, WICD's existence benefits WICS even though the satellite is technically combined with the primary station.

Along with several other Sinclair properties, WICS/WICD did not participate in the wider implementation of the company's now-defunct, controversial News Central format for their newscasts. This operations saw local news operations reduced at some stations and combined with national news coverage, weather forecasting, and sports headlines based out of Sinclair's headquarters in Hunt Valley, Maryland. WICS/WICD, however, did air "The Point" (a one-minute conservative political commentary), that was also controversial and a requirement of all Sinclair-owned stations with newscasts until the series was discontinued in December 2006.

On September 11, 2006, a news share agreement was established with WRSP/WCCU (then separately controlled). As a result, a nightly prime time newscast began airing on those two stations that was jointly produced by WICS/WICD. Known as NewsChannel at 9 on Fox Illinois, it airs for a half-hour from a modified set at WICS's Springfield studios featuring unique duratrans indicating the Fox-branded show. From the start, NewsChannel at 9 competed with a newscast already established in the time slot on then-UPN affiliate WCFN (produced by WCIA).

Unlike the WRSP/WCCU show, WCFN's broadcast originated from WCIA's Champaign facilities but was targeted specifically at a Springfield audience. Although the WRSP/WCCU newscast featured market wide coverage, including contributions from WICD reporters, there was a separate weeknight weather segment seen on WRSP and WCCU. WCFN's prime time broadcast would be eventually canceled by WCIA on September 28, 2009. On October 7, 2013, the weekday edition of NewsChannel at 9 was expanded to an hour.

The effort on WRSP/WCCU was further expanded on January 20, 2014, when WICS began producing a two-hour weekday morning show for the Fox affiliates. Known as Good Day Illinois, the program can be seen from 7 until 9 and offers a local alternative to the national morning programs seen on the big three networks. It also competes with another two-hour local newscast seen at same time on MyNetworkTV affiliate WCIX (produced by WCIA).

On June 26, 2010, rival WAND became the first television station in East-Central Illinois to upgrade news production to high definition level. It would not be until December 2012 that local newscasts seen on WICS would be upgraded to HD. Included with the change was a new set at the Springfield studios and updated Sinclair corporate graphics. Until October 13, 2014, WICD's separate weekday newscasts at its Champaign studios were not included in the upgrade because that set lacked high definition cameras.

On March 26, 2011, WICD ceased airing its own newscasts on weekends opting to simulcast those from WICS. These broadcasts are known as ABC NewsChannel and feature a common graphics package seen on WICS and WICD. Multimedia journalists based at WICD's Champaign studios still provide coverage of the eastern areas of the market. The change represented the second attempt at a joint market-wide product by WICS/WICD. At one point in time, there had been a newscast weeknights at 5 that was simulcast on both outlets originating from Springfield.

On March 13, 2015, Sinclair announced that WICD would shut down its separate news department and cancel its weekday newscasts focused on the eastern areas of the market. This change took effect after the final WICD-produced newscast aired on April 3. In its place are newscasts simulcast from WICS (in all time slots) which provide market-wide coverage, including content from the eastern areas through a downsized bureau at WICD's studios. Despite this significant reduction, WICD began airing a full hour-long Champaign-based prime time newscast (weeknights at 9) on WCCU on April 7, 2015, entitled Fox Champaign News at Nine.

The existing hour-long WICS-produced newscast on WRSP, which had been simulcast on WCCU, was refocused to Springfield and became known as Fox News at Nine. The weekend edition of the prime time news will continue to be a market-wide product simulcast on WRSP and WCCU. With the exception of the WCCU newscast, WICD no longer produces Champaign-specific local news.

=== Notable former on-air staff ===
- Emily Carlson
- Drew Griffin (1962–2022)
- Dave Malkoff
- Kent Ninomiya

== Technical information ==
=== Subchannels ===
The station's signal is multiplexed:

Subchannels of WICD
Subchannel	Res.	Short name	Programming
15.1	720p	ABC	ABC
15.2	480i	Comet	Comet
15.3	480i	ROAR	Roar
15.4	480i	Charge!	Charge!
27.1	720p	FOX	Fox (WCCU)

Broadcast on behalf of another station

=== Analog-to-digital conversion ===
WICD shut down its analog signal, over UHF channel 15, on February 17, 2009, the original target date on which full-power television stations in the United States were to transition from analog to digital broadcasts under federal mandate (which was later pushed back to June 12, 2009). The station's digital signal remained on its pre-transition UHF channel 41, using virtual channel 15.
