= NBC Springfield =

NBC Springfield could refer to:

- WWLP (Springfield, Massachusetts)
- WAND (TV) (Springfield, Illinois)
- KYTV (TV station) (Springfield, Missouri)
