= WCCU =

WCCU may refer to:

- WCCU (TV), a television station (channel 36, digital 27) licensed to Urbana, Illinois, United States
- WCCU (student radio), an internet-only radio station serving Coastal Carolina University in Conway, South Carolina, United States
