= Michael Marsh (journalist) =

Michael Marsh is a New Orleans native and former television news anchor on WBRZ-TV. He previously anchored the weekend newscasts and served as both a reporter and a weekend anchor on WBRZ from 1977 to 1982.

Marsh received a bachelor's degree in Journalism from Louisiana State University in 1975. With 31 years of broadcast experience, he has worked at stations in San Antonio, followed by reporting and anchoring stints in San Francisco, Denver, Atlanta, Charlotte, North Carolina, New Orleans, and Champaign, Illinois.

The son of a Navy officer, Marsh said his military childhood prepared him for the many moves necessitated by a career in TV news.

While a reporter in Atlanta, Marsh covered the case of Roy Moody, who carried out a series of mail bombings against the National Association for the Advancement of Colored People and the federal judicial system in 1989. He is mentioned in Mark Winne's book about the case, Priority Mail: The Investigation and Trial of a Mail Bomber Obsessed With Destroying Our Justice System.

He also covered the preparations of troops at two Georgia military installations - Fort Stewart and Moody Air Force Base - who later had major roles in the Persian Gulf War.

While working at several of these stations, Michael received numerous newscast awards. He also won the UPI Award for Economics Reporting. He left WBRZ in 2015 and became Communications Director for University View Academy, a virtual charter school servicing students throughout Louisiana, in September 2016.

== Marsh's TV Resume ==
- WBRZ-TV Baton Rouge
- KPIX-TV San Francisco
- KMGH-TV Denver
- WSB-TV Atlanta
- WBTV Charlotte
- WDSU-TV New Orleans
- WCIA Champaign, Illinois
- WBRZ-TV Baton Rouge
- KENS-TV San Antonio
