= WICS =

Television station in Springfield, Illinois

- Springfield–Decatur, Illinois; United States
- City: Springfield, Illinois
- Channels: Digital: 15 (UHF); Virtual: 20
- Branding: WICS ABC 20; NewsChannel 20

Programming
- Affiliations: 20.1: ABC; for others, see § Subchannels

Ownership
- Owner: Standard Media; (Community News Media LLC)
- Sister stations: WICD; WRSP/WCCU; WBUI

History
- First air date: September 17, 1953
- Former channel numbers: Analog: 20 (UHF, 1953–2009); Digital: 42 (UHF, 2001–2020)
- Former affiliations: NBC (1953–2005); DuMont (secondary, 1953–1955); CBS (secondary, 1953–1958)
- Call sign meaning: We're Illinois' Capital, Springfield

Technical information
- Licensing authority: FCC
- Facility ID: 25686
- ERP: 300 kW
- HAAT: 436 m (1,430 ft)
- Transmitter coordinates: 39°48′15″N 89°27′40″W

Links
- Public license information: Public file; LMS
- Website: newschannel20.com

WICS (channel 20) is a television station licensed to Springfield, Illinois, United States, serving as one of two ABC affiliates for the Central Illinois region. The station is owned by Standard Media, and maintains studios on East Cook Street in Springfield's Eastside; its transmitter is located west of Mechanicsburg, in unincorporated Sangamon County.

WICD (channel 15) in Champaign–Urbana operates as a semi-satellite of WICS. As such, it simulcasts all network and syndicated programming as provided through WICS, and the two stations share a website. However, WICD airs separate commercial inserts and legal identifications. Local newscasts, produced by WICS, are simulcast on both stations. WICS serves the western half of the Central Illinois market while WICD serves the eastern portion. The two stations are counted as a single unit for ratings purposes. Although WICD maintains its own studios on South Country Fair Drive in Champaign, master control and most internal operations are based at WICS' facilities.

Standard Media also operates the area's Fox affiliate, Springfield-licensed WRSP-TV, channel 55 (and its semi-satellite, Urbana-licensed WCCU, channel 27), as well as Decatur-licensed CW outlet WBUI (channel 23). WRSP and WBUI share studios with WICS but WBUI also maintains an advertising sales office on East William Street in downtown Decatur. WCCU's advertising sales operation is also based out of WICD's studios.

== History ==
WICS began operations on September 17, 1953, and was owned by Plains Television Partners of Springfield, which was a 50/50 joint venture of Transcontinental Properties and the H & E Balaban Corporation. It carried programming from all four networks of the era (NBC, CBS, ABC, and DuMont). However, it was a primary NBC affiliate. Although the Federal Communications Commission (FCC) had collapsed most of East Central Illinois into one giant television market, WICS took on a secondary CBS affiliation because its primary affiliate, WCIA in Champaign, only provided a marginal signal to Springfield. It also aired whatever ABC programs WTVP in Decatur (now WAND) had to turn down in order to air CBS shows not cleared by WCIA.

By 1958, WICS was an exclusive NBC affiliate. The station originally had facilities at the Leland Hotel on Capitol Street in Downtown Springfield. In 1964, it moved to its current studios on East Cook Street in East Springfield. The FCC considered making East Central Illinois an all-UHF market but dropped these plans under heavy lobbying from WCIA.

However, WICS' signal was not nearly strong enough to reach the eastern portion of the area. At the time, UHF signals were not strong enough to cover large amounts of territory. Accordingly in 1959, Plains Television signed-on WCHU in Champaign as a low-power satellite of WICS. In 1960, it bought WDAN-TV (another low-power station in Danville) and changed the calls to WICD. At the same time, WCHU began breaking off from the WICS signal to air some local programming for the eastern side of the market, which was simulcast on WICD. In 1967, Plains Television merged WCHU and WICD into a new full-power station on UHF channel 15 under the WICD calls, but operating under the WCHU license.

Plains Television sold WICS to Guy Gannett Communications (no relation to the larger Gannett Company), in 1986 but held onto WICD until 1994. The two stations operated as a regional network sharing most network and syndicated programming. This arrangement nearly brought down WICD, and for a time, it appeared the station would revert to a full-time satellite of WICS. Guy Gannett finally bought WICD in 1994.

WICS final logo as an NBC affiliate, used from 1994 until September 4, 2005

Sinclair Broadcast Group purchased most of Guy Gannett's stations, including WICS and WICD, in 1999. The company almost immediately turned around and announced it was selling the two (which count as one for regulatory purposes) plus KGAN in Cedar Rapids, Iowa, to Sunrise Television. However, the FCC did not allow Sunrise to buy WICS/WICD due to Sunrise's ownership structure. Hicks, Muse, Tate & Furst (HMTF), an investment firm controlled by then-Texas Rangers and Dallas Stars owner Tom Hicks, owned a large block of Sunrise stock. HMTF was the majority stockholder of the LIN TV Corporation, then-owner of WAND. The FCC ruled HMTF held enough stock in Sunrise that if it bought WICS/WICD, it would have created a duopoly between two of the four highest-rated stations in the market, which is forbidden by FCC rules. With the eventual relaxation of ownership limits, Sinclair soon took the stations off the market and retained them.

On September 5, 2005, the two stations swapped affiliations with WAND and became ABC affiliates as part of a larger national deal between LIN and NBC that also involved WDTN in Dayton, Ohio (who swapped affiliations with WICS/WICD's Dayton sister station WKEF the year before). WICS/WICD was to have switched to ABC at the beginning of the 2004–05 television season, but it was required to remain with NBC for another year, as its affiliation contract with the station did not expire until September 4 of the following year. On November 17, 2010, WICS became available to Dish Network customers in Terre Haute, Indiana, as the ABC affiliate since the market lacked an affiliate of its own. WICD's transmitter is near the border between Illinois and Indiana, and WICD was carried on most cable systems on the Illinois side of the Terre Haute market. However, WICS was the only station uplinked by satellite providers due to contractual obligations, since it was considered the main station. WICS disappeared from the Terre Haute local feed in the fall of 2011 after that city's Fox affiliate, WFXW, rejoined ABC as WAWV-TV.

On December 31, 2012, Sinclair closed on the purchase of the non-license assets of GOCOM's three television stations, WRSP/WCCU and sister station WBUI for approximately $25.6 million. Sinclair provides sales and other non-programming services to the stations pursuant to shared services and joint sales agreements. Both WRSP/WCCU and WBUI were initially operated from separate facilities from WICS/WICD. However, WCCU quickly moved its advertising sales operation from its location on South Neil Street/U.S. 45 in Champaign into WICD's studios. Eventually, WRSP and WBUI also moved from their offices on Old Rochester Road in Springfield and were consolidated into WICS' facility.

On March 11, 2025, it was reported that Sinclair would sell five TV stations, including WICS and WICD, to Rincon Broadcasting Group, led by Todd Parkin. The sale was approved by the FCC on July 1, and completed on July 9. In March 2026, Community News Media LLC, which operates as Standard Media Group and is led by Soohyung Kim with Deborah McDermott as chief executive, agreed to acquire Rincon Broadcasting's stations, including WICS and WICD, for $116.5 million; the sale was completed on October 1.

== News operation ==
Along with several other Sinclair properties, WICS/WICD did not participate in the wider implementation of the company's now-defunct, controversial News Central format for their newscasts. This format saw local news operations reduced at some stations and combined with national news coverage, weather forecasting, and sports headlines based out of Sinclair's headquarters in Hunt Valley, Maryland. WICS/WICD, however, did air The Point (a one-minute conservative political commentary) that was also controversial and a requirement of all Sinclair-owned stations with newscasts until the series was discontinued in December 2006.

On September 11, 2006, a news share agreement was established with WRSP/WCCU (then separately controlled). As a result, a nightly prime time newscast began airing on those two stations that was jointly produced by WICS/WICD. Known as NewsChannel at 9 on Fox Illinois, it aired for a half-hour from a modified set at WICS' Springfield studios featuring unique duratrans indicating the Fox-branded show. From the start, NewsChannel at 9 competed with a newscast already established in the time slot on then-UPN affiliate WCFN (produced by WCIA). Unlike the WRSP/WCCU show, WCFN's broadcast originated from WCIA's Champaign facilities but was targeted specifically at a Springfield audience. Although the WRSP/WCCU newscast features market wide coverage, including contributions from WICD reporters based in Champaign, there is a separate weeknight weather segment for WRSP and WCCU that was seen. WCFN's prime time broadcast would be eventually canceled by WCIA on September 28, 2009. On October 7, 2013, the weekday edition of NewsChannel at 9 was expanded to an hour.

The effort on WRSP/WCCU was further expanded on January 20, 2014, when WICS began producing a two-hour weekday morning show for the Fox affiliates. Known as Good Day Illinois, the program can be seen from 7 to 9 a.m. and offers a local alternative to the national morning programs seen on the big three networks. It also competes with another two-hour local newscast seen at same time on MyNetworkTV affiliate WCIX (produced by WCIA). On June 26, 2010, rival WAND became the first television station in East-Central Illinois to upgrade news production to high definition level. It was not until December 2012 that local newscasts seen on WICS were upgraded to HD. Included with the change was a new set at the Springfield studios and updated Sinclair corporate graphics. Until October 13, 2014, WICD's separate weekday newscasts at its Champaign studios were not included in the upgrade because that set lacked high definition cameras.

On March 26, 2011, WICD ceased airing its own newscasts on weekends opting to simulcast those from WICS. These broadcasts are known as ABC NewsChannel and feature a common graphics package seen on WICS and WICD. Multimedia journalists based at WICD's Champaign studios still provide coverage of the eastern areas of the market. The change represented the second attempt at a joint market-wide product by WICS/WICD. At one point in time, there had been a newscast weeknights at 5 that was simulcast on both outlets originating from Springfield.

On March 13, 2015, Sinclair announced that WICD would stop offering separate newscasts on weekdays that focus on the eastern areas of the market (Champaign–Urbana–Danville). This change took effect after the final WICD-produced newscast aired on April 3. In its place are newscasts simulcast from WICS (in all time slots) which provide market-wide coverage including content from the eastern areas through a downsized bureau at WICD's studios. On April 7, 2015, despite this significant reduction, WICD began airing a full sixty-minute Champaign-based prime time newscast (weeknights at 9) on WCCU entitled Fox Champaign News at Nine.

The existing hour-long WICS-produced newscast on WRSP, which had been simulcast on WCCU, was refocused to Springfield and became known as Fox News at Nine. The weekend edition of the prime time news will continue to be a market-wide simulcast on WRSP and WCCU. With the exception of the WCCU newscast, WICD no longer produces Champaign-specific local news. While WICS and WICD operated separate news departments, there was a considerable amount of resource sharing between the two outlets, such as with video footage and personnel. This was particularly the case when covering Decatur (located between Springfield and Champaign).

In June 2019, Sinclair fired Joe Crain, a weekday morning meteorologist who had been with WICS since 2006, for speaking out on-air – during the June 5 edition of NewsChannel 20 Sunrise – against a group mandate to Sinclair's news-producing stations to denote threats of severe thunderstorm activity through "Code Red" alerts, regardless of the severity of the event being forecast, stating that the system was "created by, likely, a journalism school graduate", rather than a professional meteorologist. (The initiative, which Sinclair began implementing in 2018 and is similar to systems devised by other groups such as Gray Television through the stations it inherited from the now-defunct Raycom Media, is known by different names depending on the station, such as "Weather Warn" or as a "(weather branding) Alert Day".) Critics of the initiative stated that the "Code Red" days unnecessarily alarm Central Illinois-area residents and harms local business revenue on the designated days.

Despite complaints and comments from viewers on the station's social media platforms, letters to the editor and local talk radio shows, Sinclair continued to mandate its meteorologists to use the terminology. The station's social media page was flooded with comments from viewers demanding the reinstatement of Joe Crain, pushing the hashtag #IStandWithJoeCrain, while U.S. Senator Dick Durbin stated that the "Code Red" system "overstat[es] the danger to our community". Despite this, by June 11, Sinclair posted an advertisement on its website seeking a replacement for Crain as meteorologist for WICD/WICS and WRSP/WCCU's morning newscasts. On June 13, a spokesman for Sinclair stated that he had been, in fact, let go. This is not the first time the station has taken issue with talent popular with their viewers; in 2015, chief meteorologist Ric Kearbey was unable to reach a deal with WICS on a new contract, while anchor Liz Foster resigned to take a new position in Charlotte, North Carolina.

=== Notable former on-air staff ===
- Vince DeMentri
- Scott Hanson
- Aishah Hasnie
- Fred Hickman
- Rebecca Paul

== Technical information ==
=== Subchannels ===
The station's signal is multiplexed:

Subchannels of WICS
Subchannel	Res.	Short name	Programming
20.1	720p	ABC	ABC
20.2	480i	Comet	Comet
20.3	480i	ROAR	Roar
20.4	480i	Charge!	Charge!
55.1	720p	FOX	Fox (WRSP-TV)

Broadcast on behalf of another station

=== Analog-to-digital conversion ===
WICS shut down its analog signal, over UHF channel 20, on February 17, 2009, the original target date on which full-power television stations in the United States were to transition from analog to digital broadcasts under federal mandate (which was later pushed back to June 12, 2009). The station's digital signal remained on its pre-transition UHF channel 42, using virtual channel 20.
