= WBXC-CD =

Television station in Champaign–Urbana, Illinois

- Champaign–Urbana, Illinois; United States
- Channels: Digital: 18 (UHF); Virtual: 18

Programming
- Affiliations: 18.1: Heartland; for others, see § Subchannels

Ownership
- Owner: Gray Media; (Gray Television Licensee, LLC)
- Sister stations: WAND

History
- Founded: November 16, 1994
- Former call signs: W46CH (1994–2001); WBXC-CA (2001–2015)
- Former channel numbers: Analog: 46 (1995–2015); Digital: 46 (2015–2019)
- Former affiliations: The Box (until 2001); MTV2; America One (until 2015); Sonlife (2015–201?); Buzzr (201?–2022); The Country Network (2022–2023)
- Call sign meaning: Box Channel (former affiliation)

Technical information
- Licensing authority: FCC
- Facility ID: 70428
- Class: CD
- ERP: 15 kW; 3 kW (STA)
- HAAT: 86.4 m (283 ft); 86.9 m (285 ft) (STA)
- Transmitter coordinates: 40°6′40″N 88°14′35″W

Links
- Public license information: Public file; LMS

WBXC-CD (channel 18) is a low-power, Class A television station licensed to both Champaign and Urbana, Illinois, United States, affiliated with the country music-oriented diginet Heartland. It is owned by Gray Media alongside NBC affiliate WAND (channel 17).

== History ==
In March 2022, it was announced that Gray Television would acquire WBXC-CD along with three other stations from L4 Media Group.

== Subchannels ==
The station's signal is multiplexed:

Subchannels of WBXC-CD
Channel	Res.	Short name	Programming
18.1	480i	HeartLA	Heartland (4:3)
18.2	480i	SonLife	Sonlife (4:3)
18.3	480i	OUTLAW	Outlaw
18.4	480i	Buzzr	Buzzr (4:3)
18.5	480i	Indepen	365BLK (4:3)
