= WRSP-TV =

Television station in Springfield, Illinois

WRSP-TV and WCCU
ATSC 3.0 station

WRSP-TV: Springfield–Decatur, Illinois; WCCU: Urbana–Champaign, Illinois; United States
- Channels for WRSP-TV: Digital: 16 (UHF); Virtual: 55
- Channels for WCCU: Digital: 36 (UHF); Virtual: 27
- Branding: Fox Illinois; Fox Illinois News

Programming
- Affiliations: 55.1/27.1: Fox; for others, see § Subchannels

Ownership
- Owner: GOCOM Media, LLC; (GOCOM Media of Illinois, LLC)
- Operator: Standard Media
- Sister stations: WBUI; WICS; WICD

History
- First air date: WRSP-TV: June 1, 1979; WCCU: February 19, 1986
- Former call signs: WRSP-TV: WBHW (1979–1982)
- Former channel number: WRSP-TV: Analog: 55 (UHF, 1979–2009); Digital: 44 (UHF, 1999–2020); WCCU: Analog: 27 (UHF, 1986–2009); Digital: 26 (UHF, 2001–2020)
- Former affiliations: WRSP-TV: Independent (1979–1986)
- Call sign meaning: WRSP-TV: For "Springfield"; WCCU: Central Illinois Champaign–Urbana

Technical information
- Licensing authority: FCC
- Facility ID: WRSP-TV: 62009; WCCU: 69544
- ERP: WRSP-TV: 310 kW; WCCU: 125 kW
- HAAT: WRSP-TV: 436 m (1,430 ft); WCCU: 381 m (1,250 ft)
- Transmitter coordinates: WRSP-TV: 39°48′15″N 89°27′40″W; WCCU: 40°4′10″N 87°54′46″W

Links
- Public license information: WRSP-TV: Public file; LMS; WCCU: Public file; LMS
- Website: foxillinois.com

WRSP-TV (channel 55) in Springfield, Illinois, and WCCU (channel 27) in Urbana, Illinois, collectively branded Fox Illinois, are television stations serving as the Fox network affiliates for Central Illinois. They are owned by GOCOM Media, LLC, sharing common ownership with Decatur-licensed CW affiliate WBUI (channel 23), and are operated by Standard Media, owner of Springfield-licensed ABC affiliate WICS, channel 20 (and its semi-satellite, Champaign-licensed WICD, channel 15). WRSP's transmitter is located west of Mechanicsburg, in unincorporated Sangamon County; the station shares studio facilities with WBUI and WICS on East Cook Street in Springfield's Eastside. However, WBUI also operates an advertising sales office on East William Street in downtown Decatur.

WCCU operates as a semi-satellite of WRSP for the eastern portion of the Central Illinois market, including Danville. As such, it clears all network and syndicated programming from its parent but airs separate local commercial inserts and legal identifications. WCCU's transmitter is located northeast of Homer, along the Vermilion–Champaign county line; it shares studio facilities with WICD on South Country Fair Drive in downtown Champaign.

== History ==
What is now WRSP signed on June 1, 1979, as WBHW, a religious independent (the call letters stood for "We Believe His Word"). It aired an analog signal on UHF channel 55 and was built by the Windmill Broadcasting Company, which had received the construction permit in September 1978. It was the first new commercial station in the market (not counting satellite stations) since WCIA launched back in 1953. On November 24, 1982, it was sold to new owners who changed the call letters to WRSP-TV and turned it into the area's first general entertainment independent.

In the winter of 1985, WRSP announced it would join the upstart Fox network the following year. As part of the agreement, on February 19, 1986, it added full-time satellite WCCU in Urbana, with an analog signal on UHF channel 27. Both stations began transmitting digital signals in mid-2000 with programming from Fox in high definition. It eventually introduced a new website based on the "My Fox" owned-and-operated station platform licensed from News Corporation Interactive.

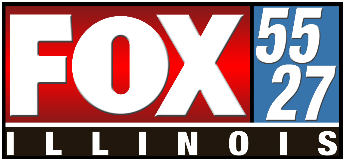
WRSP/WCCU's logo from 2006–2019.

On June 20, 2007, GOCOM Media announced its intent to purchase WBUI from ACME Communications. The sale was approved on September 14 by the Federal Communications Commission (FCC), which allowed GOCOM to buy WBUI under a "failed station" waiver to its duopoly rules. The Central Illinois market already had one duopoly, Nexstar Broadcasting Group's WCIA and WCFN, and under normal conditions there wouldn't have been enough unique station owners to allow a second duopoly.

However, ACME claimed it was losing money on WBUI and could not find a buyer that did not require a duopoly waiver. The sale to GOCOM Media officially closed on October 25, 2007. At that point, WBUI consolidated its operations from its original studios at North Parkway Court in Decatur into WRSP's facilities in Springfield. In mid-2010, WRSP's web site was taken over by Broadcast Interactive Media.

On December 31, 2012, Sinclair closed on the purchase of the non-license assets of GOCOM's three television stations, WRSP/WCCU and sister station WBUI for approximately $25.6 million. Sinclair is providing sales and other non-programming services to the stations pursuant to shared services and joint sales agreements. Both WRSP/WCCU and WBUI were initially operated from separate facilities from WICS/WICD.

However, WCCU quickly moved its advertising sales operation from its location on South Neil Street/US 45 in Champaign into WICD's studios. Eventually, WRSP and WBUI also moved from their offices on Old Rochester Road in Springfield and were consolidated into WICS' facility.

On July 28, 2021, the FCC issued a Forfeiture Order stemming from a lawsuit against WRSP/WCCU/WBUI owner GOCOM Media. The lawsuit, filed by AT&T, alleged that GOCOM failed to negotiate for retransmission consent in good faith for the stations. Owners of other Sinclair-managed stations, such as Deerfield Media, were also named in the lawsuit. GOCOM was ordered to pay a fine of $1,536,684.

== News operation ==
On September 11, 2006, WRSP/WCCU (then separately controlled) established a news share agreement with WICS/WICD. As a result, a nightly prime time newscast began airing on the Fox affiliates that was jointly produced by the two ABC outlets. Known as NewsChannel at 9 on Fox Illinois, it aired from a modified set at WICS's Springfield studios featuring unique duratrans indicating the Fox-branded show. From the start, NewsChannel at 9 competed with a newscast already established in the time slot on then-UPN affiliate WCFN (produced by WCIA).

Unlike the WRSP/WCCU show, WCFN's broadcast originated from WCIA's Champaign facilities but was targeted specifically at a Springfield audience. The WRSP/WCCU newscast featured market wide coverage, including contributions from WICD reporters, but there was a separate weeknight weather segment for WRSP and WCCU. WCFN's prime time broadcast would be eventually canceled by WCIA on September 28, 2009. On October 7, 2013, the weekday edition NewsChannel at 9 was expanded to an hour.

The effort on WRSP/WCCU was further expanded on January 20, 2014, when WICS began producing a two-hour weekday morning show for the Fox affiliates. Known as Good Day Illinois, the program can be seen from 7 until 9 and offers a local alternative to the national morning programs seen on the big three networks. It also competes with another two-hour local newscast seen at same time on MyNetworkTV affiliate WCIX (produced by WCIA).

On March 13, 2015, Sinclair announced that WICD would stop offering separate newscasts on weekdays that focus on the eastern areas of the market (Champaign/Urbana/Danville). This change took effect after the final WICD-produced newscast aired on April 3. In its place are newscasts simulcast from WICS (in all time slots) which provide market-wide coverage including content from the eastern areas through a downsized bureau at WICD's studios. On April 7, 2015, despite this significant reduction, WICD began airing a full sixty-minute Champaign-based prime time newscast (weeknights at 9) on WCCU entitled Fox Champaign News at Nine.

The existing hour-long WICS-produced newscast on WRSP, which had been simulcast on WCCU, was refocused to Springfield and became known as Fox News at Nine. As such, WICD no longer produces Champaign-specific local news.

== Technical information ==
=== Subchannels ===
Subchannels provided by WRSP-TV (ATSC 1.0)
Subchannel	Res.	Short name	Programming	ATSC 1.0 host
55.1	720p	FOX	Fox	WICS
55.2	480i	TrueCri	True Crime Network	WCIX
55.3	480i	Antenna	Antenna TV	WAND

Subchannels provided by WCCU (ATSC 1.0)
Subchannel	Res.	Short name	Programming	ATSC 1.0 host
27.1	720p	FOX	Fox	WICD
27.2	480i	MeTV	MeTV	WCIA
27.3	480i	Antenna	Antenna TV	WBUI

=== Analog-to-digital conversion ===
Both stations shut down their analog signals, respectively on February 17, 2009, the original target date on which full-power television stations in the United States were to transition from analog to digital broadcasts under federal mandate (which was later pushed back to June 12, 2009). The station's digital channel allocations post-transition are as follows:

- WRSP-TV shut down its analog signal, over UHF channel 55; the station's digital signal remained on its pre-transition UHF channel 44, using virtual channel 55. On July 1, 2020, WRSP-TV moved its digital channel from UHF 44 to UHF 16.
- WCCU shut down its analog signal, over UHF channel 27; the station's digital signal remained on its pre-transition UHF channel 26, using virtual channel 27. On January 14, 2020, WCCU moved its digital channel from UHF 26 to UHF 36.

=== ATSC 3.0 ===
Subchannels of WRSP-TV (ATSC 3.0)
Subchannel	Res.	Short name	Programming
17.1	1080p	WAND	NBC (WAND)
20.1	720p	WICS	ABC (WICS)
20.10	1080p	T2	T2
20.11		PBTV	Pickleballtv
49.1	1080p	WCIX	MyNetworkTV (WCIX)
55.1	720p	WRSP	Fox

Subchannel streamed via the Internet

Subchannels of WCCU (ATSC 3.0)
Subchannel	Res.	Short name	Programming
3.1	1080p	WCIA	CBS (WCIA)
15.1	720p	WICD	ABC (WICD)
15.10	1080p	T2	T2
15.11		PBTV	Pickleballtv
23.1	1080p	WBUI	The CW (WBUI)
27.1	720p	WCCU	Fox

Subchannel streamed via the Internet

On December 6, 2022, WRSP/WCCU began broadcasting an ATSC 3.0 NextGen TV signal for the Champaign–Springfield market.
