= Emily Carlson =

Emily Carlson is a broadcast journalist and former competitive figure skater.

== Television ==
Carlson is a reporter at WHO-TV Des Moines, Iowa. Prior to that she was a reporter at KTVA-TV in Anchorage, Alaska. Before that she reported for TV30 in the Bay Area of California until it stopped doing news in June 2008. In 2006 and 2007 she reported for WICD in Champaign, Illinois. In 2005 and 2006 she was a reporter and news anchor at KEYC in Mankato, Minnesota where she covered the escape of convicted rapist Michael Benson. Carlson gained national notoriety when she helped America's Most Wanted compile information on Benson that led to his capture and arrest. In 2004 and 2005 Carlson worked for both the consumer investigations unit and the political unit at the Minnesota State Capitol for KSTP-TV in Minneapolis, Minnesota.

== Figure skating ==
In 2000, Emily Carlson won the Sparks Sternaman Founders Trophy in Eau Claire, Wisconsin and the Braemar McCandless Memorial Trophy for winning both Junior Ladies Freestyle events. In 2001, Emily Carlson won the Eleanor Fisher Figure Skating Crown from Braemar City of Lakes Figure Skating Club in Edina, Minnesota. Carlson won two gold medals and rose to the top two percent of competitive figure skaters at the United States Figure Skating Association senior level when she passed a series of eight tests in both freestyle skating and moves.

== Private life ==
Carlson was born in 1983 and raised near Minneapolis, Minnesota. She was graduated from the Academy of Holy Angels and the University of St. Thomas in St. Paul, Minnesota. Carlson earned a bachelor's degree in English and Broadcast Journalism.
