= Jim Kosek =

American television meteorologist

- Born: West Pittston, Pennsylvania
- Education: Pennsylvania State University
- Occupations: Meteorologist, television personality
- Years active: 1985–present
- Employer(s): AccuWeather (1985–2012); KTVX (2012–2014); WGCL-TV (2014–2017); WLTZ (2018-2019); WAND (2019-current)

Jim Kosek is an American television meteorologist currently working as the chief meteorologist at WAND in Decatur, Illinois. Kosek is best known for his presentation style, which includes loud exclamations, exaggerated motions, tie-ins to popular culture, and screaming comparable to that popularized by comedian Sam Kinison.

== Career ==
Jim Kosek studied meteorology at Penn State University, and after graduation found employment with AccuWeather in 1985. He started out as a rather straightfaced weatherman, but began acting quite strangely from the 1990s onward. He has been described by Business Insider as "the Bill O'Reilly of weather", by The Washington Post as "Al Roker meets Sam Kinison," and by Jimmy Kimmel as the equivalent of "Glenn Beck becom[ing] a meteorologist." His last day with Accuweather was January 11, 2012.

He began employment as Chief Meteorologist for KTVX ABC 4 in Salt Lake City, Utah on January 18, 2012, and ended his employment sometime in the summer of 2014. He was replaced by Dan Pope who returned to KTVX. After KTVX, Kosek began presenting weather at KCTV in Kansas City, Missouri.

He joined WGCL-TV in Atlanta on December 1, 2014, and made his return to the Chief Meteorologist position. Jim's final day on WGCL was June 23, 2017, after being let go by the station. In December of that year, he joined WLTZ in Columbus, Georgia as the station's chief meteorologist and held that position until August 2019.

== See also ==
- Al Kaprielian
