= Channel 17 virtual TV stations in the United States =

The following television stations operate on virtual channel 17 in the United States:

- K14TG-D in Monterey, California
- K16IS-D in Pittsburg, Kansas
- K16JS-D in Eugene, Oregon
- K17BV-D in Redwood Falls, Minnesota
- K17DL-D in Branson, Missouri
- K17DU-D in Christmas Valley, Oregon
- K17ED-D in Payette, Idaho
- K17GD-D in Paso Robles, California
- K17GE-D in Dove Creek, etc., Colorado
- K17GJ-D in Twentynine Palms, California
- K17HI-D in Amarillo, Texas
- K17JJ-D in Cortez, Colorado
- K17JN-D in Enid, Oklahoma
- K17KW-D in Gettysburg, South Dakota
- K17LM-D in Yuma, Arizona
- K17LP-D in Fruitland, New Mexico
- K17LV-D in Paragould, Arkansas
- K17MP-D in Midland, Texas
- K17MS-D in Poplar, Montana
- K17MW-D in St. James, Minnesota
- K17OV-D in Duluth, Minnesota
- K17OW-D in Hobbs, New Mexico
- K17OX-D in Seward, Alaska
- K17OY-D in Centerville, Washington
- K17PA-D in Mullan, Idaho
- K18NT-D in Grand Forks, North Dakota
- K26OH-D in Roseau, Minnesota
- KAAS-LP in Garden City, Kansas
- KAAS-TV in Salina, Kansas
- KABH-CD in Bend, Oregon
- KBMY in Bismarck, North Dakota
- KBNT-CD in San Diego, California
- KDOR-TV in Bartlesville, Oklahoma
- KDSM-TV in Des Moines, Iowa
- KEEN-CD in Las Vegas, Nevada
- KGET-TV in Bakersfield, California
- KHAX-LD in Vista, California
- KIDU-LD in Brownwood, Texas
- KLDF-CD in Lompoc, California
- KMIZ in Columbia, Missouri
- KMOL-LD in Victoria, Texas
- KMPH-CD in Merced-Mariposa, California
- KMWE-LD in Saint Cloud, Minnesota
- KNIC-DT in Blanco, Texas
- KOCW in Hoisington, Kansas
- KODG-LD in Palm Springs, California
- KOOH-LD in Helena, Montana
- KPCB-DT in Snyder, Texas
- KSAS-LP in Dodge City, Kansas
- KSBB-CD in Santa Barbara, California
- KSWL-LD in Lake Charles, Louisiana
- KVAT-LD in Austin, Texas
- KVDO-LD in Albany, Oregon
- KWVT-LD in Salem, Oregon
- KXVU-LD in Chico, California
- KYTL-LD in Twin Falls, Idaho
- W09CZ-D in Roslyn, New York
- W17CT-D in Manteo, North Carolina
- W17DL-D in Toa Baja, Puerto Rico
- W17DO-D in Wilmington, North Carolina
- W17EH-D in Quincy, Illinois
- W17EI-D in Jackson, Tennessee
- W17EM-D in Panama City, Florida
- W17ES-D in Adel, Georgia
- W18ER-D in Muskegon, Michigan
- W22FB-D in Marion, North Carolina
- W23EQ-D in Danville, Illinois
- W23ER-D in Poughkeepsie, New York
- W29ES-D in Jacksonville, Illinois
- W29EY-D in Columbia, Mississippi
- W29FE-D in Bat Cave, etc., North Carolina
- W36FA-D in Hesperia, Michigan
- WALE-LD in Montgomery, Alabama
- WAND (TV) in Decatur, Illinois
- WBMN-LD in Ocala, Florida
- WBZM-LD in Wilkes-Barre, Pennsylvania
- WCWJ in Jacksonville, Florida
- WDBB in Bessemer, Alabama
- WDEM-CD in Columbus, Ohio
- WDLI-TV in Canton, Ohio
- WEWA-LD in Wewahitchka, Florida
- WFFC-LD in Midland, Michigan
- WIIH-CD in Indianapolis, Indiana
- WKTD-CD in Portsmouth, Virginia
- WLIG-LD in Plainview, etc., New York, on virtual channel 17
- WLRN-TV in Miami, Florida
- WMAU-TV in Bude, Mississippi
- WMHT in Schenectady, New York
- WNCN in Goldsboro, North Carolina
- WNED-TV in Buffalo, New York
- WPCH-TV in Atlanta, Georgia
- WPHL-TV in Philadelphia, Pennsylvania
- WQFT-LD in Ocala, Florida
- WRLW-CD in Salem, Indiana
- WTVO in Rockford, Illinois
- WUNE-TV in Linville, North Carolina
- WVMA-CD in Winchendon, Massachusetts
- WVXF in Charlotte Amalie, U.S. Virgin Islands
- WWOO-LD in Westmoreland, New Hampshire
- WXMI in Grand Rapids, Michigan
- WXVT-LD in Cleveland, Mississippi
- WZTV in Nashville, Tennessee

The following television stations, which are no longer licensed, formerly operated on virtual channel 17 in the United States:

- K12QZ-D in San Luis Obispo, California
- K17AF-D in Delta Junction, Alaska
- KGLU-LD in Ottumwa, Iowa
- KHJL-LD in Rapid City, South Dakota
- KJRW in Eureka, California
- KNTS-LP in Natchitoches, Louisiana
- W42AX-D in Bakersville, North Carolina
- WBKH-LD in Port Charlotte, Florida
- WDYI-LD in Macon, Georgia
- WPGF-LD in Memphis, Tennessee
