= WAND (TV) =

Television station in Decatur, Illinois

- Decatur–Springfield–; Champaign–Urbana, Illinois; United States
- City: Decatur, Illinois
- Channels: Digital: 20 (UHF); Virtual: 17
- Branding: WAND; WAND News

Programming
- Affiliations: 17.1: NBC; for others, see § Subchannels

Ownership
- Owner: Gray Media; (Gray Television Licensee, LLC)
- Sister stations: WBXC-CD

History
- First air date: August 16, 1953
- Former call signs: WTVP (1953–1966)
- Former channel numbers: Analog: 17 (UHF, 1953–2009); Digital: 18 (UHF, 2002–2011), 17 (UHF, 2011–2020)
- Former affiliations: ABC (1953–2005); DuMont (1953–1955)
- Call sign meaning: None known (Note: A child on a station tour once suggested that it should stand for "Weather and News Daily", though that was not the actual meaning.)

Technical information
- Licensing authority: FCC
- Facility ID: 70852
- ERP: 1,000 kW
- HAAT: 390.5 m (1,281 ft)
- Transmitter coordinates: 39°57′8.6″N 88°49′56.6″W
- Translator(s): see § Translators

Links
- Public license information: Public file; LMS
- Website: www.wandtv.com

WAND (channel 17) is a television station licensed to Decatur, Illinois, United States, serving the Central Illinois region as an affiliate of NBC. It is owned by Gray Media alongside WBXC-CD (channel 18). WAND's studios are located on South Side Drive in Decatur, and its transmitter is located along I-72, between Oreana and Argenta.

Channel 17 was the first station built in the market, signing on as WTVP on August 16, 1953. Originally an affiliate of ABC, it was owned by local non-broadcast investors and struggled due to its impaired reach. Investments were made in facilities and programming under Metromedia in the early 1960s, but it was as the first television station property owned by LIN Broadcasting that the station activated a more powerful transmitter facility and changed its call sign to WAND in 1966. The tower collapsed in a 1978 ice storm and was not rebuilt for more than a year, hindering the station's reach. LIN sold majority ownership to Block Communications in 2000, but it continued to operate the station until Block purchased the remainder in 2007. During that time, WAND switched affiliations from ABC to NBC as part of a new group affiliation agreement between LIN and NBC. Gray Media acquired Block's television stations in 2026.

As the station's media market is spread out among several stations in different cities, the station's news ratings strength is concentrated within Decatur and Macon County, with lesser figures in the areas of Springfield and Champaign–Urbana.

== History ==
=== WTVP: Early years ===
Decatur was assigned ultra high frequency (UHF) channels 17 and 23 when the Federal Communications Commission (FCC) lifted its four-year freeze on TV station grants in 1952. While Decatur radio stations WSOY and WDZ announced plans to apply, neither had done so by October 1952, when the Prairie Television Company applied for channel 17. Its president was W. L. Shellabarger, who had previously led a soy mill company. The commission quickly issued Prairie a construction permit on November 20, and the station shortly after took the call sign WTVP.

Construction began on a facility south of the city along the Sangamon River, including an interim transmitter facility (a 1-kilowatt transmitter was all that was available, leaving a 10-kilowatt unit to be installed at a later date). Fabrication of the station's transmitting antenna had become the principal obstacle to going on the air by the start of July, with eight changes in the promised shipping date from the manufacturer, RCA. Even while construction was drawing to a close, issues were emerging involving another station planning to get on the air: WCIA (channel 3) of Champaign, which had hoped to move its transmitter slightly to the east and improve its coverage of Decatur. WTVP contended that WCIA's proposed relocation had hampered its efforts to obtain a network affiliation, even though it had announced plans months earlier to affiliate with CBS, WCIA-TV wound up with that affiliation.

The antenna arrived in Decatur and was erected on August 2; 10,000 people turned out at the studios for a previously scheduled open house and to see the antenna hoisted atop the 550 feet (170 m) tower. The first test pattern went out two days later, and WTVP began telecasting on August 16, 1953. The station was a primary affiliate of ABC, though in the first months, programming from all the major networks—ABC, CBS, NBC, and DuMont Television Network—was shown.

Months after going on the air, the station was roiled by a management crisis. The station did not sign on as scheduled on January 20, 1954. Soon afterward, it emerged that three executives—general manager Harold Cowgill, chief engineer James Wulliman, and program director Paul Taff—had resigned instead of complying with an ultimatum from principal owner Shellabarger. Station stockholders sought to cut expenses by reducing staff and reassigning job duties. The station did not return to the air until that evening; even then, it could only air the audio portion of the Backstage for Polio benefit concert. Normal operations resumed the following afternoon. A total of 20 employees resigned, all of them identically claiming "an unstable administrative situation" and "proposed changes in program policy". At the time, the station had 47 employees, more than double the number of staffers employed by WCIA and WICS in Springfield and three times as many as WBLN in Bloomington. One of the departing executives, Cowgill, went as far as to announce his intention to apply for channel 23 so as to compete with WTVP.

WTVP also had to contend with the uneven structure of television in Central Illinois. WCIA, as a very high frequency (VHF) station, had a larger coverage area, better ratings, and more advertiser support than WTVP, WICS, or other UHF outlets. Shortly after WTVP and WICS failed at the end of 1957 in their joint bid to force WCIA to move to a UHF channel, in April 1958, Shellabarger sold controlling interest in the station to a group of Chicago businessmen fronted by advertising executive George Bolas. Several members of the Swanson family were also represented in the ownership.

=== Metromedia ownership ===
In January 1960, Prairie Television announced the sale of the station to Metropolitan Broadcasting of New York City, which then renamed itself Metromedia in 1961. The $570,000 purchase of the station was a near-tripling of its value in two years.

Under Metromedia, some operations of the station were shared with WTVH in Peoria, including senior leadership. Metromedia purchased the first video tape recorder at a central Illinois TV station for WTVP in 1961. Metromedia also set about expanding WTVP's coverage area. It applied for and built a translator on channel 77 to extend its signal into the Champaign–Urbana area. It then worked to make the translator a moot point in 1964 by increasing power for channel 17, which had never operated at its full authorized effective radiated power since beginning broadcasting. The station had originally operated at 17,000 watts; successive increases had brought its authorized effective radiated power to 200,000 watts by January 1962.

=== WAND: LIN ownership ===
Metromedia grew rapidly during the time it owned WTVP, and it began to signal that it wanted to shed its Illinois stations in pursuit of larger markets. In March 1965, the company sold WTVH in Peoria to make room for the potential acquisition of a major-market UHF outlet. In October, it announced the $2 million sale of WTVP to LIN Broadcasting Company of Nashville, Tennessee; LIN operated four Southern radio stations and a series of cable television systems but no TV stations. As the WTVP sale awaited FCC approval, Metromedia was already negotiating to acquire KSAN-TV, a UHF station in San Francisco.

Nearly immediately after the FCC approved the transfer of ownership, LIN announced its plan for changes: a substantial power increase, increased local programming, and new call letters—WAND. The call sign changed on February 14, and other changes came throughout the year, including expanded news coverage. In July, ground was broken on a new 1,064-foot (324 m) tower and transmitting facility near Argenta, Illinois. It operated at 1.95 million watts, a nearly tenfold power increase from its predecessor. Though it was originally intended just to double channel 17's coverage area, after the new transmitter went online that October, reports of clear reception came from a larger area than anticipated. It also required some viewers in Decatur proper to buy a second antenna to clearly receive WAND alongside other stations.

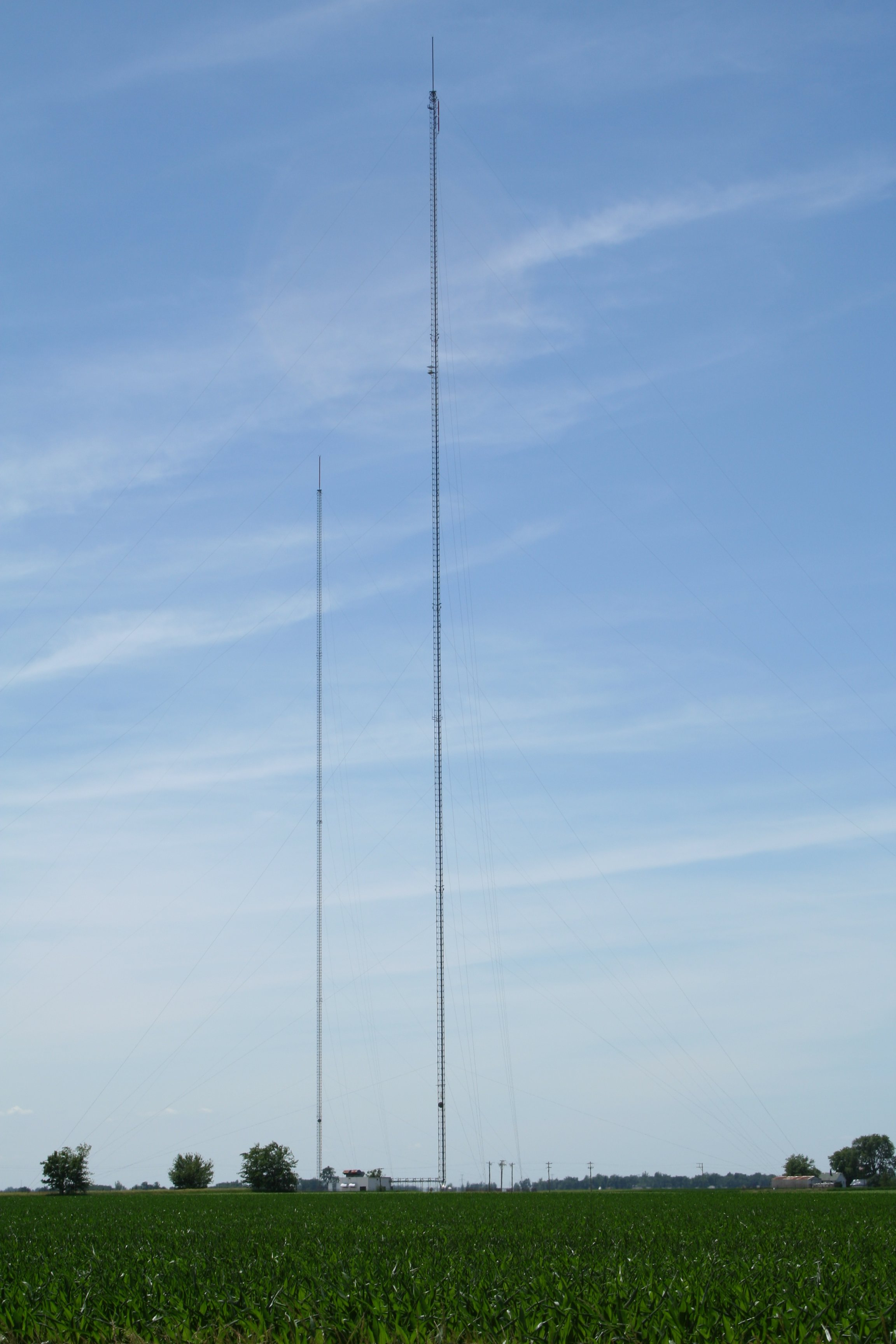
At right is the 400.5-meter (1,314.0 ft) WAND tower near Argenta, Illinois.

On March 26, 1978, WAND's tower was brought down by a massive ice storm, narrowly missing a house. All but 100 feet (30 m) of the tower fell down under the weight of massive sheets of ice. The lost tower was worth $1.5 million. To restore service, WAND prepared to reactivate its original tower behind its studios, which had been retained as a backup. A temporary antenna allowed the station to get back on the air on April 3. However, the shorter and less powerful transmitter did not reach the Champaign–Urbana area, so WAND temporarily relocated its translator at Danville to Champaign, meaning the former city would have to go without ABC programs for months while the Argenta tower was rebuilt. The tower was rebuilt at 1,314 feet (401 m) and activated in June 1979; the station increased its power to the UHF maximum of five million watts.

=== Block ownership; affiliation switch to NBC; sale to Gray Media ===
LIN wholly owned WAND until March 2000, when it sold 67 percent of the station to Block Communications in exchange for 100 percent of WLFI-TV in Lafayette, Indiana. However, LIN continued to own a third of WAND and operate the station as part of the deal and did not sell the remaining stake to Block until November 2007. The continued LIN connection would have a material impact. In 2004, NBC and LIN negotiated a new affiliation agreement that included clauses for switching two LIN-operated ABC affiliates to NBC: WAND and WDTN in Dayton, Ohio. At the time, NBC had higher ratings. As a result, on September 5, 2005, WAND became an NBC affiliate, with WICS/WICD switching to ABC.

On August 1, 2025, Gray Media announced it would acquire all of Block's broadcast television stations, including WAND, for $80 million. The sale was approved by the FCC on May 6, 2026, and completed the same day.

== News operation ==
Historically, the Champaign–Springfield–Decatur media market, fragmented between stations in multiple cities, has typically seen news viewership divided among city lines. This dynamic also holds for WAND. For instance, in November 1996, WAND's newscasts led all but one timeslot in a seven-county area around Decatur, with 25 percent of viewers in the region watching WAND's 6 p.m. newscast. However, in the full 20-county market, it was a distant third in all timeslots behind WCIA and WICS/WICD, with its 6 p.m. newscast only attracting 8.5 percent of the audience.

The 1990s were a decade of news department expansion at WAND. The station's only full-length newscasts were at 6 and 10 p.m. until 1992, when WAND debuted Live at Five, the second 5 p.m. newscast in the area. Its launch was brought forward by five months to cover a five-month strike against Caterpillar Inc. In late 1993, a Doppler weather radar was installed atop the station's building in Decatur; the purchase, made by LIN as part of a push to add radar at all of its stations, represented the first Doppler radar in the local area. The 20-minute Good Morning Central Illinois expanded to an hour in 1994. However, WAND was the last of the three major stations to only run an hour-long morning newscast as WCIA and WICS each extended their morning newscasts to start earlier than 6 a.m.

On January 27, 2014, WAND expanded its weekday noon broadcast to one hour. Weekend morning newscasts were introduced in 2018.

=== Notable current on-air staff ===
- Jim Kosek — meteorologist

=== Notable former on-air staff ===
- Grant Napear — sports anchor, 1984–1987
- Devin Scillian — reporter and anchor

== Technical information ==
=== Subchannels ===
WAND's transmitter is located along I-72, between Oreana and Argenta. The station's signal is multiplexed:

Subchannels of WAND
Subchannel	Res.	Short name	Programming
17.1	1080i	WAND HD	NBC
17.2	480i	COZI	Cozi TV
17.3	480i	ION	Ion
17.4	480i	IONPlus	Ion Plus
17.5	480i	COURTTV	Court TV
17.6	480i	MeTV	MeTV
55.3	480i	Antenna	Antenna TV (WRSP-TV)

Broadcast on behalf of another station

WAND hosts a subchannel of WRSP-TV and is in turn hosted in ATSC 3.0 (NextGen TV) as part of the market's ATSC 3.0 (NextGen TV) deployment, which launched in December 2022.

=== Analog-to-digital conversion ===
WAND shut down its analog signal, over UHF channel 17, on February 17, 2009, the original target digital television transition date. The station's digital signal remained on its pre-transition UHF channel 18, using virtual channel 17. On June 6, 2011, the FCC granted WAND a construction permit to move its digital frequency back to channel 17 with the UHF digital maximum power of one million watts.

WAND relocated its signal from channel 17 to channel 20 on January 17, 2020, as a result of the 2016 United States wireless spectrum auction.

=== Translators ===
In addition to its main signal, WAND can also be seen on three low-power translators:

- Danville: W23EQ-D
- Effingham: W33EK-D
- Jacksonville: W29ES-D

== See also ==
- Channel 20 digital TV stations in the United States
- Channel 17 virtual TV stations in the United States
