= Homer, Illinois =

Homer
- Village
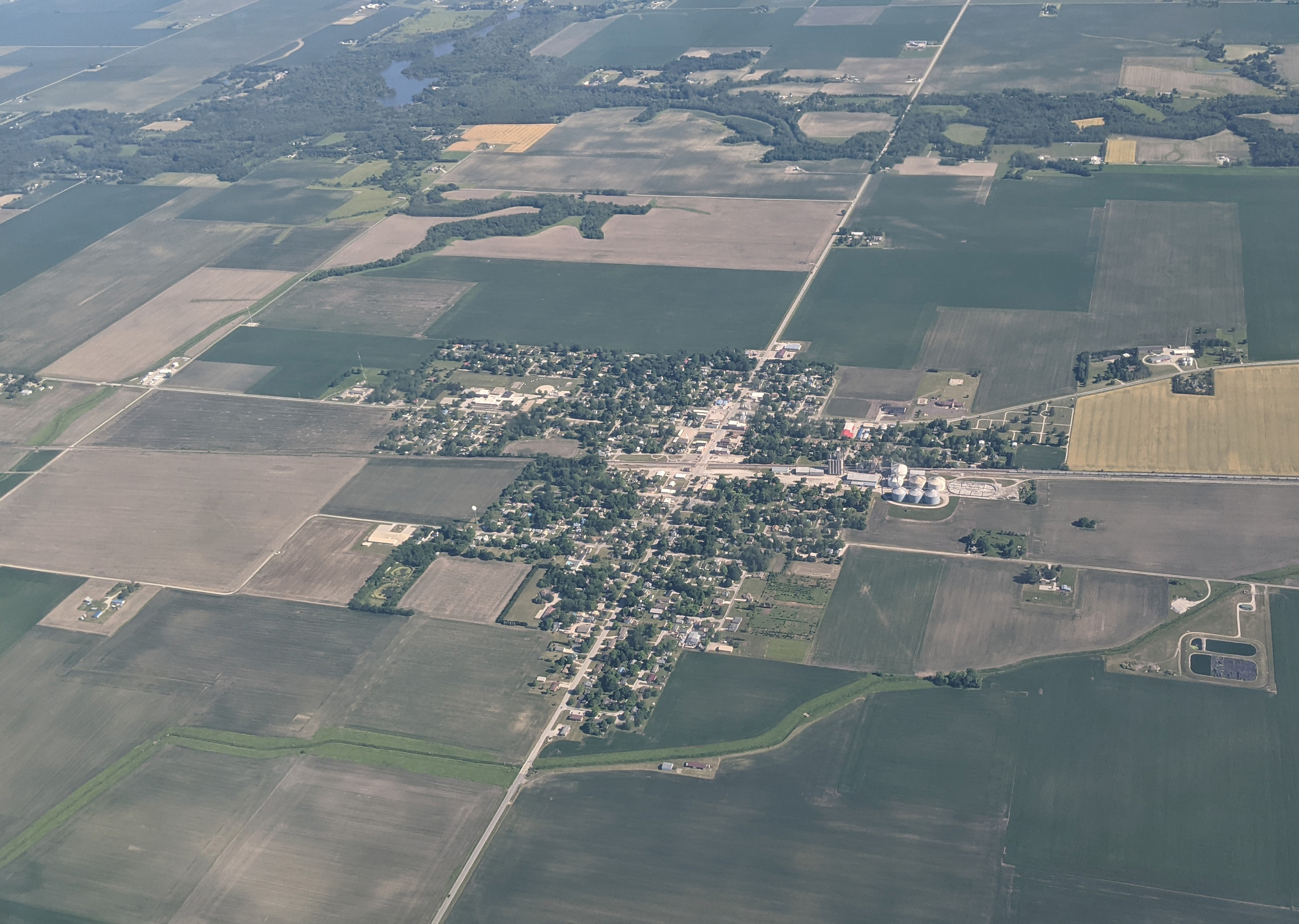
- Homer from the air, looking to the north

- Location of Homer in Champaign County, Illinois.

- Location within Champaign County Homer (Illinois)
- Coordinates: 40°01′59″N 87°57′28″W
- Country: United States
- State: Illinois
- County: Champaign
- Founded: 1855

Area
  - Total: 0.98 sq mi (2.54 km^{2})
  - Land: 0.98 sq mi (2.54 km^{2})
  - Water: 0 sq mi (0.00 km^{2})
- Elevation: 676 ft (206 m)

Population (2020)
  - Total: 1,073
  - Density: 1,095.2/sq mi (422.84/km^{2})
- Time zone: UTC-6 (CST)
  - Summer (DST): UTC-5 (CDT)
- Postal code: 61849
- Area code: 217
- FIPS code: 17-35814
- GNIS feature ID: 2398532
- Website: homervillage.com

Homer is a village in Champaign County, Illinois, United States. Its population was 1,073 at the 2020 census.

== History ==
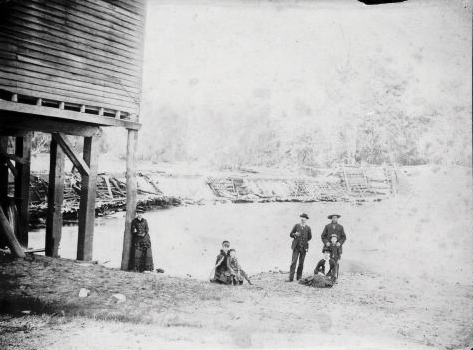
The mill and dam on the Salt Fork at Homer, Illinois. This photo of the Coffeen family was taken in the mid-1880s.

Homer grew from a settlement named Union, which was on the Fort Clark or State Road running between Danville and Urbana, nearly three miles north of the present town. Union was little more than several cabins built in 1829–30, but it served as a post office and meeting place in what was Vermilion County prior to the creation of Champaign County in 1833. Moses Thomas, a native of Pennsylvania, built a mill on the Salt Fork creek southeast of Union in 1834 and began to mill grain. A young merchant traveling from Indiana, Michael Doctor Coffeen, built a store adjacent to the mill, and with Thomas created the village of Homer on January 26, 1837. The post office was moved to Homer with M. D. Coffeen as postmaster in 1841.

Homer grew to 120 people in 1850, and the coming of the Great Western Railroad to the south of the town prompted the village to move to its present location. In February 1855, the town's 32 buildings were dragged 1.5 miles south by 18 teams of oxen. The village became a stop on the railway, later named the Wabash Railroad, becoming the center of agriculture in eastern Champaign County.

In 1905, the town became the location for Homer Park, an amusement park on the Illinois Traction System interurban line. Homer Park, north of the village on the Salt Fork creek, offered swimming, food, baseball, movies and even a small zoo. The park closed in 1937 after flooding and poor management.

Homer gained a telephone exchange in 1899 under the management of J. G. White. The Homer Enterprise reported on October 25th 1899 that "Dr. G. L. Williamson, who is always quick to take advantage of modern methods and the latest practical way of doing things, was the first subscriber to the White Telephone Exchange. The doctor took a phone first, because he believed the telephone would be beneficial to his business. And now since he is receiving from one to five calls for professional services over the phone daily and as high as three in one night, he feels that he did not err in his judgment. What the telephone had done for the doctor, it will do for all other lines of business in Homer. The telephone is not only a great labor and time saver, but a business bringer as well. No business man should think of doing without one." In 1906 White sold the exchange to the Douglas Telephone Company.

Homer Brick and Tile Works and a tobacco factory helped the economy to flourish alongside the railroad.

The First National Bank, founded by Solomon Plaut, Henry J. Wiggins and Emanuel Fisher, in June 1883, became the Citizen's Bank in June, 1887 when Henry Wiggins bought out Plaut and Fisher.

Homer Lake

Six miles South of Homer lies Homer Lake. Homer Lake is a forest preserve and houses the original site of Homer Park and holds traces of the old town. The Champaign County Forest Preserve District began managing the land in 1971 and officially received ownership of the land in 1992.

Homer Lake is 814 acres of forest preserve surrounding a large lake known for hosting parties and camps in the Walnut Hill Shelter, Salt Fork Center, and the Interpretive Center at the entrance of the park. The Salt Fork River feeds into the lake which allows for boating of all types. The park hosts outdoor schools, camps, fishing tournaments and various other outings.

The park is currently working to restore habitats throughout the park.

=== Teachers strike ===
The Homer School District, which served the village and the surrounding area, set a record for the longest teacher's strike in the nation's history, spanning from October 26, 1986, to June 23, 1987. At 156 days, the strike was more than twice as long as the second-longest, set by a school district near Cleveland, Ohio during the 2002–2003 school year. At issue throughout the negotiations was the salary formula, which the Chicago Tribune reported was "not likely to drastically change the pay rates of ... teachers." Other provisions included allowing teachers fired during the strike to be allowed to return with no loss of salary or seniority and the district's newly unionized support staff getting a 6 percent pay increase beginning July 1, and an additional 2 percent increase at the beginning of the 1988–1989 school year. Legal fees were estimated to be $150,000.

Although the strike lasted 156 days, students only lost 11 days of class time as strikebreaking teachers were hired to teach classes. However, some families moved from Homer or paid tuition to have their children attend neighboring schools. The Homer School District eventually consolidated with the Allerton-Broadlands-Longview School District (located to Homer's south), many of the teachers left and all but two school board members either did not seek re-election or were defeated in the first election after the settlement. The town suffered from the effects of the strike for many years, according to a 2006 article in The News Gazette of Champaign-Urbana.

== Geography ==
According to the 2021 census gazetteer files, Homer has a total area of 0.98 square miles (2.54 km^{2}), all land.

== Demographics ==
Historical population
Census	Pop.	Note	%±
1850	120		—
1870	767		—
1880	924		20.5%
1890	917		−0.8%
1900	1,080		17.8%
1910	1,086		0.6%
1920	978		−9.9%
1930	918		−6.1%
1940	983		7.1%
1950	1,030		4.8%
1960	1,276		23.9%
1970	1,354		6.1%
1980	1,279		−5.5%
1990	1,264		−1.2%
2000	1,200		−5.1%
2010	1,193		−0.6%
2020	1,073		−10.1%
U.S. Decennial Census

=== 2020 census ===
As of the 2020 census, Homer had a population of 1,073. The median age was 41.3 years. 21.2% of residents were under the age of 18 and 18.2% of residents were 65 years of age or older. For every 100 females there were 102.5 males, and for every 100 females age 18 and over there were 96.7 males age 18 and over.

There were 464 households in Homer, of which 29.7% had children under the age of 18 living in them. Of all households, 46.6% were married-couple households, 18.1% were households with a male householder and no spouse or partner present, and 27.4% were households with a female householder and no spouse or partner present. About 26.5% of all households were made up of individuals and 13.1% had someone living alone who was 65 years of age or older. There were 347 families residing in the village, with an average household size of 3.18 and an average family size of 2.54.

0.0% of residents lived in urban areas, while 100.0% lived in rural areas.

There were 509 housing units, of which 8.8% were vacant. The homeowner vacancy rate was 1.0% and the rental vacancy rate was 10.3%. The population density was 1,094.90 inhabitants per square mile (422.74/km^{2}). There were 509 housing units at an average density of 519.39 per square mile (200.54/km^{2}).

Racial composition as of the 2020 census
Race	Number	Percent
White	986	91.9%
Black or African American	2	0.2%
American Indian and Alaska Native	0	0.0%
Asian	9	0.8%
Native Hawaiian and Other Pacific Islander	0	0.0%
Some other race	5	0.5%
Two or more races	71	6.6%
Hispanic or Latino (of any race)	24	2.2%

=== Income and poverty ===
The median income for a household in the village was $65,347, and the median income for a family was $81,750. Males had a median income of $58,750 versus $22,059 for females. The per capita income for the village was $44,604. About 12.1% of families and 10.6% of the population were below the poverty line, including 16.0% of those under age 18 and 9.0% of those age 65 or over.

== Education ==
It is in the Heritage Community Unit School District 8.

The Heritage Community School District is the home of the Heritage Hawks. The high school previously co-oped with Villa Grove until the end of the co-op in 2020. Heritage is home of the Hawks and a well known music program led by Mr. Justin Lee. The elementary and middle school is housed in Homer with a portion of the original school house remaining as a gym and extra classrooms. The high school is South of Homer in the nearby town of Broadlands.

The pep band has previously been invited to Redbird Arena to perform as contest winners and have been featured many times in newspapers and news reports. In 2021, Heritage was named the winner of the Class D State Championships in the IHSA Music Sweepstakes. The enrollment at the time was less than 150 students. The Bass Choir has repeatedly performed at the National Level.

References

- Raymond Kelly Cunningham Jr. and Molly Shoaf. "From the Timber to the Prairie: A History of Homer Illinois Volume I."
