= Clear Lake Township, Sangamon County, Illinois =

Coordinates: 39°49′49″N 89°32′35″W

Clear Lake Township
- Township
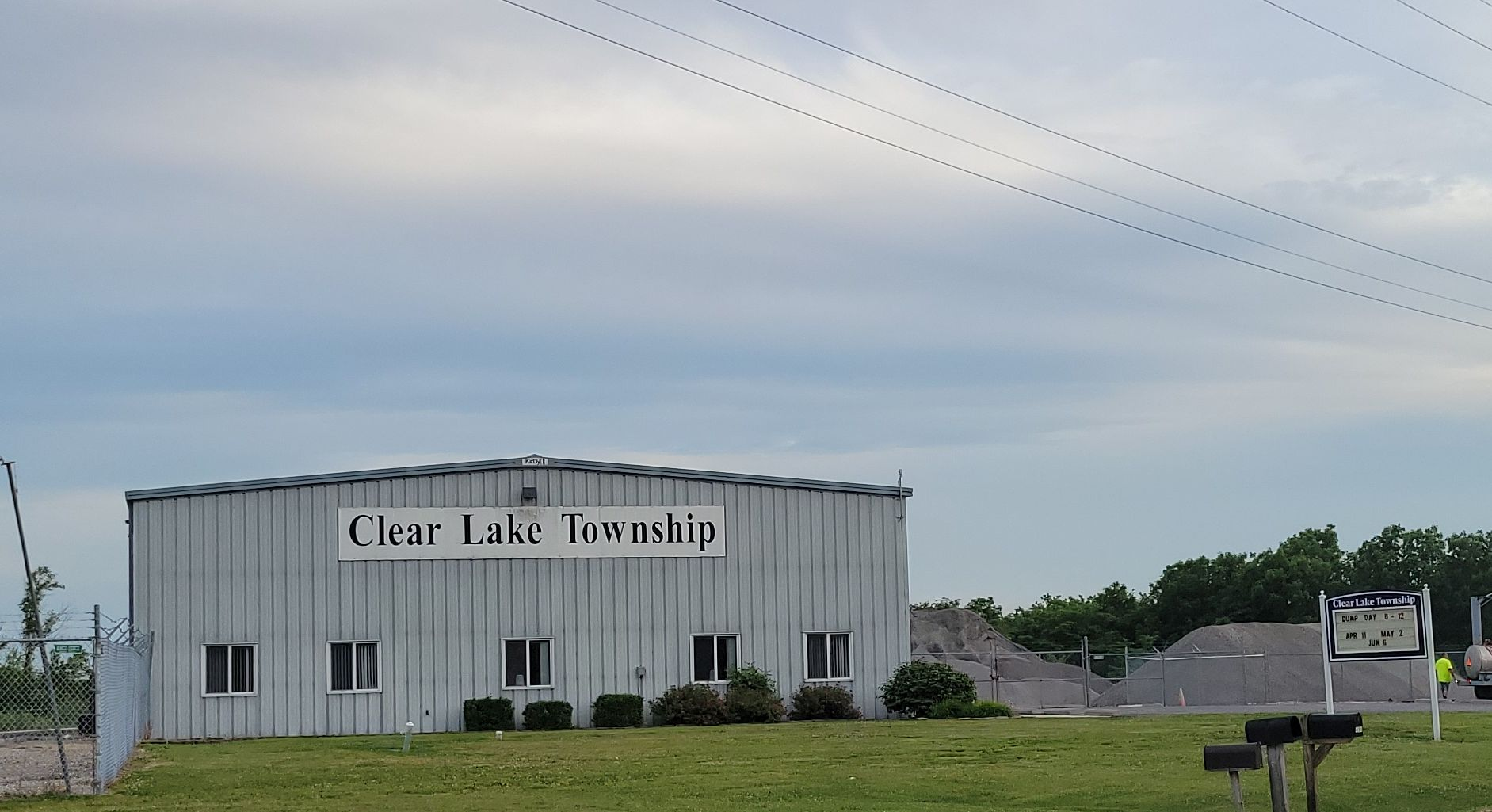
- Clear Lake Township government building near Clear Lake.

- Location in Sangamon County

- Sangamon County's location in Illinois
- Country: United States
- State: Illinois
- County: Sangamon
- Established: November 6, 1860

Area
  - Total: 34.57 sq mi (89.5 km^{2})
  - Land: 33.77 sq mi (87.5 km^{2})
  - Water: 0.81 sq mi (2.1 km^{2}) 2.34%

Population (2010)
  - Estimate (2016): 8,427
  - Density: 252.5/sq mi (97.5/km^{2})
- Time zone: UTC-6 (CST)
  - Summer (DST): UTC-5 (CDT)
- FIPS code: 17-167-14858

Clear Lake Township is located in Sangamon County, Illinois, United States. According to the 2010 census, its population was 8,527 and it contained 3,418 housing units.

== Geography ==
According to the 2010 census, the township has a total area of 34.57 square miles (89.5 km^{2}), of which 33.77 square miles (87.5 km^{2}) (or 97.69%) is land and 0.81 square miles (2.1 km^{2}) (or 2.34%) is water.

== Demographics ==
Historical population
Census	Pop.	Note	%±
2016 (est.)	8,427
U.S. Decennial Census
