= Duratrans =

Kodak large-format backlit color transparency film

Duratrans is a large-format backlit color transparency film invented by Eastman Kodak Co. in the late 1970s and trademarked in 1982. Kodak shortened the name of the material – Endura Transparency – to its current name. The original duratrans film was exposed photographically and developed using a silver halide process, similar to conventional lab photography.

Over time, the term has come to refer to any of a range of large format backlit graphic substrates, created in a variety of ways including photochemical and various types of inkjets.

== "Promotional" duratrans ==
The most common usage of duratrans is for the backlit graphic film used for promotional advertising displays in shopping malls, airports, casinos, movie theaters, restaurants, retail stores, and trade show exhibit halls. The finished film is inserted into a display lightbox which illuminates it.

== "Fine Art" duratrans ==
The distinction between promotional and fine art duratrans is purely in the subject matter of the artwork imaged onto the duratrans film. There is no other defining difference, except that possibly a fine art duratrans may be processed using higher resolutions, color depths, and/or other fabrication tolerances to effect a higher-precision result, for a more-demanding audience.

== "Translite" duratrans ==
Another popular application of duratrans is as a photo backdrop in television news sets and theater designs. These duratrans, a.k.a. translites, are most often used to create the backgrounds that appear behind news presenters or anchors. In theatre the backgrounds are positioned behind the actors, actresses, and other talent respectively.

Translites can range from 15 to more than 100 feet long and 12 to 40 feet tall. The image is printed or painted on a translucent material such as polyester or a plastic sheet. This is then stretched vertically over an opening in the set's backwall which is designed to support it. Translites are lit from behind using lights mounted perpendicular to the floor in the space between the set and studio wall, illuminating the translite image and adding to the illusion of depth.

Translites are created by printing photographic images or computer-rendered images onto the material using large-format printers. Many existing translites have been created in a photographic darkroom by a mural enlarger projecting onto a strip of film up to 32 feet (9.8 m) wide. These pieces are assembled into the final size by seaming. A matte lacquer is often added to dull the finish, to mitigate stage lighting reflections.

Translites for television news sets often contain photographs of city skylines, landscapes, the logos for the station and its network affiliation, control rooms, and abstract designs. Set areas designed for sports and weather portions of the newscasts contain weather, sports, and team logo imagery.

== See also ==
- Inkjet printing
- Point of sale display
- Set construction
- Wide-format printer
