= List of television stations in Alaska =

This is a list of broadcast television stations that are licensed in the U.S. state of Alaska.

== Full-power ==
- Stations are arranged by media market served and channel position.

Full-power television stations in Alaska
Media market	Station	Channel	Primary affiliation(s)	Notes	Refs
Anchorage	KTUU-TV	2	NBC, CBS on 5.11		
Anchorage	KTBY	4	Fox, Ion Television on 4.5		
Anchorage	KAUU	5	CBS, MyNetworkTV on 5.4		
Anchorage	KAKM	7	PBS		
Anchorage	KTVA	11	PBS	(Note: Local satellite of KAKM.)	
Anchorage	KYUR	13	ABC, The CW on 13.2, Fox on 13.3		
Anchorage	KDMD	33	Ion Television		
Fairbanks	KATN	2	ABC, Fox on 2.2, The CW on 2.3, Ion Television on 2.4		
Fairbanks	KJNP-TV	4	TBN	(Note: Licensed to North Pole, Alaska.)	
Fairbanks	KUAC-TV	9	PBS		
Fairbanks	KTVF	11	NBC, MyNetworkTV on 11.2, CBS on 11.3		
Juneau	KTOO-TV	3	PBS	(Note: Satellite of KAKM.)	
Juneau	KJUD	8	ABC, The CW on 8.2, Fox on 8.3		
Sitka–Ketchikan	KTNL-TV	7	CBS		
Sitka–Ketchikan	KUBD	13	CBS	(Note: Satellite of KTNL-TV.)	

== Low-power ==
Low-power television stations in Alaska
Media market	Station	Channel	Primary affiliation(s)	Notes	Refs
Anchorage	K03GL-D	3	ARCS, PBS on 3.2	(Note: Licensed to King Mountain, etc., Alaska.)	
Anchorage	KYES-LD	5	CBS, NBC on 2.11, MyNetworkTV on 5.14		
Anchorage	KNIK-LD	6	Silent		
Anchorage	KLDY-LD	31	Various		
Anchorage	KCFT-CD	35	Religious independent		
Anchorage	KACN-LD	38	Silent		
Fairbanks	KFXF-LD	7	MyNetworkTV, CBS on 7.2		
Juneau	KATH-LD	2	NBC		
Juneau	KYEX-LD	5	CBS		
Juneau	K06QP-D	6	[Blank]		
Rural Alaska	KYUK-LD	15	PBS, ARCS on 15.2	(Note: Licensed to Bethel, Alaska.)	
Rural Alaska	K17ME-D	17	[Blank]		

== Translators ==
Television station translators in Alaska
Media market	Station	Channel	Translating	Notes	Refs
Anchorage	K24AG-D	24	K03GL-D	(Note: Licensed to Trapper Creek, Alaska.)	
Anchorage	KBLT-LD	31	KLDY-LD		
Anchorage	K25QK-D	33	KDMD		
Fairbanks	K13KU-D	2	KATN	(Note: Licensed to Delta Junction, Alaska.)	
Fairbanks	K04RP-D	9	KUAC-TV		
Fairbanks	K08OV-D	9	KUAC-TV	(Note: Licensed to Nenana, Alaska.)	
Fairbanks	K13AAE-D	9	KUAC-TV	(Note: Licensed to Healy, Alaska.)	
Fairbanks	K11WZ-D	11	KTVF		
Fairbanks	K12RF-D	11	KTVF		
Juneau	K04MR-D	4	K03GL-D	(Note: Licensed to Gustavus, Alaska.)	
Juneau	K04LB-D	4	K03GL-D	(Note: Licensed to Pelican, Alaska.)	
Juneau	K13OC-D	8	KJUD	(Note: Licensed to Douglas, etc., Alaska.)	
Juneau	K09TK-D	9	K03GL-D	(Note: Licensed to Elfin Cove, Alaska.)	
Juneau	K10KG-D	10	K03GL-D	(Note: Licensed to Tenakee Springs, Alaska.)	
Juneau	K11QE-D	11	K03GL-D	(Note: Licensed to Skagway, Alaska.)	
Kenai Peninsula	K12MM-D	2	KYES-LD	(Note: Licensed to Girdwood, Alaska.)	
Kenai Peninsula	K08PN-D	2	KYES-LD	(Note: Licensed to Homer, Alaska.)	
Kenai Peninsula	K23OE-D	2	KYES-LD	(Note: Licensed to Kasilof, Alaska.)	
Kenai Peninsula	K10NC-D	2	KYES-LD	(Note: Licensed to Kenai, Alaska.)	
Kenai Peninsula	K27AI-D	2	KYES-LD	(Note: Licensed to Ninilchik, Alaska.)	
Kenai Peninsula	K04JH-D	4	KTBY		
Kenai Peninsula	K08KA-D	4	KTBY		
Kenai Peninsula	K09QH-D	4	KTBY		
Kenai Peninsula	K31MD-D	4	KTBY		
Kenai Peninsula	K33AF-D	4	KTBY		
Kenai Peninsula	K05FW-D	7	KAKM		
Kenai Peninsula	K25PI-D	7	KAKM		
Kenai Peninsula	K12LA-D	7	KAKM		
Kenai Peninsula	K21AM-D	7	KAKM		
Kenai Peninsula	K07PG-D	7	[Blank]	(Note: Licensed to Seward, Alaska.)	
Kenai Peninsula	K07PF-D	7	KAKM		
Kenai Peninsula	K08KO-D	8	K03GL-D	(Note: Licensed to Cooper Landing, Alaska.)	
Kenai Peninsula	K13TR-D	13	KYUR		
Kenai Peninsula	K35NZ-D	13	KYUR		
Kenai Peninsula	K03FW-D	13	KYUR		
Kenai Peninsula	K15AP-D	15	K03GL-D	(Note: Licensed to Moose Pass, Alaska.)	
Kenai Peninsula	K17OX-D	17	K07PG-D		
Rural Alaska	K02LJ-D	2	K03GL-D	(Note: Licensed to Nondalton, Alaska.)	
Rural Alaska	K03GA-D	3	K03GL-D	(Note: Licensed to Elim, Alaska.)	
Rural Alaska	K09QX-D	3	K03GL-D	(Note: Licensed to St. Michael, Alaska.)	
Rural Alaska	K04LZ-D	4	K03GL-D	(Note: Licensed to Galena, Alaska.)	
Rural Alaska	K04MT-D	4	K03GL-D	(Note: Licensed to Newtok, Alaska.)	
Rural Alaska	K04KP-D	4	K03GL-D	(Note: Licensed to Northway, Alaska.)	
Rural Alaska	K04JF-D	4	K03GL-D	(Note: Licensed to Nulato, Alaska.)	
Rural Alaska	K04KV-D	4	K03GL-D	(Note: Licensed to Unalaska, Alaska.)	
Rural Alaska	K04MN-D	4	K03GL-D	(Note: Licensed to Wales, Alaska.)	
Rural Alaska	K07OL-D	7	K03GL-D	(Note: Licensed to Kipnuk, Alaska.)	
Rural Alaska	K07QD-D	7	K03GL-D	(Note: Licensed to Hooper Bay, Alaska.)	
Rural Alaska	K07QX-D	7	K03GL-D	(Note: Licensed to Golovin, Alaska.)	
Rural Alaska	K07RB-D	7	K03GL-D	(Note: Licensed to Tanana, Alaska.)	
Rural Alaska	K07RD-D	7	K03GL-D	(Note: Licensed to Savoonga, Alaska.)	
Rural Alaska	K07RJ-D	7	K03GL-D	(Note: Licensed to Holy Cross, Alaska.)	
Rural Alaska	K07RK-D	7	K03GL-D	(Note: Licensed to St. Mary's, Alaska.)	
Rural Alaska	K07RU-D	7	K03GL-D	(Note: Licensed to Dot Lake, Alaska.)	
Rural Alaska	K07RY-D	7	K03GL-D	(Note: Licensed to Chignik, Alaska.)	
Rural Alaska	K07ST-D	7	K03GL-D	(Note: Licensed to Womens Bay, Alaska.)	
Rural Alaska	K07TH-D	7	K03GL-D	(Note: Licensed to Lime Village, Alaska.)	
Rural Alaska	K07TK-D	7	K03GL-D	(Note: Licensed to Marshall, Alaska.)	
Rural Alaska	K08HU-D	8	K03GL-D	(Note: Licensed to Aleknagik, Alaska.)	
Rural Alaska	K08KD-D	8	K03GL-D	(Note: Licensed to Alakanuk, Alaska.)	
Rural Alaska	KUCB-LD	8	[Blank]	(Note: Licensed to Dutch Harbor, Alaska.)	
Rural Alaska	K09NH-D	9	K03GL-D	(Note: Licensed to Shungnak, Alaska.)	
Rural Alaska	K09NI-D	9	K03GL-D	(Note: Licensed to Mekoryuk, Alaska.)	
Rural Alaska	K09NK-D	9	K03GL-D	(Note: Licensed to Perryville, Alaska.)	
Rural Alaska	K09NO-D	9	K03GL-D	(Note: Licensed to Pilot Point, Alaska.)	
Rural Alaska	K09OT-D	9	K03GL-D	(Note: Licensed to Valdez, Alaska.)	
Rural Alaska	K09OV-D	9	K03GL-D	(Note: Licensed to Kotzebue, Alaska.)	
Rural Alaska	K09OW-D	9	K03GL-D	(Note: Licensed to Nome, Alaska.)	
Rural Alaska	K09PC-D	9	K03GL-D	(Note: Licensed to Grayling, Alaska.)	
Rural Alaska	K09PO-D	9	K03GL-D	(Note: Licensed to Chevak, Alaska.)	
Rural Alaska	K09QC-D	9	K03GL-D	(Note: Licensed to McGrath, Alaska.)	
Rural Alaska	K09QG-D	9	K03GL-D	(Note: Licensed to Chalkyitsik, Alaska.)	
Rural Alaska	K09QK-D	9	K03GL-D		
Rural Alaska	K09QM-D	9	K03GL-D	(Note: Licensed to Nelson Lagoon, Alaska.)	
Rural Alaska	K09QR-D	9	K03GL-D	(Note: Licensed to Gambell, Alaska.)	
Rural Alaska	K09QU-D	9	K03GL-D	(Note: Licensed to Togiak, Alaska.)	
Rural Alaska	K09QW-D	9	K03GL-D	(Note: Licensed to King Cove, Alaska.)	
Rural Alaska	K09RA-D	9	K03GL-D	(Note: Licensed to Sand Point, Alaska.)	
Rural Alaska	K09RB-D	9	K03GL-D	(Note: Licensed to St. Paul, Alaska.)	
Rural Alaska	K09RC-D	9	K03GL-D	(Note: Licensed to Unalakleet, Alaska.)	
Rural Alaska	K09RE-D	9	K03GL-D	(Note: Licensed to St. George, Alaska.)	
Rural Alaska	K09RF-D	9	K03GL-D	(Note: Licensed to Eagle Village, Alaska.)	
Rural Alaska	K09RP-D	9	K03GL-D	(Note: Licensed to False Pass, Alaska.)	
Rural Alaska	K09SA-D	9	K03GL-D	(Note: Licensed to Koyuk, Alaska.)	
Rural Alaska	K09SG-D	9	K03GL-D	(Note: Licensed to Goodnews Bay, Alaska.)	
Rural Alaska	K09SL-D	9	K03GL-D	(Note: Licensed to Kotlik, Alaska.)	
Rural Alaska	K09SP-D	9	K03GL-D	(Note: Licensed to Igiugig, Alaska.)	
Rural Alaska	K09SR-D	9	K03GL-D	(Note: Licensed to Port Lions, Alaska.)	
Rural Alaska	K09TT-D	9	K03GL-D	(Note: Licensed to Circle, Alaska.)	
Rural Alaska	K09TR-D	9	K03GL-D	(Note: Licensed to Lower and Upper Kalskag, Alaska.)	
Rural Alaska	K09TW-D	9	K03GL-D	(Note: Licensed to Venetie, Alaska.)	
Rural Alaska	K09TX-D	9	K03GL-D	(Note: Licensed to Kaltag, Alaska.)	
Rural Alaska	K10KH-D	10	K03GL-D	(Note: Licensed to Shageluk, Alaska.)	
Rural Alaska	K10LJ-D	10	K03GL-D		
Rural Alaska	K10LU-D	10	K03GL-D	(Note: Licensed to Nightmute, Alaska.)	
Rural Alaska	K11QG-D	11	K03GL-D	(Note: Licensed to Toksook Bay, Alaska.)	
Rural Alaska	K11QI-D	11	K03GL-D	(Note: Licensed to Ambler, Alaska.)	
Rural Alaska	K11QY-D	11	K03GL-D	(Note: Licensed to Kwethluk, Alaska.)	
Rural Alaska	K12MD-D	12	K03GL-D	(Note: Licensed to Sleetmute, Alaska.)	
Rural Alaska	K13RN-D	13	K03GL-D	(Note: Licensed to Old Harbor, Alaska.)	
Rural Alaska	K13RR-D	13	K03GL-D	(Note: Licensed to Tok, Alaska.)	
Rural Alaska	K13SA-D	13	K03GL-D	(Note: Licensed to Port Heiden, Alaska.)	
Rural Alaska	K13SE-D	13	K03GL-D	(Note: Licensed to Stony River, Alaska.)	
Rural Alaska	K13SM-D	13	K03GL-D	(Note: Licensed to Slana, Alaska.)	
Rural Alaska	K13SV-D	13	K03GL-D	(Note: Licensed to Pedro Bay, Alaska.)	
Rural Alaska	K13SY-D	13	K03GL-D	(Note: Licensed to Birch Creek, Alaska.)	
Rural Alaska	K13TD-D	13	K03GL-D	(Note: Licensed to White Mountain, Alaska.)	
Rural Alaska	K13TE-D	13	K03GL-D	(Note: Licensed to Bettles, Alaska.)	
Rural Alaska	K13TJ-D	13	K03GL-D	(Note: Licensed to Mountain Village, Alaska.)	
Rural Alaska	K13TN-D	13	K03GL-D	(Note: Licensed to Manley Hot Springs, Alaska.)	
Rural Alaska	K13UO-D	13	K03GL-D	(Note: Licensed to Cold Bay, Alaska.)	
Rural Alaska	K13UV-D	13	K03GL-D	(Note: Licensed to Napakiak, Alaska.)	
Rural Alaska	K15AT-D	15	K03GL-D	(Note: Licensed to Kodiak, Alaska.)	
Rural Alaska	K15AU-D	15	K03GL-D	(Note: Licensed to Pilot Station, Alaska.)	
Sitka–Ketchikan	K09AAD-D	3	KAKM		
Sitka–Ketchikan	K04MM-D	4	K03GL-D	(Note: Licensed to Hyder, Alaska.)	
Sitka–Ketchikan	KSCT-LD	5	KATH-LD		
Sitka–Ketchikan	K07SS-D	7	K03GL-D	(Note: Licensed to Angoon, Alaska.)	
Sitka–Ketchikan	K09QP-D	9	K03GL-D	(Note: Licensed to Kake, Alaska.)	
Sitka–Ketchikan	K15AF-D	15	K03GL-D	(Note: Licensed to Petersburg, Alaska.)	

== Microwave service ==
- Alaska Rural Communications Service

== Defunct ==
- KATV Ketchikan (cable service, 1953–1983)
- KFYF Fairbanks (1992–2017)
- KNOM-TV Nome (1956–1963)
- KSA-TV Sitka (cable service, 1959–1983)
- KYUK-TV Bethel (1972–2009)
