= NBC 2 =

NBC 2 may refer to one of the following television stations in the United States:

== Current ==
- KATH-LD in Juneau, Alaska
- KJRH-TV, Tulsa, Oklahoma
- KPRC-TV, Houston, Texas
- KNAZ-TV, Flagstaff, Arizona
- KNOP-TV, North Platte, Nebraska
- KOTI, Klamath Falls, Oregon
- KSNC, Great Bend, Kansas
  - Re-broadcasts KSNW in Wichita, Kansas
- KTUU-TV, Anchorage, Alaska
- KUBD in Ketchikan, Alaska
- WCBD-TV, Charleston, South Carolina
- WDTN, Dayton, Ohio
- WESH, Orlando, Florida
- WGRZ, Buffalo, New York
- WKAQ-DT3, a digital subchannel of WKAQ-TV in San Juan, Puerto Rico (O&O)
- WKTV, Utica, New York
- WLBZ, Bangor, Maine
- WTWO, Terre Haute, Indiana

== Former ==
- K07ZK/KOTR-LP (now KOTR-LD), Monterey, California (2006)
  - Was a translator of KSBW in Monterey, California (1955–1996)
- KATN, Fairbanks, Alaska (1955–1996)
- KHBC-TV (now KSIX-TV), Hilo, Hawaii (1996–2009)
  - Was a re-broadcast of KHNL in Honolulu, Hawaii (1952–1996)
- KHON-TV, Honolulu, Hawaii (1952 to 1996)
- KJWY, Jackson, Wyoming (now WDPN-TV in Wilmington, Delaware; affiliated with NBC (1996–2009)
- KLRJ-TV/KORK-TV (now KSNV), Las Vegas, Nevada (was on channel 2 1955–1967)
- KMID (TV), Midland, Texas (1953–1982)
- KTWO-TV, Casper, Wyoming (1957–2003)
- KUTV, Salt Lake City, Utah (1960–1995)
- WBBH-TV, Fort Myers / Naples, Florida (broadcasts on channel 20; was branded as NBC 2 1994–2025)
- WBRZ-TV, Baton Rouge, Louisiana (1955–1977)
- WMAR, Baltimore, Maryland (1981–1995)
- WSB-TV, Atlanta, Georgia (1948–1980)
