= Channel 11 low-power TV stations in the United States =

The following low-power television stations broadcast on digital or analog channel 11 in the United States:

- K10OA-D in Terrace Lakes, Idaho
- K11AT-D in Gunnison, Colorado
- K11BD-D in Leadore, Idaho
- K11BM-D in Methow, Washington
- K11BX-D in Sutherlin, Oregon
- K11CN-D in Caliente, Nevada
- K11CP-D in Fish Creek, Idaho
- K11CQ-D in Cedar City, Utah
- DDK11CS-D in Rock Island, Washington
- K11DL-D in Juliaetta, Idaho
- K11ED-D in Ruth, Nevada
- K11EE-D in Ely & McGill, Nevada
- K11EV-D in Grants, etc., New Mexico
- K11EZ-D in Cashmere, Washington
- K11FF-D in Superior, Montana
- K11FJ-D in Squilchuck St. Park, Washington
- K11FQ-D in Thompson Falls, Montana
- K11GH-D in Tri Cities, etc., Oregon
- K11GT-D in Eugene, Oregon
- K11GX-D in Whitewater, Montana
- K11HE-D in Jordan, etc., Montana
- K11HM-D in Bonners Ferry, Idaho
- K11HO-D in Polson, Montana
- K11IA-D in Glasgow, Montana
- K11IH-D in Malta, Montana
- K11IL-D in Bitterroot Range, etc., Montana
- K11IV-D in Pioche, Nevada
- K11IY-D in Battle Mountain, Nevada
- K11JP-D in Plains-Paradise, Montana
- K11KE-D in Woods Bay, Montana
- K11KI-D in Dorena, etc., Oregon
- K11KO-D in Kamiah, Idaho
- K11KP-D in Troy, Montana
- K11LA-D in Basin, Montana
- K11LC-D in Prescott, Arizona
- K11LM-D in Thomasville, Colorado
- K11LP-D in Cortez, Colorado
- K11MP-D in White Sulphur Springs, Montana
- K11OO-D in Pine Valley, etc., Utah
- K11OW-D in Ursine, Nevada
- K11PB-D in Cambridge, Idaho
- K11PP-D in Dingle, etc., Idaho
- K11PS-D in Collbran, Colorado
- K11QE-D in Skagway, Alaska
- K11QG-D in Toksook Bay, Alaska
- K11QI-D in Ambler, Alaska
- K11QQ-D in Hildale, etc., Utah
- K11QY-D in Kwethluk, Alaska
- K11RN-D in Douglas, Wyoming
- K11RX-D in Big Arm, Montana
- K11SZ-D in Oakridge, Oregon
- K11TJ-D in Sargents, Colorado
- K11TY-D in Salmon, Idaho
- K11UN-D in Coolin, Idaho
- K11UU-D in Pago Pago, American Samoa
- K11UW-D in Akron, Colorado
- K11VI-D in Elkton, Oregon
- K11VY-D in Toquerville, Utah
- K11WF-D in Mink Creek, Idaho
- K11WJ in Paris, Texas
- K11WK-D in Stanford, Montana
- K11WM-D in Townsend, Montana
- K11WQ-D in West Knees, Montana
- K11WR-D in Council, Idaho
- K11WT-D in McCall, Idaho
- K11WY-D in Coulee City, Washington
- K11WZ-D in Delta Junction, etc., Alaska
- K11XB-D in Long Valley Junction, Utah
- K11XC-D in Salina & Redmond, Utah
- K11XD-D in Rural Juab, etc., Utah
- K11XE-D in Marysvale, Utah
- K11XF-D in Woodland, Utah
- K11XG-D in Logan, Utah
- K11XH-D in Blanding/Monticello, Utah
- K11XI-D in Beaver etc., Utah
- K11XK-D in Helper, Utah
- K11XL-D in Roosevelt, etc., Utah
- K11XM-D in East Price, Utah
- K11XP-D in Boise, Idaho
- K11XS-D in Modesto, California
- K11XU-D in El Centro, California
- K21KJ-D in Mineral Wells, Texas
- KIIT-CA in North Platte, Nebraska
- KJST-LD in McAllen, Texas
- KKRM-LD in Chico, California
- KPJC-LD in San Francisco, California
- KSBK-LD in Colorado Springs, Colorado
- KTVF in Fairbanks, Alaska
- KUVN-CD in Fort Worth, Texas
- KVHC-LD in Kerrville, Texas
- KWTC-LD in Kerrville, Texas
- KWVT-LD in Salem, Oregon
- W11AJ-D in Franklin, North Carolina
- W11AN-D in Bryson City, North Carolina
- W11DH-D in Wabasso, Florida
- W11DM-D in Collegedale, Tennessee
- W11DR-D in Wilmington, North Carolina
- WDFL-LD in Miami, Florida
- WDNZ-LD in Glasgow, Kentucky
- WJDP-LD in Pigeon Forge, Tennessee
- WJKF-CD in Jacksonville, Florida
- WNIB-LD in Rochester, New York
- WOPI-CD in Bristol, Virginia/Kingsport, Tennessee
- WPNY-LD in Utica, etc., New York
- WTNC-LD in Durham, North Carolina
- WTZT-CD in Athens, Alabama
- WUEO-LD in Macon, Georgia
- WVTT-CD in Olean, New York
- WYCH-LD in Rockford, Illinois

The following low-power stations, which are no longer licensed, formerly broadcast on analog or digital channel 11:

- K11AG in Inkom, Idaho
- K11BC in Grace, etc., Idaho
- K11BI-D in Entiat, Washington
- K11BJ in White Bird, Idaho
- K11BV in Helper, Utah
- K11CB in Forsyth, Montana
- K11CC in Checkerboard, Montana
- K11CR in Ferdinand, Idaho
- K11CX in Beaver, etc., Utah
- K11DD in Green River, Utah
- K11DF in Vernal, etc., Utah
- K11FP in Manti, etc., Utah
- K11GO in Happy Camp, etc., California
- K11HS in Bridgeport, etc., California
- K11JO in Bloomfield, etc., New Mexico
- K11KR in Naknek, Alaska
- K11KU in Salida, etc., Colorado
- K11KW in Ainsworth, Nebraska
- K11LD in Likely, California
- K11LZ in Caineville, Utah
- K11MB in Lavina, Montana
- K11MF in Quartz Creek, etc., Montana
- K11MK in Vale, Oregon
- K11ML in Ridgecrest, etc., California
- K11MU-D in Paradise Valley, Nevada
- K11NA in Hatch, Utah
- K11ND in Hanna, etc., Utah
- K11NE in Hoopa, California
- K11NN in Barrow, Alaska
- K11NP in Garrison, etc., Utah
- K11NV in Guadalupita, New Mexico
- K11OJ in Sedalia, etc., Missouri
- K11OP in Virgin, Utah
- K11QN-D in Aniak, Alaska
- K11QV in Paxson, Alaska
- K11QW in Ekwok, Alaska
- K11QZ in Metlakatla, Alaska
- K11RA in Klawock, Alaska
- K11RC in Thorne Bay, Alaska
- K11RG in Gakona, Alaska
- K11RJ in Lake Louise, etc., Alaska
- K11RM in Silver Lake, etc., Oregon
- K11RQ-D in Chignik Lake, Alaska
- K11RV in Telida, Alaska
- K11SB in Russian Mission, Alaska
- K11SD in Eek, Alaska
- K11SX in Samak, Utah
- K11TD in Hopland, California
- K11TG in Fish Lake Resort, Utah
- K11TH in Nome, Alaska
- K11TL in Utahn, Utah
- K11UJ in Bozeman, Montana
- K11VB in Orovada, Nevada
- K11VP-D in Homer-Seldovia, Alaska
- K11VR in Montezuma Creek & Aneth, Utah
- K11VU in Bluff & area, Utah
- K11WD in Mexican Hat, Utah
- K11WE in Tonopah, Nevada
- K11XT-D in Mariposa, California
- KMHZ-LP in San Antonio, Texas
- KPBN-LP in Baton Rouge, Louisiana
- KQUX-LP in Austin, Texas
- KSPG-LP in Carrizo Springs, Texas
- KTEQ-LP in Fulton, Arkansas
- KUBD-LP in Kodiak, Alaska
- KUOK-CA in Norman, Oklahoma
- KXMN-LP in Spokane, etc., Washington
- W11AQ in Robbinsville, etc., North Carolina
- W11AX in Bat Cave, etc., North Carolina
- W11AY-D in St John Plantation, Maine
- W11CZ in Escanaba, Michigan
- WAKN-LP in Akron, Ohio
- WETV-CD in Murfreesboro, Tennessee
- WJFB-LP in Lebanon, Tennessee
- WMTO-LD in Manteo, North Carolina
- WMYG-LP in Lake City, Florida
