= KXLJ-LD =

Television station in Juneau, Alaska (2001–2020)

- Juneau, Alaska; United States
- Channels: Digital: 24 (UHF); Virtual: 24
- Branding: CBS Southeast

Programming
- Affiliations: Pax TV (March–August 2002); CBS (August 2002–2020)

Ownership
- Owner: Denali Media Holdings; (Denali Media Juneau, Corp.)
- Sister stations: KATH-LD, KUBD, KTNL-TV

History
- Founded: 2001
- First air date: October 12, 2005 (first incarnation); July 19, 2011 (second incarnation)
- Last air date: March 15, 2010 (first incarnation); September 18, 2020 (second incarnation)
- Former call signs: K24HB (2005–2007); KXLJ-LP (2007–2008); KXLJ-LD (2008); DKXLJ-LD (2008-2011); K24KH-D (2010–2011)
- Former channel numbers: Analog: 24 (UHF, 2002–2008)

Technical information
- Licensing authority: FCC
- Facility ID: 184508
- Class: LD
- ERP: 0.25 kW
- HAAT: −377.9 m (−1,240 ft)
- Transmitter coordinates: 58°17′58.8″N 134°25′26″W

Links
- Public license information: LMS

KXLJ-LD (channel 24) was a low-power television station in Juneau, Alaska, United States. It was a full-time satellite of Sitka-licensed CBS affiliate KTNL-TV (channel 13) which was owned by Denali Media Holdings (a subsidiary of local cable provider GCI). KXLJ-LD was a sister station to low-power NBC affiliate KATH-LD (channel 5), licensed to both Juneau and Douglas. KXLJ-LD shared transmitter facilities with KATH-LD in downtown Juneau.

== History ==
The station was not granted its original construction permit until October 4, 2005; however, it originally launched under a series of special temporary authority (STA) grants starting in 2001, the most recent one granted on April 4, 2008. These special temporary authority grants were for analog operation; however, in 2008, the station filed for a flash-cut to digital television, even though channel 24, as a low-power station, was exempt from the 2009 digital transition for full-service stations.

Channel 24 went on the air in March 2002 as an affiliate of Pax (now Ion Television); that August, it joined CBS, though some Pax programming remained on the schedule for some time thereafter. Before then, KUBD in Ketchikan and KTNL in Sitka served as the default over-the-air CBS affiliates for Southeast Alaska, while cable systems in Juneau imported KIRO-TV from Seattle for CBS programming instead. In early 2003, the station added simulcasts of the newscasts from fellow CBS affiliate KTVA in Anchorage. Though channel 24 referred to itself as "KTNL-LP" (matching the Sitka station), it was originally issued the temporary call sign K24FM; following the grant of the construction permit, the call sign K24HB was issued on October 12, 2005. The call letters were changed to KXLJ-LP on July 5, 2007, and were modified to KXLJ-LD (reflecting its conversion to digital) on October 6, 2008.

KXLJ-LD's construction permit was canceled on March 15, 2010, after the Federal Communications Commission (FCC) determined, while processing the station's application for a digital license, that the permit had expired on October 12, 2008. As a result, the station's owner, Ketchikan TV LLC, had to reapply for the channel 24 position in Juneau. On February 24, 2010, KXLJ-LD received special temporary authority from the FCC to return to the air, which was extended on August 18, 2010. The station was given the temporary call sign K24JH-D upon receiving the special temporary authority grant; after the new construction permit was granted on June 15, 2011, channel 24 was assigned the K24KH-D call sign, before regaining the KXLJ-LD call sign on July 6. The low-power station was again licensed on July 19, 2011. Since returning to the air, KXLJ-LD has transmitted a digital signal.

On December 9, 2013, Ketchikan TV filed to sell KXLJ-LD, along with KTNL and KUBD, to Denali Media Holdings, a subsidiary of local cable provider GCI. The deal made them sister stations to NBC affiliate KATH-LD in Juneau and its satellite KSCT-LP in Sitka, as well as KTVA. The sale was completed on July 28, 2014.

On September 18, 2020, KXLJ-LD signed off for the last time. On September 28, 2021, Denali Media surrendered the license of KXLJ-LD back to the FCC. Juneau-based repeater station, KYEX-LD (relaying Gray-owned Anchorage-based KAUU) now serves the former viewing area of KXLJ-LD as a dual affiliate of CBS and MyNetworkTV.

== Subchannel ==
Subchannel of KXLJ-LD
Channel	Res.	Short name	Programming
24.1	1080i	KXLJ-LD	CBS
