= KUBD =

KUBD may refer to:

- KUBD (TV), a television station (channel 4) licensed to Ketchikan, Alaska, United States
- KUBD-LP, a defunct low-power television station (channel 11) formerly licensed to Kodiak, Alaska, United States
