= KDMD =

KDMD may refer to:

- KDMD (TV), a television station (channel 33) licensed to serve Anchorage, Alaska, United States
- KYMU-LD, a low-power television station (channel 6) licensed to serve Seattle, Washington, United States, which held the call sign KDMD-LD from 2016 to 2019
- KDMD-LP, a defunct low-power television station (channel 32) formerly licensed to serve Fairbanks, Alaska
