= NBC 5 =

NBC 5 may refer to one of the following television stations in the United States:

== Current ==
=== Owned-and-operated stations ===
- KXAS-TV in Dallas/Fort Worth, Texas
- WMAQ-TV in Chicago, Illinois

=== Affiliated stations ===
- KALB-TV in Alexandria, Louisiana
- KATH-LD in Juneau, Alaska
- KDLV-TV in Mitchell, South Dakota
  - Simulcast of KDLT-TV in Sioux Falls, South Dakota
- KFYR-TV in Bismarck, North Dakota
- KGWN-DT2 in Cheyenne, Wyoming
  - Simulcast of KNEP in Sidney, Nebraska
- KING-TV in Seattle/Tacoma, Washington
- KOAA-TV in Pueblo/Colorado Springs, Colorado
- KOBI in Medford, Oregon
- KSCT-LP in Sitka, Alaska
- KSDK in Saint Louis, Missouri
- KSL-TV in Salt Lake City, Utah
- KVZK-5 in Pago Pago, American Samoa
- WBGH-CD in Binghamton, New York
  - Broadcasts on channel 20; branded as NBC 5
- WCYB-TV in Bristol, Virginia
- WLWT in Cincinnati, Ohio
- WMC-TV in Memphis, Tennessee
- WPTV in West Palm Beach, Florida
- WPTZ in Plattsburgh, New York / Burlington, Vermont
- WRAL-TV in Raleigh/Durham/Fayetteville, North Carolina

== Former ==
- KDLT-TV in Sioux Falls, South Dakota (1983 to 1998)
- KHAS-TV in Hastings/Lincoln/Kearney, Nebraska (1956 to 2014)
- KNHL in Hastings/Lincoln/Kearney, Nebraska (Analog/DT1 from 1956 to 2014 and DT2 from 2018 to 2022)
  - Was a simulcast of KSNB-TV in Superior, Nebraska on DT2
- KXGN-DT2 in Glendive, Montana (2010 to 2024)
- KRGV-TV in Weslaco/McAllen/Harlingen/Brownsville, Texas (1954 to 1976)
- KSTP-TV in Saint Paul/Minneapolis, Minnesota (1948 to 1979)
- WABI-TV in Bangor, Maine (1953 to 1959)
- WAVE-TV in Louisville, Kentucky (1948 to 1953; now on channel 3)
- WFRV-TV in Green Bay, Wisconsin (1959 to 1983)
- WHAM-TV/WROC-TV in Rochester, New York (1954 to 1962)
- WNEM-TV in Bay City/Flint/Saginaw, Michigan (1954 to 1995)
