= NBC 4 =

NBC 4 may refer to the following U.S. television stations affiliated with the National Broadcasting Company:

== Current ==
=== Owned-and-operated stations ===
- KNBC in Los Angeles, California
- WNBC in New York City, New York
- WRC-TV in Washington, D.C.

=== Affiliate stations ===
- KAMR-TV in Amarillo, Texas
- KARK-TV in Little Rock, Arkansas
- KFOR-TV in Oklahoma City, Oklahoma
- KNEP in Sidney/Scottsbluff, Nebraska
- KOB in Albuquerque/Santa Fe, New Mexico
- KRXI-DT2, a digital channel of KRXI-TV in Reno, Nevada (branded as News 4)
- KSNB-TV in Superior/Lincoln/ Kearney, Nebraska
- KTIV in Sioux City, Iowa
- KVOA in Tucson, Arizona
- WCMH-TV in Columbus, Ohio
- WDIV-TV in Detroit, Michigan
- WGCI-LD in Skowhegan, Maine, a repeater of WLBZ in Augusta, Maine
- WOAI-TV in San Antonio, Texas
- WSMV-TV in Nashville, Tennessee
- WTMJ-TV in Milwaukee, Wisconsin
- WTOM-TV in Cheboygan/Sault Ste. Marie, Michigan
- WTVY-DT4, a digital channel of WTVY in Dothan, Alabama
  - Simulcast of WRGX-LD
- WYFF in Greenville/Spartanburg, South Carolina (Asheville, North Carolina)

== Former ==
- KDYL-TV/KTVT/KCPX-TV (now KTVX) in Salt Lake City, Utah (1948–1960)
- KCNC-TV, along with previous call sign KOA-TV, in Denver, Colorado (1952–1995)
- KOMO-TV in Seattle, Washington (1953–1959)
- KOUS-TV (now KHMT) in Billings, Montana (1980–1987)
- KBTV-TV, along with previous call signs KPAC-TV and KJAC-TV, in Beaumont/Port Arthur, Texas (1957–2009)
- KRON-TV in San Francisco, California (1949–2001)
- KRNV-DT in Reno, Nevada (1962–2025)
- KSA-TV (via cable) in Sitka, Alaska (1959–1983)
- KWAB-TV (now KCWO-TV) in Big Spring, Texas (1982–2019)
  - Was a satellite of KWES-TV in Midland/Odessa
- WBEN-TV (now WIVB-TV) in Buffalo, New York (1948–1954)
- WBRC in Birmingham, Alabama (1949–1953; now on channel 6)
- WBZ-TV in Boston, Massachusetts (1948–1995)
- WCIV-TV (now WGWG) in Charleston, South Carolina (1962–1996)
- WDAF-TV in Kansas City, Missouri (1949–1994)
- WMCT (now WMC-TV) in Memphis, Tennessee (1948–1952; now on channel 5)
- WNBK (now WKYC) in Cleveland, Ohio (1948–1954; now on channel 3)
- WRGB in Albany, New York (1946–1954; now on channel 6)
- WTAR-TV (now WTKR), Norfolk, Virginia (1950–1952; now on channel 3)
- WTTV in Indianapolis, Indiana (1954–1956)
- WTVJ in Miami, Florida (1989–1995; now on channel 6)
