= KTNL-TV =

Television station in Sitka, Alaska

Currently silent
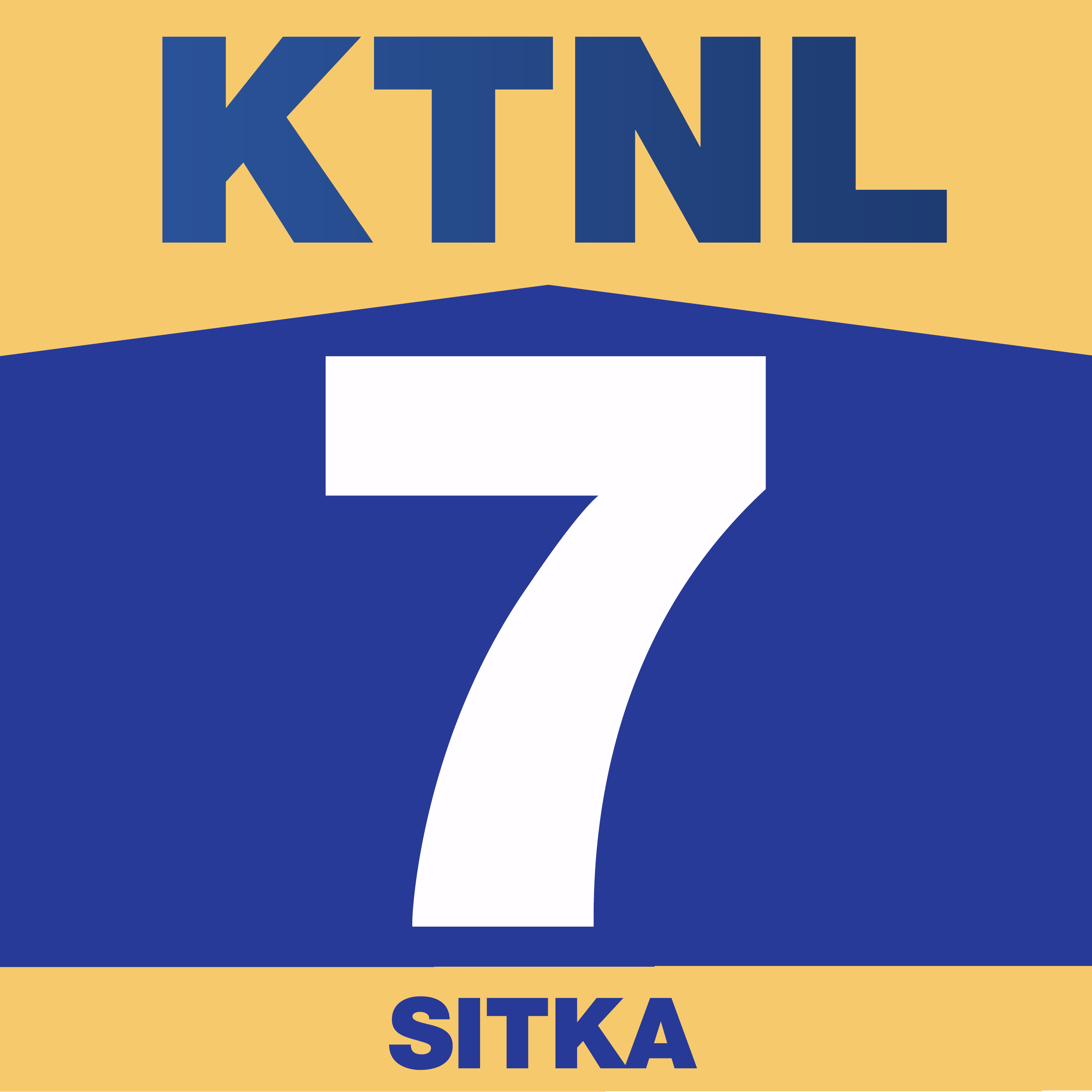
- Sitka, Alaska; United States
- Channels: Digital: 7 (VHF); Virtual: 7
- Branding: KTNL 7 Sitka

Ownership
- Owner: Bridge Media Networks; (Bridge News LLC)
- Sister stations: KDMD, KLDY-LD

History
- First air date: July 28, 1966
- Former call signs: KIFW-TV (1966–1983); KTNL (1983–2006)
- Former channel numbers: Analog: 13 (VHF, 1966–2009)
- Former affiliations: CBS (1966–2020); Dark (2020–2021); MeTV (2021–?)

Technical information
- Licensing authority: FCC
- Facility ID: 60519
- ERP: 0.35 kW
- HAAT: −216 m (−709 ft)
- Transmitter coordinates: 57°2′59.6″N 135°20′10.3″W

Links
- Public license information: Public file; LMS
- Website: ktnl.tv

KTNL-TV (channel 7) is a television station in Sitka, Alaska, United States, which is currently silent. The station is owned by Bridge Media Networks. KTNL-TV's transmitter is located in downtown Sitka; the station is programmed from studios in Anchorage.

The station was established as Sitka's only broadcast TV station in 1966 and primarily broadcast programs from CBS for the first 55 years of its history. It also offered limited local programming in various forms.

== History ==
=== As a CBS affiliate ===
Sitka Broadcasting Company, owner of Sitka radio station KIFW, received a construction permit from the Federal Communications Commission on June 7, 1966, allowing it to build a television station on channel 13. The station began broadcasting as KIFW-TV on July 28, 1966. It joined CBS that October, though it was a non-interconnected affiliate—one not connected by long lines to receive live network programming. Though it was the first broadcast station in Sitka, local programming was also available on the local cable system from KSA-TV, a local channel that had started in 1959.

In 1983, KIFW-TV was sold to Kathie and Dan Etulain. The call letters were changed to KTNL; though it was separated in ownership from KIFW, it continued to share the same building. The station remained primarily a CBS affiliate, though it also aired Christian programming, owing to a new relationship with Alaska Christian Television Services. KTNL installed a satellite dish in 1985. This allowed it to receive live CBS programming; previously, network programs were aired on a two-week delay via videotapes recorded off KIRO-TV in Seattle and mailed to Sitka, while the Rural Alaska Television Network provided live news and sports. In 1989, the station left the building shared with KIFW radio; the first attempt to relocate was denied by a zoning board in 1988, but the move took place the next year and gave the radio station more room.

A company known as Sitka News Bureau, owned by the Baggen family, acquired the station in 1992. Sitka News Bureau aired a newscast of the same name on the local public access cable channel. The station relocated to Sitka News Bureau's facilities on Harbor Drive, announced its plans to drop all non-CBS network programming, and added the newscasts to its lineup. Etulain retained the previous facilities for video production as North Star and returned to television broadcasting when KSCT-LP began broadcasting in 1995. In spite of announcing the station would be a sole CBS affiliate, KTNL-TV remained a secondary affiliate of ABC, mostly for key programs like Monday Night Football. The newscast was dropped in November 1993 so the station could redistribute its efforts toward producing local advertising instead of newsgathering. In 1996, Wright Home, Inc., acquired KTNL-TV. It sold the station to GreenTV of Evergreen, Colorado, owned by Penny and David Drucker, in 2000; the Druckers owned KDMD in Anchorage and KUBD in Ketchikan.

In 2014, Ketchikan TV—the renamed GreenTV—sold KTNL-TV, KUBD and KXLJ-LD to Denali Media Holdings, a subsidiary of Alaskan telecommunications firm GCI. GCI had earlier bought KTVA, the CBS affiliate in Anchorage, and North Star, owner of KSCT-LP and KATH-LP in Juneau.

=== Post-CBS affiliation ===
GCI exited broadcasting in 2020 by selling the rights to CBS in Anchorage and Southeast Alaska, as well as KSCT-LP, KATH-LP, and KUBD, to Gray Television. With the station's programming, assets, and network affiliation having been sold, Denali Media took KTNL-TV off the air on October 31, 2020. In 2021, Denali Media sold KTNL-TV back to Ketchikan TV.

On December 11, 2023, it was announced that Ketchikan TV would sell KTNL, KDMD and three low-power stations to Bridge News LLC, backed by entrepreneur Manoj Bhargava, for $2.4 million. The sale was completed on March 12, 2024. As of December 2024, KTNL-TV is silent due to equipment failure.
