= KBLT =

KBLT may refer to:

- KBLT-LD, a low-power television station (channel 32, virtual 31) licensed to serve Anchorage, Alaska, United States
- KTRU-LP, a low-power radio station (96.1 FM) licensed to serve Houston, Texas, United States, which held the call sign KBLT-LP from 2015 to 2019
- KHCU (FM), a radio station (93.1 FM) licensed to serve Concan, Texas, which held the call sign KBLT from 1997 to 2013
- KMRX, a radio station (96.1 FM) licensed to serve El Dorado, Arkansas, United States, which held the call sign KBLT from 1991 to 1993
- KJML, a radio station (107.1 FM) licensed to serve Columbus, Kansas, United States, which held the call sign KBLT from 1979 to 1988
