= KXLJ =

KXLJ may refer to:

- KXLJ-LD, a defunct television station (channel 24) formerly licensed to serve Juneau, Alaska
- KXXJ, a radio station (1330 AM) licensed to Juneau, Alaska, United States, used the KXLJ calls from 2007 to 2011.
