= Knik TV Mast =

Television transmitter in Alaska

Coordinates: 61°25′19.75″N 149°52′27.6″W

Knik TV Mast, located near Knik, Alaska, is a 246 metres (807 ft) tall guyed mast used for FM radio and television broadcasting. The mast is operated by Alaska Public Telecommunications, Inc. The mast gained the distinction as the tallest structure in Alaska, following the April 28, 2010 demolition of the 411 metres (1,348 ft) guyed mast at LORAN-C transmitter Port Clarence.

The following transmitters are radiated:

== Television ==
Program	Channel Number	Transmission Power
KAUU	7	50 kW
KAKM	8	50 kW
KTUU-TV	10	50 kW
KYUR	12	41 kW

== FM radio ==
Program	Channel Number	Transmission Power
KNBA	90.3 MHz	100 kW
KSKA	91.1 MHz	100 kW
