= John Seibel =

American broadcaster (born 1970)

John Seibel (born 1970) is a former American television news anchor and radio personality.

== Armed services and education ==
Seibel served in the U.S. Air Force from January 1989-September 1991 as part of the Early Warning Missile Defense systems for NORAD at Falcon Air Force Station. He then served in the Hawaii Air National Guard from September 1991-May 1994 in a communications mobility unit. While in Hawaii, Seibel was also a television uplinker for Vision Accomplished. Seibel is a 1997 Graduate of the Walter Cronkite School of Journalism and Telecommunication at Arizona State University, walking with honors as the school's Outstanding Graduate.

== Alaska ==
From 1997 to 2000, Seibel worked at KIMO-TV in Anchorage, Alaska. He was the sports director of the ABC affiliate for three years winning numerous awards during his short tenure. Seibel won Alaska Broadcasters Association Goldie awards for Best Play-by-Play and Best Live Event all three years and Best Entertainment Program in 2000. Seibel was also named the NSSA's Sportscaster of the Year in 1997.

== ESPN ==
Seibel was at ESPN for nine years. One of the more versatile commentators at the Worldwide Leader, Seibel anchored ESPNews from October 2000 until his departure in November 2009 while assuming many roles on ESPN Radio.

Seibel served as ESPN Radio's weekend host of GameNight in the summer of 2002 before joining ESPN Radio full-time. During his seven years of radio, Seibel hosted NFL on ESPN Radio, The Baseball Show, GameNight, The SportsBash, The Huddle with Mike Ditka, SportsNation, Football Tonight and Baseball Tonight. In 2007 and 2008, Seibel was the emcee for an ESPN/NFL joint effort Monday Night Football Chalk Talk Luncheon Series, anchoring a panel of former football greats.

== Seibel, Starkey and Miller ==
Moving to Pittsburgh, Pennsylvania in January 2010, Seibel hosted KDKA-FM's afternoon drive show Seibel, Starkey and Miller on 93.7 The Fan, from 2-6 PM. He left KDKA-FM in December 2012.

== WDTN ==
In January 2014, Seibel became the morning co-anchor on WDTN, the NBC affiliate in Dayton, Ohio. He became the evening co-anchor in September 2021 upon the retirement of Mark Allan. On September 13, 2024, Seibel left broadcasting to become the executive director of a nonprofit organization.

== Personal ==
Seibel is from Englewood, Ohio. He and his wife, Heather, have three children born in 2007, 2009 and 2011. The Seibels met at ESPN. Their story and wedding was chronicled on TLC's A Wedding Story.
