= KUBD-LP =

Kodiak, Alaska; United States
- Channels: Analog: 11 (VHF)
- Branding: KUBD-LP Channel 11

Ownership
- Owner: Ketchikan TV, LLC

History
- Former call signs: K11UQ (2001–2002)
- Former affiliations: CBS; Ion Television

Technical information
- Licensing authority: FCC
- Facility ID: 130177
- ERP: 0.18 kW
- Transmitter coordinates: 57°48′1.3″N 152°23′2.8″W

Links
- Public license information: LMS

KUBD-LP (channel 11) was a low-power television station in Kodiak, Alaska, United States, affiliated with CBS and Ion Television. The station was owned by Ketchikan TV, LLC.

KUBD-LP was available only over-the-air; GCI, the cable system on Kodiak Island, opted for Anchorage CBS affiliate KAUU instead.

KUBD-LP's license was canceled by the Federal Communications Commission on July 20, 2021, as the station did not obtain a license for digital operation prior to the July 13 deadline.

== See also ==
- KUBD (TV)
