= KATV (Alaska) =

Cable television service and station in Ketchikan, Alaska

KATV ("Ketchikan Alaska Television") was a cable television service in Ketchikan, Alaska Territory, United States. It was established in November 1953 (six years before statehood) and was the first television service of any kind in Alaska.

== History ==
R. D. "Chuck" Jensen and Wally Christiansen started KATV in 1953 with the goal of bringing television to Ketchikan, then a town of about 5,000 people. At the time the system was announced in July, the then-Alaska Territory (which became a state in 1959) had no broadcast television stations, and it was not expected that there would be one before the end of the year; consequently, KATV announced its programming would consist of films and kinescopes supplied from the mainland. Leasing space on power poles from the local public utilities board, the first pictures from the system went out on November 17, 1953. In large part thanks to a slew of technical difficulties at KFIA (channel 2), one of two television stations under construction at Anchorage, KATV became Alaska's first television station; Anchorage's first two stations, KFIA and KTVA (channel 11), started days apart in December. All of the equipment used at KATV was handmade by Jensen and Christiansen in Ketchikan, except for a camera used for locally produced programs.

Business was slow in the early years due to the novelty of the venture to viewers and owners alike. For much of the first decade, KATV continued to provide mostly filmed programs shipped from Seattle—entertainment shows on a two-week delay, national news programs on a one-week delay—as well as local shows, including news, a local talent show, and televised bingo. Live programs from outside came to Ketchikan in 1967 after a translator association was created to receive and rebroadcast programming from television transmitters in Prince Rupert, British Columbia, and by 1978, the cable service offered 10 channels with a large portion of live programming.

In 1980, Jensen and Christiansen sold KATV and KSA-TV, a smaller service set up along the same lines at Sitka in 1959, to McCaw Cable.
