= KUBD (TV) =

Television station in Ketchikan, Alaska

Satellite of KYEX-LD, Juneau, Alaska
- Ketchikan, Alaska; United States
- Channels: Digital: 13 (VHF); Virtual: 2, 5
- Branding: CBS Southeast

Programming
- Affiliations: CBS

Ownership
- Owner: Gray Media; (Gray Television Licensee, LLC)
- Sister stations: KATH-LD, KSCT-LP

History
- First air date: April 1, 1995
- Former call signs: KNEB-TV (1995–1998)
- Former channel numbers: Analog: 4 (VHF, 1995–2009); Virtual: 4 (2009–2020)
- Former affiliations: TBN (1995–1998); Pax/Ion (1998–2000s, secondary from 2000)

Technical information
- Licensing authority: FCC
- Facility ID: 60520
- ERP: 0.18 kW
- HAAT: −71 m (−233 ft)
- Transmitter coordinates: 55°20′59.1″N 131°40′28.1″W

Links
- Public license information: Public file; LMS
- Website: www.alaskasnewssource.com

KUBD (channels 2 and 5) is a television station in Ketchikan, Alaska, United States, affiliated with CBS. Owned by Gray Media, it is operated as a full-time satellite of Juneau-licensed KYEX-LD (channel 5). KUBD's transmitter is located in downtown Ketchikan.

On cable, KUBD is available on channel 4 on GCI and KPU CommVision, the latter of which is owned by the City of Ketchikan.

== History ==
The station went on the air April 1, 1995 as KNEB-TV, operating on analog channel 4. It became KUBD in 1998. Originally a TBN affiliate, the station switched to Pax (now Ion Television) when it launched in 1998 and joined CBS in 2000. It continued a secondary affiliation with Pax for some time after joining CBS.

KUBD launched its digital signal in early 2006 on channel 13. KUBD stayed on channel 13 when the digital switchover took place in 2009.

On December 9, 2013, Ketchikan TV filed to sell KUBD, along with KTNL-TV in Sitka and KXLJ-LD in Juneau, to Denali Media Holdings, a subsidiary of local cable provider GCI. The deal made them sister stations to NBC affiliate KATH-LD in Juneau and its satellite KSCT-LP in Sitka, as well as fellow CBS affiliate KTVA in Anchorage. The sale was completed on July 28, 2014.

In 2020, it was announced that Gray Television would purchase KUBD along with four other stations from Denali Media Holdings.

== Subchannels ==
The station's digital signal is multiplexed:

Subchannels of KUBD
Channel	Res.	Short name	Programming
2.1	1080i	KUBD	NBC
5.1	1080i	KYES-HD	CBS (KAUU)
5.4	480i	MyNet	MyNetworkTV (KAUU)

Simulcast of subchannels of another station

== See also ==
- KTUU-TV
- KAUU
