= KSA-TV =

Cable TV station in Sitka, Alaska, United States

KSA-TV, broadcasting on cable systems on channel 4, was a television station in Sitka, Alaska, United States, affiliated with NBC. It was the first local television station in Sitka, operating between 1959 and 1983. It was also an affiliate of the NTA Film Network.

== History ==
KSA-TV launched on November 15, 1959, at 6 p.m., as the first television station of any kind in Sitka. It was owned by a company known as Sitka Alaska TeleVision; the majority shareholder, Ketchikan Alaska TeleVision, operated a similar "KATV" in Ketchikan, which had gone on the air before any broadcast stations in Anchorage, Fairbanks, or Juneau.

KSA-TV continued to broadcast into the early 1980s. In 1980, McCaw Cable acquired the Sitka cable system and KSA-TV. NBC programs remained on channel 4, though the KSA-TV moniker was abandoned. The station carried radically different programming in daytime hours due to duplication between CBS affiliate KIFW-TV (channel 13), KSA-TV and the Alaska Satellite Television Project.

In 1983, McCaw consolidated its channels of delayed NBC and ABC programming into one service, dubbed "Northstar". In 1986, McCaw began live delivery of WDIV-TV (NBC) and WXYZ-TV (ABC) programming utilizing the CANCOM feeds of Detroit stations, replacing the taped Northstar service.
