= KDMD (TV) =

Television station in Anchorage, Alaska

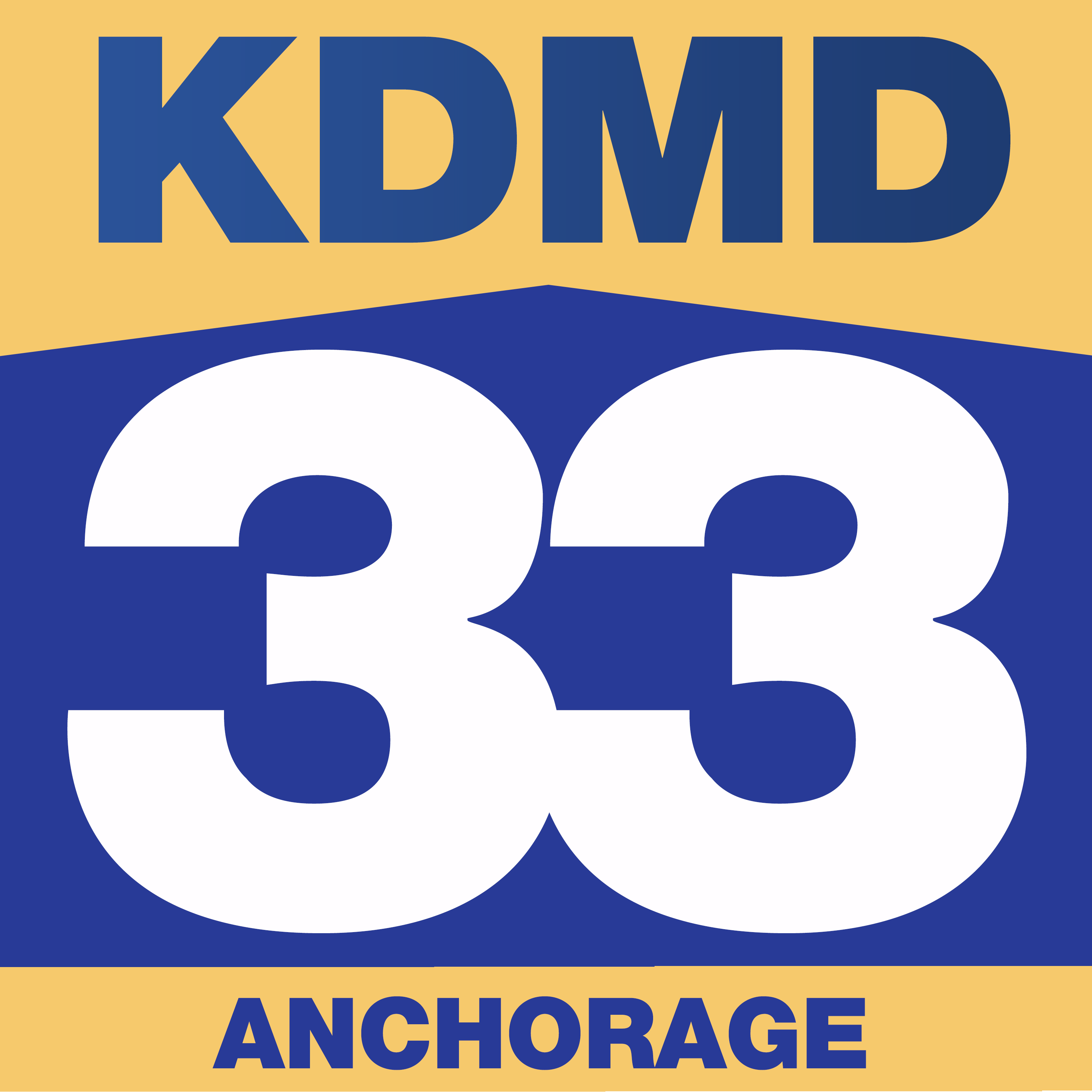

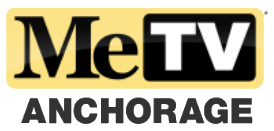
- Anchorage, Alaska; United States
- Channels: Digital: 33 (UHF); Virtual: 33
- Branding: KDMD 33 Anchorage; MeTV Anchorage (33.3)

Programming
- Affiliations: 33.1: Ion Television; 33.3: MeTV; for others, see § Subchannels

Ownership
- Owner: Bridge Media Networks; (Bridge News LLC)
- Sister stations: KLDY-LD, KTNL-TV

History
- First air date: October 1, 1989
- Former channel numbers: Analog: 33 (UHF, 1989–2009)
- Former affiliations: Independent (1989–1998); HSN (secondary, 2000s); Telemundo (33.2, 2007–2025)

Technical information
- Licensing authority: FCC
- Facility ID: 25221
- ERP: 34.28 kW
- HAAT: 300.2 m (985 ft)
- Transmitter coordinates: 61°20′8.8″N 149°30′56.2″W
- Translator(s): K25QK-D Anchorage

Links
- Public license information: Public file; LMS
- Website: www.kdmd.tv

KDMD (channel 33) is a television station in Anchorage, Alaska, United States, affiliated with Ion Television and MeTV. The station is owned by Bridge Media Networks alongside KLDY-LD (channel 31), and maintains studios on East 66th Avenue near the Seward Highway in Anchorage; its transmitter is located in Eagle River.

== History ==
The station debuted on the air on October 1, 1989, with a mix of religious, classic TV and paid programming before joining Pax TV (the original name for Ion) in 1998. Today, it airs Ion and a variety of local programming. From 2002 to 2006, KDMD carried Seattle Mariners baseball via the Mariners Television Network.

In June 2007, the station began broadcasting Telemundo on a digital subchannel, making it the first Spanish-language broadcast station in Alaska. This affiliation ended in 2025.

On December 11, 2023, it was announced that Ketchikan TV would sell KDMD, sister station KTNL-TV in Sitka, and three low-power stations to Bridge News LLC, backed by entrepreneur Manoj Bhargava, for $2.4 million. The sale was completed on March 12, 2024.

=== KDMD-DT3 ===
KDMD-DT3 (branded MeTV Alaska) is the MeTV-affiliated third digital subchannel of KDMD, broadcasting in standard definition on channel 33.3. In addition to MeTV programming, the subchannel broadcasts a mix of local Alaskan programming daily from both professional and amateur video producers. Until 2010, KDMD-DT3 operated as a separate station on analog UHF channel 38 under the calls KACN-LP. On April 24, 2014, KDMD-DT3 became a MeTV affiliate.

== Subchannels ==
The station's signal is multiplexed:

Subchannels of KDMD
Channel	Res.	Short name	Programming
33.1	480i	KDMD	Ion Television
33.2	480i	Bridge1	Infomercials
33.3	480i	MeTV	MeTV
33.4	480i	Grit	Grit
33.5	480i	Bridge2	Infomercials
33.6	480i	CourtTV	Court TV
33.7	480i	Laff	Laff
33.8	480i	Movies	Movies! (4:3)
33.9	480i	Catchy	Catchy Comedy (4:3)
33.10	480i	ZLiving	Z Living (4:3)
33.11	480i	Buzzr	Buzzr
33.12	480i	AWSN	All Women's Sports Network
33.13	480i	OAN	One America Plus
33.14	480i	DrOz	Oz TV

Subchannel broadcast with MPEG-4 video

== See also ==
- KUBD-LP
