= KTUU-TV =

Television station in Anchorage, Alaska

- Anchorage, Alaska; United States
- Channels: Digital: 10 (VHF); Virtual: 2, 5.11
- Branding: Channel 2; CBS 5 Anchorage (5.11); Alaska's News Source (newscasts)

Programming
- Affiliations: 2.1: NBC; 5.11: CBS; for others, see § Subchannels

Ownership
- Owner: Gray Media; (Gray Television Licensee, LLC)
- Sister stations: KAUU, KATH-LD

History
- Founded: December 14, 1953
- Former call signs: KFIA (1953–1955); KENI-TV (1955–1981)
- Former channel numbers: Analog: 2 (VHF, 1953–2009)
- Former affiliations: NBC/ABC (joint primary, 1953–1967); ABC (1967–1971); NBC (secondary, 1967–1970); PBS (The Electric Company, 1970–1975)
- Call sign meaning: "TUU" sounds like "two"

Technical information
- Licensing authority: FCC
- Facility ID: 10173
- ERP: 50 kW
- HAAT: 240 m (787 ft)
- Transmitter coordinates: 61°25′20″N 149°52′28″W

Links
- Public license information: Public file; LMS
- Website: www.alaskasnewssource.com

KTUU-TV (channel 2) is a television station in Anchorage, Alaska, United States, affiliated with NBC and CBS. It is owned by Gray Media alongside KAUU (channel 5), an independent station with MyNetworkTV. The two stations share studios on East 40th Avenue in midtown Anchorage; KTUU-TV's transmitter is located in Knik, Alaska.

Some of KTUU-TV's programming is broadcast to rural communities via low-power translators through the Alaska Rural Communications Service (ARCS).

== History ==
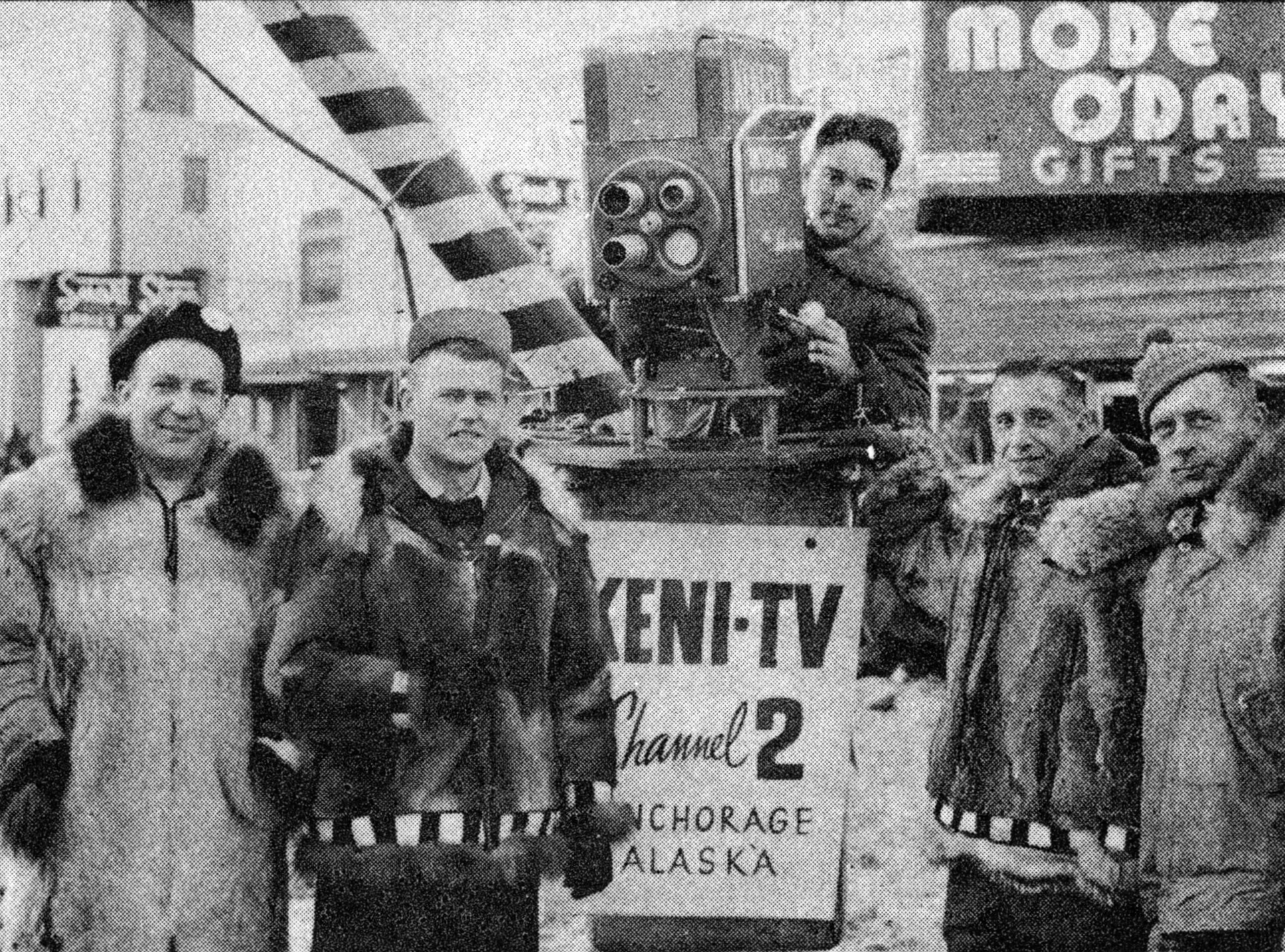
KENI-TV personnel and mushing officials pose for a photo while covering the World Championship Sled Dog Race during the 1958 Fur Rendezvous Festival in downtown Anchorage. From left, general manager Al Bramstedt, news anchor Ty Clark, cameraman Jim Balog, Bill Stewart and master of ceremonies Orville Lake.

The construction permit for channel 2 in Anchorage was issued on July 29, 1953, to Keith Kiggins and Richard R. Rollins. The permit took the call sign KFIA ("First in Anchorage") and then began construction, with an antenna being placed atop the Westward Hotel at Third Avenue and F Street. The same day the FCC granted a construction permit for channel 2, it also greenlit Anchorage's channel 11, KTVA, sparking a race to be the first broadcast television station in the territory (statehood for Alaska would come in 1959).

It appeared that KFIA was ahead when it announced it would broadcast its first test pattern on October 15, as KTVA was unpacking its equipment. However, it failed to put out a picture that night. Two days later, on the October 17, the first television test pattern in Alaska was broadcast, but the station missed its announced November 1 start date. Picture quality control equipment was late getting to Anchorage, pushing back the start date twice. It was only a month and a half later that KFIA made it on the air, on December 14, but in that time, it had lost its claim to be first in Anchorage with programming, as KTVA had signed on December 11. Both stations had also been beat by a cable system in Ketchikan to be the first source of television programming anywhere in the territory. When the station did get on the air, it did so "quietly and without fanfare", in the words of its general manager.

Midnight Sun Broadcasting (The Lathrop Company), owned by Alvin Oscar "Al" Bramstedt Sr. bought the station in 1954; the station's call letters were changed to KENI-TV in 1955; that year, it moved into the Fourth Avenue Theatre, also known as the Lathrop Building, downtown. Lathrop sold KENI-AM-TV plus its other radio and TV stations—KTKN in Ketchikan, KFAR-AM-TV in Fairbanks, and KINY-AM-TV in Juneau—to All-Alaska Broadcasting Company, which later became Midnight Sun Broadcasters in 1960.

On September 19, 1966, channel 2 became the first station in Alaska to transmit in color when it aired the premiere episode of the ABC sitcom That Girl (entitled "Don't Just Do Something, Stand There!"). The station had joint primary affiliation with NBC and ABC (with KTVA picking up some of the slack) until October 1, 1967, when it switched to ABC primary and NBC secondary, primarily because ABC had more programs on film. Channel 2 became a full-time ABC affiliate in 1970 when KHAR (channel 13, now KYUR) took the NBC affiliation. The two stations switched networks in October 1971, at which time KHAR became KIMO. Channel 2 also carried a few PBS programs (particularly The Electric Company) until KAKM signed on in 1975. Until KTVF in Fairbanks switched networks from CBS to NBC in April 1996, KTUU was the only full-time NBC affiliate in Alaska, clearing every network program. On June 3, 1981, Midnight Sun Broadcasters sold the station to Zaser and Longston of Bellevue, Washington, who changed the call letters to the current KTUU-TV the next week on June 10 in conjunction with the sale.

In August 2010, KTUU became the third Schurz-owned television station (after KWCH-DT and KSCW-DT in Wichita, Kansas, and WDBJ in Roanoke, Virginia) to relaunch its website through a new partnership with the Tribune Company's Tribune Interactive division. Previously, the Web address was operated by the local media division of World Now. The other Schurz television station websites, which were operated by Broadcast Interactive Media, also followed after their CMS contract with BIM ran out.

On November 9, 2013, KTUU-TV was dropped by GCI in 22 rural communities, after the two sides were unable to come to a new retransmission agreement, though GCI still carries some KTUU and NBC programming in some of these areas through the Alaska Rural Communications Service. The dispute did not involve areas (including Anchorage) where GCI carries KTUU through must-carry. The move followed the sale of rival KTVA to a subsidiary of GCI a week earlier, which KTUU had opposed over concerns that this move could be made. KTUU's channel slot on most of the affected systems was filled by Starz Kids & Family. Despite this dispute, KTUU extended its newscast carriage agreement with KATH-LD in Juneau and KSCT-LP in Sitka (which were also acquired by GCI at the same time it acquired KTVA) through November 22; that agreement was subsequently extended through December 6 as negotiations continued toward a long-term deal, but talks ultimately broke down, and by December 7 KATH/KSCT no longer aired KTUU programming. A deal between GCI and KTUU was finally reached on February 6, 2014; this allowed the station to return to GCI's rural systems (as well as separately-owned cable systems that receive KTUU through GCI) in time for NBC's broadcast of the 2014 Winter Olympics, as well as the eventual restoration of KTUU's newscasts to KATH/KSCT.

Schurz announced on September 14, 2015, that it would exit broadcasting and sell its television and radio stations, including KTUU-TV, to Gray Television for $442.5 million. Associated with the purchase, on October 1, 2015, it was announced that Gray would buy MyNetworkTV-affiliated KYES-TV for $500,000. The acquisition of KYES created the first legal duopoly in the market (KTBY and KYUR operate as a virtual duopoly). The FCC approved the Schurz sale on February 12, 2016; and the sale was completed on February 16. The KYES acquisition was completed on June 27, 2016; it had been approved on June 17 under the condition that KYES not affiliate with a network that would make that station one of the top-four stations in the Anchorage market.

== News operation ==
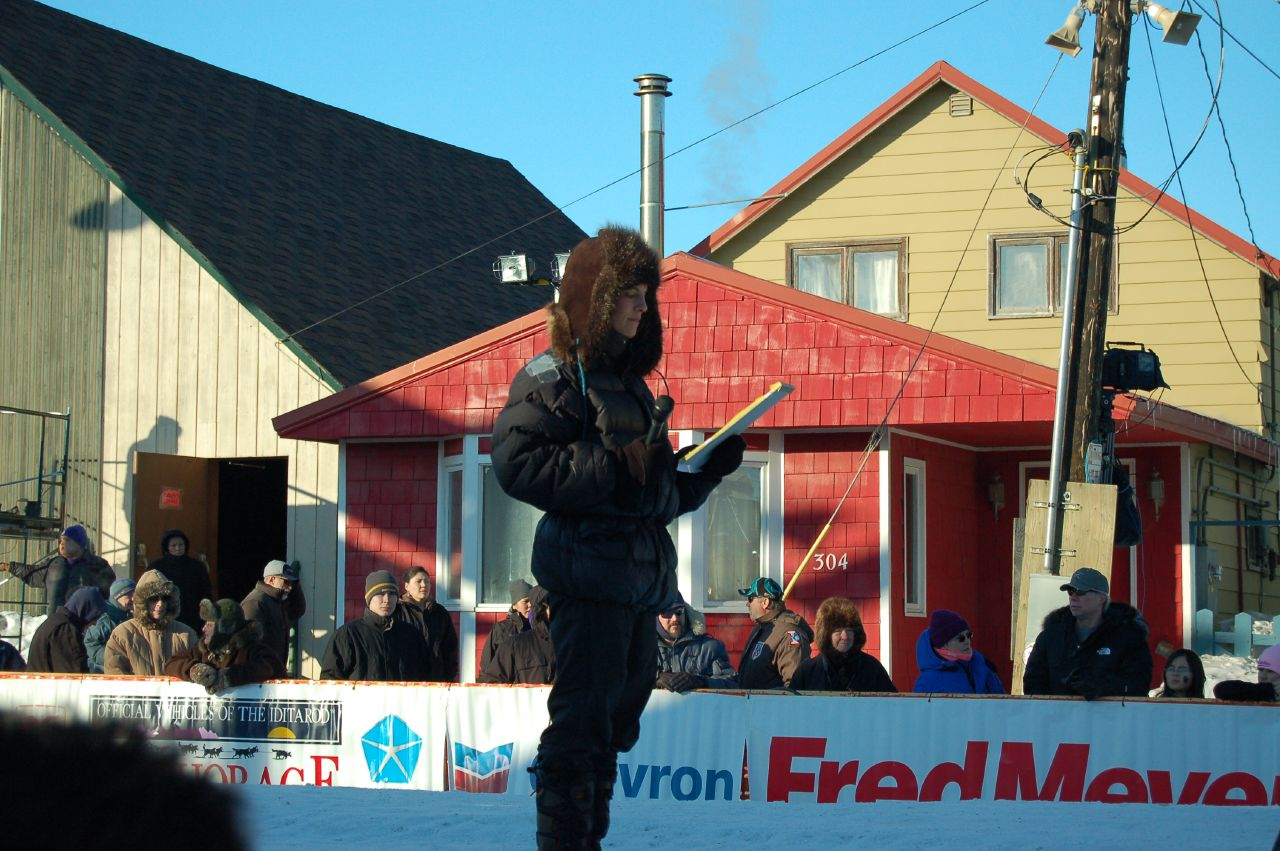
Megan Baldino, former reporter and anchor, waits to begin her report from Front Street in Nome during the 2007 Iditarod.

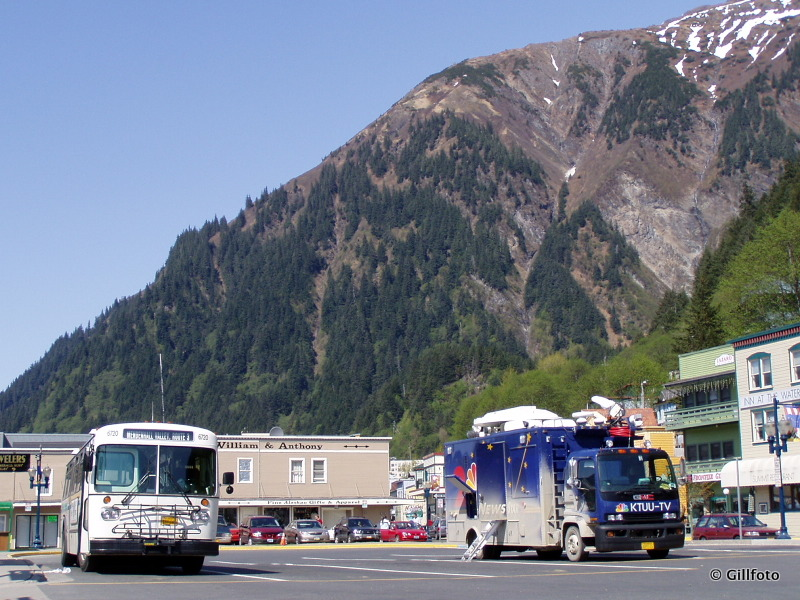
KTUU's News Star truck parked alongside South Franklin Street in downtown Juneau, circa 2002.

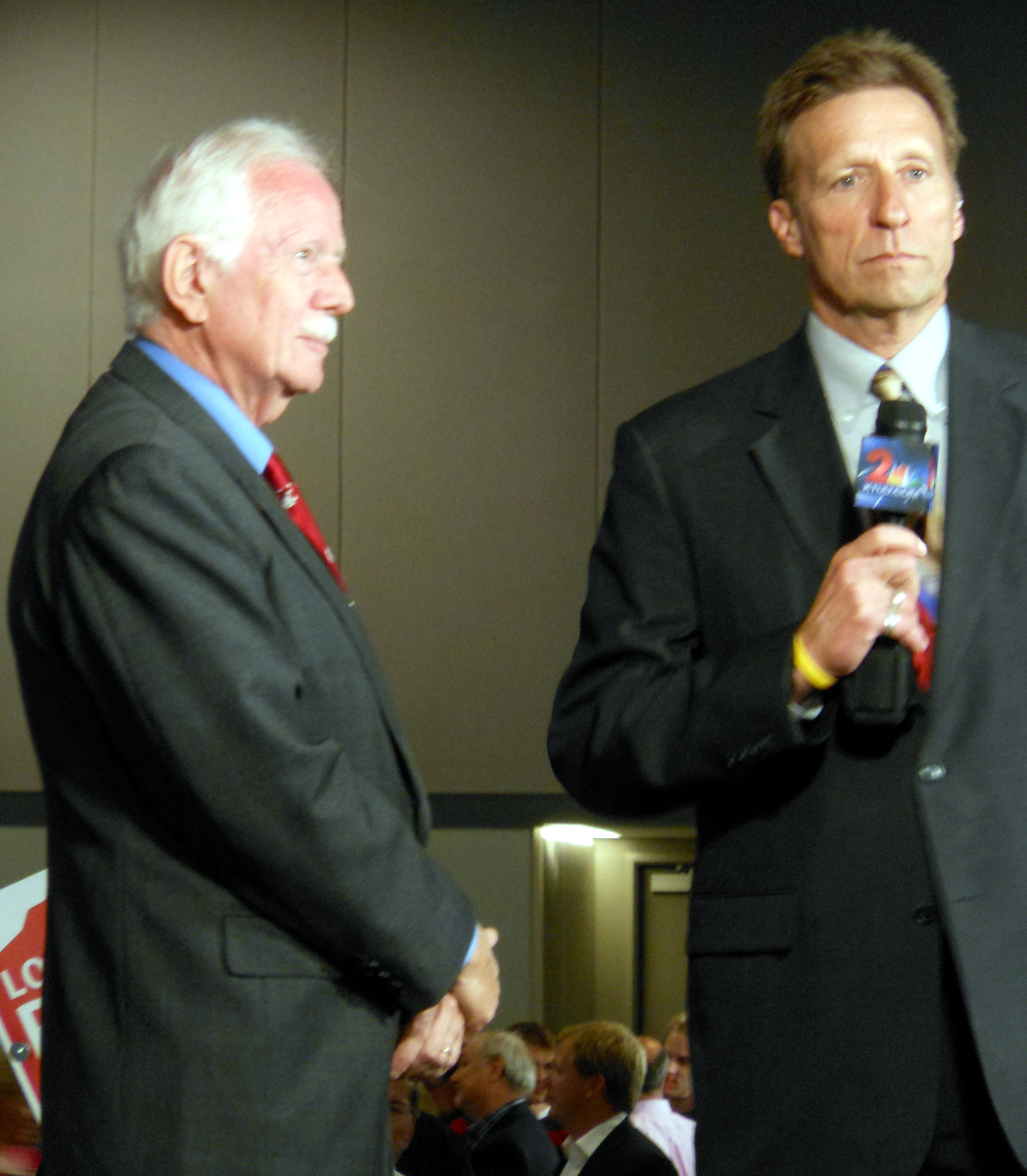
Steve MacDonald, anchor and reporter from 1996 to 2016, prior to a live interview with Alaska Senate candidate Bob Bell at the Dena'ina Center in August 2012.

KTUU presently broadcasts 22 hours, 25 minutes of locally produced newscasts each week (with 4 hours, 5 minutes each weekday and one hour each on Saturdays and Sundays). The two-hour weekday newscast Morning Edition, 6 p.m. hour, and 10 p.m. late newscast are simulcast with KAUU. A half-hour KTUU-exclusive newscast airs at 5 p.m., followed by the NBC Nightly News at 5:30 p.m. All newscasts are branded as Alaska's News Source, KTUU's longtime news slogan. KTUU does not carry a midday or weekend morning newscast.

Following Gray's purchase of the non-license assets of KTVA, that station's news operation was inherited by KYES-TV (now KAUU); with its existing ownership of KTUU-TV, this gave Gray control of two news operations in the Anchorage market. On August 30, 2020, KTVA's news operation aired its final newscast from its facility. The next day, Gray launched Alaska's News Source, which hired 11 staffers from KTVA, and acts as a combined news operation for both KTUU and KYES. The combined newscasts began to air August 31, 2020. In November 2024, sister station KTVF in Fairbanks closed its news department and began to simulcast KTUU's newscasts.

KTUU has been the top-rated station in the Anchorage market for decades; its ratings for their newscasts helped make them one of the strongest NBC affiliates in the country and its newscasts routinely receive several times more viewers than its competition. The KTUU news team routinely wins regional and national awards and in 1999, became the first television station in Alaska with their own satellite uplink truck (NewsStar 2). The National Press Photographers Association named KTUU the Small Market Television News Photography Station of the Year in 2006, 2008 and 2010. In 2013, KTUU was also the first in Alaska to broadcast their news in high definition.

== Notable former staff ==
- Chuck Henry – anchor (1967–1968, later at KNBC in Los Angeles; now retired)
- Sarah Palin – fill-in sports anchor; former Alaska governor and U.S. vice presidential candidate

== Technical information ==
=== Subchannels ===
The station's digital signal is multiplexed:

Subchannels of KTUU-TV
Channel	Res.	Short name	Programming
2.1	1080i	KTUU-HD	NBC
2.2	480i	H&I	Heroes & Icons
2.3	480i	StartTV	Start TV
2.4	480i	Crime	True Crime Network
5.11	1080i	CBS	CBS

=== Analog-to-digital conversion ===
KTUU-TV ended regular programming over its analog signal, over VHF channel 2, on June 12, 2009, the official date on which full-power television stations in the United States transitioned from analog to digital broadcasts under federal mandate. The station's digital signal remained on its pre-transition VHF channel 10, using virtual channel 2.

As part of the SAFER Act, KTUU-TV kept its analog signal on the air until July 12 to inform viewers of the digital television transition through a loop of public service announcements from the National Association of Broadcasters.

=== Translators ===
KTUU-TV extends its over-the-air coverage through a network of translator stations.

- Girdwood: K12MM-D
- Homer: K08PN-D
- Kasilof: K23OE-D
- Kenai: K10NC-D
- Ninilchik: K27AI-D

== See also ==
- Hawaii News Now (a combined news operation for sister stations KGMB and KHNL in Honolulu, Hawaii)
