= KAUU =

Television station in Anchorage, Alaska

- Anchorage, Alaska; United States
- Channels: Digital: 7 (VHF); Virtual: 5
- Branding: Channel 5 Anchorage; My TV 5.4

Programming
- Affiliations: 5.4: Independent with MyNetworkTV; for others, see § Subchannels

Ownership
- Owner: Gray Media; (Gray Television Licensee, LLC)
- Sister stations: KTUU-TV

History
- First air date: January 21, 1990
- Former call signs: KYES (1990–2007); KYES-TV (2007–2021)
- Former channel numbers: Analog: 5 (VHF, 1990–2009); Digital: 6 (VHF, until 2009), 5 (VHF, 2009–2018)
- Former affiliations: Independent (1990–1995); UPN (1995–2006); The WB (secondary, 1995–1998); MyNetworkTV (2006–2020; now on 5.4); CBS (2020–2021)
- Call sign meaning: Variant of KTUU

Technical information
- Licensing authority: FCC
- Facility ID: 21488
- ERP: 50 kW
- HAAT: 240.1 m (788 ft)
- Transmitter coordinates: 61°25′20″N 149°52′28″W
- Translator(s): 14 (UHF) Anchorage (city); KYES-LD 22 Anchorage; KTUU-DT 5.11 (10.7 VHF) Anchorage; KYEX-LD 5 Juneau

Links
- Public license information: Public file; LMS
- Website: www.alaskasnewssource.com

KAUU (channel 5) is a television station in Anchorage, Alaska, United States. It is programmed primarily as an independent station, but maintains a secondary affiliation with MyNetworkTV. KAUU is owned by Gray Media alongside dual NBC/CBS affiliate KTUU-TV (channel 2) and the two stations share studios on East 40th Avenue in Anchorage; KAUU's transmitter is located in Knik, Alaska.

KAUU (as KYES-TV) acquired the CBS affiliation for Anchorage on July 31, 2020, when Gray Television purchased the non-license assets of KTVA (channel 11) from Denali Media Holdings, a subsidiary of local cable television operator GCI. KAUU continues to carry its former primary service and schedule on its fourth subchannel, and GCI channel 11. Programming from KAUU's fourth subchannel is available statewide through the Alaska Rural Communications Service (ARCS) translator network.

As of September 2020, KAUU shares its website and news operation with KTUU, which are both branded under the "Alaska's News Source" moniker.

As of March 3, 2021, CBS programming moved to KYES-LD and KTUU-DT5 (mapped as 5.11) as part of a major transmitter upgrade; the station's other subchannels are still in operation.

== History ==
Channel 5 signed on the air as KYES on January 21, 1990, as an independent before joining UPN in January 1995. It also had a secondary affiliation with The WB until that network launched The WB 100+ Station Group on September 21, 1998, in order to shift to cable-only distribution in smaller markets. In January 2006 it was announced that the WB and UPN were to merge operations in September 2006 to form The CW. The station was expected to become a CW affiliate, but on April 24 it was announced that The CW would be carried on a digital subchannel of ABC's Anchorage affiliate KIMO (channel 13, now KYUR). KYES instead became an affiliate of MyNetworkTV and one of only two in Alaska (former sister station K17HC in Juneau was the other); KFXF, the Fox affiliate in Fairbanks, declined an offer to air it as a secondary affiliation. The "-TV" suffix was added in 2007.

KYES's logo from the launch of MyNetworkTV in September 2006 until Gray's acquisition in the summer of 2016.

On October 1, 2015, Gray Television announced that it would acquire KYES-TV and four of its five translators from Fireweed Communications for $500,000, and apply for a "failing station" waiver from the Federal Communications Commission (FCC) so it could form a duopoly between KYES-TV and NBC affiliate KTUU, which Gray was acquiring as part of a separate transaction with Schurz Communications. Gray stated that it planned to invest in improving the quality of the station's services and programming.

The acquisition was opposed by GCI—the dominant cable provider in Alaska and owner of then-CBS affiliate KTVA (channel 11, now a PBS member station)–who filed a complaint to the FCC in December 2015. The company argued that the consolidation of KTUU and KYES would harm the ability for other stations to compete. Alaska state Attorney General Craig W. Richards also objected to the purchase, stating that such a consolidation would have the "potential for significant negative effects on competition in the small Anchorage DMA." Gray objected to GCI's claims, arguing that it was ironic for a "monopoly" utility company to "[allege] anti-competitive harms and serious threats to its impressive bottom line from the combination of KTUU, a strong station with an undisputed record of serving local communities, with [KYES], a weak station that has no local news, that hardly registers in ratings, and that GCI concedes has less than 5% of the local broadcast television advertising market," and that "GCI may need to increase its investments in KTVA to prevail in the marketplace over a new competitor in KYES-TV. Investments and competitive responses are precisely the types of benefits that the commission and the public want to see from broadcasters."

On June 17, 2016, the FCC approved the sale of the station to Gray, with the condition that the station would not enter (during two years post-consummation) into an affiliation agreement with a television network that would convert KYES into one of the top-four stations in audience share. The sale was completed on June 27, 2016. Prior to the sale, KYES was one of the few stand-alone, locally owned commercial television stations left in the United States. Immediately after, the station's logo was redesigned, and its MyNetworkTV affiliation was de-emphasized, as has become standard during MyNetworkTV's decline as solely a programming service with limited network imaging. Around the same time, KYES' translator in Juneau, KCBJ-LP (channel 15), took over for K17HC, which was retained by Fireweed, but went dark in 2017.

KYES's logo after becoming a CBS affiliate. The channel was moved to 5.11 in 2021.

On July 31, 2020, KYES-TV's main channel replaced KTVA as the CBS affiliate for Anchorage as Gray Television purchased the affiliation, along with other non-license assets, from the owner of KTVA, GCI subsidiary Denali Media Holdings. KYES-TV changed its on-air branding to CBS 5 Anchorage, and Gray also inherited KTVA's news operation and employees, along with its full slate of syndicated programming. The same day, KYES-TV's full former main channel schedule, including MyNetworkTV programming, was shifted to a newly-launched fourth subchannel. On September 3, GCI took KTVA dark, leaving KYES as the CBS affiliate for Anchorage. The call letters were changed to KAUU on February 26, 2021, with translator K22HN-D in Anchorage becoming KYES-LD.

== Newscasts ==
KAUU presently broadcasts 27 hours, 25 minutes of locally produced newscasts each week (with 5 hours, 5 minutes each weekday and one hour each on Saturdays and Sundays). The two-hour weekday newscast Morning Edition, first half of the long-running KTUU 6 p.m. NewsHour, and 10 p.m. late newscast are simulcast from KTUU. KAUU-exclusive newscasts air at noon (Alaska's first ever midday newscast), 4 p.m., and 5:30 p.m. following the CBS Evening News. All newscasts are branded as Alaska's News Source, KTUU's longtime news slogan.

In 1990, KYES-TV broadcast news from the USSR translated into English. It also aired Valley News, an independent production from Wasilla, Alaska, anchored by long-time Mat-Su Valley broadcaster Fred James. Until the Gray purchase, it ran Democracy Now! live (which in Alaska is at 4 a.m.), and carried France 24 on subchannel 5.4. After the Gray purchase, a repeat of KTUU's 5:30 a.m. newscast began airing at 7:30 a.m.

Following Gray's purchase of the non-license assets of KTVA, that station's news operation was inherited by KYES-TV; with its existing ownership of KTUU-TV, this gave Gray control of two news operations in the Anchorage market. KTVA newscasts were simulcast on KYES for a period in August, and the KYES logo aired on the news programming. On August 30, 2020, KTVA's news operation aired its final newscast from its facility. The next day, Gray Television launched Alaska's News Source, which hired 11 staffers from KTVA, and will act as a combined news operation for both KTUU and KYES. The combined newscasts began to air August 31, 2020.

== Technical information ==
=== Subchannels ===
The station's signal is multiplexed:

Subchannels of KAUU
Channel	Res.	Short name	Programming
5.2	480i	AntTV	Antenna TV
5.3	480i	OUTLAW	Outlaw
5.4	720p	MyNet	MyNetworkTV
5.5	480i	THE365	365BLK
5.6	480i	IONMyst	Ion Mystery

Since 2016, KAUU airs programming in high definition.

=== Analog-to-digital conversion ===
KAUU (as KYES-TV) signed on its digital signal on channel 22 with 20 watts of power on August 25, 2003—the first television station in the Anchorage market to have a digital signal, and the first in Alaska to offer high-definition television.

The means of getting the digital signal out, however, was extraordinary—KYES used a TTC 100-watt analog translator and a K-Tec digital exciter purchased on eBay, along with a temporary 30-foot (9.1 m) tower, originally used for an analog LPTV translator, on the roof of the hillside home of KYES' president and chief engineer manager, Jeremy Lansman. At only $5,000 to construct, it was sufficient to transmit a viewable digital signal throughout most of Anchorage, with the exception of the road to the town dump. KYES' initial digital programming included high-definition programming from HDNet and Wealth TV, along with an in-house audio music channel, rebroadcasts of KUDO-AM, KEUL FM and the Republic Broadcasting Network, and a standard-definition KYES broadcast.

KYES briefly included Retro Television Network in its digital lineup for a few days in January 2009. However, this was discontinued only days later on January 4, when the network was acquired by Luken Communications. No explanation has been given by KYES as to why the programming was discontinued, though the reason was likely technical involving Alaska's geography, rather than directly involving the dispute between Luken and its former owners, Equity Broadcasting that ensued in the Lower 48. Equity's satellite setup had RTN uplinked from Galaxy 18 at 123° West. When Luken acquired the network, it was moved to AMC-9 at 83° West, an orbital location below the horizon from Anchorage.

The channel 22 signal was then licensed as K22HN (now KYES-LD) and operates at 2.8 kW ERP. KYES is authorized by the FCC to broadcast digital signals via VHF channel 5, broadcasting up to 45 kW. Thus, it has duplicate VHF and UHF signals.

In a DTV transition status report (FCC Form 387) filed by the station on October 7, 2008, Jeremy Lansman of KYES described the station's digital readiness:

The form asks: "licensee/permittee has other needs that must be addressed before it can fully construct and operate its post-transition facility. (if checked, explain.)"

1. Reliability and quality of using 1970's Harris transmitting gear is unknown.
2. No equipment is available to accurately measure DTV or ACLR power.
3. The 8VSB signal will originate at K22HN. Reliability of reception of the 8VSB signal is unknown, though it seems to work in spite of two path terrain obstacles.
4. Electricity supplies are unreliable at both sites; Hillside where K22HN will originate 8VSB signals for the region, and Eagle River where KYES-DT will translate those signals. Both sites are subject to winds in excess of 100 mph. Serial retransmission will compound the probability of off air time. The station needs back up generators, but has no money for one, no less two. Public safety will be compromised after the analog signal is switched off due to lack of back up power.

For example, power at K22HN failed last night (Oct 10, 2008) shortly after 4.30 am. It is still off as of this time, 6 pm. As a result, KYES has had no DTV signal at all for over 12 hours. This will not be a unique experience. The analog signal originates from a UPS-protected studio. the 8VSB signal is encoded at K22HN.

The FCC form asks what is needed. The answer? Funds from the spectrum auction as made possible by this conversion to DTV, said funds to be applied to equipment that may be needed, especially by stations in financial distress. Dumpster diving may result in an 8VSB signal, but the result will be less than ideal.

The document then goes on to cite an Anchorage Daily News article, explaining that a storm and 100 mph (161 km/h) winds had knocked out power in the area, taking K22HN dark, suggesting that the station's DTV status reports were filed without the aid of electricity.

Fireweed Communications LLC then requested FCC authorization to operate KYES-DT post-transition from multiple transmitter sites. The existing UHF 22 DTV facility would continue operation, and multiple transmitters would rebroadcast the signal onto the former analog channel (5) using the existing KYES low-power television facilities.

While the cash-strapped station expected this would allow rapid and less costly construction and provide replication of analog service, this was not a request for a DTx (distributed transmission system). The transmitters were not synchronous, and therefore could interfere with each other in certain narrow geographical areas. The affected locations were all unpopulated.

KAUU (as KYES-TV) shut down its analog signal, over VHF channel 5, on June 13, 2009. The station's digital signal relocated from its pre-transition VHF channel 6 to channel 5. In 2019, KAUU (as KYES-TV)'s transmitter was moved to the same tower as KTUU's as part of the FCC's spectrum re-allocation and an overall want by Gray to combine transmission facilities between the two stations. KAUU (as KYES) also shifted to physical channel 7, which due to its high-VHF location had better overall reception and antenna compatibility than its former low-band VHF channel 5.

== See also ==
- KNIK-LD
- Hawaii News Now (a combined news operation for sister stations KGMB and KHNL in Honolulu, Hawaii)
