= KATH-LD =

Television station in Juneau–Douglas, Alaska

- Juneau–Douglas, Alaska; United States
- City: Juneau, Alaska
- Channels: Digital: 35 (UHF); Virtual: 2
- Branding: KATH 2 Alaska

Programming
- Affiliations: 2.1: NBC; 2.2: Heroes & Icons

Ownership
- Owner: Gray Media; (Gray Television Licensee, LLC)
- Sister stations: KYEX-LD

History
- First air date: August 17, 1998
- Former call signs: K05JR (1998–2001); KATH-LP (2001–2011)
- Former channel numbers: Analog: 5 (VHF, 1998–2011); Virtual: 5 (2011–2020)
- Former affiliations: The WB (secondary, 1998–1999); UPN (secondary)
- Call sign meaning: Former owner's wife's name is Kathy

Technical information
- Licensing authority: FCC
- Facility ID: 188833
- Class: LD
- ERP: 0.1 kW; 0.13 kW (CP)
- HAAT: −377.9 m (−1,240 ft); −302.9 m (−994 ft) (CP)
- Transmitter coordinates: 58°17′58.8″N 134°25′26″W; 58°18′4″N 134°26′32″W (CP)

Links
- Public license information: LMS
- Website: alaskasnewssource.com

KSCT-LD
Translator of KATH-LD
- Sitka, Alaska; United States
- Channels: Digital: 5 (VHF); Virtual: 2

Programming
- Affiliations: 2.1: NBC; 5.1: CBS; 5.4: MyNetworkTV

History
- First air date: May 1, 1995
- Former call signs: K05KH (May–November 1995)
- Former channel numbers: Analog: 5 (VHF, 1995–2018)
- Former affiliations: Fox (1995–1998); The WB (secondary, 1995–1999)
- Call sign meaning: Sitka Community Television

Technical information
- Licensing authority: FCC
- Facility ID: 15348
- Class: LD
- ERP: 0.619 kW
- HAAT: 23.1 m (76 ft)
- Transmitter coordinates: 57°3′1″N 135°20′7.9″W

Links
- Public license information: LMS

KATH-LD (channel 2) is a low-power television station licensed to both Juneau and Douglas, Alaska, United States, affiliated with NBC. The station is owned by Gray Media and maintains a transmitter in downtown Juneau.

KSCT-LD (channel 5) in Sitka is a translator of KATH-LD, broadcasting from a transmitter in downtown Sitka. Programming is identical to KATH-LD with both stations being fed from the studios of sister station KTUU-TV (channel 2) in Anchorage. KSCT-LD additionally carries CBS and MyNetworkTV programming on subchannels.

On cable, KATH-LD is carried on GCI in Juneau on channel 15, on Dish Network throughout Southeast Alaska on channels 5 and 9380, and DirecTV throughout Southeast Alaska on channel 4. KATH-LD's high definition feed is also available on GCI's basic service on digital channel 652 in Juneau, Sitka, Ketchikan, Petersburg and Wrangell. KATH-LD's standard-definition signal is also on GCI cable in Petersburg, Wrangell and Angoon. Daily Alaska news is provided through a partnership with KTUU-TV.

== History ==
KSCT-LP was the first of the two stations to go on the air, signing on May 1, 1995, as a Fox affiliate owned by Dan Etulain, who previously owned KTNL (channel 13) from 1983 to 1992. KSCT-LP had operated as a cable-only station since December 9, 1994; during that period, Fox's primetime programming was seen in the afternoon, though it was moved into primetime concurrently with channel 5's sign on. KSCT-LP affiliated with Fox because, at the time, it was the only one of the Big Four television networks that was willing to affiliate with low-power television stations. Initially, most of KSCT-LP's non-Fox programming was supplied by National Empowerment Television, though it also broadcast some local programming; after NET moved to a satellite that the station could not receive, its programming was replaced with Channel America, Outdoor Channel, and American Independent Network on December 1, 1995. By this time, KSCT-LP had added a secondary affiliation with The WB. The station was originally assigned the call letters K05KH; it officially became KSCT-LP on November 20, 1995, though it had promoted itself as "KSCT" since its launch.

In June 1998, Etulain announced that he would launch KATH-LP as Juneau's NBC affiliate that July; KSCT-LP had switched to NBC by this time as well. Delays in receiving equipment required to place the station on GCI's lineup postponed the launch of the station to August 17, 1998. NBC programming was previously only available in Juneau via cable carriage of Seattle's KING-TV; however, KING was not carried on the basic cable tier, unlike KATH-LP. KATH-LP supplemented NBC programming with blocks of local programming, which generally consisted of pre-recorded coverage of community events and high school sports; at its launch, the station did not air any local newscasts. Juneau's existing stations, ABC affiliate KJUD (channel 8) and PBS station KTOO-TV (channel 3), were at the time part of the statewide Alaska's SuperStation and AlaskaOne networks respectively, with limited local programming. Shortly after KATH-LP's launch, Etulain purchased K05JR, which had been licensed in 1994; the sale was completed on May 26, 1999. K05JR and KSCT-LP continued their secondary WB affiliations until early 1999; at that time, K05JR added a secondary UPN affiliation. K05JR's call sign was changed to KATH-LP on November 15, 2001; it had been calling itself "KATH" on the air since its sale to Etulain. By early 2003, KATH-LP was simulcasting local newscasts from KTUU-TV in Anchorage. KATH-LD ended analog over-the-air broadcasts in November 2011.

On November 9, 2012, GCI, through subsidiary Denali Media Holdings, announced plans to purchase KATH-LD and KSCT-LP from Dan Etulain's North Star Television Network, along with KTVA in Anchorage from MediaNews Group. The Federal Communications Commission (FCC) approved the deal on October 29, 2013. KATH-LD's news partnership with KTUU-TV was suspended on December 7, 2013, as a result of a larger dispute between GCI and KTUU, but a deal to resume it was reached on February 6, 2014.

KSCT-LP began broadcasting a digital over-the-air TV signal in January 2018.

Denali Media Holdings announced the sale of KATH-LD and KSCT-LP to Gray Television on May 28, 2020. The sale made KATH-LD and KSCT-LP sister stations to KTUU-TV and KYES-TV in Anchorage and KTVF in Fairbanks, and gave Gray a monopoly on NBC programming throughout Alaska. The sale was completed on July 31.

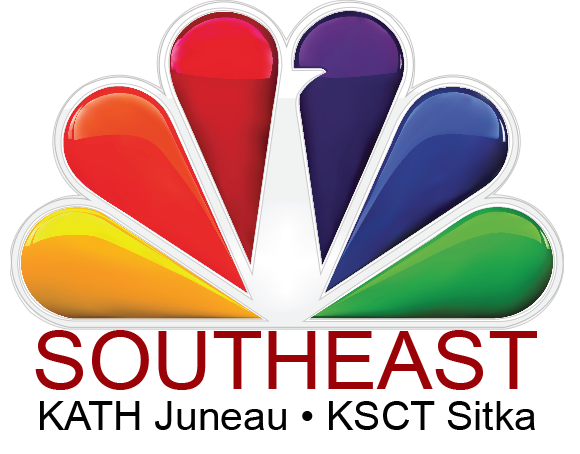
Former logo of KATH-LD

== Subchannels ==
=== KATH-LD subchannel ===
Subchannel of KATH-LD
Subchannel	Res.	Short name	Programming
2.1	1080i	KATH	NBC
2.2	480i	KATHHnI	Heroes & Icons

=== KSCT-LD subchannels ===
Subchannels of KSCT-LD
Subchannel	Short name	Programming
2.1	KUBD	NBC
5.1	KYES-HD	CBS
5.4	MyNet	MyNetworkTV (KAUU)
