= GCI Communication =

Telecommunications corporation operating in Alaska

GCI Communication Corp
- Type: Subsidiary
- Industry: Telecommunications
- Predecessor: Liberty Media
- Founded: 1979; 47 years ago
- Headquarters: Anchorage, Alaska
- Products: Broadband; Fixed telephony; Mobile telephony
- Number of employees: 1,800 (2023)
- Parent: Liberty Capital Corporation
- Website: www.gci.com

GCI Communication Corp (GCI) is an Alaska-based telecommunications corporation. Through its own facilities and agreements with other providers, GCI provides Internet access, landline, and cellular telephone service. It is a subsidiary of Liberty Capital Corporation.

== History ==
GCI was founded in 1979 by Ron Duncan and Bob Walp. On November 10, 2005, the company reported third-quarter profits of $2.3 million, down from $9.3 million during the same three months of 2004.

In November 2024, Liberty Broadband announced that GCI would be spun off to its shareholders, as part of plans for the parent company to be acquired by Charter Communications. GCI was spun-off as a wholly owned subsidiary of a new holding company called GCI Liberty, Inc. in July 2025. In May 2026, GCI's parent company rebranded to Liberty Capital Corporation.

== Products ==
=== Television ===
GCI formerly provided cable television service to approximately three-quarters of Alaska residents. GCI upgraded most of its network to support digital cable broadcasts and provided high-definition broadcasts in some of the state's larger cities. GCI leased an array of analog and digital cable boxes, including HD and DVR digital cable boxes, to its customers. In 2008, GCI discontinued analog cable service to Anchorage residences, moving to a fully digital platform.

GCI launched Yukon TV, a OTT streaming service, in November 2020, which required a customer to subscribe to GCI's internet service. In December 2021, GCI announced that it would discontinue cable TV service in the majority of its markets, including all urban markets, in favor of Yukon TV. It would continue to provide cable service in some rural Alaskan communities, including Bethel and Dillingham, which are not connected to GCI's fiber network.

GCI also provided content to the state-operated Alaska Rural Communications Service satellite system, which in turn provided free over-the-air broadcasts of commercial and public television programs to 235 rural Alaskan communities.

On November 9, 2012, GCI announced plans to purchase KTVA, a CBS-affiliated television station in Anchorage, along with KATH-LD and KSCT-LP, the NBC-affiliated stations in Southeast Alaska. On December 9, 2013, GCI filed to acquire the CBS affiliates in Southeast Alaska—KXLJ-LD in Juneau, KTNL-TV in Sitka, and KUBD in Ketchikan. On July 31, 2020, GCI announced its intent to exit the television business and sold the non-license assets of KTVA to Gray Television.

In November 2024, GCI announced that it would discontinue all television services by mid-2025, citing that customers "increasingly choose online video streaming as their preferred way to watch their favorite programming". GCI will direct customers to other platforms, particularly Xumo.

Beginning June 15, 2025, GCI began shutting down Yukon TV after receiving regulatory approval from the Regulatory Commission of Alaska on May 5, 2025.

=== Internet ===
GCI provides access to the Internet via multiple means. As of January 2015, GCI provides cable modem services in major cities in Alaska with download speeds up to 250 megabits per second or Mbps (re:D Plan). In mid 2015 GCI will be deploying its fiber re:D network in the Anchorage area first, with download speeds up to 1 gigabit per second(1,000 Mbit/s). To start that campaign, GCI has increased its highest home internet plan (re:D) from 50MMbps to 100 Mbit/s and then to 250 Mbit/s for free in all available areas that has access to the re:D plan. The re:D plan is currently to this date $174.99 and when the re:D 1 Gbit/s Fiber network launches, the price will remain the same. In the rural cities of Nome, Cordova, Bethel, and Utqiaġvik, GCI provides high-speed cable modem services but uses a satellite for the backhaul connection, as the cost to lay cable to these remote areas is prohibitively expensive. In some rural communities where GCI does not have a cable TV infrastructure, it provides lower-bandwidth (56-512 kbit/s) wireless Internet access over a satellite backhaul.

Through its own facilities and agreements with other providers, primarily Alaska Communications Systems, GCI provides data network and Internet connections via GPON DSL, PRI leased lines (such as a T1), and other high-bandwidth business-class products. These services are aimed at the business market. The state government is a major customer of GCI, using GCI's infrastructure to provide the backbone for the state's wide area network.

GCI maintains local access numbers throughout the state for analog dial-up service. GCI however no longer offers dial up service to customer accounts, but will continue to support customers who are grandfathered into the service.

GCI also owns Alaska United fiber optic cable system, which connects Anchorage and Fairbanks with Internet points of presence in Seattle and Portland. GCI leases capacity on their system to other Internet providers in Alaska, including Clearwire wireless broadband.

=== Landline ===
GCI offers local telephone service in many Alaskan markets, as well as intrastate and interstate long-distance. As the competitive local exchange carrier, GCI primarily contracts with the incumbent local exchange carrier, Alaska Communications Systems, to provide the local loop from GCI's switches to customers. (This practice is known as UNE-loop.)

GCI is currently deploying digital cable telephony based on PacketCable technology in Utqiaġvik as a replacement for the analog copper. In GCI's implementation, the connection between the GCI head end and the subscriber's EMTA uses IP packets but is interconnected with GCI's more traditional circuit-switched infrastructure and backbone.

GCI also provides legacy as well as Cisco VoIP telephony for many customers, including the state government.

=== Wireless telephone ===
Through an agreement with Dobson Communications Systems, which provided TDMA and GSM cellular service under the Cellular One brand, GCI formerly sold GSM cellular service under its own name while providing Dobson with the back-end network infrastructure. AT&T's purchase of Dobson, however, resulted in an agreement on December 3, 2007, that released Dobson, now under the AT&T Wireless brand, from its contract to use GCI for its back-end network on July 1, 2008; AT&T Wireless now uses existing AT&T Alascom networks. GCI will continue to contract with AT&T Wireless for the use and resale of its products and services through June 30, 2012, but will also invest $100 million in its own network. It also plans to spend approximately $10 million to complete its acquisition of the remaining 20% of Alaska DigiTel, a competing CDMA-based cellular carrier. On December 4, 2014, GCI agreed to purchase the wireless assets of Alaska Communications for $300 million. The deal is expected to close in the first quarter of 2015.

==== Radio frequency spectrum chart ====
The following chart describes radio frequency spectrum bands accessible by the company's customers.

Frequency Band	Band number	Protocol	Generation	Status	Notes
1.9 GHz PCS	2	GSM/GPRS/EDGE	2G	Active/Refarming to LTE	
850 MHz CLR	5	GSM/GPRS/EDGE	2G	Active/Refarming to LTE	
1.9 GHz PCS	2	UMTS/HSPA+	3G	Active/Refarming to LTE	
850 MHz CLR	5	UMTS/HSPA+	3G	Active/Refarming to LTE	
700 MHz Lower SMH A Block	12	LTE/LTE-A	4G	Active	
850 MHz CLR	5/26	LTE/LTE-A	4G	Active	
1.9 GHz PCS	2/25	LTE/LTE-A	4G	Active	
1.7/2.1 GHz AWS	4/66	LTE/LTE-A	4G	Active	
600 MHz DD	n71	NR	5G	Active	
24 GHz K-band	n258	NR	5G	Spectrum acquired	
39 GHz Ka-band	n260	NR	5G	Spectrum acquired	
47 GHz V-band	n262	NR	5G	Spectrum acquired	

== See also ==
- List of United States telephone companies
- Other cable based services
- 2010 Alaska Turbo Otter crash
