= KYUR =

Television station in Anchorage, Alaska

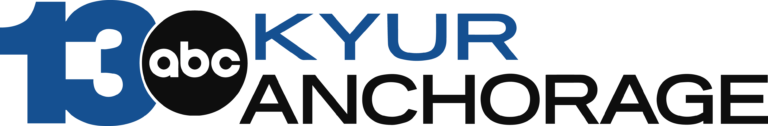

- Anchorage, Alaska; United States
- Channels: Digital: 12 (VHF); Virtual: 13
- Branding: ABC 13; The CW Alaska (13.2); Your Alaska Link (newscasts)

Programming
- Affiliations: 13.1: ABC; 13.2: The CW Plus; 13.3: Fox (KTBY)

Ownership
- Owner: Vision Alaska LLC; (KYUR License LLC)
- Operator: Coastal Television Broadcasting Company LLC
- Sister stations: KTBY, KATN, KJUD

History
- First air date: October 31, 1967
- Former call signs: KHAR-TV (1967–1971); KIMO (1971–2010)
- Former channel numbers: Analog: 13 (VHF, 1967–2009)
- Former affiliations: Independent (1967–1971)
- Call sign meaning: "Your Alaska Link"

Technical information
- Licensing authority: FCC
- Facility ID: 13815
- ERP: 41 kW
- HAAT: 240 m (787 ft)
- Transmitter coordinates: 61°25′19.8″N 149°52′27.8″W
- Translator(s): K03FW-D Kenai, etc.; K13TR-D Homer; K35NZ-D Ninilchik

Links
- Public license information: Public file; LMS
- Website: youralaskalink.com

KYUR (channel 13) is a television station in Anchorage, Alaska, United States, affiliated with ABC and The CW Plus. It is owned by Vision Alaska LLC and operated by Coastal Television Broadcasting Company LLC alongside Fox affiliate KTBY (channel 4). The two stations share studios on East Tudor Road in Anchorage; KYUR's transmitter is located in the Matanuska-Susitna Borough. KYUR and KTBY, alongside KATN in Fairbanks and KJUD in Juneau, provide ABC, Fox, and CW programming throughout Alaska.

Channel 13 went on the air on October 31, 1967, as KHAR-TV, the third TV station in Anchorage. It was owned alongside radio station KHAR by Bill Harpel, who died three months later. As an independent station without network affiliation and reliant on movies, KHAR-TV struggled, and it left the air in May 1970. It signed back on four months later after Central Alaska Broadcasting agreed to buy the station. After the sale closed in 1971, the call sign changed to KIMO, and a federal rule change spurred ABC to affiliate with channel 13. During the late 1970s and early 1980s, KIMO enjoyed a run as the leading news station in Anchorage and was credited with raising the quality of television newscasting in the local market. Its owners acquired KJUD and KATN in 1983 and 1984, respectively, creating a statewide broadcaster known as the Alaska Television Network.

After lead anchor John Vallentine departed in 1985, the station's news ratings declined, and KTUU-TV (channel 2) established itself as the market leader. The owners took out an $11 million loan in 1988 to buy out other shareholders and make capital improvements; when the national television advertising market and the Alaskan economy contracted simultaneously, a receiver was appointed to run the Alaska Television Network stations. Smith Broadcasting Group bought the stations in 1995 and consolidated news and programming functions in Anchorage, integrating the three ABC affiliates into a statewide setup known as "Alaska's SuperStation". Vision Alaska bought the stations in 2010, bringing them under common management with Coastal's KTBY. News ratings remained low, and in 2020 the entire news staff was fired, with much of the station's news output outsourced.

== History ==
Interest in establishing a third television station in Anchorage emerged as early as 1958. Anchorage radio station KBYR was the first to file for the channel in October of that year, and KBYR-TV received a construction permit in October 1960.

=== KHAR-TV: Early years ===
The next group to file for channel 13—still unused years after KBYR's first attempt—was Willis R. "Bill" Harpel, owner of Anchorage radio station KHAR, in March 1965. Harpel believed Anchorage had grown enough to support a third station that would operate as an independent station. The Federal Communications Commission (FCC) granted Harpel the construction permit on November 22, 1965; he initially promised the station would open in mid-1966, but construction did not take place until mid-1967. That August, the antenna for the station was raised to KHAR's tower on the Seward Highway.

KHAR-TV debuted on October 31, 1967, with a Halloween movie feature. It featured a daily early evening newscast, movies, and syndicated programs, but it lacked network affiliation. Harpel had been turned down by the Big Three networks, all of which were represented in Anchorage: KTVA (channel 11) was the CBS affiliate, and KENI-TV (channel 2, now KTUU-TV) aired ABC and NBC programs. Less than three months after channel 13's first broadcast, Bill Harpel died in the Anchorage area's first fatal snowmobile accident on January 13, 1968, aged 46.

After Bill Harpel's death, Sourdough Broadcasters acquired the KHAR stations. While the AM and FM operations thrived, channel 13 struggled. It had no network programming other than Sesame Street, which aired by special arrangement with National Educational Television. In late 1969, the FCC approved the sale of the KHAR stations to Alaska-Hawaii Radio, but the potential buyers soon lost interest, and the deal fell apart. With no buyer, no affiliation, and mounting losses, KHAR-TV shut down on May 15, 1970.

=== KIMO: ABC affiliation and news maturation ===
Carl Bracale, the last employee of KHAR-TV, managed to gather a group of people interested in buying the television station and returning it to air. The group organized as Central Alaska Broadcasting in August 1970 and made an advance to Sourdough Broadcasters to put KHAR-TV back on the air pending a sale. The station resumed broadcasting on September 6 with a program schedule primarily consisting of movies and some syndicated shows. After receiving FCC approval, the sale was completed on June 25, 1971; the last change in connection with the sale was the adoption of new KIMO call letters.

In the meantime, a federal rule change provided the station the network affiliation it had sought. In March 1971, the FCC prevented a VHF station from holding two or more network affiliations in a market with three or more full-power stations, if one of which did not have an affiliation. While written in the wake of problems facing UHF stations in North Carolina and Georgia, it also applied to cases like Anchorage, where one VHF station (KENI-TV) had two affiliations and another had none at all. KENI-TV chose to retain NBC and signed an exclusive agreement with the network that May. While KENI-TV announced that channel 13 (still KHAR-TV at the time) would become the ABC affiliate with this move, the station did not sign an affiliation agreement until September, after it had become KIMO. In time for the 1972 Summer Olympics, KIMO opened its own tape center in Seattle to furnish the station with recordings of network broadcasts; this allowed for next-day broadcasting of sporting events instead of on a seven-day delay.

During the late 1970s and early 1980s, under news director and anchor John Vallentine, KIMO was credited with initiating major improvements in television newscasting in Anchorage. Under Vallentine, KIMO's Action News 13 moved on from the days when it shot newsfilm on home movie cameras and moved to the top of the ratings, commanding viewer shares of 40 percent or greater in the early 1980s. The station expanded out of the Seward Highway facility and into production and sales offices on Tudor Street, later moving the entire station to Tudor in 1983. In 1984, as networks began to use satellites that included Alaska in their footprint, KIMO became the second station in Anchorage to begin same-day broadcasting by satellite of all network programs, having unexpectedly been beaten by KTUU.

KIMO's ownership expanded into television interests beyond Anchorage in the early 1980s. The Alaska 13 Corporation, KIMO's parent company, acquired KINY-TV (channel 8), the NBC affiliate in Juneau; it became a primary ABC affiliate as KJUD on January 24, 1983. The company held a permit to build channel 13 in Fairbanks as an ABC affiliate; in light of the down economy and fearing it could not survive the addition of a third commercial station there, KTUU instead sold its existing station there, KTTU (channel 2), in 1984. That station changed its call sign to KATN and became a joint ABC–NBC affiliate.

Vallentine departed Anchorage in 1985 to take a job with WISN-TV in Milwaukee. Toward the end of his tenure, KIMO's news lead started to erode; in the November 1984 sweeps period, KTUU outrated KIMO in evening news for the first time in at least 10 years. Also in 1985, KIMO canceled its morning show; KTUU hired its host, Maria Downey, who became the lead female anchor at channel 2 for three decades. KIMO's decline accelerated after 1985; KTUU surged in the ratings beginning in 1986, leaving KIMO and KTVA to fight among themselves for second and third place. Vallentine made a brief return between 1988 and 1989, but KTUU moved its main news to 6 p.m., at the same time as KIMO, and ratings continued to sink to a 16 percent share in November 1989.

Vallentine's brief return coincided with changes in the ownership of the Alaska Television Network stations as several stakeholders were bought out. After the board of directors was replaced in 1988, the new ownership invested $1 million in a new transmitter and other equipment, $1 million in new syndicated programming, and $1 million in personnel. To fund the buyouts and this expansion, the network took out an $11 million loan from Greyhound Financial of Phoenix, Arizona. By the early 1990s, KIMO and its sister stations were suffering from a national downturn in television advertising as well as a struggling Alaska economy. KIMO was fighting Fox affiliate KTBY (channel 4) to maintain third place in overall ratings and shifting to emphasize statewide news coverage over newscasts focusing on Anchorage. Former employees attributed the station's struggles to poor management decisions, such as the acquisition of the stations outside Anchorage, the purchase of the Tudor Road studios, and the choice of low-quality Super VHS cameras instead of industry-standard formats. After debt renegotiation talks with Greyhound failed, the parties agreed to place the Alaska Television Network into receivership in January 1993; Greyhound named Cookerly Communications, a Maryland-based consulting firm, to manage the stations.

=== Smith Broadcasting ownership ===
In 1994, a bankruptcy court approved Greyhound Financial to seek buyers for the Alaska Television Network. None came forward, so the bankruptcy judge awarded the stations to Greyhound for $8 million. Smith Broadcasting Group of Santa Barbara, California, agreed to buy the Alaska Television Network stations in late 1995. It immediately sought to reconfigure the stations into one programming service, known as "Alaska's SuperStation"; it bought a satellite transponder and began the process of phasing in a single program schedule, though existing syndicated program contracts required variations in each market.

The news department structure was overhauled. In March 1996, KIMO replaced its existing 5 p.m. news, which had last drawn five percent of the audience, and debuted a new 6 p.m. newscast, NewsLink Alaska. Airing opposite KTUU's early evening news, it emphasized statewide news and initially featured local news opt-outs for the Fairbanks and Juneau areas. That August, news was consolidated, replaced with a statewide newscast produced in Anchorage.

For viewers outside Anchorage, the reorganization of the ABC affiliates as Alaska's SuperStation meant that KATN and KJUD adopted the scheduling practices of KIMO. This included the tape-delaying of Monday Night Football. For years after the introduction of same-day satellite sports service to Alaska, KIMO delayed MNF several hours to run in prime time, when it believed there were more available viewers. The station pursued legal action against local sports bars that aired the live satellite feed starting at 5 p.m. Alaska Time to protect its advertisers; it only began allowing them to show the game live to their patrons starting with the 1997 season if they paid an annual fee to the station. Sports fans in Juneau were upset when KJUD, which had previously aired MNF live, switched to tape delay in 1996. In 2004, KIMO began airing Monday Night Football live, though the second half was delayed by several minutes to allow the station to insert an extended halftime news update. Even then, football problems persisted. In 1999, the station withdrew from the Alaska Rural Communications Service, which provides network programming to the Alaskan Bush, because of a compensation dispute. As a result, Super Bowl XXXVII and Super Bowl XL, which were aired by ABC, were not available in many Bush communities.

In 2004, KIMO became the advertising sales partner of The WB 100+ Station Group, the cable-only WB network service that had been absent in much of Alaska until that time due to a contract dispute with cable provider GCI. Anchorage was delayed in getting digital television due to geographic considerations and a failure to secure a site for a joint transmission facility. In the case of KIMO, the station had to ask the FCC to assign a VHF channel instead of a UHF channel. KIMO's digital signal was on air by late 2005; the station shut down its analog signal on June 12, 2009, the official digital television transition date, and continued to broadcast in digital on its pre-transition VHF channel 12.

=== Coastal operation ===
Smith sold KIMO and the remainder of the "ABC Alaska's SuperStation" system to Vision Alaska LLC in 2010. When the sale was completed, on May 13, 2010, Coastal Television Broadcasting Company LLC (which owns KTBY) entered into joint sales and shared services agreements with Vision Alaska to operate KIMO, and both stations moved into the same building. On January 1, 2011, KIMO changed its call letters to KYUR; the change eliminated the KIMO call sign and its reference to the now-outdated term Eskimo. Coastal initially invested in expanding the headcount of its Anchorage operation, though late news ratings remained far behind the other stations: in February 2015, the KYUR late news had a rating of 0.44 compared to KTVA (2.9) and KTUU (11.2).

On April 1, 2020, as a result of impending economic concerns caused by the COVID-19 pandemic, Coastal dismissed the entire news staff of KTBY and KYUR and replaced the news department with inserts into the national NewsNet. The company intended to have news segments for Alaska anchored by Maria Athens and produced at KTWO-TV in Casper, Wyoming, which it acquired that same year. However, Athens was still working out of Anchorage when she was fired in October 2020 following a physical altercation with the general manager. It was also revealed she had an inappropriate sexting relationship with Anchorage mayor Ethan Berkowitz, who resigned as a result.

== Notable former on-air staff ==
- John Seibel — sportscaster

== Subchannels ==
KYUR broadcasts from the Knik TV Mast in the Matanuska-Susitna Borough. The station's signal is multiplexed:

Subchannels of KYUR
Subchannel	Res.	Short name	Programming
13.1	720p	KYUR-DT	ABC
13.2	720p	KYUR CW	The CW Plus
13.3	480i	KYURFOX	Fox (KTBY) in SD

Simulcast of subchannels of another station
