= Knik-Fairview, Alaska =

- Census-designated place
- Location of Knik-Fairview in Matanuska-Susitna Borough and the state of Alaska

- Location within the state of Alaska
- Coordinates: 61°31′39″N 149°35′53″W
- Country: United States
- State: Alaska
- Borough: Matanuska-Susitna

Government
  - Borough mayor: Edna DeVries
  - State senators: Shelley Hughes (R); Mike Shower (R); David Wilson (R)
  - State reps.: David Eastman (R); Kevin McCabe (R); Cathy Tilton (R)

Area
  - Total: 74.55 sq mi (193.08 km^{2})
  - Land: 73.53 sq mi (190.45 km^{2})
  - Water: 1.01 sq mi (2.62 km^{2})

Population (2020)
  - Total: 19,297
  - Rank: 4th
  - Density: 262.4/sq mi (101.32/km^{2})
- Time zone: UTC-9 (Alaska (AKST))
  - Summer (DST): UTC-8 (AKDT)
- Area code: 907
- FIPS code: 02-40645

Knik-Fairview is a census-designated place (CDP) in Matanuska-Susitna Borough, Alaska, United States. It is part of the Anchorage, Alaska Metropolitan Statistical Area. At the 2020 census the population was 19,297, up from 14,923 in 2010. It is the most populated CDP in Alaska.

== Geography ==
Knik-Fairview is located at 61°31′39″N 149°35′53″W. 17.5 miles (28.2 km) northeast of Anchorage on the west bank of the Knik Arm of Cook Inlet, 13 miles south of Wasilla.

According to the United States Census Bureau, the CDP has a total area of 180 km^{2} (69 sq mi). Two percent, or 1 square mile (2.6 km^{2}), of it is water.

== Demographics ==
Historical population
Census	Pop.	Note	%±
1910	118		—
1920	40		−66.1%
1930	34		−15.0%
1940	40		17.6%
1950	33		−17.5%
1960	29		−12.1%
1970	19		−34.5%
1980	10		−47.4%
1990	272		2,620.0%
2000	7,049		2,491.5%
2010	14,923		111.7%
2020	19,297		29.3%
U.S. Decennial Census

Knik-Fairview first appeared on the 1910 U.S. Census as the unincorporated village of Knik. It appeared again from 1920–40. Knik did not appear again until 1980, when it was classified as a native village with just 10 residents. In 1990, it was reclassified as a census-designated place (CDP). In 2000, it was renamed Knik-Fairview (CDP).

=== 2020 census ===
As of the 2020 census, Knik-Fairview had a population of 19,297. The median age was 32.9 years. 30.8% of residents were under the age of 18 and 10.0% of residents were 65 years of age or older. For every 100 females there were 106.8 males, and for every 100 females age 18 and over there were 106.5 males age 18 and over.

51.8% of residents lived in urban areas, while 48.2% lived in rural areas.

There were 6,592 households in Knik-Fairview, of which 41.0% had children under the age of 18 living in them. Of all households, 57.2% were married-couple households, 18.1% were households with a male householder and no spouse or partner present, and 16.3% were households with a female householder and no spouse or partner present. About 19.1% of all households were made up of individuals and 5.7% had someone living alone who was 65 years of age or older.

There were 7,315 housing units, of which 9.9% were vacant. The homeowner vacancy rate was 3.2% and the rental vacancy rate was 8.5%.

Racial composition as of the 2020 census
Race	Number	Percent
White	14,655	75.9%
Black or African American	178	0.9%
American Indian and Alaska Native	1,257	6.5%
Asian	309	1.6%
Native Hawaiian and Other Pacific Islander	94	0.5%
Some other race	357	1.9%
Two or more races	2,447	12.7%
Hispanic or Latino (of any race)	1,037	5.4%

=== 2000 census ===
As of the 2000 census, there were 7,050 people, 2,380 households, and 1,800 families residing in the CDP. The population density was 39/km^{2} (100/sq mi). There were 2,590 housing units at an average density of 37/sq mi (14/km^{2}). The racial makeup of the CDP was 88% white, 6% Native American, and 4% from two or more races. 3% of the population were Hispanic or Latino of any race. Blacks, Asians, and Pacific Islanders all had less than 1%. 1% were from other races.

There were 2,380 households, out of which 45% had children under the age of 18 living with them, 64% were married couples living together, 7% had a female householder with no husband present, and 24% were non-families. 18% of all households were made up of individuals, and 3% had someone living alone who was 65 years of age or older. The average household size was 3.0 and the average family size was 3.4.

In the CDP, the population was spread out, with 34% under the age of 18, 6% from 18 to 24, 33% from 25 to 44, 23% from 45 to 64, and 5% who were 65 years of age or older. The median age was 33 years. For every 100 females, there were 108 males. For every 100 females age 18 and over, there were 107 males.

The median income for a household in the CDP was $52,100, and the median income for a family was $60,100. Males had a median income of $46,300 versus $29,800 for females. The per capita income for the CDP was $20,900. 11% of the population and 9% of families were below the poverty line. 13% of those under the age of 18 and 4% of those 65 and older were living below the poverty line.
