= KJUD =

Television station in Juneau, Alaska

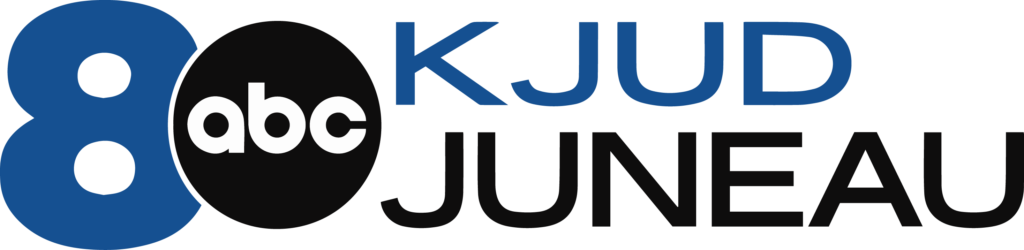
- Juneau, Alaska; United States
- Channels: Digital: 11 (VHF); Virtual: 8
- Branding: ABC 8; The CW Alaska (8.2); Fox Alaska (8.3); Your Alaska Link (newscasts)

Programming
- Affiliations: 8.1: ABC; 8.2: CW+; 8.3: Fox; for others, see § Subchannels

Ownership
- Owner: Vision Alaska LLC; (KATN and KJUD License LLC)
- Sister stations: KATN, KTBY, KYUR

History
- First air date: February 19, 1956
- Former call signs: KINY-TV (1956–1983)
- Former channel numbers: Analog: 8 (VHF, 1956–2009)
- Former affiliations: CBS/NBC (1956–?); NTA (secondary, 1956–1961)
- Call sign meaning: Juneau and Douglas

Technical information
- Licensing authority: FCC
- Facility ID: 13814
- ERP: 0.14 kW
- HAAT: −290 m (−951 ft)
- Transmitter coordinates: 58°18′4″N 134°26′32″W
- Translator(s): K13OC-D Douglas, etc.

Links
- Public license information: Public file; LMS
- Website: www.youralaskalink.com

KJUD (channel 8) is a television station in Juneau, Alaska, United States, affiliated with ABC, The CW Plus, and Fox. Owned by Vision Alaska LLC, the station maintains a transmitter along Douglas Highway in West Juneau. Master control and some internal operations are based at the facilities of fellow ABC affiliate and Your Alaska Link flagship KYUR in Anchorage.

== History ==
KINY-TV, Juneau's first television station, signed on the air on February 19, 1956, becoming KJUD in 1983. For many years, it was Juneau's only commercial station, and is still the only full-power commercial station in the area.

Initially, KJUD carried programming from ABC, NBC, and CBS for many years. During the late 1950s, the station was also briefly affiliated with the NTA Film Network.

In 1995, the station became a part of the Alaska Superstation network, with KIMO (now KYUR) and KATN. In September 2006, KJUD began to show programming from The CW on its digital subchannel. The subchannel was initially known as Juneau CW, but has since been rebranded to Alaska CW. Smith Media sold KJUD and the remainder of the "ABC Alaska's Superstation" system to Vision Alaska LLC in 2010. On September 1, 2011, KJUD began carrying programming from the Fox network on digital subchannel 8.3; the subchannel became the first Fox affiliate in the Juneau market.

In 2022, the station and its sisters outsourced their news programming to News Hub, which had recently been acquired by Coastal Television, as Your Alaska Link News.

== Subchannels ==
The station's signal is multiplexed:

Subchannels of KJUD
| Channel | Res. | Short name | Programming |
|---|---|---|---|
| 8.1 | 720p | KJUD-DT | ABC |
| 8.2 | 480i | KJUD CW | The CW Plus (4:3) |
| 8.3 | 720p | KJUDHD3 | Fox |
| 8.4 | 480i | ION | Ion Television |
| 8.5 | 480i | MYSTERY | Ion Mystery |
| 8.6 | 480i | GRIT | Grit |
