= Alaska Rural Communications Service =

Television network in Alaska, United States

- Statewide Alaska, outside Anchorage, Fairbanks and Juneau; United States
- Channels: Digital: Various, see below; Virtual: Various, see below
- Branding: ARCS

Programming
- Affiliations: .1: ABC (via KYUR); CBS (via KAUU); Fox (via KTBY); Syndicated programming (via KAUU-DT4); NBC (via KTUU); .2: PBS (via KAKM); .3: UAF TV/FNX; .4: KTOO 360TV

Ownership
- Owner: State of Alaska (transmitter owner)
- Operator: Alaska Public Media

History
- Former affiliations: KTVA (CBS, 19??–2020); KUAC (PBS, 19??–2021)

Links
- Website: www.arcstv.org

The Alaska Rural Communications Service (ARCS) is a statewide network of low-powered television stations, serving 235 communities throughout the Alaskan Bush areas. Developed in the late 1970s, the network is based in Anchorage, Alaska, and is operated by Alaska Public Media. Programming is beamed via satellite to the rural transmitters owned by the Alaska state government.

Low powered television broadcasts began in 1959, with a transmitter in the Suntrana-Healy area. In 1972, the Alaskan Public Broadcasting Commission (APBC) received FCC permission to test the use of videotapes to bring television to areas of Alaska with no ability to access terrestrial repeaters; tests began in three villages the next year. Alaska's state legislature then provided funding to the state's Office of Telecommunications to lease a satellite transponder and modify existing telephone earth stations for television in 1976. The first satellite-fed television transmissions began on January 15, 1977, in Tenakee Springs. A Telecommunications Committee under the Alaska Federation of Natives selected programming for the new service, the committee became known as the Rural Alaska Television Network (RATNET). In 1995, after state funding cuts, Bethel Broadcasting, Incorporated, operators of KYUK, assumed responsibility for the service, at the time called The Alaska Satellite Television Project (ASTP). Control of ARCS passed from Alaska Public Broadcasting, Inc. to Alaska Public Media, which also operates Anchorage's PBS member station KAKM, in 2021.

Programming on ARCS is a selection of shows from the four largest commercial broadcast networks (NBC, CBS, ABC, Fox) and syndication, via the Anchorage stations; plus PBS programming from KAKM and other PBS members in the state; occasionally, ARCS produces some of its own programming (including local sports coverage). Anchorage stations provide their programming to ARCS free of charge with the condition that advertising is allowed to remain.

There is currently no CW programming available on ARCS (nor did it air programming from The WB), and though in the past the network carried MyNetworkTV programming from KYES-TV (and previously, UPN), it has not since its 2009 conversion from a network to an all-repeat programming service; it did carry other syndicated programming from that station, mainly on weekends, until KYES-TV took over the CBS affiliation from KTVA on August 1, 2020 (KYES-TV's former programming shifted to its fourth subchannel and will continue to air on ARCS on weekends). In late February 2021, KYES's call letters were changed to KAUU, to complement sister station KTUU.

Even though much of ARCS' programming contains commercials, the operation of ARCS is partially funded by donations from its viewers, just like member stations of PBS, as well as those of the Christian-based Trinity Broadcasting Network.

Many of ARCS' stations which were in analog were converted to digital broadcasting as part of the FCC mandated digital television transition which was originally scheduled for July 13, 2021 for low-power TV stations as well as translator stations in Alaska. The network flash cut its transmitters once the transition is completed, shutting down its analog transmissions and switching on their digital transmitters at the same time. This has also allowed ARCS to add new subchannels, including KTOO 360TV, First Nations Experience, and UAF TV via Alaska Public Media's KAKM-TV.

In June 2021, the FCC granted a waiver for the service to continue analog television service on 15 of its transmitters until January 10, 2022, so that they could continue to complete the upgrade of its low-powered stations to digital. The FCC cited Alaska's climate and short construction season, the remoteness of the transmitter sites in question, and the fact that all the transmitters represented the sole over-the-air television service in each of the communities involved. Another application to extend the construction permits on several other ARCS transmitters was submitted on January 10, 2022; as of February 2022, the application is under review. In a subsequent filing to the FCC in July 2022, the State of Alaska and Alaska Public Media indicated that they planned to let construction permits for 37 of the repeaters lapse.

== List of stations ==
As of June 2021, the ARCS had 169 station licenses, of which 106 were operational. The ARCS is seen on the following low-powered television stations:

- K08KD-D Alakanuk
- K08HU-D Aleknagik
- K11QI-D Ambler
- K07SS-D Angoon
- K17OX-D Bear Creek
- K13TE-D Bettles
- K13SY-D Birch Creek
- K09QG-D Chalkyitsik
- K09PO-D Chevak
- K07RY-D Chignik
- K09TT-D Circle
- K13UO-D Cold Bay
- K08KO-D Cooper Landing
- K07RU-D Dot Lake
- K09RF-D Eagle Village
- K09TK-D Elfin Cove
- K03GA-D Elim
- K09RP-D False Pass
- K04LZ-D Galena
- K10LJ-D Galena
- K09QR-D Gambell
- K07QX-D Golovin
- K09SG-D Goodnews Bay
- K09PC-D Grayling
- K04MR-D Gustavus
- K07RJ-D Holy Cross
- K07QD-D Hooper Bay
- K04MM-D Hyder
- K09SP-D Igiugig
- K09QP-D Kake
- K09TR-D Kalskag
- K09TX-D Kaltag
- K09QK-D Karluk
- K09QW-D King Cove
- K03GL-D King Mountain, etc.
- K07OL-D Kipnuk
- K15AT-D Kodiak
- K09SL-D Kotlik
- K09OV-D Kotzebue
- K09SA-D Koyuk
- K11QY-D Kwethluk
- K07TH-D Lime Village
- K13TN-D Manley Hot Springs
- K07TK-D Marshall
- K09QC-D McGrath
- K09NI-D Mekoryuk
- K15AP-D Moose Pass
- K13TJ-D Mountain Village
- K13UV-D Napakiak
- K09QM-D Nelson Lagoon
- K04MT-D Newtok
- K10LU-D Nightmute
- K09OW-D Nome
- K02LJ-D Nondalton
- K04KP-D Northway
- K04JF-D Nulato
- K13RN-D Old Harbor
- K13SV-D Pedro Bay
- K04LB-D Pelican
- K09NK-D Perryville
- K15AF-D Petersburg
- K09NO-D Pilot Point
- K15AU-D Pilot Station
- K13SA-D Port Heiden
- K09SR-D Port Lions
- K09RA-D Sand Point
- K07RD-D Savoonga
- K07PG-D Seward
- K10KH-D Shageluk
- K09NH-D Shungnak
- K13SM-D Slana
- K12MD-D Sleetmute
- K09RE-D St. George
- K07RK-D St. Mary's
- K09QX-D St. Michael
- K09RB-D St. Paul
- K13SE-D Stony River
- K07RB-D Tanana
- K10KG-D Tenakee Springs
- K09QU-D Togiak
- K13RR-D Tok
- K11QG-D Toksook Bay
- K24AG-D Trapper Creek
- K09RC-D Unalakleet
- K04KV-D Unalaska
- K09OT-D Valdez
- K09TW-D Venetie
- K04MN-D Wales
- K13TD-D White Mountain
- K07ST-D Womens Bay
