= KTVA =

Television station in Anchorage, Alaska

Satellite of KAKM
- Anchorage, Alaska; United States
- Channels: Digital: 28 (UHF); Virtual: 11
- Branding: Alaska Public Media

Programming
- Affiliations: 11.1: PBS; for others, see § Subchannels

Ownership
- Owner: Alaska Public Media

History
- First air date: December 11, 1953
- Former channel numbers: Analog: 11 (VHF, 1953–2009)
- Former affiliations: CBS (1953–2020); DuMont (secondary, 1953–1955); NBC (secondary, 1965–1970); PBS (Sesame Street, 1970–1975); Dark (2020–2021); Rewind TV (2021–2025)
- Call sign meaning: Television Alaska

Technical information
- Licensing authority: FCC
- Facility ID: 49632
- ERP: 28.9 kW
- HAAT: 60.6 m (199 ft)
- Transmitter coordinates: 61°11′31″N 149°54′9″W

Links
- Public license information: Public file; LMS
- Website: www.alaskapublic.org

KTVA (channel 11) is a television station in Anchorage, Alaska, United States. It is a satellite of PBS member station KAKM (channel 7) which is owned by Alaska Public Media. KTVA's transmitter is located in Spenard—covering the Anchorage bowl and much of the adjacent Matanuska-Susitna Valley.

KTVA was a commercial station affiliated with CBS from its sign-on in December 1953. That relationship ended on July 31, 2020, when the CBS affiliation in Anchorage was moved to KYES-TV (channel 5, now KAUU) as that station's parent company, Gray Television, acquired KTVA's non-license assets.

KTVA signed off on September 3, 2020. It resumed broadcasting on September 2, 2021, to retain its license.

In the past, KTVA was a partner of the service of low-power translators through the Alaska Rural Communications Service (ARCS).

== History ==
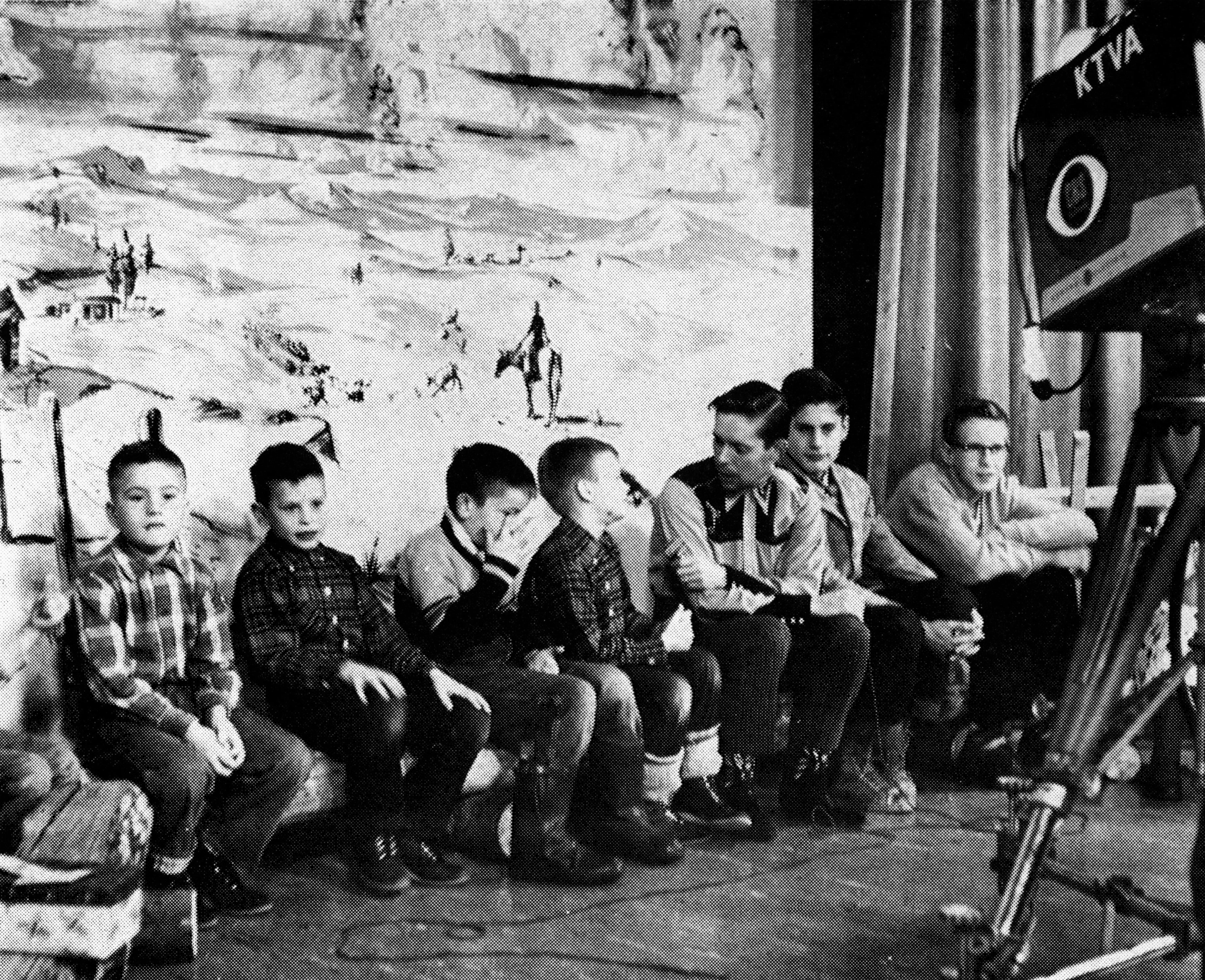
Early KTVA broadcast, a children's program sponsored by the regional department store chain Monty's. Host Paul West interviews members of the Buckeroo Mushers, a youth mushing group sponsored by the Alaskan Sled Dog and Racing Association.

Alaskan broadcast pioneer August G. "Augie" Hiebert (1916–2007) applied for the license in May 1953 through his company, Northern Television. He received FCC approval for construction permits in July 1953, and KTVA signed on the air on December 11, 1953 (broadcasting initially from 6 to 11:30 p.m.). The studio and office were originally housed on the first floor and the transmitter on top of the pink 14-story McKinley Tower, with an analog signal on VHF channel 11. The station aired a few NBC programs in the late 1960s, until KHAR-TV (channel 13, now ABC affiliate KYUR) took the NBC affiliation in 1970. The station was a DuMont affiliate in the early 1950s. KTVA also carried Sesame Street from 1970 until PBS member station KAKM (channel 7) signed on in 1975.

On January 3, 1971, KTVA aired Anchorage's first-ever live satellite broadcast from the lower 48 states, the 1970 NFC Championship Game. Until the 1980s, when the networks went to full satellite distribution, KTVA and other TV stations in Alaska aired network programming on a tape-delayed basis via kinescoped and, later, videotaped recordings of network programs provided by fellow CBS affiliate KIRO-TV in Seattle (and KING-TV during KTVA's NBC affiliation), which were then flown to Alaska.

Hiebert retired in 1997, and three years later in 2000, KTVA was acquired by the newspaper publisher MediaNews Group. KTVA brought in $6.8 million of revenue in 2009, second to NBC affiliate KTUU-TV (channel 2) with $10 million (40% of the market).

On November 9, 2012, GCI, through subsidiary Denali Media Holdings, announced plans to purchase KTVA, as well as KATH-LD and KSCT-LP in Southeast Alaska. The Federal Communications Commission approved the deal on October 29, 2013. The sale was formally closed on November 1.

On December 2, 2013, KTVA moved to a new high definition-capable studio on the second floor of the headquarters of the Anchorage Daily News, and unveiled a new set and logo. KTVA became the first television station in Alaska to broadcast local news in high definition.

In 2017, KTVA was received a prestigious James Beard Award for its Harvesting Alaska series, beating out CBS This Morning and WLS-TV in Chicago. KTVA has also received many accolades, including an Emmy, RTNDA awards, NPPA awards, Alaska Press Club awards and Alaska 'Goldie' Awards.

Channel 11's studios were severely damaged following major earthquakes that hit Anchorage on the morning of November 30, 2018, which also temporarily knocked the station off the air. Part of the structure, equipment and water were strewn about the facility, which one reporter for the station called "absolutely destroyed".

In 2020, GCI/Denali Media Holdings announced their intention to sell its broadcast holdings. Atlanta-based Gray Television, which already owned KTUU-TV and KYES-TV (channel 5) in Anchorage, and NBC affiliate KTVF in Fairbanks, purchased KATH-LD and KSCT-LP in May. On July 31, Gray and GCI/Denali announced that the former company had acquired KTVA's non-license assets, including its news department and CBS affiliation, and would move that programming to KYES-TV; the on-air transfer took place that same day. As Gray already owned two full-power stations in Anchorage, it could not directly purchase nor operate KTVA; a GCI spokesperson said that it had not determined its plans for the KTVA license and facilities. However, KYES-TV was simulcast on KTVA for a period for the benefit of viewers. On August 13, KYES-TV's CBS service permanently moved to GCI channel 5, while KYES-DT4, which also launched on August 1 and carries the former primary schedule and MyNetworkTV affiliation of KYES-TV, moved to GCI channel 11.

After the final newscast for the KTVA news operation aired on August 30, 2020, the station notified the FCC it would go dark as of September 3, as it searched for a buyer. It stated that the expected time off the air was six months, although it had to resume broadcasting by September 3, 2021, to avoid automatic cancellation of its license. Its website was then directed to a new combined KTUU/KYES website, with that news operation now known as Alaska's News Source. At the end of February 2021, KYES-TV's calls were changed to KAUU to coordinate with KTUU.

On September 2, 2021, KTVA resumed broadcasting as an affiliate of Rewind TV. In October 2024, GCI filed to sell the station to Alaska Public Media, operator of Anchorage PBS station KAKM. The sale was completed on February 18, 2025. Alaska Public Media runs KTVA as a straight repeater of KAKM. Management cited GCI's plans to shut down its cable television systems in 2025, potentially increasing dependence on broadcast TV in the area. KTVA's centrally located tower provides better coverage of Anchorage than the more distant and partially terrain shielded Knik TV Mast; Alaska Public Media estimated 86,000 households in Anchorage would see an improved signal.

== News operation ==
KTVA broadcast 22 hours of locally produced newscasts each week (with four hours each weekday and one hour each on Saturdays and Sundays). Weekday news offerings included a one-hour morning newscast called Daybreak at 6 a.m. with an additional hour at 9 a.m. (which premiered on September 12, 2016), two half-hour evening newscasts at 5 p.m. and 10 p.m. and a one-hour newscast at 6 p.m. The station dropped its morning and weekend newscasts on April 18, 2012, but they were reinstated in December 2013. News programming was simulcast on KYES in August, subsequent to the sale of non-license assets to Gray, until the last newscasts aired on August 30, 2020.

KTVA's newscast focused more on enterprise and investigative reporting, and less on crime, in contrast to its main competitor, KTUU. However, ratings remained weak and in 2018, the newscasts changed to a traditional format, with continued poor ratings until the newscast's termination.

On September 21, 2014, during the outro of a story regarding the state's November Measure 2 ballot issue, which would allow recreational use of marijuana, reporter Charlene Egbe, who used the on-air pseudonym Charlo Greene, revealed that she was the president of the medical cannabis organization Alaska Cannabis Club, which campaigned for the legalization of the drug in Alaska. She ended the outro with a profane statement, resigned on-air and walked off the set. Egbe later admitted that she did this in order to "draw attention" to the issue of legalization of marijuana. Following the incident, Bert Rudman, the station's news director, issued a formal apology. As the incident occurred after 10 p.m. local time past the FCC's safe harbor provisions, FCC action was not pursued, and a fine was not assessed. Measure 2 won voter support and was passed in the November 4 election.

== Technical information ==
=== Subchannels ===
This station rebroadcasts the subchannels of KAKM:

Subchannels of KAKM and KTVA
Channel		Res.	Short name	Programming
KAKM	KTVA	Res.	Short name	Programming
7.1	11.1	1080i	KAKM-HD	PBS
7.2	11.2	480i	Create	Create
7.3	11.3	480i	KTOO360	KTOO 360TV
7.4	11.4	1080i	24_7HD	PBS Kids

=== Analog-to-digital conversion ===
KTVA shut down its analog signal, over VHF channel 11, on June 12, 2009, the official date on which full-power television stations in the United States transitioned from analog to digital broadcasts under federal mandate. The station's digital signal remained on its pre-transition UHF channel 28, using virtual channel 11.

=== Former translators ===
KTVA ran translator stations K16DO and K11RK. K16DO broadcast from along a road in Eagle River, similar to other former translator K61CB. K11RK broadcast to Homer, but had their transmitter closer to Seldovia, on the other side from Homer. K11RK shut down in 2011 and K16DO shut down in 2010.
