= Mount Wilson (California) =

Mountain in California, United States

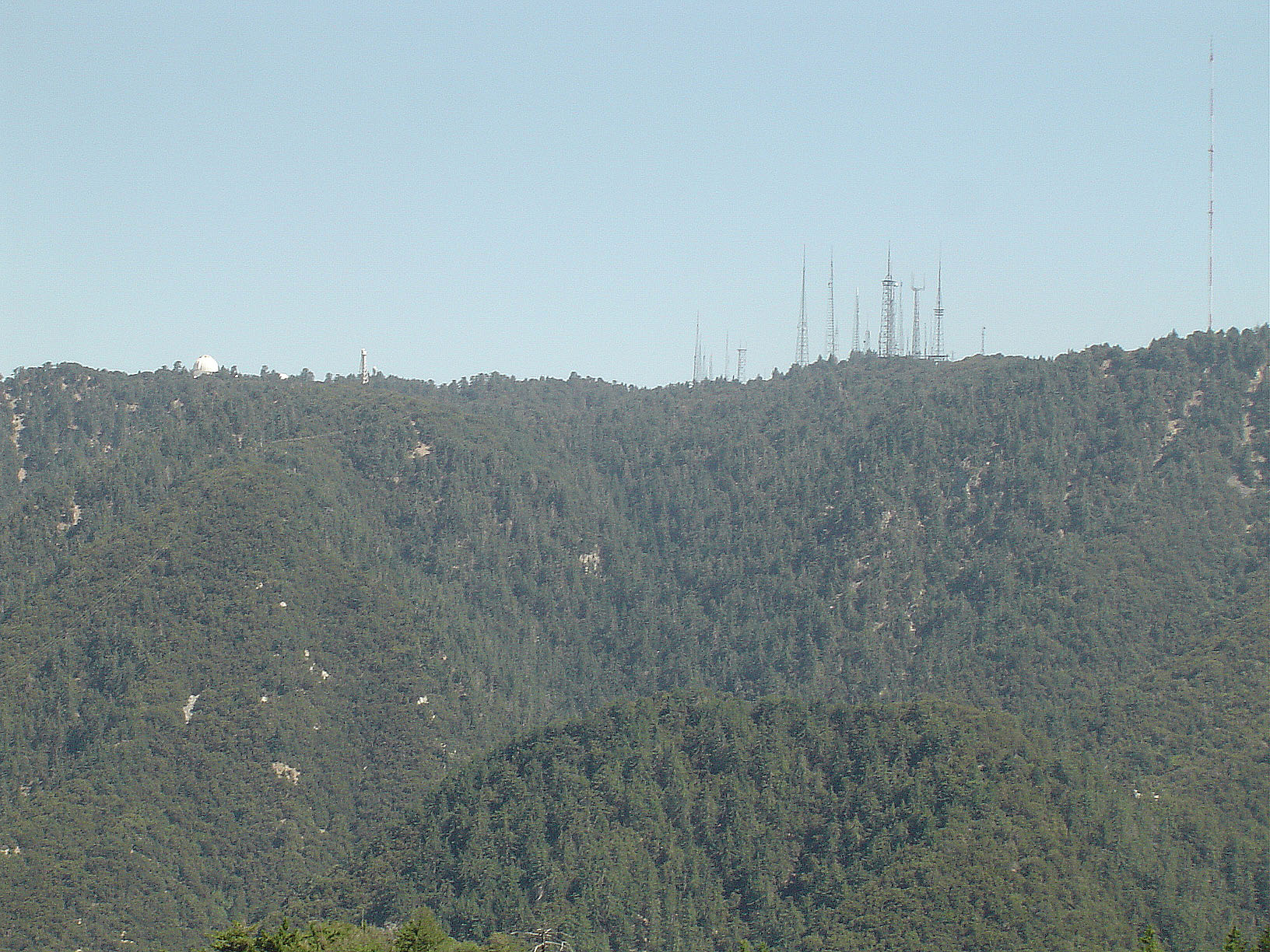
- The northern slope of Mount Wilson, atop which sits an antenna farm near its summit, as seen from Angeles Crest Highway

Highest point
- Elevation: 5,713 ft (1,741 m) NAVD 88
- Prominence: 150 ft (50 m)
- Coordinates: 34°13′26″N 118°03′42″W

Geography
- Location within the Los Angeles metropolitan area
- Location: Los Angeles County, California, U.S.
- Parent range: San Gabriel Mountains
- Topo map: USGS Mount Wilson

Climbing
- Easiest route: Drive

Mount Wilson is at the peak of the San Gabriel Mountains, located within the San Gabriel Mountains National Monument and Angeles National Forest in Los Angeles County, California. With only minor topographical prominence, the peak is not naturally noticeable from a distance, although it is easily identifiable due to the large number of antennas near its summit. It is a subsidiary peak of nearby San Gabriel Peak. Quartz diorite is the dominant bedrock.

It is the location of the Mount Wilson Observatory, which is an important astronomical facility in Southern California with historic 60-inch (1,524 mm) and 100-inch (2,540 mm) aperture telescopes, and 60-foot (18.3 m) and 150-foot (45.7 m) tall solar towers. The newer CHARA array, run by Georgia State University, is also sited there and does important interferometric stellar research.

The summit is at 5,710 feet (1,740 m). While not the tallest peak in its vicinity, it is high enough in elevation that snow can sometimes interrupt astronomical activities. All of the mountains south of the summit are far shorter leading to unobstructed views across the Los Angeles Basin, Orange County, the Inland Empire, and out to Ventura County, San Diego County and the Pacific Ocean. On most days, Santa Catalina Island, some 65 mi (105 km) south, is visible. On clear days, other Channel Islands visible include San Clemente Island at 95 mi (153 km), Santa Barbara Island at 76 mi (122 km), San Nicolas Island at 107 mi (172 km), Santa Cruz Island at 98 mi (158 km) and San Miguel Island at 133 mi (214 km). At an elevation of 5,710 ft (1,740 m), the horizon on the ocean extends 92 mi (148 km).

Mount Wilson is also heavily utilized for relay broadcasting of radio and television for the Greater Los Angeles Area.

== History ==
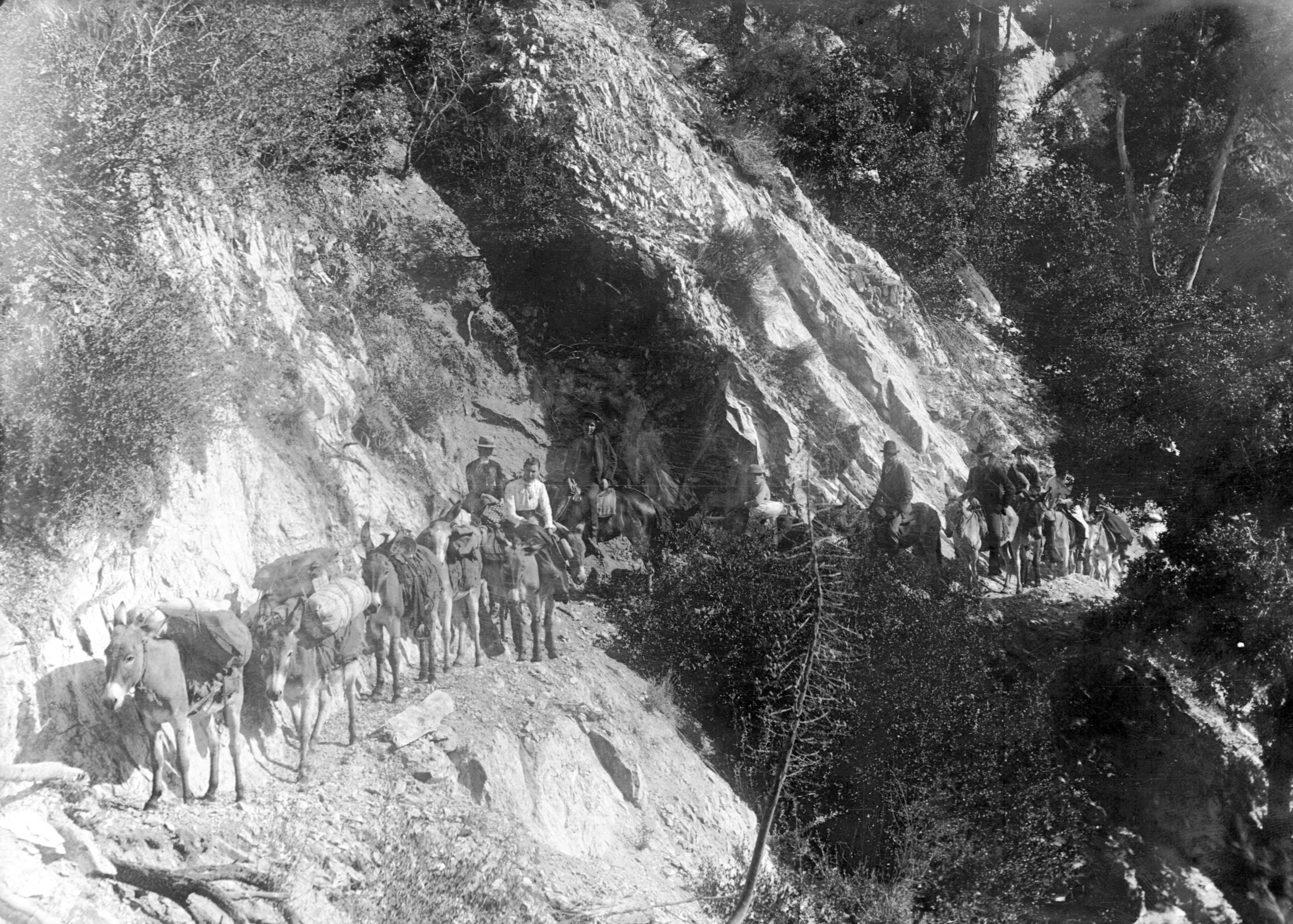
Pack train to Wilson Peak, Sierra Madre Trail, c. 1900. Photo by George Wharton James.

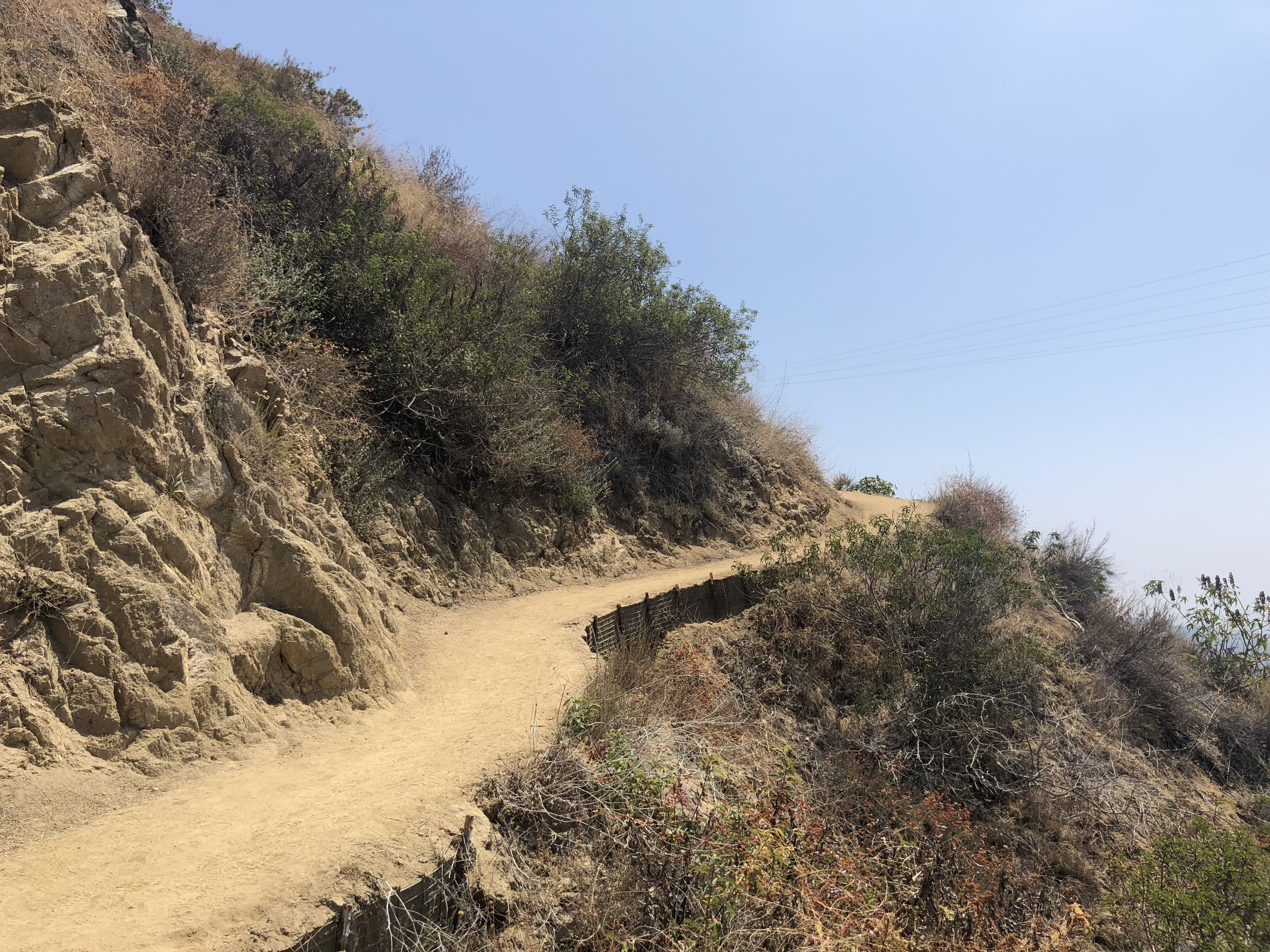
The Mount Wilson Trail is still open to hikers.

The native inhabitants of the San Gabriels probably belonged to various tribes of the Tongva people who lived in the low-lying valleys. Granite outcroppings along the Angeles Crest show signs of meal preparations with metate pots ground into rock surfaces.

The first recorded exploration of the mountain was performed by Benjamin Davis Wilson, also known as "Don Benito". Wilson, who was the grandfather of George S. Patton, owned Rancho San Pascual in about 1852 and ran a winery at his home, "Lake Vineyard", in the area of modern San Marino. Wilson hoped to find a suitable wood for his casks but was disappointed by the poor quality of trees on the mountain. He built a trail, following an established Indian route, which became known as the Mount Wilson Trail. In turn, Wilson's trail became the predecessor of the Mount Wilson Toll Road. He was surprised to find line shacks at the summit, probably left by Spaniards who were known to hunt grizzly bears. He built a three-room cabin along the trail called "Halfway House." Despite Wilson's inability to find adequate wood, the hike became a popular pastime for locals who would make a weekend trip to the summit. These hikers built signal fires on the summit to let people below know that the party had arrived safely.

In January 2025, the Eaton Fire burned large swaths of Eaton Canyon on the southern aspect of Mount Wilson. Large portions of native canyon live oak and Pseudotsuga macrocarpa were killed in the process and it is uncertain whether these populations will return.

== Climate ==
Climate data for Mount Wilson, California, 1991-2020 normals
Month	Jan	Feb	Mar	Apr	May	Jun	Jul	Aug	Sep	Oct	Nov	Dec	Year
Record high °F (°C)	77 (25)	80 (27)	83 (28)	86 (30)	92 (33)	101 (38)	102 (39)	101 (38)	98 (37)	94 (34)	84 (29)	78 (26)	102 (39)
Mean daily maximum °F (°C)	53.4 (11.9)	53.8 (12.1)	55.6 (13.1)	61.1 (16.2)	68.6 (20.3)	77.5 (25.3)	83.5 (28.6)	84.1 (28.9)	79.9 (26.6)	70.6 (21.4)	61.9 (16.6)	54.6 (12.6)	67.1 (19.5)
Daily mean °F (°C)	44.8 (7.1)	44.2 (6.8)	46.8 (8.2)	51.3 (10.7)	58.2 (14.6)	66.7 (19.3)	73.0 (22.8)	73.5 (23.1)	68.0 (20.0)	60.3 (15.7)	51.9 (11.1)	45.0 (7.2)	57.0 (13.9)
Mean daily minimum °F (°C)	36.1 (2.3)	36.6 (2.6)	37.8 (3.2)	41.7 (5.4)	48.2 (9.0)	57.5 (14.2)	64.2 (17.9)	63.9 (17.7)	59.0 (15.0)	51.3 (10.7)	43.4 (6.3)	37.4 (3.0)	48.4 (9.1)
Record low °F (°C)	9 (−13)	11 (−12)	14 (−10)	18 (−8)	22 (−6)	29 (−2)	38 (3)	37 (3)	34 (1)	18 (−8)	15 (−9)	10 (−12)	9 (−13)
Average precipitation inches (mm)	7.73 (196)	8.26 (210)	5.63 (143)	2.05 (52)	1.05 (27)	0.21 (5.3)	0.21 (5.3)	0.01 (0.25)	0.32 (8.1)	1.31 (33)	3.48 (88)	4.46 (113)	34.72 (880.95)
Average snowfall inches (cm)	3.6 (9.1)	2.4 (6.1)	3.0 (7.6)	1.4 (3.6)	0.1 (0.25)	0.0 (0.0)	0.0 (0.0)	0.0 (0.0)	0.0 (0.0)	0.0 (0.0)	0.6 (1.5)	1.7 (4.3)	12.8 (32.45)
Average precipitation days (≥ 0.01 in)	6.7	8.6	6.8	4.4	2.5	1.0	1.0	0.4	1.0	2.9	4.2	6.8	46.3
Source: NOAA

== Astronomy ==
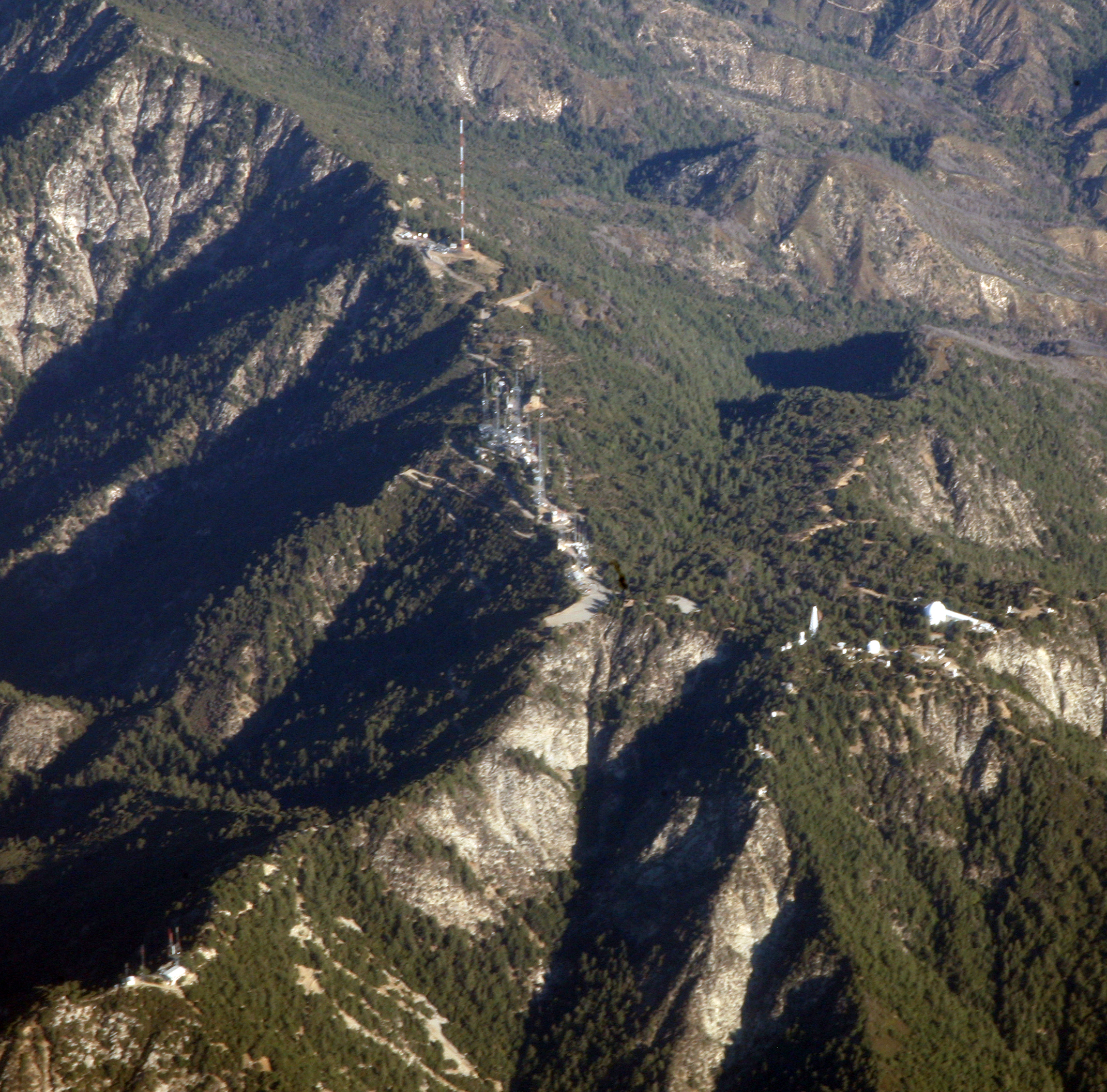
Mount Wilson aerial photo, showing Radio Ridge antenna farm and the Observatory. Photo by Doc Searls.

In 1889, Professor William Pickering of Harvard University, along with telescope-maker Alvan Clark, prepared an experiment with 4-and-13-inch (102 and 330 mm) telescopes at Mount Wilson. University students would operate the telescopes for nighttime viewing, but more often than not they would log in "bad weather, no visibility" and head to town to relieve their boredom. The small observatory was abandoned with plans to build a larger one at a later date.

In 1891, Thaddeus S. C. Lowe incorporated the Pasadena & Mount Wilson Railroad with the plan of building a scenic mountain railroad to the summit of Mt. Wilson. At the same time, land and easement disputes between camp owners Steils and Strain were going on over the public and private use of the Mount Wilson Trail. The courts ruled that the trail was a public thoroughfare and that any blockading would be illegal. At the foot of the mountain, a local contractor Thomas Banbury built a 10 mi (16 km) roadway to be named "The New Mount Wilson Trail," now the Mount Wilson Toll Road. Passage fare was 25¢ round trip for hikers (equivalent to $9 in 2025) and 50¢ for horseback.

In 1892, Charles William Eliot, president of Harvard University, planned to have two 40 in (1,000 mm) lenses shipped from Alvan Clark & Sons in Corning, New York to the newly named Mount Harvard, directly adjacent to Mt. Wilson. The money was to be put up by Edward Falles Spence of the University of Southern California. Walter Raymond, of Raymond & Whitcomb Travel Agency, Boston, and owner of the Raymond Hotel, Pasadena, offered to pay for rail from New York. Lowe offered to take the lenses up via his yet-to-be-built Mt. Wilson Railway. Spence died suddenly and left no word of the money for the project. The lenses ended up at Yerkes Observatory in Wisconsin, and Lowe's railway ended up going to Oak Mountain (Mount Lowe).

By 1901, The Mount Wilson Toll Road Co. had purchased Henninger Flats, Strain's Camp, Martin's Camp, and 640 acres (2.6 km^{2}) of the summit.

In 1903, George Ellery Hale visited Mt. Wilson and was impressed by the perfect conditions for which to set up the observatory, which would become the Mount Wilson Solar Observatory in 1904. In 1905, 40 acres (160,000 m^{2}) were leased for 99 years by the Carnegie Institution for Science in order to construct telescopes, and construction began on a new Mt. Wilson Hotel. In 1908, a 60 in (1,500 mm) telescope was completed at the summit, and, in 1910, the 150-foot (46 m) Solar Tower was erected. In 1913, the hotel burned down and was replaced by a second hotel that lasted until its demolition in 1966. The Toll Road opened to automobiles in 1912 and lasted until 1936.

In 1917, the 100 in (2,500 mm) Hooker Telescope was completed and saw first light and would be the world's largest telescope until the opening of the 200 in (5,100 mm) Hale Telescope at Palomar Observatory in 1948.

In 1919, American astronomer Edwin Hubble arrived at Mt. Wilson and, throughout the 1920s, made many astronomical discoveries using the Hooker Telescope. Among his contributions are the observational proof that many nebulous objects are actually galaxies beyond our own Milky Way galaxy, the classification of galaxies according to the Hubble sequence, and the development of Hubble's law relating a galaxy's observed red shift to its distance away. These contributions led to an understanding that the universe is not static, but expanding. This concept is the basis of the Big Bang theory of cosmology.

In 1926, Albert Abraham Michelson made what was then the most precise calculation of the speed of light at the time by measuring the round-trip travel time of light between Mount Wilson and Mount San Antonio 22 mi (35 km) away.

== Transmission ==
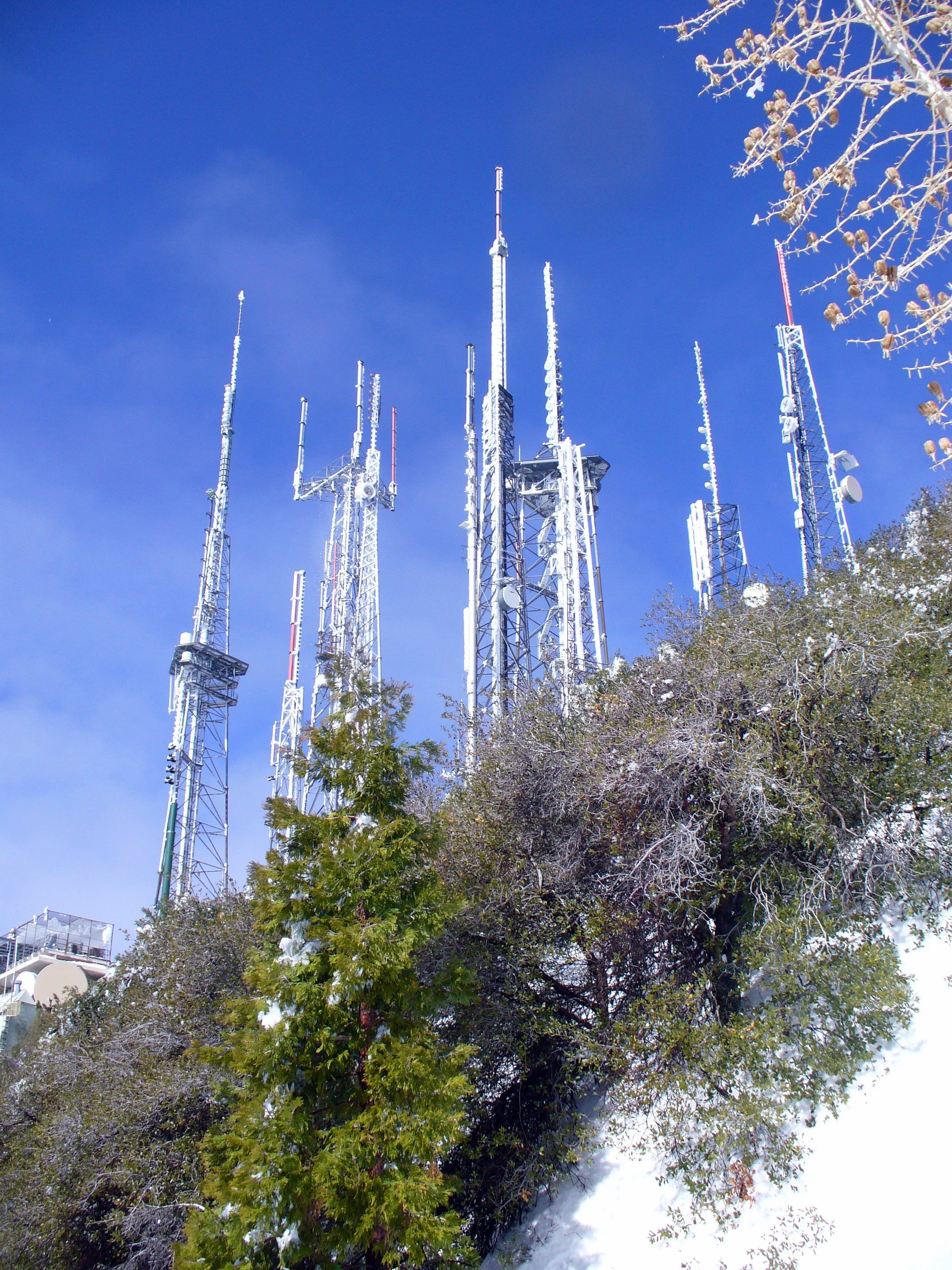
Antennas on Mount Wilson, covered in ice after heavy snowfall

The first television antenna on Mount Wilson was erected in 1947 for pioneer station KTLA channel 5. At about the same time, the first FM station broadcast from Mount Wilson, which was the old KFI-FM on 105.9 FM (signed off in 1950). The mountain became so popular as a site for transmitters that, in 1963, the Metromedia company bought 720 acres (2.9 km^{2}) from the Mount Wilson Hotel Company. Metromedia built Skyline Park, which consisted of a pavilion, a children's zoo and landscaped walks. The park closed in 1976 after operating at a loss for almost a decade. The property is now the home of numerous transmitters serving the Los Angeles metropolitan area and includes radio, television and microwave relay facilities. The tallest of these, according to the FCC database, is the guyed mast built for KCBS-TV in 1986, now owned by Richland Towers, which stands at a height of 972 ft (296 m).

=== Television ===
The following television stations transmit from Mount Wilson. Several stations share their physical channel with another station, thus some channels repeat in the following table.

Callsign	Virtual Channel	Transmit Channel	Affiliation
KCBS	2	31	CBS
KNET-CD	3	32	Daystar
KNBC	4	36	NBC
KTLA	5	35	The CW
KABC	7	7	ABC
KFLA-LD	8	8	ShopHQ
KCAL	9	9	Ind.
KIIO-LD	10	10	Armenian Ind.
KTTV	11	11	Fox
KCOP-TV	13	13	MyNetworkTV
KSCI	18	18	Shop LC
KNLA-CD	20	32	Daystar Español
KSCN-TV	22	4	Scientology Network
KWHY	63	4	Multicultural Ind. (EMT Media)
KCET	28	28	PBS
KPXN	30	24	ION
KVMD	31	23	Canal de la Fe
KMEX	34	34	Univisión
KTAV-LD	35	21	Almavisión
KHIZ-LD	39	2	Defy
KTBN-TV	40	33	TBN
KXLA	44	30	LATV
KSKJ-CD	45	26	Infomercials
KFTR	46	29	UniMas
KOCE	50	18	PBS
KVEA	52	25	Telemundo
KDOC	56	12	TCT
KJLA	57	30	Visión Latina
KLCS	58	28	PBS
KRCA	62	7	Estrella TV
KILM	64	24	Bounce TV

Most stations in the Los Angeles Designated Market Area not listed above transmit from Mount Harvard, an adjacent peak. These stations are (listed by virtual channel followed by physical channel): KHTV-CD channel 6/22 (MeTV+), KZNO-LD channel 12/6 (Jewelry TV), KPOM-CD channel 14/27 (Catchy Comedy), KMRZ-LD channel 16/26 (Jewelry TV), KSFV-CD channel 27/27 (MeTV Toons), KRVD-LD channel 33/10 (Vietnamese Ind.), KAZA-TV channel 54/22 (MeTV).

KVME-TV channel 20/20 (Jewelry TV) transmits from the White Mountains near Bishop.

=== Radio ===
The FM broadcasters are KPCC-FM 89.3, KPFK-FM 90.7, KUSC-FM 91.5, KRRL-FM 92.3, KCBS-FM 93.1, KLLI-FM 93.9, KTWV 94.7, KLOS-FM 95.5, KNX-FM 97.1, KKLA-FM 99.5, KKLQ-FM 100.3, KRTH-FM 101.1, KSCA-FM 101.9, KIIS-FM 102.7, KOST-FM 103.5, KBIG-FM 104.3, KKGO-FM 105.1, KPWR-FM 105.9, and KLVE-FM 107.5.

== Observatory salvage ==
In 1984, the Carnegie Institution for Science began the process of shutting down the observatories on Mount Wilson, opting to concentrate on newer sites in Chile. In 1986, the Mt. Wilson Institute was formed and plans to reopen the observatories were made so that by 2000 all the telescopes were back in operation.

Construction began in 1996 for six 1-meter telescopes by the Center for High Angular Resolution Astronomy at Georgia State University. This was the largest optical interferometric array at the time. Ground was broken for the telescopes in 1999 and the facility became operational in 2001.

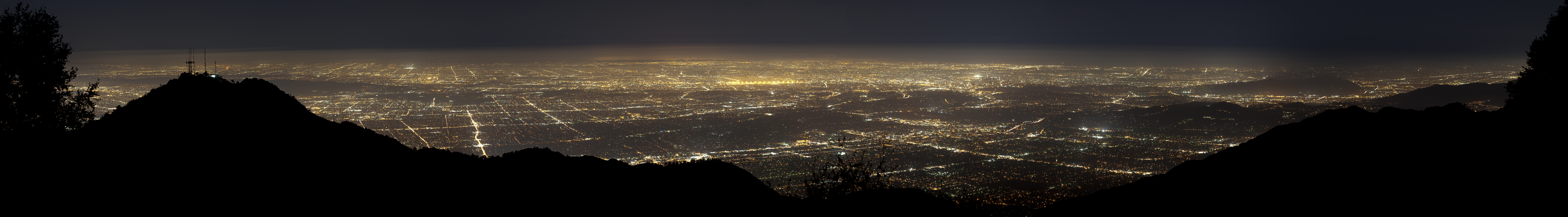
A view of Los Angeles from Mount Wilson

== See also ==
- San Gabriel Mountains National Monument−related topics
- Palomar Observatory
- Sierra Madre, California—at the base of Mt. Wilson, with a trailhead to the peak.

== External links and sources ==
- List of Mount Wilson broadcasters
- Photos from Mount Wilson
- Webcam at Mount Wilson Observatory
- Hikers
- Howser, Huell (November 8, 2010). "Mt. Wilson – California's Gold (147)". California's Gold. Chapman University Huell Howser Archive. Archived from the original on June 30, 2013.
- CHARA array
- Image of a slope on Mount Wilson, California, 1920-1939. Los Angeles Times Photographic Archive (Collection 1429). UCLA Library Special Collections, Charles E. Young Research Library, University of California, Los Angeles.
