= List of Los Angeles television stations =

Los Angeles is currently defined by Nielsen Media Research as the second-largest television market in the United States, with all of the major U.S. television networks having affiliates serving the region. All of the major U.S. television networks are directly owned by the networks.

As of 2026, television stations that primarily serve Greater Los Angeles include:

Station name	Display channel	Physical channel	Location	Major channel (x.1)	Status
KCBS-TV	2	31	Los Angeles	CBS	Network-owned
KNBC	4	36	Los Angeles	NBC	Network-owned
KTLA	5	35	Los Angeles	The CW	Network-owned
KHTV-CD	6	22	Los Angeles	MeTV+	Network-owned
KABC-TV	7	7	Los Angeles	ABC	Network-owned
KFLA-LD	8	8	Los Angeles	Binge TV	
KCAL-TV	9	9	Los Angeles	(station)	Network-owned (Note: Owned and operated by CBS)
KIIO-LD	10	10	Los Angeles	(Armenian station)	Independent
KTTV	11	11	Los Angeles	Fox	Network-owned
KZNO-LD (Note: KZNO-LD additionally transmits with an experimental analog FM radio subcarrier that is accessible at 87.7 MHz.)	12	6	Los Angeles	Jewelry TV	
KCOP-TV	13	13	Los Angeles	MyNetworkTV	Network-owned
KPOM-CD	14	27	Ontario	Catchy Comedy	Network-owned
KMRZ-LD	16		Pomona	Jewelry TV	
KSCI	18	18	Long Beach	Shop LC	
KNLA-CD	20	32	Los Angeles	Daystar Español	Network-owned
KVME-TV	20	20	Bishop	Jewelry TV	
KSCN-TV	22	4	Los Angeles	Scientology Network	Network-owned
KVCR-DT	24	5	San Bernardino	PBS	
KNET-CD	25	32	Los Angeles	Daystar	Network-owned
KSFV-CD	27	27	Los Angeles	MeTV Toons	Network-owned
KCET	28	28	Los Angeles	PBS	Major member
KPXN-TV	30	24	San Bernardino	Ion Television	Network-owned
KVMD	31	23	Twentynine Palms	(station)	Independent
KRVD-LD	33	10	Santa Ana	Jewelry TV	
KMEX-DT	34	34	Los Angeles	Univision	Network-owned
KTAV-LD	35	21	Los Angeles	Almavision	Network-owned
KHIZ-LD	39	2	Los Angeles	Defy	
KTBN-TV	40	33	Santa Ana	TBN	Network-owned
KXLA	44	30	Rancho Palos Verdes	LATV	Network-owned
KSKJ-CD	45	26	Van Nuys	Heartland	
KEDD-LD	45	27	Los Angeles	Jewelry TV	
KFTR-DT	46	29	Ontario	UniMás	Network-owned
KOCE-TV	50	18	Huntington Beach	PBS	Major member
KVEA	52	25	Corona	Telemundo	Network-owned
KAZA-TV	54	22	Los Angeles	MeTV	Network-owned
KDOC-TV	56	12	Anaheim	TCT	Network-owned
KJLA	57	30	Ventura	Visión Latina	
KLCS	58	28	Los Angeles	PBS	Major member
KRCA	62	7	Riverside	Estrella TV	Network-owned
KWHY	63	4	Garden Grove	Canal de la Fe	Multicultural Independent
KILM	64	24	Inglewood	Bounce TV	Network-owned

== Defunct stations ==
- KBLM-LP—Riverside (1999–2016)
- KEEF-TV—Los Angeles (1987)
- KKOG-TV—Ventura (1968–69)
- KPAL-LP—Palmdale (1989–2012)
- KVST-TV—Los Angeles (1974–75)
- KVKV-LP—Victorville
- KVTU-LD—Agoura Hills (2004–10; 2016–20)

== See also ==
- Bally Sports SoCal
- Bally Sports West
- CBS News Los Angeles
- NBC Sports California
- Spectrum News 1
- Spectrum SportsNet
- Spectrum SportsNet LA
