= WCBZ-CD =

Television station in Columbus, Ohio

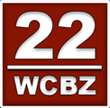
- Columbus, Ohio; United States
- Channels: Digital: 18 (UHF); Virtual: 22
- Branding: WCBZ 22

Programming
- Affiliations: 22.1: Cozi TV; for others, see § Subchannels

Ownership
- Owner: Columbus Broadcasting Corporation

History
- First air date: April 17, 1989
- Former call signs: W22AE (1989–1995); WBKA-LP (1995–2004); WBKA-CA (2004–2009); WMNO-CA (2009–2015); WMNO-CD (2015–2018)
- Former channel numbers: Analog: 22 (UHF, 1989–2015); Digital: 28 (UHF, 2015–2019)

Technical information
- Licensing authority: FCC
- Facility ID: 1104
- Class: CD
- ERP: 15 kW
- HAAT: 96.2 m (316 ft)
- Transmitter coordinates: 40°6′53.8″N 82°58′55.3″W

Links
- Public license information: Public file; LMS
- Website: www.yourtv22.com

WCBZ-CD (channel 22) is a low-power, Class A television station in Columbus, Ohio, United States, affiliated with the digital multicast network Cozi TV. The station is owned by the Columbus Broadcasting Corporation.

== History ==
WCBZ-CD was founded as W22AE in Marion, Ohio, on April 17, 1989. The station then changed its call letters to WBKA-LP in 1995. In 2004, the station was acquired from low-power broadcaster Crawford Broadcasting by Metro Video Productions, and was granted Class A status, thus changing its callsign to WBKA-CA.

In 2008, the station was acquired by Studio 51 Multimedia Productions, Ltd., and began operating as TV 22 Marion, offering comprehensive coverage of the events in the Marion County area, as well as other original programming. In August 2009, the WBKA-CA call sign was changed to WMNO-CA (for "Marion, Ohio").

In 2015, the station was purchased by Positive News Network, Inc., at which point it took on its current network affiliation.

In 2017, the call sign changed again to WCBZ-CD (for "Columbus Broadcasting") to better reflect its new ownership by Columbus Broadcasting Corporation.

In Marion, WCBZ-CD had been carried on Time Warner Cable (now Charter Spectrum) channel 3 (with cable box) or channel 96 (without cable box), but the station was removed from the Marion channel lineup on May 8, 2018.

== Technical information ==
=== Subchannels ===
The station's digital signal is multiplexed:

Subchannels of WCBZ-CD
Subchannel	Res.	Short name	Programming
22.1	480i	COZI	Cozi TV
22.2	480i	CourtTV	Court TV
22.3	480i	WEST	WEST
22.4	480i	Toons	MeTV Toons
22.5	480i	Catchy	Catchy Comedy
22.6	480i	CTV	Independent
22.7	480i	Story	Story Television
22.8	480i	JTV	Jewelry TV

=== Analog-to-digital conversion ===
WCBZ-CD (as WMNO-CD) shut down its analog signal, over UHF channel 22, on January 7, 2015, and "flash-cut" its digital signal into operation to UHF channel 28, using virtual channel 22.
