= KDOC-TV =

Television station in Anaheim, California

- Anaheim–Los Angeles, California; United States
- City: Anaheim, California
- Channels: Digital: 12 (VHF); Virtual: 56

Programming
- Affiliations: 56.1: TCT; for others, see § Subchannels

Ownership
- Owner: Total Christian Television; (Radiant Life Ministries, Inc.)

History
- First air date: October 1, 1982
- Former call signs: KGOF (1975–1982)
- Former channel numbers: Analog: 56 (UHF, 1982–2009); Digital: 32 (UHF, 2004–2019)
- Former affiliations: Independent (1982–2022)
- Call sign meaning: Dynamic Orange County

Technical information
- Licensing authority: FCC
- Facility ID: 24518
- ERP: 110 kW
- HAAT: 1,130 m (3,707 ft)
- Transmitter coordinates: 34°13′55″N 118°4′21″W

Links
- Public license information: Public file; LMS
- Website: www.tct.tv

KDOC-TV (channel 56) is a religious television station licensed to Anaheim, California, United States, serving the Los Angeles area. The station is owned by Total Christian Television (TCT). KDOC-TV's studios are located on East First Street in Santa Ana, and its transmitter is located atop Mount Wilson.

== History ==
=== Comparative hearing and construction ===
The story of channel 56 in Anaheim began with as many as six applications filed before the Federal Communications Commission (FCC) in the late 1960s seeking to build what would have been the first commercial television station in Orange County. What started as a six-way battle had been pared down to three bidders by 1974. Television producer Jack Wrather headlined the Orange County Broadcasting Company; Orange Empire Broadcasting, consisting of more private individuals and known as the "doctor's group" for its shareholdings by doctors and dentists, applied; and so too did Golden Orange Broadcasting. Golden Orange had a consortium studded with Hollywood stars: Pat Boone, Fess Parker, Jimmy Durante, Harry Babbitt, and Vic Mizzy were among the shareholders. The brainchild of the application was Edward J. Kirby, a longtime resident of Santa Ana who felt that Orange County was underserved by broadcasters.

Golden Orange emerged the winner from the commission's comparative hearing process—the FCC examiner finding its programming proposal superior—and was granted a construction permit on October 15, 1975, for a station originally given the call sign KGOF. The transmitter would be located at Sierra Peak in the Cleveland National Forest, just south of the Riverside Freeway. A 1977 start date was promised. However, the lengthy hearing process took its toll on the financial commitments the original stockholders had made. Durante was 75 in 1968 and 83 by 1976, having dropped out. Another owner, former newspaper publisher Walter Burroughs, did not want to invest in a new business at the age of 75. Others lost interest; Parker moved to Santa Barbara, and Anaheim farmer Bernardo Yorba dropped out.

However, a second and more serious problem became clear to Golden Orange after it got the permit. If the station was constructed at Sierra Peak, viewers in Orange County would have to turn their antennas to the south to receive it. This was an issue because every Los Angeles TV station telecast from Mount Wilson, to the north of the urban area, and it was unclear whether the FCC would allow the station to be built at Mount Wilson in case viewers in the city of license, Anaheim, received a poorer picture. KGOF first entered into negotiations to share the tower of KOCE-TV in Puente Hills.

=== Early years ===
It took multiple years and several engineering studies before Sunset Ridge, a site in the San Bernardino Mountains, was identified and approved. A full-time general manager was hired in late 1981, but he was replaced months later by Jack Latham, a former anchorman for KNBC and KESQ-TV in Palm Springs. The station moved into a studio near Disneyland in Anaheim, changed call letters to KDOC-TV ("Dynamic Orange County"), and went on the air October 1, 1982. The lineup consisted of older syndicated shows, college sports, and movies, plus two local programs covering Orange County, a "roving reporter"-type program at noon and an evening magazine show. The station had taken so long to build that Durante had died and was replaced as an investor by his estate.

KDOC-TV made news headlines often in the 1980s, typically for the wrong reasons. The station was sued in late 1983 over charges that its general manager, Michael Volpe, had denied a job to a woman who refused to perform sexual favors for him. That case was settled out of court, but a 1984 lawsuit would expose serious issues at KDOC-TV. In July 1984, Steve Conobre, a former advertising salesman for the station, sued KDOC, Boone, Durante's estate, and conservative commentator Wally George, who aired a program on the station. He alleged that Volpe encouraged sales representatives to make up ratings figures for KDOC and attribute them to a fictitious "Anaheim Research Bureau". Arbitron, one of the main television ratings companies at the time, was also known in the industry as "ARB". (Note: The company had previously been known as the American Research Bureau.) Conobre also alleged that Volpe received kickbacks by assigning large advertising accounts to his girlfriend and receiving some of her commission. Former sales manager John Funk brought a similar case in 1985.

Similar allegations were raised by another salesperson at the station, Linda Ford, in a third suit filed in May 1986. She also claimed that George threatened her with loss of her job if she did not "protect" Volpe. Even after the board of directors opted not to renew Volpe's contract, the Conobre case went to a jury in November 1987. The office politics and romantic pursuits laid bare in the suit contrasted with the on-air image of KDOC-TV as a family-sensitive station that even censored music videos. A jury awarded Conobre $256,000. The other two cases were settled out of court.

The Wally George talk show, Hot Seat, continued to tape until July 2003, completing 20 years on air; George died that October at the age of 71, at which time station CEO Calvin Brack remarked that he was KDOC-TV's most popular personality. During this period, the station was also popular for weekend broadcasts of Asian programming, which gained a significant non-Asian audience with the broadcast of the 1984–1985 (subtitled) Japanese television series Miyamoto Musashi.

Much of the station's programming through the years had been situation comedy and dramatic reruns that were seen on other Los Angeles area stations in years past, after those stations either relinquished or shared the rights with KDOC. Among those shows were The Mary Tyler Moore Show, The Dick Van Dyke Show, The Beverly Hillbillies, The Cosby Show, Saved by the Bell, The Doris Day Show and My Three Sons. Reruns of the iconic courtroom drama Perry Mason had been on the station since 1988, where it aired weekdays at noon for about 20 years, and aired early mornings on KDOC's main channel until September 2011 (several of the aforementioned shows currently air on the station's MeTV subchannel on digital channel 56.3).

=== Ellis ownership ===
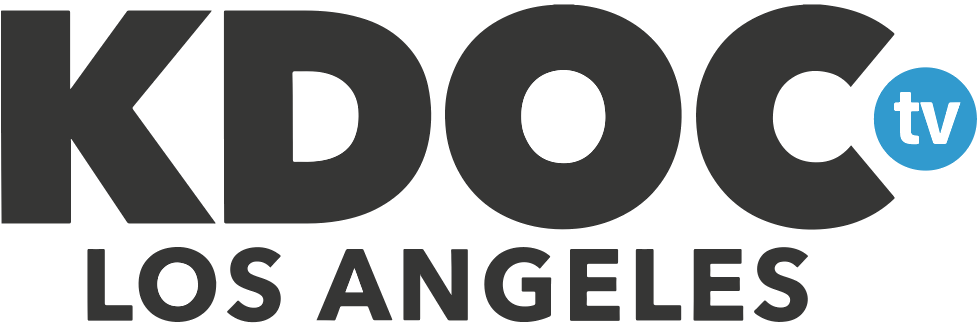
Logo used from 2015 to early 2022. The station's final logo as an independent replaced the "TV" with a "56".

On April 4, 2006, Bert Ellis, along with Anaheim Ducks owners Henry Samueli and his wife Susan, bought KDOC for $149.5 million from Golden Orange Broadcasting. The sale closed in May 2006, placing KDOC under the ownership of Ellis Communications, Inc., a subsidiary of Atlanta-based Titan Broadcast Management, which operated the station under a local marketing agreement. For Ellis, it was a return to the television business, where he had previously built and sold a broadcast holding group.

In September 2006, KDOC made changes to its programming schedule and debuted a new slogan (Endless Classics, a reference to the Beach Boys album and the 1966 film The Endless Summer) and logo. The lineup included more current syndicated repeats, Anaheim Ducks hockey, some movies, as well as hours of paid programming. In 2008, the station's programming began moving away from the "Endless Classics" format adding more recent comedies, and talk and court shows that have ended production.

In September 2008, KDOC launched a new website. It brought a new look, promoting the station's new programming format, and removing the forum section for viewers to post questions and comments on KDOC-TV programming that many stations provide. The Endless Classics logo was replaced in late 2009.

On July 4, 2011, KDOC launched a new, revised website, as well as a new station logo (minus the "-TV" after the KDOC call letters), a new color scheme, programming promotions for KDOC's main channel (56.1) and MeTV subchannel (56.3), videos, and news headlines for both Los Angeles and Orange counties. On December 3, 2012, the station unveiled a new branding campaign, this time rebranding itself as "LA 56".

On May 11, 2015, KDOC dropped the "LA 56" branding after more than two-and-a-half years of use and reverted to identifying by its call letters. This also included the branding on the KABC-TV-produced newscasts, which were rebranded as ABC 7 Eyewitness News on KDOC-TV. In 2022, the station changed its branding to KDOC 56.

=== MeTV affiliation ===
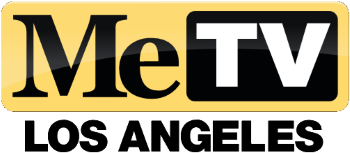
Current "MeTV Los Angeles" logo for channel 56.3

On April 4, 2011, Ellis Communications parent company Titan Broadcast Management announced, along with other television station groups (such as Hearst Television, Capitol Broadcasting Company, Gray Television, Cox Media Group, Nexstar Media Group, and Tegna Inc. among others) to be among the station owners that signed affiliation agreements with MeTV, a network focusing on classic television programming owned by Weigel Broadcasting. The network was launched on KDOC 56.3 on June 13, 2011, as Me-TV Los Angeles. On September 19, 2011, KDOC's main channel adopted a new contemporary programming format, thus positioning MeTV Los Angeles to be the network for classic television programs that once aired on KDOC.

Although KDOC continues to carry MeTV on subchannel 56.3, KVME in Bishop was affiliated with MeTV on April 30, 2012, until January 15, 2018. That station carried MeTV on their primary digital channel 20 (virtual channel 20.1), which made it available on the DirecTV and Dish Network local packages tier for the Los Angeles market. Both stations marketed themselves as "Me-TV Hollywood", changing from KDOC's previous brand of "Me-TV Los Angeles". Local advertising for MeTV Hollywood was sold by a jointly managed ad sales team for both stations. However, KVME's MeTV feed did not carry the full schedule of programming, electing to carry Spanish-language religious and paid programming from 5 a.m. to 8 a.m. on weekdays, preempting regularly scheduled programming in those hours. Unlike the KVME feed, the KDOC version continues to air all MeTV programming intact.

On February 1, 2012, Verizon FiOS began carrying MeTV Hollywood in the Los Angeles area on channel 462. In October 2012, Time Warner Cable (now part of Charter Communications' Spectrum TV service) added MeTV Hollywood on its Southern California systems on channel 1232, carrying a time-shifted national feed instead of either the KVME or KDOC versions.

On January 3, 2018, due to the purchase of Los Angeles station KAZA by Weigel Broadcasting, KAZA became a MeTV owned-and-operated station, in addition to continual coverage via KDOC channel 56.3. Both affiliates are separately owned and operated, broadcasting to specific areas within the Los Angeles region due to signal strength. Before a signal upgrade in late 2018, KAZA's over-the-air signal was not available in much of western and southern Los Angeles County, due to its channel-sharing agreement with low-powered Class A UHF station KHTV-CD, which necessitated the continual co-affiliation through KDOC. In addition, each feed is known by a different station identification; MeTV Los Angeles and MeTV KDOC.

On January 15, 2018, KVME discontinued their MeTV affiliation to become an affiliate of Weigel-owned Heroes and Icons (also available over-the-air in Los Angeles, over KCOP-DT4); on February 1, 2018, Spectrum discontinued its MeTV feed, and began offering KAZA as the sole MeTV channel for its Los Angeles area customers.

=== Sale to TCT ===
In June 2022, Ellis agreed to sell KDOC to Radiant Life Ministries, a sister company of Total Christian Television, for $41 million. The sale was completed on July 28. KDOC flipped to TCT programming at midnight that night, with an episode of Seinfeld being its final program as an independent station.

== Past programming ==
=== General programming ===
Prior to the sale to TCT, syndicated programs that were broadcast on KDOC's main channel included The Steve Wilkos Show, Maury, Forensic Files, The First 48, Lauren Lake's Paternity Court, Couples Court with the Cutlers, Judge Jerry, Pawn Stars, The Goldbergs, Seinfeld, Impractical Jokers, Bob's Burgers and Family Guy.

In addition, the station occasionally aired ABC network programming in the event of programming conflicts on KABC. In June 2019, KDOC broadcast the Formula One Canadian Grand Prix due to special local programming on KABC. In May 2022, KDOC showed a live episode of American Idol that was broadcast coast-to-coast at 5 p.m. PT due to KABC airing a Los Angeles mayoral debate at 5:30 p.m. PT; the episode re-aired on KABC at 8 p.m. PT.

=== Sports programming ===
KDOC-TV offered some live sports programming, such as UNLV Runnin' Rebels men's basketball during the height of the Jerry Tarkanian era (with play-by-play for many years called by Chick Hearn), plus Loyola Marymount University men's basketball, and a syndicated package of Western Athletic Conference men's basketball games. In 2004, KDOC (with KPXN-TV) carried selected Anaheim Angels games, as then-new owner Arte Moreno wanted to broadcast more games beyond the slate of telecasts already contractually obligated to air on Fox Sports West and the team's then-primary over-the-air carrier KCAL-TV.

The station was popular for its weekend block of professional wrestling and roller derby including World Class Championship Wrestling, Mid-Atlantic Wrestling's syndicated show World Wide Wrestling and Los Angeles Thunderbirds roller games. KDOC also aired the locally produced wrestling program Championship Wrestling from Hollywood.

From 2009 until 2014, KDOC carried Southeastern Conference college football and basketball and Big 12 college basketball games supplied by ESPN Plus–operated services SEC TV and Big 12 Network, respectively. Both SEC TV and Big 12 Network were dissolved in August 2014, the first of which was caused by the 2014 launch of the pay-TV-only SEC Network, whose name was previously on the ESPN Plus syndicated SEC service. From 2014 until 2019, KDOC also broadcast Atlantic Coast Conference football and basketball games from the ACC Network syndication service of Raycom Sports, which was previously on Oxnard-licensed KBEH (channel 63, now Garden Grove-licensed KWHY) in the 2013–2014 season.

The station carried games of former Major League Soccer team Chivas USA from 2010 until the club's final season.

KDOC held the broadcast rights to games from the Anaheim Ducks of the NHL. During the 2020–21 NHL season, KDOC broadcast four Ducks games and one Los Angeles Kings game (which was a matchup against the Ducks, whose broadcast aired on Bally Sports West) due to overflow issues with Bally Sports and KCOP-TV. In September 2014, it was announced that KDOC would air the final six games of the Los Angeles Dodgers' 2014 season. The team's new broadcaster, SportsNet LA (now Spectrum SportsNet LA), had been afflicted by poor carriage throughout the season.

KDOC produced two telecasts of UC Irvine basketball games during the 2015–16 season in a partnership with UC Irvine. KDOC would later air UC Irvine's final regular season game of their 2018–19 season.

In January 2019, KDOC started airing a weekly high school basketball game on Friday or Saturday nights, branded as the Pacific Surfliner Game of the Week. In the partnership with Pacific Surfliner, the Big West Conference and UC Irvine, select Big West games are also televised.

KDOC carried select NCAA men's basketball tournament games featuring Southern California teams when more than one team in the viewing area played in the tournament at the exact same time (for example, while a first round UCLA game aired on KCBS, Cal State Fullerton aired on KDOC) so that all teams could be shown over-the-air. This practice ended in 2011 when all games were televised nationally through a partnership between CBS and Turner Sports.

=== Music programming ===
KDOC aired Request Video from 1987 until 1992. A one-hour show that featured live performances, commentary, and music videos, it was broadcast live from 5 to 6 p.m. on weekdays. While the programming originally leaned toward alternative music and developing bands, it later expanded to include more mainstream artists. In addition to Orange County bands such as No Doubt and Social Distortion, artists including Joy Division, De La Soul, Siouxsie and the Banshees, The Black Crowes, and Def Leppard were featured on Request Video.

=== Special programming ===
In May 1990, KDOC broadcast live coverage of the Strawberry Festival Parade in Garden Grove, California. Coverage moved from KHJ-TV after The Walt Disney Company (which acquired KHJ-TV and changed the call letters to KCAL-TV in December 1989) decided against broadcasting the parade that year.

On December 31, 2012, KDOC broadcast a live New Year's special hosted by comedian and actor Jamie Kennedy. Following its broadcast, the special gained infamy due to a large number of technical issues, dead air, unedited fleeting profanity, and a fight breaking out on-stage. A montage of clips from the special went viral after it was discovered by fellow comedian Patton Oswalt.

== Newscasts (1989–2022) ==
=== NewsWatch ===
After sporadic attempts at public affairs programming, in February 1989, KDOC jumped headlong into the local news business and started producing a five-day-a-week 8:30 p.m. newscast, known as NewsWatch, to cover news and events in Orange County. The newscast was produced until 1992, when a soft advertising market led the station to shut down all local production.

=== Daybreak OC ===
On September 10, 2007, KDOC-TV in partnership with the Orange County Register, launched a morning newscast named Daybreak OC. The show initially covered Orange County-specific weather, traffic and news headlines; the program was broadcast in high-definition from its launch, after the station's studios moved to the Register's headquarters in Santa Ana, California. On September 8, 2008, the program was cut to one hour, moved to late morning and focused less on news. On October 14, 2008, the program was canceled by KDOC following that day's show.

=== Eyewitness News on KDOC-TV ===
In January 2014, KDOC-TV started airing an hour-long 8 p.m. newscast produced by KABC-TV, titled ABC 7 Eyewitness News on LA56 (later rebranded as ABC 7 Eyewitness News on KDOC-TV); the newscast aired seven nights a week. Concurrently, the station also added a midnight rebroadcast of KABC's 11 p.m. newscast. On November 17, 2014, the 8 p.m. newscast moved to the 7 p.m. timeslot; the midnight rebroadcast of the 11 p.m. newscast was not affected. As a result of the station's sale, the final newscast produced by KABC aired on July 28, 2022.

== Technical information ==
=== Subchannels ===
The station's signal is multiplexed:

Subchannels of KDOC-TV
Subchannel	Res.	Short name	Programming
56.1	720p	KDOC HD	TCT
56.2	480i	ESNE	ESNE TV (Spanish religious)
56.3	480i	Me-TV	MeTV
56.4	480i	SBN	SonLife (4:3)
56.5	480i	MAJ-TV	Majestad TV (Spanish religious)
56.6	480i	CANAAN	Canaan (Spanish Religious)
56.7	480i	Genesis	Genesis TV (Spanish religious)
56.8	480i	TVA	Tele Vida Abundante (Spanish religious)
56.9	480i	Santida	Camino de Santidad (Spanish religious)
56.10	480i	LSTV	Little Saigon TV (Vietnamese)
56.11	480i	JTV	Jewelry TV Español
56.12	480i	ONTV4U	OnTV4U (4:3)

=== Translator ===
- K23IS-D Ridgecrest

=== Analog-to-digital conversion ===
KDOC began digital broadcast operations on February 18, 2004, at 12:19 p.m. The station ended regular programming on its analog signal, over UHF channel 56, at noon on February 17, 2009, (the original deadline for full-power stations to shut down prior to the extended June 12 deadline) as part of the federally mandated transition from analog to digital television. The station's digital signal remained on its pre-transition UHF channel 32, using virtual channel 56.

As part of the SAFER Act, KDOC kept its analog signal on the air until later in the afternoon on February 18 to inform viewers of the digital television transition through a loop of public service announcements from the National Association of Broadcasters.

== See also ==
- Hot Seat
- Short Ribbs
