= WAZT =

WAZT may refer to:

- WDME-CD, a low-power television station (channel 20, virtual 48) licensed to serve Washington, District of Columbia, United States
- WDCO-CD, a low-power television station (channel 24, virtual 10) licensed to serve Woodstock, Virginia, which held the call signs WAZT-LP, WAZT-CA, or WAZT-CD from 1994 to 2017
