= KHTV =

KHTV may refer to:

- KHTV-CD, a low-power television station (virtual channel 6, digital channel 22) licensed to serve Los Angeles, California, United States
- KIAH, a television station (channel 39 analog/38 digital) licensed to serve Houston, Texas, United States, which used the call sign KHTV until September 1999
