= KPOM =

KPOM may refer to:

- KPOM-CD, a low-power television station (channel 27, virtual 14) licensed to serve Ontario, California, United States
- KFTA-TV, a television station (channel 27, virtual 24) licensed to serve Fort Smith, Arkansas, United States, which held the call sign KPOM-TV from 1982 to 2004
