= WJSJ =

WJSJ may refer to:

- WJSJ-CD, a low-power television station (channel 28, virtual 51) licensed to serve Tipton, Indiana, United States
- WYKB, a radio station (105.3 FM) licensed to serve Fernandina Beach, Florida, United States, which held the call sign WJSJ from 2003 to 2016
