= KPAL =

KPAL may refer to:

- KPAL (FM), a radio station (91.3 FM) licensed to serve Palacios, Texas, United States
- KPAL-LP, a defunct low-power television station (channel 38) formerly licensed to serve Palmdale, California, United States
