= Weigel Broadcasting =

American television broadcasting company

Weigel Broadcasting Co.
- Type: Private
- Industry: Media
- Founded: June 4, 1964; 62 years ago
- Founder: John Weigel
- Headquarters: Chicago, Illinois, United States
- Key people: Norman Shapiro; (chairman & president); Neal Sabin; (vice chairman & president of Content & Networks); Kyle Walker; (vice president of Technology)
- Products: Television, Broadcasting
- Owner: Norman Shapiro
- Website: www.weigelbroadcasting.com

Weigel Broadcasting Co. is an American television broadcasting company based in Chicago, Illinois, alongside its flagship station WCIU-TV (Channel 26), at 26 North Halsted Street in the Greektown neighborhood. It currently owns 25 television stations, seven digital over-the-air television networks (most notably MeTV), and one radio station.

== History ==
The company was founded by Chicago broadcasting veteran John Weigel, whose career dated back to the 1930s. With $1,000 of his own money and another $1,000 from his attorney, Daniel J. McCarthy, Weigel bought the broadcasting license for what became the first UHF television station in the Chicago area. WCIU signed on the air on February 6, 1964. One year later, in 1965, the company was the subject of a successful hostile takeover at the hands of the Shapiro family.

Over the years, the company began to acquire and also launch new stations in the adjacent markets of Milwaukee and South Bend, at first by placing WCIU translators in those markets to gain a foothold in each market, before programming the stations independently. Weigel would end up an unexpected beneficiary of the television industry realignment of 1994–95. Full-power independent station WDJT-TV in Milwaukee, which had only signed on five years earlier, ended up with the CBS affiliation in late 1994. WBND-LP became the home of ABC programming in South Bend the next year. In both cases, the longtime affiliates of the networks in those markets — WITI in Milwaukee and WSJV in South Bend — switched to Fox, and the Weigel-owned stations secured 11th-hour affiliation deals after no other viable replacement affiliates surfaced.

Also in that same year, WCIU dropped the Spanish-language Univision network and became Chicago's only true full-power independent station when WGN-TV and WPWR-TV joined The WB and UPN networks respectively, while WGBO-TV became a Univision-owned station. These changes allowed WCIU to pursue sports rights and syndicated programming not previously available, ultimately giving WCIU some strength in the market.

Weigel's MeTV format originated as a programming block that debuted on January 6, 2003, on television station WFBT-CA (channel 23) in Chicago, Illinois, an independent station that otherwise featured an ethnic programming format.

In April 2008, Weigel completed the purchase of WJJA-TV in Racine, Wisconsin, which gave the company its second full-power station in the Milwaukee market. The station carried a local version of MeTV for four years before it and the independent format of low-power WMLW-CA were switched around in August 2012, becoming WMLW-TV.

=== Network expansion ===
In July 2008, Weigel announced the creation of This TV, a national subchannel network, operated as a joint venture with Metro-Goldwyn-Mayer.

In early August 2008, Weigel agreed to sell all three of its South Bend stations, WBND-LP, WCWW-LP and WMYS-LP, to Schurz Communications, the longtime owner of the local CBS affiliate WSBT-TV, for undisclosed terms. However, in the absence of action by the Federal Communications Commission, the deal was called off in August 2009.

Weigel launched You and Me This Morning, an Interstitial program lifestyle news program in fourth quarter (fall) 2009 on WCIU-TV's first two subchannels.

At the end of 2009, Broadcasting & Cable gave Weigel its first annual Multi-Platform Broadcaster of the Year award. The company makes efficient use of digital TV's multicast capabilities, with one main channel and four subchannels for WCIU in Chicago, and MeTV and This TV on subchannels nationwide.

On November 22, 2010, Weigel announced that they would take the MeTV concept national and compete fully with RTV and Antenna TV, while complementing its successful sister network This TV.

On December 1, 2010, WCIU dropped their FBT foreign broadcasting digital subchannel (with some of that programming eventually to be moved to Polnet Communications' WPVN-CA) and is currently airing a simulcast of WCIU-TV on WCIU digital subchannel 26.2. The new digital subchannel, The U Too, was officially launched on January 5, 2011. The new digital network airs on WCIU digital subchannel 26.2, replacing MeTV, which moved to WCIU digital subchannel 26.3 on December 15, 2010, and mainly consists of other purchased programming without room on the main WCIU schedule, second runs of WCIU programming or programming burned off due to low ratings.

On January 4, 2011, Metro-Goldwyn-Mayer and Weigel announced plans to distribute MeTV nationwide.

On January 28, 2013, Weigel Broadcasting announced the formation of Movies!, with an agreement with Fox Television Stations to add the channel on the subchannels of 17 Fox O&O stations. On May 13, 2013, Weigel announced that Tribune Broadcasting would take over operations of This TV on November 1, and that the channel would move to a WGN-TV subchannel following the changes.

On July 1, 2013, Weigel premiered the subchannel service TouchVision, which provided a rolling news and information service designed for television, mobile and tablet platforms starting on WDJT-DT4, after Milwaukee real estate agency Shorewest Realtors ended their time-lease on the channel space to concentrate on an Internet on-demand channel instead. TouchVision was based out of Weigel's Chicago facilities under the LLC "Think Televisual", and was run by former radio and Tribune executive Lee Abrams and Brandon Davis. TouchVision ceased operations on January 14, 2016.

On September 29, 2014, Weigel launched Heroes & Icons, a new digital subchannel which specializes in reruns of classic television series and films. Heroes & Icons, abbreviated H&I, aims to attract a generally male audience with shows from the genres of action, police, detective, western, science fiction, superhero, and war and military.

On October 21, 2014, Weigel and CBS announced the launch of the digital subchannel service called Decades, that was scheduled to launch on all CBS O&O stations in 2015. The channel was co-owned by Weigel and CBS, with Weigel being responsible for distribution to stations outside CBS Television Stations. It aired programs from the extensive library of CBS Television Distribution, including archival footage from CBS News.

=== Post-spectrum auction expansion ===
On July 19, 2017, Weigel agreed to acquire Cedar City, Utah station KCSG for $1.1 million. The sale converted the station in a H&I owned-and-operated station, though the possibility of Weigel's other networks being contained to it is also possible. It was Weigel's first station purchase outside of a state along Lake Michigan, as all of its properties were in Illinois, Indiana and Wisconsin. This sale closed December 5, 2017.

On September 8, 2017, it was announced that Weigel agreed to purchase Los Angeles, California station KAZA-TV for $9 million. The same day also saw the announcement of the purchase of KNLC in St. Louis, a religious station holding a commercial license, for $3.75 million. Many of its purchases since 2017 have been made through its LLC for WMLW. It sold that station's spectrum in the 2016 FCC auction for $69.7 million, with WMLW itself re-transitioning to the spectrum of WBME-CD. KNLC's former owners continue to maintain a right to the station's second subchannel to carry their schedule as a part of the sale to Weigel.

On October 18, 2017, Weigel agreed to acquire KAXT-CD and KTLN-TV, in San Francisco and KVOS-TV and KFFV in Seattle, from OTA Broadcasting in a $23.2 million deal. The Seattle deal was completed, while the San Francisco completion took until April 15, 2019, as both KAXT-CD and KTLN-TV are involved in a spectrum transition resulting from the 2016 FCC auction.

On July 18, 2018, CBS Television Stations and Weigel Broadcasting announced the formation of Start TV, with plans to launch the network on Labor Day of that year (September 3). The network focuses on women-led police procedurals and procedural dramas.

On May 30, 2019, Marquee Broadcasting agreed to sell KREG-TV (formerly a satellite of KREX-TV) to Weigel Broadcasting for $2 million. Once the sale closed, the station became an H&I owned-and-operated station, and likely be positioned as Weigel's station in the Denver market (many stations surrounding Denver have used cable and satellite carriage to take advantage of the larger market reach).

September 1, 2019, saw WCIU-TV taking over the affiliation for The CW in Chicago as "CW 26", replacing Fox-owned WPWR-TV and resulting in the move of some programming and that station's former "The U" branding to WMEU-CD.

In December 2019, Weigel agreed to purchase low-power WHCT-LD in the Hartford, Connecticut market from Venture Technologies Group LLC for $1.5 million.

On September 11, 2020, Weigel announced that it was buying WJFB in Lebanon, Tennessee (serving the Nashville television market), from HC2 Holdings for $5.5 million, pending FCC approval. On October 28, Weigel announced it would acquire KAZD in Dallas, KYAZ in Houston, KMOH-TV in Kingman, Arizona, and its Phoenix translator KEJR-LD from HC2, for $35 million. The sale of the Arizona and Texas stations, which at the time of acquisition were all affiliated with Azteca América and later converted to MeTV owned-and-operated stations, was completed on December 29. All of the HC2 sales except for WJFB came with the move of the Azteca America affiliations to subchannels under long-term affiliation agreements with Weigel.

On May 3, 2021, Weigel announced it would launch MeTV+ in Chicago and Kingman on May 15, airing more classic shows, some of which are airing on other Weigel stations (i.e. MeTV, H&I).

On September 1, 2021, Weigel acquired WZME in Bridgeport, Connecticut, moving into the New York/Tri-State market for the first time. On October 11, 2021, Weigel filed to acquire WJLP, licensed to Middletown Township, New Jersey and transmitting from 4 Times Square, from PMCM TV LLC for $62.5 million. In March 2022, Weigel filed to purchase Cleveland, Ohio-based W27EA-D.

On February 14, 2022, Weigel announced that it would launch Story Television, a digital multicast network, on March 28, 2022. The network's focus is on historical and factual programming and utilizes the library of the cable network History, expanding its non-fiction offerings beyond Through the Decades.

On February 13, 2023, Weigel announced that Decades would be re-branded as Catchy Comedy on March 27, 2023. It would focus on classic sitcoms weekdays with comedy marathons on weekends.

On December 29, 2023, CBS Media Ventures re-launched Dabl, pivoting it from lifestyle programming to Black-oriented sitcoms owned by their parent company Paramount Global. Weigel took over operations of the channel at this time, although the network is still fully owned by CBS.

On May 1, 2024, Weigel announced that it would launch MeTV Toons on June 25, airing classic cartoons like Looney Tunes, Merrie Melodies, Tom and Jerry, Popeye, The Flintstones, The Jetsons, The Real Ghostbusters, Scooby-Doo, Yogi Bear and Rocky and Bullwinkle, among others.

On June 17, 2025, Weigel announced that it would launch WEST (Western Entertainment Series Television) in the fall of 2025, airing classic TV westerns such as Gunsmoke, Bonanza, Maverick, Wanted Dead or Alive, The Virginian, Rawhide, Wagon Train, The High Chaparral, The Wild Wild West and many more.

== Major assets ==
=== Television stations ===
Stations arranged alphabetically by state and by market area. Most of the stations are categorized into separate limited partnerships for licensing purposes, with many of Weigel's post-2017 deals using the WMLW limited partnership as a direct result of the profits from that station's spectrum sale.

Notes:

- (**) - Indicates stations built and signed on by Weigel.

City of license / Market	State	Station	Channel TV (RF)	Owned since	Network affiliation
Birmingham–Tuscaloosa	Alabama	WRDY-LD	2 (32→8)	2021	Classic Shows
Birmingham–Tuscaloosa	Alabama	W16DS-D	47 (16)	2026	WEST (47.1); Movies! (47.2); OnTV4U (47.12)
Kingman	Arizona	KMEE-TV	6 (19)	2020	MeTV (6.1); MeTV+ (6.2); Story Television (6.3); MeTV Toons (6.4); WEST (6.5)
Phoenix	Arizona	K32PG-D	40 (32)	2020	MeTV (6.1); MeTV+ (6.2); Story Television (6.3); MeTV Toons (6.4); WEST (6.5)
Flagstaff	Arizona	K23QE-D	40 (23)	–	MeTV (6.1); MeTV+ (6.2); Story Television (6.3); MeTV Toons (6.4); WEST (6.5)
Clarksville–Little Rock	Arkansas	KKME-LD	3 (31)	2025	Catchy Comedy (3.1); MeTV Toons (3.2); MeTV+ (3.3); Movies! (3.4); Story Television (3.5); WEST (3.6); Heroes & Icons (3.7)
Los Angeles	California	KHTV-CD	6 (22)	2021	MeTV+
Los Angeles	California	KPOM-CD	14 (27)	2021	Catchy Comedy (14.1); OnTV4U (14.12)
Los Angeles	California	KSFV-CD	27 (27)	2021	MeTV Toons (27.1); WEST (27.2); Jewelry Television (27.3)
Los Angeles	California	KAZA-TV	54 (22)	2018	MeTV (54.1); Story Television (54.2); MeTV Toons (54.3); WEST (54.4); Heroes & Icons (54.5)
Los Angeles	California	KVME-TV	20 (20)	2021	Jewelry Television (20.1); WEST (20.2); MeTV Toons (20.3)
Modesto	California	KKRR-LD	20 (20→29)	–	WEST (20.1); Catchy Comedy (20.2); Movies! (20.3)
San Francisco	California	KAXT-CD	1 (22)	2019	Catchy Comedy
San Francisco	California	KTLN-TV	68 (22)	2019	Heroes & Icons (68.1); MeTV (68.2); Story Television (68.3); MeTV+ (68.4); Quest (68.5); MeTV Toons (68.6); WEST (68.7)
Glenwood Springs–Denver	Colorado	KREG-TV	3 (23)	2020	MeTV (3.1); Heroes & Icons (3.2); Start TV (3.3); Catchy Comedy (3.4); Movies! (3.5); MeTV+ (3.6); Story Television (3.7); MeTV Toons (3.8); WEST (3.9)
Rifle	Colorado	K27PL-D	3 (27)	–	MeTV (3.1); Heroes & Icons (3.2); Start TV (3.3); Catchy Comedy (3.4); Movies! (3.5); MeTV+ (3.6); Story Television (3.7); MeTV Toons (3.8); WEST (3.9)
Hartford–New Haven	Connecticut	WHCT-LD	35 (35)	2021	MeTV (35.1); Heroes & Icons (35.2); Start TV (35.3); Movies! (35.4); Catchy Comedy (35.5); MeTV+ (35.6); Story Television (35.7); MeTV Toons (35.8); Dabl (35.9); WEST (35.10)
Washington	District of Columbia	WDME-CD	48 (20)	2021	MeTV (48.1); Story Television (48.2); Catchy Comedy (48.3); MeTV+ (48.4); MeTV Toons (48.5); Dabl (48.6); WEST (48.7); OnTV4U (48.12)
Jacksonville	Florida	WJKF-CD	9 (28)	2025	WEST (9.1); Heroes & Icons (9.2); MeTV+ (9.3); Story Television (9.4); OnTV4U (9.12)
Ocala	Florida	W30EM-D	30 (30)	2021	Informercials
Orlando	Florida	WOME-LD	11 (3)	2021	OnTV4U
West Palm Beach	Florida	W24GG-D	8 (24)	2026	Silent
Atlanta	Georgia	WSKC-CD	22 (14)	2025	MeTV Toons (22.1); Story Television (22.2); OnTV4U (22.12)
Gainesville	Georgia	W29GB-D	22 (29)	–	MeTV Toons (22.1); Story Television (22.2); OnTV4U (22.12)
Chicago	Illinois	WWME-CD	23 (20)	1992	MeTV (23.1); Heroes & Icons (23.2); OnTV4U (23.12)
Chicago	Illinois	WCIU-TV **	26 (23)	1964	Independent (26.1); The U Too (26.2); MeTV (26.3); Heroes & Icons (26.4); Story Television (26.5); Catchy Comedy (26.6); MeTV Toons (26.7); WEST (26.8)
Chicago	Illinois	WMEU-CD	48 (18)	2004	Independent (48.1); Start TV (48.2); Catchy Comedy (48.3); MeTV+ (48.4)
Rockford	Illinois	WFBN-LD	35 (23)	1989	Heroes & Icons (35.1); Telemundo (35.2); Story Television (35.3)
Evansville	Indiana	WZDS-LD	5 (18)	2021	Heroes & Icons (5.1); Start TV (5.2); Movies! (5.3); Catchy Comedy (5.4); Story Television (5.5); Dabl (5.6); WEST (5.7)
Indianapolis	Indiana	WJSJ-CD	51 (14)	2025	WEST (51.1); Start TV (51.2); Dabl (51.3); Heroes & Icons (51.4); MeTV Toons (51.5)
South Bend	Indiana	WCWW-LD	25 (25)	2002	The CW (25.1); Start TV (25.2); MeTV Toons (25.3); MeTV+ (25.4); Story Television (25.5); WEST (25.6); OnTV4U (25.12)
South Bend	Indiana	WBND-LD	57 (35)	1990	ABC (57.1); MeTV (57.2); Movies! (57.3)
South Bend	Indiana	WMYS-LD	69 (28)	1987	Heroes & Icons (69.1, primary); MyNetworkTV (69.1, secondary); Telemundo (69.2); Catchy Comedy (69.3); Dabl (69.4)
Des Moines	Iowa	KDIT-CD	45 (17)	2021	Catchy Comedy (45.1); Movies! (45.2); Start TV (45.3); MeTV Toons (45.4); WEST (45.5); Infomercials (45.12)
Fort Dodge	Iowa	K17PS-D	45 (17→11)	–	Catchy Comedy (45.1); Movies! (45.2); Start TV (45.3); MeTV Toons (45.4); WEST (45.5); Infomercials (45.12)
Baltimore	Maryland	W20FS-D	35 (20)	2026	Silent
Marshfield–Springfield	Missouri	KKSP-LD	4 (14)	2026	Heroes & Icons (4.1); Start TV (4.2); Catchy Comedy (4.3); Movies! (4.4); WEST (4.5); Story Television (4.6); MeTV Toons (4.7); Dabl (4.8); OnTV4U (4.12)
St. Louis	Missouri	KNLC	24 (14)	2017	MeTV (24.1); MeTV Toons (24.2); Heroes & Icons (24.3); Movies! (24.4); Catchy Comedy (24.5); Start TV (24.6); WEST (24.7); Story Television (24.8); Dabl (24.9); MeTV+ (24.10)
Ely	Nevada	KKEL	27 (27)	2024	Story Television (27.1); Catchy Comedy (27.2); Start TV (27.3); Heroes & Icons (27.4); WEST (27.5); MeTV (27.6); Movies! (27.7); MeTV Toons (27.8); Dabl (27.9); MeTV+ (27.10)
Las Vegas	Nevada	K10RX-D	9 (10)	2026	MeTV (9.1); Catchy Comedy (9.2); WEST (9.3); Dabl (9.4); MeTV Toons (9.5); MeTV+ (9.6); Start TV (9.7)
Tonopah	Nevada	KBWT	9 (9)	2022	MeTV (9.1); Catchy Comedy (9.2); WEST (9.3); Dabl (9.4); MeTV Toons (9.5); MeTV+ (9.6); Start TV (9.7)
Carlsbad	New Mexico	KKAC	19 (19)	2022	Story Television (19.1); Catchy Comedy (19.2); Start TV (19.3); Movies! (19.4); MeTV Toons (19.5); Dabl (19.6); WEST (19.7)
Silver City	New Mexico	KKAD	10 (10)	2022	Start TV (10.1); Catchy Comedy (10.2); Story Television (10.3); Movies! (10.4); MeTV Toons (10.5); Dabl (10.6); WEST (10.7)
Farmington	New Mexico	K35PZ-D	35 (35)	–	WEST (12.1); Start TV (12.2); Dabl (12.3); Catchy Comedy (12.4); MeTV Toons (12.5); Movies! (12.6); Story Television (12.7)
Albuquerque–Santa Fe	New Mexico	K19NO-D	12 (19)	–	WEST (12.1); Start TV (12.2); Dabl (12.3); Catchy Comedy (12.4); MeTV Toons (12.5); Movies! (12.6); Story Television (12.7)
Taos	New Mexico	K35QA-D	12 (35)	–	WEST (12.1); Start TV (12.2); Dabl (12.3); Catchy Comedy (12.4); MeTV Toons (12.5); Movies! (12.6); Story Television (12.7)
Truth or Consequences	New Mexico	KKAB	12 (12)	2025	WEST (12.1); Start TV (12.2); Dabl (12.3); Catchy Comedy (12.4); MeTV Toons (12.5); Movies! (12.6); Story Television (12.7)
New York City	New York	WJLP	33 (3)	2021	MeTV (33.1); MeTV Toons (33.2); Laff (33.3); WEST (33.4); The Nest (33.6); Story Television (33.7); MeTV+ (33.8)
New York City	New York	WNWT-LD	37 (3)	2021	Story Television
New York City	New York	WZME	43 (21)	2021	Story Television (43.1); MeTV+ (43.2); MeTV (43.3); MeTV Toons (43.4); Retro TV (43.8); Heartland (43.9); OnTV4U (43.12)
Charlotte	North Carolina	WGTB-CD	28 (27)	2026	The Walk TV
Cleveland	Ohio	WOCV-CD	35 (27)	2022	Catchy Comedy (35.1); Story Television (35.2); MeTV Toons (35.3); Movies! (35.4); Dabl (35.5); WEST (35.6); Infomercials (35.12)
Astoria	Oregon	K36LI-D	41 (36)	2021	Heroes & Icons (41.1); Start TV (41.2); Movies! (41.3); Catchy Comedy (41.4); MeTV+ (41.5); Story Television (41.6); Heroes & Icons (41.7); Dabl (41.8); WEST (41.9)
Dallas	Oregon	K35PX-D	41 (35)	–	Heroes & Icons (41.1); Start TV (41.2); Movies! (41.3); Catchy Comedy (41.4); MeTV+ (41.5); Story Television (41.6); Heroes & Icons (41.7); Dabl (41.8); WEST (41.9)
Portland	Oregon	KPME-CD	41 (15)	2025	Heroes & Icons (41.1); Start TV (41.2); Movies! (41.3); Catchy Comedy (41.4); MeTV+ (41.5); Story Television (41.6); Heroes & Icons (41.7); Dabl (41.8); WEST (41.9)
Pittsburgh	Pennsylvania	WPPW-LD	34 (34)	2026	Silent
Knoxville	Tennessee	W20FG-D	31 (20)	2026	Silent
Memphis	Tennessee	WNBA-LD	2 (7)	2026	Dabl (2.1); Catchy Comedy (2.2); WEST (2.3); MeTV Toons (2.4); Story Television (2.5); Movies! (2.6); Informercials (2.12)
Nashville	Tennessee	WJFB	44 (25)	2020	MeTV (44.1); Heroes & Icons (44.2); Start TV (44.3); Catchy Comedy (44.4); Movies! (44.5); WEST (44.6); Story Television (44.7); MeTV Toons (44.8); MeTV+ (44.10); OnTV4U (44.12)
Dallas–Fort Worth	Texas	KAZD	55 (31)	2020	WEST (55.1); MeTV (55.2); MeTV Toons (55.3); MeTV+ (55.4); Story Television (55.5); Catchy Comedy (55.6)
Houston	Texas	KYAZ	51 (25)	2020	MeTV (51.1); MeTV+ (51.2); Dabl (51.3); Story Television (51.4); WEST (51.5); Infomercials (51.12)
Cedar City	Utah	KCSG	8 (14)	2017	MeTV (8.1); Catchy Comedy (8.2); Start TV (8.3); Heroes & Icons (8.4); WEST (8.5); Story Television (8.6); Movies! (8.7); MeTV Toons (8.8); Dabl (8.9); MeTV+ (8.10)
Logan	Utah	K08QL-D	8 (8)	–	MeTV (8.1); Catchy Comedy (8.2); Start TV (8.3); Heroes & Icons (8.4); WEST (8.5); Story Television (8.6); Movies! (8.7); MeTV Toons (8.8); Dabl (8.9); MeTV+ (8.10)
Salt Lake City	Utah	K18OI-D	8 (18)	–	MeTV (8.1); Catchy Comedy (8.2); Start TV (8.3); Heroes & Icons (8.4); WEST (8.5); Story Television (8.6); Movies! (8.7); MeTV Toons (8.8); Dabl (8.9); MeTV+ (8.10)
St. George	Utah	K16DS-D	8 (16)	–	MeTV (8.1); Catchy Comedy (8.2); Start TV (8.3); Heroes & Icons (8.4); WEST (8.5); Story Television (8.6); Movies! (8.7); MeTV Toons (8.8); Dabl (8.9); MeTV+ (8.10)
Yorktown–Norfolk	Virginia	WYSJ-CD	19 (36)	2025	Story Television (19.1); WEST (19.2); Heroes & Icons (19.3); OnTV4U (19.12)
Seattle–Bellingham	Washington	KFFV	44 (16)	2018	MeTV (44.1); Movies! (44.2); Heroes & Icons (44.3); Catchy Comedy (44.4); MeTV+ (44.5); Story Television (44.6); MeTV Toons (44.7); WEST (44.8); OnTV4U (44.12)
Seattle–Bellingham	Washington	KVOS-TV	12 (14)	2018	Univision (12.1); Movies! (12.2); MeTV (12.3); Catchy Comedy (12.4); Start TV (12.5); MeTV+ (12.6); Story Television (12.7); Heroes & Icons (12.8); MeTV Toons (12.9)
Seattle–Bellingham	Washington	K08QY-D	12 (8)	–	Univision (12.1); Movies! (12.2); MeTV (12.3); Catchy Comedy (12.4); Start TV (12.5); MeTV+ (12.6); Story Television (12.7); Heroes & Icons (12.8); MeTV Toons (12.9)
Green Bay	Wisconsin	WMEI **	31 (31)	2024	MeTV (31.1); MeTV Toons (31.2); Story Television (31.3); WEST (31.4); Movies! (31.5); Telemundo (31.6); Catchy Comedy (31.7); Dabl (31.8); MeTV+ (31.9)
Oshkosh	Wisconsin	W16EP-D	31 (16)	–	MeTV (31.1); MeTV Toons (31.2); Story Television (31.3); WEST (31.4); Movies! (31.5); Telemundo (31.6); Catchy Comedy (31.7); Dabl (31.8); MeTV+ (31.9)
Milwaukee	Wisconsin	WBME-CD	41 (17)	1983	MeTV
Milwaukee	Wisconsin	WMLW-TV	49 (17)	2008	Independent (49.1); Movies! (49.2); Heroes & Icons (49.3); Catchy Comedy (49.4); MeTV Toons (49.5)
Milwaukee	Wisconsin	WDJT-TV **	58 (29)	1988	CBS (58.1); MeTV (58.2); Independent (58.3); Telemundo (58.4); Start TV (58.5)
Milwaukee	Wisconsin	WYTU-LD	63 (16)	1989	Telemundo (63.1); Start TV (63.2); WEST (63.3); MeTV+ (63.4); OnTV4U (63.12)

=== Television networks ===
- Catchy Comedy (launched on May 25, 2015, as Decades; rebranded as Catchy Comedy on March 27, 2023; focus on classic sitcoms)
- Dabl (launched on September 9, 2019, with a female-targeted lifestyle format; owned by CBS Media Ventures; managed by Weigel since 2023; since 2023, focuses on black sitcoms)
- H&I – Heroes & Icons (launched on September 28, 2014; on WCIU-TV, WMLW-TV; focus on action/adventure, westerns, crime dramas, sci-fi, and superhero series)
- MeTV – Memorable Entertainment Television (launched on January 6, 2003, as a block on WFBT-CA; launched on January 1, 2005, as a program format in Chicago on WWME-CA; launched on December 15, 2010, as a national network; focus on classic programming)
- MeTV+ (launched on May 15, 2021; MeTV brand extension with additional series)
- MeTV Toons (launched on June 25, 2024; focus on classic animation)
- Movies! (launched on May 27, 2013; focus on feature films)
- Start TV (launched on September 3, 2018; joint venture with CBS News and Stations; focus on women-led dramas, police and legal procedurals)
- Story Television (launched on March 28, 2022; focus on history)
- WEST – Western Entertainment Series Television (launched on September 29, 2025; focus on classic TV westerns)

=== Radio station ===
- WRME-LD 87.7FM – branded as "MeTV FM" (Chicago, Illinois; local marketing agreement with Venture Technologies Group) (also broadcasts TV signal on digital TV channel 6)
