= WDME-CD =

Television station in Washington, D.C.

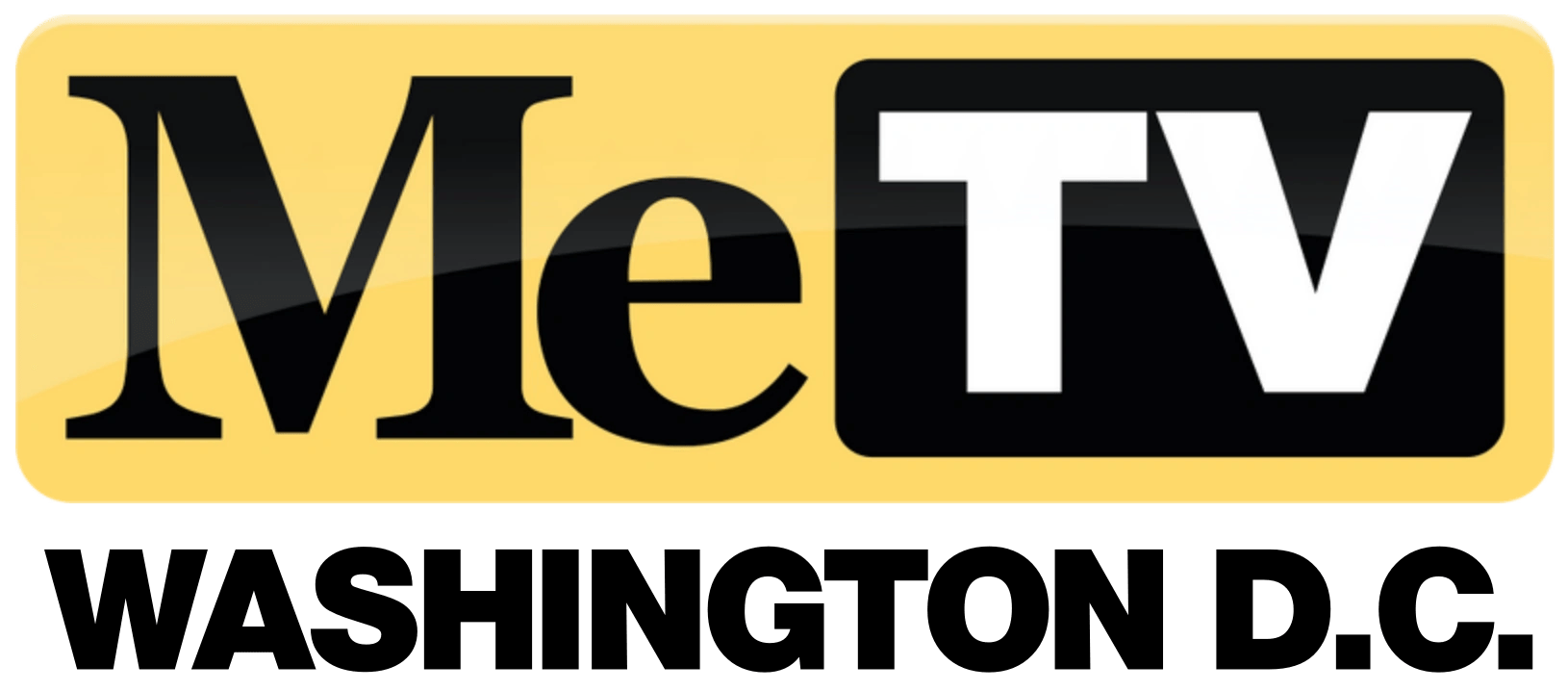
- Washington, D.C.; United States
- Channels: Digital: 20 (UHF); Virtual: 48
- Branding: MeTV Washington D.C.

Programming
- Affiliations: 48.1: MeTV; for others, see § Subchannels

Ownership
- Owner: Weigel Broadcasting; (TV-49, Inc.)

History
- Founded: May 16, 1989
- First air date: September 29, 1989
- Former call signs: W48AZ (1989–1999); WAZW-LP (1999–2000); WAZW-CA (2000–2014); WAZW-CD (2014–2017); WAZT-CD (2017–2022)
- Former channel numbers: Analog: 48 (UHF, 1989–2010); Digital: 46 (UHF, 2007–2017), 26 (UHF, 2017–2018)
- Former affiliations: Religious Independent (1989–2018); Jewelry TV (2018–2022)

Technical information
- Licensing authority: FCC
- Facility ID: 168449
- Class: CD
- ERP: 15 kW
- HAAT: 172.6 m (566 ft)
- Transmitter coordinates: 38°56′24.2″N 77°4′52.5″W

Links
- Public license information: Public file; LMS

WDME-CD (channel 48) is a low-power, Class A television station in Washington, D.C., airing programming from the classic television network MeTV. Owned by Weigel Broadcasting, the station maintains a transmitter in Ward Circle in Washington's northwest quadrant.

== History ==
The station signed on for the first time on September 29, 1989, as W48AZ in Winchester, Virginia, a relay of the original WAZT-LP in Woodstock (then W10AZ, now WDCO-CD). The WAZT network offered some programming from Cornerstone and other religious networks, but it generally did not show them in-pattern with those networks, and it also broadcast some secular syndicated programming and classic television shows.

W48AZ changed its callsign to WAZW-LP on August 20, 1999. The station gained Class A status on December 26, 2000, becoming WAZW-CA.

Ruarch sold the WAZT stations to JLA Media & Publications (no relation to ABC affiliate WJLA-TV, channel 7) in 2006. Jones Broadcasting acquired the stations out of Chapter 7 bankruptcy in 2011.

Jones Broadcasting sold the group of stations to Venture Technologies Group in December 2013. Venture immediately began moving WAZT and its sister stations to the far larger Washington, D.C. television market. After spending most of its time as a religious broadcaster branded as simply "WAZT", the station and its relays changed to the branding "Faith Television Network" under Venture's ownership.

WAZT-CD's callsign was changed to WDCO-CD on October 11, 2017. On the same day, Winchester repeater WAZW-CD became WAZT-CD. On January 24, 2018, Faith Television Network announced it would cease broadcasting. All four remaining stations in the network became full-time affiliates of Jewelry Television on January 31.

On June 25, 2020, Venture Technologies Group filed an agreement with the FCC to sell WDCO-CD and WIAV-CD to Sinclair Broadcast Group (owner of WJLA-TV) for $8.5 million. The sale was completed on October 15, making them Sinclair's second and third properties in the Washington market, alongside WJLA-TV. On the same day, WDCO-CD and WIAV-CD flipped to Sinclair's TBD multicast network, simulcasting WJLA-TV's fourth digital subchannel in 1080i full high definition.

WAZT-CD was not included in the sale and continued to air Jewelry TV programming. It was later sold to Weigel Broadcasting in September 2021 for $3 million. On April 21, 2022, the station's callsign changed to WDME-CD.

== Subchannels ==
The station's signal is multiplexed:

Subchannels of WDME-CD
Subchannel	Res.	Short name	Programming
48.1	720p	MeTV	MeTV
48.2	480i	Story	Story Television
48.3	480i	Catchy	Catchy Comedy
48.4	480i	MeTV+	MeTV+
48.5	480i	TOONS	MeTV Toons
48.6	480i	Dabl	Dabl
48.7	480i	WEST	WEST
48.12	480i	EMLW	OnTV4U (infomercials)
