= KPOM-CD =

Television station in Ontario, California

- Ontario–Los Angeles, California; United States
- City: Ontario, California
- Channels: Digital: 27 (UHF), shared with KSFV-CD; Virtual: 14
- Branding: Catchy Comedy Los Angeles

Programming
- Affiliations: 14.1: Catchy Comedy

Ownership
- Owner: Weigel Broadcasting; (KPOM-TV LLC)
- Sister stations: KAZA-TV, KHTV-CD, KSFV-CD, KVME-TV

History
- Founded: August 23, 1989
- Former call signs: K06MB (1989–2012); KKKK-CA (2012–2013); KPOM-CA (2013–2014)
- Former channel numbers: Analog: 14 (UHF, 1989–2014)
- Former affiliations: Retro TV; Spanish religious music; ShopHQ; MeTV Plus (until 2022); Story Television (March–May 2022)

Technical information
- Licensing authority: FCC
- Facility ID: 191793
- Class: CD
- ERP: 15 kW
- HAAT: 899.4 m (2,951 ft)
- Transmitter coordinates: 34°12′46.1″N 118°3′44.8″W

Links
- Public license information: Public file; LMS

KPOM-CD (channel 14) is a low-power, Class A television station in Ontario, California, United States, broadcasting the digital multicast network Catchy Comedy to the Los Angeles area. Owned by Weigel Broadcasting, the station broadcasts from a transmitter, shared with KSFV-CD, at the Mount Harvard Radio Site in the San Gabriel Mountains.

Due to its low-power status, KPOM-CD's broadcasting radius does not reach all of Greater Los Angeles. Therefore, the station shares Catchy Comedy with the fourth subchannel of KTTV (channel 11).

== History ==
The station was founded on August 23, 1989. Originally licensed to Indio, California, it carried Retro TV programming via KRET-LP (channel 45). It later became a Spanish religious music channel, then an affiliate of ShopHQ with KDUO (channel 43) for the Palm Springs area.

In January 2022, Weigel Broadcasting removed KPOM-CD's subchannels and replacing the programming on main channel 14.1 with a simulcast of MeTV+ on KAZA 54.3. On February 28, 2022, the MeTV+ simulcast ended and was replaced with KPOM-CD's own feed of Decades. With this change, 14.1 was upgraded to 720p HD. On March 28, 2022, Story Television launched, replacing Decades. On May 26, 2022, Story Television moved to sister station KAZA 54.2, with Decades returning to KPOM-CD 14.1. On August 1, 2022, KPOM-CD added paid programming from OnTV4U on digital subchannel 14.12.

== Subchannels ==
The station's signal is multiplexed:

Subchannels of KPOM-CD and KSFV-CD
| License | Subchannel | Res. | Short name | Programming |
|---|---|---|---|---|
| KPOM-CD | 14.1 | 720p | KPOM | Catchy Comedy |
| KPOM-CD | 14.12 | 480i | EMLW | OnTV4U (infomercials) |
| KSFV-CD | 27.1 | 720p | TOONS | MeTV Toons |
| KSFV-CD | 27.2 | 720p | WEST | WEST |
| KSFV-CD | 27.3 | 480i | JEWELRY | Jewelry TV |
