= KVME-TV =

Television station in Bishop, California

- Bishop–Mammoth Lakes–; Los Angeles, California; United States
- City: Bishop, California
- Channels: Digital: 20 (UHF); Virtual: 20

Programming
- Affiliations: 20.1: Jewelry Television; 20.2: WEST; 20.3: MeTV Toons

Ownership
- Owner: Weigel Broadcasting; (KVME-TV LLC)
- Sister stations: KAZA-TV, KHTV-CD, KPOM-CD, KSFV-CD

History
- First air date: August 21, 2007
- Former call signs: KBBC-TV (2007–2012)
- Former channel number: Analog: 20 (UHF, 2007–2008)
- Former affiliations: Spanish Independent (2007–2012); MeTV (2012–2018); Heroes & Icons (2018–2019 on 20.1, 2019–2025 on 20.2)
- Call sign meaning: Venture Memorable Entertainment (slogan of MeTV, station's previous affiliation)

Technical information
- Licensing authority: FCC
- Facility ID: 83825
- ERP: 1.9 kW
- HAAT: 924 m (3,031 ft)
- Transmitter coordinates: 37°24′42.7″N 118°11′9.3″W

Links
- Public license information: Public file; LMS

KVME-TV (channel 20) is a television station licensed to Bishop, California, United States, serving the Los Angeles television market as an affiliate of Jewelry Television. It is owned by Weigel Broadcasting alongside Avalon-licensed MeTV station KAZA-TV (channel 54). KVME-TV's studios are located on North Main Street in Bishop, and its transmitter is located in the White Mountains, about 20 miles (32 km) east of Bishop.

== History ==
The station signed on the air on August 21, 2007, as KBBC-TV on analog channel 20, operating as a bilingual independent. KBBC's programming was mostly Spanish, featuring such shows as La Corte del Pueblo (a Spanish-language version of The People's Court), La Corte de Familia, the daily soccer program Fútbol al Día from Monterrey-based Multimedios Televisión, and a newscast with extensive coverage from Central America. The nighttime programming had premiered on KNLA-LP, which was a translator station.

The station later added afternoon and overnight programming from the Home Shopping Network. KBBC also offered English-language religious programming from Hosanna, a Christian program service. On Saturday mornings, English-language children's programs aired along with a public affairs program, Eastern Sierra News.

In March 2012, Venture Technologies Group filed and received approval to sell KNLA-CD and sister station KNET-CD to Local Media TV Holdings. On March 9, KBBC-TV's callsign was changed to KVME-TV.

=== Affiliation changes ===
==== MeTV ====
KVME-TV became affiliated with MeTV on April 30, 2012, sharing the affiliation with the third digital subchannel of Anaheim-based KDOC-TV (channel 56). KVME-TV carried MeTV on their primary digital channel 20 (virtual channel 20.1), which is also available on the DirecTV and Dish Network local packages tier for the Los Angeles market. KVME-TV and KDOC-TV marketed the subchannel as "MeTV Hollywood", changing from KDOC's previous brand of "MeTV Los Angeles". Local advertising for MeTV Hollywood was sold by a jointly managed ad sales team for both stations. However, KVME-TV's MeTV feed did not carry the full schedule of programming, electing to carry Spanish-language religious and paid programming during the early morning weekday hours of 5 to 8 a.m., preempting regularly scheduled programming within those hours. The MeTV affiliation ended on January 15, 2018.

==== Heroes & Icons ====
On January 15, 2018, KVME-TV became an affiliate of MeTV's sister network, Heroes & Icons, sharing the affiliation with the fourth digital subchannel of Los Angeles-based KCOP-TV (channel 13). Like the previous affiliation with MeTV, KVME-TV's Heroes & Icons feed did not carry the full schedule of programming, electing to carry Spanish-language religious and paid programming during the early morning weekday hours of 7 to 10 a.m., preempting regularly scheduled programming within those hours. On February 28, 2022, subchannel 20.2 was upgraded to 720p high definition, mirroring low-power sister station, KSFV-CD 27.2 in Los Angeles, which also carried Heroes & Icons in HD.

==== Jewelry Television ====
On January 11, 2019, KVME-TV changed its affiliation from Heroes & Icons to Jewelry Television; the H&I affiliation was moved to the station's second digital subchannel.

In 2025, KVME-TV added MeTV Toons to its new 20.3 subchannel. On September 29, 2025, KVME-TV dropped the H&I feed from 20.2, and became a charter station for the WEST network. This change also happened on KVME's satellite feed and on its sister station KSFV-CD 27.2. H&I is now no longer available over the air in the Bishop area. It is still available in the Los Angeles area on KCOP-TV 13.4 and KAZA-TV 54.5.

== Technical information ==
=== Subchannels ===
The station's signal is multiplexed:

Subchannels of KVME-TV
Subchannel	Res.	Short name	Programming
20.1	480i	JEWELRY	Jewelry Television (4:3)
20.2	720p	WEST	WEST
20.3	720p	TOONS	MeTV Toons

=== Analog-to-digital transition ===
Because it was granted an original construction permit after the FCC finalized the DTV allotment plan on April 21, 1997, the station did not receive a companion channel for a digital television station. Instead, on or before June 12, 2009, which was the end of the digital TV conversion period for full-service stations, KVME-TV was required to turn off its analog signal and turn on its digital signal (called a "flash-cut"). On November 30, 2008, KVME completed the transition to digital by turning off its analog signal and immediately turning on its digital signal on channel 20.
