= WJSJ-CD =

Television station in Indianapolis

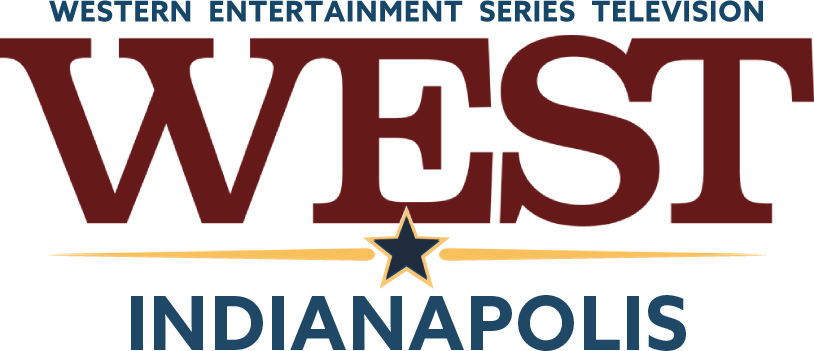
- Indianapolis, Indiana (Note: Originally licensed to Tipton, Indiana; moved to Indianapolis in 2025.); United States
- Channels: Digital: 14 (UHF); Virtual: 51
- Branding: WEST Indianapolis; Dabl Indianapolis (51.3)

Programming
- Affiliations: 51.1: WEST; for others, see § Subchannels

Ownership
- Owner: Weigel Broadcasting; (WJSJ-CD)

History
- Founded: October 26, 1990
- First air date: March 28, 1994
- Former call signs: W51BT (1990–1996); WIWU-LP (1996–2007); WIWU-CA (2007–2009); WIWU-CD (2009–2021)
- Former channel numbers: Analog: 51 (UHF, 1994–2009); Digital: 51 (UHF, 2009–2019), 28 (UHF, 2019–2025)
- Former affiliations: Independent/Religious (1990–2020); Paranormal TV (2020–2025); Dabl (2025, now on 51.3)

Technical information
- Licensing authority: FCC
- Facility ID: 29292
- Class: CD
- ERP: 15 kW
- HAAT: 291.3 m (956 ft)
- Transmitter coordinates: 39°53′39.2″N 86°12′20.5″W

Links
- Public license information: Public file; LMS

WJSJ-CD (channel 51) is a low-power, Class A television station in Indianapolis, Indiana, United States, airing programming from the Western-themed diginet WEST. The station is owned by Weigel Broadcasting.

== History ==
The station was formerly WIWU-CD, owned by Indiana Wesleyan University, until it was sold to Frank Copsidas in December 2020. Originally licensed to Tipton, Indiana, it aired local entertainment, sports, and news programming for Marion and Grant County, in addition to airing religious programming from TLN, Cornerstone Television and WHT. The sale came more than a year after Indiana Wesleyan University announced its intention to drop its broadcast operations and focus on digital services.

On January 16, 2025, it was announced that Weigel Broadcasting would acquire WJSJ-CD for $1.6 million; the sale was completed on March 24.

== Subchannels ==
The station's signal is multiplexed:

Subchannels of WJSJ-CD
Subchannel	Res.	Short name	Programming
51.1	720p	WEST	WEST
51.2	480i	START	Start TV
51.3	480i	DABL	Dabl
51.4	480i	HEROES	Heroes & Icons
51.5	480i	TOONS	MeTV Toons
51.12	480i	EMLW	OnTV4U (infomercials)
