= KHTV-CD =

Television station in Los Angeles

- Los Angeles, California; United States
- Channels: Digital: 22 (UHF), shared with KAZA-TV; Virtual: 6
- Branding: MeTV+ Los Angeles

Programming
- Affiliations: 6.1: MeTV+

Ownership
- Owner: Weigel Broadcasting; (KHTV-TV LLC)
- Sister stations: KAZA-TV, KVME-TV, KPOM-CD, KSFV-CD

History
- Founded: October 22, 1993
- Former call signs: K38EA (1993–2000); KHTV-LP (2000–February 2012); KHTV-LD (February−July 2012)
- Former channel numbers: Analog: 38 (UHF, 1993–2000), 48 (UHF, 2000–2001), 67 (UHF, 2001–2011); Digital: 27 (UHF, 2012–2019)
- Former affiliations: Spanish Religious (1993–1998); Spanish Independent (1998−2000); Home Shopping en Español (2000–2002); America's Store (2002–2004); HSN (2004–2012); Jewelry TV (2012−2022)
- Call sign meaning: Home Shopping Televisión, for its former affiliation with HSN's various networks

Technical information
- Licensing authority: FCC
- Facility ID: 60026
- Class: CD
- ERP: 15 kW
- HAAT: 872.2 m (2,862 ft)
- Transmitter coordinates: 34°12′47.9″N 118°3′44.3″W

Links
- Public license information: Public file; LMS

KHTV-CD (channel 6) is a low-power, Class A television station in Los Angeles, California, United States, airing programming from the digital multicast network MeTV+. It is owned by Weigel Broadcasting alongside MeTV station KAZA-TV (channel 54), Catchy Comedy outlet KPOM-CD (channel 14), and MeTV Toons affiliate KSFV-CD (channel 27). The stations share offices on Grand Central Avenue in Glendale; KAZA-TV's transmitter is located at the Mount Harvard Radio Site in the San Gabriel Mountains.

Due to its low-power status, KHTV-CD's broadcasting radius does not reach all of Greater Los Angeles. Therefore, it relies on cable and satellite carriage to reach the entire market.

== History ==
The station was founded on October 22, 1993. It signed on as K38EA on channel 38, before moving to channel 48 as KHTV-LP, starting in 2000 as an affiliate of now defunct Home Shopping en Español (the Spanish-language sister channel of HSN) until HSE ceased operations in June 2002. When KOCE launched its digital signal on channel 48 in 2001, this displaced KHTV-LP to channel 67. It stayed on channel 67 until December 31, 2011, when the last of the LPTV stations still using out-of-core channels 52-69 had to vacate that spectrum. In 2012, KHTV-LP converted to digital as KHTV-LD and moved to channel 27. On July 11, 2012, the station received class A status and changed its call sign to KHTV-CD. In 2019, as part of the repack, KHTV-CD moved to its current channel 22 allocation, channel sharing with MeTV owned-and-operated station KAZA-TV.

The KHTV call letters were originally used by an unrelated full-power station in Portland, Oregon, on channel 27, and in Houston on channel 39.

On February 28, 2022, KHTV-CD discontinued carrying Jewelry Television on 6.1 and replaced it with MeTV+. With this change, 6.1 was converted to 720p HD. All remaining subchannels carried by KHTV-CD were removed. MeTV Plus had been on KAZA-DT3 since its expansion to Weigel-owned stations in September 2021.

== Subchannels ==
Subchannels of KHTV-CD and KAZA-TV
License	Subchannel	Res.	Short name	Programming
KHTV-CD	6.1	720p	MeTV+	MeTV+
KAZA-TV	54.1	720p	MeTV	MeTV
KAZA-TV	54.2	480i	Story	Story Television
KAZA-TV	54.3	480i	Toons	MeTV Toons
KAZA-TV	54.4	480i	WEST	WEST
KAZA-TV	54.5	480i	H&I	Heroes & Icons
