= KAZA-TV =

Television station in Avalon, California

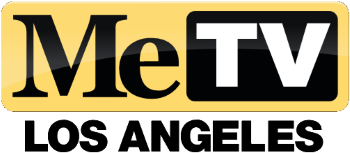
- Avalon–Los Angeles, California; United States
- City: Avalon, California
- Channels: Digital: 22 (UHF), shared with KHTV-CD; Virtual: 54
- Branding: MeTV Los Angeles

Programming
- Affiliations: 54.1: MeTV; for others, see § Subchannels

Ownership
- Owner: Weigel Broadcasting; (KAZA-TV LLC)
- Sister stations: KVME-TV, KHTV-CD, KPOM-CD, KSFV-CD

History
- First air date: July 9, 2001
- Former call signs: KBJO (1998); KIDN-TV (1998–2001)
- Former channel numbers: Analog: 54 (UHF, 2001–2009); Digital: 47 (UHF, 2004–2017), 27 (UHF, 2017–2019)
- Former affiliations: Spanish Independent (2001); Azteca América (2001–2018)
- Call sign meaning: Station was the former flagship of Azteca América

Technical information
- Licensing authority: FCC
- Facility ID: 29234
- ERP: 15 kW
- HAAT: 872.2 m (2,862 ft)
- Transmitter coordinates: 34°12′47.9″N 118°3′44.3″W

Links
- Public license information: Public file; LMS
- Website: KAZA page on MeTV website

KAZA-TV (channel 54) is a television station licensed to Avalon, California, United States, serving the Los Angeles area with programming from the classic television network MeTV. It is owned by Weigel Broadcasting alongside Bishop-licensed KVME-TV (channel 20) and low-power Class A MeTV+ station KHTV-CD (channel 6), Catchy Comedy outlet KPOM-CD (channel 14), and MeTV Toons affiliate KSFV-CD (channel 27). The stations share offices on Grand Central Avenue in Glendale; KAZA-TV's transmitter is located at the Mount Harvard Radio Site in the San Gabriel Mountains. KAZA-TV's MeTV feed is simulcast on the third digital subchannel of Anaheim-licensed KDOC-TV (channel 56), a Tri-State Christian Television (TCT) owned-and-operated station.

Even though KAZA-TV is licensed as a full-power station, its broadcasting radius does not reach all of Greater Los Angeles as it shares spectrum with KHTV-CD. Therefore, the station relies on cable and satellite carriage to reach the entire market.

== History ==
Former KAZA-TV logo from July 28, 2001, to July 11, 2011.

The station first signed on the air on July 9, 2001, originally operating as an independent station, carrying a format of Spanish-language music videos temporarily until the launch of Azteca América on July 28. The station was founded by Visalia-based Pappas Telecasting (which initially held a 75% majority stake in the station, which expanded to 80% in 2014) and TV Azteca (which owned the remaining interest).

On November 30, 2006, NBCUniversal (owner of rival KVEA, channel 52 and then-owner of KWHY, channel 22) filed a petition with the Federal Communications Commission (FCC) to deny KAZA's license renewal, on basis that TV Azteca controlled 51.6% of the station (above the FCC-designated 33% interest limit for foreign owned broadcasters) via loans and other interests. According to the Los Angeles Times, it is believed to be the first challenge to a license renewal sent to the FCC since 1979 (notwithstanding the two-decade long RKO General license challenges including KHJ-TV that were not fully sorted until the late 1980s).

According to the filing, NBC Universal accused TV Azteca of attempting to undermine its operations in Mexico. One example cited is the shutdown of production of the Telemundo program Quinceañera. NBC Universal accused TV Azteca of hiring undercover police officers to enforce the shutdown; the show's production was moved to Miami as a result. Two days later, Azteca chairman, Luis Echarte, insisted that the local marketing agreement is legitimate and called NBC Universal's allegations "ridiculous", citing that: "It's obviously a ploy to damage our image, given our strong performance in the U.S.," he says. "KAZA is owned by Pappas. We’ve been paying rent to Pappas to operate the station for three years."

Former station logo as an Azteca América affiliate from July 12, 2011, until January 3, 2018.

On September 8, 2017, Pappas Telecasting and TV Azteca announced they would sell KAZA to Chicago-based Weigel Broadcasting for $9 million. On January 1, 2018, KJLA (channel 57) replaced KAZA as the Azteca America affiliate for the Los Angeles market. Weigel Broadcasting assumed operational responsibilities for KAZA as well as ownership of its license on January 3, 2018, and converted into an owned-and-operated station of Weigel-owned MeTV as "MeTV Los Angeles". Prior to the switch, the MeTV affiliation was split between the DT3 feed of Anaheim-based KDOC-TV (channel 56) and Bishop-based KVME-TV (channel 20). KVME became an affiliate of MeTV's sister network, Heroes & Icons (H&I) on January 15, 2018, until 2020 when it moved H&I to its second digital subchannel and switched its primary affiliation to Jewelry Television.

On August 31, 2018, Decades soft-launched on KAZA-DT2, ahead of it moving three days later officially from KCBS-DT2 to launch fellow Weigel network Start TV.

On February 28, 2022, subchannel 54.2 was upgraded to 720p high definition. On May 26, 2022, Story Television moved to 54.2, with Decades moving to KPOM-CD 14.1.

== Technical information ==
=== Subchannels ===
Subchannels of KHTV-CD and KAZA-TV
License	Channel	Res.	Short name	Programming
KHTV-CD	6.1	720p	MeTV+	MeTV+
KAZA-TV	54.1	720p	MeTV	MeTV
KAZA-TV	54.2	480i	Story	Story Television
KAZA-TV	54.3	480i	Toons	MeTV Toons
KAZA-TV	54.4	480i	WEST	WEST
KAZA-TV	54.5	480i	H&I	Heroes & Icons

=== Analog-to-digital conversion ===
KAZA-TV shut down its analog signal, over UHF channel 54, on June 12, 2009, as part of the federally mandated transition from analog to digital television. The station's digital signal remained on its pre-transition UHF channel 47, using virtual channel 54.
