= KSFV-CD =

Television station in Los Angeles

- Los Angeles, California; United States
- Channels: Digital: 27 (UHF), shared with KPOM-CD; Virtual: 27

Programming
- Affiliations: 27.1: MeTV Toons; 27.2: WEST; 27.3: Jewelry TV

Ownership
- Owner: Weigel Broadcasting; (KSFV-TV LLC)
- Sister stations: KAZA-TV, KHTV-CD, KPOM-CD, KVME-TV

History
- Founded: April 13, 1989
- Former call signs: K24CM (1989–1995); KSFV-LP (1995–2009); KSFV-CA (2009–2013)
- Former channel number: Analog: 24 (UHF, 1989–2001), 26 (UHF, 2001–2004)
- Former affiliations: Spanish Independent (1995–2004); Almavision (2004–2015); HSN (2015–2019); Jewelry TV (2019–2024, now on 27.3)
- Call sign meaning: San Fernando Valley (original city of license)

Technical information
- Licensing authority: FCC
- Facility ID: 191101
- Class: CD
- ERP: 15 kW
- HAAT: 899.4 m (2,951 ft)
- Transmitter coordinates: 34°12′46.1″N 118°3′44.8″W
- Translator(s): KCAL-TV 9.6 Los Angeles (part-time)

Links
- Public license information: Public file; LMS

KSFV-CD (channel 27) is a low-power, Class A television station in Los Angeles, California, United States, airing programming from MeTV Toons, a digital multicast network dedicated to classic cartoons. The station is owned by Weigel Broadcasting, and transmits from the Mount Harvard Radio Site in the San Gabriel Mountains.

== History ==
The low-power station was founded in 1989 as translator K24CM on channel 24, before changing from a translator to an LPTV as KSFV-LP in 1995, moving to channel 26 in 2001. On April 30 of that year, the station debuted Spanish-language programming targeted towards Central American immigrants. Sometime after that, the station moved to channel 6 to make room for KVCR-DT in San Bernardino, which had signed on its digital signal on channel 26. Because of this move, the station began marketing itself as an FM radio station (carrying a Spanish Religious service known as Guadalupe Radio), since the audio of analog TV channel 6 can be heard at the bottom of the FM radio dial at 87.75 MHz. The station received Class A status in 2009, as KSFV-CA.

On March 9, 2009, Venture Technologies announced that it had signed a leasing agreement with Mega Media Group to launch a Dance format on KSFV, thus ending the Spanish Religious format on the signal. Programming was to have begun on June 1, 2009, and it would have been patterned after Mega Media's New York City outlet WNYZ-LP and likewise, carry the "Pulse 87" brand. However, Venture Technologies has notified Radio World that it would not take Mega Media's offer and Mega Media ceased operations in October 2009.

After converting KSFV to digital, Venture Technologies maintained the channel 6 analog service by acquiring KZNO-LP in Big Bear Lake and moving Guadalupe Radio to the latter. As of July 13, 2021, analog channel 6 has been shut off per FCC notice.

On June 25, 2024, KSFV-CD dropped Jewelry TV and became a MeTV Toons owned-and-operated station on its main channel, with the station adding a third subchannel and moving Jewelry TV there.

== Subchannels ==
The station's signal is multiplexed:

Subchannels of KPOM-CD and KSFV-CD
License	Subchannel]]	Res.	Short name	Programming
KPOM-CD	14.1	720p	KPOM	Catchy Comedy
KPOM-CD	14.12	480i	EMLW	OnTV4U (infomercials)
KSFV-CD	27.1	720p	TOONS	MeTV Toons
KSFV-CD	27.2	720p	WEST	WEST
KSFV-CD	27.3	480i	JEWELRY	Jewelry TV
