= WEST (TV network) =

American Western television network

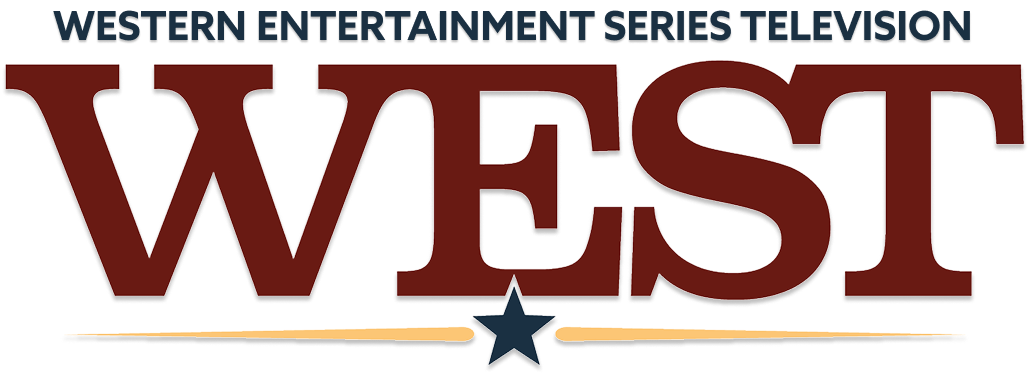
- Type: Broadcast television network (classic westerns)
- Country: United States
- Broadcast area: 51.21% OTA coverage and streaming
- Affiliates: see § Affiliates
- Headquarters: Chicago, Illinois

Programming
- Language: English
- Picture format: 720p HDTV master feed; 480i (SDTV widescreen) on most over-the-air affiliates)

Ownership
- Owner: Weigel Broadcasting
- Parent: Western Entertainment Series TV Limited Partnership
- Sister channels: MeTV; MeTV+; MeTV Toons; Movies!; Heroes & Icons; Catchy Comedy; Start TV; Story Television; Dabl

History
- Launched: September 29, 2025; 13 months ago

Links
- Website: westtelevision.com

Availability

Streaming media
- Service(s): Frndly TV, Philo

WEST (a backronym for Western Entertainment Series Television) is an American digital multicast television network owned by Weigel Broadcasting. The network airs a variety of classic western television series.

== History ==
On June 17, 2025, Weigel announced they would launch a new network dedicated solely to classic Western television series. Originally announced with a non-specific launch date within the fall of 2025, the launch date of September 29 was confirmed in the middle of that month.

The network was originally announced with Weigel stations as their preliminary base group for launch, with other affiliates solidified and announced in the week before September 29.

== Programming ==
This is the list of programs that airs on the network:

=== Weekdays ===
- Daniel Boone
- Maverick
- The Big Valley
- The Life and Legend of Wyatt Earp
- Lawman
- Have Gun, Will Travel
- The Virginian
- Laredo
- Gunsmoke
- Bonanza
- The Wild Wild West
- Rawhide
- Wanted: Dead or Alive
- Laramie
- The Restless Gun
- The Adventures of Jim Bowie
- The Californians
- Colt .45
- The Texan

=== Weekends ===
- Dr. Quinn, Medicine Woman
- The Waltons
- Wagon Train
- Cheyenne
- Bronco
- Sugarfoot
- Lancer
- The Guns of Will Sonnett
- Branded
- Broken Arrow
- Iron Horse
- Stagecoach West
- The High Chaparral
- Lonesome Dove: The Series
- The Men from Shiloh

=== E/I ===
- Mutual of Omaha's Wild Kingdom

=== Former ===
- Guns of Paradise (September 29 – December 15, 2025)

== Affiliates ==
At launch, WEST was available in 46 television markets across the country, including most major markets. The network was also available at launch through Dish (with internet service), along with TDS Telecom's IPTV service and Frndly TV, with some cable distribution in markets where Weigel stations are available or the group has national distribution and channel slots for their networks.

List of WEST affiliates
Media market	State/District	Station	Channel
Mobile	Alabama	WFBD	48.10
Montgomery	Alabama	WAKA	8.7
Kingman	Arizona	KMEE-TV	6.5
Phoenix	Arizona	KMEE-LD	40.5
Little Rock	Arkansas	KKME-LD	3.6
Bakersfield	California	KBFK-LP	34.7
Bishop	California	KVME-TV	20.2
Fresno	California	KGMC	43.9
Los Angeles	California	KSFV-CD	27.2
Los Angeles	California	KAZA-TV	54.4
San Francisco	California	KTLN-TV	68.7
Denver	Colorado	KREG-TV	3.9
Hartford–New Haven	Connecticut	WHCT-LD	35.10
Washington	District of Columbia	WDME-CD	48.7
Panama City Beach	Florida	WPCT	46.6
Jacksonville	Florida	WJKF-CD	9.2
Orlando	Florida	WRDQ	27.4
St. Petersburg–Tampa	Florida	WSPF-CD	35.5
Atlanta	Georgia	WSB-TV	2.4
Boise	Idaho	KKJB	39.5
Idaho Falls–Pocatello	Idaho	KPIF	15.4
Chicago	Illinois	WCIU-TV	26.8
Evansville	Indiana	WZDS-LD	5.7
Fort Wayne	Indiana	WINM	12.3
Fort Wayne	Indiana	WEIJ-LD	38.3
Indianapolis	Indiana	WJSJ-CD	51.1
South Bend	Indiana	WCWW-LD	25.6
Des Moines	Iowa	KDIT-CD	45.5
Louisville	Kentucky	WMYO-CD	24.4
Bay City–Flint	Michigan	WAQP	49.3
Detroit	Michigan	WJBK	2.4
Grand Rapids	Michigan	WTLJ	54.9
Kalamazoo	Michigan	WJGP-LD	26.9
Cape Girardeau	Missouri	WTCT	27.11
St. Louis	Missouri	KNLC	24.7
Ely	Nevada	KKEL	27.5
Las Vegas	Nevada	K10RX-D	9.3
Tonopah	Nevada	KBWT	9.3
Carlsbad	New Mexico	KKAC	19.7
Silver City	New Mexico	KKAD	10.7
Truth or Consequences	New Mexico	KKAB	12.1
Buffalo	New York	WNYB	26.9
New York City	New York	WJLP	33.4
Cleveland	Ohio	WOCV-CD	35.6
Oklahoma City	Oklahoma	KUOK-CD	36.5
Tulsa	Oklahoma	KUTU-CD	25.4
Astoria	Oregon	KPWT-LD	3.9
Pittsburgh	Pennsylvania	WOSC-CD	61.5
Nashville	Tennessee	WJFB	44.6
Memphis	Tennessee	WNBA-LD	2.3
Amarillo	Texas	KEYU	31.5
Dallas–Fort Worth	Texas	KAZD	55.1
Houston	Texas	KYAZ	51.5
St. George	Utah	KCSG	8.5
Norfolk	Virginia	WYSJ-CD	19.2
Seattle–Tacoma	Washington	KFFV	44.8
Green Bay	Wisconsin	WMEI	31.4
Milwaukee	Wisconsin	WYTU-LD	63.3
