= MeTV Toons =

American digital multicast television network

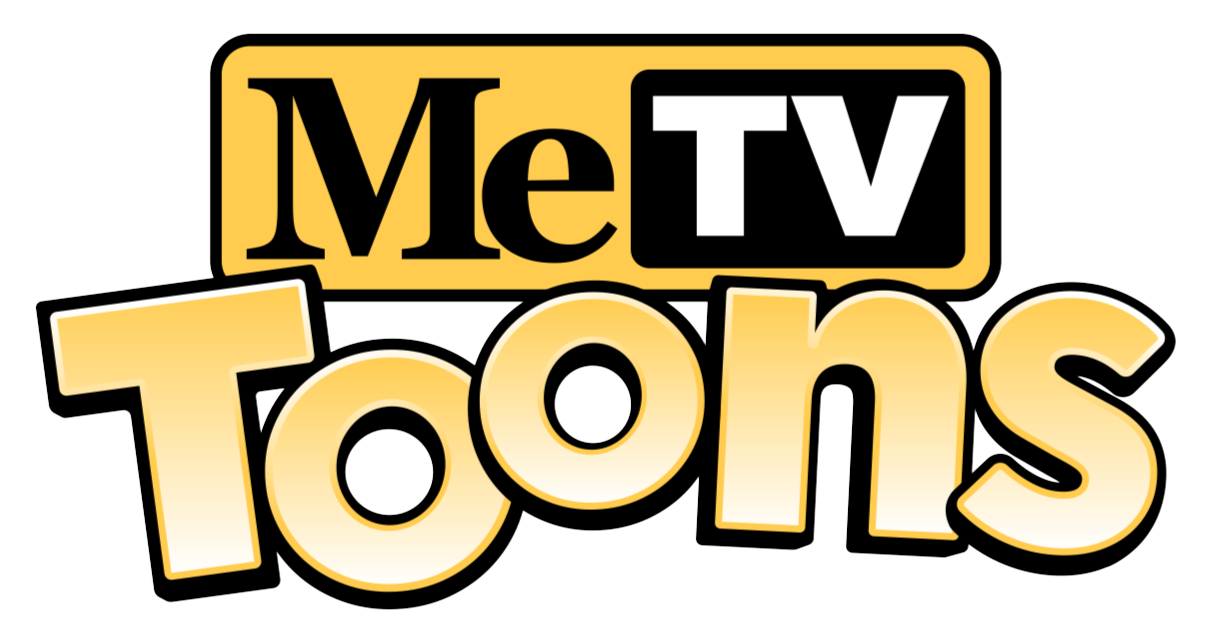
- Type: Broadcast television network (cartoons)
- Country: United States
- Broadcast area: Nationwide (77.23% OTA coverage)
- Headquarters: Chicago, Illinois

Programming
- Language: English
- Picture format: 720p HDTV master feed (downscaled to 480i SDTV widescreen on most OTA affiliates)

Ownership
- Owner: Weigel Broadcasting
- Parent: WAM TV Limited Partnership
- Sister channels: Catchy Comedy; Dabl; H&I; MeTV; MeTV+; Movies!; Start TV; Story Television; WEST

History
- Launched: June 25, 2024; 2 years ago

Links
- Website: metvtoons.com

Availability

Terrestrial
- See list of affiliates

Streaming media
- Service(s): DirecTV Stream, Frndly TV, FuboTV, Philo

MeTV Toons is an American broadcast television network owned and operated by Weigel Broadcasting that launched on June 25, 2024, as a spin-off of MeTV. It primarily airs classic animated television series.

The network's programming mainly consists of classic animated content owned by Skydance (Warner Bros., Hanna-Barbera, Ruby-Spears, Turner Entertainment Co., Fleischer Studios, Famous Studios, and Terrytoons libraries), NBCUniversal (DreamWorks Classics (Total Television, Jay Ward Productions, Filmation, and United Productions of America), and Walter Lantz Productions libraries), Sony Pictures Entertainment (Screen Gems and United Productions of America libraries), and WildBrain (Cookie Jar Group, DIC Entertainment, and Jay Ward Productions libraries) dating from the 1930s to the 2010s.

== History ==
Trademark registrations for MeTV Toons were first filed in March 2023, with originally considered names for the network being "Toon TV" or "Toony TV" (a name likely inspired by the mascot of the MeTV original program Toon In with Me, Toony the Tuna), as well as names of interstitials for the network such as 'Cartoon College' filed in December 2023.

On May 1, 2024, Variety and TVLine reported Weigel was partnering with Warner Bros. Discovery on MeTV Toons, which was billed as a 24/7, free-to-air television network dedicated to broadcasting classic animated programming. TheDesk.net reported that Weigel was also working with Paramount Pictures, Amazon MGM Studios (The Pink Panther), Universal Pictures and a number of other content studios.

The following day, Weigel officially announced the launch of the channel, which would take place on June 25. The channel launched with a marathon of the pilot episodes of all of its non-compilation shows, with the inaugural program at 6am Eastern/5am Central time being Captain Planet and the Planeteers. The channel follows a similar format to the formative years of WBD's Cartoon Network and Boomerang.

Officials at Weigel announced ahead of the launch that they had planned to distribute MeTV Toons in three formats: as a broadcast channel available in many cities via over-the-air television and cable, as a streaming channel offered through subscription-based services, and as a 'complementary offering' for ad-supported streaming platforms.

Broadcast affiliates include those owned by Weigel itself, as well as those operated by Cox Media Group, Bahakel Communications, Hubbard Broadcasting, Allen Media Group, and Gray Television. Frndly TV and Philo, two over-the-top MVPD services that carry all of Weigel's other networks, added the network on launch day. On June 26, 2025, the network was added to FuboTV.

On June 18, 2025, it was announced that MeTV Toons would become available on DirecTV on both their satellite and streaming service. The channel was added on June 30, and was also added to Dish Network on October 23 and Xfinity on December 9.

== Programming ==
MeTV Toons' lineup includes programs that have aired on MeTV in the morning hours (such as Looney Tunes, Merrie Melodies, Tom and Jerry, Popeye, and Woody Woodpecker) and prime-time (The Flintstones and The Jetsons). The network has also aired shows not seen on MeTV (such as Scooby-Doo, Yogi Bear, Huckleberry Hound, Wally Gator, Teenage Mutant Ninja Turtles, Magilla Gorilla, Peter Potamus, and Casper the Friendly Ghost), including classic anime titles (such as Speed Racer and Marine Boy) and various UK-produced Supermarionation programs (such as Thunderbirds, Supercar, Stingray, Fireball XL5, and Captain Scarlet and the Mysterons).

The network runs original interstitial series which animation historian Jerry Beck helped produce. Bob Bergen, the current voice actor for Porky Pig, is the promotional announcer for the network.

In order to meet E/I regulations and guidelines, MeTV Toons airs edutainment cartoons such as Captain Planet and the Planeteers, Baby Looney Tunes, and Histeria!.

=== Blocks ===
- Cartoon All-Stars: An hour block airing Monday through Saturday at 10:00 p.m. ET, featuring theatrical shorts from across the Universal (Walter Lantz), Paramount (Fleischer, Famous, and Harvey), Warner Bros. (Warner Bros. Cartoons), Columbia (Screen Gems and United Productions of America), Metro-Goldwyn-Mayer (MGM Cartoon Studio), and 20th Century Fox (Terrytoons) libraries.
- Sunday Night Cartoon All-Stars: An extended three-hour block airing Sundays from 8:00 p.m. to 11:00 p.m. ET, a successor to the Sunday Night Cartoons block on sister station MeTV+.
- House of Hanna-Barbera: A two-hour, late morning and early afternoon block, airing weekdays from 11:00 a.m. to 1:00 p.m. ET, and Sundays from 1:00 p.m. to 3:00 p.m. ET. The block showcases a variety of classic Hanna-Barbera animated shorts from the late 1950s to the mid 1960s, including the likes of Yogi Bear, Huckleberry Hound, Wally Gator, Secret Squirrel and Snagglepuss.
- Totally Animated 80s: A late night block airing late Saturdays from 1:30 a.m. to 6:00 a.m. ET, featuring action and comedy animation from the 1980s. Initial programs include Police Academy: The Animated Series, The Real Ghostbusters, SilverHawks, Pac-Man, The Plastic Man Comedy/Adventure Show, Challenge of the GoBots, The Completely Mental Misadventures of Ed Grimley, and Mister T.
- Cartoon Carousel: An hour-long block airing weekdays at 10:00 a.m. ET, showcasing a different cartoon series every week, mainly ones that are short-lived that wouldn't be aired on a daily basis, featuring initially announced programs like Captain Caveman and the Teen Angels, Butch Cassidy and the Sundance Kids, Clue Club, The Funky Phantom, Goober and the Ghost Chasers, Buford and the Galloping Ghost, Droopy, Master Detective, Dynomutt, Dog Wonder and The Roman Holidays.
- Animation Antiques: A late-night block airing Sundays at 1:30 a.m. ET, showing rarely seen theatrical cartoon series such as The Captain and the Kids, Koko the Clown, Little Lulu, Swifty and Shorty, Cubby Bear, and Tom and Jerry, along with familiar cartoon series like Popeye and Betty Boop.
- Situation Animation: A late-night 2-hour block airing Sundays from 11:00 p.m. to 1:00 a.m. ET, featuring cartoons based on live action sitcoms. Initial programs include The Fonz and the Happy Days Gang, The New Adventures of Gilligan, Jeannie and The Addams Family. The initial lineup also included Linus the Lionhearted; however, it is likely as a timeslot filler for a yet-to-be-added series, as the show is otherwise not mentioned in the block advertisements nor otherwise carries any tonal consistency with the fellow shows, being focused on cereal mascots.

==== Former blocks ====
- Known Strings Attached: A former late night block airing weeknights from 4:00 a.m. to 5:30 a.m. ET, featuring Supermarionation programs from Gerry and Sylvia Anderson, with the channel frequently cycling through the different series including: Thunderbirds, Supercar, Fireball XL5, Stingray, Captain Scarlet and the Mysterons and Joe 90.
- Flintstones Family Sunday: A former afternoon block airing Sundays from 4:00 p.m. to 5:00 p.m. ET, featuring various films and spin-off series from The Flintstones franchise, that launched with The Jetsons Meet the Flintstones and The Man Called Flintstone.
- Scooby-Doo! Sunday Specials: A former afternoon block airing Sundays from 3:00 p.m. to 4:00 p.m. ET, featuring various films and spin-off series from the Scooby-Doo franchise, that launched with a run of The New Scooby-Doo Movies.

=== Holiday special blocks ===
- Spooktacular Sundays: This Halloween-themed block that first introduced in October 2024 ran on Sundays from 1:00 p.m. to 5:00 p.m. EST (though sometimes continued until later in the evening). In October 2025, the block ran on Sundays from 3:00 p.m. to 8:00 p.m. EST. In addition, this would be the first instance of characters from Svengoolie appearing on the channel, often seen doing hosted segments. Some of the cartoons featured on the block included The Frankenstones (a segment on The Flintstone Comedy Show as well as various Scooby-Doo specials and episodes (e.g. Scooby-Doo and the Ghoul School and Scooby-Doo! and the Reluctant Werewolf). The block also introduced other various specials like Monster in My Pocket: The Big Scream, The Halloween Tree, Yogi and the Invasion of the Space Bears and Casper's Halloween Special, alongside other episodes of various shows like The Funky Phantom, Goober and the Ghost Chasers, Beetlejuice, The Addams Family and Fangface.
- ’Tis the Season for Toons: A Christmas-themed block that introduced in November 2024, presenting Christmas-themed specials of classic cartoons on Saturdays from 4:00 p.m. to 8:00 p.m. EST. Such specials include Christmas and snow-themed episodes of Looney Tunes, The Smurfs, and Rocky & Bullwinkle to name a few. This block also airs a large number of Christmas specials. Examples include the likes of Inspector Gadget Saves Christmas, Sonic Christmas Blast, Yogi's First Christmas and Caillou's Holiday Movie. It also includes non-Christmas specials that were featured on the block like Dr. Seuss/DFE animated specials such as The Cat in the Hat, The Lorax, Dr. Seuss on the Loose and The Hoober-Bloob Highway.
- Rabbits, Ducks and No Turkeys!: A 15-hour marathon of theatrical Looney Tunes and Merrie Melodies cartoons, headlined by Bugs Bunny and Daffy Duck, throughout Thanksgiving Day from 8:00 a.m. to 11:30 p.m. EST. The animated short block was introduced on Thanksgiving Day in 2024.
- Black (and White) Friday: Similar to Rabbits, Ducks and No Turkeys! (as seen above), this was also a 15-hour marathon of theatrical cartoons, this time focusing on Popeye, Betty Boop and black-and-white Looney Tunes and Merrie Melodies shorts (from 1931 to 1943), premiered the day after the Rabbits, Ducks and No Turkeys! marathon, Black Friday, from 8:00a.m. to 11:30p.m. EST.
- Easter Eggstravaganza: An Easter block which aired on Easter Sunday in April 2025, from 4:00p.m. to 11:00p.m. EST, featuring 3 Easter specials: Baby Looney Tunes' Eggs-traordinary Adventure, The Smurfs Springtime Special, and Yogi the Easter Bear. Other Easter-themed cartoons that also aired on the block include the 1947 Looney Tunes short Easter Yeggs, the 1943 Oswald the Lucky Rabbit short The Egg Cracker Suite and the 1957 Tom and Jerry short Happy Go Ducky, alongside further Easter-related shorts on the Sunday Night Cartoon All-Stars block. The block returned on Easter Sunday in April 2026, adding the Rankin-Bass specials The First Easter Rabbit and The Easter Bunny Is Comin' to Town.

== Affiliates ==
The network is available on the following OTA stations as well as the paid streaming services Frndly TV and Philo.

Current affiliates for MeTV Toons
Media market	State/district	Station	Channel
Hoover–Birmingham	Alabama	WPXH-TV	44.4
Huntsville–Decatur	Alabama	WAAY-TV	31.8
Mobile	Alabama	WMBP-LD	31.4
Tuskegee–Montgomery	Alabama	WBMM	22.3
Kingman	Arizona	KMEE-TV	6.4
Phoenix	Arizona	KMEE-LD	40.4
Tucson	Arizona	KVOA	4.4
Little Rock	Arkansas	KKME-LD	3.2
Avalon	California	KAZA-TV	54.3
Bishop–Mammoth Lakes	California	KVME-TV	20.3
Chico–Redding	California	KHSL-TV	12.9
Fresno	California	KGMC	43.5
Los Angeles	California	KSFV-CD	27.1
Monterey	California	KMBY-LD	27.5
Palo Alto–San Francisco–Oakland–San Jose	California	KTLN-TV	68.6
Sacramento–Stockton–Modesto	California	KMAX-TV	31.6
Glenwood Springs–Denver	Colorado	KREG-TV	3.8
Bridgeport	Connecticut	WZME	43.4
Hartford–New Haven	Connecticut	WHCT-LD	35.8
Washington	District of Columbia	WDME-CD	48.5
Fort Myers–Cape Coral–Naples	Florida	WBBH-TV	20.4
Gainesville	Florida	WTGB-LD	34.2
Jacksonville	Florida	WJAX-TV	47.4
Miami–Fort Lauderdale	Florida	WBFS-TV	33.7
Orlando	Florida	WFTV	9.4
Panama City	Florida	WPFN-CD	22.5
Tampa–St. Petersburg	Florida	WTOG	44.6
West Palm Beach	Florida	WBWP-LD	19.8
Macon	Georgia	WPGA-LD	50.5
Norcross–Atlanta	Georgia	WKTB-CD	47.7
Savannah–Baxley	Georgia	WSCG	34.6
Valdosta–Albany–Moultrie–Tifton	Georgia	WSWG	44.4
Honolulu	Hawaii	KIKU	20.2
Boise	Idaho	KNIN-TV	9.4
Idaho Falls	Idaho	KPIF	15.5
Twin Falls	Idaho	KYTL-LD	17.5
Bloomington	Illinois	WYZZ	43.2
Chicago	Illinois	WCIU-TV	26.7
Rockford	Illinois	WREX	13.2
Evansville	Indiana	WZDS-LD	5.6
Indianapolis	Indiana	WJSJ-CD	51.2
South Bend	Indiana	WCWW-LD	25.3
Terre Haute	Indiana	WTHI-TV	10.5
Des Moines	Iowa	KDIT-CD	45.4
Waterloo	Iowa	KWWL	7.6
Bowling Green	Kentucky	WNKY-LD	35.4
Lexington	Kentucky	WTVQ-DT	36.4
Louisville	Kentucky	WBNA	21.7
Paducah	Kentucky	WQWQ-LD	9.4
Monroe	Louisiana	KMLU	11.8
Lafayette	Louisiana	KADN-TV	15.5
New Orleans	Louisiana	KNOV-CD	41.6
Portland	Maine	WMTW	8.6
Baltimore	Maryland	WMJF-CD	39.1
Salisbury	Maryland	WGDV-LD	32.4
Boston	Massachusetts	WMFP	62.3
Cadillac	Michigan	W15DF-D	15.6
Charles	Michigan	W28EJ-D	28.6
Detroit	Michigan	WKBD-TV	50.7
Elmhurst	Michigan	W27DQ-D	27.6
Flint–Saginaw–Bay City–Midland	Michigan	WJRT-TV	12.7
Kalamazoo–Battle Creek–Grand Rapids	Michigan	WLLA	64.7
Traverse City	Michigan	W16DN-D	16.6
Vanderbilt	Michigan	W20DT-D	20.6
Duluth	Minnesota	KCWV	27.9
Minneapolis	Minnesota	KSTC-TV	5.6
Rochester	Minnesota	KTTC	10.7
Greenwood	Mississippi	WMEL-LD	13.4
Tupelo	Mississippi	WLOV-TV	27.5
Jackson	Mississippi	WLOO	35.5
Kansas City	Missouri	KGKC-LD	39.7
St. Louis	Missouri	KNLC	24.2
Carlsbad	New Mexico	KKAC	19.5
Silver City	New Mexico	KKAD	10.5
Truth or Consequences-Albuquerque	New Mexico	KKAB	12.5
Buffalo	New York	WNYB	26.3
New York City	New York	WJLP	33.2
Plattsburgh	New York	WYCI	40.7
Rochester	New York	WBGT-CD	46.6
Syracuse	New York	WMJQ-CD	40.3
Ely	Nevada	KKEL	27.8
Tonopah-Las Vegas	Nevada	KBWT	9.5
Charlotte	North Carolina	WCCB	18.9
Cleveland	Ohio	WOCV-CD	35.3
Columbus	Ohio	WCBZ-CD	22.4
Dayton	Ohio	WHIO-TV	7.4
Oklahoma City	Oklahoma	KTUZ-TV	30.7
Tulsa	Oklahoma	KMYT-TV	41.5
Eugene	Oregon	KEZI	9.6
Portland	Oregon	KJYY-LD	29.8
Salem	Oregon	KJWY-LD	21.8
Johnstown	Pennsylvania	WTOO-CD	50.6
Philadelphia	Pennsylvania	WDPN-TV	2.10
Pittsburgh	Pennsylvania	WOSC-CD	61.1
Columbia	South Carolina	WOLO-TV	25.9
Honea Path	South Carolina	WWYA-LD	28.2
Myrtle Beach–Florence	South Carolina	WFXB	43.9
Sioux Falls	South Dakota	KSFY-TV	13.6
Jackson	Tennessee	WBBJ-TV	7.5
Memphis	Tennessee	WNBA-LD	2.4
Nashville–Lebanon	Tennessee	WJFB	44.8
Belton–Killeen–Temple–Waco	Texas	KNCT	46.7
Austin	Texas	KADF-LD	20.9
Corpus Christi	Texas	KQSY-LD	30.5
Dallas–Fort Worth	Texas	KAZD	55.3
Houston	Texas	KPRC-TV	51.6
Lubbock	Texas	KMYL-LD	14.5
San Antonio–Fredericksburg	Texas	KCWX	2.5
Weslaco–McAllen–Harlingen–Brownsville	Texas	KRGV-TV	5.4
Cedar City–St. George–Ogden–Salt Lake City	Utah	KCSG/KCSG-LD	8.8
Chesapeake–Norfolk–Virginia Beach	Virginia	WSKY-TV	4.6
Richmond	Virginia	WWBK-LD	28.1
Bellingham	Washington	KVOS-TV	12.9
Seattle–Tacoma	Washington	KFFV	44.7
Parkersburg	West Virginia	WIYE-LD	26.3
Crandon	Wisconsin	WMOW	4.3
Eau Claire	Wisconsin	WQOW	18.3
La Crosse	Wisconsin	WXOW	19.3
Madison	Wisconsin	WKOW	27.3
Racine–Milwaukee	Wisconsin	WMLW-TV	49.5
Shawano–Green Bay–Fox Cities	Wisconsin	WMEI	31.2
Wausau	Wisconsin	WAOW	9.3

== See also ==
- Golden age of American animation
