= Jewelry Television =

American television network

- Headquarters: Knoxville, Tennessee, U.S.

Programming
- Picture format: 1080i (HDTV); 480i (SDTV)

Ownership
- Owner: Multimedia Commerce Group, Inc.

History
- Launched: October 15, 1993; 32 years ago
- Former names: America's Collectibles Network (1993-2002)

Links
- Website: www.jtv.com

Availability

Terrestrial
- Available on some television stations/leased access cable channels full-time or overnights: Check local listings

Streaming media
- Live Stream: Watch live
- Digital media receiver: Roku, Apple TV, Fire TV

Jewelry Television is an American television network specializing in the sale of jewelry. On-air and online, the network is mainly branded by its jtv initials in lower-case letters. It has an estimated reach of more than 80 million U.S. households, through cable and satellite providers, online streaming and limited over-the-air broadcasters.

The headquarters of Jewelry Television are located in Knoxville, Tennessee. It has manufacturing facilities in Sri Lanka, Hong Kong, and Thailand.

== History ==
Jewelry Television was founded as America's Collectibles Network (ACN) in 1993 by Jerry Sisk Jr., Bob Hall, and Bill Kouns. Sisk was a graduate gemologist, Kouns was a jewelry expert, and Hall had existing television industry experience.

The fledgling network began broadcasting from a studio in Greeneville, Tennessee, with just one television camera. ACN initially sold gemstones, jewelry, and collectible coins. Sisk, Hall, and Kouns later moved the network to a larger headquarters and television studio in Knoxville.

In 2002, the company re-launched as Jewelry Television and has since focused on selling gemstones, jewelry and jewelry-making kits.

In 2006, Jewelry Television bought competitor Shop at Home and its assets from Scripps. It then served as the replacement for the latter network on a group of Shop at Home-specific Scripps-owned stations while it looked to sell them off.

In 2008 and 2009, Jewelry Television experienced multiple rounds of layoffs, due to both precious metal price increases and the Great Recession. Jewelry Television has approximately 1,400 employees, as of May 2019.

The network added permanent coverage through the subchannels of Ion Television on March 27, 2023, coincidentally returning the network to the station group which brought it further coverage with the wind-down of its competitor. Scripps wound down the operations of the reality television network TrueReal (which merged with fellow OTA sister network Defy TV) and began to carry JTV under the common arrangement where Scripps will be paid for any sales made through their Ion carriage, with Scripps also carrying the network in markets where no Ion station is available but they do own a traditional television station.

On December 5, 2024, Scripps abruptly removed JTV from all of its stations, replacing it in some markets with getTV.

=== Canadian expansion ===
On September 7, 2022, Jewelry Television announced that the network would officially pursue further Canadian pay-TV carriage and facilitate easier shipping into the country from the United States, after years of streaming grey market coverage.

== Overview ==
Jewelry Television airs 24 hours a day, although programming hours vary between each region, based on the local TV provider. In October 2008 the network began broadcasting in high definition. The network also streams online through its website, like most home shopping networks.

In April 2012, Jewelry Television launched the Titanic Jewelry Collection. Created in partnership with Titanic Museum Attractions, this proprietary collection offers pieces in the Art Nouveau and Edwardian styles typical of that era.

== Lawsuits ==
On March 26, 2008, Jewelry Television filed suit in the U.S. District Court in Tennessee against Lloyd's of London, as a result of a criminal scheme that took place in 2006 and 2007. A person had used a bank account of the Office of the Comptroller of the City of New York to buy more than $3.5 million in jewelry.

On May 23, 2008, a $5 million class action lawsuit was filed in California against Jewelry Television. The suit alleged that since 2003, the shopping network has sold a gemstone called andesine-labradorite, without disclosing its treatment, while promising buyers that this stone was rare and untreated. On June 2, 2008, Jewelry Television said andesine-labradorite has been sold in the gem trade since 2002 as a natural and untreated material. "Lab reports from major laboratories have consistently confirmed these gemstones as natural and untreated. Jewelry Television, like other major retailers, relied upon the lab reports and general industry information".

On May 19, 2009, an age discrimination lawsuit was filed against Jewelry Television alleging an employee had been terminated as part of a company-wide reduction in workforce the previous May.

== See also ==
- Art jewelry
- Jewellery
