= Rex Sorensen =

American businessman (1943–2019)

Rex Sorensen (1943 – March 10, 2019) was the chairman and CEO of Sorensen Media Group. He was a founding board member of Air America Radio.

== Biography ==
Sorensen was a graduate of the University of Oregon and was a Certified Public Accountant. Sorensen started his career in Hawaii as a real estate developer. Sorensen then became a media investor and broadcaster in the Pacific. Sorensen was the CEO of Sorensen Media Group, a privately held media and entertainment conglomerate, and the largest broadcast company in the Western Pacific with holdings in television, radio and Internet programming, development, production and broadcasting.

Sorensen died on March 10, 2019, at the age of 73.

=== Sorensen Media Group ===
==== Radio ====
Sorensen began his media broadcasting career in Guam, USA, with News Talk K57, which he began as a music-oriented station in November 1981 and converted to a news talk format in 1985. Subsequent station launches include Northern Mariana Islands contemporary hit station Power 99 in 1992, Guam rhythmic contemporary music station Power 98 in 1993, Northern Marianas rock station The Rock and Guam oldies station The Kat.

==== Television ====
Sorensen Media Group moved into television after radio with the launch of Guam station KEQI-LP in 2004. The station became a Fox affiliate September 1, 2005. Guam ABC affiliate KTGM was acquired by Sorensen in November 2005. Sorensen Media Group also operates another ABC affiliate, KPPI-LP (a repeater of KTGM) at Garapan on Saipan.

=== Air America ===
Sorensen was a founding board member of Air America Radio as the chairman of Progress Media, the parent company of Air America. However, he resigned from Air America's board in May 2004.

== Awards ==
- 2007: named “Media Mogul” by GU magazine
