= Channel 22 =

Channel 22 may refer to:

- XEIMT-TDT, aka Canal 22, a Mexican cultural and educational television station
- Mix 22, a channel on XM Satellite Radio
- Televisão de Espinho, a defunct pirate television station in Espinho, Portugal
- Education 22, one of the former names of TVM+, a Maltese television channel

== Canada ==
The following television stations operate on virtual channel 22 in Canada:

- CIII-DT-22 in Stevenson, Ontario
- CIVB-DT in Rimouski, Quebec

== See also ==
- Chanel No. 22, a perfume
- "Twenty Two" (The Twilight Zone), an episode of the American television series The Twilight Zone
- Channel 22 virtual TV stations in the United States

For UHF frequencies covering 518-524 MHz

- Channel 22 TV stations in Canada
- Channel 22 TV stations in Mexico
- Channel 22 digital TV stations in the United States
- Channel 22 low-power TV stations in the United States
