= Channel 22 low-power TV stations in the United States =

The following low-power television stations broadcast on digital or analog channel 22 in the United States:

- K22AD-D in Gillette, Wyoming
- K22BR-D in May, etc., Oklahoma
- K22CI-D in Lander, Wyoming
- K22CQ-D in Idalia, Colorado
- K22CU-D in Cortez, etc., Colorado
- K22DM-D in Rural Summit County, Utah
- K22DR-D in Laughlin, Nevada
- K22DV-D in Alexandria, Minnesota
- K22EW-D in Mora, New Mexico
- K22FH-D in Hawthorne, Nevada
- K22FN-D in White Oaks, etc., New Mexico
- K22FS-D in Beaver, etc., Utah
- K22FW-D in Mount Pleasant, Utah
- K22GE-D in Dulce, New Mexico
- K22GM-D in Battle Mountain, Nevada
- K22GW-D in Wells, Nevada
- K22GX-D in Tri City, Oregon
- K22HO-D in Cottage Grove, Oregon
- K22ID-D in Alva - Cherokee, Oklahoma
- K22IE-D in Navajo Mtn. Sch., etc., Utah
- K22IF-D in Oljeto, Utah
- K22IG-D in Mexican Hat, Utah
- K22IK-D in Rexburg, etc., Idaho
- K22IL-D in Prineville, etc., Oregon
- K22IM-D in Challis, Idaho
- K22IP-D in Virgin, Utah
- K22IQ-D in Cave Junction, Oregon
- K22IX-D in Mayfield, Utah
- K22IY-D in Big Piney, Wyoming
- K22JA-D in Corpus Christi, Texas
- K22JC-D in Silver Springs, Nevada
- K22JF-D in Stemilt, etc., Washington
- K22JG-D in Green River, Utah
- K22JI-D in Huntington, Utah
- K22JM-D in Gunnison, Colorado
- K22JN-D in Grand Junction, Colorado
- K22JR-D in Turkey, Texas
- K22JS-D in Ashland, Oregon
- K22JY-D in Truth or Consequences, New Mexico
- K22JZ-D in Spring Glen, Utah
- K22KB-D in Ely, etc., Nevada
- K22KC-D in The Dalles, Oregon
- K22KD-D in Sioux Falls, South Dakota
- K22KS-D in Libby, Montana
- K22KU-D in Redwood Falls, Minnesota
- K22KW-D in Julesburg, Colorado
- K22KY-D in Poplar, Montana
- K22LD-D in Chinook, Montana
- K22LE-D in Cedarville, California
- K22LJ-D in Mason City, Iowa
- K22LR-D in Collbran, Colorado
- K22LW-D in Orderville, Utah
- K22LY-D in Baker Valley, Oregon
- K22LZ-D in Hollis, Oklahoma
- K22MA-D in Elk City, Oklahoma
- K22MB-D in Roseburg, Oregon
- K22MD-D in Anderson/Central Valley, California
- K22ME-D in Deming, New Mexico
- K22MF-D in Red Lake, Minnesota
- K22MG-D in Woods Bay, Montana
- K22MH-D in Logan, Utah
- K22MI-D in Drummond, Montana
- K22MJ-D in Hinsdale, Montana
- K22MM-D in Garfield County, Utah
- K22MN-D in Fort Peck, Montana
- K22MO-D in Pateros, Washington
- K22MP-D in Richfield, etc., Utah
- K22MQ-D in St. James, Minnesota
- K22MR-D in Virginia, Minnesota
- K22MS-D in Eagles Nest, New Mexico
- K22MT-D in Idabel, Oklahoma
- K22MU-D in Circleville, Utah
- K22MV-D in Teasdale, Utah
- K22MW-D in Panguitch, Utah
- K22MX-D in Henrieville, Utah
- K22MY-D in Jackson, Minnesota
- K22MZ-D in International Falls, Minnesota
- K22NA-D in Inyokern, etc., California
- K22NB-D in Kanarraville etc., Utah
- K22NC-D in Scipio/Holden, Utah
- K22ND-D in Willmar, Minnesota
- K22NE-D in Myton, Utah
- K22NF-D in Orangeville, Utah
- K22NG-D in Eureka, Nevada
- K22NI-D in Leesville, Louisiana
- K22NJ-D in Lucerne, Wyoming
- K22NK-D in Lake Havasu City, Arizona
- K22NM-D in Las Cruces, New Mexico
- K22NN-D in Forsyth, Montana
- K22NO-D in Tulia, Texas
- K22NP-D in Shiprock, New Mexico
- K22NQ-D in Holbrook, Idaho
- K22NR-D in Stephenville, Texas
- K22NT-D in Aztec, New Mexico
- K22NU-D in Golconda, Nevada
- K22NV-D in Malad City, Idaho
- K22NW-D in Boulder, Colorado
- K22NX-D in Juliaetta, Idaho
- K22OB-D in Medford, Oregon
- K22OC-D in Fort Smith, Arkansas
- K22OG-D in Fargo, North Dakota
- K22OH-D in Helena, Montana
- K22OI-D in Carbondale, Colorado
- K22OK-D in Waco, Texas
- K22OO-D in Nephi, Utah
- K22OP-D in Santa Barbara, California
- K22OQ-D in Fort Jones, etc., California
- K22OV-D in Caputa, South Dakota
- K22OW-D in Alexandria, Louisiana
- KAXT-CD in San Francisco-San Jose, California
- KCPQ (DRT) in Tacoma, Washington
- KDCG-CD in Opelousas, Louisiana
- KEQI-LD in Dededo, Guam
- KFXF-LD in Fairbanks, Alaska
- KGSW-LD in Keene, Texas
- KHPN-LD in Warrenton, Oregon
- KHTV-CD in Los Angeles, California
- KISA-LD in San Antonio, Texas
- KJHP-LD in Morongo Valley, California
- KJNE-LD in Jonesboro, Arkansas
- KLEW-TV in Moscow, Idaho
- KLFB-LD in Salinas, California
- KLKW-LD in Amarillo, Texas
- KMDF-LD in Midland, Texas
- KMJC-LD in Kansas City, Kansas
- KMYL-LD in Lubbock, Texas
- KNAV-LD in Dallas, Texas
- KPDF-CD in Phoenix, Arizona
- KPDR-LD in Salt Lake City, Utah
- KPSN-LD in Payson, Arizona
- KRID-LD in Boise, Idaho
- KTLM in Harlingen/Rio Grande City, Texas
- KTOU-LD in Oklahoma City, Oklahoma
- KTXE-LD in San Angelo, Texas
- KUMY-LD in Beaumont, Texas
- KUWB-LD in Bloomington, Utah
- KWBJ-CD in Morgan City, Louisiana
- KWBJ-LD in Morgan City, Louisiana
- KXLY-TV in Spokane, Washington
- KYES-LD in Anchorage, Alaska
- KZHD-LD in Rohnert Park, California
- KZVU-LD in Chico, California
- W22CV-D in Moorefield, West Virginia
- W22CY-D in Clarksburg, West Virginia
- W22DO-D in Utica, New York
- W22EL-D in Vanderbilt, Michigan
- W22EN-D in Manteo, North Carolina
- W22EP-D in Starkville, Mississippi
- W22EX-D in Staunton, Virginia
- W22FA-D in Mayaguez, Puerto Rico
- W22FB-D in Marion, North Carolina
- W22FC-D in Greenville, North Carolina
- W22FH-D in Fort Wayne, Indiana
- W22FI-D in Key West, Florida
- W22FK-D in Baraboo, Wisconsin
- W22FN-D in Wilmington, North Carolina
- W41BQ in Asheville, North Carolina
- WARP-CD in Tampa-St. Petersburg, Florida
- WBLZ-LD in Syracuse, New York
- WBOC-LD in Cambridge, Maryland
- WCBS-TV (DRT) in Riverhead, New York
- WCKV-LD in Clarksville, Tennessee
- WCTD-LD in Ducktown, Tennessee
- WCTU-LD in Pensacola, Florida
- WDES-CD in Destin, Florida
- WDNM-LD in Memphis, Tennessee
- WDVB-CD in Edison, New Jersey
- WDWO-CD in Detroit, Michigan
- WEBU-LD in Water Valley, Mississippi
- WEEL-LD in Tuscaloosa, Alabama
- WFGZ-LD in Lake City, Florida
- WJAC-TV in Altoona, Pennsylvania
- WKNX-LD in Pinconning, Michigan
- WKPT-CD in Kingsport, Tennessee
- WMNS-LD in Charlotte Amalie, U.S. Virgin Islands
- WOCB-CD in Marion, Ohio
- WPFN-CD in Panama City, Florida
- WPHY-CD in Trenton, New Jersey
- WSJN-CD in San Juan, Puerto Rico
- WSPA-TV (DRT) in Anderson, South Carolina
- WSWH-LD in Tuscaloosa, Alabama
- WTAE-TV (DRT) in Pittsburgh, Pennsylvania
- WTNO-CD in New Orleans, Louisiana
- WTOO-CD in Bolivar, Pennsylvania
- WTOO-LD in Clearfield, Pennsylvania
- WUBF-LD in Jacksonville, Florida
- WUTH-CD in Hartford, Connecticut
- WVEB-LD in Florence, South Carolina
- WVMA-CD in Winchendon, Massachusetts
- WWKH-CD in Uniontown, Pennsylvania

The following low-power stations, which are no longer licensed, formerly broadcast on analog or digital channel 22:

- K22DE in Tooele, Utah
- K22DO-D in Granite Falls, Minnesota
- K22EC-D in Juab, Utah
- K22EE in Morro Bay, California
- K22EU in Montoya, New Mexico
- K22FC-D in Grants Pass, Oregon
- K22FX in Orangeville, etc., Utah
- K22GT in Lake Charles, Louisiana
- K22HB in Mammoth Lakes, California
- K22HG in St. Charles, Missouri
- K22IT in Provo, Utah
- K22JD-D in Madera Peak, Arizona
- K22JK-D in Moses Lake, Washington
- K22JQ-D in Ardmore, Oklahoma
- K22JU-D in Rapid City, South Dakota
- K22LB-D in Squaw Valley, Oregon
- KEAT-LP in Amarillo, Texas
- KPAO-LP in Paso Robles, California
- KWHY-LP in Santa Barbara, California
- W22BN in Danbury, Connecticut
- W22CJ in Jacksonville, North Carolina
- W22DA in Frederick, Maryland
- W22DE in Dayton, Ohio
- WBLP-LP in Ocean City, Maryland
- WDQB-LD in Wilmington, North Carolina
- WDTJ-LP in Toledo, Ohio
- WEQA-LD in Florence, South Carolina
- WJZC-LP in Sevierville, Tennessee
- WQDS-LD in Athens, Georgia
