= List of television stations in Guam =

This is a list of broadcast television stations that are licensed in the United States territory of Guam.

== Full-power ==
- Stations are arranged by media market served and channel position.

Full-power television stations in Guam
Media market	Station	Channel	Primary affiliation(s)	Notes	Refs
Hagåtña	KUAM-TV	8	NBC, CBS on 8.2		
Hagåtña	KGTF	12	PBS		
Hagåtña	KTGM	14	ABC	(Note: Licensed to Tamuning, Guam.)	

== Low-power ==
Low-power television stations in Guam
Media market	Station	Channel	Primary affiliation(s)	Notes	Refs
Hagåtña	KPPI-LD	7	[Blank]	(Note: Licensed to Garapan, Saipan, in the Northern Mariana Islands.)	
Hagåtña	KEQI-LD	22	Fox		
Hagåtña	KTKB-LD	26	The CW		
Hagåtña	K28HS-D	28	[Blank]	(Note: Licensed to Agana, Guam.)	
Hagåtña	K30HB-D	30	[Blank]		
Hagåtña	K32GB-D	32	[Blank]		
Hagåtña	K36GJ-D	36	[Blank]		
