= Channel 22 virtual TV stations in the United States =

The following television stations operate on virtual channel 22 in the United States:

- K04QC-D in Palermo, California
- K12XB-D in Eureka Springs, Arkansas
- K12XP-D in Phoenix, Arizona
- K13UL-D in Hillsboro, New Mexico
- K15MI-D in Centralia/Chehalis, Washington
- K21OW-D in Lordsburg, New Mexico
- K22CU-D in Cortez, etc., Colorado
- K22JM-D in Gunnison, Colorado
- K22JN-D in Grand Junction, Colorado
- K22JS-D in Ashland, Oregon
- K22KD-D in Sioux Falls, South Dakota
- K22LJ-D in Mason City, Iowa
- K22OC-D in Fort Smith, Arkansas
- K22OG-D in Fargo, North Dakota
- K22OH-D in Helena, Montana
- K22OK-D in Waco, Texas
- K22OV-D in Caputa, South Dakota
- K22OW-D in Alexandria, Louisiana
- K25MP-D in Bonners Ferry, Idaho
- K28GJ-D in Hatch, New Mexico
- K28QE-D in Caballo, New Mexico
- K28QK-D in Pasco, Washington
- K29ED-D in Everett, Washington
- K30QI-D in Alamogordo, New Mexico
- K33QU-D in Jacks Peak, New Mexico
- K36KH-D in Alexandria, Minnesota
- KAOE-LD in Santa Fe, New Mexico
- KAWB in Brainerd, Minnesota
- KDCG-CD in Opelousas, Louisiana
- KEQI-LD in Dededo, Guam
- KFCT in Fort Collins, Colorado
- KFTS in Klamath Falls, Oregon
- KFXF-LD in Fairbanks, Alaska
- KLCW-TV in Wolfforth, Texas
- KLFB-LD in Salinas, California
- KLKW-LD in Amarillo, Texas
- KLTJ in Galveston, Texas
- KMDF-LD in Midland, Texas
- KNAV-LD in Dallas, Texas
- KPXG-TV in Salem, Oregon
- KQFX-LD in Columbia, Missouri
- KRCB in Cotati, California
- KRID-LD in Boise, Idaho
- KRWG-TV in Las Cruces, New Mexico
- KSCN-TV in Los Angeles, California
- KSKN in Spokane, Washington
- KTOU-LD in Oklahoma City, Oklahoma
- KTUO-LD in Tulsa, Oklahoma
- KUMY-LD in Beaumont, Texas
- KWBJ-CD in Morgan City, Louisiana
- KZJO in Seattle, Washington
- KZMM-CD in Fresno, California
- KZVU-LD in Chico, California
- W22CY-D in Clarksburg, West Virginia
- W22EL-D in Vanderbilt, Michigan
- W22EN-D in Manteo, North Carolina
- W22EP-D in Starkville, Mississippi
- W22FH-D in Fort Wayne, Indiana
- W22FK-D in Baraboo, Wisconsin
- W22FN-D in Wilmington, North Carolina
- WBMM in Tuskegee, Alabama
- WCBZ-CD in Marion, Ohio
- WCKV-LD in Clarksville, Tennessee
- WCLF in Clearwater, Florida
- WCTD-LD in Ducktown, Tennessee
- WCTE in Cookeville, Tennessee
- WEEL-LD in Tuscaloosa, Alabama
- WFGZ-LD in Lake City, Florida
- WFVX-LD in Bangor, Maine
- WGPS-LD in Fort Myers, Florida
- WHLT in Hattiesburg, Mississippi
- WJCL in Savannah, Georgia
- WKEF in Dayton, Ohio
- WKNX-LD in Pinconning, Michigan
- WKPI-TV in Pikeville, Kentucky
- WLEK-LD in Concord, New Hampshire
- WLFL in Raleigh, North Carolina
- WLWK-CD in Sturgeon Bay, Wisconsin
- WMEC in Macomb, Illinois
- WMNS-LD in Charlotte Amalie, U.S. Virgin Islands
- WMPT in Annapolis, Maryland
- WMTO-LD in Norfolk, Virginia
- WOVA-LD in Parkersburg, West Virginia
- WPFN-CD in Panama City, Florida
- WPNT in Pittsburgh, Pennsylvania
- WQXT-CD in St. Augustine, Florida
- WRJK-LD in Arlington Heights, Illinois
- WSBS-CD in Miami, etc., Florida
- WSBS-TV in Key West, Florida
- WSBT-TV in South Bend, Indiana
- WSKC-CD in Atlanta, Georgia
- WSWH-LD in Tuscaloosa, Alabama
- WTNO-CD in New Orleans, Louisiana
- WTOO-LD in Clearfield, Pennsylvania
- WTVU-CD in Syracuse, New York
- WVDO-LD in Carolina, Puerto Rico
- WVEB-LD in Florence, South Carolina
- WVNY in Burlington, Vermont
- WVUT in Vincennes, Indiana
- WWLP in Springfield, Massachusetts
- WXNJ-LD in Wanaque, New Jersey
- WYOU in Scranton, Pennsylvania

The following television stations, which are no longer licensed, formerly operated on virtual channel 22:

- K06QG-D in Sioux City, Iowa
- K21CD-D in Ukiah, California
- K22JK-D in Moses Lake, Washington
- K22JQ-D in Ardmore, Oklahoma
- K22JU-D in Rapid City, South Dakota
- KWWF in Waterloo, Iowa
- WDQB-LD in Wilmington, North Carolina
- WEQA-LD in Florence, South Carolina
- WQDS-LD in Athens, Georgia
