= KUAM =

KUAM may refer to:

- KUAM-TV, a television station (channel 8) licensed to Agana, Guam
- KUAM-LP, a low-power television station (channel 20) licensed to Tamuning, Guam
- KICH, a radio station (612 AM/630 AM) licensed to Agana, Guam, which held the call sign KUAM from 1954 to 2021
- KUAM-FM, a radio station (93.9 FM) licensed to Agana, Guam
