= Fox 22 =

Fox 22 may refer to one of the following television stations in the United States affiliated with the Fox Broadcasting Company:

== Current ==
- KEQI-LD in Dededo, Guam
- KFCT in Fort Collins, Colorado
  - Satellite of KDVR in Denver, Colorado
- KQFX-LD in Columbia, Missouri
- WFVX-LD in Bangor, Maine
- WKEF-DT2, a digital subchannel of WKEF in Dayton, Ohio
- WOVA-LD in Parkersburg, West Virginia
- WSBT-DT2, a digital channel of WSBT-TV in South Bend, Indiana

== Former ==
- K22EY/K22EY-D/KFXF-LD in Fairbanks, Alaska (2003–2017)
- WLFL-TV/WLFL in Raleigh, North Carolina (1986–1998)
