= KGUM =

KGUM may refer to:

- KGUM (AM), a radio station (567 AM) licensed to Agana, Guam
- KGUM-FM, a radio station (105.1 FM) licensed to Dededo, Guam
