= WMNS =

WMNS may refer to:

- WMNS-LD, a low-power television station (channel 22) licensed to Charlotte Amalie, U.S. Virgin Islands
- WOEN, a radio station (1360 AM) licensed to Olean, New York, United States, which formerly used the WMNS call sign
- KMNV, a radio station (1400 AM) licensed to Saint Paul, Minnesota, United States, which formerly used the WMNS call sign
