= KZGU =

Radio station in Mangilao, Guam

Route 99 FM (KZGU)
- Mangilao; Guam
- Broadcast area: Guam
- Frequency: 99.5 MHz
- Branding: Route 99 FM

Programming
- Format: Country music

Ownership
- Owner: Glimpse Media
- Sister stations: KGUM-FM, KZGZ, KPXP

History
- First air date: July 12, 1991 (in Northern Mariana Islands); August 13, 2014 (in Guam)

Technical information
- Licensing authority: FCC
- Facility ID: 60854
- Class: C2
- ERP: 17,000 watts
- HAAT: 197 meters
- Transmitter coordinates: 13°29′21″N 144°49′41″E

Links
- Public license information: Public file; LMS
- Website: https://route99fm.com/

KZGU (99.5 FM), branded as Route 99 FM, is a commercial FM radio station licensed to Mangilao, Guam. It is owned by Glimpse Media and airs a country music format.

== History ==
The station was assigned the KPXP call letters by the Federal Communications Commission on July 12, 1991. The station changed to its current KZGU call sign on April 21, 2014, coinciding with its move to Guam from the Northern Mariana Islands. At the same time, the former KRSI became KPXP, retaining the Power 99 name and format despite being on 97.9 MHz.

On October 12, 2023, Sorensen Media Group opted to sell the station to Glimpse Media, and after a lot of speculation about the station's future. On the next day, radio station signed off together with sister stations KGUM-FM, KGUM (AM) and KZGZ, due to a format changes.

On March 8, 2025, KZGU relaunched as "Route 99" with a country format.
