= WBNB =

WBNB may refer to:

- WBNB (FM), a radio station (91.3 FM) licensed to serve Equality, Alabama, United States
- WBNB-TV, a defunct television station (channel 10) formerly licensed to serve Charlotte Amalie, U.S. Virgin Islands
