= KICH =

Radio station in Dededo, Guam

- Hagåtña, Guam; Guam
- Broadcast area: Guam
- Frequency: 630 kHz
- Branding: Isla63

Programming
- Format: Chamorro music/Talk (online only)

Ownership
- Owner: Good News Broadcasting Corporation

History
- First air date: March 14, 1954
- Former call signs: KUAM (1954–2021)
- Former frequencies: 610 kHz (1954–1978); 612 kHz (1978–2007)

Technical information
- Licensing authority: FCC
- Facility ID: 51236
- Class: B
- Power: 10,000 watts
- Transmitter coordinates: 13°26′53″N 144°45′22″E

Links
- Public license information: Public file; LMS
- Website: kuam.com

KICH (630 AM) is a radio station broadcasting from the village of Dededo, in the United States territory of Guam.

As KUAM, it was Guam's first commercial radio station, broadcasting from 1954 to 2020. It aired Chamorro music and talk radio. Isla63 became an online radio station when Pacific Telestations discontinued operation in 2020 for economic reasons and sold the license.

== History ==
The station was owned by Pacific Telestations, LLC (a company of the local conglomerate Calvo Enterprises, Inc.) and was Guam's first commercial radio station, having signed on the air on March 14, 1954. When it started up, the Armed Forces Radio Service station that had operated at 1380 kHz since September 1949 ceased operations. It was originally owned by Harry Engel and his Radio Guam; Engel started KUAM-TV (channel 8) three years later. The station was sold in 1964 to Pacific Broadcasting Corporation and to Pacific Telestations in 1977.

Long known as "Isla61", KUAM changed its broadcast frequency from 612 kHz to 630 kHz in July 2007. This move enables most radios with digital tuners found locally (built for the Americas' ITU Region 2 interval of 10 kHz) to tune precisely to the station's frequency instead of being 2 kHz off (when tuned to 610 kHz).

After Typhoon Pongsona hit Guam on December 8, 2002, Isla61 was off the air for more than one year. Programs such as the morning talk "Positively Local" and the TV news simulcast were instead carried by sister station KUAM-FM. The KUAM-TV nightly newscast at 6 p.m. was simulcast on Isla63.

On April 20, 2020, it was confirmed that KUAM Communications would conclude broadcasting after 66 years on the radio on May 1. In filing to take the station temporarily silent, Pacific noted that it had discontinued operation of KUAM for economic reasons.

The license was then donated to Good News Broadcasting Corporation effective May 10, 2021. New KICH call letters were applied on May 18, 2021.

== See also ==
- KISH: Chamorro FM station
