= WVMA =

WVMA may refer to:

- WVMA-CD, a low-power television station (channel 22, virtual 17) licensed to serve Winchendon, Massachusetts, United States
- WNOH, a radio station (105.3 FM) licensed to serve Windsor, Virginia, United States, which held the call sign WVMA from 2010 to 2013
