= WYCI =

Television station in Saranac Lake, New York

- Saranac Lake–Plattsburgh, New York; Burlington, Vermont; United States
- City: Saranac Lake, New York
- Channels: Digital: 34 (UHF); Virtual: 40
- Branding: WYCI

Programming
- Affiliations: 40.1: Independent with MyNetworkTV; for others, see § Subchannels

Ownership
- Owner: Gray Media; (Gray Television Licensee, LLC)
- Sister stations: WCAX-TV

History
- Founded: February 16, 2006
- First air date: September 11, 2007
- Former call signs: WCWF (2006–2009); WNMN (2009–2016)
- Former channel numbers: Analog: 40 (UHF, 2007–2009); Digital: 40 (UHF, 2009–2018)
- Former affiliations: Ion Television (2007–2009); Retro TV (2009–2014); Tuff TV (2014–2017)
- Call sign meaning: Yankee Communications International

Technical information
- Licensing authority: FCC
- Facility ID: 77515
- ERP: 11.4 kW
- HAAT: 97 m (318 ft)
- Transmitter coordinates: 44°20′28.3″N 74°7′41.5″W

Links
- Public license information: Public file; LMS

Translator
- W26FR-D
- Charlestown, New Hampshire; Rockingham, Vermont; United States
- Channels: Digital: 26 (UHF); Virtual: 40

History
- Founded: February 28, 2005
- First air date: March 2006
- Former call signs: W47CS (February–June 2005); WVBQ-CD (June 2005–2012); WYCU-LD (2012–2026)
- Former channel numbers: Analog: 47 (UHF, 2006–2012)
- Former affiliations: Outside TV (2006–2013); Retro TV (2013–2018)

Technical information
- Facility ID: 189163
- Class: LD
- ERP: 9.6 kW
- HAAT: 314.9 m (1,033 ft)
- Transmitter coordinates: 43°23′46″N 72°17′51″W

Links
- Public license information: LMS

WYCI (channel 40) is a television station licensed to Saranac Lake, New York, United States, serving the Burlington, Vermont–Plattsburgh, New York area. It is programmed primarily as an independent station, but maintains a secondary affiliation with MyNetworkTV. WYCI is owned by Gray Media alongside CBS affiliate WCAX-TV (channel 3) and the two stations share studios on Joy Drive in South Burlington, Vermont; WYCI's transmitter is located on Mount Pisgah north of Saranac Lake, along the Essex–Franklin county line.

Although WYCI is licensed as a full-power station, its broadcast range only covers the immediate Saranac Lake/Lake Placid area. Therefore, the station currently relies on cable and satellite carriage to reach the entire Burlington–Plattsburgh market. A translator licensed to Charlestown, New Hampshire, W26FR-D, operates as a translator of WYCI serving southern Vermont and western New Hampshire; this station's transmitter is located in Claremont, New Hampshire.

== History ==
The station applied for its construction permit on September 22, 1995. The Federal Communications Commission (FCC) approved it on October 4, 2004. It originally planned to use UHF analog channel 61 (from which the Channel 61 Associates, LLC name for the station's licensee was derived) but switched to channel 40 because channels 51-69 would not to be used for television after the DTV transition. In 2006, the station decided on the callsign WCWF, sparking speculation that the station would be an affiliate of The CW. However, that affiliation went to Fox affiliate WFFF-TV (channel 44), first as a replacement for its secondary WB affiliation and then on a new digital subchannel. (The CW affiliation later moved to a subchannel of NBC affiliate WPTZ, channel 5, in 2013 and would later relocate to sister station WNNE, channel 31, in 2018).

While it searched for its own affiliation, WCWF finally began broadcasting on September 11, 2007, as a repeater of Ion Television affiliate WWBI-LP, whose owners held a stake in the station. After a short time on-the-air, the station signed off, telling the FCC it was preparing to switch to digital. In November 2008, Channel 61 Associates sold the station to Twin Valley Television, a broadcaster based in Burlington which also goes by Convergence Entertainment & Communications, or CEC. Twin Valley took control of the station while the sale was still pending FCC approval. As of 2011, however, the application for transfer of ownership no longer appears on the FCC website.

At the end of 2008, it signed back on from a temporary low power analog transmitter, which was meant to last until its permanent digital transmitter was ready on June 12, 2009. However, there were delays in getting its new transmitter installed so the station switched its temporary transmitter to digital for the time being. In early 2009, the station became an affiliate of the Retro Television Network (RTV). On June 16, 2009, WCWF changed its call letters to WNMN.

Meanwhile, Twin Valley also purchased WGMU-CA (formerly Vermont's MyNetworkTV affiliate once owned by Equity Media Holdings) which was approved by the FCC in July 2009. That station and its translators were turned into repeaters of WNMN, which greatly expanded its coverage area into the greater Burlington and Plattsburgh areas. The owner announced that WNMN would air a mix of RTV and local programming on its main channel, while also carrying five digital subchannels, one of which would air MyNetworkTV (WGMU's former affiliation). The 40.3 subchannel would supplement MyNetworkTV programming with Tuff TV on July 15, 2010. The subchannel was to be carried on Comcast channel 18, but was never made available.

Cross Hill Communications, LLC was granted the license of WNMN by the FCC on October 30, 2013. At that time they became a Tuff TV affiliate. On March 9, 2016, the call sign was changed to WYCI. As of 2017, most likely as a direct result of this transition of station management, WYCI offered no subchannels other than its primary Retro TV channel, leaving the Burlington–Plattsburgh market without a MyNetworkTV affiliate. As of April 1, 2017, WYCI became a Heroes & Icons (H&I) affiliate; sometime in 2018, they eventually resumed operations of its second subchannel, this time offering the Decades (now Catchy Comedy) service. WYCI is carried on Comcast and Spectrum (former Time Warner Cable and Charter) systems throughout the market. By January 1, 2018, both Dish Network and DirecTV started carrying WYCI throughout the market. On September 3, 2018, MyNetworkTV programming returned to the Burlington–Plattsburgh market, this time on WYCI's primary channel as a secondary affiliation to Heroes & Icons; H&I continued to air in all time slots not filled by MyNetworkTV's two-hour nightly block. However, MyNetworkTV became WYCI's primary affiliation on June 1, 2021, displacing H&I to 40.2 and Decades to a new 40.3 subchannel. Syndicated programming now occupies non-MyNetworkTV timeslots.

On October 31, 2019, Gray Television announced plans to acquire WYCI from Cross Hill Communications. The sale was completed on January 31, 2020, forming a duopoly with WCAX-TV. In November 2020, Gray applied to add a second transmitter on Terry Mountain in Peru, New York, from which it would fully cover the Champlain Valley area. This construction never took place, however, and Gray returned the permit one month ahead of its August 2025 expiration.

In 2025, WYCI reached an agreement with the Boston Red Sox to air four spring training games. The station also airs spring training and regular season New York Mets games syndicated by WPIX, as well as selected Vermont Lake Monsters and Vermont Green FC home games. All sports broadcasts are simulcast on WCAX's "3 News Now" subchannel (virtual channel 3.6) to allow coverage to the entire market.

== Technical information ==
=== Subchannels ===
The station's signal is multiplexed:

Subchannels of WYCI
Channel	Res.	Short name	Programming
40.1	1080i	MyNet	Main WYCI programming
40.2	480i	Outlaw	Outlaw
40.3	480i	Comedy	Catchy Comedy
40.4	480i	DEFY	Defy
40.5	480i	Oxygen	Oxygen
40.6	480i	THE365	365BLK
40.7	480i	MeToons	MeTV Toons

=== Translators ===
WNMN was previously relayed on a network of four translators:

- WGMU-LP 39 Burlington, Vermont
- W19BR 19 Monkton, Vermont
- WBVT-LP 30 Burlington, Vermont
- WVMA-CD 47 (virtual 17) Claremont, New Hampshire

WGMU-LP, W19BR and WBVT-LP had their licenses cancelled by the FCC on March 12, 2015, for failure to broadcast for a year. WVMA-CD was sold and is now licensed to Winchendon, Massachusetts.
