= Fox 6 =

Fox 6 may refer to one of the following television stations in the United States that are currently affiliated or were former affiliates of the American broadcast network Fox:

== Current ==
- KEQI-LD in Dededo, Guam (virtual channel 22, brands with cable channel)
- KIDY in San Angelo, Texas
- KREZ-DT2, a digital channel of KREZ-TV in Roswell, New Mexico
  - Satellite of KRQE-DT2 in Albuquerque, New Mexico
- WABG-DT2, a subchannel of WABG-TV in Greenville–Greenwood, Mississippi (brands with cable channel)
- WBRC in Birmingham, Alabama
- WGGB-DT2, a subchannel of WGGB-TV in Springfield, Massachusetts (brands with cable channel)
- WITI in Milwaukee, Wisconsin (O&O)
- WLUC-DT2, a subchannel of WLUC-TV in Marquette, Michigan; (brands as "Fox UP")

== Former ==
- WCIX (now WFOR-TV), Miami, Florida (1986–1989)
- XETV-TDT, San Diego, California (licensed to Tijuana, Baja California, Mexico; 1986–2008)
