= CBS 10 =

CBS 10 may refer to:

- Network 10, an Australian television network owned by Paramount Skydance Corporation

== United States television stations ==
- KFDA-TV in Amarillo, Texas
- KLFY-TV in Lafayette, Louisiana
- KOLN in Lincoln, Nebraska
- KOLR-TV in Springfield, Missouri
- KTVL in Medford, Oregon
- KWTX-TV in Waco, Texas
- KZTV in Corpus Christi, Texas
- WBNS-TV in Columbus, Ohio
- WTAJ-TV in Altoona, Pennsylvania
- WTHI-TV in Terre Haute, Indiana
- WTSP-TV in Tampa, Florida

== Formerly affiliated ==
- KBIM-TV in Roswell, New Mexico (1966–2026)
  - Was a satellite of KRQE in Albuquerque, New Mexico
- KSAZ-TV in Phoenix, Arizona (1953–1994)
- KXTV, Sacramento, California (1955–1995)
- WBIR-TV, Knoxville, Tennessee (1956–1988)
- WBNB-TV, U.S. Virgin Islands (1961–1989)
- WCAU, Philadelphia, Pennsylvania (1946–1995)
- WHEC-TV, Rochester, New York (1953–1989)
- WILM-LD, Wilmington, North Carolina (2000–2016)
