= WBNB-TV =

Television station in the U.S. Virgin Islands (1961–1989)

- Charlotte Amalie; United States Virgin Islands
- Channels: Analog: 10 (VHF)

Programming
- Affiliations: CBS (1961–1989); NBC (secondary, 1961–1983); NET (secondary, 1961–1970)

Ownership
- Owner: see § Ownership

History
- Founded: 1960
- First air date: July 22, 1961
- Last air date: September 17, 1989
- Call sign meaning: "Bob and Bob" (Bob Noble and Bob Moss, station co-founders)

Technical information
- Facility ID: 4684 (deleted)

WBNB-TV (channel 10) was a television station in Charlotte Amalie, on the island of Saint Thomas in the United States Virgin Islands. The station operated from 1961 until 1989 and was a primary affiliate of CBS.

== History ==
WBNB-TV was the first television station to operate in the Virgin Islands. Its construction permit was secured in 1960 by a pair of New York City-area radio men, Robert Noble and Robert Moss, who shared equal ownership in Island Teleradio Service, Inc., the original licensee of WBNB-TV and sister station WBNB radio (1000 AM, now WVWI); their names ("Bob and Bob") served as the basis for the station's callsign. Shortly after the award, newspaper advertisements proudly announced that the station would be affiliated with CBS and NBC (but would be a primary CBS affiliate), and would also carry programs from National Educational Television (NET), the predecessor to PBS. The station began operations on July 22, 1961. Color broadcasting was started in 1968.

The WBNB stations were split up in 1970, as channel 10 was sold to the first of five different U.S. mainland-based operators (see § Ownership, below). At that point, the Moss/Noble partnership ended when Bob Noble retained sole ownership in the radio outlet, purchasing its remaining shares from Bob Moss and other minority partners.

On September 17, 1989, Hurricane Hugo made landfall on the Virgin Islands, destroying WBNB-TV's studios and transmitter facilities in the process and knocking the station off the air. Benedek Broadcasting, who acquired the station three years earlier, did not have the financial resources to rebuild it right away. Despite remaining off-the-air, the station's broadcast license remained active until 1995, when the Federal Communications Commission (FCC) forced Benedek to surrender the license for cancellation on grounds of abandonment.

CBS programming returned to the Virgin Islands in 1999 via WVXF (channel 17), though the network switched to TV2 in 2009 (WVXF is now a primary Cozi TV affiliate; from then until 2019, CBS programs were shown on WMNS-LD; they are now seen on WCVI-TV). Between 1989 and 1999, satellite service was the only way to access CBS programs in the Virgin Islands (first via East Coast network flagship WCBS-TV, then via WSEE-TV from Erie, Pennsylvania, the latter of which remains available on cable and satellite providers in the Caribbean).

=== Ownership ===
- 1961–1970: Island Teleradio Service, Inc., original licensee and owners (Robert Moss and Robert Noble, principals).
- 1970–1972: Television Communications Corp., New York–based cable television system operator and a forerunner of Time Warner Cable.
- 1972–1974: Federated Media Inc., formed by stockholders of Television Communications Corp. after its cable systems were sold to Warner Communications.
- 1974–1980: District Communications, Inc., Washington, D.C.–based group of minority investors.
- 1980–1986: Worrell Newspapers, Inc., then-publishers of The Daily Progress of Charlottesville, Virginia.
- 1986–1995: Benedek Broadcasting, Hoffman Estates, Illinois–based group broadcaster.
