= KISH =

Radio station in Hagåtña, Guam

- Hagåtña; Guam
- Broadcast area: Guam
- Frequency: 102.9 MHz
- Branding: KISH 102.9

Programming
- Format: Chamorro music

Ownership
- Owner: Inter-Island Communications

History
- First air date: May 16, 2003
- Call sign meaning: ISland Hits

Technical information
- Licensing authority: FCC
- Facility ID: 78492
- Class: C2
- ERP: 25,000 watts
- HAAT: 177.6 meters
- Transmitter coordinates: 13°29′17″N 144°49′53″E

Links
- Public license information: Public file; LMS

KISH (102.9 FM) is the first all-Chamorro music format FM station in Guam. It is owned and operated by Inter-Island Communications and is licensed to Hagåtña. The station signed on the air in May 2003.

== See also ==
- KICH (AM), a former Chamorro AM station
