= Guam Cable TV =

Marianas Communications System Inc., doing business as Guam Cable TV was the first cable television company in Guam. It was founded in 1971 and acquired by Marianas Cablevision in 1997.

== History ==
Guam Cable TV was set up by Lee M. Holmes (who died in 2019) on August 4, 1971; he lead the company throughout its 26 years of oepration. In its early months, the company carried CBS shows that were left out by KUAM, such as Gunsmoke, My Three Sons, You Are There, Hawaii Five-O and Cimarron Strip. Authorities claimed that Guam Cable TV was airing these shows illegally, as they were recorded from the mainland and charged to subscribers (over 2,000 as of March 1972). A further agreement with the MPAA was signed in September 1975 to reduce piracy. That year, it was reported to carry eight channels (including relays of KUAM-TV and KGTF; listings for over-the-air and Guam Cable TV channels were carried on the TV Guam magazine.

In 1975, Guam Cable TV started producing its own news operation, competing with KUAM-TV and produced by Communications Services, Inc. As of 1980, it produced an hour-long bulletin at 6p.m., as well as a half-hour update at 10p.m.; on weekends, the 6p.m. bulletin lasted only half an hour and was repeated at 10p.m.; that year, it won a CableACE Award in the news category. (Note: The December 1, 1980 issue of Broadcasting incorrectly referred to the Guam Cable TV news as the only news service on the island. The December 22 issue featured a note from KUAM manager rectifying its editors, who received the information from an NCTA publication.) By January 1995, it was a CNN affiliate. Later that year, Len Ping left Guam Cable TV's news operation for WSVN.

There was also a separate cable company in Saipan, Saipan Cable TV, operational as early as 1976. Both were acquired by Marianas Cablevision, owned by the United Micronesia Development Association, in 1997. The acquisition is likely attributed to the 1997 Asian financial crisis. The MCV operations in both Guam and Saipan were ultimately sold to NTT Docomo in 2013, the service is currently provided under its subsidiary Docomo Pacific.
