= Channel 7 branded TV stations in the United States =

The following television stations in the United States brand as channel 7 (though neither using virtual channel 7 nor broadcasting on physical RF channel 7):

- KNSD in San Diego, California
- KTGM in Tamuning, Guam
- WDAY-DT2 in Fargo, North Dakota
- WPTA-DT2 in Fort Wayne, Indiana
- WWMT-DT2 in Kalamazoo, Michigan
- WWSB in Sarasota, Florida
- WZVN-TV in Naples, Florida

The following television stations in the United States formerly branded as channel 7:

- WPTA-DT2 in Fort Wayne, Indiana
