= KTVF =

Television station in Fairbanks, Alaska

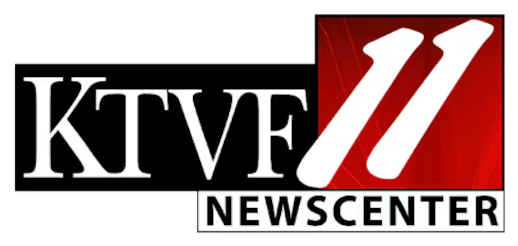
- Fairbanks, Alaska; United States
- Channels: Digital: 26 (UHF); Virtual: 11
- Branding: KTVF Channel 11

Programming
- Affiliations: 11.1: NBC; 11.2: Last Frontier SEN /; MyNetworkTV; 11.3: CBS

Ownership
- Owner: Gray Media; (Gray Television Licensee, LLC)
- Sister stations: KFXF-CD, KXDF-CD, KTUU-TV

History
- First air date: February 17, 1955
- Former channel numbers: Analog: 11 (VHF, 1955–2009)
- Former affiliations: CBS (primary 1955–April 1996; secondary April–August 1996); NTA (secondary, 1956–1961); ABC (secondary, 1971–1985); NBC (secondary, 1985–April 1996); UPN (secondary, 1995–2000); Fox (DT2, via KFXF-LD, January–November 2017)
- Call sign meaning: Television Fairbanks

Technical information
- Licensing authority: FCC
- Facility ID: 49621
- ERP: 27 kW
- HAAT: 471 m (1,545 ft)
- Transmitter coordinates: 64°52′43.4″N 148°3′22.7″W
- Translator(s): 11 (VHF) Fairbanks

Links
- Public license information: Public file; LMS
- Website: www.webcenterfairbanks.com

KTVF (channel 11) is a television station in Fairbanks, Alaska, United States, affiliated with NBC. It is owned by Gray Media alongside two low-power Class A stations: KFXF-CD (channel 7) and CBS affiliate KXDF-CD (channel 13). The stations share studios on Braddock Street in downtown Fairbanks; KTVF's transmitter is located on the Ester Dome.

KTVF is used to provide full-market over-the-air high definition coverage of KFXF-LD (simulcast over KTVF-DT2) and KXDF-CD (simulcast over KTVF-DT3). The station also operates a digital fill-in translator on VHF channel 11 from a transmitter located at its studios.

== History ==
The station signed on the air on February 17, 1955, as the first television station serving what at the time was the smallest television market in the United States. The station was a CBS affiliate until April 1, 1996.

While primarily a CBS station, KTVF also served as a secondary affiliate for ABC from 1971 to 1985 (when it aired some of ABC's top-rated shows like Marcus Welby, M.D., Happy Days, Laverne & Shirley, Three's Company, and Eight is Enough as well as Wide World of Sports, Monday Night Football and the Academy Awards) and NBC from 1985 to 1996. During the late 1950s, the station was also briefly affiliated with the NTA Film Network. In 1967, months after the Chena River flood temporarily knocked them off the air, KTVF rebuilt their studios in the Northward Building (where they still remained until 1990) and returned to the air, this time broadcasting in color.

In 1996, KTVF switched affiliations, from CBS to NBC. The reason for the network switch was that rival station KATN—which had the NBC affiliation since signing on a couple weeks after KTVF but had been primarily with ABC since 1984—would be merged with two other ABC stations in Anchorage and Juneau to form ABC Alaska's SuperStation, and that NBC was the dominant network by the 1995–96 season while CBS was in third place. KTVF also carried UPN programming on weekends from 1995 to 2000. KFXF aired a few CBS shows until K13XD (now KXDF-CD) signed on in August.

KTVF was founded by Alaska broadcasting pioneer Augie Hiebert and his company, Northern Television. It was thus a sister station to KTVA-TV in Anchorage, which signed on two years earlier. Hiebert retired in 1997, and his family sold the station to the Ackerley Group in 1999. Ackerley merged with Clear Channel Communications in 2001. Clear Channel sold its entire television division, including KTVF, to Newport Television in 2007.

In June 2003, Media News Group, owner of the Fairbanks Daily News-Miner, announced that it would exercise an option to purchase KTVF. The seven-year option, pending removal of the FCC's restrictions on newspaper/broadcast ownership, was granted to Media News in 1999 when Northern Television sold the station to Ackerley. The FCC eliminated this rule on June 3, 2003, but implementation was stayed pending the outcome of litigation. Media News' purchase attempt never materialized; the seven-year option period expired in 2006 without renewal.

KTVF began airing high definition programming from NBC on February 12, 2010, at the start of the Winter Olympics in Vancouver; full HD broadcasting (both NBC and syndicated) would follow on May 31, 2012.

On September 29, 2010, the FCC granted KTVF a construction permit for a fill-in translator on their former analog allotment channel 11. The translator will serve sections of the Fairbanks area.

Newport announced the sale of KTVF to Chena Broadcasting, a local company owned by Michael Young, on October 13, 2011. Young had previously owned a partial stake in Tanana Valley Television, owner of KFXF and K13XD; that company took over KTVF's operations under a shared services agreement upon the deal's completion. The sale of KTVF to Chena Broadcasting was consummated on March 7, 2012—resulting in all of Fairbanks' commercial stations being operated by just two companies.

On November 8, 2016, Northern Lights Media, the subsidiary of Gray Television that operates Anchorage stations KTUU-TV and KYES-TV, announced that it would buy KTVF, KFXF-LD and KXDF-CD (then known as KXDD-CD) for $8 million in cash; the sale was completed on January 13, 2017.

The station's local newscasts ceased in November 2024. Moving forward, KTVF and KXDF-CD will air newscasts from sister station KTUU, which will be reoriented to a statewide focus. This eliminated the last locally-focused news department in the market.

== Technical information ==
=== Subchannels ===
The station's signal is multiplexed:

Subchannels of KTVF
Channel	Res.	Short name	Programming
11.1	1080i	KTVF1	NBC
11.2	720p	KTVF2	Last Frontier SEN / MyNetworkTV (KFXF-CD)
11.3	1080i	KTVF3	CBS (KXDF-CD)
11.4	480i	KTVF4	MeTV

Simulcast of subchannels of another station

=== Analog-to-digital conversion ===
KTVF shut down its analog signal, over VHF channel 11, on June 12, 2009, the official date on which full-power television stations in the United States transitioned from analog to digital broadcasts under federal mandate. The station's digital signal remained on its pre-transition UHF channel 26, using virtual channel 11.
