= KXDF-CD =

Television station in Fairbanks, Alaska

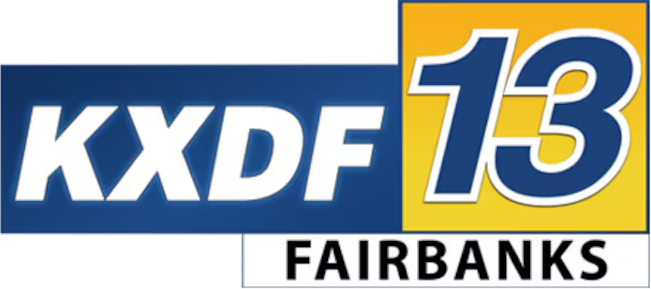
- Fairbanks, Alaska; United States
- Channels: Digital: 13 (VHF); Virtual: 13
- Branding: KXDF Channel 13

Programming
- Affiliations: 13.1: CBS; 13.2: NBC

Ownership
- Owner: Gray Media; (Gray Television Licensee, LLC)
- Sister stations: KFXF-CD, KTVF

History
- First air date: August 7, 1996
- Former call signs: K13XD (1995–2012); K13XD-D (2012–November 2016); KXDD-CD (November-December 2016)
- Former channel numbers: Analog: 13 (VHF, 1996–2012)
- Call sign meaning: "KXD Fairbanks" (derived from former K13XD call sign)

Technical information
- Licensing authority: FCC
- Facility ID: 64596
- Class: CD
- ERP: 3 kW
- HAAT: 275.4 m (904 ft)
- Transmitter coordinates: 64°55′19″N 147°43′4″W
- Translator(s): KFXF-CD 7.2 Fairbanks; KTVF-DT 11.3 Fairbanks

Links
- Public license information: Public file; LMS
- Website: www.webcenterfairbanks.com

KXDF-CD (channel 13) is a low-power, Class A television station in Fairbanks, Alaska, United States, affiliated with CBS. It is owned by Gray Media alongside KFXF-CD (channel 7) and NBC affiliate KTVF (channel 11). The stations share studios on Braddock Street in downtown Fairbanks; KXDF-CD's transmitter is located northeast of the city on Cranberry Ridge.

== History ==
KXDF-CD signed on the air on August 7, 1996, as K13XD, the area's sixth television station, four months after longtime CBS affiliate KTVF switched to NBC. It was owned by Tanana Valley Television Company alongside Fox affiliate KFXF. Before channel 13 signed on, select CBS programming had been seen on KFXF. The addition of K13XD meant that Fairbanks would finally have a station for each of the four main networks: KATN (ABC), KFXF (Fox), KTVF (NBC), and K13XD (CBS), along with KJNP-TV (TBN) and KUAC-TV (PBS).

In 2000, the station upgraded to a class A license, but retained its translator-style call sign; eventually the station branded with a contraction of its translator call as "KXD". In 2012, the station flash-cut from analog to digital, modifying its call sign to K13XD-D. The call letters were changed to KXDD-CD on November 7, 2016, and to KXDF-CD on December 16, 2016.

On November 8, 2016, Northern Lights Media, the subsidiary of Gray Television that operates Anchorage stations KTUU-TV and KYES-TV, announced that it would buy KXDD-CD, KFXF-LD and KTVF for $8 million in cash; the sale was completed on January 13, 2017.

=== Full-market over-the-air coverage ===
In addition to its own digital signal, KXDF-CD receives full-market over-the-air coverage via a high definition simulcast on KTVF's third digital subchannel (11.3) from a transmitter on the Ester Dome. The simulcast is most likely a direct compensation for how on March 2, 2017, Tanana Valley Television surrendered their license for KFYF (the original full-market over-the-air distributor of the programming of KFXF-LD) back to the FCC, which cancelled it on March 10. Like KTVF does presently, KFYF had simulcast KXDF-CD on a subchannel.

== Newscasts ==
Despite its ownership with KTVF, KXDF-CD continued to maintain a small-scale local news department separate from channel 11, airing two half-hour newscasts on weekdays at 5 and 11 p.m. Under its old ownership, the station's main news theme in the mid to late 2000s was the main menu theme to the 2000 video game Hitman: Codename 47.

The station's local newscast ceased in November 2024. Moving forward, KXDF-CD and KTVF will air newscasts from KTUU-TV.

== Subchannels ==
The station's signal is multiplexed:

Subchannels of KXDF-CD
Channel	Res.	Short name	Programming
13.1	1080i	KXDF1	CBS
13.2	480i	KXDF2	NBC (KTVF)

Simulcast of subchannels of another station
