= WSZE-TV =

- Saipan; Northern Mariana Islands
- Channels: Analog: 10 (VHF)

Programming
- Affiliations: CBS, ABC, NBC

Ownership
- Owner: Micronesian Broadcasting Corporation
- Sister stations: WSZE AM and FM; KUAM-TV

History
- First air date: October 1969
- Last air date: November 1980

Technical information
- Transmitter coordinates: 15°13′00″N 145°15′00″E

WSZE-TV (channel 10) was a television station on Saipan, the largest of the Northern Mariana Islands. The first station to be constructed on the island, it was owned by the Micronesian Broadcasting Corporation alongside WSZE AM and FM radio; it was sister to KUAM-TV, the commercial television station in Guam. It operated from 1969 to 1980.

== History ==
WSZE-TV began broadcasting in October 1969, airing commercial network programming as well as productions of the government of the Trust Territory of the Pacific Islands. The station was established by H. Scott Killgore after the Trust Territory government expressed skepticism that a translator of KUAM-TV itself would not provide appropriate service to Saipan; the government did accept a proposal in 1968 to build a full station with local program capability. Studios were set up in the Royal Taga Hotel, taking up two small rooms on the second floor; the master control had a door leading to the water heater for the hotel's laundry system, which had previously occupied the space.

WSZE-TV aired local news programming and Trust Territory government programming—some of it live—then live local news, followed by Sesame Street, the CBS Evening News and network entertainment fare, all recorded at the same video tape center in San Francisco that served KUAM-TV. Tapes were flown to Guam to be used on that station then ferried to Saipan on the Air Pacific air taxi service, which Killgore set up in part just to deliver tapes to the Saipan station. Of the small audience of 1,200 TV sets and 10,000 inhabitants, Killgore quipped, "It's the only television audience which we know all by their first names."

Killgore asked in 1973 to move the station from the hotel to a studio owned by the Marianas District Department of Education, which was being underutilized due to Trust Territory budget cuts. Negotiations to occupy the facility were lengthy, stretching late into 1974, after the money-losing television station announced that it would close by October 31 if the impasse, centered around the construction of a tower on military land, was not broken. When the station was approved for use of the studio, it then moved to secure use of the Navy Hill transmitter site used by KJQR, the government's radio station, as part of its expansion into AM and FM radio. The new Navy Hill antenna was installed in late 1975, replacing a temporary installation and improving reception on the island, and the radio stations began broadcasting in June 1976, giving listeners a choice. By 1977, the station was not airing Sesame Street or government programming, but it was offering a mix of network and syndicated fare and a 15-minute local newscast on weeknights; most of the network programs and the only network newscasts were from CBS, though ABC and NBC shows also were shown.

A Los Angeles Times profile of Saipan in January 1978 described the operation thusly:

The island television station is on the air daily from 4 p.m. to midnight and the radio station from 6 a.m. to midnight. Sports events are broadcast from two weeks to a month after they happen. Americans here are looking forward to seeing the Rose Bowl game sometime within the next several weeks. Advertisers pay $3 for a 30-second radio spot or $30 for an entire hour. TV ad rates are $5 for a 15-second spot or $80 for an entire hour. Islanders sometimes buy an hour to use it as they please.

The station went off air for a time in late 1979 to allow an antenna to be installed to receive programming direct from KUAM-TV on Guam. Plans for expansion were in the offing in November 1980; WSZE-TV was planning to increase its broadcast hours, and it aired coverage of the presidential election from the mainland by satellite after an earth station was completed for the island. Weeks later, however, the station left the air for good after its tower was blown down by Typhoon Dinah; it would have cost $20,000 to $25,000 to reconstruct.
