= K30HB-D =

- Hagåtña, Guam
- Channels: Digital: 30 (UHF); Virtual: 30

Programming
- Affiliations: NBC

Ownership
- Owner: E.C. Development Ventures; (MCS, LLC)
- Sister stations: K28HS-D, K32GB-D, K36GJ-D

History
- Founded: October 17, 2002
- Former call signs: K30HB (2002–2022)
- Former affiliations: TBN (October 17, 2002-November 9, 2007)

Technical information
- Licensing authority: FCC
- Facility ID: 129379
- ERP: 0.15 kW/15 m (analog)

Links
- Public license information: LMS

K30HB-D is a low-power television station in Hagåtña, Guam. Unlike its sister stations, K28HS-D 28, K32GB 32 and K36GJ-D 36, its signal reaches all of the island. From 2002 to 2007, it was a repeater of the Trinity Broadcast Network, but it is now a repeater of KUAM-TV. The station was sold along with other stations in late 2005.
