= KFYF =

Television station in Fairbanks, Alaska (1992–2017)

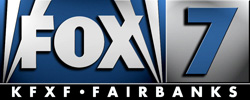
- Fairbanks, Alaska; United States
- Channels: Digital: 7 (VHF); Virtual: 7
- Branding: Fox 7; CBS 13 (7.2)

Programming
- Affiliations: 7.1: Fox; 7.2: CBS

Ownership
- Owner: Tanana Valley Television Company

History
- First air date: April 20, 1992
- Last air date: January 2, 2017 (24 years, 257 days) (license cancelled on March 10, 2017)
- Former call signs: K07UU (1992–1995); KFXF (1995–February 2017)
- Former channel numbers: Analog: 7 (VHF, 1992–2009); Digital: 22 (UHF, until 2009)
- Former affiliations: All secondary: NBC (NBA games, 1993–1994); CBS (April–August 1996); UPN (2000–2006)
- Call sign meaning: Fox Fairbanks

Technical information
- Licensing authority: FCC
- Facility ID: 64597
- ERP: 6.1 kW
- HAAT: 268 m (879 ft)
- Transmitter coordinates: 64°55′18.9″N 147°43′3.7″W
- Translator(s): KFXF-LD 22 Fairbanks

Links
- Public license information: Public file; LMS

KFYF (channel 7) was a television station in Fairbanks, Alaska, United States, last affiliated with the Fox network. The station was owned by Tanana Valley Television Company. KFYF's transmitter was located north of Fairbanks and its programming was simulcast on low-power translator KFXF-LD (channel 22). In January 2017, Northern Lights Media, a subsidiary of Gray Television, purchased KFXF-LD, KXDF-CD, and KTVF from Tanana Valley Television Company, which subsequently took KFYF off the air.

== History ==
Channel 7 in Fairbanks was originally assigned to KSEV in 1984; it was not known whether it would be an independent or network station. KSEV never signed on, and it would not be until 1992, when the station's owner, Bill St. Pierre, and a group of investors formed Tanana Valley Television, that channel 7 began broadcasting. The group put a low-power station, K07UU, on the air from April 20, 1992, as the area's first commercial station (and fifth in general after KJNP-TV in 1981) since 1955, when KTVF and KATN started; until then, they had been the only two major network stations. The station upgraded to a full-power license with the call letters KFXF on February 22, 1995. It was the only Fairbanks television station that had never changed its affiliation.

In its early years, K07UU/KFXF ran programming from Canadian music channel MuchMusic during the overnight hours, and for a time in 1993–94 carried the NBA on NBC. Until K13XD (now KXDF-CD) went on the air in August 1996, KFXF also carried a handful of CBS shows, such as 60 Minutes, The Young and the Restless and Late Show with David Letterman (as well as the championship game of the 1996 NCAA Final Four and the third and final rounds of the 1996 Masters), after KTVF relinquished their longtime affiliation with the network for NBC on April 1. The station also ran UPN programs from 2000 until 2006, when that network merged with The WB to form The CW, which is shown on a digital subchannel of KATN. KFXF considered becoming a secondary affiliate to Fox's sister network MyNetworkTV, but passed on it.

In September 2010, KFXF became the first network station in Fairbanks to broadcast prime time programming in high-definition.

In July 2012, Tanana Valley Television took over the operations of the Fairbanks NBC affiliate KTVF under a shared services agreement. While KTVF retained its own studios, some of its internal operations were moved to KFXF's studios. This resulted in Fairbanks' commercial stations being controlled by just two companies.

On November 8, 2016, Northern Lights Media, the subsidiary of Gray Television that operates the Anchorage stations KTUU-TV and KYES-TV, announced that it would buy KFXF-LD, KXDF-CD (then known as KXDD-CD), and KTVF for $8 million in cash, pending FCC approval. The sale was completed on January 13, 2017. The full-power KFXF license was not included in the sale because Fairbanks has only five full-power stations, not enough to legally permit a duopoly between KFXF and KTVF. On January 11, 2017, Tanana Valley Television informed the Federal Communications Commission (FCC) that it had taken the station dark. The call letters were changed to KFYF on February 9, 2017. KFXF-LD became the sole Fox outlet in the Interior.

On March 2, 2017, Tanaha Valley Television surrendered their license for KFYF back to the FCC, which cancelled it on March 10.

1990s News logo of KFXF, from 2000

KFXF 2000s large logo

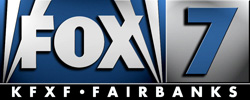
2008 logo of KFXF

== Technical information ==
=== Subchannels ===
The station's signal was multiplexed:

Subchannels of KFYF
Channel	Res.	Short name	Programming
7.1	720p	KFYF-DT	Fox
7.2	480i	K13XD-D	CBS (KXDF-CD)

Simulcast of subchannels of another station

=== Analog-to-digital conversion ===
KFYF (as KFXF) shut down its analog signal, over VHF channel 7, in January 2009. The station's digital signal relocated from its pre-transition UHF channel 22 to VHF channel 7. The station has applied to increase power to 6.1 kilowatts. K13XD, as a low-power station, was not legally required to go digital at that time.
