= WGMU-LP =

Television station in Burlington, Vermont (1994–2013)

Translator of WNMN, Saranac Lake, New York

Burlington, Vermont; United States
- Channels: Analog: 39 (UHF)
- Branding: WNMN TV 40

Programming
- Affiliations: Independent (1994–1995); The WB (1995–1999); UPN (1999–2006); America One (secondary, 2003); MyNetworkTV (2006–2008); Dark (2008–2009); Retro TV (2009–2013)

Ownership
- Owner: CEC Media Group; (Convergence Entertainment and Communications, LLC)

History
- First air date: July 26, 1994
- Last air date: November 18, 2013
- Former call signs: W39AS (1994–1998); WBVT-LP (1998–2004); WGMU-CA (2004–2012)
- Call sign meaning: Green Mountain UPN (refers to past affiliation)

Technical information
- Facility ID: 20588
- Class: TX
- ERP: 60.09 kW
- HAAT: 230.1 m (755 ft)
- Transmitter coordinates: 44°18′46″N 73°11′10″W
- Translator(s): see § Translators

WGMU-LP (channel 39) was a low-power television station in Burlington, Vermont, United States. It was a translator of Retro TV affiliate WNMN (channel 40) in Saranac Lake, New York. Owned by CEC Media Group, the station had studios on Pine Haven Shores Road in Shelburne, Vermont. Its transmitter was located in Charlotte, Vermont.

== History ==
WGMU-LP originally signed-on on July 26, 1994, as W39AS but identified themselves on-air as "WWIN". On January 11, 1995, the station joined The WB. In 1998, W39AS changed its call letters to WBVT-LP. In May 1999, WB programming began airing on Fox affiliate WFFF-TV in a secondary nature and WBVT-LP picked up UPN from WWBI-LP. During a period in 2003, the station aired America One programing during the day while showing a "UPN 39" logo in the top-right corner of the screen. The station aired UPN programming during prime time but would not air the network's children's shows. In 2004, WBVT-LP's previous owners (NYN, LLC) were experiencing financial problems which led them to give control of the station to Equity Media Holdings (then known as Equity Broadcasting). The company would buy the station outright in February 2005.

During times of financial trouble and the transition to Equity ownership, there were plenty of technical problems on the channel. There was a point where it would be off-air for days at a time. During this dark period, some area cable systems (including Adelphia in Burlington) temporarily replaced WBVT-LP with Boston's WSBK-TV. In 2005, once the station was in Equity's hands and back in shape, it changed its call letters again to WGMU-CA. This was done in order to distinguish itself as a UPN station and no longer a WB affiliate. In Fall 2006, UPN ceased broadcasting and merged with The WB into a new network called The CW. Only one UPN/WB affiliate in each market could join The CW, and WGMU-CA was rejected in favor of WFFF-TV. Instead, it joined MyNetworkTV, another new network created by News Corporation for former UPN/WB stations that could not affiliate with The CW. The new affiliation took effect on September 5 and WGMU-CA changed its branding to "My 39".

Before its MyNetworkTV affiliation, WGMU-CA did not have a website of its own. The station formerly had a website as WBVT-LP. When it was bought by Equity and changed to WGMU-CA, it got a website at gmupn.com that later disappeared. With the network switch, Equity created a new site for the station located at mytv-burlington.com which is no longer active. On December 8, 2008, Equity Media Holdings filed for bankruptcy. As a result, WGMU-CA was temporarily taken off the air. On April 16, 2009, Equity held an auction of all its television stations where WGMU-CA and its repeaters were bought by Convergence Media Group, which was also buying nearby station WCWF (which it recalled WNMN). The sale was approved by the Federal Communications Commission (FCC) in July 2009.

After this, WGMU-CA returned to the air as a satellite of WNMN, which became a Retro Television Network affiliate (vowing that MyNetworkTV became a programming service in 2009 instead of a full TV network). On cable, the station was seen in Burlington on Comcast channel 7 and in Plattsburgh on Charter channel 18. It was not seen on Vidéotron systems in Montreal. The nearest WGMU-CA outlying translator to Montreal, W52CD (channel 52) in St. Albans, barely reached the city. Syndicated programming on the station included Montel, Jerry Springer, Frasier, and Still Standing. It did not air any news or sports programs.

Prior to December 2010, WGMU-CA experienced long term blackouts (i.e. dead air; static/snow), lasting several weeks or months, and only broadcast sporadically. There had been no signal since, with the station now silent.

The station formerly had a construction permit for a digital transmitter on channel 49. However, the permit no longer appears in the FCC database as of early 2012.

WGMU-CA and repeater W19BR were downgraded from Class A status and reverted to standard low-power stations on October 24, 2012, due to failure to file children's television reports. WGMU-LP had been a Class A station since 2002, when the station was still WBVT-LP.

The FCC canceled the licenses of WGMU-LP and repeaters W19BR and WBVT-LP on March 12, 2015, for failure to broadcast for a year; WGMU-LP and W19BR had gone off the air on November 18, 2013, while WBVT shut down four days later. WGMU's former repeater in Claremont, New Hampshire, WVMA-CD, remains licensed as of March 2015; that station (formerly W17CI) had been sold to Sound Communications in 2013 and transferred to Novia Communications (a company partially co-owned with Sound) a year later. WVMA-CD is Novia Communications' only media holding outside of its usual territory of upstate New York. It has since moved to Providence, Rhode Island, and is now an affiliate of Antenna TV.

== Translators ==
WGMU-LP operated the following network of repeaters. These transmitters rebroadcast WNMN just like WGMU-LP itself.

- W19BR Monkton
- WVMA-CD 22 Claremont, NH (now Providence, RI) (Note: Now an Antenna TV affiliate; tower located in Foster, Rhode Island.)
- WBVT-LP 30 Burlington
- W36CP Newport
- W49BI Ellenburg, NY
- W52CD St. Albans
- W54CV Burlington
- W61CE Rutland
