= KLTJ =

Television station in Galveston, Texas

- Galveston–Houston, Texas; United States
- City: Galveston, Texas
- Channels: Digital: 23 (UHF); Virtual: 22

Programming
- Affiliations: 22.1: Daystar; 22.2: Daystar Español; 22.3: Daystar Reflections

Ownership
- Owner: Daystar Television Network; (Community Television Educators of Texas, Inc.)
- Sister stations: KDHU-LD

History
- First air date: July 20, 1989
- Former call signs: KUYA (1987–1989)
- Former channel numbers: Analog: 22 (UHF, 1989–2009)
- Former affiliations: Religious independent
- Call sign meaning: Keep Looking to Jesus

Technical information
- Licensing authority: FCC
- Facility ID: 24436
- ERP: 350 kW
- HAAT: 579 m (1,900 ft)
- Transmitter coordinates: 29°34′16″N 95°30′38″W

Links
- Public license information: Public file; LMS
- Website: www.daystar.com

KLTJ (channel 22) is a religious television station licensed to Galveston, Texas, United States, serving the Houston area. Owned by the Daystar Television Network through its Community Television Educators subsidiary, the station maintains transmitter facilities near Missouri City, in unincorporated northeastern Fort Bend County.

== History ==
The station was originally licensed to Galveston Educational TV, Inc. under the call sign KUYA; it is unknown whether the station ever went on the air under those call letters.

On July 20, 1989, Eldred Thomas moved the KLTJ religious programming inventory and call sign from channel 57 (frequency now occupied by KUBE-TV) to channel 22 to take advantage of an improved coverage area.

Before moving the call letters to Houston, Thomas owned KLTJ (channel 49, now KSTR-DT) in Dallas from 1983 to 1987; it was a sister station to radio outlet KVTT-FM (now KKXT), which Thomas also owned.

== Technical information ==
=== Subchannels ===
The station's signal is multiplexed:

Subchannels of KLTJ
Subchannel	Res.	Short name	Programming
22.1	1080i	KLTJ-DT	Daystar
22.2	720p	KLTJ-ES	Daystar Español
22.3	480i	KLTJ-SD	Daystar Reflections

=== Analog-to-digital conversion ===
KLTJ ended regular programming on its analog signal, over UHF channel 22, on June 12, 2009, the official date on which full-power television stations in the United States transitioned from analog to digital broadcasts under federal mandate. The station's digital signal remained on its pre-transition UHF channel 23, using virtual channel 22.
