= Channel 22 TV stations in Mexico =

The following television stations broadcast on digital or analog channel 22 in Mexico:

- XEQ-TDT in Mexico City
- XHACH-TDT in Arivechi, Sonora
- XHACZ-TDT in Acapulco, Guerrero
- XHALM-TDT in Álamos, Sonora
- XHAN-TDT in Campeche, Campeche
- XHAPS-TDT in Agua Prieta, Sonora
- XHCDC-TDT in Ciudad del Carmen, Campeche
- XHCDI-TDT in Matehuala, San Luis Potosí
- XHCH-TDT in Chihuahua, Chihuahua
- XHCLP-TDT in San Luis Potosí, San Luis Potosí
- XHCMU-TDT in Ciudad Mante, Tamaulipas
- XHCRP-TDT on Cerro Corral de Piedra, Oaxaca
- XHCTCN-TDT in Cancún, Quintana Roo
- XHCTLP-TDT in La Paz, Baja California Sur
- XHCTMD-TDT in Mérida, Yucatán
- XHCTMY-TDT in Monterrey, Nuevo León
- XHCTNY-TDT in Tepic, Nayarit
- XHCTRM-TDT in Reynosa and Matamoros, Tamaulipas
- XHCUV-TDT in Cuernavaca, Morelos
- XHCZC-TDT in Comitán de Domínguez, Chiapas
- XHDU-TDT in Zihuatanejo, Guerrero
- XHFZC-TDT in Zacatecas, Zacatecas
- XHGUE-TDT in Guadalajara, Jalisco
- XHGVC-TDT in Coatzacoalcos, Veracruz
- XHGXI-TDT in Xichu, Guanajuato
- XHHDP-TDT in Hidalgo del Parral, Chihuahua
- XHIXM-TDT in Ixmiquilpan, Hidalgo
- XHJZA-TDT in Juchitán de Zaragoza, Oaxaca
- XHJZT-TDT in Jalpa, Zacatecas
- XHMZI-TDT in Zitácuaro, Michoacán de Ocampo
- XHNCZ-TDT in Nacozari, Sonora
- XHNEA-TDT in Teotitlan de Flores Magón, Oaxaca
- XHPAC-TDT in Parras de la Fuente, Coahuila
- XHPDT-TDT in Puerto Peñasco, Sonora
- XHPMG-TDT in La Piedad, Michoacán
- XHRCSP-TDT in Santiago Papasquiaro, Durango
- XHSDP-TDT in San Pedro Pochutla, Oaxaca
- XHSIB-TDT in San Isidro, Baja California Sur
- XHSPM-TDT in San Pablo del Monte, Tlaxcala
- XHSPO-TDT in Torreón, Coahuila
- XHSPT-TDT in San Pedro Tapanatepec, Oaxaca
- XHSXL-TDT in Santiago Juxtlahuaca, Oaxaca
- XHTCA-TDT in Tecomán, Colima
- XHTUH-TDT in Tulancingo, Hidalgo
- XHTXB-TDT in Apizaco, Tlaxcala
- XHUAA-TDT in Tijuana, Baja California
- XHUAD-TDT in Durango, Durango
- XHUJZ-TDT in Huautla de Jiménez, Oaxaca
- XHVAZ-TDT in Valparaíso, Zacatecas
- XHVEL-TDT in Cuéncame, Durango

== See also ==
- Channel 22 virtual TV stations in Mexico
