= TV2 (U.S. Virgin Islands) =

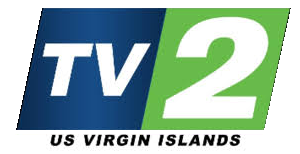
- United States Virgin Islands
- Channels: Analog: 4 (Viya); Digital: 504 (HD)

Programming
- Affiliations: Independent (2000–2009, 2018–present)

Ownership
- Owner: Innovative Communications Corporation

History
- First air date: 2000
- Former affiliations: CBS (2009–2018)

Technical information
- Translator(s): WMNS-LD 22 (UHF), Charlotte Amalie

TV2 is a cable-only TV channel available on Innovative Cable TV in the United States Virgin Islands. TV2 picked up the CBS network on July 13, 2009, just two weeks after WVXF, the area's previous CBS affiliate, switched from CBS to This TV. TV2's schedule consists entirely of local and syndicated programming.

TV2 was also available over-the-air on WMNS-LD until September 20, 2023.

== Programming ==
TV2's programming lineup includes a local news program, News 2 and other local programs.

- Save More VI
- VI Ambassadors
- Best Bites
- Island Showcase
- 21 Questions
- Island Weather Report

== Logos ==
Former TV2 logo as a CBS affiliate.
