= KPXP =

Radio station in Garapan, Saipan, Northern Mariana Islands

- Garapan-Saipan, Northern Mariana Islands; United States
- Broadcast area: Northern Mariana Islands
- Frequency: 97.9 MHz
- Branding: Power 99 FM

Programming
- Format: Adult Album Alternative

Ownership
- Owner: Sorensen Pacific Broadcasting Inc.
- Sister stations: KZGU

History
- First air date: May 31, 1991 (as KRSI)
- Former call signs: KRSI (1991-2014)

Technical information
- Licensing authority: FCC
- Facility ID: 54766
- Class: C1
- ERP: 6,500 watts
- HAAT: 455 meters (1,493 feet)
- Transmitter coordinates: 15°11′6″N 145°44′30″E

Links
- Public license information: Public file; LMS
- Website: www.sorensenmediagroup.com/power99

KPXP, (97.9 FM). branded as "Power 99 FM", is a radio station broadcasting an Adult Album Alternative music format. Licensed to Garapan-Saipan, Northern Mariana Islands, the station is currently owned by Sorensen Pacific Broadcasting Inc.

The station was assigned the KRSI call letters by the Federal Communications Commission on May 31, 1991. The call sign was changed to the current KPXP on May 12, 2014, when the former KPXP on 99.5 (now KZGU) moved from the Northern Mariana Islands to Guam. The new KPXP inherited the station's name and format, explaining its use of the Power 99 name while being on 97.9 MHz.
