= WWBI-LP =

Television station in Plattsburgh, New York (1992–2007)

- A WWBI-LP station ID used during the 1990s.

Plattsburgh, New York; Burlington, Vermont; United States
- City: Plattsburgh, New York
- Channels: Analog: 27 (UHF)

Ownership
- Owner: SMC Communications

History
- Founded: January 28, 1992
- First air date: December 14, 1992
- Last air date: July 2007
- Former call signs: W27BI (1992–1996)
- Former affiliations: Independent (1992–1995); UPN (1995–1999); Ion Television (1999–January 2006 and October 2006–2007); Daystar (secondary 2005–January 2006, primary January–October 2006)
- Call sign meaning: Derived from old translator calls "W27BI"

Technical information
- ERP: 44.7 kW
- Translator(s): W14CK Newport, Vermont

WWBI-LP (channel 27) was a low-power television station in Plattsburgh, New York, United States. Owned by SMC Communications, it was last affiliated with Ion Television.

WWBI was licensed as a Class A station, even though the calls list it as an "-LP"; this was the case with many other stations licensed prior to 1999, when the Federal Communications Commission (FCC) began to assign the "-CA" suffix for Class A licenses.

== History ==
WWBI-LP signed on December 14, 1992, as an independent station. The station originally had plans to become the Fox affiliate for the Burlington, Vermont–Plattsburgh, New York market and Montreal, but negotiations failed and the station adopted the UPN affiliation in 1995. However, three stations in the Burlington-Plattsburgh changed affiliation in May 1999: UPN moved to former WB station WBVT-LP, The WB moved to Fox station WFFF-TV as a secondary affiliate, and WWBI initially went independent before switching to Ion (then known as Pax TV). Some of its programming included The Jerry Springer Show and WWF/E Jakked/Metal.

Word of God Fellowship, Inc., parent company of the Daystar Television Network, reached an agreement to purchase WWBI-LP in the fall of 2005; the station began running Daystar programming under a local marketing agreement (LMA) by the end of the year. There was originally word that the station would run Daystar programming part-time while keeping some programming from i: Independent Television (which Pax had become in July 2005) as part of the schedule, however, by at least as of January 2006, it changed over to full-time Daystar (religious) programming. Following this, WWBI was replaced by the i satellite feed on local cable systems, who were never obligated to carry WWBI in the first place since it is a low power station.

In October 2006, however, WWBI's sale to Daystar had fallen through; as a result, the station once again returned to programming from the i network (which became Ion in January 2007) and returned to local cable systems by mid-November 2006.

On June 6, 2006, WWBI's former studio, the Hotel Holland in Rouses Point, New York, was destroyed in a fire. The Hotel Holland was used for WWBI's studios back in the days when they were an independent station and UPN affiliate, and when the fire occurred, was used as storage for broadcasting equipment after relocating their studios.

Since July 2007, WWBI's signal had been off the air. Its license expired on June 1, 2007, and was not renewed. As of March 29, 2011, WWBI's license has been canceled and its call sign deleted by the FCC.

WWBI's cable slots have been replaced with the national Ion feed. Also, for over-the-air viewers within WWBI's former viewing area, Gray Television has added a 16:9 standard definition feed of the Ion Television service to the fifth digital subchannel of CBS affiliate WCAX-TV (channel 3).

== Translator ==
WWBI operated one translator, W14CK in Newport, Vermont, which was added in 1997; this station's transmitter was located atop Jay Peak. Like the parent station, W14CK, despite being a translator and being assigned a translator call sign, was licensed as a Class A station.

W14CK's license remained active (as that station did file for license renewal); however, it was downgraded from Class A status and reverted to the standard low-power repeater class on October 24, 2012, due to failure to file E/I children's television reports. On June 12, 2015, W14CK's license was canceled by the FCC for failure to file a license renewal application.

== Viewership in Quebec ==
On the Vidéotron cable system in Montreal, WWBI-LP was "seen" on its Illico digital service between January 2004 and July 2005, but citing "technical difficulties", was the national Pax satellite feed instead. These problems were never corrected, and WWBI-LP was withdrawn from the service by orders from the Canadian Radio-television and Telecommunications Commission (CRTC).

Usually, the main WWBI signal only reached the international border, though many in the Montreal area have managed to pull the signal in, with varying results. (Its translator, W14CK, extended into Quebec's Estrie region, although this is mainly farmland and backcountry.)

== See also ==
- List of television stations in Vermont
