= Channel 22 TV stations in Canada =

The following television stations broadcast on digital or analog channel 22 in Canada:

- CHAN-DT in Vancouver, British Columbia
- CHCH-DT-1 in Ottawa, Ontario
- CHEX-TV-2 in Oshawa, Ontario
- CHKL-DT-2 in Vernon, British Columbia
- CHKM-DT in Kamloops, British Columbia
- CIII-DT-22 in Stevenson, Ontario
- CIVB-DT in Rimouski, Quebec
- VX9AMK at Toronto
