= KUAM-FM =

Radio station in Hagåtña, Guam

Agana, Guam; Guam
- Broadcast area: Guam
- Frequency: 93.9 MHz
- Branding: Breeze 93.9

Programming
- Format: Adult contemporary

Ownership
- Owner: Pacific Telestations, LLC
- Sister stations: KUAM-TV, KUAM-LP

History
- First air date: September 1, 1966

Technical information
- Licensing authority: FCC
- Facility ID: 51236
- Class: C2
- ERP: 5,200 watts
- HAAT: 289 meters (948 ft)
- Transmitter coordinates: 13.432994°N 144.712687°E

Links
- Public license information: Public file; LMS
- Website: https://www.kuam.com

KUAM-FM (93.9 FM) branded as Breeze 93.9 is a radio station broadcasting from the village of Dededo in the United States territory of Guam. The station broadcasts an adult contemporary music format.

The station is owned by Pacific Telestations, LLC (a company of the local conglomerate Calvo Enterprises, Inc.) and is the sister station to KUAM-TV and KUAM-LP. It is also Guam's first FM station, having signed on the air on September 1, 1966, known as FM94 and 94 Rock. In the 1990s they were known as 94 Jamz, "The People's Station".

In early 2000s the station's moniker became i94, "Guam's Favorite".

On July 23, 2020, it was announced that KUAM would flip to an adult contemporary format as Breeze 93.9 on July 27.
