= WTOO-CD =

Television station in Johnstown, Pennsylvania

- Johnstown, Pennsylvania; United States
- Channels: Digital: 22 (UHF); Virtual: 50

Programming
- Affiliations: 50.1: Heroes & Icons; for others, see § Subchannels

Ownership
- Owner: Sonshine Family Television; (Zebra Media, LLC)

History
- Former call signs: W32AX (1990–2004); WTOO-CA (2004–2015)
- Former channel numbers: Analog: 32 (UHF, 1997–2003), 50 (UHF, 2003–2015); Digital: 23 (UHF, 2015–2020)
- Former affiliations: HSN
- Call sign meaning: Altoona

Technical information
- Licensing authority: FCC
- Facility ID: 68403
- Class: CD
- ERP: 15 kW
- HAAT: 323.8 m (1,062 ft)
- Transmitter coordinates: 40°22′15.8″N 78°59′2.1″W

Links
- Public license information: Public file; LMS

WTOO-CD (channel 50) is a low-power, Class A television station in Johnstown, Pennsylvania, United States, affiliated with the digital multicast network Heroes & Icons. Owned by Sonshine Family Television, it is a sister station to Bethlehem, Pennsylvania–based WBPH-TV (channel 60). WTOO-CD's transmitter is located northwest of Johnstown, Pennsylvania in Laurel Ridge State Park along the Cambria–Westmoreland county line.

== History ==
WTOO-CD was owned by Benjamin Perez of Abacus Television until it was sold, along with four other TV stations, to Fifth Street Enterprises LLC in April 2015.

On April 12, 2021, it was announced that WTOO-CD would be sold to Zebra Media, a sister company to Sonshine Family Television, for $450,000; the sale was completed on June 1.

== Subchannels ==
The station's signal is multiplexed:

Subchannels of WTOO-CD
Channel	Res.	Short name	Programming
50.1	480i	WTOO-CD	Heroes & Icons
50.2	480i	StartTV	Start TV
50.3	480i	Catchy	Catchy Comedy
50.4	480i	Movies	Movies!
50.5	480i	Story	Story Television
50.6	480i	MeTOONS	MeTV Toons
50.7	480i	WBPH	Simulcast of WBPH-TV / Religious
