= KEQI-LD =

Television station in Dededo, Guam

Translator of KTGM, Tamuning, Guam

- Dededo; Guam
- Channels: Digital: 22 (UHF); Virtual: 14
- Branding: ABC 7 (14.1, cable channel); Fox 6 (14.2); Guam News Now

Programming
- Affiliations: 14.1: ABC; 14.2: Fox

Ownership
- Owner: Lilly Broadcasting; (Guam Broadcasting, LLC)
- Sister stations: KTGM

History
- First air date: December 17, 2004
- Former call signs: K22GD (2001–2004); KEQI-LP (2004–2021)
- Former channel numbers: Analog: 22 (UHF, 2005–2015)
- Former affiliations: Independent (2004–2005)
- Call sign meaning: "Equal Information"

Technical information
- Licensing authority: FCC
- Facility ID: 125527
- Class: LD
- ERP: 1.95 kW
- HAAT: 10.7 m (35 ft)
- Transmitter coordinates: 13°29′17″N 144°49′30″E

Links
- Public license information: LMS
- Website: guamnewsnow.com

KEQI-LD (channel 22) is a low-power television station in Dededo, Guam, serving the U.S. territory. It is a translator of ABC/Fox affiliate KTGM (channel 14) which is owned by Lilly Broadcasting. KEQI-LD's transmitter is located in the heights of Barigåda (Barrigada), Guam; master control and most internal operations are based at Lilly Broadcasting's headquarters on State Street in downtown Erie, Pennsylvania.

== Programming ==
Originally KEQI-LP, the station signed on the air on December 17, 2004, and has been owned by Sorensen Media Group since its inception. It broadcast as an independent station until picking up the Fox network affiliation on September 1, 2005. Prior to this, Fox had only been carried as a secondary affiliation, first on NBC affiliate KUAM-TV, then on KTGM (which Sorensen acquired in November 2005) from 1990 onward, until near the end of the decade, when KTGM dropped it to focus on ABC programming. After this, local cable systems carried San Francisco Bay Area affiliate KTVU before the network affiliated with KEQI-LP.

The station aired a mix of Fox network programming and syndicated fare. It also aired the Fox prime time schedule on the same week as the continental United States, except that shows were aired on a Tuesday-through-Monday pattern rather than the Monday-through-Sunday pattern, since Guam is a day ahead of the United States. This did not apply to live sports, which mainly aired live early in the morning.

In 2008, the station added news programming from the Philippines, using content from ABS-CBN and its sister news cable channel ANC through The Filipino Channel, throughout the day when they did not air any Fox programming. KEQI-LD also aired radio simulcasts of several KGUM talk shows with live studio cams.

KTGM and KEQI-LD's transmitting facilities and studios were heavily damaged by May 2023's Typhoon Mawar, and the stations were forced off the air. On June 1, 2023, Lilly Broadcasting obtained the ABC and Fox affiliations for Guam, keeping the networks' programming available on local cable providers. Sorensen was able to return KTGM to the air intermittently, though insurance litigation and reduced advertising revenues put financial pressure on the company and it ceased operations again on October 30. The station was also evicted from its studios for failure to pay rent. On February 18, 2025, Sorensen determined there was no possible way to return KTGM and KEQI-LD to operation and applied for cancellation of their licenses. Lilly countered with an offer to buy the two licenses and reconstruct their transmitting facilities. This would be contingent on obtaining a waiver of Section 312(g) of the Communications Act of 1934, which requires the Federal Communications Commission (FCC) to cancel the license of any station that has been silent for one year. However, the commission has a precedent of granting waivers to stations which have gone silent due to natural disasters.

== Subchannel ==
The station's signal is multiplexed:

Subchannels of KTGM and KEQI-LD
| Subchannel | Res. | Short name | Programming |
|---|---|---|---|
| 14.1 | 720p | ABC7 | ABC |
| 14.2 | 720p | FOX6 | Fox |

Subchannel broadcast with MPEG-4 video

== See also ==
- Channel 6 branded TV stations in the United States
- Channel 22 digital TV stations in the United States
- Channel 22 low-power TV stations in the United States
- Channel 22 virtual TV stations in the United States
