= KTGM =

Television station in Tamuning, Guam

- Tamuning–Hagåtña; Guam
- City: Tamuning, Guam
- Channels: Digital: 14 (UHF); Virtual: 14
- Branding: ABC 7 (14.1, cable channel); Fox 6 (14.2); Guam News Now

Programming
- Affiliations: 14.1: ABC; 14.2: Fox

Ownership
- Owner: Lilly Broadcasting; (Guam Broadcasting, LLC)

History
- First air date: October 29, 1984
- Former call signs: K14AM (1984–1987)
- Former channel numbers: Analog: 14 (UHF, 1987–2009); Digital: 17 (UHF, 2002–2009)
- Former affiliations: Multicultural independent (1984–1985); CNN (1985−1987); CBS (secondary, 1987–1995); Fox (secondary, 1990−1999); The WB (secondary, 2001–2005)
- Call sign meaning: Tamuning, Guam (city of license); -or-; Television in Guam

Technical information
- Licensing authority: FCC
- Facility ID: 29232
- ERP: 12.5 kW
- HAAT: 168 m (551 ft)
- Transmitter coordinates: 13°29′20.9″N 144°49′41″E
- Translator(s): KEQI-LD 22 Dededo; K28HS-D 28 Hagåtña

Links
- Public license information: Public file; LMS
- Website: guamnewsnow.com

KTGM (channel 14, cable channel 7) is a television station in Tamuning, Guam, serving the U.S. territory as an affiliate of ABC and Fox. The station is owned by Lilly Broadcasting. KTGM's transmitter is located in the heights of Barigåda (Barrigada), Guam; master control and most internal operations are based at Lilly Broadcasting's headquarters on State Street in downtown Erie, Pennsylvania.

KEQI-LD (channel 22) is a low-power translator of KTGM.

== History ==
The FCC opened an application for UHF channel 14 on September 24, 1982, the first low power application in Guam. Guahan Airwaves got its bid approved in November 1983 and had until November 9, 1984 to start its transmissions.

K14AM signed on the air at 7 p.m. on October 29, 1984, owned by Guahan Airwaves, with facilities at the Atlantica Guam building in Upper Tumon, under the callsign K14AM. broadcasting on NTSC analog channel 14. It was Guam's second commercial TV station after KUAM-TV had signed on 28 years prior, and the first TV station of any kind on Guam in nearly 14 years since PBS member KGTF's sign on. Initially an independent operation carrying multilingual programming to cater to the island's diverse ethnicities in addition to hoteliers and telecommunications workers, as well as classic movies in English, in July 1985 it started adding CNN programming in late August 1985 after an agreement signed in early July. In 1986, it held a two-way satellite link with the Japanese public broadcaster NHK, the first involving the territory. That same year, it started relaying sports coverage live by satellite. By April 1987, K14AM (TV14) had carried CNN all day long.

The pre-existing format as a news channel began to pose economic challenges; with limited local insertion opportunities within the CNN cable schedule, advertising sales proved to be insufficient. The news department that was set up as an independent station was shutting down per an announcement made in May 1987. It resumed operations on October 24, 1987, after being off the air on cable for seven weeks, this time under the callsign KTGM, which is still in use. KTGM continued to carry CNN programming; by early 1988, the station had become a primary ABC affiliate, by the time of its coverage of Super Bowl XXII and the 1988 Winter Olympics, but in the beginning also had a secondary CBS affiliation, which it shared with KUAM-TV.

KTGM added Fox programming in 1990, after being dropped by KUAM-TV and also carried some CNN programming. It was also the first television station in Guam to broadcast in stereo, becoming the sixtieth ABC affiliate overall to do so. At the time of the launch of such service, 10 1/2 hours of programming were in "true" stereo, while the rest was in synthesized stereo. CBS was dropped in 1995 after KUAM-LP signed on. Fox was dropped as well by the end of the 1990s, shifting its focus to ABC programming, after which Fox was only available on cable via San Francisco Bay Area affiliate KTVU until 2005, when KEQI-LP picked up the affiliation. Between June 2001 and November 2005, KTGM also carried WB programming (previously carried by KUAM-LP).

KTGM used to be located on the third floor of the Atlantica Building at 692 North Marine Drive (now known as Marine Corps Drive) in Upper Tumon (Municipality of Tamuning). Due to the building's ownership issues, KTGM moved to a commercial building on Route 16 (now known as Army Drive) in Barrigada Heights in 2003.

In 2001, the station also launched a repeater, KPPI-LP, in Garapan, Saipan, Northern Mariana Islands, on VHF channel 7. The station started off as K07XG (November 19, 2001 – December 17, 2004), before gaining the callsign of KPPI-LP (December 17, 2004 – March 28, 2005). It was deleted for three days (as DKPPI-LP, from March 28 to 31, 2005), before being reinstated as KPPI-LP on March 31, 2005. It is the first and only broadcast station in Saipan since the shutdown of WSZE in 1980. The station was licensed for digital operation as KPPI-LD on VHF channel 7 effective March 21, 2022.

Originally owned and operated by Island Broadcasting, Inc., KTGM was purchased by Sorensen Media Group (then owner of five radio stations on Guam and Saipan, and now additionally three TV stations) in November 2005. Soon after, it moved its cable channel position from 14 to 7, hence the current station branding. In 2009, Sorensen moved the station's facilities, along with its sister stations, from Barrigada Heights to Hagåtña.

In 2008, KTGM apparently had its DTV construction permit expire, and was waiting for the FCC to reinstate it, which it did later that year. On February 18, 2009, KTGM officially signed off its analog channel at 2 p.m. Chamorro Standard Time (6 p.m. HST/8 p.m. PST/11 p.m. EST on February 17, 2009) and switched on its ATSC digital channel 14.

=== Typhoons, crisis and sale ===
KTGM and KEQI-LD's transmitting facilities and studios were heavily damaged by May 2023's Typhoon Mawar, and the stations were forced off the air. On June 1 and September 2023, Lilly Broadcasting obtained the ABC and Fox affiliations for Guam respectively, keeping the networks' programming available on local cable providers. Sorensen was able to return KTGM to the air intermittently, though insurance litigation and reduced advertising revenues put financial pressure on the company and it ceased operations again on October 30. The station was also evicted from its studios for failure to pay rent.

On October 11, 2023, KTGM's translator in Saipan, KPPI-LD, also went silent as result of damages caused by Typhoon Bolaven on its transmitter at Mount Tapochau and the power line. Sorensen subsequently agreed to sell KPPI-LD to DB Media, LLC on December 13, 2023 for $200.000. The buyer, who also acquired KZMI's licensee Holonet Corporation on that year, also assumed the operations of the low-powered station under a Time brokerage agreement. The transaction was completed on March 11, 2024.

On February 18, 2025, Sorensen determined there was no possible way to return KTGM and KEQI-LD to operation and applied for cancellation of their licenses. Lilly countered with an offer to buy the two licenses and reconstruct their transmitting facilities. This would be contingent on obtaining a waiver of Section 312(g) of the Communications Act of 1934, which requires the Federal Communications Commission (FCC) to cancel the license of any station that has been silent for one year. However, the commission has a precedent of granting waivers to stations which have gone silent due to natural disasters.

On September 25, 2025, Sorensen filed to sell both stations to Lilly's Guam Broadcasting, LLC, pending FCC approval, for $100,000 in cash and the assumption of all attorney's fees and expenses incurred in connection with the transaction. The letter agreement was made on May 15 by the buyer and signed by seller on August 21. After KTGM resumed operations on October 31, 2025, the FCC approved the sale on January 6, 2026 and it was completed on February 27.

== Programming and schedule ==
Because Guam is a day ahead of the continental United States and that most programs arrived by tapes from California, KTGM used to air most ABC shows (except those available through satellites) on a one-week delay basis. When KTGM carried WB programming, it was aired from 6 to 8 p.m. directly before ABC's prime time schedule, also on a one-week delay.

With advancing communication technology, KTGM then aired the complete ABC lineup on the "same day" (just a few hours behind Hawaii), meaning that a Monday through Sunday stateside pattern was aired on a Tuesday through Monday pattern on Guam due to the time zone and day-ahead hindrance. ABC's sports programs were aired with less delay, and often in the middle of the night, Guam time; some sporting events that air live in prime time often air in the late-morning hours in Guam. For example, Monday Night Football, now starting at 8:15 p.m. Eastern, kicks off on KTGM at 10:15 a.m. Chamorro Time on Tuesday morning, leading into the daytime soap General Hospital.

From 2005 until 2009, KTGM repeated ABC Kids programming throughout the week within their daytime schedule.

== News and weather ==
As a CNN affiliate, it produced Newscenter 14, which aired on weeknights at 7 p.m. with a repeat at 11 p.m. Newscenter 14 ended its run as the station was reconverting to an ABC affiliate due to the station's financial situation in mid-1987.

KTGM broadcast hourly weather segments from what it dubbed the "ABC14 WeatherCenter" between January 1999 and December 2002. (It was never revived after Super Typhoon Pongsona.)

The merger with Sorensen allowed KTGM to share resources with Sorensen's radio stations, and thus allowed the K57 (KGUM) news operations (which took on the name "Pacific News Center") to expand into television. KTGM's half-hour evening news began broadcasting in summer 2005, ending KUAM's monopoly of local TV news since 1998. The PNC TV news was broadcast live nightly at 6 p.m., then rebroadcast on KEQI-LD at 7 and 10:30 p.m., as well as on KTGM after ABC prime time programming at 10 p.m.

When Lilly Broadcasting assumed the ABC affiliation in Guam on June 1, 2023, it was launched a Guam-focused newscast, produced from the WSEE-TV/WICU-TV studios in Erie, Pennsylvania and airing at 6 and 10 p.m. on a Tuesday through Saturday pattern. It was subsequently rebranded as Guam News Now when the company obtained the Fox affiliation for the U.S. territory.

== Subchannels ==
The station's signal is multiplexed:

Subchannels of KTGM and KEQI-LD
Subchannel	Res.	Short name	Programming
14.1	720p	ABC7	ABC
14.2	720p	FOX6	Fox

Subchannel broadcast with MPEG-4 video

== See also ==
- Channel 7 branded TV stations in the United States
- Channel 14 digital TV stations in the United States
- Channel 14 virtual TV stations in the United States
