= KGUM (AM) =

Radio station in Hagåtña, Guam

KGUM AM
- Hagåtña, Guam; Guam
- Broadcast area: Guam
- Frequency: 96.5 kHz
- Branding: Mix 96

Programming
- Language: English
- Format: News/Talk radio
- Affiliations: Podcast Guam Guam Digital Digest

Ownership
- Owner: PK Entertainment; (Kyle Mandapat)

History
- First air date: February 1975 (as KATB)
- Former call signs: KATB (1975-1981)
- Former names: News Talk K57 K57
- Former frequencies: 567 kHz (1975–2023)
- Call sign meaning: Guam

Technical information
- Licensing authority: FCC
- Facility ID: 60853
- Class: B
- Power: 10,000 watts (unlimited)
- Transmitter coordinates: 13°23′28″N 144°45′42″E
- Translator: 96.5 K243CS (Agana)

Links
- Public license information: AM Public file; LMS
- Webcast: mix96now.com
- Website: Mix96now.com

KGUM (567 AM) is a radio station licensed to serve the community of Hagåtña, Guam.

Formerly owned by Sorensen Media Group, now owned by PK Entertainment, it broadcasts a modern millennium format branded as Mix 96. Although KGUM broadcasts on 567 kHz, most U.S. radios tune in 10 kHz increments only; the station has thus marketed itself as being on the next nearest frequency, 570 on the AM dial, and 96 on the FM side via the translator. Stations in Guam fall within the jurisdiction of the Geneva Frequency Plan of 1975, instead of the North American Regional Broadcasting Agreement used in the U.S. mainland and Hawaii.

The station was purchased and reassigned in the fall of 2025 following a long period of being off the air following Super Typhoon Mawar on Guam.

== History ==
KATB went on the air in February 1975. It was owned by Magof, Inc., a company of A. T. Bordallo. Bordallo died in 1977, and the station was transferred to his estate. K-57 Radio bought the station in 1981, relaunching it as K57 Radio with the new callsign of KGUM. Four years later, KGUM began using the name News Talk K57.

In 1992, KGUM began broadcasting with 10,000 watts.

A storm knocked down KGUM's tower in January 2016, requiring the station to broadcast under special temporary authority with 5,000 watts.

On October 12, 2023, Sorensen Media Group opted to enter into a management agreement with Glimpses Media, and after a lot of speculation about the station's future. On the next day, radio station signed off together with sister stations KGUM-FM, KZGU and KZGZ, due to format changes.

In 2025, former Sorensen Media Group Vice-president of Radio Operations and longtime radio programmer and talent on Guam, Kyle Mandapat, purchased the station from SMG.

The station returned to the air under the new brand Mix 96 in November of 2025 and featured a full holiday format.

In February 2026, Mandapat, who was the Head of Radio Operations for Glimpses Media at the time, vacated his position and decided to pursue an independent station stratergy alongside radio partner Reese "The Beast" Espinosa.

The group officially entered the local radio landscape with the launch of the new format and the slogan, "Guam's Best Mix."

== Programming ==
On March 15, 2026, Mix 96 officially launched its live programming schedule featuring The Morning Blender with Kyle Mandapat and Reese The Beast. The show runs from 6am to 9am every weekday and emanates from the PKE studios in Tumon, Guam.
