= KZGZ =

Radio station in Hagåtña, Guam

Power 98 (KZGZ)
- Hagåtña; Guam
- Broadcast area: Guam
- Frequency: 97.5 MHz
- Branding: Power 98

Programming
- Format: Rhythmic CHR

Ownership
- Owner: Glimpses Media
- Sister stations: KGUM-FM

History
- First air date: February 23, 1993

Technical information
- Licensing authority: FCC
- Class: C1
- ERP: 37,000 watts MAX: 38,000 watts
- HAAT: 197 meters
- Transmitter coordinates: 13.489167°N 144.828056°E

Links
- Public license information: Public file; LMS
- Website: http://www.power98.com

KZGZ (97.5 FM) — branded as Power 98 — is a radio station licensed to Hagåtña, Guam. It is owned and operated by Glimpses Media and airs a rhythmic-leaning contemporary hit radio format.
