= KWBJ-CD =

Television station in Morgan City, Louisiana

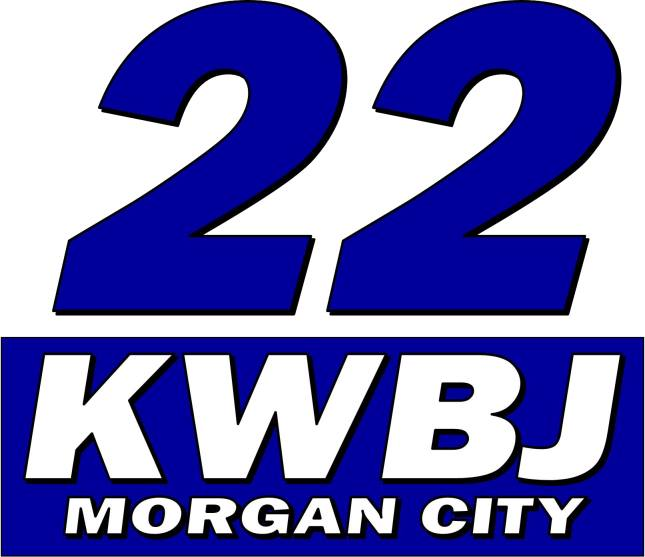
- Morgan City, Louisiana; United States
- Channels: Digital: 22 (UHF); Virtual: 22
- Branding: KWBJ TV 22 (general); KWBJ News (newscasts)

Programming
- Affiliations: 22.1: YTA TV

Ownership
- Owner: Price Media Corporation

History
- First air date: 1978 (cable only); April 2, 1990 (as a stand-alone station)
- Former call signs: ATVC Channel 7 (April 1986–1990); K39BJ (1990–1996); KWBJ-LP (1996–2009)
- Former channel numbers: Analog: 39 (UHF, 1990–2009)
- Former affiliations: Independent (1987–1995); The WB (1995–2006); America One (secondary 1999–2006; primary 2006–2015)
- Call sign meaning: The WB (former affiliation)

Technical information
- Licensing authority: FCC
- Facility ID: 24218
- Class: CD
- ERP: 15 kW
- HAAT: 58.4 m (192 ft)
- Transmitter coordinates: 29°43′15.7″N 91°12′18.4″W

Links
- Public license information: Public file; LMS

KWBJ-CD (channel 22) is a low-power, Class A television station in Morgan City, Louisiana, United States, affiliated with YTA TV. The station is owned by the Price Media Corporation. KWBJ-CD's studios are located on Michigan Street/US 90/LA 182, and its transmitter is located on Shaw Street (northeast of Jimmy Magee Park) in Morgan City.

== History ==
KWBJ originated as a cable-only channel known as ATVC Channel 7, which launched in 1978. It was managed by Allen's TV Cable, owned by Allen Price, which has served the Morgan City area since the 1960s, and it carried local programs and special events for the Morgan City and St. Mary Parish area, before serving as a full-fledged cable channel in April 1986. Among its original programs was a newscast known as Newslook 7. On April 2, 1990, Allen's TV Cable brought the station over the air as K39BJ, broadcasting on UHF channel 39. Serving Morgan City, Houma, and the southern part of the Baton Rouge market, it originally operated as an independent station. In early 1996, K39BJ became a charter affiliate of The WB Television Network; in September of that year, the station changed its call letters to KWBJ-LP to reflect its new affiliation. The station began carrying programming from America One as a secondary affiliation in 1999.

On January 24, 2006, CBS Corporation (which split from Viacom in December 2005) and Time Warner's Warner Bros. Entertainment (the division that operated The WB) announced that they would dissolve UPN and The WB, and move some of their programming to a newly created network, The CW. One month later on February 22, 2006, News Corporation announced the launch of a competing "sixth" network called MyNetworkTV, which would be operated by Fox Television Stations and its syndication division Twentieth Television. KWBJ-LP opted against seeking an affiliation with either The CW or MyNetworkTV, instead opting to become a part-time America One affiliate while continuing to carry general entertainment programs interspersed within the network's programming. KWBJ became a YouToo America affiliate once America One folded into that network.

KWBJ's coverage over the air and via cable is limited to St. Mary, lower Assumption, and lower St. Martin parishes; the station is not available over the air or on cable or satellite in the Baton Rouge, New Orleans or Lafayette metro areas. Per its co-ownership with Allen's TV Cable, which provides cable service to the Morgan City area, KWBJ is not carried by any other providers in that area that compete with Allen's TV Cable.

== Local programming ==
Since 2017, KWBJ has produced a local current affairs interview program, branded The Voice of the Coast; the half-hour show airs weeknights at 6:30 p.m. and is repeated at 9 p.m. and 8 a.m. the next day. The station also airs local weather updates produced by WeatherVision, during syndicated programming on its evening schedule. Prior to 2017, KWBJ aired a 30-minute newscast. The station also produces South Louisiana Quiz Bowl, an academic competition for area high schools and junior high schools.

== South Louisiana Quiz Bowl ==
South Louisiana Quiz Bowl (SLQB) is one of the most popular programs the network has aired alongside Voice of the Coast . On the KWBJ YouTube Channel (KWBJ Live), Many of the most popular videos are matches from the Academic Competition. Schools from Parishes such as, Terrebonne, Lafourche, Saint Mary, Assumption, Iberia, and Saint Martin, have all competed in the tournament. The station hosts Varsity and Junior Varsity tournaments.

== The Mystery of Montegut Middle School's Junior Varsity Dominance (25-26 South Louisiana Quiz Bowl Tournament) ==
During the 2025-2026 South Louisiana Quiz Bowl Tourney, Montegut Middle School's team went undefeated in the Tournament of 34 teams. The Dolphins, led by their dominant captain Eli Picou, never Lost a Single match. The teams dominance was palpable. Almost every match was a blowout. Here is a list of players from this dominant team:

- Eli Picou: Captain (Highest Scorer on the Team. Had Played 2 Tourney's before. In these two other Tourneys Montegut had placed 4th and 3rd.)
- Ezra [Last Name Undefined] (2nd Highest Scoring on this Team)
- Brayden [Last Name Undefined] (Vital Asset for the Team)
- Ryvers [Last Name Undefined] (Vital Asset for the Team)
- Olivia [Last Name Undefined] (Most Reliable Alternate)
- Luke [Last Name Undefined] (Reliable Alternate)
- Brynlee [Last Name Undefined] (Only was put in once, answered no questions)

=== Montegut Middle's Championship Berth ===
In the closest game of the season for Montegut, they won the championship match in 2nd matchup against Houma Junior High. The Score was 58-45. This was the first championship in the long history of Montegut Middle's Quiz Bowl Program. After the match, Picou addressed a short victory speech towards his friends, his peers, his former teammates, teachers, and the populace of Montegut/Bourg/Point-Aux-Chenes/etc. He spoke in a light Cajun accent said:

"To quote the great general, Napoleon Bonaparte, I'd like to say 'Victory belongs to the most persevering.' And Montegut Middle has persevered the whole time I was on this team and I'd just like to say thank you to everyone who's ever been on the team while I was on it."

For the 26-27 Junior Varsity Tourney, Montegut has not fielded a team. Though South Terrebonne (The High School Where Many Montegut Middle students funnel into) has fielded it's team. Eli is present this season for South Terrebonne.

== Technical information ==
=== Subchannel ===
Subchannel of KWBJ-CD
Channel	Res.	Short name	Programming
22.1	480i		YTA TV

=== Analog-to-digital conversion ===
KWBJ flash-cut its digital signal into operation on UHF channel 22 in 2009. The station uses its UHF channel 22 as its virtual channel instead of its former UHF analog channel 39 (most, though not all, television stations that maintain digital signals map them to their former analog channel allocations).
