= WPCT =

Television station in Panama City Beach, Florida

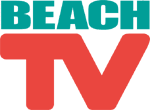
- Panama City Beach, Florida; United States
- Channels: Digital: 33 (UHF); Virtual: 46
- Branding: Beach TV

Programming
- Affiliations: 46.1: Tourist info; for others, see § Subchannels

Ownership
- Owner: Beach TV Properties, Inc.
- Sister stations: WPFN-CD

History
- Founded: July 2, 1986
- First air date: April 3, 1989
- Former call signs: W46AN (1986–1996)
- Former channel numbers: Analog: 46 (UHF, 1989–2009); Digital: 47 (UHF, 2000–2018)
- Former affiliations: Independent (1989–1995); UPN (1995–1998)
- Call sign meaning: W Panama City Television

Technical information
- Licensing authority: FCC
- Facility ID: 4354
- ERP: 160 kW
- HAAT: 72 m (236 ft)
- Transmitter coordinates: 30°10′53.4″N 85°46′48″W

Links
- Public license information: Public file; LMS

WPCT (channel 46) is a television station in Panama City Beach, Florida, United States, which broadcasts information for local tourists. Owned by Beach TV Properties, Inc., the station maintains transmitter facilities on Warner Avenue (off Front Beach Road) just east of Panama City Beach.

== History ==
The station was founded on July 2, 1986, and began broadcasting on April 3, 1989. It was originally an independent station before becoming the UPN affiliate for the Panama City market on January 16, 1995. It aired tourist information during the overnight hours and carried some syndicated talk shows, drama series, movies, and off-network sitcoms during the day outside of prime time network programming until 1998, when UPN was dropped in favor of 24-hour tourist info programming.

== Technical information ==
=== Subchannels ===
The station's signal is multiplexed:

Subchannels of WPCT
Subchannel	Res.	Short name	Programming
46.1	720p	BeachTV	Tourist info
46.2	480i	Outside	[Blank]
46.3	480i	IonPlus	Ion Plus
46.4	480i	Start	Start TV
46.5	480i	GetTV	Great
46.6	480i	WestTV	WEST
46.7	480i	Buzzr	Buzzr

=== Analog-to-digital conversion ===
WPCT shut down its analog signal, over UHF channel 46, on February 17, 2009, the original target date on which full-power television stations in the United States were to transition from analog to digital broadcasts under federal mandate (which was later pushed back to June 12, 2009). The station's digital signal remained on its pre-transition UHF channel 47, using virtual channel 46.
