= WVMA-CD =

Television station in Providence, Rhode Island

- Providence, Rhode Island; United States
- City: Providence, Rhode Island (to move to Hartford, Connecticut)
- Channels: Digital: 23 (UHF), to move to 29 (UHF); Virtual: 17
- Branding: Antenna TV 22.1

Programming
- Affiliations: Antenna TV

Ownership
- Owner: Woodland Communications, LLC
- Operator: Vision Communications

History
- First air date: 1994 (as a translator of WGMU-LP)
- Former call signs: W69DG (1999); W17CI (1999–2014); W47ES-D/-CD (2014)
- Former affiliations: Independent (1994–1995); The WB (1995–1999); UPN (1999–2006); America One (secondary, 2003); MyNetworkTV (2006–2008); Dark (2008–2009, 2013–2020); Retro TV (2009–2013)

Technical information
- Licensing authority: FCC
- Facility ID: 48413
- Class: CD
- ERP: 15 kW; 10 kW (CP)
- HAAT: 149.8 m (491 ft); 155.5 m (510 ft) (CP)
- Transmitter coordinates: 41°51′7.2″N 71°46′44.9″W; 41°41′0.3″N 72°12′55.4″W (CP)
- Translator(s): WCRN-LD 13.5 (30.5 UHF) Boston

Links
- Public license information: Public file; LMS

WVMA-CD (channel 17) is a low-power, Class A television station in Providence, Rhode Island, United States. The station is owned by Woodland Communications, a company controlled by Bill and Paige Christian, partners in Waypoint Media, and has an affiliation with the classic television network Antenna TV. WVMA-CD's transmitter is located on Hartford Pike in Foster, Rhode Island.

== History ==
WVMA-CD was formerly a translator of WGMU-LP, which was itself a translator of WNMN (now WYCI) in Saranac Lake, New York, which at the time was a Retro Television Network affiliate (vowing that MyNetworkTV became a programming service in 2009 instead of a full TV network). As a separate station, WGMU had studios on Pine Haven Shores Road in Shelburne which are still being used. On cable, the station was seen in Burlington on Comcast channel 7 and in Plattsburgh on Charter Spectrum channel 18. It was not seen on Vidéotron systems in Montreal, Quebec. The nearest WGMU-CA outlying translator to Montreal, W52CD channel 52 in St. Albans, barely reached the city. Syndicated programming on the station included Montel, Jerry Springer, Frasier, and Still Standing. It did not air any news or sports programs.

Prior to December 2010, WGMU-CA experienced long term outages (i.e. dead air; static/snow), lasting several weeks or months, and only broadcast sporadically.

The station formerly had a construction permit for a digital transmitter on channel 49. However, the permit no longer appears in the FCC database as of early 2012.

WGMU-CA and repeater W19BR were downgraded from Class A status and reverted to standard low-power stations on October 24, 2012, due to failure to file children's television reports. WGMU-LP had been a class A station since 2002, when the station was still WBVT-LP.

The FCC canceled the licenses of WGMU-LP and repeaters W19BR and WBVT-LP on March 12, 2015, for failure to broadcast for a year; WGMU-LP and W19BR had gone off the air on November 18, 2013, while WBVT shut down four days later. WVMA-CD, with a new status of WGMU's former Claremont repeater, was sold to Sound Communications in 2013 and transferred to Novia Communications (a company partially co-owned with Sound) a year later. WVMA-CD was the company's only media holding outside of its usual territory of upstate New York before it allied itself with Waypoint Media in the late 2010s. As of 2020, it is a full-time affiliate of Antenna TV. Said station has since been re-licensed to Winchendon, Massachusetts, with its transmitter remaining in New Hampshire.
