= KFXF-CD =

Television station in Fairbanks, Alaska

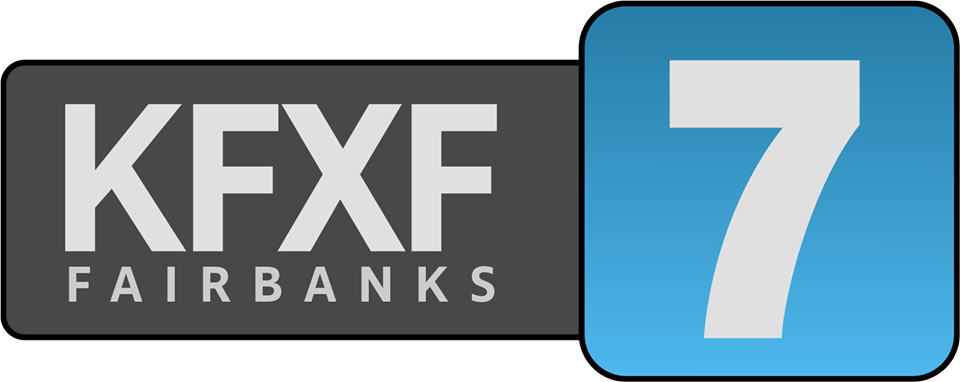
- Fairbanks, Alaska; United States
- Channels: Digital: 22 (UHF); Virtual: 7
- Branding: KFXF 7 Fairbanks

Programming
- Affiliations: 7.1: Last Frontier SEN /; MyNetworkTV; 7.2: CBS; 7.3: MeTV

Ownership
- Owner: Gray Media; (Gray Television Licensee, LLC)
- Sister stations: KTVF, KXDF-CD

History
- First air date: July 2, 1996
- Former call signs: K22EY (1995–2010); K22EY-D (2010–2016); KFXF-LD (2016–2025)
- Former channel numbers: Analog: 22 (UHF, 1996–2010); Virtual: 22 (until 2021)
- Former affiliations: Wireless cable (1996–2003); Fox (2003–2017); MeTV (2017–2025, now on 7.3)
- Call sign meaning: Fox Fairbanks (former affiliation)

Technical information
- Licensing authority: FCC
- Facility ID: 72584
- Class: CD
- ERP: 15 kW
- HAAT: 17.7 m (58 ft)
- Transmitter coordinates: 64°48′42.5″N 147°42′4.2″W
- Translator(s): KTVF-DT 11.2 Fairbanks

Links
- Public license information: Public file; LMS
- Website: www.webcenterfairbanks.com

KFXF-CD (channel 7) is a low-power, Class A television station in Fairbanks, Alaska, United States. It airs a primary sports-themed independent format and has a secondary affiliation with MyNetworkTV. Owned by Gray Media, KFXF-CD is a sister station to NBC affiliate KTVF (channel 11) and Class A CBS affiliate KXDF-CD (channel 13). The three stations share studios on Braddock Street in downtown Fairbanks, where KFXF-CD's transmitter is also located.

== History ==
=== KFXF intellectual unit ===
The KFXF-CD intellectual unit originated on April 20, 1992, when Tanana Valley Television Company signed on K07UU as the area's first commercial station (and fifth in general after KJNP-TV in 1981) since 1955, when KTVF and KATN started. The station upgraded to a full-power license and changed its call letters to KFXF on February 22, 1995.

From its inception, the station was primarily affiliated with Fox. In its early years, K07UU/KFXF ran programming from Canadian music channel MuchMusic during the overnight hours, and for a time in 1993–94 carried the NBA on NBC. Until K13XD (now KXDF-CD) went on the air in August 1996, KFXF also carried some CBS shows. The station also ran UPN programs from 2000 to 2006, when that network merged with The WB to form The CW, which is shown on a digital subchannel of KATN.

After Gray Television's purchase of KTVF, KXDF-CD, and the non-license assets of KFXF on January 13, 2017, all of KFXF's programming was moved to KFXF-LD, which had previously served as a translator of KFXF. The full-power station's license (which was not included in the sale because the market has only five full-power stations, too few to create a duopoly) changed its call letters to KFYF on February 9, 2017 and was subsequently cancelled on March 10.

=== License ===
On March 14, 1995, the Federal Communications Commission granted a construction permit for a new low-powered station in Fairbanks, which received the K22EY call letters. The station signed on 1996.

In 2000, several low-powered stations owned by Goldbelt, Inc. (including K22EY) were sold to ACS Television, L.L.C. ACS Television, a subsidiary of Alaska Communications System, operated its stations as a wireless cable system; ACS put the subsidiary up for sale in 2002 due to financial losses and the costs of converting the stations to digital television. On April 23, 2003, Tanana Valley Television Company acquired 10 stations (including K22EY) from ACS Television. In January 2010, the station flash-cut from analog to digital, modifying its call sign to K22EY-D.

The call letters were changed to KFXF-LD on November 4, 2016. On November 8, 2016, Northern Lights Media, the subsidiary of Gray Television that operates Anchorage stations KTUU-TV and KYES-TV, announced that it would buy KTVF, KFXF-LD and KXDF-CD (then known as KXDD-CD) for $8 million in cash. The sale was completed on January 13, 2017.

Fox announced on October 30, 2017, that it would move its Fairbanks affiliation from KFXF-LD to a subchannel of KATN on November 4; KFXF then became a MyNetworkTV affiliate. In a statement, Gray said that renewing the Fox affiliation "was not financially feasible." For nearly two years after KFXF-LD's affiliation change, the station's schedule remained intact for all hours outside of the Fox lineup as meanwhile the MyNetworkTV schedule replaced the Fox prime time lineup. By October 2019, Gray replaced all syndicated programming on KFXF-LD outside of the MyNetworkTV schedule with the MeTV schedule, quietly continuing to air MyNetworkTV programming from 2 to 4 a.m. on Tuesdays through Saturdays.

As of November 2021, KFXF-LD moved to virtual channel 7, which was formerly used by the full power KFXF until 2017.

On September 2, 2025, KFXF announced that it would relaunch as the Last Frontier Sports & Entertainment Network effective October 6, moving MeTV to its third digital subchannel. The change adds sports programming to the channel's lineup, including local rights to Seattle Kraken hockey.

=== Full-market over-the-air coverage ===
In addition to its own digital signal, KFXF-LD receives full-market over-the-air coverage via a high definition simulcast on KTVF's second digital subchannel (UHF channel 26.2 or virtual channel 11.2) from a transmitter on the Ester Dome. The simulcast is most likely a direct compensation for how on March 2, 2017, Tanana Valley Television surrendered their license for KFYF (the original full-market over-the-air high definition distributor of the programming carried by KFXF-LD) back to the FCC, which canceled it on March 10.

== Subchannels ==
The station's signal is multiplexed:

Subchannels of KFXF-CD
Channel	Res.	Short name	Programming
7.1	720p	KFXF-LD	Last Frontier SEN / MyNetworkTV
7.2	480i	KXDF-CD	CBS (KXDF-CD)
7.3	480i	MeTV	MeTV

Simulcast of subchannels of another station
