= KGUM-FM =

Radio station in Dededo, Guam

- Dededo, Guam; Guam
- Broadcast area: Guam
- Frequency: 105.1 MHz
- Branding: Wave 105 FM

Programming
- Format: News/Talk radio (weekdays); Caribbean music (with local Reggae) (weekends)
- Affiliations: AP News

Ownership
- Owner: Glimpses Media
- Sister stations: KZGZ

History
- First air date: June 4, 1999
- Call sign meaning: Guam

Technical information
- Licensing authority: FCC
- Facility ID: 87891
- Class: C2
- ERP: 12,000 watts
- HAAT: 153 meters (502 ft)
- Transmitter coordinates: 13.489167°N 144.828056°E

Links
- Public license information: Public file; LMS
- Website: thewave105.com

KGUM-FM (105.1 MHz) is a radio station licensed to Dededo, a village in the United States territory of Guam. Owned by Glimpses Media, the station broadcasts both news/talk radio on weekdays and Caribbean music on weekend format branded as "Wave 105".

== History ==
The station hit the airwaves at 3 PM on June 4, 1999, where it broadcast an active rock format as 105.1 The Rock until September 2007. The new branded station as "105.1 The Kat" from 2007 to 2016 and offered a classic hit that focused on 1970s’, 1980s’, and 1990s’ music. In January 2016, the station switches to its former Hot AC format with the slogan known as "Hits of the 90s and New Millennium", then in February 2017 it was introduced the new name as "105.1 KAT FM". On January 18, 2021, the station reverted to its current classic hits for the 70s, 80s and 90s music. On October 7, 2021, it was introduced the new name as 105.1 Solid Radio. On February 5, 2022, the station switched to an adult contemporary format and reverted to "105 The KAT".

After Typhoon Mawar hit Guam on May 26, 2023, Sorensen Media Group went off the air for more than one week until they returned to air on May 29.

In October 2023, Sorensen Media Group opted to sell the station to Glimpses Media, and after a lot of speculation about the station's future, Glimpses confirmed in December that the station would be changing formats. On December 16, 2023, KGUM-FM switched into "Wave 105" for the news and talk station format, then Caribbean/reggae would air every weekend.

== DJs ==
=== Current ===
- Patti Arroyo
- Pauly X Suba

=== Former ===
- Lord Chris Berg
- Bronson
- Charlie "Mama Char" Catbagan
- Louise B. Muna
- Leo Payumo

== Programming ==
=== Current ===
- Mornings with Patty (2023–present)
- The Brightside with Pauly Suba (2024–present)

=== Former ===
- The Pauly Experience (2016–2021)
- The Mama Char Show (2019–2020)
- RY-FI Fire Show (2018–2019)
- The Afternoon Goon with Lord Chris Berg (2017–2019)
- Leo in the Morning (2021–2023)
- Bronson's Choice (2016–2017, 2019–2023)
