= KUAM-TV =

NBC/CBS affiliate in Hagåtña, Guam

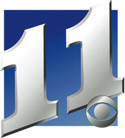
- Hagåtña; Guam
- Channels: Digital: 8 (VHF); Virtual: 8
- Branding: KUAM-TV 8; KUAM News; CBS TV 11 (8.2)

Programming
- Affiliations: 8.1: NBC; 8.2: CBS

Ownership
- Owner: Pacific Telestations, LLC
- Sister stations: KUAM-FM

History
- First air date: August 5, 1956
- Former channel numbers: Analog: 8 (VHF, 1956–2009); Digital: 2 (VHF, 2000–2009)
- Former affiliations: All secondary: ABC (1956–1987); CBS (1956–1995); Fox (1986–1990)
- Call sign meaning: Guam

Technical information
- Licensing authority: FCC
- Facility ID: 51233
- ERP: 3.5 kW
- HAAT: 304 m (997 ft)
- Transmitter coordinates: 13°25′58″N 144°42′45″E
- Translator(s): K30HB-D Hagåtña; K32GB-D Tamuning; K36GJ-D Tamuning

Links
- Public license information: Public file; LMS
- Website: www.kuam.com

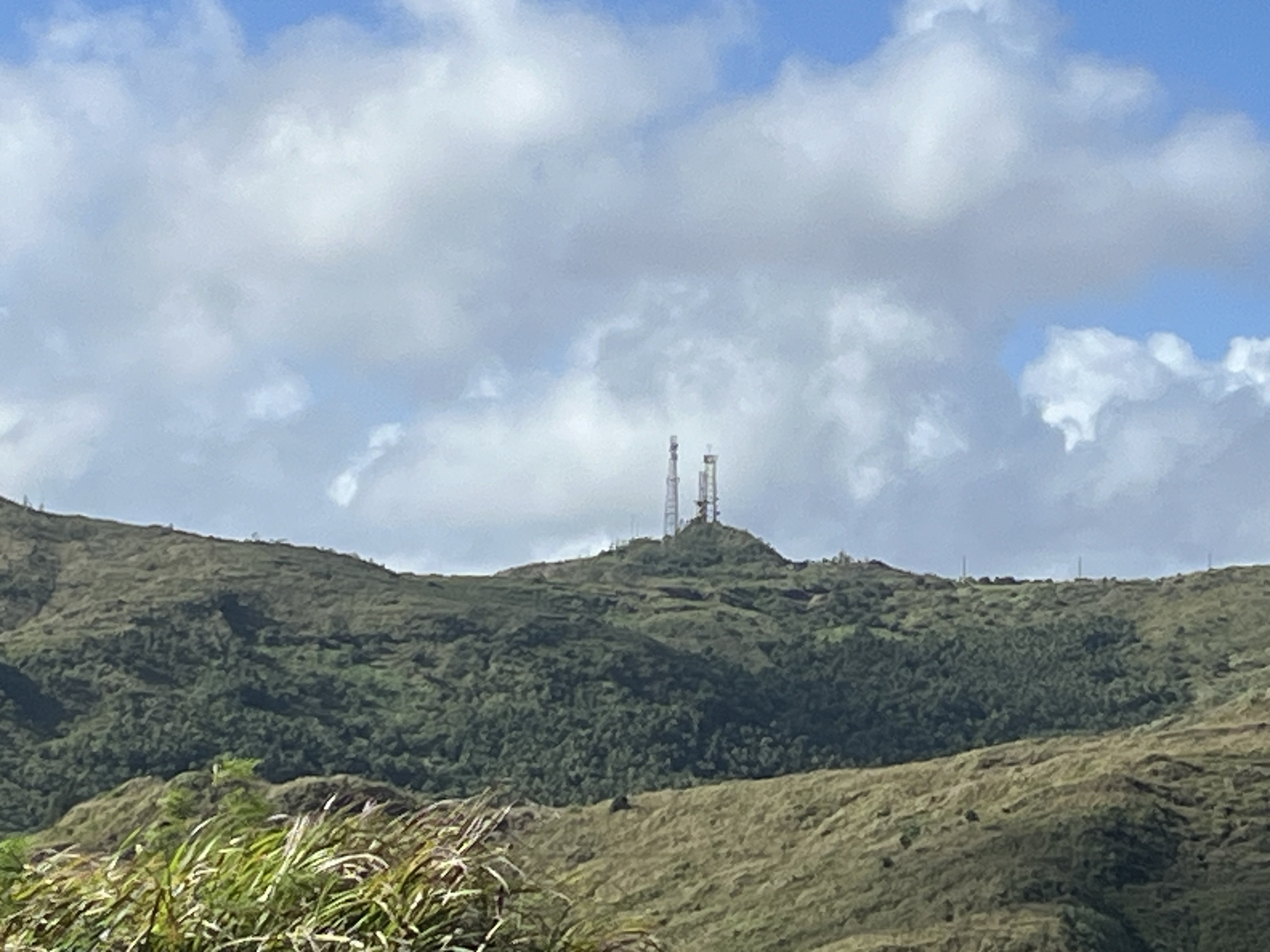
KUAM-TV's transmitter

KUAM-TV (channel 8) is a television station in Hagåtña (Agana), Guam, serving the U.S. territory as an affiliate of NBC and CBS. Owned by Pacific Telestations, LLC, it is sister to the local public access cable channel Local 2. KUAM-TV's studios are located at 600 Harmon Loop in Dededo, and its transmitter is located east-northeast of Agat.

== History ==
KUAM was Guam's first television station, signing on August 5, 1956 (initially intended to open on July 15), on analog channel 8. It carried programming from all three networks, but has always been a primary NBC affiliate, having signed up for the network in May. The KUAM radio and TV stations were damaged by a typhoon on November 10-11, 1962; the TV station took two weeks to repair and resumed telecasts on November 25. From 1964, KUAM signed affiliation agreements with ABC and CBS. As of 1967, Guam had 30,000 television sets. KUAM began its first broadcast in color in 1970. For this end, Gates would supply the station with a 5 kW color transmitter due for shipment in late August. When Fox debuted in 1986, they carried its lineup as well. For a time, this made KUAM one of the few stations to be affiliated with all four major networks.

Despite being affiliated with all four networks, KUAM was hindered by the fact that Guam was a day ahead of the U.S. mainland and that most shows, especially those from the network, were sent via air and/or mail, which meant that viewers would have to wait from a period of two weeks to a month to see any of the offerings. When it was not showing any network fare it featured local in-house programming, syndicated shows and films (mostly travel or cultural) to make up the difference. Since KUAM practiced cherry-picking, certain shows from the networks were picked out. In late 1971, a scandal erupted between Marianas Communications System Inc., owner of Guam Cable TV, and the CBS network, which had an agreement stipulating the license of certain CBS shows not carried by KUAM, such as Gunsmoke, My Three Sons, You Are There, Hawaii Five-O and Cimarron Strip.

KUAM-TV and KUAM radio were originally owned by Harry S. Engel, a former owner-manager of radio station KVEN in Ventura, California, with Adam Young International as the stations' representative. Two enterprising mainlanders, H. Scott Kilgore and Sam Rubin, formed the Pacific Broadcasting Corporation and bought the KUAM stations in 1964; the company changed its name to Pacific Telestations, Inc. in the 1970s and took full control on September 16, 1977. Under new ownership, as well as loans from Citibank, the station would invest $100,000 in new towers and $250,000 in new equipment for the next five years. Engel defected to educational station KGTF in 1975 (KUAM-TV's first competitor) and later worked in Australia, Africa and Hawaii before his death on June 25, 1983.

Between 1969 and 1980, a sister station, WSZE-TV (channel 10) served the Northern Mariana Islands from Saipan.

Technical difficulties hit the station in the week ending November 18, 1985, which, according to general manager Bobby Berger, triggered other problems. On February 7, 1986, it planned to send a §1,482 bill to the Guam Power Authority for illegally turning off its power, which caused chronic financial problems. In March 1986, a group of Los Angeles businessmen planned to buy KUAM-TV from Pacific Telestations, which had been suffering with financial difficulties for more than a year. The TV and FM transmitters were engulfed in a grass fire on April 12, 1988, after that, Citibank announced that its bankruptcy petition should be dismissed. Berger said on July 30 that there were no longer any threats to the station, but owed $679,733 (plus additional interest and penalties) to the bank and applied for Chapter 11 protection. On October 13, Bob Berger announced that KUAM would return to full operation within three days, after the station was hit by "power spikes" for a month, where the station did not carry sound. In late November, the goal was established to keep the station operational. A sale of Pacific Telestations was mooted, but Berger denied these claims.

KUAM would lose ABC to KTGM when it began operations in 1987, and lost Fox to the same station in 1990. CBS programming was dropped in 1995 with the launch of KUAM-LP; that station, in turn, would be added as KUAM's digital subchannel, broadcasting on channel 8.2, in 2009.

KUAM's previous logo, as News 8, is similar to the logo currently used by KIFI-TV, an unrelated ABC affiliate.

As satellite technology started to take off and expand, KUAM began to gradually catch up with the rest of the continental United States. The station now follows the complete NBC schedule, but on a Tuesday–Monday pattern rather than the traditional Monday–Sunday pattern, with the exception of NBC's sports lineup, which is live in the early morning hours of Sunday (for all Saturday games and events) and Monday (for all Sunday games and events).

On March 5, 2000, the two KUAM stations (8 and ITV 11, also available OTA as a low-power station) started carrying TV bingo twice a week, sponsored by the Guam National Olympic Committee. Island Television, which was its sister channel on cable (channel 11), would lose The WB programming to KTGM, a primary ABC affiliate, in June 2001.

In 2006 KUAM's website, kuam.com, received honors at that year's RTNDA Edward R. Murrow Award for having the best small market web site.

On February 18, 2009, KUAM signed off its analog signal on channel 8 and switched on its digital signal also on channel 8.

== Notable alumni ==
- Madeleine Bordallo – Former TV host; served as the territory's Delegate to the U.S. House of Representatives

== Subchannels ==
The station's signal is multiplexed:

Channel	Programming
8.1	NBC
8.2	CBS

== See also ==
- Channel 8 digital TV stations in the United States
- Channel 8 virtual TV stations in the United States
- Channel 11 branded TV stations in the United States
