= WMNS-LD =

Television station in Charlotte Amalie, U.S. Virgin Islands (2001–2023)

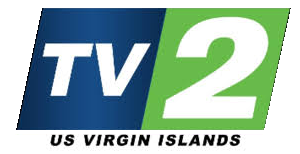
- Charlotte Amalie; United States Virgin Islands
- Channels: Digital: 22 (UHF); Virtual: 22
- Branding: TV2 (general); News 2 (newscasts)

Programming
- Affiliations: Daystar (2001–2009); CBS (via TV2 2009–2018, via WSEE-TV 2018–2019); Independent (via TV2, 2019–2023)

Ownership
- Owner: V.I. Christian Ministries, Inc.; (TV2, Inc.)
- Operator: Innovative Communications Corporation via LMA

History
- First air date: October 17, 2001
- Last air date: September 20, 2023; (21 years, 338 days)
- Former call signs: K22GA (2001–2003); WMNS-LP (2003–2016)
- Former channel numbers: Analog: 22 (UHF, 2001–2016)

Technical information
- Licensing authority: FCC
- Facility ID: 125735
- Class: LD
- ERP: 3.75 kW
- HAAT: 425 m (1,394 ft)
- Transmitter coordinates: 18°21′12″N 64°58′34″W

Links
- Public license information: LMS

WMNS-LD (channel 22) was a low-power independent television station serving the United States Virgin Islands that was licensed to Charlotte Amalie, Saint Thomas. It was owned by V.I. Christian Ministries, Inc. and operated by Innovative Communications Corporation alongside cable-only channel TV2. WMNS-LD's transmitter was located atop Hawk Hill.

== History ==
The station was founded on October 17, 2001, as K22GA. It gained the WMNS-LP callsign on December 22, 2003.

Prior to July 13, 2009, WMNS-LP broadcast Daystar programming. However, after CBS programming moved from WVXF to the cable-only channel TV2, WMNS-LD provided over-the-air coverage for TV2.

V.I. Christian Ministries ceased operations of WMNS-LD on September 20, 2023; its license was surrendered on December 12.

== Subchannel ==
Subchannel of WMNS-LD
Subchannel	Res.	Short name	Programming
22.1	1080i	TV2-VI	Main WMNS-LD programming
