= Channel 49 =

Channel 49 refers to several television stations:

- INCTV 49 in Metro Manila Philippines

== Canada ==
The following television stations formerly broadcast on digital channel 49 (UHF frequencies covering 681.25-685.75 MHz) in Canada:

- CHEK-DT in Victoria, British Columbia
- CJNT-DT in Montreal, Quebec
- CKAL-DT in Calgary, Alberta

== Mexico ==
The following television stations operate on virtual channel 49 in Mexico:

- XHDTV-TDT in Tecate, Baja California

== See also ==
- Channel 49 TV stations in Mexico
- Channel 49 digital TV stations in the United States
- Channel 49 virtual TV stations in the United States
- Channel 49 low-power TV stations in the United States
