= KAXT-CD =

Television station in San Francisco

- San Francisco–San Jose, California; United States
- Channels: Digital: 22 (UHF), shared with KTLN-TV; Virtual: 1

Programming
- Affiliations: 1.2: Catchy Comedy

Ownership
- Owner: Weigel Broadcasting; (KAXT-TV LLC)
- Sister stations: KTLN-TV

History
- First air date: May 31, 1989
- Former call signs: K22DD (1989–2001); KAXT-CA (2001–2009); KAXT-LD (2009–2011)
- Former channel numbers: Analog: 22 (UHF, 1989–2009); Digital: 42 (UHF, 2009–2020)
- Former affiliations: Tiempos Finales TV (1989−1990); TBN (1990–2003); Almavision (2003–2006); Tele Vida Abundante; Total Living Network (until 2019); GEB America (until 2019)

Technical information
- Licensing authority: FCC
- Facility ID: 37689
- Class: CD
- ERP: 15 kW
- HAAT: 688 m (2,257 ft)
- Transmitter coordinates: 37°29′57″N 121°52′20″W

Links
- Public license information: Public file; LMS

KAXT-CD (channel 1) is a low-power, Class A television station licensed to both San Francisco and San Jose, California, United States, broadcasting the digital multicast network Catchy Comedy to the San Francisco Bay Area. It is owned by Weigel Broadcasting alongside Heroes & Icons outlet KTLN-TV (channel 68). The two stations share studios on Pelican Way in San Rafael, and transmitter facilities on Mount Allison.

Due to its low-power status, KAXT-CD's broadcasting radius does not reach all of the San Francisco Bay Area. Because of that, its market affiliation is shared with KICU-TV (channel 36) which broadcasts Catchy Comedy on its fourth digital subchannel.

== History ==
=== Early years ===
Founded May 31, 1989, the station previously broadcast in analog on UHF channel 22 as KAXT-CA, an affiliate of Spanish-language religious network Tiempos Finales TV, formerly being an affiliate of TBN from 1990 to 2003, and of Almavision from 2003 to 2006.

=== Changes ===
On July 31, 2009, KAXT began ATSC digital TV transmissions on UHF channel 42, which had been vacated by KTNC-TV. (The previous month, former owner of KTVU/KICU-TV, Cox Media Group unsuccessfully applied for a license to use the same frequency for a KTVU digital translator.) KAXT's digital transmissions used the call sign KAXT-LD, later KAXT-CD. The station was the first digital television station to broadcast 12 video streams on a standard 6 MHz 19.39 Mbit/s ATSC stream. Using statistical multiplexing technology in the encoders and multiplexer, the system provides variable bit rate compression needed to provide full quality standard definition video across all of the channels with enough bandwidth for radio (audio only) services.

Broadcast Engineering nominated KAXT as Station of the Year for 2009, the first low power television station to receive such a distinction.

In 2016, San Jose Councilman Ash Kalra filed a Federal Communications Commission complaint against the station, alleging that various Vietnamese-language subchannels had run a large volume of advertisements for opponent Madison Nguyen in the 27th State Assembly District election without disclosing it in the station's public files, as required by the FCC.

=== Since 2017 ===
The DTV virtual channels between KAXT-LD's channel 22 (RF 42, formerly 22) and KRCB's channel 22 (RF 23) in Cotati had significant overlap that caused a PSIP conflict, allowing KAXT-CD to move to a new virtual channel, Channel 1. KAXT had been operating with a PSIP of Channel 1, at one point with 12 different video program streams and one audio-only channel for a total of 13 virtual channels for a few years until the late 2010s.

Weigel Broadcasting agreed to acquire KAXT-CD and KTLN-TV, along with KVOS-TV and KFFV in Seattle, from OTA Broadcasting in a $23.2 million deal on October 18, 2017. The sale was completed on April 15, 2019. By 2018, most of KAXT's Vietnamese-language subchannels had moved to KSCZ-LD.

== Programming ==
Until 2019, KAXT broadcast an electronic program guide, shopping channels, and several channels of ethnic news, entertainment, and religious programming. Several subchannels were produced locally, while the remainder were simulcasts. KAXT is the only television station in the United States that broadcasts on virtual channel 1.

=== Former affiliations ===
Since its transition to digital broadcasting, KAXT has broadcast a wide variety of programming, both local and syndicated:

- Bahía TV – family-oriented Spanish-language programming (channel 1.4)
- Cool Music Radio – audio simulcast (channel 1.14)
- Coastal Television Network – tourism-focused channel based in Monterey, California (channel 1.5)
- Colours TV – multicultural programming (channel 1.6)
- Corner Store – informercials (channel 1.9)
- Creation TV – Cantonese Christian
- Diya TV – South Asian programming (variously channels 1.2 and 1.5, now on KTSF 26.2)
- FAN – Filipino programming (channel 1.8)
- Hải Lê TV – Vietnamese-language programming (channel 1.11, now on KSCZ 16.1)
- i2TV – public-access television (channel 1.8)
- KCTV/TVHS – Taiwanese programming (channel 1.9)
- La Voz – audio simulcast of Christian programming (channel 1.15)
- My Family TV – family-oriented programming (variously channels 1.2, 1.6, and 1.7)
- NetV – Vietnamese- and English-language programming (channel 1.12, now on KSCZ 16.16)
- Nét Việt – Vietnamese-language programming (channel 1.6, now on KSCZ 16.6)
- Tiempos Finales – Spanish Christian (channel 1.10)
- PeanutTV – real estate listings (channel 1.12)
- Quê Hương TV – Vietnamese-language programming (channel 1.5, now on KSCZ 16.5)
- Quê Hương Radio – audio simulcast of KZSJ 1120 (channel 1.13)
- Retro TV – classic sitcoms (channel 1.2)
- SKDTV – South Korean programming (channel 1.7)
- TheCoolTV – music videos (variously channels 1.1 and 1.12, now on KTLN 68.2)
- U Channel – Chinese/Taiwanese programming (channel 1.9, now on KSCZ 16.9)
- Việt Phố Tivi – Vietnamese-language programming (channel 1.3, now on KSCZ 16.8)
- Vietface TV – Vietnamese-language programming (channel 1.8, now on KSCZ 16.4)
- Vietoday – Vietnamese-language programming (channel 1.6, now on KTSF 26.5)
- VieTop – Vietnamese-language programming (channel 1.7, now on KSCZ 16.7)
- What's On – electronic program guide (channel 1.1)

== Subchannel ==
Subchannel of KAXT-CD and KTLN-TV
License	Subchannel	Res.	Short name	Programming
KAXT-CD	1.2	480i	KAXT-SD	Catchy Comedy
KTLN-TV	68.1	720p	KTLN-HD	Heroes & Icons
KTLN-TV	68.2	720p	MeTV	MeTV
KTLN-TV	68.3	480i	Story	Story Television
KTLN-TV	68.4	480i	MeTV+	MeTV+
KTLN-TV	68.5	480i	Quest	Quest
KTLN-TV	68.6	480i	TOONS	MeTV Toons
KTLN-TV	68.7	480i	WEST	WEST

== See also ==
- Channel 1 virtual TV stations in the United States
- Channel 22 digital TV stations in the United States
- Channel 22 low-power TV stations in the United States
