= KQSL =

Television station in Cloverdale, California

- Cloverdale–Fort Bragg–San Francisco–Oakland–San Jose, California; United States
- City: Cloverdale, California (Note: Originally licensed to Fort Bragg, California; moved to Cloverdale in 2026.)
- Channels: Digital: 8 (VHF); Virtual: 8

Programming
- Affiliations: 8.1: Total Living Network; 8.2: Daystar

Ownership
- Owner: One Ministries, Inc.
- Sister stations: KEDB, KQTA-LD, KORB, KEDS, KEDZ, KEDR

History
- Founded: 1990
- First air date: March 1990
- Former call signs: KFWU (1990–2003); KUNO-TV (2003–2010); KBQR (2010–2011)
- Former channel numbers: Analog: 8 (VHF, 1990–2009); Digital: 15 (UHF, 2002–2009)
- Former affiliations: As satellite of KAEF-TV: ABC (1990–1997); As satellite of KTNC-TV: Independent (1997–2001); Azteca América (2001–2007); TuVision (2007–2009); Estrella TV (2009–2010); As stand-alone station: Retro TV (2010–2011); TheCoolTV (2011–2012); FilmOn (2012–2013); Independent (2013–2016, 2017–2018); Sonlife (2016–2017)
- Call sign meaning: QSL = Q code for receipt of transmission

Technical information
- Licensing authority: FCC
- Facility ID: 8378
- ERP: DTS1: 26 kW; DTS2: 1 kW
- HAAT: DTS1: 744 m (2,441 ft); DTS2: 593 m (1,946 ft)
- Transmitter coordinates: DTS1: 39°41′37.5″N 123°34′47″W; DTS2: 38°45′44″N 122°50′30″W

Links
- Public license information: Public file; LMS
- Website: kqsl.org

KQSL (channel 8) is a religious television station licensed to Cloverdale, California, United States, serving the San Francisco Bay Area which is a broadcast partner of the Total Living Network. The station is owned by One Ministries, Inc., a 501(c)(3) non-profit organization based in Santa Rosa, California. KQSL's studios are located on Performance Drive in Santa Rosa. The station broadcasts from a two-site distributed transmission system, with transmitters on Cahto Peak west of Laytonville and on Geyser Peak northeast of Geyserville.

== History ==
KQSL debuted in March 1990 as KFWU, originally licensed to Fort Bragg, California, and owned by California Oregon Broadcasting as a satellite of ABC affiliate KAEF-TV in Eureka. Previously, cable operators in Fort Bragg would carry either network-owned KGO-TV (channel 7) or KNTV (channel 11, now an NBC owned-and-operated station). Despite KGO and KNTV's signals not being able to reach Fort Bragg at that time, KFWU was the third ABC station in the San Francisco Bay Area. However, the station was sold to Lamco Communications (along with KAEF) in 1995. It was then sold to Sainte Limited in 1996, and to Pappas Telecasting Companies in 1997, at which point KFWU became a satellite of KTNC-TV in Concord (however, at first, KFWU was considered the main station and KTNC the satellite). It became KUNO-TV in 2003.

On November 7, 2008, KUNO was taken silent due to financial troubles. In May 2008, Pappas filed for bankruptcy protection. On November 5, 2008, KUNO returned to on-air operation just under one year of having been silent with its analog facilities on channel 8 and pre-transition DTV facility on channel 15.

On January 16, 2009, it was announced that several Pappas stations, including KTNC and KUNO, would be sold to New World TV Group after the sale received United States bankruptcy court approval.

On June 12, 2009, KUNO signed off of its analog signal and completed its move to digital. Both KUNO and KDSL-CA (licensed to Ukiah, California) were transferred to Titan TV Broadcast Group on October 15, 2009. KUNO was taken silent again on October 31, 2009, and was subsequently sold to Jeff Chang in July 2010 for $100,000. The sale to Jeff Chang was completed on October 6, 2010, and he got the station back on the air just under one year of it being silent. If not for Jeff Chang relaunching KQSL's on-air operation, its license would have been revoked.

Upon taking over, Chang dropped the KTNC simulcast in favor of Retro Television Network programming, under new call letters. In October 2010, he call signed the station as KBQR; in June 2011, the station was given new a new call sign again, this time to KQSL. The KQSL call sign had previously belonged to an LPFM construction permit in Penngrove, California, belonging to One Ministries, Inc., and coincidentally One Ministries, Inc. would become the future owner of KQSL in 2018.

KQSL joined TheCoolTV in September 2011; the network regarded the station as its San Francisco affiliate. In 2012, KQSL dropped TheCoolTV and picked up FilmOn programming. The station dropped FilmOn in early 2013, but carried a schedule of classic television shows and entertainment news magazines and specials until 2016. After this, it began broadcasting Jimmy Swaggart's Sonlife Broadcasting Network.

Jeff Chang was successful in getting KQSL onto Dish Network, AT&T U-verse and DirecTV throughout the San Francisco Bay Area after getting the station back on the air. Video fiber circuits were installed to provide Dish, U-Verse and DirecTV feeds of KQSL.

On August 1, 2017, KQSL reverted to independent programming. The Sonlife affiliation had transferred to KCNS. On January 15, 2018, KQSL began carrying Total Living Network (TLN) programming as a simulcast of TLN programming carried on Comcast cable channel 138 in Chicago. TLN also was carried on a West Coast feed until April 16, 2019, on KTLN, licensed to Novato, California. KQSL began carrying TLN's West Coast feed, TLN West, on April 6, 2019.

On July 11, 2018, One Ministries, Inc. completed its purchase of KQSL from Jeff Chang for $2 million. K11WP-D was also sold to Jeff Chang for $1 as part of the KQSL transaction. The broadcast partnership with TLN was retained. One Ministries, Inc. had closed a deal to sell three LPTV stations to HC2 Holdings for $2.15 million one day prior to having consummating the deal to purchase KQSL. One Ministries also owns and operates 5 translators of KQSL in Northern California and Reno, Nevada, as well as low-power TV station KKRM-CD in Chico which has a series of translators throughout Northern California, most of which air KQSL on their .8 digital subchannel. A One Ministries-owned station, KQTA-LD in San Francisco, airs KQSL on its .2 subchannel. In addition to airing programming from TLN West, KQSL also airs locally originated programming daily from midnight to 6 a.m. and Saturdays from midnight to 5 p.m.

KQSL began airing local news for Northern California and Southern Oregon in December 2018. The local news program, from Medford, Oregon-licensed KDSO-LD and KDOV-LD, is called Mornings on the Dove which aired 6 to 8 a.m. weekdays initially and was subsequently moved to noon to 1 p.m. weekdays in April 2019. This program airs live on KKPM-CD and its translators on their primary channel which airs TheDove, the religious channel where it originates.

KQSL upgraded to 1080i HD picture quality in March 2019 on Dish Network and April 2019 on DirecTV. KQSL became a distributed transmission system on March 8, 2021, with a second facility to serve Cloverdale. Subsequently, on March 28, 2022, the second DTS facility was moved to Geyser Peak to serve both Cloverdale and Geyserville, California.

== Technical information ==
=== Subchannels ===
The station's signal is multiplexed:

Subchannels of KQSL
Channel	Res.	Short name	Programming
8.1	720p	KQSL	Total Living Network
8.2	720p	Daystar	Daystar

=== Translators ===
KQSL is rebroadcast on the following low-power translators in Northern California and Nevada.

- K02QP-D RF Channel 2, Virtual 45 Chowchilla
- K15FJ-D RF Channel 15, Virtual 15 Lakeport
- K06QL-D RF Channel 6, Virtual 15 Modesto
- K02QW-D RF Channel 2, Virtual 13 Reno, NV
- KEVO-LD RF Channel 16, Virtual 40 Reno, NV

KQSL is rebroadcast on a digital subchannel of the following low-power translators in Northern California and Nevada.

- KKRM-LD RF Channel 11, Virtual 11.8 Chico
- K21OY-D RF Channel 21, Virtual 21.8 Chico
- K14TG-D RF Channel 14, Virtual 17.1 Monterey
- KFMY-LD RF Channel 6, Virtual 15.2 Petaluma
- K16IW-D RF Channel 16, Virtual 16.8 Redding
- KRDT-CD RF Channel 23, Virtual 23.8 Redding
- K29OI-D RF Channel 29, Virtual 29.8 Redding
- KZHD-LD RF Channel 22, Virtual 15.2 Rohnert Park
- K04RS-D RF Channel 4, Virtual 3.1 Salinas
- KURK-LD RF Channel 3, Virtual 3.4 San Francisco
- KQTA-LD RF Channel 14, Virtual 15.2 San Francisco
- KQSL-LD RF Channel 4, Virtual 17.4 San Rafael
- KUKR-LD RF Channel 26, Virtual 27.4 Santa Rosa
- KKPM-CD RF Channel 28, Virtual 28.8 Yuba City
- KYUB-LD RF Channel 15, Virtual 15.8 Yuba City
- KRJR-LD RF Channel 12, Virtual 44.4 Sacramento
