= WTBC =

WTBC may refer to:

- WTBC (AM), a radio station (1230 AM) licensed to serve Tuscaloosa, Alabama, United States
- WTBC-FM, a radio station (100.3 FM) licensed to serve Chicago, Illinois, United States
- WTBC-LP, a television station (channel 65) formerly licensed to serve Tallahassee, Florida, United States
- WBHJ, a radio station (95.7 FM) licensed to serve Midfield, Alabama, which held the call sign WTBC-FM from 1958 to 1969
