= OTA Broadcasting =

American broadcasting company

OTA Broadcasting, LLC
- Type: Private
- Industry: Broadcast television
- Founded: 2011
- Founder: Michael Dell
- Defunct: 2019
- Fate: Stations sold
- Headquarters: Fairfax, Virginia, United States
- Owner: Michael Dell
- Parent: MSD Capital

OTA Broadcasting, LLC was a broadcasting company founded in 2011 by Michael Dell. The company was based in Fairfax, Virginia.

== History ==
OTA Broadcasting was founded in 2011 by Michael Dell's MSD Capital. It had been rumored that Dell formed OTA Broadcasting to buy stations that could be sold in the Federal Communications Commission (FCC) spectrum auction.

The company's first acquisition was announced in June 2011 when it was announced that it was acquiring KTLN-TV in San Rafael, California. The purchase closed that October.

OTA reached an agreement to purchase WTBL-CD in Lenoir, NC, located in the Charlotte DMA, for $500,000.

On October 4, 2013, Journal Broadcast Group announced that it had entered an agreement to sell KMIR-TV and KPSE-LD in Palm Springs, California to OTA. The acquisition closed in January 2014. KMIR became OTA's first station affiliated with one of the "Big Three" networks.

On April 13, 2017, the FCC announced that OTA's WEMW-CD was a successful bidder in the spectrum auction, and would be surrendering its license in exchange for $12,394,400. OTA surrendered WEMW-CD's license to the FCC for cancellation on July 21, 2017.

=== Post-spectrum auction ===
On July 21, 2017, OTA Broadcasting announced its sale of KMIR-TV and KPSE-LD to Entravision Communications for $21 million. The sale completed November 1, 2017.

On August 7, 2017, it was announced that Nexstar Media Group would acquire the non-spectrum operating assets of WLWC from OTA.

Weigel Broadcasting, on October 25, 2017, announced it would acquire KAXT-CD, KTLN-TV, KFFV, and KVOS-TV for $23.2 million.

NBCUniversal filed an application to purchase WYCN-CD on October 27, 2017.

In November 2017, HC2 Holdings announced they were purchasing low-power television stations from OTA, including WKHU-CD Kittanning, PA, WMVH-CD in Charleroi, PA, WWKH-CD in Uniontown, PA, WWLM-CD in Washington, PA and WJMB-CD in Butler, PA for $275,000. In a separate deals, HC2 is buying KUGB-CD in Houston for $1.5 million and W21CK-D in Charlotte for $500,000.

On December 5, 2017, Ion exercised an option to buy the WLWC license for $150,000; the deal was made possible by a change in FCC ownership rules that eliminated the requirement that there be at least eight owners of television stations in a market following the formation of a duopoly. Ion also entered into a shared services agreement, retroactive to October 1, to operate WLWC.

== Former stations ==
City of license / Market	Station	Channel TV (RF)	Owned from	Status
Palm Springs	KMIR-TV	36 (46)	2014–2017	NBC affiliate owned by Entravision Communications
Palm Springs	KPSE-LD	29 (50)	2014–2017	MyNetworkTV affiliate owned by Entravision Communications
San Rafael – San Francisco – San Jose	KTLN-TV	68 (47)	2011–2019	Heroes & Icons owned-and-operated station (O&O), owned by Weigel Broadcasting
San Rafael – San Francisco – San Jose	KAXT-CD	1 (42)	2016–2019	Catchy Comedy owned-and-operated station (O&O), owned by Weigel Broadcasting
Nashua – Boston	WYCN-CD	13 (36)	2013–2018	NBC owned-and-operated station (O&O), WBTS-CD
Lenoir – Charlotte	WTBL-CD	49 (49)	2015–2017	defunct, License cancelled October 25, 2017
New York City	WEBR-CD	49 (17)	2012–2017	FNX affiliate, WNDT-CD, owned by WNET
Bridgeport – Wheeling	WVTX-CD	28 (28)	2013–2017	defunct, License cancelled October 25, 2017
Pittsburgh	WEPA-CD	59 (16)	2013–2017	defunct, License cancelled October 25, 2017
Pittsburgh	WEMW-CD	59 (19)	2013–2017	defunct, License cancelled October 25, 2017
New Bedford – Providence	WLWC	28 (17)	2013–2018	Court TV affiliate owned by Inyo Broadcast Holdings
Houston	KUGB-CD	28 (28)	2013–2017	GEB America owned by HC2 Holdings
Bellingham – Seattle	KVOS-TV	12 (35)	2012–2018	Univision affiliate owned by Weigel Broadcasting
Bellingham – Seattle	KFFV	44 (44)	2011–2018	MeTV owned-and-operated (O&O) station, owned by Weigel Broadcasting
Weirton	WJPW-CD	18 (18)	2013–2017	defunct, License cancelled October 25, 2017
