= KVOS-TV =

Television station in Bellingham, Washington

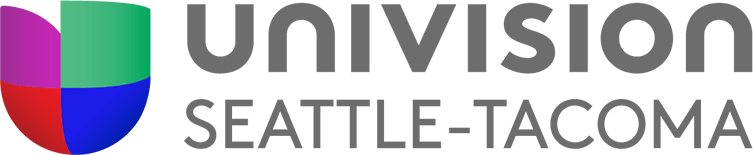
- Bellingham–Seattle–Tacoma, Washington; United States
- City: Bellingham, Washington
- Channels: Digital: 14 (UHF); Virtual: 12
- Branding: Univision Seattle–Tacoma; H&I Washington (12.8)

Programming
- Affiliations: 12.1: Univision; for others, see § Subchannels

Ownership
- Owner: Weigel Broadcasting; (KVOS-TV LLC)
- Sister stations: KFFV

History
- First air date: June 3, 1953
- Former channel numbers: Analog: 12 (VHF, 1953–2009); Digital: 35 (UHF, until 2019)
- Former affiliations: DuMont (primary 1953–1955, secondary 1955–1956); CBS (primary 1955–1979, secondary 1979–1987); Independent (1979–2011); Citytv (secondary, 1990–2002); MeTV (2011–2018); Heroes & Icons (2018–2024)
- Call sign meaning: Kessler's Voice of Seattle (from former sister radio station)

Technical information
- Licensing authority: FCC
- Facility ID: 35862
- ERP: 535 kW
- HAAT: 799 m (2,621 ft)
- Transmitter coordinates: 48°40′49.4″N 122°50′26.4″W

Links
- Public license information: Public file; LMS
- Website: www.kvos.com

KVOS-TV (channel 12) is a television station licensed to Bellingham, Washington, United States, serving the Seattle–Tacoma market as an affiliate of the Spanish-language network Univision. It is owned by Weigel Broadcasting alongside Seattle-licensed MeTV station KFFV, channel 44. Its other subchannels carry Weigel's other diginet concepts. Though it now functions as a Seattle-market station, for much of its history it primarily served an audience in southwestern British Columbia, Canada, including Vancouver and Victoria.

KVOS-TV's transmitter is situated atop Mount Constitution on Orcas Island in the San Juan Islands, at an altitude of 2,621 feet (799 m) above the adjacent terrain. The station's signal is very well received throughout the British Columbia Lower Mainland, southern Vancouver Island, and much of northwest Washington. KVOS-TV's original studios were located on Ellis Street in Bellingham. However, with the sale of KVOS-TV to OTA Broadcasting in 2010, the Bellingham facility was closed and the station currently shares studios with KFFV on Third Avenue South in Seattle. KVOS-TV at one time maintained offices in Burnaby, British Columbia, and before that on West 7th Avenue in Vancouver, but no longer has a physical presence in the Vancouver area.

== History ==
=== Early years ===
KVOS signed on June 3, 1953; owned by Bellingham businessman Rogan Jones along with KVOS radio (AM 790, now KGMI). Jones had owned the radio station since 1928, and was best known for being the focus of a case that established broadcasters' right to the same news reports as newspapers. Its first broadcast was a kinescope of Queen Elizabeth II's coronation, which took place the previous day. Since Canada had no television stations operating west of Ontario at that point (it was not until that December that Vancouver would get a locally-operated TV station of their own in CBC outlet CBUT), the British government flew film of the BBC's coverage to Vancouver, where the Mounties escorted it to the border. The Washington State Patrol then drove the film to Bellingham. The station's original slogan was "Your Peace Arch Station, serving Northwest Washington and British Columbia."

KVOS initially experienced financial trouble, despite Jones thinking that he could successfully support a television station in a city the size of Bellingham. He built a powerful transmitter on Orcas Island in hopes of reaching Seattle, but even with increased power, it did not cover enough of the Seattle area to solve the problem. For a time, the revenues from his radio station were all that kept channel 12 afloat. In 1955, Jones, realizing that most of his audience was across the border, incorporated KVOS in Canada, establishing a subsidiary company in Vancouver. The subsidiary, KVOS-TV Limited, brought in revenue for the station by allowing many Vancouver-area businesses to buy advertising time on the station. KVOS-TV continued to broadcast from Bellingham, with much of its audience based in southwestern British Columbia.

After just nine years of owning KVOS-TV, in 1962 Jones sold the station to Miami-based Wometco Enterprises.

Prior to the advent of Canadian content regulations in the early 1970s, Canadian television stations typically spent so little money on domestic television production that KVOS's Vancouver production office was actually one of the largest Canadian production studios anywhere in the entire country, investing most prominently in television documentaries through its Canawest Film Studios division and employing more Canadian writers, actors, artists and musicians than any other media organization in Canada besides the CBC, according to Vancouver MP Simma Holt.

The station was further damaged by a 1976 change in Canadian tax law, by which Canadian companies could no longer write off advertising purchased on American television stations as a tax deduction. In its efforts to stop the change, the station had proposed that it be granted an exemption on the condition that it then return $2 million per year back to Canadian television production; its proposal did not succeed, but the station survived the hit by closing its Canadian production office and reducing its advertising rates to offset the tax increase that its advertisers would have to pay. Even into the 1990s, the station was still sometimes criticized in CRTC licensing hearings pertaining to the Vancouver television market for purportedly draining advertising revenue from the Vancouver stations; CKVU-TV president Daryl Duke once even went so far as to compare KVOS to smallpox.

Dave Mintz, who had been a minority investor in the station since 1955 and president of the station since 1961, left the station in 1979 to become president of Canada's fledgling Global Television Network. Although American by birth, due to the importance of the Vancouver operations to the station, Mintz was residing full-time in Vancouver by the time he took the Global job.

=== Network affiliations, 1955–1980 ===
KVOS began as an affiliate of DuMont upon sign-on in 1953 and remained so until DuMont went off the air in 1956. From January 1, 1955, until about 1979, KVOS was a primary CBS affiliate. In the late 1970s, KVOS sharply reduced its carriage of CBS programming to resolve two commercial disputes. First, Seattle's CBS affiliate, KIRO-TV, had launched complaints against the station and CBS regarding duplicate transmission of CBS programming in the Seattle media market. Second, Canadian Radio-television and Telecommunications Commission (CRTC) regulations seeking to increase Canadian content and reduce the number of American network affiliates retransmitted on cable television systems in Canada put pressure on the station.

=== Conversion to independent and secondary Citytv affiliation ===
While KVOS nominally retained its CBS affiliation up to 1987, carrying a few CBS programs such as 60 Minutes, it transitioned into an independent station which primarily carried a diverse mix of syndicated and locally produced programming, including locally produced news and public affairs programs. Beginning in 1990, the station also carried a number of programs syndicated from the Toronto-based independent station Citytv, whose owner CHUM Limited did not yet have an outlet in nearby Vancouver.

Wometco was bought by Kohlberg Kravis Roberts in 1984. KKR sold off the Wometco group in 1985, with KVOS sold to Ackerley Communications. In the early 1990s, due to Federal Communications Commission syndicated exclusivity rules affecting the Seattle media market, KVOS was dropped from most Seattle cable television systems. For part of this era, the station used both Canadian and American TV ratings at the start of each program, and was believed to be the only station on either side of the border to do so. Since at least early 2007, with the station's realignment toward a U.S. audience, only U.S. ratings have been shown.

=== Second stint as an independent station ===
In 2001, CHUM Limited purchased the Vancouver station CKVU-TV from Canwest (turning it into a local version of Citytv in 2002, but beginning to air CHUM-provided programming on September 1, 2001) and launched a new station in Victoria known as CIVI-TV. The launch of the new outlets, along with a major series of affiliation and ownership changes in the Vancouver–Victoria market in September 2001, caused KVOS to be displaced by CIVI from its long-time home on channel 12 on many Vancouver-area cable systems, as well as losing Citytv as a source of programming.

The station came under the ownership of Clear Channel Communications (now iHeartMedia) in 2003, following that company's purchase of Ackerley. On November 16, 2006, Clear Channel announced that it would be selling its entire television division, including KVOS-TV, after being bought by private equity firms. On April 20, 2007, Clear Channel entered into an agreement to sell its entire television stations group to Providence Equity Partners' Newport Television. Providence Equity initially announced that it would not keep KVOS or KFTY in Santa Rosa, California; instead, those stations were to be resold to LK Station Group. However, LK could not obtain financing, so KVOS remained with Newport. (KFTY was eventually sold to High Plains Broadcasting, with Newport operating the station; it is now owned today by Innovate Corp., as KEMO-TV.)

In 2008, KVOS filed an application to the FCC to build its digital facility in Granite Falls in Snohomish County. (48°08′09″N 121°58′56″W) The proposed location would have provided city-grade coverage of most of the Seattle area while remaining within 15 miles (24 km) of Bellingham, as required by FCC rules. However, it would have significantly diminished its reach into Canada. Presently, KVOS provides grade B coverage of Seattle's northern suburbs (such as Everett, Edmonds, Bothell and Lynnwood), but just misses Seattle itself. This application was dismissed on July 16, 2009.

In January 2010, KVOS swapped channel positions (now on channel 30) with TSN on Shaw Cable in Metro Vancouver. In Vancouver, KVOS is not included on Shaw's "basic" line-up, but is included as channel 30 on Shaw's "classic" and "digital" line-ups. In Victoria, KVOS is included only on Shaw's "digital" line-up, on channel 69.

In October 2010, KVOS was added to Comcast's digital lineup on channel 72 in the Seattle–Tacoma area. This is the first time in 20 years that the station has been able to be seen in Seattle proper. This also marks the first time KVOS has been viewed in parts of Southwest Washington and Gray's Harbor coastal communities of Aberdeen and Hoquiam.

=== MeTV affiliation and added subchannels ===
The station became an affiliate of the classic television network MeTV on April 25, 2011. Later, TheCoolTV was added as a subchannel of KVOS on August 18, 2011. Unlike the main 12.1 feed, the 12.2 feed was not carried on any Canadian cable system. In January 2014, TheCoolTV was dropped in favor of Movies!.

Newport agreed to sell KVOS to OTA Broadcasting, LLC, a company controlled by Michael Dell's MSD Capital, in December 2011. The deal created a duopoly in the Seattle market with KFFV. OTA Broadcasting assumed control of KVOS on March 6, 2012. As a result of this sale, most of KVOS' staff was laid off, and most of the operations staff were moved to Seattle.

In September 2013, subchannel 12.3 was added, airing Canadian Punjabi language specialty channel Sur Sagar TV. The latter was dropped in mid-2015, and the feed went dark until September 5, 2016, when it started broadcasting Heroes & Icons (H&I).

On March 12, 2015, the main feed of KVOS had adopted to KFFV's 44.6 feed, the branding itself had been switched from MeTV KVOS to MeTV Seattle while the ident was MeTV KVOS-KFFV. Advertising was also shared between KVOS and KFFV. Due to WeatherNation TV previously airing on KFFV, Comcast identified the station as KFFVVW on its on-screen guide.

=== Sale to Weigel Broadcasting ===
Weigel Broadcasting agreed to acquire KVOS-TV and KFFV, along with KAXT-CD and KTLN-TV in San Francisco, in a $23.2 million deal on October 18, 2017, giving Weigel control of both of its MeTV affiliates in the Puget Sound region. The sale was closed on January 15, 2018, with KVOS and sister station KFFV now under Weigel ownership.

Former logo from 2018 to 2024 (now on DT8) and KFFV-DT3.

On January 17, 2018, H&I became KVOS's primary network and moved to subchannel 12.1, MeTV was relocated to subchannel 12.3 and new offering Decades was added to subchannel 12.4. KVOS' lineup expanded once more on September 3, 2018, when Start TV was added to subchannel 12.5. MeTV+ was added to subchannel 12.6 on September 27, 2021. On March 28, 2022 Story Television launched on subchannel 12.7.

In April 2019, the CRTC approved a request by Shaw Cable in Kelowna, British Columbia, to add KVOS-DT3 to its systems on a discretionary basis. Shaw felt that the aforementioned switch to Heroes & Icons was at odds with its authorization to carry the programming feed with MeTV programming. There was no objection from the only local station in the market (which, however, is owned by a corporate sibling).

=== 2024 switch to Univision ===
During the 2023 holiday season, Weigel quietly updated the station's website to reflect Univision would move to KVOS's main channel from Sinclair Broadcast Group's KUNS-TV (channel 51), which became an affiliate of The CW on January 1, 2024. As a result, H&I moved from subchannel 12.1 to subchannel 12.8. With KVOS's unique status, Univision's domestic schedule became available over-the-air in Vancouver, Victoria, and southwest British Columbia for the first time; Univision has a partnership with TLN to operate a licensed specialty channel, Univision Canada, featuring its programming.

== Programming ==
Until January 14, 2018, KVOS ran a variety of religious and paid programs, as well as other features between shows including On Scene and MeEvents.

KVOS has produced a variety of local shows over the years. The religious program Anchor first aired in 1968 with host, Pastor Leonard Ericksen. Anchor ran for 30 years, becoming one of the longest running shows of its kind on television. KVOS also produced many news, feature, public affairs, and informational programs as well. The 10:30 Report, Weeks End and Cana West helped launch the careers of well known names such as Andy Anderson and Al Swift, who both went on to successful careers in politics. Some other feature programs have included Kids Stuff, Pacific Style, Pacific Issues, Sports Probe, To Serve and Protect and Red's Classic Theatre with famed B.C. radio personality Red Robinson from 1989 to 2001. Another famous B.C. radio personality, Jack Cullen, hosted Owl Prowl Television Theatre in the 1950s: two reels of footage from that show are held by the City of Vancouver Archives.

During the 1970s and 1980s, KVOS ran a number of British comedy programs each evening, such as On the Buses, The Benny Hill Show, Dave Allen at Large and The Two Ronnies. It was also the only non-PBS (and only commercial) station in the U.S. to air Doctor Who from 1983 to 1993.

=== News programming ===
On the morning of May 21, 1990, NewsView began broadcasts, originally starting as a half-hour show. NewsView featured a variety of local and regional news, sports, and weather for northwest Washington and the border communities of British Columbia. The first anchor was Cyndy Glenn, followed by Michele Higgins, Susan Cowden, Crystal King, Cara Buckingham, and Ty Ray. Reporters included Jeff Wyngaert, Amy Cloud, Dave Sienko and Joe Bates, while weather duties were covered (in the early years) by Jeff Kelly and Dave George, then Dan Leniczek, Dave Sienko, and Greg Otterholt. The newscast debuted at 6:30 a.m., and eventually expanded to a 90-minute show from 6:30 to 8 a.m. Due to low advertising revenues, however, KVOS ended NewsView on January 23, 2007, after 16½ years on the air. Various syndicated programming replaced NewsView in the 6:30–8 a.m. time slots. Alongside NewsView, KVOS also broadcast hourly weather updates and local forecasts at the top of every hour, under the title WeatherView; these updates were introduced in the 1980s, and ended by the mid 2000s decade.

KVOS began airing Northwest Notebook, hosted by Ty Ray, in February 2007. The show featured interviews with newsmakers from Northwest Washington and the Lower Mainland. Ray also hosted Daily Planner, a community calendar that aired six times a day. It has since gone off the air.

== Technical information ==
=== Subchannels ===
The station's signal is multiplexed:

Subchannels of KVOS-TV
Subchannel	Res.	Short name	Programming
12.1	720p	KVOS-HD	Univision
12.2	480i	MOVIES	Movies!
12.3	480i	MeTV	MeTV (KFFV)
12.4	480i	CATCHY	Catchy Comedy
12.5	480i	START	Start TV
12.6	480i	MeTV+	MeTV+
12.7	480i	STORY	Story Television
12.8	480i	HEROES	Heroes & Icons (KFFV)
12.9	720p	TOONS	MeTV Toons

Simulcast of subchannels of another station

=== Analog-to-digital conversion ===
KVOS-TV shut down its analog signal, over VHF channel 12, on February 17, 2009, as part of the federally mandated transition from analog to digital television (which Congress had moved the previous month to June 12). The station's digital signal remained on its pre-transition UHF channel 35, using virtual channel 12.

=== 600 MHz auction ===
As result of the FCC's 600 MHz auction, KVOS moved to channel 14 due to spectrum repacking on October 19, 2019.
