= Channel 49 low-power TV stations in the United States =

The following low-power television stations broadcast on digital or analog channel 49 in the United States:

- K49IT-D in Hagerman, Idaho, to move to channel 18
- K49KV-D in Stemilt, etc., Washington, to move to channel 17
- K49LJ-D in Casper, Wyoming, to move to channel 22
- KRLB-LD in Richland, etc., Washington, to move to channel 29

The following television stations, which are no longer licensed, formerly broadcast on digital or analog channel 49:

- K49AT in Vernal, etc., Utah
- K49BB-D in Follett, Texas
- K49CU in Walker, Minnesota
- K49DV in Beeville-Refugio, Texas
- K49EA-D in Crowley Lake, California
- K49EK in Santa Barbara, California
- K49ES in Carlsbad, New Mexico
- K49FC in St. Louis, Missouri
- K49GB in Emery, Utah
- K49GD in Spanish Fork, Utah
- K49GT in Snyder, Texas
- K49HV in Martinez, California
- K49IL-D in Tecolote, New Mexico
- K49KF-D in Los Alamos/Espanola, New Mexico
- K49KQ in Little Falls, Minnesota
- KBSC-LP in Brookings, Oregon
- KTLD-LP in Odessa, Texas
- KYLU-LP in Lubbock, Texas
- W49AP in Roanoke, Virginia
- W49CL in Miami, Florida
- WCKV-LP in Clarksville, etc., Tennessee
- WCYA-LD in Midland, Michigan
- WEEJ-LD in Jacksonville, Illinois
- WOCH-CD in Chicago, Illinois
- WTBL-CD in Lenoir, North Carolina
- WXID-LP in Marietta, Georgia
