= Channel 49 digital TV stations in the United States =

The following television stations broadcast on digital channel 49 in the United States:

- K49IT-D in Hagerman, Idaho, to move to channel 18
- K49KV-D in Stemilt, etc., Washington, to move to channel 17
- K49LJ-D in Casper, Wyoming, to move to channel 22
- KRLB-LD in Richland, etc., Washington, to move to channel 29

The following stations, which are no longer licensed, formerly broadcast on digital channel 49:

- K49BB-D in Follett, Texas
- K49EA-D in Crowley Lake, California
- K49IL-D in Tecolote, New Mexico
- K49KF-D in Los Alamos/Espanola, New Mexico
- WCYA-LD in Midland, Michigan
- WEEJ-LD in Jacksonville, Illinois
- WOCH-CD in Chicago, Illinois
- WTBL-CD in Lenoir, North Carolina
