= WTBL =

WTBL may refer to:

- WTBL-LD, a low-power television station (channel 31, virtual 51) licensed to serve Biloxi, Mississippi, United States
- WTBL-CD, a defunct low-power television station (channel 49) formerly licensed to serve Lenoir, North Carolina, United States
- WMGG, a radio station (1470 AM) licensed to serve Egypt Lake, Florida, United States, which held the call sign WTBL from 1998 to 2000
- WMTA, a radio station (1380 AM) licensed to serve Central City, Kentucky, United States, which held the call sign WTBL from 1988 to 1994
