= WTBC-LP =

Television station in Tallahassee, Florida (1988–2011)

- Tallahassee, Florida; United States
- Channels: Analog: 65 (UHF)

Programming
- Affiliations: ACTS; FamilyNet; Worship Network; Total Living Network

Ownership
- Owner: Temple Baptist Church, Inc.

History
- Founded: November 12, 1986 (construction permit granted)
- First air date: May 29, 1988
- Last air date: 2011
- Former call signs: W65BG (1986–1995)

Technical information
- Licensing authority: FCC
- Facility ID: 65170
- Class: TX
- ERP: 16.9 kW
- HAAT: 191 m (627 ft)
- Transmitter coordinates: 30°29′17.1″N 84°16′47.1″W

Links
- Public license information: LMS

WTBC-LP (channel 65) was a low-power religious television station in Tallahassee, Florida, United States. The station was owned by Temple Baptist Church, Inc. As W65BG, it was affiliated with the religious network ACTS. As WTBC-LP, it was affiliated with FamilyNet, The Worship Network, and the Total Living Network.

On February 15, 2013, the station's license was canceled by the Federal Communications Commission.
