= Channel 49 virtual TV stations in the United States =

The following television stations operate on virtual channel 49 in the United States:

- K07EJ-D in Townsend, Montana
- K07JG-D in Glasgow, Montana
- K10JK-D in Hinsdale, Montana
- K12XA-D in Abilene, Texas
- K12XJ-D in Modesto, California
- K17OK-D in Snowmass Village, Colorado
- K18EL-D in Newberg/Tigard, Oregon
- K19MI-D in Salem, Oregon
- K20DD-D in Albany, etc., Oregon
- K20EH-D in Hood River, Oregon
- K20NE-D in North Platte, Nebraska
- K22KC-D in The Dalles, Oregon
- K23DB-D in La Grande, Oregon
- K27NZ-D in Longview, Washington
- K29LW-D in Rockaway Beach, Oregon
- K29MK-D in Deming, New Mexico
- K33OP-D in Helena, Montana
- K36CX-D in Boulder, Montana
- K49LJ-D in Casper, Wyoming
- KIFR in Visalia, California
- KMQV-LD in Rochester, Minnesota
- KMYA-DT in Camden, Arkansas
- KMYA-LD in Sheridan, Arkansas
- KPDS-LD in Wolcott, Indiana
- KPDX in Vancouver, Washington
- KPJO-LD in Pittsburg, Kansas
- KPXB-TV in Conroe, Texas
- KRBK in Osage Beach, Missouri
- KSAO-LD in Sacramento, California
- KSTR-DT in Irving, Texas
- KTKA-TV in Topeka, Kansas
- KTWM-LD in Lawton, Oklahoma
- KUBN-LD in Madras, Oregon
- KZAK-LD in Boise, Idaho
- W19DP-D in La Crosse, Wisconsin
- WAAA-LD in Valparaiso, Indiana
- WAQP in Saginaw, Michigan
- WBLZ-LD in Syracuse, New York
- WBPI-CD in Augusta, Georgia
- WCIX in Springfield, Illinois
- WDKA in Paducah, Kentucky
- WDNN-CD in Dalton, Georgia
- WEAO in Akron, Ohio
- WEDW in Bridgeport, Connecticut
- WEPH in Tupelo, Mississippi
- WGBD-LD in Green Bay, Wisconsin
- WIPB in Muncie, Indiana
- WJJN-LD in Dothan, Alabama
- WKIZ-LD in Key West, Florida
- WLHY-LD in Lebanon-Harrisburg-York-Lancaster, Pennsylvania
- WLYH in Red Lion, Pennsylvania
- WMLW-TV in Racine, Wisconsin
- WNYO-TV in Buffalo, New York
- WODP-LD in Fort Wayne, Indiana
- WONO-CD in Syracuse, etc., New York
- WPXL-TV in New Orleans, Louisiana
- WPXV-TV in Norfolk, Virginia
- WQDH-LD in Wilmington, North Carolina
- WQEO-LD in Memphis, Tennessee
- WRET-TV in Spartanburg, South Carolina
- WRMD-CD in Tampa, Florida
- WRXY-TV in Tice, Florida
- WTLH in Bainbridge, Georgia
- WUEO-LD in Macon, Georgia
- WVCC-LD in Westmoreland, New Hampshire
- WWDD-LD in Baltimore, Maryland
- WWTD-LD in Washington, D.C.

The following stations, which are no longer licensed, formerly operated on virtual channel 49:

- K08QJ-D in Rio Grande City, Texas
- K29MU-D in Coos Bay, Oregon
- W50EQ-D in Lumberton, North Carolina
- WTBL-CD in Lenoir, North Carolina
