= KFFV =

Television station in Seattle

- Seattle–Tacoma, Washington; United States
- City: Seattle, Washington
- Channels: Digital: 16 (UHF); Virtual: 44
- Branding: MeTV Seattle

Programming
- Affiliations: 44.1: MeTV; for others, see § Subchannels

Ownership
- Owner: Weigel Broadcasting; (KFFV-TV LLC)
- Sister stations: KVOS-TV

History
- First air date: January 1, 1999
- Former call signs: KHCV (1999–2009); KPST (2009–2010)
- Former channel numbers: Analog: 45 (UHF, 1999–2009); Digital: 44 (UHF, until 2019)
- Former affiliations: Military Channel; AMGTV; Jewelry TV (1999–2009); Dark (2009–2010); Infomercials (2010–201?); Evine (201?–2018)
- Call sign meaning: Channel Forty-Five (former analog/virtual channel allocation)

Technical information
- Licensing authority: FCC
- Facility ID: 49264
- ERP: 260 kW
- HAAT: 259 m (850 ft)
- Transmitter coordinates: 47°36′55.6″N 122°18′33.8″W
- Translator(s): KVOS-TV 12.3 Bellingham

Links
- Public license information: Public file; LMS
- Website: KFFV page on MeTV.com

KFFV (channel 44) is a television station in Seattle, Washington, United States, airing programming from MeTV. It is owned by Weigel Broadcasting alongside Bellingham-licensed Univision affiliate KVOS-TV (channel 12). The two stations share studios on Third Avenue South in Seattle; KFFV's transmitter is located on Capitol Hill east of downtown.

== History ==
=== Early years ===
The former KHCV call letters were assigned by the Federal Communications Commission (FCC) with a construction permit on October 2, 1989. The station signed on the air on January 1, 1999, on Channel 45 after many permit extensions.

==== Channel launches ====
During the week of August 11, 2006, KHCV started carrying Azteca América on its analog channel 45 and on its digital channel 44.2.

On December 20, 2006, Navarre's FUNimation Entertainment announced that the Funimation Channel would be broadcast on KHCV 44.3.

On March 1, 2007, KHCV started broadcasting content from GNF Entertainment Network on its digital subchannels 44.3 and 44.4. 44.3 carried GNF "Game & Music" and 44.4 carried GNF "Movie".

==== Network changes ====
The analog broadcast (UHF 45) had been exclusively Azteca América, while the Comcast broadcast of this channel (Channel 15) was Jewelry TV. On September 10, 2007, analog UHF channel 45 carried the same Jewelry TV content as digital UHF channel 44.1 and Comcast channel 15.

On October 15, 2007, programming from AAT Television started broadcasting on digital channel 44.3.

On April 19, 2008, America One content on channel 44.4 was replaced by Sportsman Channel; it was later replaced with MBC-D, a Korean television channel.

On November 13, 2008, KHCV filed for a request for silent state for its analog signal.

On September 28, 2009, KHCV became KPST. On December 22, 2009, KPST went silent. The station was evicted from its studios and its STL link could not be operated from the new location. KPST hoped to have the station up and running within a few weeks. The station resumed broadcasting on February 4, 2010. During that time, KPST aired only infomercials on its main channel, 24 hours a day.

=== As KFFV-TV ===
KFFV's logo as "K44," used circa 2011

The call letters were changed to KFFV on November 15, 2010. The station was purchased at bankruptcy auction by OTA Broadcasting on June 30, 2011; the sale was completed on October 12.

KFFV's logo used circa 2013

In January 2013, WeatherNation was added to channel 44.5. It was later replaced by Cozi TV.

On March 12, 2015, KFFV's sister station KVOS-TV's main channel, MeTV, had "soft-launched" to sub-channel 44.6.

Weigel Broadcasting agreed to acquire KFFV and KVOS-TV, along with KAXT-CD and KTLN-TV in San Francisco, in a $23.2 million deal on October 18, 2017. The sale was closed on January 15, 2018, with KFFV and KVOS now under Weigel ownership.

On January 17, 2018, Weigel terminated KFFV's carriage agreements with the networks aired under OTA ownership, and switched to a near-duplication of KVOS' services, with MeTV replacing Evine on channel 44.1, Movies! replacing Azteca América on 44.2, and AAT replaced by H&I on 44.3 (AAT moved to KUSE-LD4). Cozi returned to Seattle on two other Seattle area stations: low-power TV station KYMU-LD in 2019 and on KIRO-TV's third digital subchannel in 2020. Azteca left the air at the end of 2022 without ever finding a new Seattle affiliate, with KBS World's coverage expanding on local cable channel KO-AM TV, which it already affiliated with.

== Technical information ==
=== Subchannels ===
The station's signal is multiplexed:

Subchannels of KFFV
Subchannel	Res.	Short name	Programming
44.1	720p	MeTV	MeTV
44.2	480i	MOVIES	Movies!
44.3	480i	HEROES	Heroes & Icons
44.4	480i	CATCHY	Catchy Comedy
44.5	480i	MeTV+	MeTV+
44.6	480i	STORY	Story Television
44.7	480i	TOONS	MeTV Toons
44.8	480i	WEST	WEST
44.12	480i	EMLW	OnTV4U (Infomercials)
