= Channel 10 branded TV stations in the United States =

The following television stations in the United States brand as channel 10 (though neither using virtual channel 10 nor broadcasting on physical RF channel 10):

- KFOL-CD in Houma, Louisiana
- WABG-DT2 in Greenwood, Mississippi
- WBTS-CD in Nashua, New Hampshire, serving Boston, Massachusetts
- WCJB-DT2 in Gainesville, Florida
- WRXY-TV in Tice, Florida
- WTVY-DT3 in Dothan, Alabama
- WVVA-DT2 in Bluefield, West Virginia
