= KTLN-TV =

Television station in Palo Alto, California

- Palo Alto–San Francisco–Oakland–; San Jose, California; United States
- City: Palo Alto, California (Note: Originally licensed to Novato, California; moved to Palo Alto in 2018.)
- Channels: Digital: 22 (UHF), shared with KAXT-CD; Virtual: 68
- Branding: H&I Bay Area; MeTV Bay Area (68.2)

Programming
- Affiliations: 68.1: Heroes & Icons; for others, see § Subchannels

Ownership
- Owner: Weigel Broadcasting; (KTLN-TV LLC)
- Sister stations: KAXT-CD

History
- Founded: 1990
- First air date: July 15, 1998
- Former call signs: KWOK (1990–1999)
- Former channel numbers: Analog: 68 (UHF, 1998–2009); Digital: 47 (UHF, 2005–2018)
- Former affiliations: Total Living Network (1998–2019)
- Call sign meaning: "Total Living Network" (former affiliation)

Technical information
- Licensing authority: FCC
- Facility ID: 49153
- ERP: 15 kW
- HAAT: 688 m (2,257 ft)
- Transmitter coordinates: 37°29′57″N 121°52′20″W

Links
- Public license information: Public file; LMS
- Website: KTLN FCC disclosures/schedule page on Heroes & Icons website

KTLN-TV (channel 68) is a television station licensed to Palo Alto, California, United States, serving the San Francisco Bay Area with programming from the classic television network Heroes & Icons. It is owned by Weigel Broadcasting alongside low-power, Class A Catchy Comedy station KAXT-CD (channel 1). The two stations share studios on Pelican Way in San Rafael, and transmitter facilities on Mount Allison.

Even though KTLN-TV is licensed as a full-power station, it shares spectrum with KAXT-CD, whose low-power broadcasting radius does not cover all of the San Francisco Bay Area. Therefore, it relies on cable and satellite carriage to reach the entire market. However, KTLN-TV shares MeTV with independent station KPYX's (channel 44) third subchannel, which has a stronger signal than KTLN.

== History ==
Originally, Christian Communications of Chicagoland (then-owners of WCFC-TV, now Ion Television owned-and-operated station WCPX-TV) owned KTLN outright. It was formerly licensed to the Marin County community of Novato. CCC filed to sell the station to OTA Broadcasting, a company controlled by Michael Dell's MSD Capital, in June 2011. The sale was completed on October 6, 2011; as part of the deal, CCC continued to operate KTLN via a local marketing agreement (LMA).

Weigel Broadcasting agreed to acquire KTLN-TV and KAXT-CD, along with KVOS-TV and KFFV in Seattle, from OTA Broadcasting in a $23.2 million deal on October 18, 2017. The station was temporarily off the air as of June 2018.

The station sale to Weigel was completed on April 15, 2019. At midnight on April 17, KTLN returned on the air carrying high definition signals of Heroes & Icons on 68.1, and MeTV on 68.2.

== Technical information ==
=== Subchannels ===
Subchannel of KAXT-CD and KTLN-TV
License	Channel	Res.	Short name	Programming
KAXT-CD	1.2	480i	KAXT-SD	Catchy Comedy
KTLN-TV	68.1	720p	KTLN-HD	Heroes & Icons
KTLN-TV	68.2	720p	MeTV	MeTV
KTLN-TV	68.3	480i	Story	Story Television
KTLN-TV	68.4	480i	MeTV+	MeTV+
KTLN-TV	68.5	480i	Quest	Quest
KTLN-TV	68.6	480i	TOONS	MeTV Toons
KTLN-TV	68.7	480i	WEST	WEST

=== Analog-to-digital conversion ===
KTLN-TV shut down its analog signal, over UHF channel 68, on June 12, 2009, as part of the federally mandated transition from analog to digital television. The station's digital signal remained on its pre-transition UHF channel 47, using virtual channel 68.
