= To Serve and Protect =

1993 Canadian reality crime television series

- Netflix logo
- Also known as: Under Arrest
- Genre: Documentary
- Directed by: Dan Forrer
- Country of origin: Canada
- Original language: English
- No. of series: ?
- No. of episodes: 65

Production
- Producers: Dwayne Mitchell and Dan Forrer
- Running time: 60 minutes
- Production company: Mainstreet Pictures

Original release
- Network: KVOS-TV; A-Channel
- Release: 1993 – 2009

To Serve and Protect, also known as Under Arrest on streaming services, is a Canadian reality crime television series that shadows city police in Edmonton, Alberta, Winnipeg, Manitoba, Vancouver, Penticton, New Westminster, Summerland, and Surrey, British Columbia. A few episodes venture to Las Vegas, and Memphis. The program premiered on KVOS-TV in 1993 using footage shot in 1991 and 1992. It is based on the American television series Cops.

== History ==
The program was created by Dwayne Mitchell and Dan Forrer for KF Media Inc., debuting in 1993 on KVOS-TV in Bellingham, Washington. Most viewers of the hour-long program were located in the Vancouver, British Columbia region. Mitchell filmed five hundred "ride alongs" with the police in the program's first two years. KVOS aired the program on Sunday nights in the 1990s and weeknights at midnight in the early 2000s. Among those featured on the program were future Edmonton Police whistleblower Derek Huff. With a new audience on Netflix, the program is today considered something of a camp classic for its dramatic characters and 1990s aesthetic. As of 2023, 26 episodes are available for streaming on Peacock.

After the first season, the Vancouver Police Department refused to allow the production company on ride alongs after they refused to blur the faces of suspects. Vancouver police constable Anne Drenan said Forrer's "negative attitude after police requested the show black out faces led to the police board deciding ... not to participate further." Drennan said police wanted to protect the identities of people who were arrested but not charged. The provincial government ruled that broadcasting a suspect's face without their consent was illegal.

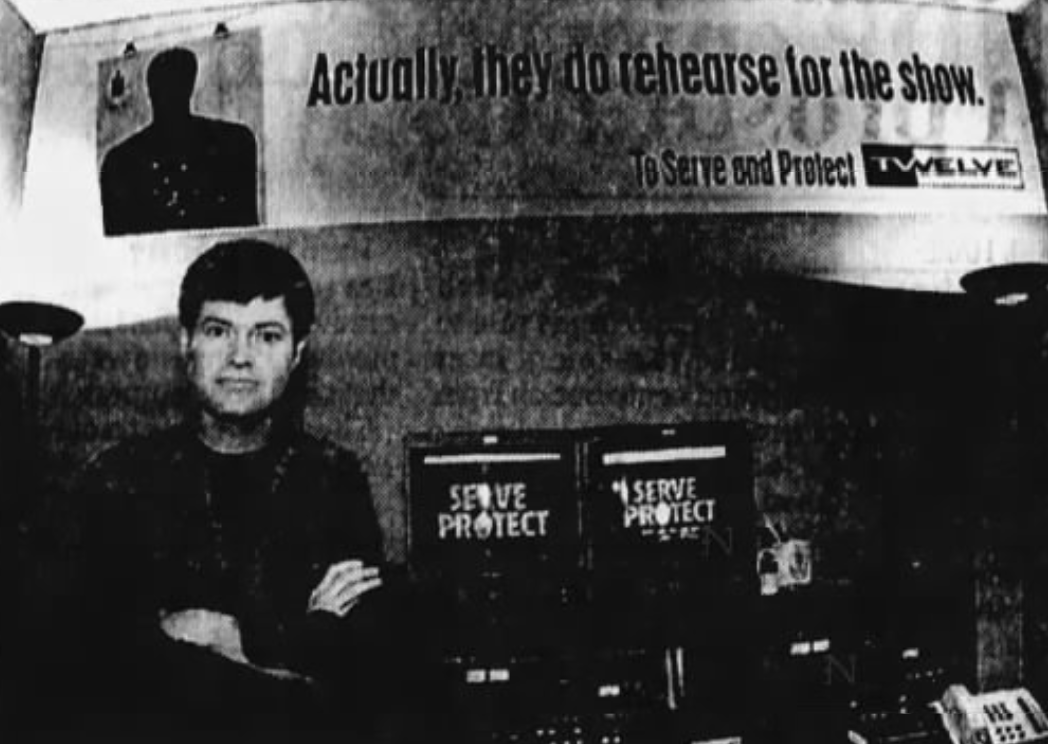
Dan Forrer, creator of the Netflix series Under Arrest, originally known as To Serve and Protect.

The original version of To Serve and Protect was cancelled in 1995. Executive producer Dan Forrer blamed "senior officers in the Vancouver police department and RCMP." The final episode featured footage that, according to Forrer, "Vancouver police Chief Ray Canuel did want the public to see." He claimed the police chief wanted to "kill the show's access to ride alongs with officers in patrol cars because the original approval had been given by the previous police chief, Bill Marshall." Several instances of excessive force and illegal maneuvers were captured on film and aired as if routine. The new police chief was mortified to see the program showcase some of the brutal tactics routinely employed by his force, potentially casting them in a negative light.

Forrer and Mitchell secured access to other police departments and a new round of episodes were made starting in 1997. The RCMP of Surrey, British Columbia, was featured prominently. Located thirty minutes east of Vancouver, the suburb was famous for mullets, mustaches, and alcohol-related incidents. People have compared the area to Heavy Metal Parking Lot and the Trailer Park Boys. Some of the program's most memorable moments occur during Surrey episodes, something that led to the Surrey City Council revoking permission to film within the city. The city council also contacted KVOS to pull all Surrey-based episodes from its rerun package. "They are broadcasting the same incidents over and over, so people are getting the impression that this is still happening," said councillor Judy Villeneuve. She felt that the program unfairly portrayed Surrey as "crime-ridden." Forrer was outraged. "We are not going to acquiesce to the suggestion that we not show something – that's ludicrous. If they are putting the screws to the police on To Serve and Protect, then what else are they telling them to do?" However, the Surrey RCMP themselves were "troubled about the show for months, and suspended participation last November [1997]." The department didn't cite specific concerns but said the program "doesn't present a balanced view of police work, but instead is skewed toward the more sensational incidents."

Forrer said the show was unrehearsed, but conceded that the program was formatted for maximum television impact. "We just get in a police car and go wherever they are dispatched. I'm not saying that what we show is 100 per cent of reality but neither is what you see on BCTV News. There are people on the show two or three times, and they're people who are always getting in trouble and causing us all a lot of grief. My sympathy for these people? There isn't any ... It comes down to bleeding hearts and political correctness. They don't like the fact that we embarrass or put some heat on some of these crooks that are on the show."

== Alternate Versions ==
Dwayne Mitchell sold a syndicated, half-hour version of the program to American markets in 1997 under the title Mounties: True Stories of the Royal Canadian Police. It reportedly aired in eighty regional markets including Elko, Nevada, St. Joseph, Missouri, Salina, Kansas, Tucson, Arizona, West Palm Beach, Florida, and Agana, Guam. It generally aired around two in the morning. Forrer referred to his show as "filler" for the American market.

This show is available on the video-on-demand streaming services Netflix, Peacock, The Roku Channel, Pluto TV, Crackle, Tubi and Amazon Freevee (the version on the latter six services provided by FilmRise) under the title Under Arrest with episodes condensed from their original hour length to eight "Best of" seasons with each episode running 20 minutes.

=== Episodes on Netflix ===
Series	Episode No.	Episode Title
1	1	My Name is Mr. Duck
1	2	Put Some Clothes On
1	3	Wrong Side of the Road
1	4	Driving on Three Wheels
1	5	Mud Wrestlers
1	6	Bullets Through Glass
1	7	Who Needs a Uniform?
1	8	Hogtied Husband
2	1	Wash Your Hands
2	2	That's My Corner
2	3	Don't Resist!
2	4	You're Going To Get A Headache
2	5	I Hate Waterbeds
2	6	First Degree Black Belt
2	7	Everybody Likes Beer
2	8	No Loving
3	1	Dead Fish
3	2	Drunk Puppet
3	3	It's Alive!
3	4	Got A Warrant?
3	5	It's A Big Joke
3	6	Just One Kiss
3	7	A Big Bite
3	8	How Many Beer?
4	1	Don't Go That Nuts
4	2	Bad Hair Day
4	3	Happy Birthday
4	4	Scrambled Eggs
4	5	Let's Boogie
4	6	Booze Recovery Team
4	7	Don't Shoot
4	8	Not Ready For Primetime

== See also ==
- COPS
- Live PD
