= KORB =

Christian alternative rock radio station in Hopland, California

- Hopland, California; United States
- Frequency: 88.7 MHz
- Branding: K-FAITH 103.1

Programming
- Format: Christian preaching

Ownership
- Owner: One Ministries, Inc.
- Sister stations: KQSL, KKPM-CD

History
- First air date: 2008
- Former call signs: KAIS (2005–2008)
- Call sign meaning: "Broken" backwards (previous branding)

Technical information
- Licensing authority: FCC
- Facility ID: 88397
- Class: A
- ERP: 13 watts
- HAAT: −331 meters (−1,086 ft)
- Transmitter coordinates: 38°58′15″N 123°6′50″W
- Translator: see below

Links
- Public license information: Public file; LMS
- Webcast: Listen live
- Website: kfaith.org

KORB (88.7 FM) is a non-commercial radio station licensed to Hopland, California, United States. KORB is owned and operated by One Ministries, Inc. which also owns and operates TV stations KQSL in Fort Bragg and KKPM-CD in Yuba City.

KORB broadcasts a Christian preaching format branded as "K-FAITH 103.1".

== History ==
This station received its original construction permit for a new FM station in Redwood Valley, California, from the Federal Communications Commission on April 25, 2005. The new station was assigned the call letters KAIS by the FCC on May 2, 2005. In December 2007, the station was granted permission to change its community of license to Hopland, California.

In October 2008, the Educational Media Foundation reached an agreement to transfer this station to One Ministries, Inc., as part of a complicated multi-station deal. The deal was approved by the FCC on November 20, 2008, and the transaction was consummated on December 9, 2008. The new owners applied to the FCC for new call letters and were assigned KORB on November 28, 2008.

In March 2009, KORB kicked off its morning show with the station's first on air DJ, Costas Schuler.

On June 1, 2022, KORB changed its format to Christian preaching, branded as "K-FAITH 103.1", fed on translator K276FY.

== Translators ==
Call sign	Frequency	City of license	FID	ERP (W)	Class	FCC info
K201HW	88.1 FM	El Paso, Texas	123360	6	D	LMS
K208GA	89.5 FM	Petaluma, California	156262	4 (horiz.), 10 (vert.)	D	LMS
K218EN	91.5 FM	Santa Rosa, California	156255	10 (horiz.), 4.5 (vert.)	D	LMS
K256BV	99.1 FM	Hopland, California	156240	11	D	LMS
K267BA	101.3 FM	Ukiah, California	84014	10	D	LMS
K276FY	103.1 FM	Santa Rosa, California	156278	10	D	LMS
