= WPXQ-TV =

Television station in Newport, Rhode Island

- Newport–Providence, Rhode Island; New Bedford, Massachusetts; United States
- City: Newport, Rhode Island (Note: Originally licensed to Block Island, Rhode Island; moved to Newport in 2018.)
- Channels: Digital: 17 (UHF), shared with WLWC; Virtual: 69

Programming
- Affiliations: 69.1: Ion Television; for others, see § Subchannels

Ownership
- Owner: Ion Media; (Ion Television License, LLC)

History
- First air date: April 2, 1992
- Former call signs: WOST-TV (1992–1998)
- Former channel numbers: Analog: 69 (UHF, 1992–2009)
- Former affiliations: Independent (1992–1996); inTV (1996–1998)
- Call sign meaning: PX for "Pax", Q to disambiguate from other stations

Technical information
- Licensing authority: FCC
- Facility ID: 50063
- ERP: 1,000 kW
- HAAT: 228 m (748 ft)
- Transmitter coordinates: 41°29′41.7″N 71°47′4.7″W

Links
- Public license information: Public file; LMS
- Website: iontelevision.com

WPXQ-TV (channel 69) is a television station licensed to Newport, Rhode Island, United States, broadcasting the Ion Television network to the Providence area. Owned by the Ion Media subsidiary of the E. W. Scripps Company, it shares transmitter facilities with former sister station WLWC (channel 28) on Champlin Hill near Ashaway.

Despite originally being licensed to Block Island, Rhode Island, WPXQ was never carried by former cable operator Block Island Cable TV. (Note: This cable company ceased operations on October 31, 2006. Since then, there has been no cable television service on the island.)

== History ==
The FCC was persuaded to allocate channel 69 (WPXQ's original analog frequency) to Block Island by Ted Robinson, an island resident, who claimed during the allocation filing process in 1984–85 that an independent TV station providing niche programming from there would serve the public interest better. Robinson subsequently ran into local opposition to tower siting, and sold out his interest to Ray Yorke, who obtained the initial construction permit. The station began broadcasting a few hours of old movies daily in 1992 using the call sign WOST-TV (meaning Ocean State Television, the original owners). By 1996, the station was owned by Paxson Communications, which had implemented their infomercials (via their inTV network) and religious programming. The station became WPXQ in 1998, and in August of that year began to run programming from the Pax TV network (later i: Independent Television; now Ion Television).

== Technical information ==
=== Subchannels ===
Subchannels of WPXQ-TV and WLWC
License	Subchannel	Res.	Short name	Programming
WPXQ-TV	69.1	720p	ION	Ion Television
WPXQ-TV	69.2	480i	Laff	Laff
WPXQ-TV	69.3	480i	BUSTED	Busted
WPXQ-TV	69.4	480i	CourtTV	Court TV
WPXQ-TV	69.5	480i	GameSho	Game Show Central
WPXQ-TV	69.6	480i	HSN	HSN
WPXQ-TV	69.8	480i	QVC	QVC
WLWC	28.1	480i	Bounce	Bounce TV

=== Analog-to-digital conversion ===
WPXQ-TV ended regular programming on its analog signal, over UHF channel 69, on June 12, 2009, the official date on which full-power television stations in the United States transitioned from analog to digital broadcasts under federal mandate. The station's digital signal remained on its pre-transition UHF channel 17, using virtual channel 69.
