= WRXY-TV =

Television station in Tice, Florida

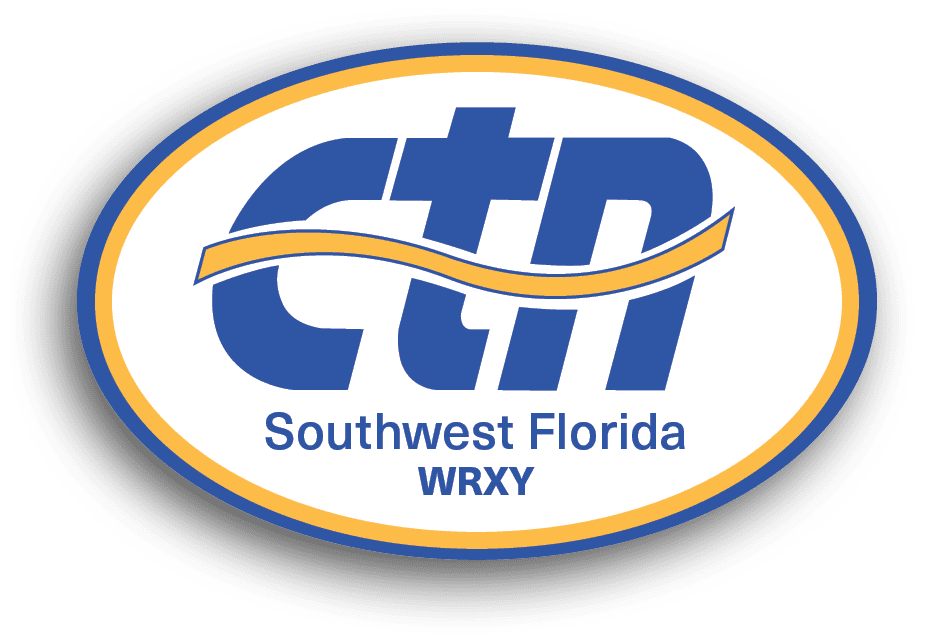
- Tice–Fort Myers–Naples, Florida; United States
- City: Tice, Florida
- Channels: Digital: 33 (UHF); Virtual: 49
- Branding: CTN Southwest Florida

Programming
- Affiliations: 49.1: CTN; for others, see § Subchannels

Ownership
- Owner: Christian Television Network; (West Coast Christian Television, Inc.)
- Sister stations: WCLF

History
- First air date: January 29, 1995
- Former channel numbers: Analog: 49 (UHF, 1995–2009)

Technical information
- Licensing authority: FCC
- Facility ID: 71580
- ERP: 1,000 kW
- HAAT: 429 m (1,407 ft)
- Transmitter coordinates: 26°47′8.7″N 81°47′45.9″W

Links
- Public license information: Public file; LMS
- Website: ctnonline.com/affiliate-stations/ctn-southwest-florida-wrxy/

WRXY-TV (channel 49) is a religious television station licensed to Tice, Florida, United States, serving the Fort Myers–Naples area. The station is owned by the Christian Television Network (CTN). WRXY-TV's studios and transmitter are located on Horseshoe Road in Punta Gorda, near the Babcock Ranch planned community. The station was formerly branded as CTN 10, in reference to its channel position on most cable systems in the market.

== History ==
The station was founded on January 29, 1995. Broadcasts were originally hosted from a barn located on a cow pasture.

== Subchannels ==
The station's signal is multiplexed:

Subchannels of WRXY-TV
Subchannel	Res.	Short name	Programming
49.1	1080i	WRXY DT	CTN
49.2	480i	SEE/Lif	CTN Lifestyle (4:3)
49.3	480i	CTNi	CTN International (4:3)
49.4	480i	BUZZR	Buzzr (4:3)
49.5	480i	Biz-TV	Biz TV

== See also ==
- Channel 10 branded TV stations in the United States
- Channel 33 digital TV stations in the United States
- Channel 49 virtual TV stations in the United States
