= WLWC =

Television station in New Bedford, Massachusetts

- New Bedford, Massachusetts; Providence, Rhode Island; United States
- City: New Bedford, Massachusetts
- Channels: Digital: 17 (UHF), shared with WPXQ-TV; Virtual: 28

Programming
- Affiliations: 28.1: Bounce TV

Ownership
- Owner: Inyo Broadcast Holdings (sale to the E. W. Scripps Company pending); (Inyo Broadcast Licenses LLC)

History
- First air date: April 14, 1997
- Former channel numbers: Analog: 28 (UHF, 1997–2008); Digital: 22 (UHF, 2005–2017)
- Former affiliations: The WB (primary 1997–2000; secondary 2000–2006); UPN (secondary 1997–2000; primary 2000–2006); The CW (2006–2017); Ion Plus (2017–2021); Court TV (2021–2026)
- Call sign meaning: Named after what is now WCMH-TV in Columbus, which stood for "WLW Columbus"

Technical information
- Licensing authority: FCC
- Facility ID: 3978
- ERP: 1,000 kW
- HAAT: 228 m (748 ft)
- Transmitter coordinates: 41°29′41.7″N 71°47′4.7″W

Links
- Public license information: Public file; LMS

WLWC (channel 28) is a television station licensed to New Bedford, Massachusetts, United States, serving the Providence, Rhode Island, area as an affiliate of Bounce TV. Owned by Inyo Broadcast Holdings, the station shares transmitter facilities with former sister WPXQ-TV (channel 69) on Champlin Hill in Ashaway, Rhode Island.

WLWC is one of two major stations (along with WLNE-TV, channel 6) that serve Providence despite being licensed to the Massachusetts side of the market.

== History ==
WLWC began broadcasting April 14, 1997, as an affiliate of The WB. It was owned by Fant Broadcasting and operated by NBC-owned WJAR (channel 10) under a local marketing agreement (LMA). For the first 27 months of The WB's existence, residents in the Providence–New Bedford market received programming from the network primarily via Boston's WLVI-TV, which had been carried on cable in Rhode Island for decades, while WJAR had a secondary affiliation with the network. The station launched with various syndicated shows as well as a WJAR-produced 10 p.m. newscast, known as TV 28 News at 10, which began airing a few months after the WPRI-TV (channel 12)-produced effort on Fox affiliate WNAC-TV (channel 64).

Fant had signed an LMA with WJAR's previous owner, Outlet Communications, on December 14, 1994, prior to Outlet's 1996 merger with NBC. Earlier in 1994, on March 18, Fant's station in Columbus, Ohio, WWHO, became the junior partner in an LMA with Outlet-owned NBC affiliate WCMH-TV. The LMA arrangement allowed channel 28 to come to the air; the station's original construction permit was granted to Metrovision Inc., a company controlled by Franklin D. Graham, on November 8, 1982. Although a site was selected in East Freetown, Massachusetts, and construction begun on a studio and transmitter, financial problems prevented channel 28 (which was assigned the call letters WFDG, referring to Graham, on December 22, 1982; it became WLWC on August 1, 1995) from signing on. After several ownership changes, Fant purchased the permit on January 3, 1995.

Although both of Fant's LMAs with Outlet were intended to expire after ten years, by the time channel 28 signed on, NBC had let it be known that it did not want to run stations outside its core owned-and-operated (O&O) group, and pushed Fant to sell WLWC and WWHO. On July 31, 1997, NBC announced a three-way swap in which Fant exchanged WLWC and WWHO to Viacom's Paramount Stations Group subsidiary, while Paramount/Viacom-owned NBC affiliate WVIT in Hartford, Connecticut, became an NBC O&O.

With the ownership change, WLWC added a secondary affiliation with UPN, and became a sister station to Boston's UPN affiliate, WSBK-TV, which until then had doubled as the UPN affiliate for Providence–New Bedford and (as with WLVI) had long been carried on Rhode Island cable systems, while WNAC-TV had a secondary affiliation with the network. WLWC's master control and some internal operations were thus relocated from WJAR's studios in Cranston to WSBK's studios in Boston, with sales and public affairs offices remaining in Providence. In addition, TV 28 News at 10 was canceled by September 1997. Channel 28 became more or less a UPN O&O in May 2000, as UPN became its primary affiliation; in addition, the station signed a deal with The WB to retain its programming on a secondary basis through what a Paramount Stations Group executive described as a "program license agreement".

For most of the television era, the FCC had not allowed common ownership of stations with overlapping city-grade signals. Just months earlier, WNAC-TV had to be sold because its previous owner, Argyle Television, had merged with Hearst Broadcasting, owner of Boston's WCVB-TV—the second time in three years that a Rhode Island station had to be sold after its owner merged with the owner of a Boston station. Due to these rules, WLWC's license was thus acquired by Straightline Communications, with WSBK operating the station through an LMA (earlier in 1997, Straightline acquired WTVX in West Palm Beach, Florida, on behalf of Paramount/Viacom's Miami–Fort Lauderdale station WBFS-TV; the company later purchased and operated WVNY in Burlington, Vermont, separately from Viacom); in 2001, Viacom bought WLWC outright.

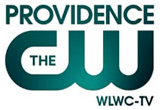
Logo used from May 5, 2017, until October 2, 2017, under the operation of OTA Broadcasting and the affiliation of The CW.

After Viacom and CBS merged in 2000, the operations of WLWC and WSBK were integrated with those of WBZ-TV at WBZ's facility on Soldiers Field Road in the Brighton section of Boston. When Viacom split into two companies in 2005, WLWC, along with the rest of Viacom's television stations, became part of CBS Corporation. On January 24, 2006, Time Warner announced that the company would merge The WB with CBS Corporation's UPN (which CBS took ownership of after the Viacom split in December 2005) to form The CW Television Network. At the same time, the new network signed a 10-year affiliation agreement with 11 of CBS' UPN stations, including WLWC. However, it was a near-certainty that WLWC would become an affiliate of The CW in any event, given that it was a dual UPN/WB affiliate.

On February 7, 2007, CBS announced it was selling WLWC and seven other stations in Austin, Texas, Salt Lake City, Utah, and West Palm Beach, Florida, to Cerberus Capital Management for $185 million. Cerberus then formed a new holding company for the stations, Four Points Media Group, who took over the operation of the stations through local marketing agreements in late-June 2007. On November 26, master control of WLWC moved from WBZ-TV to KUTV's studios on Main Street in Downtown Salt Lake City. The entire group deal officially closed on January 10, 2008. Nexstar Broadcasting Group took over the operations of all of the Four Points stations in March 2009. At one point, the station had studios on State Street in Downtown Providence.

On June 30, 2010, WLWC invoked the FCC's network non-duplication rule. This resulted in Comcast blacking out prime time CW programming on WLVI-TV in Fall River, Massachusetts. This did not impact the rest of the communities in Bristol County, due to the fact that WLVI-TV still has "significantly viewed" status across Bristol County. However, WLWC filed a request with the FCC to exempt Fall River from significantly viewed status. On August 2, 2010, the station added LATV on a new second digital subchannel. This is also seen on Comcast digital channels 299 and 702, Verizon FiOS digital channel 469, and Cox digital channel 809.

On September 8, 2011, Four Points Media announced the sale of its television group, including WLWC, to Sinclair Broadcast Group. Sinclair was expected to begin operating the stations via a local marketing agreement following antitrust approval and prior to the closing expected in the first quarter of 2012. At the time of the sale, Sinclair owned only one other television station in New England: Portland, Maine's CBS affiliate WGME-TV. However, Sinclair was also a former owner of Springfield, Massachusetts' ABC affiliate WGGB-TV. The deal was completed on January 3, 2012. However, just over a year later on January 11, 2013, Sinclair announced that it would sell WLWC to Fairfax, Virginia–based OTA Broadcasting, LLC (a company controlled by Michael Dell's MSD Capital), for $13.75 million. This was Sinclair's second divestiture after the announcement of the sale of WLAJ in Lansing, Michigan, in October 2012. The FCC granted its approval of the sale on March 19. The deal was completed on April 2. Sinclair would later re-enter the Providence market with its purchase of WJAR on August 24, 2014, as part of the merger of Media General (WJAR's owner) and LIN Media (WPRI's owner), which required Media General to spin off either WJAR or WPRI (the latter included the LMA with WNAC).

OTA Broadcasting was created specifically to take advantage of the FCC's then-upcoming spectrum reallocation incentive auction, and had no interest in the long run in running their stations, including WLWC, as going concerns. The station's physical spectrum was considered valuable in the crowded New England region, and OTA sought to sell it off.

=== Spectrum sale and channel sharing agreement ===
In the FCC's incentive auction, WLWC's spectrum was sold by OTA Broadcasting for $125,932,367, which then indicated that it would enter into a post-auction channel sharing agreement. It was one of the few successful spectrum sales for an OTA-owned station, and its only successful full-power sale. On August 7, 2017, Nexstar Media Group (which had re-entered the market earlier that year following its merger with Media General) announced that it would acquire WLWC's non-spectrum assets for $4.1 million; in a statement, Nexstar said that the station's CW affiliation would complement its existing ownership and operation of WPRI-TV and WNAC-TV. WLWC entered into a channel sharing agreement with Ion Television owned-and-operated station WPXQ-TV on September 1, 2017; the station then announced that it would "cease broadcasting on October 2, 2017 at 12:30 p.m. and begin channel sharing operations with another station, but will still be found on virtual channel 28". Following the commencement of the channel sharing, channel 28.1 began carrying Ion Plus, also dropping its other subchannels in the process; CW programming relocated to WNAC's second digital subchannel, sending MyNetworkTV to WPRI's second digital subchannel. On December 5, 2017, Ion exercised an option to buy the WLWC license for $150,000; the deal was made possible by the new Trump administration and an FCC which removed ownership rules that required "eight voices" (or separate station owners) in a market following the formation of a duopoly. Ion also entered into a shared services agreement, retroactive to October 1, to operate WLWC. The sale closed in February 2018.

On September 24, 2020, the E. W. Scripps Company agreed to buy Ion Media for $2.65 billion. To get FCC approval for the transaction, 23 Ion Television stations, including WLWC, were sold by Scripps to Inyo Broadcast Holdings. The transaction was closed on January 7, 2021.

On February 28, 2021, the station became an affiliate of Court TV after Ion Plus was shut down.

In February 2026, the station became an affiliate of Bounce TV.

Scripps announced its repurchase of all Inyo stations on February 26, 2026.

== Programming ==
As a primary WB affiliate, WLWC aired Kids' WB programming; after the station became a primary UPN affiliate, the block was dropped, as UPN also carried a children's programming block (Disney's One Too). Kids' WB was not picked up again after UPN canceled its own children's block in 2003. The block, which was replaced with The CW4Kids in 2008, returned to WLWC when the station began airing CW programming. (The CW4Kids was renamed Toonzai in 2010 and then Vortexx in 2012; the block ended in 2014.)

On April 1, 2002, WBZ-TV added its weekday morning newscast and Sports Final to WLWC's lineup; a year later, WSBK-TV's Red Sox This Week was also added to the schedule. This was done to serve viewers inconvenienced by Cox's removal of WBZ from its Rhode Island systems. In 2004, WLWC dropped the morning newscast; in its place, on September 13, the station, along with seven other Viacom-owned UPN stations, began airing the nationally syndicated morning program The Daily Buzz. Sports Final and Red Sox This Week were retained (though Sports Final now aired on a half-hour tape delay from its WBZ-TV broadcast), and WLWC also added Phantom Gourmet from WSBK. Beginning with the 2005 season, WLWC (along with WSBK) began airing syndicated broadcasts of ACC college football and men's basketball games as Boston College's move to the conference created regional interest for the ACC.

Until May 2007, two of WBZ's weekday morning personalities were shown on WLWC's broadcast of The Daily Buzz as the station itself had none. During the program's weather reports, meteorologist Barry Burbank did a thirty-second local weather cut-in. During commercial breaks, traffic reporter Rich Kirkland would give a quick traffic update. After CBS sold the station to Four Points, Sports Final and Red Sox This Week were dropped and the WBZ morning personalities were removed from The Daily Buzz. The station also aired two local public affairs shows on Sunday mornings, The Jim Vincent Show and a rebroadcast of WSBE-TV's A Lively Experiment.

== Technical information ==
=== Subchannels ===
Subchannels of WPXQ-TV and WLWC
License	Channel	Res.	Short name	Programming
WPXQ-TV	69.1	720p	ION	Ion Television
WPXQ-TV	69.2	480i	Laff	Laff
WPXQ-TV	69.3	480i	BUSTED	Busted
WPXQ-TV	69.4	480i	CourtTV	Court TV
WPXQ-TV	69.5	480i	GameSho	Game Show Central
WPXQ-TV	69.6	480i	HSN	HSN
WPXQ-TV	69.8	480i	QVC	QVC
WLWC	28.1	480i	Bounce	Bounce TV

=== Analog-to-digital conversion ===
WLWC discontinued regular programming on its analog signal, over UHF channel 28, at midnight on December 9, 2008. The station's digital signal remained on its pre-transition UHF channel 22, using virtual channel 28.
