= Channel 1 (North American TV) =

American channel allocation in the electromagnetic spectrum

For standards developed in the United States, frequency allocations for television stations have commonly consisted of 6 MHz-wide spectrum groupings, known as "channels". The history of Channel 1 usage by North American over-the-air broadcasting stations, is divided into three main periods:

1. Prior to 1948 this was the first TV channel number, assigned to the lowest frequencies.
2. Due to interference concerns, Channel 1 was eliminated in 1948 from the NTSC analog assignments, meaning that TV set dials now started with channel 2. (Some cable television systems, which employed their own converters, included a channel 1, located at 72–78 MHz between channels 4 and 5, and moving channel 5 and 6 up by 2 MHz; however, this prevented channels 5 and 6 from being viewed on non-cable-ready television sets. Cable TV Channel 1 was also sometimes mapped to 99 (frequency range 114–120 MHz)).
3. With the switch from NTSC analog to ATSC digital TV standards, Channel 1 re-appeared to a limited extent as a "virtual channel" display, even though there was still no physical "RF" spectrum assignment for a "Channel 1"

== History ==
=== Analog TV ===
During the TV's experimental era, Channel 1 was relocated multiple times within the lower VHF spectrum. From 1937 to 1940, Channel 1 was allocated to 44–50 MHz, with visual and aural carrier frequencies fluctuating with changes in overall TV broadcast standards, prior to the establishment of permanent standards by the National Television Systems Committee (NTSC).

Effective July 1, 1941, the first commercial TV stations allocations were made by the Federal Communications Commission (FCC), based on NTSC recommendations, which consisted of 18 channels. The entire TV band was moved upward, due to the creation of the initial FM broadcast band, assigned to 42-50 MHz. TV channel 1 was moved to 50–56 MHz, affecting experimental stations in New York City, Chicago, and Los Angeles, with the visual carrier at 51.25 MHz and the aural carrier at 55.75 MHz.

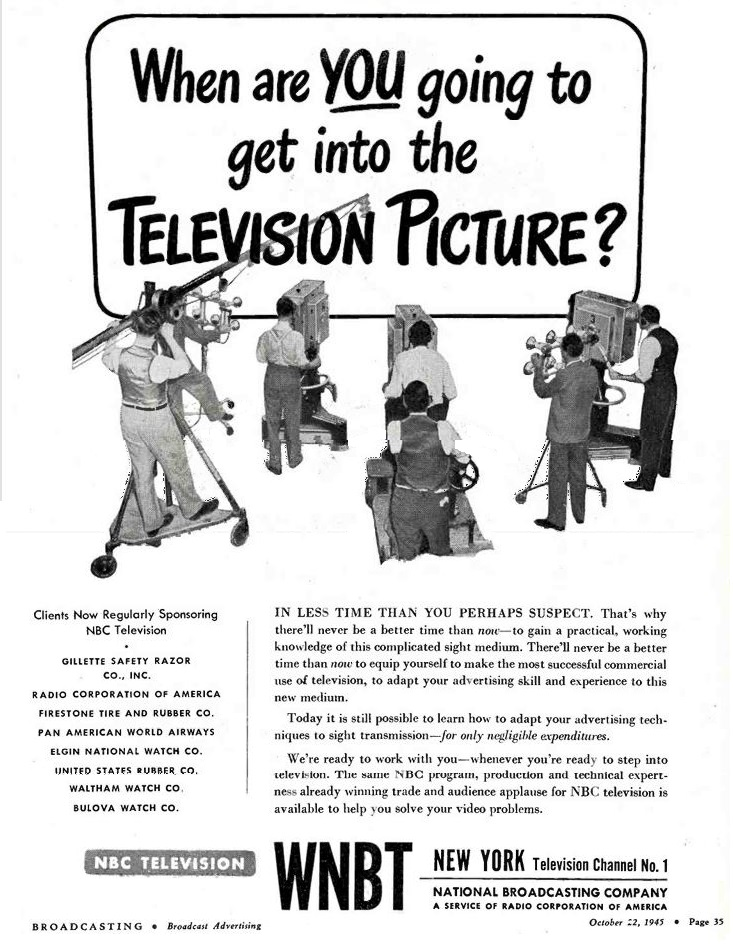
October 1945 advertisement for NBC's New York City station, WNBT, then on "Television Channel No. 1".

Between 1941 and 1946, several commercial and experimental stations operated on the 50–56 MHz Channel 1, including one station, WNBT (now WNBC, channel 4) in New York City, which had a full commercial license. Stations allocated to broadcast on channel 1 when it was located at 50–56 MHz included:

- W2XBS/WNBT/WRCA (today's WNBC), New York City (1941–1946), reassigned in 1946 to channel 4;
- W6XAO/KTSL/KNXT (today's KCBS-TV), Los Angeles, reassigned post-war to channel 2;
- W9XZV Chicago, Zenith's experimental station, billed as the first all-electric TV station in 1939. Reassigned post-war to Channel 2, it broadcast an early form of monochrome pay-TV in 1951 as K2XBS Phonevision and conducted early color television experiments before ultimately going dark in 1953. Its transmitters were donated to WTTW (PBS 11 Chicago) and its channel 2 assignment was taken by CBS O&O WBBM-TV.
- KARO, Riverside, California; never began broadcasting, no current VHF allocation;
- WSBE, South Bend, Indiana; never began broadcasting on channel 1, but was reallocated to UHF channel 34 in the 1952 revised channel allocation table, where it went on the air as WSBT-TV that year. As part of a consolidation of the Elkhart and South Bend communities into a single television market, WSBT-TV was moved in 1958 to UHF channel 22, where it remains as a digital CBS affiliate today; channel 34 became the home of PBS member station WNIT. No full-service VHF TV allocations were made available to South Bend due to its proximity to Chicago, making the city a UHF island.

By September 1945, additional stations temporarily granted construction permits to operate on channel 1 included:

- W8XCT (WLW) Cincinnati, Ohio ultimately built on channel 4 as commercial station WLWT, later moved to channel 5.
- W9RUI Iowa City, Iowa held an unbuilt construction permit, and additionally given a channel 12 assignment.
- W8XGZ Charleston, West Virginia, licensed to a chemical company, also held a channel one construction permit; there is no indication the stations ever got on the air.

World War II greatly slowed the introduction of television broadcasting, because of equipment shortages. In the spring of 1946, a re-allocation was implemented that reduced the number of TV channels from 18 to 13. The FM band was moved to its current assignment of 88-108 MHz, and TV Channel 1 was moved back to 44–50 MHz, with visual at 45.25 MHz and aural at 49.75 MHz. From 1945 to 1948, except for channel 6, TV stations in the U.S. shared their frequency assignments with fixed and mobile services.

Prior to the introduction of cable TV and public-access television channels, the FCC decided to reserve channel 1 for low-power Community television stations. This in turn meant that WNBT and all other existing Channel 1 stations were moved to other channels. While a handful of construction permits were issued for this final version of Channel 1, no station ever actually broadcast on it before it was removed from use in 1948.

The sharing of TV band assignments with Land Mobile Radio stations was found to cause severe interference, and there were also issues with reports of distant "skip" signals that mostly affected the lowest frequencies. Therefore, in 1948 the FCC implemented a freeze on new TV assignments, to give it time to review the situation. The FCC study conclusions, announced in 1952, resulted in a re-allocation of the TV assignments. TV Channel 1 was eliminated, and its former frequencies were now exclusively allocated for use by public safety and land mobile. The frequencies assigned to TV channels 2–13 were now exclusively reserved for broadcasters, except for selected VHF frequencies in Alaska and Hawaii and some overseas territories, which remains the current policy. (In addition, UHF channels 14 through 83 were added.)

Because Mexico's first TV station signed-on in 1950, and Canada's first station debuted in 1952, the elimination of Channel 1 (System M) did not affect these countries. However, although Japan generally adopted the NTSC analog standards, its frequency assignments were somewhat different from the United States, and included a Channel 1 that was located at 90 to 96 MHz, just above the Japanese FM band from 76 to 90 MHz. Public broadcaster NHK General TV broadcast on this Channel 1 in Tokyo and other cities. The frequencies used by Japan's channels 1 through 3 (90–108 MHz) are used primarily for FM radio broadcasting, with 88–108 MHz outside of Japan. which correspond to cable 95–97 in North America. With the advent of digital television, these frequencies are being vacated by TV broadcasters and allocated to "wide FM" broadcasters, relocating from AM (mediumwave) to an extended FM band located above 90 MHz.

=== ATSC digital TV's "virtual" Channel 1 ===
The ATSC digital TV transmission standard includes a feature, Program and System Information Protocol (PSIP), that allows over-the air television transmissions to specify that receivers should display a virtual channel number, which may be different from the physical "RF" channel that is being used. Examples of stations using this feature to display virtual channel 1 include:

- Japanese commercial television stations, which originally transmitted on that country's analog channel 1:
  - Hokkaido Broadcasting (HBC) in Sapporo, Hokkaido
  - Aomori Broadcasting Corporation (RAB) in Aomori, Aomori Prefecture
  - Tohoku Broadcasting Company (TBC) in Sendai, Miyagi Prefecture
  - Tokai Television Broadcasting (THK) in Nagoya, Aichi Prefecture
  - Kitanihon Broadcasting (KNB) in Toyama, Toyama Prefecture
  - Shikoku Broadcasting (JRT) in Tokushima, Tokushima Prefecture
  - Nihonkai Television (NKT) in Tottori, Tottori Prefecture (also serving Matsue, Shimane Prefecture)
  - Kyushu Asahi Broadcasting (KBC) in Fukuoka, Fukuoka Prefecture
  - Minaminihon Broadcasting (MBC) in Kagoshima, Kagoshima Prefecture
- KAXT-CD in San Francisco, because of overlap with another station transmitting with virtual channel 22, in July 2009 became the first U.S. station given permission to display virtual channel 1.
- In Mexico, XHDF-TDT and all Azteca Uno stations display virtual channel 1.

== See also ==
- List of experimental television stations for additional channel 1 pioneers.
- Very High Frequency
- Channel 37
