= Viet Show TV =

Viet Show Television's Logo

Viet Show Television (or Viet Show TV, or VSTV) is a Vietnamese-American television network established in 2008 and operating mainly in California. Viet Show TV's headquarters are located in San Jose, where it produces and broadcasts TV shows for Vietnamese-Americans in the US.

Viet Show TV broadcasts on different channels, both local and nationwide. The audience can enjoy free-to-air programs from VSTV by tuning to channel KTSF 26.6 in northern California and KJLA 57.5 in southern California. Audiences can also watch Viet Show's TV programs through Comcast Cable 238 and DirecTV 2079. North American audiences can watch this channel on the Galaxy 19 satellite.

Viet Show TV, Vietoday TV, and Viet Shopping TV are sister channels under Viet Show Television Corporation.

== VSTV network ==
U.S. and Canada

Galaxy 19 (satellite)

National Wide

DirecTV 2079

Northern California

KTSF 26.6

Comcast Cable 173

Crossing TV 238

San Bruno Cable 382

Southern California

KJLA 57.5
