= KO-AM TV =

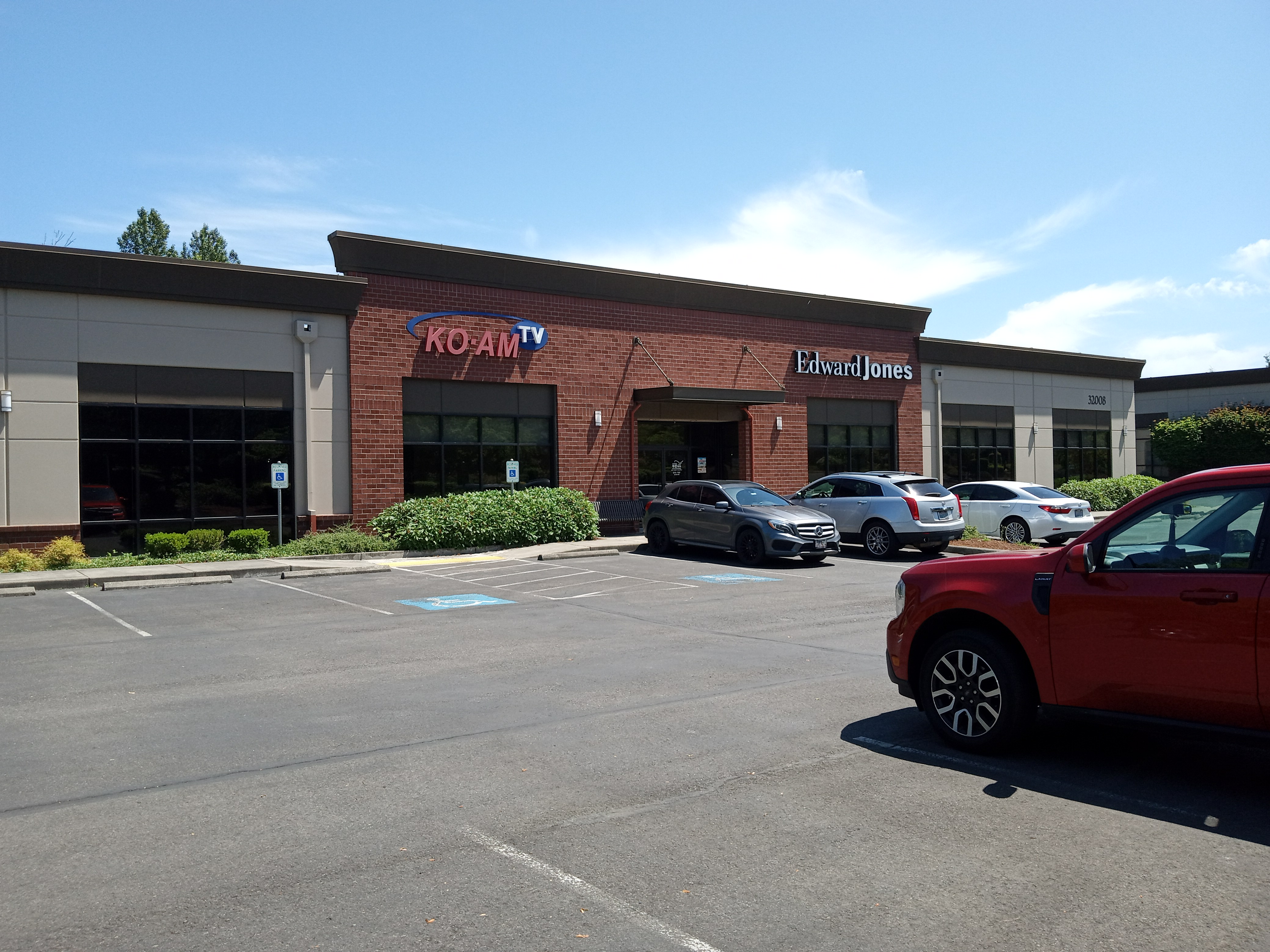
- Country: U.S.
- Headquarters: Seattle, Washington

Links
- Website: www.koamtvseattle.com

KO-AM TV (Korean-American Television) is a digital cable network based in Seattle, Washington, United States. The cable broadcasts programming for the local Korean American community in Western Washington, located at 32008 32nd Ave. S., Federal Way, WA 98001. As an affiliate of KBS World, it broadcasts Korean programming with English subtitles and broadcasts live coverage of Korean news as well as airing a locally produced newscast six days a week.

KO-AM TV is the only Korean American TV station that broadcasts in Washington State. KO-AM TV runs several programs such as popular videos, local news, weather news, traffic updates and Today's English (영어 한마디). For popular videos, they focus on recent popular news and viral animal videos; for local news, they go to significant events that are held around Seattle and interview people there. and broadcast news about Koreans who live in Washington State; for language learning program, they have Today's English, it is a short program that introduces one phrase in English and explains the phrase in Korean every day. Additionally, they broadcast various Korean programs that were originally broadcast in South Korea with English subtitles. For example, they broadcast Dong-Chi-Mi, a reality show, and Chun-Gi-Nu-Sul, a health program.

KO-AM TV’s Chairperson, Jong-Jae Ko, graduated from Yonsei University in South Korea. In 1983, he started working in the broadcasting field. He is also a chairman of Worldwide Korean Christian Broadcasters Association (WCBA).

== Awards ==
KO-AM TV was nominated by the Korean Broadcasting System in South Korea for a prize for their TV programming in 2004. They also got a prize for their TV programming from KBS Seoul Prize in 2010. [October 13, 2015].
