= Total Living Network =

American Christian television channel

- Type: Religious broadcasting
- Country: United States of America
- Availability: National, broadcast worldwide
- Official website: http://tlnmedia.com

Total Living Network (TLN) is a religious broadcasting channel based in Aurora, Illinois.

TLN operates two feeds, one for the Chicago metropolitan area and carried mainly on Comcast/Xfinity digital cable systems in that area with a schedule customized for the Central Time Zone, and the other ("TLN West") for the Western United States with a limited number of terrestrial over-the-air affiliates and customized for the Pacific Time Zone. Both feeds carry the same programs, with slight differences in scheduling times.

TLN is a continuation of the former Christian Communications of Chicagoland, which owned WCFC-TV (channel 38) from 1976 until 1998, when the organization sold that station to Paxson Communications to become today's WCPX-TV, now carrying Ion Television, along with KTLN-TV (channel 68) from 1998 until 2019 in the San Francisco Bay Area, and WCFC-CD (channel 51) from 1986 until 2008, which extended WCFC-TV's signal into the Rockford area. TLN Media is currently broadcast on KQSL.

In both feeds, TLN carries lifestyle-oriented Christian televangelism, infomercials, and a limited number of secular lifestyle programs.

Programs include:

- Marriage: For Better For Worse, a show dedicated to helping people restore and refresh their marriages using biblical principles
- Significant Insights, featuring one-on-one conversations with notable guests
- Aspiring Women, a women's talk show produced by TLN
- The DUI Expert, a no-frills, expert discussion on drugs, alcohol and driving hosted by William Pelarenos

TLN is also involved in the production of original specials, such as The Da Vinci Code Deception. Much of TLN's programming consists of televangelism from outside providers that are distributed on numerous other televangelism networks, including Enjoying Everyday Life with Joyce Meyer, In Touch Ministries with Charles Stanley, Sid Roth's It's Supernatural!, The 700 Club, Joseph Prince, and numerous others.

The network airs a limited amount of syndicated secular programming, including Small Town Big Deal, Real Life 101 (to meet E/I mandates), P. Allen Smith Gardens, Lindner's Fishing Edge and Business First AM. The remainder of the program time is paid programming.
