= WOCH-CD =

Television station in Chicago (1989–2017)

- Chicago, Illinois; United States
- Channels: Digital: 49 (UHF); Virtual: 41

Programming
- Affiliations: 41.1: Charge!; 41.2: Comet

Ownership
- Owner: NRJ TV, LLC; (NRJ TV Chicago License Co., LLC)

History
- First air date: September 27, 1989
- Last air date: August 14, 2017; (27 years, 321 days)
- Former call signs: W04CK (1989–2000); WOCH-LP (2000–2005); WOCH-CA (2005–2014)
- Former channel number: Analog: 4 (VHF, 1991–1997), 28 (UHF, 1997–2005), 41 (UHF, 2005–2014)
- Former affiliations: The Box (1989–2001); MTV2 (2001–2004); KBS (until 2014); Arirang (2009–2014); The Works (2014–2017)
- Call sign meaning: Illinois, Chicago (disambiguation)

Technical information
- Licensing authority: FCC
- Facility ID: 35101
- Class: CD
- ERP: 15 kW
- HAAT: 356 m (1,168 ft)
- Transmitter coordinates: 41°53′56.00″N 87°37′23.00″W

Links
- Public license information: Public file; LMS

WOCH-CD (channel 41) was a low-power, Class A television station in Chicago, Illinois, United States. The station was owned by NRJ TV, LLC.

== History ==
Former station logo

WOCH started broadcasting on September 27, 1989, as W04CK and later broadcast on several channels. In 2005, it moved to its final channel location on channel 41 to avoid interference with the digital signal of Milwaukee NBC affiliate WTMJ-TV (channel 4). WOCH upgraded to Class A status on December 29, 2005, thus protecting their channel position from further displacements. During its days on channel 28 (which was its location prior to moving to channel 41), it ran The Box Music Network from midnight to noon with Korean American Broadcasting Company (or KBC) programming from noon to midnight. In 2001, when Viacom took over The Box and switched it to MTV2, WOCH began running an MTV2 feed from DirecTV during the midnight to noon timeslot, but gradually phased it out by 2003–2004.

On September 15, 2010, KBC-TV started its carriage on Comcast channel 338 in the Chicago television market. This move came after years of effort by KBC to secure carriage on the Comcast system. In addition to programming from South Korea, and some locally produced programs, WOCH aired non-Korean ethnic programming on weekends (such as programming from local cable television network Bostel), in a format similar to that of FBT 26.6.

In September 2012, KM Communications filed to sell WOCH to NRJ TV (a company unrelated to European broadcaster NRJ Radio). The sale was completed on July 30, 2013.

In April 2014, the station became an affiliate of the classic movie network The Works.

On October 31, 2015, the WOCH 41.2 subchannel began airing the Comet TV network.

On April 13, 2017, the Federal Communications Commission (FCC) announced that WOCH-CD was a successful bidder in the spectrum auction; NRJ TV would be surrendering the station's license in exchange for $9,219,110. NRJ TV surrendered WOCH-CD's license to the FCC for cancellation on August 14, 2017.

== Technical information ==
=== Subchannels ===
The station's signal was multiplexed:

Subchannels of WOCH-CD
Channel	Res.	Short name	Programming
41.1	480i	WOCH-1	Charge! (4:3)
41.2	480i	WOCH-2	Comet

=== Analog-to-digital conversion ===
As a low-power analog television station, WOCH-CA was not required to broadcast a digital signal as of the 2009 digital television transition. The station had reported, however, that viewers installing coupon-eligible converter boxes were, in some cases, unable to tune into low-power analog stations such as WOCH-CA after conversion as many models of the digital converters lack analog passthrough.

On April 27, 2010, the FCC granted WOCH-CA a construction permit to flash cut from analog channel 41 to digital channel 49. As of July 2013, WOCH-CD began broadcasting exclusively in digital.
