= TheCoolTV =

Defunct digital broadcast network

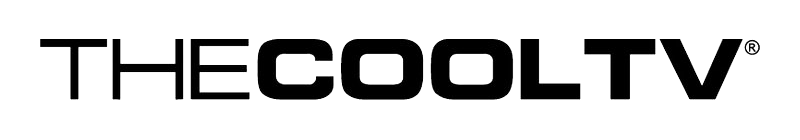
- Country: United States
- Headquarters: Lawrence, Kansas

Programming
- Language: English

Ownership
- Owner: Cool Music Network, LLC

History
- Launched: March 2009; 17 years ago (as a digital broadcast television network); August 1, 2017; 8 years ago (as an online only streaming service)
- Closed: August 2017; 8 years ago (as a digital broadcast television network); April 2018; 8 years ago (as streaming service)

TheCoolTV was a digital broadcast television network and online music video "jukebox" streaming service owned by Cool Music Network, LLC of Lawrence, Kansas.

== History ==
=== As a digital broadcast television network ===
Launched in March 2009, the network's program schedule consisted of an all-music video lineup; it also broadcast the minimum three hours of children's programming for their affiliates intended to meet E/I requirements set by the Federal Communications Commission.

In addition to the network, Cool Music Network also distributed recorded music and performances through digital cable and satellite channels, and post-concert CDs at music venues.

TheCoolTV's output consisted of subchannels of digital broadcast television stations, the first of which was now-former affiliate WTMJ-TV, which added TheCoolTV to subchannel 4.3 on July 8, 2009. A large portion of its stations were owned and/or operated by Journal Communications, Sinclair Broadcast Group, and LIN TV. The affiliate roster grew with help from an affiliation deal with three stations operated by McGraw-Hill. On April 6, 2011, The CoolTV signed an affiliate agreement with Newport Television for carriage on 10 of its 22 markets.

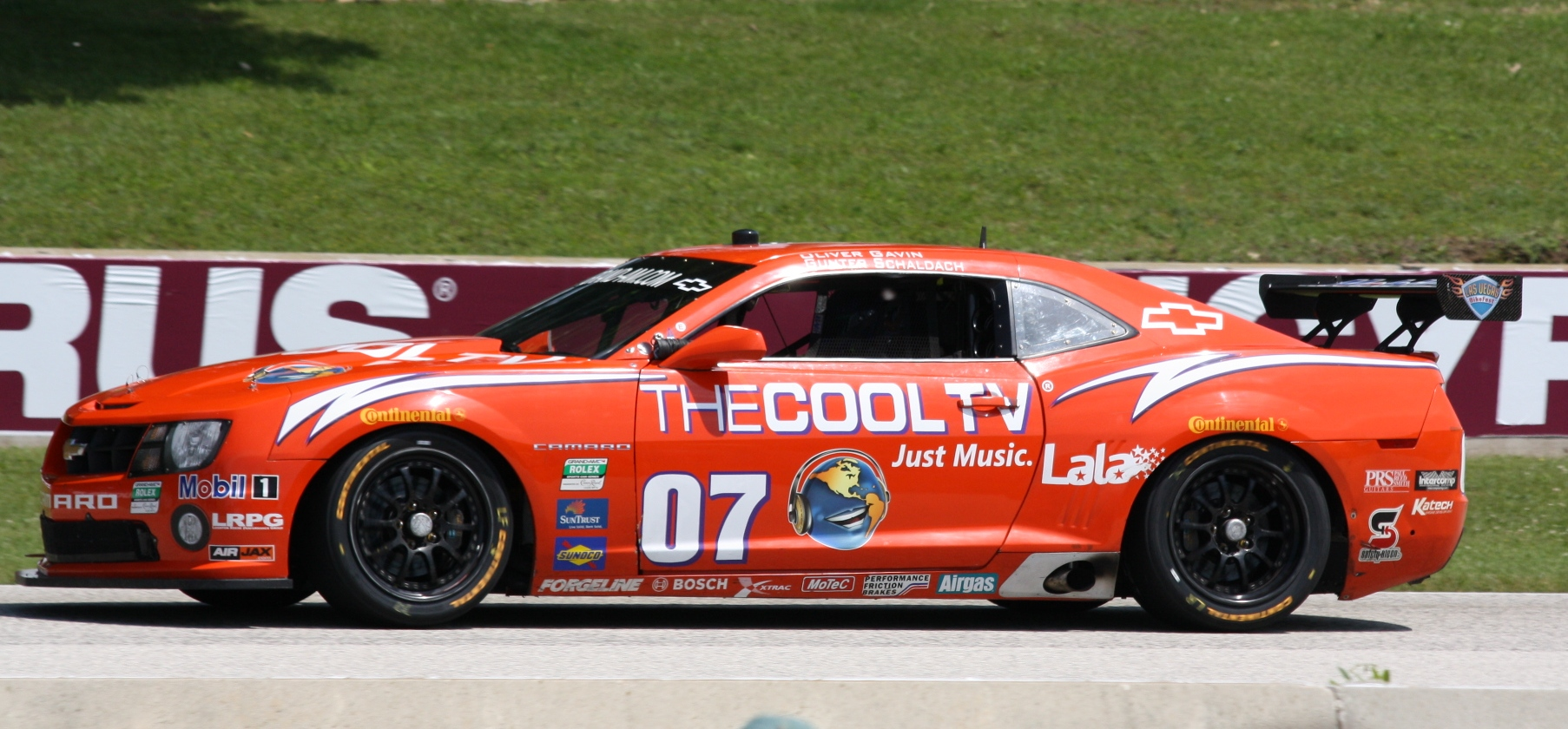
Sports car sponsored by TheCoolTV

Stations that were affiliated with TheCoolTV had the nominal ability to cross-promote the network in association with a sister or affiliated radio station. However, the only affiliate that actually utilized this component was WTMJ-TV, which marketed TheCoolTV as a complement to its sister radio station adult hits-formatted WLWK-FM (promoted as "TheCoolTV, hosted by 94-5 Lake FM"), with the other stations usually being part of ownership groups without any radio stations.

In September 2011, Journal announced that it would file a lawsuit against Cool Music Network for non-payment of broadcast services. Journal replaced The CoolTV with the Live Well Network in Milwaukee, and MeTV in Green Bay and Lansing on October 1, 2011.

On the afternoon of August 31, 2012, TheCoolTV was dropped from all 32 Sinclair Broadcast Group stations that carried the channel, with no replacement. No reason was given, other than a very brief message from Jim Wright, the Regional Engineering Manager for Sinclair, who said: "We are no longer carrying CoolTV on all Sinclair stations as of this afternoon."

The agreement with Newport Television to carry TheCoolTV was terminated upon Newport being purchased by Nexstar Broadcasting Group, which at the time carried few subchannels on its stations, and all former Newport stations had discontinued carrying TheCoolTV by April 2013. All agreements with McGraw-Hill were also terminated upon the E. W. Scripps Company's purchase of the McGraw-Hill stations in early 2012.

On March 1, 2013, two LIN stations in Albuquerque and Austin dropped the network. The remainder of LIN Media's stations dropped the network on July 15, 2013, with some replacing it with Bounce TV or local radar loops, or leaving them dark altogether.

Sometime in November 2012, TheCoolTV began airing free-to-air on the Galaxy 19 (97 West) satellite in the K_{u} band. However, this feed was discontinued without explanation. The network's webstream was hosted by JBTV until September 2016, when that company terminated the agreement due to non-payment.

Since the fall of 2011, the network's carriage fell precipitously from a peak of around 80 affiliates until 2017, when it was down to solely two stations, meeting the minimum definition of a television network. The final station carrying it, KCTU-LD7/Wichita, dropped it for The Walk TV on July 31, 2017.

=== As an online-only streaming service ===
TheCoolTV converted to an online-only service on August 1, 2017. In this final form, no new streaming content was uploaded to the site, and most of the site's content was made up of either YouTube embeds into the site or only videos for smaller artists; this lasted until the last week of April 2018, when the domain expired and the site disappeared. It returned in the next month, but with several broken links and out-of-date promotional materials for the network and filler text on several pages (including false placeholder addresses), suggesting a restoration from an older and inaccurate backup of the site.
