= WTBL-CD =

- Lenoir, North Carolina; United States
- Channels: Digital: 49 (UHF); Virtual: 49
- Branding: WTBL Community Television

Programming
- Affiliations: FamilyNet (1988–June 30, 2017); Independent (2017)

Ownership
- Owner: OTA Broadcasting; (OTA Broadcasting (CLT), LLC)
- Sister stations: W21CK-D

History
- First air date: 1989
- Last air date: October 25, 2017
- Former call signs: W53AO (1988–1995); WTBL-LP (1995–2012)
- Former channel numbers: Analog: 53 (UHF, 1989–2001), 49 (UHF, 2001–2012)

Technical information
- Facility ID: 54983
- Class: CD
- ERP: 7 kW
- HAAT: 329 m (1,079 ft)
- Transmitter coordinates: 35°54′25″N 81°29′22.98″W

WTBL-CD (channel 49) was a Class A television station in Lenoir, North Carolina, United States. It was primarily programmed as an independent station with some shows from FamilyNet. WTBL-CD was last owned by OTA Broadcasting, a company controlled by Michael Dell's MSD Capital. On cable, the station was carried on channel 13 in the Lenoir area. WLNN-CD in Boone provided its newscasts and other local programming for the station, and broadcast full-time on WTBL-CD's second digital subchannel.

== History ==
WTBL-CD started as W53AO, on channel 53. The station was mentioned in the April 1994 edition of Popular Communications magazine, in which it made mention of the station's attempt to be carried on the local cable television system.

On April 13, 2017, the FCC identified WTBL-CD would be compensated $8.2 million to go off-the-air as part of the spectrum auction. WTBL-CD ceased operations October 25, 2017; its license was surrendered on October 30.

== Subchannels ==
The station's signal was multiplexed:

Subchannels of WTBL-CD
Channel	Res.	Short name	Programming
49.1	480i	TBLTV	Main WTBL-CD programming (4:3)
49.2	480i	TBLTV	Simulcast of WLNN-CD (4:3)
