= List of television stations in Oregon =

This is a list of broadcast television stations that are licensed in the U.S. state of Oregon.

== Full-power ==
- Stations are arranged by media market served and channel position.

Full-power television stations in Oregon
Media market	Station	Channel	Primary affiliation(s)	Notes	Refs
Bend	KOAB-TV	3	PBS	(Note: Satellite of KOPB-TV.)	
Bend	KOHD	18	ABC, CBS on 18.2		
Bend	KTVZ	21	NBC, The CW on 21.2, Fox on 21.3		
Coos Bay	KCBY-TV	11	CBS	(Note: Satellite of KVAL-TV.)	
Coos Bay	KMCB	23	NBC, The CW on 23.2	(Note: Satellite of KMTR.)	
Eugene	KOAC-TV	7	PBS	(Note: Licensed to Corvallis, Oregon.)	
Eugene	KEZI	9	ABC		
Eugene	KVAL-TV	13	CBS		
Eugene	KMTR	16	NBC, The CW on 16.2		
Eugene	KEPB-TV	28	PBS		
Eugene	KLSR-TV	34	Fox, MyNetworkTV on 34.2		
Klamath Falls	KOTI	2	NBC	(Note: Satellite of KOBI.)	
Klamath Falls	KFTS	22	PBS	(Note: Satellite of KSYS.)	
Klamath Falls	KDKF	31	ABC	(Note: Satellite of KDRV.)	
La Grande	KTVR	13	PBS		
La Grande	KUNP	16	Independent		
Medford	KOBI	5	NBC		
Medford	KSYS	8	PBS		
Medford	KTVL	10	CBS, The CW on 10.2		
Medford	KDRV	12	ABC		
Medford	KMVU-DT	26	Fox		
Medford	KBLN-TV	30	3ABN	(Note: Licensed to Grants Pass, Oregon.)	
Portland	KATU	2	ABC, Independent on 2.2		
Portland	KOIN	6	CBS		
Portland	KGW	8	NBC		
Portland	KOPB-TV	10	PBS		
Portland	KPTV	12	Fox		
Portland	KPXG-TV	22	Ion Television	(Note: Licensed to Salem, Oregon.)	
Portland	KNMT	24	TBN		
Portland	KRCW-TV	32	The CW		
Portland	KPDX	49	MyNetworkTV	(Note: Licensed to Vancouver, Washington.)	
Roseburg	KPIC	4	CBS		
Roseburg	KTVC	36	3ABN		
Roseburg	KTCW	46	NBC, The CW on 46.2		
~Kennewick, Washington	KFFX-TV	11	Fox, Telemundo on 11.2	(Note: Licensed to Pendleton, Oregon.)	

== Low-power ==
Low-power television stations in Oregon
Media market	Station	Channel	Primary affiliation(s)	Notes	Refs
Astoria	KPWT-LD	3	Heroes & Icons		
Astoria	K28FP-D	28	Silent		
Astoria	KHPN-LD	51	[Blank]		
Bend	KBNZ-LD	7	CBS		
Bend	KBND-LD	14	theDove		
Bend	K16KI-D	16	Silent		
Bend	K17DU-D	17	3ABN	(Note: Licensed to Christmas Valley, Oregon.)	
Bend	KABH-CD	17	Silent		
Bend	KQRE-LD	20	Telemundo, Fox on 20.2		
Bend	K23CU-D	23	3ABN	(Note: Licensed to Prineville, Oregon.)	
Bend	K25GA-D	25	Silent	(Note: Licensed to Redmond and Prineville, Oregon.)	
Bend	K36OG-D	28	IBN Television		
Bend	K28MH-D	28	[Blank]		
Bend	KBDH-LD	29	Silent		
Bend	K31NO-D	31	Dabl, NBC on 31.2, The CW on 31.3		
Bend	KFXO-CD	39	Fox, Telemundo on 39.2		
Cottage Grove	K14LP-D	14	Create		
Cottage Grove	K34LR-D	38	Various		
Cottage Grove	K30OC-D	44	Various		
Cottage Grove	K22HO-D	47	Various		
Eugene	K03IM-D	3	Weather radar		
Eugene	KORY-CD	15	Various		
Eugene	K16JS-D	17	Silent		
Eugene	KEVU-CD	23	MyNetworkTV		
Eugene	KCKW-LD	25	Telemundo		
Eugene	K34LR-D	38	Various		
Eugene	K06QR-D	41	Various		
Florence	K34NI-D	48	3ABN		
Klamath Falls	K23PA-D	23	[Blank]		
Lakeview	K31KZ-D	5	3ABN		
Medford	KDOV-LD	18	Religious independent		
Medford	K14RW-D	20	[Blank]		
Medford	K20KV-D	20	[Blank]		
Medford	K22JS-D	22	[Blank]	(Note: Licensed to Ashland, Oregon.)	
Medford	K28GG-D	28	Silent		
Medford	K14SC-D	39	Silent		
Medford	K40KR-D	40	[Blank]		
Medford	KFBI-LD	48	MyNetworkTV, Telemundo on 48.2		
Milton-Freewater	K20MJ-D	40	Various		
Portland	KSLM-LD	3; 17; 27; 31	QVC; YTA TV theDove; Estrella TV	(Note: Licensed to Dallas, Oregon.)	
Portland	KORS-CD	16	Silent		
Portland	KOXI-CD	20	Various		
Portland	KJYY-LD	29	Telemundo, TeleXitos on 29.2		
Portland	KOXO-CD	41	Silent		
Portland	KPXG-LD	42	Daystar		
Roseburg	K36JZ-D	18	Silent		
Roseburg	K28KI-D	25	Silent		
Roseburg	K34IC-D	34	3ABN	(Note: Licensed to Glide, Oregon.)	
Roseburg	K35OH-D	43	Silent		
The Dalles	KRHP-CD	14	[Blank]		
The Dalles	K17OY-D	17	[Blank]	(Note: Licensed to Centerville, Oregon.)	
Tillamook	K21LB-D	21	Silent	(Note: Licensed to Lincoln City, Oregon.)	
Tri-City	K21KE-D	32	3ABN	(Note: Licensed to Canyonville, Oregon.)	

== Translators ==
Television station translators in Oregon
Media market	Station	Channel	Translating	Notes	Refs
Astoria	K26DB-D	2	KATU		
Astoria	K15IQ-D	3	KPWT-LD		
Astoria	K34DC-D	6	KOIN		
Astoria	K17HA-D	8	KGW		
Astoria	K23GK-D	10	KOPB-TV		
Astoria	K21DE-D	12; 49	KPTV; KPDX	(Note: Licensed to Seaside and Astoria, Oregon.)	
Bend	K26NX-D	2	KATU	(Note: Licensed to Madras, Oregon.)	
Bend	K35LD-D	2	KATU		
Bend	K16EM-D	3	KOAB-TV		
Bend	KOAB-TV (DRT)	3	KOAB-TV		
Bend	KOAB-TV (DRT)	3	KOAB-TV	(Note: Licensed to Sentinel Hill, Oregon.)	
Bend	K24KG-D	6	KOIN		
Bend	K34AI-D	7	KBNZ-LD	(Note: Licensed to La Pine, Oregon.)	
Bend	K04BJ-D	7	KBNZ-LD		
Bend	K19LT-D	8	KGW		
Bend	K34JR-D	8	KGW		
Bend	K36BA-D	10	KOPB-TV	(Note: Licensed to Burns, Oregon.)	
Bend	K26FQ-D	10	KOPB-TV	(Note: Licensed to John Day, Oregon.)	
Bend	K08LG-D	10	KOPB-TV	(Note: Licensed to Silver Lake, Oregon.)	
Bend	K34LS-D	10	KOPB-TV	(Note: Licensed to Seneca, Oregon.)	
Bend	K26KQ-D	10	KOPB-TV		
Bend	K28OV-D	12; 49	KPTV; KPDX		
Bend	KUBN-LD	12; 49	KPTV; KPDX		
Bend	K09YE-D	18	KOHD		
Bend	WPNB680	18	KOHD	(Note: Licensed to Spring River Butte, Oregon.)	
Bend	K22IL-D	22	K31NO-D		
Bend	K23PN-D	23	KFXO-CD		
Bend	K24JE-D	24	KTVZ	(Note: Licensed to Sunriver, Oregon.)	
Bend	K27DO-D	27	KTVZ		
Bend	K28QR-D	28	KTVZ		
Bend	K30JT-D	30	KTVZ		
Bend	K32KP-D	32	KTVZ; KFXO-CD; KBNZ-LD; KOHD; KOAB-TV	(Note: Licensed to Black Butte Ranch, Oregon.)	
Bend	K36OD-D	38	KTVZ	(Note: Licensed to North La Pine, Oregon.)	
Bend	K32CC-D	39	KFXO-CD	(Note: Licensed to Montgomery Ranch, Oregon.)	
Bend	K13AAQ-D	49	KPTV		
Cave Junction	K07PZ-D	5	KOBI		
Cave Junction	K22IQ-D	8	KSYS		
Cave Junction	K21JI-D	10	KTVL		
Cave Junction	K29NI-D	12	KDRV		
Cave Junction	K16NK-D	30	KBLN-TV		
Coos Bay	K36BX-D	5	KOBI		
Coos Bay	K16IE-D	7	KOAC-TV		
Coos Bay	K04OS-D	9	KEZI	(Note: Licensed to Reedsport, Oregon.)	
Coos Bay	K27CL-D	9	KEZI		
Coos Bay	K14MQ-D	14	KEVU-CD		
Coos Bay	K15KF-D	23	KMCB		
Coos Bay	K20LL-D	28	KEPB-TV		
Coos Bay	K23KD-D	28	KEPB-TV		
Coos Bay	K33LZ-D	28	KEPB-TV	(Note: Licensed to Myrtle Point, Oregon.)	
Coos Bay	K30BN-D	34	KLSR-TV		
Cottage Grove	K16LL-D	5	KOBI		
Cottage Grove	K24LY-D	9	KEZI		
Cottage Grove	K26MZ-D	13	KVAL-TV		
Cottage Grove	K36NL-D	16	KMTR		
Cottage Grove	K20IR-D	28	KEPB-TV		
Cottage Grove	K32LW-D	34	KLSR-TV		
Eugene	K08PZ-D	2	KATU		
Eugene	KVDO-LD	3; 17; 27; 31	KSLM-LD	(Note: Licensed to Albany, Oregon.)	
Eugene	K16ML-D	8	KGW		
Eugene	K11GT-D	9	KEZI		
Eugene	K20DD-D	12; 49	KPTV; KPDX		
Eugene	K11SZ-D	28	KEPB-TV	(Note: Licensed to Oakridge, Oregon.)	
Eugene	K21FS-D	28	KEPB-TV		
Eugene	K14GW-D	34	KLSR-TV		
Eugene	K19GH-D	34	KLSR-TV		
Eugene	KAMK-LD	36	KTVC		
Florence	K15JG-D	9	KEZI	(Note: Licensed to Scottsburg, Oregon.)	
Florence	K25NI-D	9	KEZI	(Note: Licensed to Mapleton, Oregon.)	
Florence	K35HW-D	9	KEZI		
Florence	K21LY-D	13	KVAL-TV		
Florence	K21MB-D	13	KVAL-TV		
Florence	K24MF-D	13	KVAL-TV		
Florence	K26NE-D	16	KMTR		
Florence	K32HF-D	28	KEPB-TV		
Florence	K19EC-D	28	KEPB-TV		
Florence	K28NZ-D	34	KLSR-TV		
Gold Beach	K08AK-D	5	KOBI	(Note: Licensed to Port Orford, Oregon.)	
Gold Beach	K13MI-D	5	KOBI	(Note: Licensed to Cedar Valley, Oregon.)	
Gold Beach	K25EN-D	5	KOBI		
Gold Beach	K04MG-D	10	KOPB-TV	(Note: Licensed to Wedderburn, Oregon.)	
Gold Beach	K29JN-D	10	KOPB-TV		
Gold Beach	K15KB-D	11	KCBY-TV	(Note: Licensed to Squaw Valley, Oregon.)	
Gold Beach	K33CP-D	11	KCBY-TV		
Gold Beach	K35MT-D	11	KCBY-TV		
Gold Beach	K16LI-D	28	KEPB-TV		
Klamath Falls	K06NS-D	2	KOTI	(Note: Licensed to Chiloquin, Oregon.)	
Klamath Falls	K36IB-D	2	KOTI	(Note: Licensed to Midland, Oregon.)	
Klamath Falls	K15KE-D	10	KTVL		
Klamath Falls	K19HH-D	10	KTVL		
Klamath Falls	K31NH-D	30	KBLN-TV		
Klamath Falls	K26NB-D	48	KFBI-LD		
La Grande	K27MX-D	2	KATU	(Note: Licensed to Baker Valley, Oregon.)	
La Grande	K32LY-D	2	KATU		
La Grande	K35GA-D	2	KATU		
La Grande	K24MC-D	6	KOIN		
La Grande	K29EL-D	6	KOIN		
La Grande	K30OG-D	6	KOIN		
La Grande	K18KI-D	7	KTVB	(Note: Licensed to Baker City, Oregon.)	
La Grande	K23DB-D	7	KTVB		
La Grande	K30OF-D	7	KTVB		
La Grande	K26FV-D	8	KGW		
La Grande	K28NY-D	8	KGW		
La Grande	K36NP-D	8	KGW		
La Grande	K21MS-D	12; 49	KPTV; KPDX		
La Grande	K22LY-D	12; 49	KPTV; KPDX		
La Grande	K25OJ-D	12; 49	KPTV; KPDX		
La Grande	K33FS-D	12; 49	KPTV; KPDX		
La Grande	K08KW-D	13	KTVR	(Note: Licensed to Richland, Oregon.)	
La Grande	K10NF-D	13	KTVR	(Note: Licensed to Halfway, Oregon.)	
La Grande	K20IV-D	13	KTVR		
La Grande	K28JC-D	13	KTVR	(Note: Licensed to Enterprise, Oregon.)	
La Grande	K34NG-D	13	KTVR		
La Grande	K31GN-D	32	KRCW-TV		
Lakeview	K07NR-D	2	KOTI		
Lakeview	K15HU-D	10	KTVL		
Lakeview	K09VC-D	10	KOPB-TV	(Note: Licensed to Paisley, Oregon.)	
Lakeview	K19BK-D	10	KOPB-TV		
Lakeview	K28LO-D	10	KOPB-TV		
London Springs	K31PI-D	9	KEZI		
London Springs	K11KI-D	11	KEZI; KVAL-TV; KMTR; KLSR-TV; KEPB-TV; KEZI	(Note: Licensed to Dorena, Oregon.)	
London Springs	K27JY-D	13	KVAL-TV		
London Springs	K35JH-D	16	KMTR		
London Springs	K33KD-D	28	KEPB-TV		
London Springs	K23OS-D	34	KLSR-TV		
Medford	K07HS-D	5	KOBI	(Note: Licensed to Williams, Oregon.)	
Medford	K31OQ-D	5	KOBI		
Medford	K32DY-D	5	KOBI		
Medford	K33PM-D	5	KOBI	(Note: Licensed to Gold Hill, Oregon.)	
Medford	K02JG-D	8	KSYS	(Note: Licensed to Prospect, Oregon.)	
Medford	K02JJ-D	8	KSYS		
Medford	K13PE-D	8	KSYS	(Note: Licensed to Shady Cove, Oregon.)	
Medford	K13PF-D	8	KSYS	(Note: Licensed to Pinehurst, Oregon.)	
Medford	K13PI-D	8	KSYS	(Note: Licensed to Ruch and Applegate, Oregon.)	
Medford	K19HS-D	8	KSYS		
Medford	K27KW-D	8	KSYS		
Medford	K34DJ-D	8	KSYS	(Note: Licensed to Phoenix, Oregon.)	
Medford	K34JD-D	8	KSYS		
Medford	K04JZ-D	10	KTVL		
Medford	K14TH-D	10	KTVL		
Medford	K15JZ-D	10	KTVL	(Note: Licensed to Applegate Valley, Oregon.)	
Medford	K07GI-D	10	KTVL		
Medford	K03BZ	10	KTVL	(Note: Licensed to Rogue River, Oregon.)	
Medford	K15KL-D	10	KTVL	(Note: Licensed to Jacksonville, Oregon.)	
Medford	K14QH-D	10	KTVL	(Note: Licensed to Butte Falls, Oregon.)	
Medford	K29LL-D	10	KTVL		
Medford	K18LU-D	10	KTVL	(Note: Licensed to Glendale, Oregon.)	
Medford	K25JW-D	10	KTVL	(Note: Licensed to Hugo, Oregon.)	
Medford	K15KJ-D	12	KDRV		
Medford	K15BP-D	12	KDRV		
Medford	K21BG-D	12	KDRV		
Medford	KDSO-LD	16	KDOV-LD		
Medford	K34NO-D	26	KMVU-DT		
Medford	K23EX-D	30	KBLN-TV		
Medford	K25IM-D	30	KBLN-TV		
Medford	K36NF-D	30	KBLN-TV		
Medford	K17EZ-D	30	KBLN-TV		
Medford	K33GJ-D	30	KBLN-TV	(Note: Licensed to Merlin, Oregon.)	
Milton-Freewater	K28FT-D	2	KATU		
Milton-Freewater	K24ME-D	6	KOIN		
Milton-Freewater	K29EG-D	7	KSPS-TV		
Milton-Freewater	K34NS-D	12	KPTV		
Milton-Freewater	K35FO-D	12	KPTV		
Milton-Freewater	K30OA-D	13	KTVR		
Milton-Freewater	K23FH-D	23	KFFX-TV		
Portland	KWVT-LD	3; 17; 27; 31	KSLM-LD		
Portland	KGWZ-LD	8	KGW		
Portland	KORK-CD	35	KOXI-CD		
Portland	KKEI-CD	38	KOXI-CD		
Portland	KUNP-LD	47	KUNP		
Portland	K18EL-D	12; 49	KPTV; KPDX	(Note: Licensed to Newberg, Oregon.)	
Portland	KJWY-LD	21	KJYY-LD		
Portland	K19MI-D	12	K18EL-D		
Powers	K26NJ-D	7	KOAC-TV		
Powers	K34KL-D	9	KEZI		
Powers	K24MH-D	11	KCBY-TV		
Powers	K28OD-D	23	KMCB		
Powers	K32JL-D	34	KLSR-TV		
Roseburg	K26HO-D	4	KPIC		
Roseburg	K29KR-D	4	KPIC	(Note: Licensed to Camas Valley, Oregon.)	
Roseburg	K20MK-D	5	KOBI		
Roseburg	K25OK-D	5	KOBI	(Note: Licensed to Yoncalla, Oregon.)	
Roseburg	K11VI-D	7	KOAC-TV	(Note: Licensed to Elkton, Oregon.)	
Roseburg	K11BX-D	9	KEZI	(Note: Licensed to Sutherlin, Oregon.)	
Roseburg	K22MB-D	9	KEZI		
Roseburg	K23ME-D	9	KEZI		
Roseburg	K31AE-D	16	KMTR		
Roseburg	K15KN-D	28	KEPB-TV		
Roseburg	K24FH-D	28	KEPB-TV		
Roseburg	K32FI-D	34	KLSR-TV		
Roseburg	K33NY-D	34	KLSR-TV		
The Dalles	K18HH-D	2	KATU		
The Dalles	K28CQ-D	2	KATU	(Note: Licensed to Hood River, Oregon.)	
The Dalles	K07YV-D	6	KOIN		
The Dalles	K23OV-D	6	KOIN		
The Dalles	K25KS-D	8	KGW		
The Dalles	K34KE-D	8	KGW		
The Dalles	K31HZ-D	10	KOPB-TV		
The Dalles	K36FG-D	10	KOPB-TV		
The Dalles	K20EH-D	12; 49	KPTV; KPDX		
The Dalles	K22KC-D	12; 49	KPTV; KPDX		
The Dalles	K26NQ-D	12; 49	KPTV; KPDX		
The Dalles	K27PI-D	12; 49	KPTV; KPDX	(Note: Licensed to Portland, Oregon.)	
The Dalles	K29NO-D	12; 49	KPTV; KPDX		
Tillamook	K23NS-D	2	KATU	(Note: Licensed to Rockaway Beach, Oregon.)	
Tillamook	K32NK-D	2	KATU		
Tillamook	K34PJ-D	2	KATU		
Tillamook	KPWC-LD	3; 17; 27; 31	KSLM-LD		
Tillamook	K15KV-D	6	KOIN		
Tillamook	K23OC-D	6	KOIN	(Note: Licensed to Lincoln City and Newport, Oregon.)	
Tillamook	K18FR-D	7	KOAC-TV	(Note: Licensed to Newport, Oregon.)	
Tillamook	K19EI-D	7	KOAC-TV	(Note: Licensed to Pacific City, Oregon.)	
Tillamook	K17NJ-D	8	KGW		
Tillamook	K28MJ-D	8	KGW		
Tillamook	K29AZ-D	8	KGW		
Tillamook	K36GU-D	10	KOPB-TV		
Tillamook	K15DS-D	12; 49	KPTV; KPDX		
Tillamook	K20HT-D	12; 49	KPTV; KPDX		
Tillamook	K29LW-D	12; 49	KPTV; KPDX		
Tillamook	K35CR-D	12; 49	KPTV; KPDX		
Tri-City	K11GH-D	4	KPIC		
Tri-City	K13HM-D	4	KPIC	(Note: Licensed to Myrtle Creek, Oregon.)	
Tri-City	K35MS-D	34	KLSR-TV		
Tri-City	K22GX-D	46	KTCW		
~Boise, ID	K30QD-D	13	KTVR	(Note: Licensed to Ontario, Oregon.)	
~Kennewick, WA	K16LN-D	12; 49	KPTV; KPDX		

== Defunct ==
- KHTV Portland (6 July 1959–31 October 1959)
- KLOR Portland (1955–1957)
- KVDO-TV Salem (1970–1983)
