= Channel 34 digital TV stations in the United States =

The following television stations broadcast on digital channel 34 in the United States:

- K34AC-D in Yuma, Colorado, on virtual channel 3, which rebroadcasts KCDO-TV
- K34AF-D in Alexandria, Minnesota, on virtual channel 41, which rebroadcasts KPXM-TV
- K34AG-D in Parowan/Enoch, etc., Utah
- K34AI-D in La Pine, Oregon
- K34BL-D in Lovelock, Nevada
- K34CB-D in Lemhi, etc., Idaho
- K34CM-D in Ely, Nevada
- K34CR-D in Alamogordo, etc., New Mexico
- K34CX-D in Apple Valley, Utah
- K34DC-D in Astoria, Oregon, on virtual channel 6, which rebroadcasts KOIN
- K34DI-D in Pendleton, Oregon
- K34DJ-D in Phoenix, etc., Oregon
- K34DN-D in Whitewater, Montana
- K34DP-D in Plevna, Montana
- K34EE-D in Prescott-Cottonwood, Arizona, on virtual channel 61, which rebroadcasts KASW
- K34EU-D in Morongo Valley, California, on virtual channel 34
- K34FO-D in Alton, Utah
- K34FP-D in Valmy, Nevada
- K34FQ-D in Roy, New Mexico
- K34FR-D in Randolph & Woodruff, Utah
- K34FV-D in Duchesne, Utah, on virtual channel 9, which rebroadcasts KUEN
- K34GI-D in Trinidad, Colorado
- K34GM-D in Pierre, South Dakota
- K34GO-D in Fillmore, Utah
- K34GY-D in Culbertson, Montana
- K34HE-D in Elko, Nevada
- K34HF-D in Cuba, New Mexico
- K34HO-D in Willmar, Minnesota
- K34IB-D in Decatur, Nebraska
- K34IC-D in Glide, Oregon
- K34IN-D in Beaver, Oklahoma
- K34IS-D in Kilauea, Hawaii
- K34IW-D in Hanna, etc., Utah
- K34IY-D in Boulder, Utah
- K34JB-D in Vernal, etc., Utah, on virtual channel 11, which rebroadcasts KBYU-TV
- K34JD-D in Manila, etc., Utah
- K34JJ-D in Hollis, Oklahoma
- K34JK-D in Elk City, Oklahoma
- K34JR-D in Madras, Oregon
- K34JX-D in St. James, Minnesota
- K34KE-D in Hood River, Oregon, on virtual channel 8, which rebroadcasts KGW
- K34KJ-D in Crescent City, etc., California
- K34KK-D in Litchfield, California
- K34KL-D in Powers, Oregon
- K34KM-D in Basalt, Colorado
- K34KO-D in Tulia, Texas
- K34KP-D in Clear Creek, Utah
- K34KQ-D in Fountain Green, Utah
- K34KZ-D in Hobbs, New Mexico
- K34LE-D in Shurz, Nevada
- K34LI-D in Jean, Nevada
- K34LJ-D in Kabetogama, Minnesota
- K34LK-D in Beaumont, Texas
- K34LN-D in Cheyenne Wells, Colorado
- K34LS-D in Seneca, Oregon
- K34MC-D in Williams, Minnesota
- K34ME-D in Overton, Nevada
- K34MF-D in Orovada, Nevada
- K34MG-D in Garden Valley, Idaho
- K34MX-D in Odessa, Texas
- K34MZ-D in Prosser, Washington
- K34NA-D in Tampico, Montana
- K34NB-D in Lubbock, Texas
- K34NC-D in Fish Creek, etc., Idaho
- K34ND-D in Moses Lake, Washington
- K34NE-D in Lawton, Oklahoma
- K34NF-D in Soda Springs, Idaho
- K34NG-D in La Grande, Oregon
- K34NI-D in Florence, Oregon
- K34NL-D in Sargents, Colorado
- K34NM-D in Lamar, Colorado
- K34NN-D in Brewster & Pateros, Washington
- K34NO-D in Grants Pass, Oregon
- K34NP-D in Red Lake, Minnesota, on virtual channel 26, which rebroadcasts WFTC
- K34NQ-D in Memphis, Texas
- K34NS-D in Milton-Freewater, Oregon
- K34NT-D in Hanksville, Utah
- K34NU-D in Jackson, Minnesota
- K34NV-D in Frost, Minnesota
- K34NW-D in Rural Garfield County, Utah
- K34NY-D in Escalante, Utah
- K34NZ-D in Fremont, Utah
- K34OA-D in Washington, etc., Utah, on virtual channel 14, which rebroadcasts KJZZ-TV
- K34OB-D in Howard, Montana
- K34OC-D in Antimony, Utah
- K34OD-D in Tropic, etc., Utah
- K34OE-D in Manti, etc., Utah
- K34OF-D in Caineville, Utah
- K34OH-D in Montpelier, Idaho
- K34OI-D in Logan, Utah
- K34OJ-D in Park City, Utah, on virtual channel 7, which rebroadcasts KUED
- K34OK-D in Coalville, Utah
- K34OL-D in Wanship, Utah
- K34OM-D in Henefer, etc., Utah
- K34ON-D in Samak, Utah
- K34OO-D in Blanding/Monticello, Utah
- K34OP-D in Kanab, Utah
- K34OQ-D in Beaver etc., Utah
- K34OS-D in Sterling/South Logan County, Colorado, on virtual channel 31, which rebroadcasts KDVR
- K34OT-D in Toquerville & Leeds, Utah, on virtual channel 11, which rebroadcasts KBYU-TV
- K34OU-D in Beryl/Modena, etc., Utah
- K34OV-D in Washington, etc., Utah
- K34OW-D in Yreka, California
- K34OX-D in Delta, Oak City, etc., Utah
- K34OZ-D in Olivia, Minnesota
- K34PA-D in Garrison, etc., Utah
- K34PB-D in Emery, Utah
- K34PC-D in Green River, Utah
- K34PD-D in Spring Glen, Utah
- K34PE-D in Dolan Springs, Arizona
- K34PF-D in Scofield, Utah
- K34PG-D in Payson, Arizona, on virtual channel 38, which rebroadcasts K19IP-D
- K34PH-D in Ferron, Utah
- K34PJ-D in Tillamook, Oregon, on virtual channel 2, which rebroadcasts KATU
- K34PK-D in Tohatchi, New Mexico
- K34PL-D in Livingston, etc., Montana
- K34PM-D in Joplin, Montana
- K34PQ-D in Plains, Montana
- K34PT-D in Julesburg, Colorado, on virtual channel 2, which rebroadcasts KWGN-TV
- K34PU-D in Crested Butte, Colorado
- K34PV-D in Cortez, Colorado
- K34PW-D in Haxtun, Colorado, on virtual channel 9, which rebroadcasts KUSA
- K34PY-D in Mina/Luning, Nevada
- K34QB-D in Vail, Colorado, on virtual channel 45, which rebroadcasts K36DB-CD
- K34QC-D in Lewiston, Idaho
- K34QD-D in Bayfield & Ignacio, Colorado
- K34QJ-D in Panaca, Nevada
- K34QL-D in Fallon, Nevada
- K34QQ-D in Tahoe City, California
- K34QX-D in Roundup, Montana
- K34QY-D in Golden Valley, Arizona
- K41KX-D in Joplin, Missouri
- KACA-LD in Modesto, California, on virtual channel 34
- KASN in Pine Bluff, Arkansas
- KCBT-LD in Bakersfield, California
- KCDO-TV (DRT) in Sidney, Nebraska, on virtual channel 3
- KCYH-LD in Ardmore, Oklahoma
- KEVA-LD in Boise, Idaho, an ATSC 3.0 station.
- KEYE-TV in Austin, Texas
- KEZT-CD in Sacramento, California, on virtual channel 23, which rebroadcasts KUVS-DT
- KFSF-DT in Vallejo, California, on virtual channel 66
- KGPE in Fresno, California
- KGPX-TV in Spokane, Washington
- KHWB-LD in Eugene, Oregon
- KIAH in Houston, Texas, on virtual channel 39
- KIDV-LD in Albany, Texas
- KMEX-DT in Los Angeles, California, on virtual channel 34
- KMJD-LD in Kalispell, Montana
- KMSS-TV in Shreveport, Louisiana
- KMYT-TV in Tulsa, Oklahoma
- KOMI-CD in Woodward, Oklahoma
- KQIN in Davenport, Iowa
- KRCR-TV in Redding, California
- KSJF-CD in Poteau, Oklahoma
- KSOY-LD in McAllen, Texas
- KSPR-LD in Springfield, Missouri
- KSTR-DT in Irving, Texas, an ATSC 3.0 station, on virtual channel 49
- KSWL-LD in Lake Charles, Louisiana
- KTAS in San Luis Obispo, California
- KTCA-TV in Saint Paul, Minnesota, on virtual channel 2
- KTLP-LD in Pueblo, Colorado
- KTWC-LD in Crockett, Texas
- KUNP-LD in Portland, Oregon, on virtual channel 47, which rebroadcasts KUNP
- KUSD-TV in Vermillion, South Dakota
- KUTV in Salt Lake City, Utah, on virtual channel 2
- KUVE-DT in Green Valley, Arizona
- KVDO-LD in Albany, Oregon
- KVHP-LD in Jasper, Texas
- KVPA-LD in Phoenix, Arizona, on virtual channel 42
- KWDK in Tacoma, Washington, on virtual channel 56
- KWGN-TV in Denver, Colorado, an ATSC 3.0 station, on virtual channel 2
- KWRW-LD in Oklahoma City, Oklahoma
- KXTF in Twin Falls, Idaho
- KYDF-LD in Corpus Christi, Texas
- W34DQ-D in Pittsburg, New Hampshire
- W34DX-D in West Asheville, North Carolina
- W34EP-D in Sapphire Valley, etc., North Carolina
- W34EQ-D in Bangor, Maine
- W34ER-D in Clarksdale, Mississippi
- W34EY-D in Huntsville, Alabama
- W34FB-D in Hamilton, Alabama
- W34FC-D in La Crosse, Wisconsin
- W34FE-D in Parkersburg, West Virginia
- W34FF-D in Panama City, Florida
- W34FH-D in Marion, etc., North Carolina, on virtual channel 18, which rebroadcasts WBTV
- W34FK-D in Anasco, Puerto Rico, on virtual channel 33
- W34FL-D in Harrisburg/Lancaster, Pennsylvania
- W34FO-D in Augusta, Georgia
- W34FP-D in Eastlake, Ohio, on virtual channel 25, which rebroadcasts WVIZ
- W34FR-D in Ithaca, New York
- W34FX-D in Montrose, Georgia
- WACN-LD in Raleigh, North Carolina, on virtual channel 34
- WATC-DT in Atlanta, Georgia, on virtual channel 57
- WBGS-LD in Bowling Green, Kentucky
- WBIH in Selma, Alabama
- WBXJ-CD in Jacksonville, Florida
- WCIA in Champaign, Illinois
- WCMV in Cadillac, Michigan
- WCPX-TV in Chicago, Illinois, on virtual channel 38
- WDAF-TV in Kansas City, Missouri, on virtual channel 4
- WDNP-LD in St. Petersburg, Florida, on virtual channel 36
- WFBI-LD in South East Memphis, Tennessee
- WFTX-TV in Cape Coral, Florida
- WFXT in Boston, Massachusetts, on virtual channel 25
- WFXV in Utica, New York
- WGWG in Charleston, South Carolina
- WHBH-CD in Booneville, Mississippi
- WHBR in Pensacola, Florida
- WHDT in Stuart, Florida
- WHSV-TV (DRT) in Massanutten, Virginia, on virtual channel 3
- WIDO-LD in Wilmington, North Carolina
- WIDP in Guayama, Puerto Rico, on virtual channel 46
- WIPX-LD in Indianapolis, Indiana, on virtual channel 34
- WISE-TV in Fort Wayne, Indiana
- WIVM-LD in Canton, Ohio, on virtual channel 39
- WJHJ-LD in Newport News, etc., Virginia
- WJNK-LD in Nashville, Tennessee, on virtual channel 34.
- WKBD-TV in Detroit, Michigan, on virtual channel 50
- WKBW-TV in Buffalo, New York
- WKEF in Dayton, Ohio
- WKMJ-TV in Louisville, Kentucky
- WMHT in Schenectady, New York
- WNPB-TV in Morgantown, West Virginia, on virtual channel 24
- WNSC-TV in Rock Hill, South Carolina, on virtual channel 30
- WOOD-TV in Grand Rapids, Michigan
- WPEM-LD in Lumberton, North Carolina
- WPPX-TV in Wilmington, Delaware, on virtual channel 61
- WPXI (DRT) in New Castle, Pennsylvania, on virtual channel 11
- WPXN-TV in New York, New York, on virtual channel 31
- WPXT in Portland, Maine
- WQEC in Quincy, Illinois
- WRBJ-TV in Magee, Mississippi
- WRC-TV in Washington, D.C., on virtual channel 4
- WRJT-LD in Wausau, Wisconsin
- WSIL-TV in Harrisburg, Illinois
- WSJZ-LD in Salisbury, Maryland
- WSLS-TV in Roanoke, Virginia
- WSST-TV in Cordele, Georgia
- WSWB in Scranton, Pennsylvania
- WTGB-LD in Gainesville, Florida
- WTGL in Leesburg, Florida, uses WUCF-TV's spectrum, on virtual channel 45
- WTIC-TV in Hartford, Connecticut, on virtual channel 61
- WUCF-TV in Orlando, Florida, on virtual channel 21
- WVLA-TV in Baton Rouge, Louisiana
- WVLT-TV in Knoxville, Tennessee
- WWKQ-LD in Quebradillas, Puerto Rico
- WWRS-TV in Mayville, Wisconsin, on virtual channel 52
- WXVK-LD in Columbus, Georgia
- WYBE-CD in Pinehurst, North Carolina, on virtual channel 44
- WYCI in Saranac Lake, New York
- WYJJ-LD in Jackson, Tennessee
- WZDC-CD in Washington D.C., uses WRC-TV's spectrum, on virtual channel 44
- WZTD-LD in Richmond, Virginia

The following stations, which are no longer licensed, formerly broadcast on digital channel 34:

- K34EF-D in Kingman, Arizona
- K34FI-D in Bozeman, Montana
- K34IF-D in Wallowa, Oregon
- K34IV-D in Fruitland, Utah
- K34JA-D in Richfield, etc., Utah
- K34KX-D in Rolla, Missouri
- K34KY-D in Mountain Home, Idaho
- K34LC-D in Rifle, etc., Colorado
- K34LR-D in Salinas, California
- K34OG-D in Little America, etc., Wyoming
- K34PO-D in Billings, Montana
- K34QA-D in Klamath Falls, Oregon
- KEFB in Ames, Iowa
- KFNM-LD in Farmington, New Mexico
- KMZM-LD in Cedar Falls, Iowa
- KQLD-LD in Lincoln, Nebraska
- W34ED-D in Trujillo Alto, Puerto Rico
- W34EH-D in Champaign, Illinois
- W34FV-D in Soperton, Georgia
- WHTV in Jackson, Michigan
