= KVAL-TV =

Television station in Eugene, Oregon

- Eugene, Oregon; United States
- Channels: Digital: 28 (UHF); Virtual: 13
- Branding: KVAL CBS 13; KVAL News

Programming
- Affiliations: 13.1: CBS; for others, see § Subchannels

Ownership
- Owner: Sinclair Broadcast Group; (Sinclair Eugene Licensee, LLC)
- Sister stations: KMTR

History
- First air date: April 15, 1954
- Former channel numbers: Analog: 13 (VHF, 1954–2009); Digital: 25 (UHF, 2001–2009), 13 (VHF, 2009–2021)
- Former affiliations: NBC (1954–1982); DuMont (secondary, 1954–1955); ABC (secondary, 1954–1960); CBS (secondary, 1954–1960; per program, 1978–1982)
- Call sign meaning: Willamette Valley

Technical information
- Licensing authority: FCC
- Facility ID: 49766
- ERP: 1,000 kW
- HAAT: 441 m (1,447 ft)
- Transmitter coordinates: 44°0′6″N 123°6′57″W
- Translator(s): see § Rebroadcasters

Links
- Public license information: Public file; LMS
- Website: kval.com

KVAL-TV (channel 13) is a television station in Eugene, Oregon, United States, affiliated with CBS. It is owned by Sinclair Broadcast Group alongside dual NBC/CW+ affiliate KMTR (channel 16). The two stations share studios on Blanton Road in Eugene, where KVAL's transmitter is also located. KMTR maintained separate facilities on International Court in Springfield, Oregon, until 2020 when the station relocated to KVAL's building; master control and some internal operations for KMTR were based at the KVAL studios.

KVAL-TV reaches additional viewers in west-central Oregon via co-owned full-power semi-satellites KCBY-TV (channel 11) in Coos Bay and KPIC (channel 4) in Roseburg.

== History ==
The station began broadcasting on April 15, 1954, locally owned by Eugene Television. Originally, it carried programming from all three networks, but was primarily an NBC affiliate. It lost CBS and ABC when KEZI signed on in 1960. Eugene Television bought KBCI-TV (now KBOI-TV) in Boise, Idaho, in 1975 and changed its name to Northwest Television.

In the summer of 1978, as NBC was floundering in third place in the Nielsen ratings, KVAL started airing five hours of CBS programming each week. During the next four years, the station gradually offered more programs from CBS. NBC affiliated with newly signed-on KMTR in 1982, and KVAL formally switched its affiliation to CBS.

Retlaw Enterprises (a company owned by relatives of Walt Disney—Retlaw being "Walter" spelled backwards) bought the station in 1996. Fisher Communications bought Retlaw's entire broadcasting division, including KVAL, in 1998.

Many KVAL alumni have gone on to be elected into office. Susan Castillo, the last person to be elected Oregon state schools superintendent prior to its abolition as an elective office, is a former KVAL reporter. Former Secretary of State Bill Bradbury, who left office in January 2009, is also a former reporter and on-air personality. Bradbury and Castillo also served in the Oregon Legislature, as did KVAL alumni Wayne Whitehead and Mark Hass.

In September 2000, KVAL debuted an original sports program, Inside the Pac, a reference to the Pac-12 Conference which then included the University of Oregon and Oregon State University, both in KVAL's coverage area. Inside the Pac was created after the Oregon Sports Network TV contract went to local rival KEZI, along with the seasonal weekly program featuring Oregon Ducks football head coach Mike Bellotti. Airing each Sunday afternoon, Inside the Pac features game highlights and talk about Pac-12 sports. It was originally hosted by former KVAL sports director and longtime Eugene TV broadcaster Todd McKim, who left KVAL in 2005. Also featured on the show as in-studio guests are former college football players from Oregon and Oregon State, who share their knowledge and experience.

On April 11, 2013, Fisher announced that it would sell its properties, including KVAL, KCBY, and KPIC, to the Sinclair Broadcast Group. The deal was completed on August 8, 2013.

On August 12, 2025, Sinclair announced that it would acquire full ownership of KMTR and its satellites from Roberts Media for an undisclosed price, creating a legal duopoly with KVAL. Sinclair used a failing station waiver to facilitate the transaction. The sale was completed on February 10, 2026.

== News operation ==
In December 2005, KVAL launched a newscast called Northwest News at 10 on Fox for local Fox affiliate KLSR-TV (channel 34). Katie Dyer anchored the newscast until April 2007, when Natasha Chugthai took over. This newscast came into its own in April 2007, with a new graphics scheme similar to that of such Fox affiliates as WNYW in New York and KTTV in Los Angeles. In August 2007, the newscast got its own theme music, rather than continuing to share the opening tune with KVAL. In March 2008, Northwest News at 10 was renamed Fox News @ 10 for the live weekday broadcast, and KVAL News @ 10 on Fox for the weekend repeats of the evening news. KVAL's 6 a.m. hour of morning news is replayed on KLSR at 7 a.m.

In September 2007, KVAL's morning news started airing from 5 to 7 a.m., beating rival KMTR, whose morning newscasts start at 5:30 a.m. KEZI soon announced it would begin to broadcast from 5 to 7 a.m. as well, branding the early-morning newscast with a new look and a new team.

In October 2008, Al Peterson, former KEZI morning news anchor, joined KVAL's morning news team. He replaced Seth Wayne, who moved to a station in Tucson, Arizona. The day Peterson took over, KVAL, like most other Fisher stations, adopted a new graphics scheme heavily emphasizing the station's CBS affiliation. KVAL also rebranded its news as KVAL News, dropping the 50-year-old Northwest News. The station also adopted a new news slogan: "First, Fair, Accurate." On May 10, 2010, KVAL News debuted a new set and started broadcasting newscasts in 16:9 widescreen.

In spring 2012, the news departments at KCBY and KPIC were merged into KVAL's news department. Previously, the semi-satellites' newsrooms were controlled by their own news directors who each supervised two to three reporters. Today, the KVAL news director oversees content at all three stations. During the third block during the 5 and 6 p.m. news and second block during the 11 p.m. news, KCBY and KPIC air pre-recorded four-minute local inserts that include a local weather forecast. In the mornings, KPIC and KCBY have five minutes of local news at 6:55 a.m., and produce their own local cut-ins during CBS Mornings. Roseburg and Coos Bay content is also interwoven into KVAL and KLSR's news. If there is a major breaking news or severe weather event in Roseburg or Coos Bay, Eugene viewers will see the KPIC or KCBY on-air staff, respectively. On a normal day, they do not because the signals are not switched for viewers in Eugene, or on the Eugene DirecTV and Dish Network feeds. Usually while the semi-satellites are running the local segments, a long block of weather is aired in Eugene and on satellite.

On February 26, 2020, KVAL debuted a new set and became the second station in Eugene to broadcast news in HD.

== Technical information ==
=== Subchannels ===
The stations' digital signals are multiplexed:

Subchannels of KVAL-TV, KPIC, and KCBY-TV
Channel			Res.	Short name			Programming
KVAL-TV	KPIC	KCBY-TV	Res.	KVAL-TV	KPIC	KCBY-TV	Programming
13.1	4.1	11.1	1080i	CBS13	CBS4	CBS11	CBS
13.2	4.2	11.2	480i	ROAR			Roar / Rip City Television Network
13.3	4.3	11.3	480i	Charge!			Charge!
13.4	4.4	11.4	480i	TheNest		TheNest	The Nest

On September 23, 2024, the Portland Trail Blazers announced an agreement with Sinclair to launch Rip City Television Network, which will syndicate games over-the-air. Games in Eugene will air on KVAL's second subchannel, which will also allow games to be aired on KCBY's second subchannel in Coos Bay and KPIC's second subchannel in Roseburg.

=== Analog-to-digital conversion ===
KVAL-TV ended regular programming on its analog signal, over VHF channel 13, on June 12, 2009, the official date on which full-power television stations in the United States transitioned from analog to digital broadcasts under federal mandate. The station's digital signal relocated from its pre-transition UHF channel 25 to VHF channel 13.

As part of the SAFER Act, KPIC kept its analog signal on the air until July 12 to inform viewers of the digital television transition through a loop of public service announcements from the National Association of Broadcasters.

=== Rebroadcasters ===
==== Semi-satellites ====
Semi-satellites of KVAL-TV (Note: Both KCBY-TV and KPIC maintain separate studio facilities/newsrooms, and air local commercials targeting the Coos Bay and Roseburg areas.)
Station	City of license	Channels RF / VC	First air date	Call letters' meaning	ERP	HAAT	Facility ID	Transmitter coordinates	Transmitter location	Public license information	Website
KCBY-TV	Coos Bay	11 (VHF) (to move to 34 (UHF)); 11	October 1, 1960	Coos Bay	5 kW; 430 kW (CP)	192 m (630 ft)	49750	43°23′25.4″N 124°7′50.3″W	atop Noah Butte	Public file LMS	www.kcby.com
KPIC (Note: KPIC is licensed to South West Oregon TV Broadcasting Corporation, which is half-owned by Sinclair and half-owned by California Oregon Broadcasting.)	Roseburg	19 (UHF); 4	April 1, 1956	Television picture	50 kW	292 m (958 ft)	61551	43°14′7″N 123°19′22″W	atop Mount Rose, east of Roseburg	Public file LMS	www.kpic.com

==== Translators ====
- K29KR-D Camas Valley (translates KPIC)
- K26MZ-D Cottage Grove (translates KVAL-TV)
- K24MF-D Florence (translates KVAL-TV)
- K26HO-D Glide (translates KPIC)
- K33CP-D Gold Beach (translates KCBY-TV)
- K27JY-D London Springs (translates KVAL-TV)
- K21LY-D Mapleton (translates KVAL-TV)
- K13HM-D Myrtle Creek (translates KPIC)
- K35MT-D Port Orford (translates KCBY-TV)
- K24MH-D Powers (translates KCBY-TV)
- KPIC (DRT) Roseburg (translates KPIC)
- K21MB-D Scottsburg (translates KVAL-TV)
- K15KB-D Squaw Valley (translates KCBY-TV)
- K11GH-D Tri-City, etc. (translates KPIC)

Low-power translators in Elkton, Glendale, Mapleton, Myrtle Point, Newport, Oakland, Oakridge, and Swisshome have been decommissioned.
