= WB 11 =

WB 11 may refer to one of the following television stations that were formerly affiliated with The WB:

- KBDA, branding for cable-only service of KVII-TV in Amarillo, Texas
- KPLR-TV, St. Louis, Missouri
- KZWB, branding for cable-only service of KMTR, Eugene, Oregon
- WPIX, New York City, New York
- KNTV, San Jose, California (2000–2001)
- WBXI (The CW Plus), Binghamton, New York (cable-only affiliate)
- WBU, branding for cable-only service of WKTV in Utica, New York
- KWBM, branding for cable-only service of KTVQ in Billings, Montana
- KMFD, branding for cable-only service of KTVL in Medford, Oregon
