= KVDO =

KVDO may refer to:

== Radio/TV Stations ==
- KVDO-LD, a low-power television station (channel 34, virtual 17) licensed to serve Albany, Oregon, United States
- KOAB-TV, a television station (channel 11, virtual 3) licensed to serve Bend, Oregon, which held the call sign KVDO-TV from 1970 to 1983
- KVDO-LP, a defunct low-power television station (channel 25) formerly licensed to serve Clear Lake, Texas, United States

== Sport ==
- K.V. Diksmuide-Oostende, a Belgian football club from Oostende, previously Diskmuide.
