= KLSR-TV =

Television station in Eugene, Oregon

- Eugene, Oregon; United States
- Channels: Digital: 31 (UHF); Virtual: 34
- Branding: Fox 34

Programming
- Affiliations: 34.1: Fox; 34.2: Independent with MyNetworkTV

Ownership
- Owner: Cox Media Group; (Oregon Broadcasting Licenses, LLC)
- Sister stations: KEVU-CD

History
- First air date: June 12, 1987 (Note: Of KLSR, as K25AS, a low-power station. This technical facility is now KEVU-CD. The full-service channel 34 facility began September 30, 1991.)
- Former call signs: K25AS (1987–1997)
- Former channel numbers: Analog: 25 (UHF, 1987–1997); 34 (UHF, 1997–2009)
- Call sign meaning: Station branded as "Laser 25" at launch

Technical information
- Licensing authority: FCC
- Facility ID: 8322
- ERP: 88 kW
- HAAT: 372 m (1,220 ft)
- Transmitter coordinates: 44°0′3″N 123°6′49″W
- Translator(s): see § Translators

Links
- Public license information: Public file; LMS
- Website: www.oregonsfox.com

KLSR-TV (channel 34) is a television station in Eugene, Oregon, United States, affiliated with the Fox network. It is owned by Cox Media Group alongside KEVU-CD (channel 23), an independent station with MyNetworkTV. The two stations share studios on Chad Drive in Eugene; KLSR's transmitter is located on Blanton Heights.

KLSR began as a low-power station (officially K25AS) on June 12, 1987, with a format consisting primarily of music videos. Although it lacked cable carriage until 1989, its strong viewership within months of launching allowed it to secure a Fox affiliation. Despite being a low-power station, it produced its own prime time newscast for several years. It remained the Eugene Fox affiliate even though a full-power station, KEVU, began on channel 34 in 1991. California Oregon Broadcasting, Inc. acquired KLSR in 1993 and KEVU in 1994; though it stated its intention to move the Fox programming to the full-power channel 34 at the time, it did not do so until April 1, 1997. Cox Media Group acquired KLSR in 2022. Eugene CBS affiliate KVAL-TV produces 7 and 10 p.m. newscasts for KLSR-TV on weeknights.

== History ==
On June 12, 1987, a low-power television station began broadcasting in Eugene. Bearing the call sign K25AS but known as KLSR, the station was owned by Metrocom of Oregon and initially featured music videos on weekdays. Three Eugene-area radio personalities as well as the general manager and others held down on-air shifts during the week, and the station also presented on-the-hour newscasts and more traditional syndicated programming on the weekends. During midday, it aired a bingo program that gave out prizes to participants. It also had a morning show; Christopher Judge, a former University of Oregon football player, won the contest to host it, launching his acting career. Despite lacking coverage on cable, KLSR was successful enough to garner a one-percent share of the audience later in 1987, a feat that earned it an affiliation with the Fox network in January 1988. KLSR was the first low-power station to affiliate with Fox. In 1989, the station added a translator to serve Corvallis. KLSR struggled to secure a slot on the Tele-Communications Inc. cable system in Eugene and did not do so until 1989, first on a shared-time basis with KTVU from Oakland, California, and then on a full-time basis beginning in 1990. That year, KLSR signed a three-year deal with the Portland Trail Blazers basketball team to carry games that in other parts of the state were distributed on cable systems.

Originally operating from studios on 18th Avenue, it had relocated to Goodpasture Island Road by October 1992, when Metrocom agreed to sell it to California Oregon Broadcasting, Inc. (COBI) for $3.15 million. Metrocom sold because its primary stakeholder, the Arctic Slope Regional Corporation, wished to exit broadcasting; COBI owned KOBI-TV in Medford and expanded into Eugene in response to Eugene-based Chambers Communications expanding into the Medford market. After closing on KLSR, COBI acquired a Eugene full-power station in 1994. KEVU (channel 34) was built by Raul Palazuelos and began broadcasting on September 30, 1991, as a low-budget independent station. COBI initially promised that the Fox affiliation would move to KEVU upon approval of the transaction, but KEVU continued on channel 34 and affiliated with UPN when it launched in January 1995.

On April 1, 1997, COBI moved KLSR to channel 34—which became KLSR-TV—and KEVU to the low-power channel 25 as KEVU-LP; the stations retained their existing cable numbers, only exchanging transmission facilities. That year, the station began construction on a new studio facility on Chad Drive, designed to house a news department. COBI was fined $13,000 by the Federal Communications Commission (FCC) in November 2012. The company had failed to file paperwork for children's E/I programming for KLSR-TV's Eugene translator, K19GH-D, in the previous four years, even though it was filed for the main station.

In 2022, California Oregon Broadcasting, Inc. sold KLSR-TV and KEVU-CD to Atlanta-based Cox Media Group for $7,222,000. Under a local marketing agreement first signed in 2021, KLSR–KEVU's sales force markets the advertising time on Eugene radio station KORE (1050 AM).

== Newscasts ==
As early as 1989, KLSR produced its own 10 p.m. newscast, known as Prime Time News. In October 1991, KLSR entered into a deal with Eugene CBS affiliate KVAL-TV (channel 13) to produce the 10 p.m. newscast on its behalf for at least six months; it lasted two years before KVAL opted to exit the partnership, citing low ratings. In the mid-1990s, KLSR aired a half-hour of Northwest Cable News at 10 p.m.

Under a news share arrangement, KVAL-TV currently produces 7 and 10 p.m. newscasts for KLSR-TV on weeknights, as well as rebroadcasts of KVAL's weekend evening newscasts and a weekday half-hour at 7 a.m. The 10 p.m. news was a half-hour except between 2016 and 2017, when it was broadcast as a full hour.

== Technical information ==
=== Subchannels ===
KLSR-TV's transmitter is located on Blanton Heights. The station's signal is multiplexed:

Subchannels of KLSR-TV
Subchannel	Res.	Short name	Programming
34.1	720p	KLSR-HD	Fox
34.2	720p	KEVU-DT	KEVU-CD (Independent with MyNetworkTV)

Simulcast of subchannels of another station

=== Analog-to-digital conversion ===
KLSR-TV, along with KEZI, opted to shut down its analog signal on the original digital television transition date of February 17, 2009. The station's digital signal remained on its pre-transition UHF channel 31, using virtual channel 34.

=== Translators ===
KLSR-TV's signal is rebroadcast by translators to communities throughout southern and south-central Oregon:

- Canyonville, etc.: K35MS-D
- Coos Bay: K30BN-D
- Corvallis: K14GW-D
- Cottage Grove: K32LW-D
- Eugene: K19GH-D
- Florence: K28NZ-D
- London Springs: K23OS-D
- Powers: K32LJ-D
- Roseburg: K33NY-D
- Yoncalla: K32FI-D
