= Oregon Sports Properties =

Defunct service for University of Oregon sports

Oregon Sports Properties is a division of Learfield which handles the sports broadcasting, accommodation, and billboard rights for the teams of the University of Oregon's athletic programs and its venues. Until 2012, it was known as the Oregon Sports Network (abbreviated to OSN) and also handled the school's television rights. It launched in 1987 to handle the team's radio rights, with KUGN in Eugene the school's longtime flagship radio station since 1959, outside the period between 1987 and 1995 where KPNW served as the flagship with OSN producing broadcasts. Later, its television coverage aired on NBC Sports Northwest, with additional coverage carried on KLSR and KEVU. OSN contracted with KEZI to host and produce its coaches' shows for football and men's and women's basketball.

The network's television operations were wound down completely by the start of the 2012–13 academic year, when the Pac-12 Networks were launched and OSN's sports rights were given over to the conference, and its remaining audio and web operations are now a part of Learfield.
