= Southern Oregon PBS =

PBS member network serving southwest Oregon

KSYS and KFTS
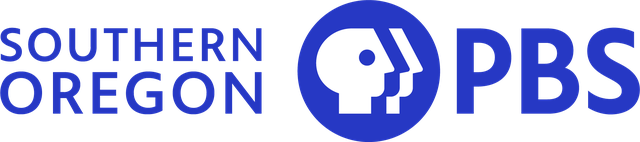

KSYS: Medford, Oregon; KFTS: Klamath Falls, Oregon; United States
- Channels for KSYS: Digital: 8 (VHF); Virtual: 8
- Channels for KFTS: Digital: 33 (UHF); Virtual: 22
- Branding: Southern Oregon PBS, SOPBS (alternate)

Programming
- Affiliations: 8.1/22.1: PBS; for others, see § Subchannels

Ownership
- Owner: Southern Oregon Public Television, Inc.

History
- First air date: KSYS: January 17, 1977; KFTS: January 27, 1989
- Former channel number: KSYS: Analog: 8 (VHF, 1977–2009); Digital: 42 (UHF, until 2009); KFTS: Analog: 22 (UHF, 1989–2009)
- Call sign meaning: KSYS: "SYS"kiyou Mountains (sic); KFTS: Klamath Falls Television Service

Technical information
- Licensing authority: FCC
- Facility ID: KSYS: 61350; KFTS: 61335
- ERP: KSYS: 16.9 kW; KFTS: 9.6 kW
- HAAT: KSYS: 818 m (2,684 ft); KFTS: 649 m (2,129 ft)
- Transmitter coordinates: KSYS: 42°41′31.4″N 123°13′49.2″W; KFTS: 42°5′49.5″N 121°38′2.9″W
- Translator: see § Translators

Links
- Public license information: KSYS: Public file; LMS; KFTS: Public file; LMS
- Website: www.sopbs.org

Southern Oregon PBS (SOPBS, formerly Southern Oregon Public Television or SOPTV) is the collective brand for two PBS member television stations serving southern Oregon, United States: KSYS (channel 8) in Medford and KFTS (channel 22) in Klamath Falls. The stations are owned by Southern Oregon Public Television, Inc., and maintain studios on South Fir Street in downtown Medford. KSYS' transmitter is located on King Mountain, while KFTS' tower sits atop Stukel Mountain.

KFTS operates as a full-time satellite of KSYS for the Klamath Falls side of the market; on-air references are limited to Federal Communications Commission (FCC)–mandated hourly station identifications during programming.

== History ==
In 1965, Oregon Educational Broadcasting (OEB), forerunner of Oregon Public Broadcasting (OPB), persuaded the Federal Communications Commission (FCC) to reassign channel 8 from Brookings to Medford. OEB intended to make channel 8 the third station in its television network, which at that time included flagship KOAC-TV in Corvallis and KOAP-TV (now KOPB-TV) in Portland. Southern Oregon was the only region of the state without public television.

However, channel 8 at Medford was not reserved for noncommercial applicants, and two commercial applicants also demonstrated interest in the channel. The Medford Printing Company owned the Mail Tribune newspaper and radio station KYCJ. A joint venture of Liberty Television, owners of KEZI in Eugene and several cable systems, and Medford-based Siskiyou Broadcasting, also filed. Both commercial groups sought to operate channel 8 as an ABC affiliate.

The FCC slated the applications from the Oregon Board of Higher Education, Medford Printing, and the Liberty/Siskiyou joint venture for hearing in December 1967, alongside an objection by the Southern Oregon Broadcasting Company, owner of KTVM channel 5, which believed a third commercial outlet in Medford would cause economic harm to its business. The state dropped out in May 1968, and after Medford Printing failed to respond, the commission awarded the construction permit to Liberty and Siskiyou in 1969.

Liberty and Siskiyou, however, were impeded from building the channel due to continued objections from KOBI (the former KTVM); the final petition for reconsideration from that station was denied in March 1971. Even after those were dismissed, Liberty hesitated to build the station, designated KSYS, which would have made Medford into the smallest market in the country with three commercial TV stations.

The owners of the two commercial stations in the area—Bill Smullin of KOBI and Ray Johnson of KMED-TV (now KTVL)—helped a new non-profit corporation, Southern Oregon Educational Company, buy the channel 8 construction permit from Liberty. (Liberty claimed the growth of cable TV in the region reduced the need for a third commercial outlet.) They also pledged payments of $50,000 once the station signed on. Getting the funds to buy necessary equipment proved more difficult than expected, presumably because the Department of Health, Education and Welfare (HEW) balked at donating to a non-profit that was backed by two commercial broadcasters.

With the FCC permit about to run out, KSYS went on the air on January 17, 1977, from a transmitter on the Jackson–Josephine county line with the strongest signal of any station in the region, at 191,000 watts. (The FCC redesignated channel 8 as reserved noncommercial in December 1977 and instead allocated channel 12 to Medford for a third network station, leading to the establishment of KDRV seven years later.)

Originally, Klamath Falls was served by a low-powered translator. In 1986, SOEC (later renamed Southern Oregon Public Television, Inc.) immediately applied for another full-power station to cover the Klamath Valley. It would be another three years before that station, KFTS, went on the air in January 1989 from a transmitter just south of the city.

The two stations are the only public television stations in the state not affiliated with OPB, but occasionally air some of OPB's programs. They also carry local, PBS, and American Public Television programs, along with programs from other distributors.

In December 2019, the station renamed itself to Southern Oregon PBS as part of a national initiative of PBS stations to clarify their roles in their communities.

== Technical information ==
=== Subchannels ===
The stations' digital signals are multiplexed:

Southern Oregon PBS multiplex
Channel		Res.	Short name	Programming
KSYS	KFTS	Res.	Short name	Programming
8.1	22.1	1080i	SOPTVHD	PBS
8.2	22.2	480i	PBSWRLD	World
8.3	22.3	480i	CREATE	Create
8.4	22.4	480i	PBSKIDS	PBS Kids

SO PBS is also one of the partners of The Oregon Channel, a public affairs network. Programming consists of Oregon legislative sessions and other public affairs events. It was previously featured also on the x.4 subchannel, until it was made available exclusively on cable.

=== Analog-to-digital conversion ===
SOPTV's stations shut down their analog signals on February 17, 2009, the original target date on which full-power television stations in the United States were to transition from analog to digital broadcasts under federal mandate (which was later pushed back to June 12, 2009). The station's digital channel allocations post-transition are as follows:

- KSYS shut down its analog signal, over VHF channel 8; the station's digital signal relocated from its pre-transition UHF channel 42 to VHF channel 8 due to problems caused by UHF's severe terrain limitations.
- KFTS shut down its analog signal, over UHF channel 22; the station's digital signal remained on its pre-transition UHF channel 33, using virtual channel 22. In 2018, SOPTV transitioned from channel 42 down to channel 34 due to the federally-mandated television repack. (Despite this change, most television sets' metadata continues to show viewers receiving channel 8.)

=== Translators ===
KSYS is rebroadcast on the following translators:

- K15IM-D Brookings, etc.
- K22IQ-D Cave Junction
- K27KW-D Gold Hill, etc.
- K19HS-D Grants Pass
- K34DJ-D Phoenix, etc.
- K13PF-D Pinehurst
- K02JG-D Prospect
- K13PI-D Ruch & Applegate
- K13PE-D Shady Cove
- K02JJ-D Williams
