= Chambers Communications =

American broadcasting company

Chambers Communications Corporation was a broadcasting company based in Eugene, Oregon. With roots back to 1959, Chambers Communications was founded by Carolyn S. Chambers and owned a chain of ABC affiliates in Western, Central Oregon and Southern Oregon. Chambers also owned a state-of-the-art film and video production company and studios in Eugene, Oregon. Chambers was the former owner of the cable system in Sunriver, Oregon, but on July 25, 2013 announced that it had sold the small system to BendBroadband's Zolo Media, the advertising and broadcast arm of the regional cable and wireless provider in nearby Bend, Oregon. On March 5, 2014, Chambers Communications announced that it would exit broadcasting and sell its stations to Heartland Media, a company owned by former Gray Television executive Bob Prather.

== Stations owned by Chambers ==
- KEZI channel 9, Eugene, Oregon
- KDRV channel 12, Medford, Oregon
- KDKF channel 31, Klamath Falls, Oregon (semi-satellite of KDRV)
- KOHD channel 51, Bend, Oregon (sold to Zolo Media in July 2013)

== See also ==
- List of companies based in Oregon
