= KTVL =

Television station in Medford, Oregon

- Medford–Klamath Falls, Oregon; United States
- City: Medford, Oregon
- Channels: Digital: 10 (VHF), to move to 16 (UHF); Virtual: 10
- Branding: KTVL 10; Southern Oregon CW 11 (10.2)

Programming
- Affiliations: 10.1: CBS; 10.2: CW+; for others, see § Subchannels

Ownership
- Owner: Sinclair Broadcast Group; (KTVL Licensee, LLC)

History
- First air date: October 3, 1961
- Former call signs: KMED-TV (1961–1977)
- Former channel numbers: Analog: 10 (VHF, 1961–2009); Digital: 35 (UHF, until 2009)
- Former affiliations: NBC (1961–1983); ABC (secondary, 1961–1978)
- Call sign meaning: The "TV" refers to the fact that it is a television station; the "L" does not stand for anything.

Technical information
- Licensing authority: FCC
- Facility ID: 22570
- ERP: 25 kW; 350 kW (CP)
- HAAT: 1,001 m (3,284 ft)
- Transmitter coordinates: 42°4′51.5″N 122°43′13″W
- Translator(s): see § Translators

Links
- Public license information: Public file; LMS
- Website: ktvl.com; southernoregoncw.com

KTVL (channel 10) is a television station in Medford, Oregon, United States, affiliated with CBS and The CW Plus. Owned by Sinclair Broadcast Group, the station has studios on North Fir Street in downtown Medford, and its transmitter is located atop Mount Ashland, 15 miles (24 km) south of the city.

== History ==
Channel 10 signed on the air on October 3, 1961, as KMED-TV, owned by Ray Johnson and his company, Radio Medford, Inc., along with KMED radio (1440 AM). Several groups contended for the second television station in the area, but Radio Medford received a substantial assist from Bill Smulin, owner of KTVM (channel 5, now KOBI), who offered Radio Medford space on KTVM's tower. KMED-TV was an NBC affiliate, since KMED had been an NBC radio affiliate since 1937. It also shared ABC with KTVM.

In 1963, the station started a joint news department with its radio sister. KMED radio had set up the first full radio news department between Portland and San Francisco in 1957.

In 1966, the station moved to a new tower on Mount Ashland, which added Klamath Falls to its city-grade coverage. It is the highest transmitting tower in the Pacific Northwest. To this day, channel 10 is the only Medford station that covers the entire market without a full-power satellite station.

KMED-TV bought the first color cameras in Southern Oregon in 1968, a year of many firsts for the station. That year also saw the area's first live remote broadcast, the first television editorials and the first use of live microwave technology.

In 1977, KMED was sold off, and KMED-TV became KTVL. A year later, the station picked up some CBS programs after KOBI switched its primary affiliation to ABC. In 1981, Johnson sold KTVL to Freedom Communications, marking Freedom's entry into television. Under Freedom's ownership, KTVL aired the first color weather forecast in Southern Oregon. In the meantime Johnson was working on another station, which would become KTVZ in Bend, Oregon.

In 1983, KTVL became a CBS affiliate, and KOBI switched to NBC. ABC programming would not return to the market until KDRV (channel 12) signed on a year later.

Freedom announced on November 2, 2011, that it would bow out of television and sell its stations, including KTVL, to Sinclair Broadcast Group. On April 2, 2012, Sinclair took over official ownership of the station as shown at their website.

In late 2022, KTVL moved its news operations from its original Rossanley Drive location northwest of Medford to its current location in the old Medford Mail Tribune building at 111 North Fir Street in downtown Medford. The entire office would soon follow a few months later.

== Local programming ==
=== Local news operation (1961–2023) ===
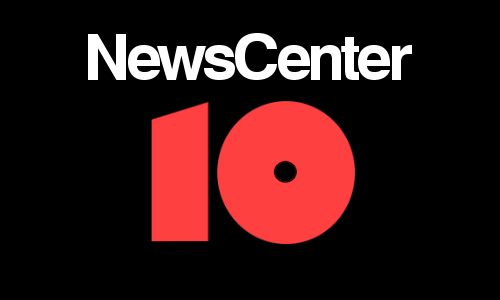
Logo from 1981 to 1983

KTVL had broadcast 22 hours of locally production news each week. It was known as NewsCenter 10 in the late 1970s back when they were an NBC affiliate. The name NewsCenter was used by many NBC-owned and/or affiliated stations to identify their newscasts. After KTVL switched to CBS, the name of the newscast was changed to Channel 10 News, then again to News 10.

The news department featured well-known news personalities such as Terry Miller, Hank Henry, George Warren, Leon Hunsaker (also previously of KOBI and theDove TV), Marvin Rhodes, Pete Belcastro, Fred Inglis (formerly of KTVU), Milt Radford (also previously of KDRV) and, most notably, Ann Curry (who went on to become host of NBC's Today Show in 2011). The last news director was Chad Hypes.

The newscasts were last anchored by Carmine Gemei and Tyler Myerly at 5, 6 and 11 p.m. The chief meteorologist was Holden LeCroy. Myerly previously anchored the 5 a.m. newscast News 10 Good Morning. Mollie Smith and weather-caster Tiffany Olin anchored the region's only noon newscast previously anchored by such talent as Libby Dowsett, April Warneke and later-main anchor Trish Glose. It was considered the "usual amount of news for a CBS affiliate."

KTVL did not have a full-time local sportscast after 2009 as it was dropped by previous management. However, in 2012 the news team began covering local high school football and basketball highlights called Friday Night Fastbreaks (KDRV is now the only station in the market to continue airing a local sportscast and KOBI does not have a sports department.)

==== News 10 Good Morning ====
KTVL's News 10 logo through 2023

On January 24, 2011, KTVL added an additional hour to their morning news program. Originally, it was News 10 at 6 a.m. but they changed the start time to 4:55 a.m. dubbing it News 10 Good Morning going head-to-head with competitor KDRV's early morning newscast. The show switched up its format, differing from its competitors to include faster-paced headline style news with more morning weather hits than any other station in Southern Oregon and Northern California. The program also showcased the station's strong social media content, with the only station to have smart phone and iPad applications.

==== Cancellation of local newscasts ====
On April 27, 2023, it was reported that KTVL would be discontinuing its local newscasts, effective May 12, with plans to lay off the entire news operation. The station now runs The National Desk in lieu of locally produced newscasts. On June 30, 2023, the branding of KTVL was changed from News 10 to KTVL 10.

==== Notable former news staff ====
- Ann Curry (reporter/Telethon co-hostess)

=== Jerry Lewis MDA Telethon (1970–2010) / MDA Labor Day Telethon (2011) ===
KTVL was also the only southern Oregon and northern California television station that has continuously broadcast the Jerry Lewis MDA Telethon, benefiting the Muscular Dystrophy Association every Labor Day weekend from 1970 to 2011. (Fellow CBS affiliate KHSL-TV in Chico, California, was the next closest station to do so before broadcasting the program was ceased after 1997 by new ownership.) The local portion of the telethon was hosted by Marvin Rhodes, who was the main host for 35 years, and Donna Hildebrand, who was co-host for over 25 years, until they ended their tenure as main telethon hosts in 2005. Members of the News 10 team including Trish (Borucki) Glose, Kevin Lollis and Libby Dowsett had hosted the telethon at various times until the format was dissolved by MDA in 2012. It is believed to have been one of the most successful local telethon broadcasts in the country.

The most emotional moment came in 2002 when a devastated Rhodes announced that Grants Pass resident Ray Dimmick, who battled courageously against ALS (Lou Gehrig's Disease), had died in December 2001. Dimmick, accompanied by his wife Debra, appeared on the show every year for 10 years despite his condition deteriorating. A tribute video was broadcast in his memory.

With Jerry Lewis' retirement as host of the national telethon and its move from 21 1/2 hours to six hours in 2011, KTVL did air the telethon as usual. On February 10, 2012, MDA announced that the 2012 edition would be cut to three hours in length airing during prime time on Sunday, September 2, 2012. The 2012 edition, renamed the MDA Show of Strength (moving away from its heritage as a telethon), effectively ended KTVL's 41 years of telethon coverage. The special was since picked up by ABC for two years in 2013 and 2014 airing on KDRV, before being canceled altogether by MDA in early 2015.

=== After 10 ===
On June 3, 2006, KTVL launched a new locally produced late-night program for young adults called After 10, hosted by Curtis Bartlett and Lindsey Matherly, every Saturday night at 11:30 p.m. It was dubbed as the only locally produced show that delivers news and information on the local music scene, video games, movie releases (in theaters and on video), graphic novels, music videos, viral videos from the internet, and websites.

After 10 was KTVL's attempt to compete against NBC's Saturday Night Live by producing a program for its target audience themselves, instead on relying on syndication. After 10 was being retooled and was expected to be relaunched in the third quarter of 2007, but it never returned to the air.

After various syndicated programs and infomercials aired in the 11:30 p.m. slot, the slot became the home of the weekly Ring of Honor Wrestling show in April 2012 upon the acquisition of the station by Sinclair, which owned the RoH circuit until 2022 when the promotion was acquired by All Elite Wrestling.

== Technical information ==
=== Subchannels ===
The station's signal is multiplexed:

Subchannels of KTVL
Channel	Res.	Short name	Programming
10.1	1080i	NEWS10	CBS
10.2	720p	CW11	The CW Plus
10.3	480i	ROAR	Roar / Rip City Television Network
10.3	480i	Comet	Comet
10.5	480i	Charge!	Charge!
10.6	480i	TheNest	The Nest

On September 23, 2024, the Portland Trail Blazers announced an agreement with Sinclair to launch Rip City Television Network, which syndicates games over-the-air. Games in Medford air on KTVL's third (previously fourth) subchannel.

=== Analog-to-digital conversion ===
KTVL shut down its analog signal, over VHF channel 10, on June 12, 2009, the official date on which full-power television stations in the United States transitioned from analog to digital broadcasts under federal mandate. The station's digital signal relocated from its pre-transition UHF channel 35 to VHF channel 10 for post-transition operations.

=== Translators ===
- K15JZ-D Applegate Valley
- K14QH-D Butte Falls
- K21JI-D Cave Junction, etc.
- K18LJ-D Dunsmuir, etc., CA
- K06KA-D Fort Jones, etc., CA
- K22OQ-D Fort Jones, etc., CA
- K18LU-D Glendale, etc.
- K04JZ-D Gold Hill
- K25JW-D Hugo
- K15KL-D Jacksonville
- K15KE-D Klamath Falls, etc.
- K15HU-D Lakeview
- K19HH-D Midland, etc.
- K29LL-D Phoenix, Talent
- K07GI-D Prospect
- K28NO-D Rogue River
- K14TH-D Williams
- K30JS-D Yreka, CA

== See also ==
- Channel 10 digital TV stations in the United States
- Channel 10 virtual TV stations in the United States
- Channel 11 branded TV stations in the United States
