= KDRV =

Television station in Medford, Oregon

KDRV and KDKF

KDRV: Medford, Oregon; KDKF: Klamath Falls, Oregon; United States
- Channels for KDRV: Digital: 12 (VHF); Virtual: 12
- Channels for KDKF: Digital: 29 (UHF); Virtual: 31
- Branding: 12 ABC, NewsWatch 12

Programming
- Affiliations: 12.1/31.1: ABC; for others, see § Subchannels

Ownership
- Owner: Allen Media Group; (Oregon TV License Company LLC)

History
- Founded: KDRV: 1984
- First air date: KDRV: February 26, 1984; KDKF: October 27, 1989
- Former channel number: KDRV: Analog: 12 (VHF, 1984–2009); Digital: 38 (UHF, until 2009); KDKF: Analog: 31 (UHF, 1989–2009)
- Call sign meaning: KDRV: Rogue Valley; KDKF: KDRV Klamath Falls

Technical information
- Licensing authority: FCC
- Facility ID: KDRV: 60736; KDKF: 60740
- ERP: KDRV: 16.9 kW; KDKF: 4.87 kW
- HAAT: KDRV: 823 m (2,700 ft); KDKF: 651 m (2,136 ft)
- Transmitter coordinates: KDRV: 42°41′29.4″N 123°13′48.2″W; KDKF: 42°5′49.5″N 121°38′2.9″W
- Translator: see § Translators

Links
- Public license information: KDRV: Public file; LMS; KDKF: Public file; LMS
- Website: www.kdrv.com

KDRV (channel 12) in Medford, Oregon, and KDKF (channel 31) in Klamath Falls, Oregon, are television stations affiliated with ABC, serving southern Oregon and far northern California. Owned by Allen Media Group, the stations maintain studios on Knutson Avenue (near Rogue Valley International–Medford Airport) in north Medford. KDRV's transmitter is located at the edge of Wolf Creek Park in rural northeastern Josephine County (near Golden), while KDKF's tower sits atop Stukel Mountain southeast of Klamath Falls.

KDKF operates as a full-time satellite of KDRV; its existence is only acknowledged in station identifications. Aside from its transmitter, KDKF does not maintain any physical presence locally in Klamath Falls.

== History ==
KDRV NewsWatch 12 logo, used from 2004 to 2011.

Prior to 1984, KOBI (channel 5) served as the primary ABC affiliate for southern Oregon and extreme northern California, but Medford was only partially covered. Viewers in some areas of southern Oregon could also receive KATU from Portland on cable. By this time, the Medford–Klamath Falls–Yreka market was one of the few markets in the country without full network service. This was partly because the channel 8 construction permit, for KSYS, had been transferred to a nonprofit that intended to use it for a PBS station. When the FCC changed channel 8's status to reserved noncommercial in late 1977, it allocated channel 12 to Medford "to provide a third VHF network service". The FCC did so on its own initiative, without anyone requesting the allocation. Reportedly, the FCC wanted to ensure that the market would receive full service from all three major networks. Southern Oregon is very mountainous, and UHF stations have never covered large areas or rugged terrain very well, even in digital.

The first group to apply for channel 12 was Rogue River–based Christian Broadcasting Corporation, which intended to make it a religious station. In 1979, Sunshine Television, a consortium of local investors headed by Dunbar Carpenter and Ronald Dunbar, applied for the channel, intending to make it an ABC affiliate. They were ultimately joined by Highland Communications and Channel 12 Limited Partnership. The parties entered into a settlement agreement in September 1982 that granted Sunshine the construction permit.

KDRV signed on the air for the first time on February 26, 1984, having missed a deadline to sign on in time to air the 1984 Winter Olympics. The station's studio on Knutson Drive in Medford had not yet been finished, and live local programming was not possible from the temporary studio built nearby. The permanent studio was finished later in 1984, and the station was able to begin news and other local programming a year later. Sunshine sold the station to Love Broadcasting in 1987. The new owners signed on KDKF as a Klamath Falls satellite on October 17, 1989. Chambers Communications of Eugene bought the station in 1994. This made KDRV a sister station to fellow ABC affiliate KEZI in Eugene.

Until 2007, KDRV was one of the few television stations still using the U-Matic videotape format for editing and on-air playback.

On March 5, 2014, Chambers Communications announced that it would exit broadcasting and sell its stations to Heartland Media, a company owned by former Gray Television executive Bob Prather. The sale was completed on July 15. Heartland recently added CBS affiliate KHSL-TV in Chico, California, to its family of stations.

On June 1, 2025, amid financial woes and rising debt, Allen Media Group announced that it would explore "strategic options" for the company, such as a sale of its television stations (including KDRV/KDKF).

== News operation ==
KDRV presently broadcasts 36 hours of locally produced newscasts each week (with six hours each weekday and three hours each on Saturdays and Sundays).

Launched on September 16, 1985, KDRV has a fully staffed news department known as NewsWatch 12. By the mid-1990s, it had shot to first place in the Medford–Klamath Falls market, and has stayed at the top for most of the last two decades. Like fellow station KOBI, they air newscasts at 5 p.m., 6 p.m., and 11 p.m.; but beginning in 2013, weekend newscasts began airing at 8 a.m., 5, 6, 6:30, and 11 p.m., unlike its rivals. KDRV airs its morning news starting at 5 a.m. Anchor and reporter Ron Brown (known as the "Dean of News Anchors" in Southern Oregon) and chief meteorologist Scott Lewis were the longest-tenured newscasters in the station's history, but Lewis retired in 2012 and Brown retired in May 2015. Anchor Brian Morton (who joined the station in 1995) succeeded Brown as KDRV's longest-tenured anchor. Brown hosted the weekly "Oregon Trails" segment, which took a look back at Southern Oregon's history, while Morton reports on "Wednesday's Child", an adoption segment. The newscast has received numerous awards, including several National Association of Broadcasters, Associated Press, and Emmy awards. For a short period of time, KDRV was the only station in the Medford market to continue airing local sportscasts while rival stations KTVL and KOBI dropped their sportscasts in 2009. This has since changed.

On January 5, 2011, NewsWatch 12 was the first in the market to begin broadcasting its newscasts in 16:9 widescreen, to coincide with its new look, which is similar to sister station KEZI in Eugene. The station was also the first in the market to broadcast commercials in high definition. On September 9, 2013, KDRV added yet another newscast to its daily schedule, known as NewsWatch 12 Midday, which airs weekdays at 11 a.m. In 2025, the midday newscasts on KDRV and sister station KEZI were consolidated into Oregon News Now at Midday.

On January 17, 2025, Allen Media Group announced plans to cut local meteorologist/weather forecaster positions from its stations, including KDRV/KEZI, and replace them with a "weather hub" produced by The Weather Channel, which AMG also owns. The decision was reversed within a week by management, in response to "viewer and advertiser reaction".

=== Notable former on-air staff ===
- Walt Maciborski – news anchor

== Technical information ==
=== Subchannels ===
The stations' signals are multiplexed:

Subchanels of KDRV and KDKF
Channel		Res.	Short name		Programming
KDRV	KDKF	Res.	KDRV	KDKF	Programming
12.1	31.1	720p	KDRV-HD	KDKF-HD	ABC
12.2	31.2	480i	KDRV-SD	KDKF-SD	Antenna TV
12.3	31.3	480i	KDRVDT3	KDKFDT3	True Crime Network
12.4	31.4	480i	KDRVDT4	KDKFDT4	Catchy Comedy
12.5	31.5	480i	KDRVDT5	KDKFDT5	Start TV

=== Analog-to-digital conversion ===
Both stations shut down their analog signals on February 17, 2009, the original target date by which full-power television stations in the United States were to transition from analog to digital broadcasts under federal mandate (which was later pushed back to June 12, 2009). The station's digital channel allocations post-transition are as follows:

- KDRV shut down its analog signal, over VHF channel 12; the station's digital signal relocated from its pre-transition UHF channel 38 to VHF channel 12 for post-transition operations.
- KDKF shut down its analog signal, over UHF channel 31; the station's digital signal remained on its pre-transition UHF channel 29, using virtual channel 31.

=== Translators ===
KDRV is rebroadcast on the following digital translator stations:

- K29NI-D Cave Junction
- K15KJ-D Gold Hill
- K15BP-D Grants Pass
- K21BG-D Jacksonville
- K15BP-D Fort Dick, CA
- K21LW-D Gazelle, CA
- K17BA-D Yreka, CA

== Carriage disputes ==
=== Dispute with Dish Network ===
On December 10, 2010, KDRV announced on its newscast that its owner, Chambers Communications, and Dish Network could not come to a long-term agreement to keep the station on the air in the Medford market and were in danger of losing local ABC programming as a result. Viewers were encouraged to read a special Q&A page regarding this matter. Despite their best efforts, their previous agreement expired on December 15 and the stations were removed from the Dish Network local line-ups. Chambers and Dish finally came to an agreement to resume service, and on December 30, 2010, the stations returned to Dish Network.

=== KDRV replaces KRCR on Mt. Shasta cable ===
In January 2012, KDRV replaced Redding, California, ABC affiliate KRCR-TV on Northland Communications (now Vyve Broadband) cable channel 7 in Mt. Shasta, California, as Northland and KRCR severed ties after failing to come to a mutual agreement to continue on the Mt. Shasta cable system. Thus, Northland placed KDRV in the channel 7 slot.

Despite being in California, Siskiyou County is part of the Medford DMA, according to the FCC. Both KRCR and Northland made several attempts to get the DMA changed, but were unsuccessful each time. KHSL-TV, KNVN-TV, and KIXE-TV are the only Chico–Redding market stations airing on the Northland system in Mt. Shasta; however, certain programs on KHSL and KNVN are subject to blackout due to the FCC's network non-duplication and syndication exclusivity rules.

KDRV had been on Northland's Yreka cable system on channel 12 since the station launched in early 1984 and the advent of local cable television back in the early to mid 1980s.
