= KMTR =

Television station in Eugene, Oregon

- Eugene, Oregon; United States
- Channels: Digital: 17 (UHF); Virtual: 16
- Branding: NBC 16; Western Oregon CW 11 (16.2)

Programming
- Affiliations: 16.1: NBC; 16.2: CW+; 16.3: Comet

Ownership
- Owner: Sinclair Broadcast Group; (Sinclair Eugene Licensee, LLC)
- Sister stations: KVAL-TV

History
- First air date: October 4, 1982
- Former call signs: KMTR-TV (1982–1990)
- Former channel numbers: Analog: 16 (UHF, 1982–2009)

Technical information
- Licensing authority: FCC
- Facility ID: 35189
- ERP: 300 kW
- HAAT: 398 m (1,306 ft)
- Transmitter coordinates: 44°0′6″N 123°6′57″W
- Translator(s): see § Rebroadcasters

Links
- Public license information: Public file; LMS
- Website: nbc16.com

KMTR (channel 16) is a television station in Eugene, Oregon, United States, affiliated with NBC and The CW Plus. It is owned by Sinclair Broadcast Group alongside CBS affiliate KVAL-TV (channel 13). The two stations share studios on Blanton Road in Eugene, where KMTR's transmitter is also located. KMTR maintained separate facilities on International Court in Springfield, Oregon, until 2020 when the station relocated to KVAL's building; master control and some internal operations for KMTR were based at the KVAL studios.

KMTR reaches additional viewers in west-central Oregon via co-owned full-power satellite stations KMCB (channel 23) in Coos Bay and KTCW (channel 46) in Roseburg.

== History ==
The station began broadcasting on October 4, 1982. Before then, Eugene had been one of the last markets in the country without full network service. KVAL-TV (channel 13) had been an affiliate of NBC and CBS, while KEZI (channel 9) had been a primary ABC affiliate with a secondary CBS affiliation. With KMTR entering the market, KVAL chose CBS, which at the time was performing better in the ratings. The Columbia Empire Broadcasting Corporation of Yakima, Washington, acquired the station in 1984.

In late 1995, the station was bought by the Wicks Broadcast Group of New York City.

In September 1998, an agreement between KMTR, The WB 100+ Station Group and the area's cable provider allowed the station to launch cable-only WB affiliate "KZWB". Since it was a cable-exclusive outlet, the call sign was not officially recognized by the Federal Communications Commission (FCC). KMTR provided sales and promotional opportunities to the cable channel.

In March 1999, Wicks sold KMTR to the Ackerley Group, who merged with Clear Channel Communications (now iHeartMedia) in 2001. KMTR was named "Station of the Year" for 2005 by the Oregon Association of Broadcasters (OAB).

In February 2006, the two satellite stations, KMTZ and KMTX, changed their call letters to KUCW and KTCW, respectively. In May 2006, KMTR signed a long term affiliation agreement with The CW, a replacement network for The WB. In September 2006, KMTR added The CW on a digital subchannel, replacing the cable-only KZWB.

On April 20, 2007, Clear Channel announced it would exit television and sell its entire television division to Newport Television, a unit of Providence Equity Partners. The deal closed on March 14, 2008.

KMTR shut down its analog signal, over UHF channel 16, on February 17, 2009, the original target date on which full-power television stations in the United States were to transition from analog to digital broadcasts under federal mandate (which was later pushed back to June 12, 2009). The station's digital signal remained on its pre-transition UHF channel 17, using virtual channel 16.

In 2012, Newport Television entered into agreements to sell most of its stations to the Nexstar Broadcasting Group, Sinclair Broadcast Group, Cox Media Group and Shield Media, LLC. It would not be until November 26, 2012, when Newport announced a sale to Fisher Communications. Because Fisher already owned KVAL-TV, Fisher assigned the rights to acquire the FCC license to KMTR Television, LLC, which is wholly owned by Roberts Media, LLC. Roberts Media is wholly owned by veteran broadcaster Larry Roberts. KMTR Television then entered into a shared services agreement (SSA) with Fisher. WHAM-TV in Rochester, New York, was the last remaining station to be owned by Newport Television as of November 2012 that had not yet been sold, until December 3 when it was announced that Sinclair would acquire the non-license assets of WHAM. While still awaiting FCC approval of the sale to KMTR Television, LLC, on April 11, 2013, Fisher announced that it would sell its properties, including KVAL and the planned SSA with KMTR, to Sinclair.

The FCC granted its approval of KMTR to KMTR Television, LLC, on April 24 and the sale was consummated June 3, 2013. On February 19, KMTR was the sole Newport Television property, until June 1 when it was the last station to have its sale completed. After the completion of the sale, certain operations and personnel changes were made. The sale of the Fisher stations to Sinclair was completed on August 8, 2013.

In 2016, KMTR remained the only "Big Four" network-affiliated station in Western Oregon to produce its local newscasts in pillarboxed 4:3 standard definition until finally switching to 16:9 on October 22.

Beginning in 2019, KMTR began moving out of its original building in Springfield. As of summer 2020, KMTR's studios and master control room are in the same facility as KVAL, and KMTR has upgraded its newscasts and syndicated programming to HD.

By the end of 2019, CW Eugene has been airing in 720p high definition over KMTR and KMCB (and all their associated repeater signals); however, KTCW (and its associated repeater signals) continued to air the subchannel in 4:3 standard definition, until it was upgraded by the end of March 2020.

On July 28, 2021, the FCC issued a Forfeiture Order stemming from a lawsuit against KMTR owner Roberts Media. The lawsuit, filed by AT&T, alleged that Roberts failed to negotiate for retransmission consent in good faith for KMTR. Owners of other Sinclair-managed stations, such as Deerfield Media, were also named in the lawsuit. Roberts was ordered to pay a fine of $512,228.

KMTR served as the host station for the 2022 World Athletics Championships which were held at the University of Oregon's Hayward Field. It was the only station on the West Coast where weekend prime time coverage of the meet was carried live; all other West Coast markets aired coverage on tape delay, though the event was carried live across the country on Peacock.

On August 12, 2025, Sinclair announced that it would acquire full ownership of KMTR and its satellites for an undisclosed price, creating a legal duopoly with KVAL. Sinclair used a failing station waiver to facilitate the transaction. The sale was completed on February 10, 2026.

== Technical information and subchannels ==
The stations' signals are multiplexed:

Subchannels of KMTR, KMCB, and KTCW
Channel			Res.	Short name			Programming
KMTR	KMCB	KTCW	Res.	KMTR	KMCB	KTCW	Programming
16.1	23.1	46.1	1080i	NBC16	NBC 23	KTCW	NBC
16.2	23.2	46.2	720p	CW Plus		KTCW-CW	The CW Plus
16.3	23.3	46.3	480i	Comet		CometTV	Comet

=== Rebroadcasters ===
==== Satellite stations ====
Satellites of KMTR
Station	City of license (Note: Aside from their transmitters, KMCB and KTCW do not maintain any physical presence in their respective cities of license.)	Channels RF / VC	First air date	Former callsigns	ERP	HAAT	Facility ID	Transmitter coordinates	Transmitter location	Public license information
KMCB	Coos Bay	22 (UHF); 23	July 8, 1991	KVPP (1990–1991); KMTZ (1991–2006); KUCW (2006)	10 kW	179 m (587 ft)	35183	43°23′38.4″N 124°8′0.3″W	atop Noah Butte	Public file LMS
KTCW	Roseburg	36 (UHF); 46	April 1992 (Note: The Broadcasting and Cable Yearbook says KTCW signed on April 8, while the Television and Cable Factbook says it signed on April 20.)	KMTX-TV (1992–2006)	38.9 kW	109 m (358 ft)	35187	43°12′21.5″N 123°21′53.9″W	atop Mount Nebo	Public file LMS

==== Translators ====
- K15KF-D Coos Bay (translates KMCB)
- K36NL-D Cottage Grove (translates KMTR)
- K26NE-D Florence (translates KMTR)
- K35JH-D London Springs (translates KMTR)
- K28OD-D Powers (translates KMCB)
- K31AE-D Sutherlin (translates KMTR)
- K22GX-D Tri City (translates KTCW)
