= Camas Valley, Oregon =

Unincorporated community in the state of Oregon, United States

- Unincorporated community
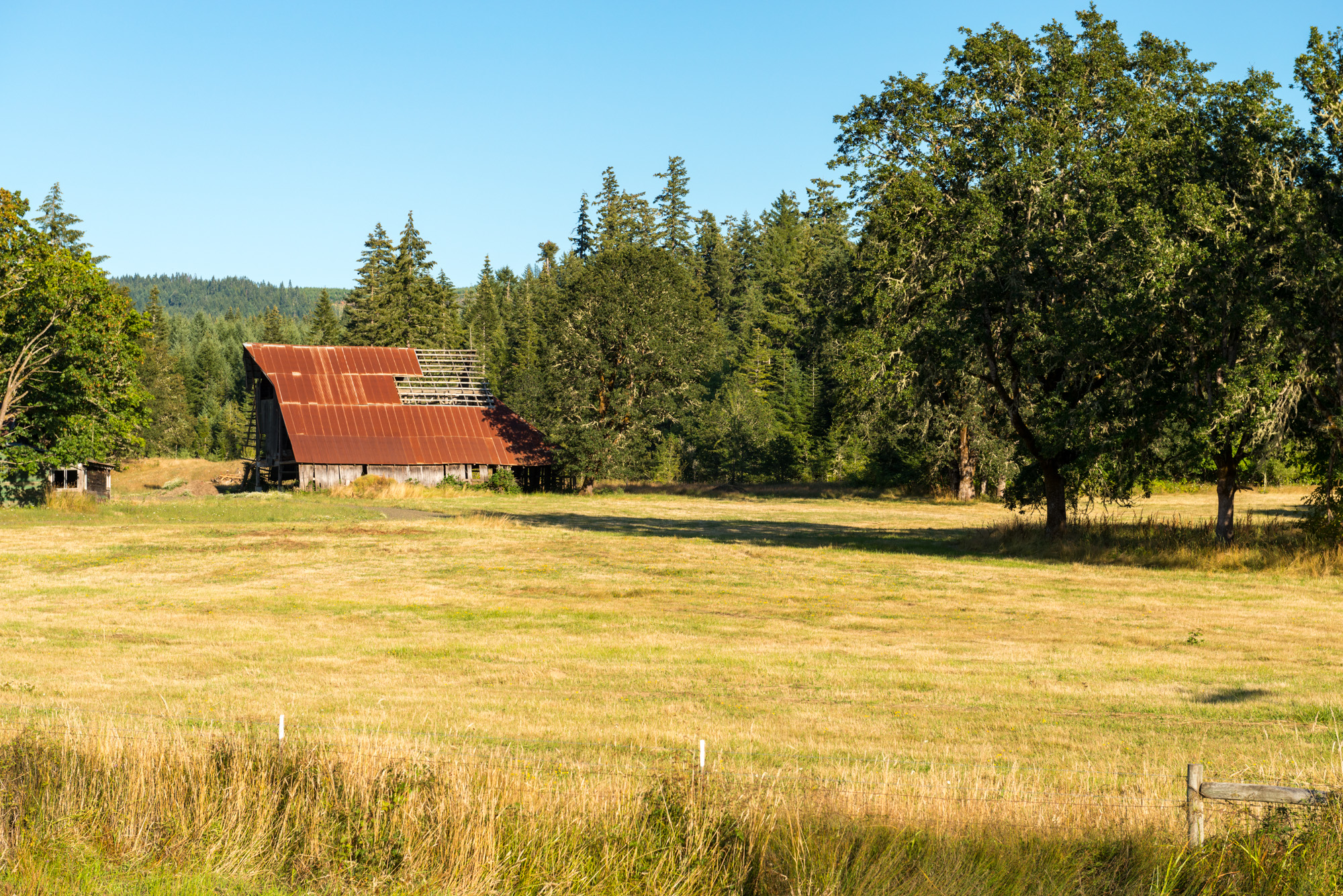
- A barn along Highway 42 in Camas Valley

- Location within Oregon Location within the United States
- Coordinates: 43°02′03″N 123°40′26″W
- Country: United States
- State: Oregon
- County: Douglas
- Elevation: 1,135 ft (346 m)
- Time zone: UTC-8 (Pacific (PST))
  - Summer (DST): UTC-7 (PDT)
- ZIP code: 97416
- GNIS feature ID: 1118484

Camas Valley is an unincorporated community in Douglas County, Oregon, United States, in the valley of the same name. It is on Oregon Route 42, near the Middle Fork Coquille River.

The name of the valley and the community come from the abundance of Camassia growing in the area; it was an important food source for the local Native Americans. Camas Valley post office was established in July 1870.
