= Cedar Valley (Oregon) =

Valley in Curry County, Oregon, United States

Coordinates: 42.520942°N 124.362046°W

Cedar Valley (formerly Squaw Valley) is a valley in the Siskiyou Mountains of Curry County, Oregon, United States, northeast of Gold Beach. The valley runs north from near the headwaters of Rumley Creek (a tributary of the Rogue River) along the course of Cedar Creek from its headwaters to its confluence with Miller Creek, about four miles south of Ophir. The area is served by a volunteer fire department, which is known for its annual fundraising fish fry.

== Name change ==
By 2001, the word "squaw" was considered derogatory and a Senate joint memorial was passed by the Oregon State Legislature directing the Oregon Geographic Names Board to rename approximately 140-150 geographic features in Oregon containing the word.

In 2001 and again in 2005, state legislation was passed preventing public bodies from using the word "squaw" in the names of public properties, with some exceptions. In 2001, the deadline for the name changes was set as January 2, 2005, but the deadline was repealed in 2005.

On January 1, 2005, Squaw Valley Road, which runs from the Rogue River along the valley to near Ophir, was renamed by the Curry County Commissioners to Cedar Valley Road. The Cedar Valley Fire Department was recorded by the United States Geological Survey (USGS) as having changed its name from Squaw Valley Fire Department in 2010.

On September 8, 2022 the USGS published an edit renaming the valley to Cedar Valley.
