= Midland, Oregon =

Unincorporated community in the state of Oregon, United States

- Unincorporated community
- Location within Oregon and the United States Midland (the United States)
- Coordinates: 42°07′51″N 121°49′13″W
- Country: United States
- State: Oregon
- County: Klamath
- Elevation: 4,098 ft (1,249 m)
- Time zone: UTC-8 (Pacific (PST))
  - Summer (DST): UTC-7 (PDT)
- ZIP codes: 97634
- GNIS feature ID: 1136536

Midland is an unincorporated community in Klamath County, Oregon, United States. The community is located approximately 8 miles (13 km) south of Klamath Falls on U.S. Route 97.

== History ==
The site was platted in 1908, and named Midland, with a post office established in 1909. At the time, it was said the name was chosen because the town was halfway between Portland and San Francisco on the proposed Cascade Line of the Southern Pacific Railroad. It is not halfway, however, and it is now thought that the name refers to the town's site on land partly surrounded by marshes.

When the Cascade Line reached Midland, the community served as a depot and shipping point for cattle and other livestock, and it once had two general stores, a hotel with a saloon, a livery stable, a warehouse for grain and a telephone office. Little remains in Midland today, but Klamath County's visitor center is located there.

== Climate ==
This region experiences warm (but not hot) and dry summers, with no average monthly temperatures above 71.6 °F (22.0 °C). According to the Köppen Climate Classification system, Midland has a warm-summer Mediterranean climate, abbreviated "Csb" on climate maps.

== Notable residents ==
- Carl Barks, Disney Studios illustrator
