= KEZI =

Television station in Eugene, Oregon

- Eugene, Oregon; United States
- Channels: Digital: 9 (VHF); Virtual: 9
- Branding: KEZI 9; KEZI 9 News

Programming
- Affiliations: 9.1: ABC; for others, see § Subchannels

Ownership
- Owner: Allen Media Group; (Oregon TV License Company, LLC)

History
- First air date: December 19, 1960
- Former call signs: KEZI-TV (1960–1986)
- Former channel numbers: Analog: 9 (VHF, 1960–2009); Digital: 44 (UHF, 2000–2009)
- Former affiliations: CBS (secondary, 1960–1982)
- Call sign meaning: "EZ on the I" (Former slogan: "Easy on the eye")

Technical information
- Licensing authority: FCC
- Facility ID: 34406
- ERP: 21.6 kW
- HAAT: 738 m (2,421 ft)
- Transmitter coordinates: 44°17′27.4″N 123°32′22.3″W
- Translator(s): see § Translators

Links
- Public license information: Public file; LMS
- Website: www.kezi.com

KEZI (channel 9) is a television station in Eugene, Oregon, United States, affiliated with ABC and owned by Allen Media Group. The station's studios are located on Chad Drive in Eugene, and its transmitter is located on East Prairie Mountain near Horton, Oregon.

== History ==
KEZI logo, 2008–2010

Channel 9 was originally assigned to Eugene for noncommercial use along with one commercial channel on the very high frequency (VHF) band, 13 (occupied by KVAL-TV beginning in 1954), and two UHF frequencies. However, by 1957, interest emerged in changing the classification of channel 9 for Eugene to commercial. A group of Eugene investors organized as Liberty Television—including president Donald A. McDonald—applied to the Federal Communications Commission (FCC) for redesignation of the channel. While educational interests fought the redesignation attempt, the Eugene city council approved by majority vote a resolution urging the addition of a second commercial station for Eugene to increase the number of national network programs broadcast to the city as well as the advertising inventory available to local businesses. Liberty also noted the fact that a second commercial station would give Eugene viewers a choice and extend TV service to new areas.

After Liberty successfully convinced the FCC to change channel 9 to commercial use, it then applied for a construction permit to build a station on the channel in December 1957. Springfield radio station KEED also filed for the station, leading to the beginning of a comparative hearing between the applicants in December 1958. However, KEED struggled with an issue that had affected the radio station: the sale of commercials longer than one minute in duration, a discouraged practice. FCC hearing examiner Thomas Donohue recommended Liberty Television over KEED in September 1959, citing Liberty's superior proposed programming and docking KEED over the commercial issue. The full commission followed the examiner's recommendation and awarded channel 9 to Liberty Television in March 1960.

The construction permit was not awarded until July. Liberty began construction and considered which network it wanted to take for an affiliation. KVAL-TV was then a primary NBC affiliate, so the choice was between CBS and ABC; at the end of August, it was announced that the station would be an ABC affiliate. After delays prompted by a strike at General Electric, KEZI first went on the air at 6:30 p.m. on December 19, 1960. Its original studios and offices were located at 2225 Coburg Road, with the transmitter being sited in the Coburg Hills just to the northeast of the city.

Although a primary ABC affiliate, KEZI also broadcast select CBS programming in off-hours; Eugene viewers had been able to watch the full CBS lineup since the mid-1950s, when cable operators piped in Portland CBS affiliate KOIN-TV. Channel 9 also aired CBS' NFL regular-season games live from 1965 until the mid-1970s.

In October 1982, KMTR (channel 16) began broadcasting in Eugene, carrying the full NBC programming schedule. This resulted in KEZI choosing to become a full-time ABC affiliate and making KVAL the primary CBS affiliate.

Liberty grew during its first 24 years, becoming one of the nation's largest cable-system operators. In 1983, Tele-Communications Inc. purchased Liberty's cable and television assets. Carolyn Chambers formed Chambers Communications and purchased several former Liberty entities, including KEZI. Chambers Communications then bought Medford ABC affiliate KDRV and KDKF, its satellite in Klamath Falls.

On February 14, 1998, KEZI moved from its Coburg Road location to the recently completed Chambers Media Center (CMC). The 100,000-square-foot (9,300 m^{2}) complex was home to most Chambers Communications projects. It housed five sound stages, making it one of the largest such facilities on the West Coast at the time. Chambers Productions's two films, Puerto Vallarta Squeeze and The Sisters, were shot at the CMC and elsewhere in Eugene.

In September 2006, Chambers Communications established KOHD in Bend, Oregon. Broadcasting on channel 51, KOHD was an ABC affiliate and sister station to KEZI. As it never broadcast in analog, KOHD was the first primary digital station to carry a major network affiliation. KOHD was sold to the Zolo Media division of BendBroadband in 2013.

Chambers Communications announced on March 5, 2014, that it would leave broadcasting and sell its stations to Heartland Media, a company owned by former Gray Television executive Bob Prather. The sale was completed on July 15. On October 1, 2019, Allen Media Group agreed to purchase 11 Heartland stations, including KEZI, for $290 million. The sale was approved by the FCC on November 22, 2019, and it was completed on February 11, 2020.

On June 1, 2025, amid financial woes and rising debt, Allen Media Group announced that it would explore "strategic options" for the company, such as a sale of its television stations (including KEZI).

=== Dish Network dispute ===
KEZI announced on December 10, 2010, that Chambers Communications could not reach an agreement to keep its stations on Dish Network's local feeds, leaving viewers in those areas in danger of losing local ABC programming. Their agreement expired on December 15, and the stations were removed from the local Dish Network lineup. Chambers and Dish reached an agreement to resume service, and the stations returned to Dish Network on December 30.

== Programming ==
KEZI's broadcast schedule is dominated by news, local features and ABC network programming. Sports is also a significant part of KEZI programming, with Oregon Ducks football and basketball and ABC's extensive sports coverage. The station has aired reruns of Star Trek, Star Trek: Deep Space Nine and Taxi. KEZI pioneered high-definition television (HDTV) programming in the Eugene market by airing a locally originated Oregon Ducks football game in late 2005, coordinating the broadcast with the Oregon Sports Network and ESPN Plus.

=== Digital subchannels ===
KEZI introduced a 24-hour local-news service, KEZI 9+ Nonstop News, on over-the-air digital channel 9.2 in January 2011. It broadcasts local news and a three-hour block of children's programming to comply with FCC requirements for educational programs. That autumn, 9+ began airing the Friday Night Blitz Game of the Week, local live telecasts of high-school football. This was followed by the Roundball Wrap Game of the Week, local live telecasts of high-school basketball, during the winter of 2012. Both programs are similar to those broadcast by sister station KDRV NewsWatch 12+.

On September 9, 2013, KEZI 9.2 replaced KEZI 9+ with Live Well Network Western Oregon. Live Well Network is a home, health and lifestyle high-definition digital subchannel network owned by Disney-ABC Television Group and operated by the ABC Owned Television Stations. KEZI stopped carrying the subchannel on October 31, 2014.

KEZI 9.2 began airing MeTV, which carries shows from the 1950s through the 1980s, the following day. MeTV Western Oregon is broadcast over the air on channel 9.2, on Charter channel 186, Comcast channel 309 and on Country Vision Cable 24. KEZI continues to carry the Friday Night Blitz and Roundball Wrap Game of the Week on channel 9.2.

== News department ==
The station's news department serves most of southwestern Oregon. KEZI's sister stations, KDRV and KDKF, share news and video with the station. The news department also has bureaus in Corvallis, Roseburg and Coos Bay. KEZI relies on ABC NewsOne and CNN for national stories, and carries Portland-area stories from KATU and KGW. Although KEZI was the longtime flagship of the Oregon Sports Network (the TV network for University of Oregon football, basketball and other sports), Chambers Communications terminated its relationship with the OSN in 2008.

In March 2010, newscasts began originating from a temporary set in the newsroom while a new set was constructed and other upgrades were made to prepare for HD. Chambers Communications' cancellation of long-form newscasts at KOHD, KEZI's sister station in Bend, facilitated the upgrade. On April 26 of that year, KEZI became the first Eugene station to broadcast local news in high definition; newscasts on KVAL, KMTR, and KLSR-TV remained in 16:9 enhanced definition widescreen until 2020. In 2025, the station's midday newscast was consolidated with sister station KDRV to form a new newscast title called Oregon News Now at Midday.

On January 17, 2025, Allen Media Group announced plans to cut local meteorologist/weather forecaster positions from its stations, including KEZI/KDRV, and replacing them with a "weather hub" produced by The Weather Channel, which AMG also owns. The decision was reversed within a week by management in response to "viewer and advertiser reaction".

=== Awards and former staff ===
Former evening-news anchor Rick Dancer (who spent 16 years at KEZI) and Al Peterson were highlighted in the Oregon Associated Press Best Feature category for Division II in 2005. KEZI received several Oregon Associated Press awards in 2010, including one for overall excellence. Lisa Verch Fletcher was the evening news anchor until 2002. Ron Magers later spent over 45 years with stations in Minneapolis–Saint Paul and Chicago before his retirement on May 25, 2016.

== Technical information ==
=== Subchannels ===
The station's signal is multiplexed:

Subchannels of KEZI
Channel	Res.	Short name	Programming
9.1	720p	KEZI-HD	ABC
9.2	480i	KEZI-Me	MeTV
9.3	480i	ION-TV	Ion
9.4	480i	H&I	Heroes & Icons
9.5	480i	StartTV	Start TV
9.6	480i	MeToons	MeTV Toons

=== Analog-to-digital conversion ===
KEZI shut down its analog VHF channel 9 signal on February 17, 2009, the original date on which full-power television stations in the United States were to change from analog to digital broadcasts by federal mandate; the deadline was later pushed back to June 12. The station's digital signal moved from UHF channel 44 to VHF channel 9.

=== Translators ===
- K23ME-D Camas Valley
- K27CL-D Coos Bay/North Bend
- K24LY-D Cottage Grove
- KEZI (DRT) Elkton
- K11GT-D Eugene
- K35HW-D Florence
- K31PI-D London Springs
- K25NI-D Mapleton
- KEZI (DRT) Oakridge
- K34KL-D Powers
- K04OS-D Reedsport
- K22MB-D Roseburg
- K15JG-D Scottsburg
- K11BX-D Sutherlin

Low-power translators in Black Butte Ranch, Myrtle Point, Newport, and Oakland were decommissioned.

== See also ==
- KDRV
