= KSLM-LD =

- Dallas–Salem–Portland, Oregon; United States
- City: Dallas, Oregon
- Channels: Digital: 27 (UHF); Virtual: 27
- Branding: theDove

Programming
- Affiliations: 3.1: QVC; 17.1: YTA TV; 27.1: theDove; 37.1: Estrella TV

Ownership
- Owner: Northwest Television, LLC; (Michael Mattson)

History
- First air date: September 2008
- Former call signs: K16HT-D
- Former channel numbers: Digital: 16 (UHF, 2008–2010)
- Call sign meaning: Salem

Technical information
- Licensing authority: FCC
- Facility ID: 129164
- Class: LD
- ERP: 15 kW
- HAAT: 269.8 m (885 ft)
- Transmitter coordinates: 44°58′37.4″N 123°8′33.3″W

Links
- Public license information: LMS

KSLM-LD (channel 27) is a low-power television station licensed to Dallas, Oregon, United States, serving the Willamette Valley, within the Portland, Oregon, television market. The station is owned by Northwest Television, LLC. KSLM-LD's transmitter is located in the Eagle Crest area in the West Salem hills in Polk County.

== History ==
The station began operation in September 2008, as a digital translator for KWVT-LP. In April 2009, KSLM signed an affiliation agreement with Retro TV. The KWVT programming remains available as a digital subchannel.

The change in channel was prompted by interference from another station operating on channel 16, KORS-CA. At the time KSLM began operation, KORS was licensed on channel 36. KORS was subsequently granted a construction permit to operate on channel 16 from a tower in Portland.

== Subchannels ==
The station's signal is multiplexed:

Subchannels of KSLM-LD, KWVT-LD, KPWC-LD, and KVDO-LD
Channel	Res.	Short name	Programming
3.1	480i	KVDO	QVC
17.1	720p	KWVT	YTA TV
27.1	480i	KSLM	theDove
37.1	720p	Azteca	Estrella TV

== Translators ==
City of license	Callsign	Channel	ERP	HAAT	Facility ID	Transmitter coordinates
Albany	KVDO-LD	34	2.5 kW	311 m (1,020 ft)	130048	44°30′19″N 122°57′42″W
Salem	KWVT-LD	11	3 kW	355 m (1,165 ft)	129197	45°31′22″N 122°45′11″W
Tillamook	KPWC-LD	6	3 kW	263 m (863 ft)	130052	44°58′37.4″N 123°8′33.3″W
