= KOBI (TV) =

Television station in Medford, Oregon

KOBI and KOTI

KOBI: Medford, Oregon; KOTI: Klamath Falls, Oregon; United States
- Channels for KOBI: Digital: 5 (VHF); Virtual: 5
- Channels for KOTI: Digital: 13 (VHF); Virtual: 2
- Branding: KOBI: NBC 5; KOTI: NBC 2

Programming
- Affiliations: 5.1/2.1: NBC; for others, see § Subchannels

Ownership
- Owner: California Oregon Broadcasting, Inc. (Smullin family)

History
- First air date: KOBI: August 1, 1953; KOTI: August 13, 1956
- Former call signs: KOBI: KBES-TV (1953–1964); KTVM (1964–1968)
- Former channel number: KOBI: Analog: 5 (VHF, 1953–2009); Digital: 15 (UHF, until 2009); KOTI: Analog: 2 (VHF, 1956–2009)
- Former affiliations: KOBI: CBS (primary 1953–1978, secondary 1978–1983); DuMont (secondary, 1953–1955); NBC (secondary, 1953–1961); ABC (secondary 1953–1978 and 1983–1984, primary 1978–1983); KOTI: NBC (primary 1956–1961, secondary 1961–1984); ABC (secondary 1956–1961, primary 1961–1984); CBS (secondary, 1956–1984)
- Call sign meaning: KOBI: K(C)alifornia (sic) Oregon Broadcasting, Inc.; KOTI: Oregon Technical Institute or disambiguation of KOBI

Technical information
- Licensing authority: FCC
- Facility ID: KOBI: 8260; KOTI: 8284
- ERP: KOBI: 6.35 kW; KOTI: 9 kW
- HAAT: KOBI: 823 m (2,700 ft); KOTI: 659 m (2,162 ft)
- Transmitter coordinates: KOBI: 42°41′49.5″N 123°13′45.1″W; KOTI: 42°5′48″N 121°38′1″W
- Translator: see § Translators

Links
- Public license information: KOBI: Public file; LMS; KOTI: Public file; LMS
- Website: kobi5.com

KOBI (channel 5) in Medford, Oregon, and KOTI (channel 2) in Klamath Falls, Oregon, are television stations affiliated with NBC, serving southern Oregon and far northern California. The stations serve as the flagship properties of locally based California Oregon Broadcasting, Inc., and maintain studios on South Fir Street in downtown Medford, with a news bureau on South 7th Street in downtown Klamath Falls. KOBI's transmitter is located atop Kings Mountain, 28 miles (45 km) northwest of Medford, while KOTI's tower sits atop Stukel Mountain southeast of Klamath Falls.

KOTI operates as a full-time satellite of KOBI; its existence is only acknowledged in station identifications. Together, the two stations serve 12 mostly rural counties in southern Oregon and northern California.

== History ==
KOBI was founded on August 1, 1953, by Bill Smullin, a 20-year veteran of the television industry. Its call letters were originally KBES-TV ("Best TV"), and it carried programming from all four major networks. However, for its first 25 years, it was primarily a CBS affiliate.

Smullin soon realized that KBES' signal was not strong enough to cover all of southern Oregon, which the FCC had ruled was part of the Medford market, so he bought the license for channel 2 in Klamath Falls, and KOTI debuted on August 13, 1956. Its call letters KOTI are believed to have come from the city's local four-year college, the Oregon Institute of Technology (formerly Oregon Technical Institute). Originally, KOTI carried all three networks.

On September 21, 1964, Smullin changed the call letters to KTVM. When channel 10 was allocated to Medford, Smullin helped the owners of KMED get the license, as well as space on his transmitter on Blackwell Hill. Partly because of his help, KMED-TV (channel 10, now KTVL) signed on in 1961. In 1968, KTVM moved to a powerful transmitter on King Mountain and changed its calls to the current KOBI.

By 1978, KOBI had become a primary ABC affiliate, which by then had become the top network. However, they continued to carry some CBS programs (such as the CBS Evening News and several daytime shows). In 1983, KOBI picked up NBC from KTVL, which switched to CBS. It carried a few ABC programs for another year until KDRV (channel 12) signed on.

For many years, KOBI branded itself as "Channel 5M", for its channel bullet designation within the Oregon State/Southern Oregon State edition of TV Guide, with a logo showing a "5" on an Interstate Highway shield, reflecting the area's major interstate highway, I-5. This type of station theming around interstate numbers is common with radio stations, but rare with television stations. The interstate shield motif was later extended to KOTI and KRCR. KOBI rebranded itself as "The News Channel" in 1998 and as "NBC 5" in 2004, but continues to theme its station logo around the I-5 shield.

Bill Smullin retired in 1985 and was succeeded by his daughter, Patricia C. "Patsy" Smullin, who serves as owner and president today.

KOBI added a DT2 channel for AccuWeather's local and national weather digital channel to KOBI's digital signal in early 2008. It was replaced by This TV in January 2014, then Cozi TV in December 2019. In May 2022, Quest and Twist were added.

== Programming ==
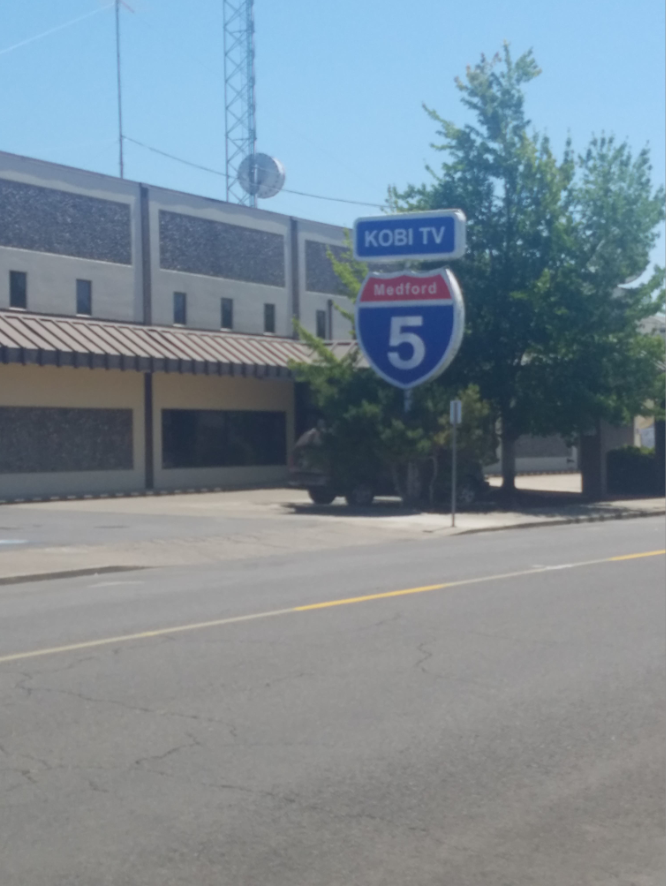
KOBI studios on South Fir Street in Downtown Medford

=== Jackpot Bingo ===
During the 1980s, KOBI broadcast a popular interactive game show called Jackpot Bingo, hosted by Tom Carnes. The show aired before Days of Our Lives and took after the popular Dialing for Dollars format. Jackpot Bingo gave contestants the opportunity to win up to $5,000 in cash by playing blackout bingo. However, contestants usually won the minimum $200 prize. Carnes was replaced by Sally Holliday in 1987 and the show was renamed $10,000 Jackpot Bingo as the prize money doubled. Still, contestants usually won $200. The show garnered the highest ratings for its time slot, although it was canceled in 1988.

=== Academic Challenge ===
The Academic Challenge quiz bowl program, similar to GE College Bowl, places local high schools in a head-to-head battle for the championship title and over $40,000 in scholarship money.

Twenty high schools from Southern Oregon and Northern California participate in the Academic Challenge. Each school brings in a team of five students, four participating and one alternate, who answer a series of questions from the host, NBC 5 chief meteorologist Jeff Heaton, on topics such as history, math, literature, current events and a variety of other categories.

At the end of this double-elimination competition the final two teams split the scholarship money (60% to the championship team, 40% to the runner-up team).

The idea for Academic Challenge started at KRCR-TV in Redding in 1998 and was hosted by Gary Gunter from 1998 to 2005, then Tim Mapes from then on. NBC 5's newly hired general manager Bob Wise brought the identically formatted program to southern Oregon in 2005.

The program regularly aired on Sundays at 6:30 p.m., or after NBC Sunday Night Football and NBC 5 News during the NFL season, but has since been canceled.

=== Southern Oregon Meth Project ===
In 2005, KOBI started a special program called the Southern Oregon Meth Project to educate viewers and concerned citizens about the dangers of methamphetamine and what can be done to prevent it. The project was headed up by KOBI's lead news anchor Christina Anderson, where she remained until her departure for KOVR in Sacramento in 2010. The project has since been disbanded.

=== News operation ===
KOBI presently broadcasts 22 hours of locally produced newscasts each week (with four hours each weekday and one hour each on Saturdays and Sundays).

KOTI previously produced its own newscasts (separate from KOBI) focusing on the eastern portion of the Medford–Klamath Falls market. The newscasts included NBC 2 News at 5, 6 and 11 p.m. Lyle Ahrens had served as the Klamath Basin news bureau chief, but retired in 2020.

At one time, KOTI aired a separate newscast at 6:30 p.m. with its own news bureau before becoming a repeater of KOBI.

After KMVU-DT discontinued its 7 a.m. and 10 p.m. newscasts in December 2023, KOBI added a 10 p.m. newscast to its Cozi TV subchannel on January 8, 2024, which returned to KMVU on June 9, 2025.

== Technical information ==
=== Subchannels ===
The stations' signals are multiplexed:

Subchannels of KOBI and KOTI
Channel		Res.	Short name		Programming
KOBI	KOTI	Res.	KOBI	KOTI	Programming
5.1	2.1	1080i	KOBI-TV	KOTI-TV	NBC
5.2	2.2	480i	COZI		Cozi TV
5.3	2.3	480i	QUEST		Quest
5.4	2.4	480i	TWIST		Shop LC

=== Analog-to-digital conversion ===
KOBI shut down its analog signal, over VHF channel 5, on February 17, 2009, the original target date on which full-power television stations in the United States were to transition from analog to digital broadcasts under federal mandate (which was later pushed back to June 12, 2009). The station's digital signal relocated from its pre-transition UHF channel 15 to VHF channel 5 for post-transition operations.

KOTI shut down its analog signal, over VHF channel 2, on February 17, 2009. The station's digital signal remained on its pre-transition VHF channel 13, using virtual channel 2.

=== Translators ===
KOBI has a UHF translator, K32DY-D, to serve non-antenna-rotator-equipped households between Medford and Ashland. It is located on Mt. Baldy, east of Phoenix.

- K07JT-D Brookings (translates KOBI)
- K07PZ-D Cave Junction (translates KOBI)
- K06NS-D Chiloquin (translates KOTI)
- K36BX-D Coos Bay (translates KOBI)
- K16LL-D Cottage Grove (translates KOBI)
- K25EN-D Gold Beach (translates KOBI)
- K31OQ-D Grants Pass (translates KOBI)
- K33PM-D Grants Pass (translates KOBI)
- K34KJ-D Harbor (translates KOBI)
- K07NR-D Lakeview, etc. (translates KOTI)
- K32DY-D Medford (translates KOBI)
- K36IB-D Midland, etc. (translates KOTI)
- K08AK-D Port Orford, etc. (translates KOBI)
- K20MK-D Roseburg (translates KOBI)
- K13MI-D Squaw Valley, etc. (translates KOBI)
- K07HS-D Williams (translates KOBI)
- K25OK-D Yoncalla (translates KOBI)
- K34OW-D Yreka, CA (translates KOBI)
