= London Springs, Oregon =

Unincorporated community in the state of Oregon, United States

- Unincorporated community
- Location within Oregon Location within the United States
- Coordinates: 43°37′54″N 123°05′28″W
- Country: United States
- State: Oregon
- County: Lane
- Elevation: 896 ft (273 m)
- Time zone: UTC−08:00 (Pacific (PST))
  - Summer (DST): UTC−07:00 (PDT)
- ZIP Code: 97424
- Area codes: 458 and 541
- GNIS feature ID: 1123364

London Springs is an unincorporated community in Lane County, Oregon, United States. It lies 11.33 miles (18.23 km) south-southwest of Cottage Grove. London Springs is near the Coast Fork Willamette River, south of Cottage Grove Lake.

The unincorporated community of London is less than a mile from London Springs. London post office ran from 1902 until 1919. The office was formerly named "Amos" and was located two miles south of London, on a tributary of the Coast Fork Willamette River. Amos post office was founded in 1898 and ran until its move to London. It was named for John Amos Sutherland, son of postmaster John Sutherland. Levi Geer developed a mineral spring here, and it is unknown why he named the place "London", but when the post office moved to the community, it was renamed after the new location. Geer and Sutherland operated a general store in which the post office was located for a time.

Geer opened the Calapooya Mineral Springs Hotel in London in 1904.

Territorial Seed Company has a 44-acre (18 ha) trial ground and organic research farm in London Springs.

== Climate ==
This region experiences warm (but not hot) and dry summers, with no average monthly temperatures above 71.6 °F. According to the Köppen Climate Classification system, London Springs has a warm-summer Mediterranean climate, abbreviated "Csb" on climate maps.
