= Channel 30 digital TV stations in the United States =

The following television stations broadcast on digital channel 30 in the United States:

- K30AE-D in Alva, Oklahoma
- K30AF-D in Alexandria, Minnesota, on virtual channel 9, which rebroadcasts WFTC
- K30AL-D in Iola, Kansas
- K30BN-D in Coos Bay, Oregon
- K30BU-D in Leadore, Idaho
- K30CN-D in Ely, Nevada
- K30DC-D in Dove Creek, etc., Colorado, on virtual channel 30
- K30DS-D in Lovelock, Nevada
- K30DT-D in Flagstaff, Arizona
- K30EJ-D in Crested Butte, Colorado, on virtual channel 13, which rebroadcasts K13AV-D
- K30EK-D in Dulce & Lumberton, New Mexico
- K30EW-D in Monument, etc., Oregon
- K30FN-D in St. James, Minnesota
- K30FO-D in Peetz, Colorado, on virtual channel 2, which rebroadcasts KWGN-TV
- K30FP-D in Santa Rosa, New Mexico
- K30FS-D in Hawthorne, Nevada
- K30FV-D in Cambridge, Nebraska
- K30FY-D in Guymon, Oklahoma
- K30FZ-D in Willmar, Minnesota, on virtual channel 9, which rebroadcasts WFTC
- K30GA-D in Garfield County, Utah
- K30GG-D in Chloride, Arizona
- K30GJ-D in Colfax, New Mexico
- K30GL-D in Many Farms, Arizona
- K30GM-D in Capitan/Ruidoso, New Mexico
- K30GO-D in Pleasant Valley, Colorado, on virtual channel 2, which rebroadcasts KWGN-TV
- K30GU-D in Morongo Valley, California, on virtual channel 30
- K30GV-D in Shoshoni, Wyoming
- K30HA-D in Yuma, Colorado, on virtual channel 9, which rebroadcasts KUSA
- K30HB-D in Agana, Guam
- K30HD-D in Tucumcari, New Mexico
- K30HH-D in Memphis, Texas
- K30HJ-D in Cortez, etc., Colorado
- K30HY-D in Verdi/Mogul, Nevada
- K30JB-D in Morgan, etc., Utah, on virtual channel 2, which rebroadcasts KUTV
- K30JD-D in Prescott, Arizona, on virtual channel 5, which rebroadcasts KPHO-TV
- K30JE-D in Lihue, Hawaii
- K30JG-D in Randolph & Woodruff, Utah
- K30JM-D in Colorado Springs, Colorado
- K30JP-D in Sayre, Oklahoma
- K30JQ-D in Carbondale, Colorado
- K30JS-D in Yreka, California
- K30JT-D in La Pine, Oregon
- K30KC-D in Samak, Utah, on virtual channel 14, which rebroadcasts KJZZ-TV
- K30KE-D in Wanship, Utah
- K30KG-D in Coalville, etc., Utah
- K30KH-D in Emery, Utah
- K30KJ-D in Manti & Ephrain, Utah, on virtual channel 16, which rebroadcasts KUPX-TV
- K30KK-D in Fountain Green, Utah
- K30KM-D in Vernal, etc., Utah, on virtual channel 4, which rebroadcasts KTVX
- K30KQ-D in Jackson, Minnesota
- K30KU-D in Silver City, New Mexico
- K30KV-D in Crownpoint, New Mexico
- K30KX-D in Taos, New Mexico
- K30KY-D in Philipsburg, Montana
- K30LB-D in Beowawe, Nevada
- K30LC-D in Tampico, etc., Montana
- K30LD-D in Wichita Falls, Texas
- K30LF-D in Duchesne, Utah, on virtual channel 2, which rebroadcasts KUTV
- K30LL-D in Kingman, Arizona
- K30LS-D in Sandpoint, Idaho
- K30LY-D in Manila, etc., Utah
- K30MC-D in Lewiston, Idaho
- K30MG-D in Kirksville, Missouri
- K30MH-D in Overton, Nevada
- K30MJ-D in Libby, Montana
- K30MN-D in Barstow, California
- K30MW-D in Sweetgrass, etc., Montana
- K30MX-D in Wyodak, Wyoming
- K30NY-D in Victorville, etc., California, on virtual channel 30
- K30OA-D in Milton-Freewater, Oregon
- K30OC-D in Cottage Grove, Oregon
- K30OE-D in Alton, Utah
- K30OF-D in Baker Valley, Oregon
- K30OG-D in La Grande, Oregon
- K30OI-D in Camp Verde, Arizona
- K30OJ-D in Las Vegas, New Mexico
- K30OK-D in Tulsa, Oklahoma
- K30OL-D in Washington, etc., Utah, on virtual channel 7, which rebroadcasts KUED
- K30OM-D in Monterey, California
- K30ON-D in Capitol Reef National Park, Utah
- K30OO-D in Caineville, Utah
- K30OP-D in Hanksville, Utah
- K30OQ-D in Fremont, Utah
- K30OR-D in Escalante, Utah
- K30OS-D in Antimony, Utah
- K30OT-D in Tropic/Cannonville, Utah
- K30OU-D in Cody, etc., Wyoming
- K30OV-D in Boulder, Utah
- K30OW-D in Fishlake Resort, Utah
- K30OX-D in Montpelier, Idaho
- K30OY-D in Logan, Utah, on virtual channel 4, which rebroadcasts KTVX
- K30PA-D in Roseau, Minnesota
- K30PB-D in Shurz, Nevada
- K30PC-D in Henefer & Echo, Utah
- K30PD-D in Kanab, Utah
- K30PE-D in Parowan, Enoch etc., Utah
- K30PF-D in Fillmore etc., Utah
- K30PG-D in Delta/Oak City, etc, Utah
- K30PH-D in Beaver, etc., Utah
- K30PI-D in Garrison, Utah
- K30PJ-D in Beryl/New Castle/Modena, Utah
- K30PK-D in Kanarraville, etc., Utah
- K30PM-D in Price, Utah
- K30PN-D in Green River, Utah
- K30PO-D in Scofield, Utah
- K30PP-D in Ferron, Utah
- K30PQ-D in Clear Creek, Utah
- K30PR-D in Pahrump, Nevada
- K30PT-D in Kalispell & Lakeside, Montana
- K30PW-D in Salmon, Idaho
- K30PX-D in Winnemucca, Nevada
- K30PY-D in Parlin, Colorado
- K30PZ-D in Litchfield, California
- K30QA-D in Coeur D'Alene, Idaho
- K30QB-D in Shreveport, Louisiana
- K30QC-D in Ridgecrest, California, on virtual channel 7, which rebroadcasts KABC-TV
- K30QD-D in Ontario, etc., Oregon
- K30QE-D in Panaca, Nevada
- K30QG-D in Alexandria, Louisiana
- K30QH-D in Burley, etc., Idaho
- K30QI-D in Alamogordo, New Mexico
- K30QR-D in Bryan, Texas
- K30QV-D in Iowa, Louisiana
- K30QX-D in Duluth, Minnesota
- K30QY-D in Oakland, Minnesota
- K30RA-D in Racine, Minnesota
- K38MK-D in Cheyenne Wells, Colorado
- KABB in San Antonio, Texas
- KAHC-LD in Sacramento, California, on virtual channel 43
- KBAD-LD in Pago Pago, American Samoa
- KBLN-TV in Grants Pass, Oregon
- KBZO-LD in Lubbock, Texas
- KCAU-TV in Sioux City, Iowa
- KCVU in Paradise, California
- KDFS-CD in Santa Maria, California
- KDNU-LD in Las Vegas, Nevada
- KFOL-CD in Houma, Louisiana
- KFPB-LD in Gila River Indian Community, Arizona
- KFSN-TV in Fresno, California
- KGBD-LD in Great Bend, Kansas
- KGWN-TV in Cheyenne, Wyoming
- KJLA in Ventura, California, uses KXLA's spectrum, on virtual channel 57
- KKAF-LD in Fayetteville, Arkansas
- KKPD-LD in Tyler, Texas
- KLJB in Davenport, Iowa
- KLPD-LD in Denver, Colorado, on virtual channel 28
- KLRT-TV in Little Rock, Arkansas
- KMBB-LD in North Platte, Nebraska
- KMPX in Decatur, Texas, on virtual channel 29
- KOAB-TV in Warm Springs, Oregon
- KOMO-TV in Seattle, Washington, on virtual channel 4
- KOTV-DT in Caney, Kansas
- KPDX in Vancouver, Washington, an ATSC 3.0 station, on virtual channel 49
- KPLE-CD in Killeen, Texas
- KPTH in Sioux City, Iowa
- KPXE-TV in Kansas City, Missouri, on virtual channel 50
- KQED in San Francisco, California, on virtual channel 9
- KQEH in San Jose, California, uses KQED's spectrum, on virtual channel 54
- KQFX-LD in Columbia, Missouri
- KQSY-LD in Corpus Christi, Texas
- KSMI-LD in Wichita, Kansas
- KSTC-TV in Minneapolis, Minnesota, on virtual channel 5
- KTAB-TV in Abilene, Texas
- KTVX in Salt Lake City, Utah, on virtual channel 4
- KUAT-TV in Tucson, Arizona
- KUNW-CD in Yakima, Washington
- KWPL-LD in Santa Fe, New Mexico
- KWWT in Odessa, Texas
- KXJB-LD in Fargo, North Dakota
- KXKW-LD in Lafayette, Louisiana
- KXLA in Rancho Palos Verdes, California, on virtual channel 44
- KXLN-DT in Rosenberg, Texas, on virtual channel 45
- KYW-TV in Philadelphia, Pennsylvania, on virtual channel 3
- KZCO-LD in Denver, Colorado, uses KLPD-LD's spectrum, on virtual channel 7
- W30BU-D in Green Bay, Wisconsin
- W30CO-D in Wheeling, West Virginia
- W30CS-D in Zionville, North Carolina
- W30CV-D in Hilton Head Island, South Carolina
- W30DM-D in Manchester, etc., Vermont
- W30DN-D in Manteo, North Carolina
- W30DZ-D in Fence, Wisconsin
- W30ED-D in Guayama, Puerto Rico, on virtual channel 44
- W30EE-D in Jacksonville, Florida
- W30EF-D in Jefferson, North Carolina
- W30EG-D in Knoxville, Tennessee
- W30EH-D in Fort Wayne, Indiana
- W30EI-D in Sharon, Pennsylvania
- W30EM-D in Ocala, Florida
- W30ER-D in Wilmington, North Carolina
- W30ES-D in Columbus, Mississippi
- W30EZ-D in Purvis, Mississippi
- W30FA-D in Homerville, Georgia
- WAGT-CD in Augusta, Georgia
- WAWW-LD in Rochester, New York
- WAXN-CG in China Grove, North Carolina, on virtual channel 64, which rebroadcasts WAXN-TV
- WBUD-LD in Atlanta, Georgia, on virtual channel 26
- WBUO-LD in Olean, New York
- WCRN-LD in Boston, Massachusetts, on virtual channel 31
- WCZS-LD in Chambersburg, Pennsylvania
- WDBJ in Roanoke, Virginia
- WDCI-LD in Chicago, Illinois, on virtual channel 57
- WDGA-CD in Dalton, Georgia
- WEDH in Hartford, Connecticut, on virtual channel 24
- WEDY in New Haven, Connecticut, uses WEDH's spectrum, on virtual channel 65
- WEFS in Cocoa, Florida, on virtual channel 68
- WEIQ in Mobile, Alabama
- WEIU-TV in Charleston, Illinois
- WELW-LD in Evansville, Indiana
- WFWG-LD in Richmond, Virginia
- WGIQ in Louisville, Alabama
- WHIG-CD in Rocky Mount, North Carolina, on virtual channel 31
- WHIZ-TV in Zanesville, Ohio
- WIAT in Birmingham, Alabama
- WIAV-CD in Washington, D.C., an ATSC 3.0 station, on virtual channel 58
- WKMR in Morehead, Kentucky
- WKPC-TV in Louisville, Kentucky
- WLBT in Jackson, Mississippi
- WLFT-CD in Baton Rouge, Louisiana
- WLOW-LD in Charleston, South Carolina
- WMGT-TV in Macon, Georgia
- WNAB in Nashville, Tennessee, an ATSC 3.0 station, on virtual channel 58
- WNEM-TV in Bay City, Michigan
- WNJJ-LD in New York, New York
- WNTE-LD in Mayaguez, Puerto Rico
- WNYN-LD in New York, New York, on virtual channel 39
- WODK-LD in St. Louis, Missouri, on virtual channel 45
- WPTG-CD in Pittsburgh, Pennsylvania, on virtual channel 69
- WPXE-TV in Kenosha, Wisconsin, on virtual channel 55
- WQEK-LD in Clarksdale, Mississippi
- WRFB in Carolina, Puerto Rico, on virtual channel 5, which rebroadcasts WORA-TV
- WRLD-LD in Kingston, Pennsylvania
- WRMD-CD in Tampa, Florida, on virtual channel 49
- WSCV in Fort Lauderdale, Florida, on virtual channel 51
- WSDI-LD in Indianapolis, Indiana, on virtual channel 30
- WSJV in Elkhart, Indiana
- WSPY-LD in Earlville, Illinois, on virtual channel 31
- WSVW-LD in Harrisonburg, Virginia
- WTCT in Marion, Illinois
- WUNU in Lumberton, North Carolina, on virtual channel 31
- WUTR in Utica, New York
- WVIZ (DRT) in Cleveland, Ohio, on virtual channel 25
- WVUP-CD in Tallahassee, Florida
- WVWW-LD in Vero Beach, Florida
- WWDT-CD in Naples, Florida
- WXII-LD in Cedar, Michigan
- WXMI in Kalamazoo, Michigan
- WYDC in Corning, New York
- WYFF in Greenville, South Carolina
- WYNB-LD in Ellenville, New York, on virtual channel 30
- WZBJ in Danville, Virginia, uses WDBJ's spectrum
- WZCD-LD in Cincinnati, Ohio

The following stations, which are no longer licensed, formerly broadcast on digital channel 30 in the United States:

- K30FL-D in Port Angeles, Washington
- K30IV-D in Wallowa, Oregon
- K30KN-D in Wyola, Montana
- K30KR-D in Boise, Idaho
- K30MF-D in Jonesboro, Arkansas
- K30MI-D in Redding, California
- K30MY-D in Jackson, Wyoming
- K30QF-D in Hermiston, Washington
- K30QW-D in Geronimo, Oklahoma
- KCIO-LD in Ontario, California
- W30DW-D in Tifton, Georgia
- W30ET-D in Flint, Michigan
- W30EX-D in Lima, Ohio
- WAGT in Augusta, Georgia
- WNNB-CD in Beaver, Pennsylvania
- WTBS-LD in Atlanta, Georgia
- WVCZ-LD in Valdosta, Georgia
