= Channel 30 virtual TV stations in the United States =

The following television stations operate on virtual channel 30 in the United States:

- K05NF-D in Salina, Utah
- K11IY-D in Battle Mountain, Nevada
- K11XI-D in Beaver etc., Utah
- K14LW-D in Myton, Utah
- K14RN-D in Scipio, Utah
- K16NK-D in Cave Junction, Oregon
- K17EZ-D in Rogue River, Oregon
- K17JD-D in Mount Pleasant, Utah
- K17NN-D in Leamington, Utah
- K18KO-D in Rural Summit County, Utah
- K19MC-D in Bonnerdale, Arkansas
- K20NP-D in Spring Glen, Utah
- K21NK-D in Cedar City, Utah
- K21OZ-D in Shreveport, Louisiana
- K22MP-D in Richfield, etc., Utah
- K23EX-D in Medford, Oregon
- K24IN-D in Green River, Utah
- K24ND-D in Orangeville, Utah
- K25CV-D in Hays, Kansas
- K25IM-D in Medford, Oregon
- K25JT-D in Blanding/Monticello, Utah
- K25NN-D in Nephi, Utah
- K25NO-D in Gasquet, California
- K26IK-D in Heber & Midway, Utah
- K26JB-D in Wells, Nevada
- K26OF-D in Roosevelt, Utah
- K27KV-D in Evanston, Wyoming
- K27NJ-D in Rural Beaver, etc., Utah
- K27NP-D in Duchesne, Utah
- K27NQ-D in Helper, Utah
- K27NU-D in Green River, Utah
- K27NV-D in Scofield, Utah
- K27NW-D in East Price, Utah
- K27NY-D in Clear Creek, Utah
- K28PD-D in Delta, Oak City, Utah
- K28PE-D in Kanarraville, etc., Utah
- K28PF-D in Vernal, etc., Utah
- K28PG-D in Price, Utah
- K28PJ-D in Elko, Nevada
- K28PT-D in Manila, etc., Utah
- K29FY-D in Henefer/Echo, Utah
- K29IY-D in Ferron, Utah
- K29IZ-D in Huntington, Utah
- K29MF-D in Peoa and Oakley, Utah
- K29MY-D in Randolph, Utah
- K30AE-D in Alva, Oklahoma
- K30GU-D in Morongo Valley, California
- K30HB-D in Agana, Guam
- K30HH-D in Memphis, Texas
- K30HJ-D in Cortez, etc., Colorado
- K30JT-D in La Pine, Oregon
- K30KE-D in Wanship, Utah
- K30KH-D in Emery, Utah
- K30LD-D in Wichita Falls, Texas
- K30MC-D in Lewiston, Idaho
- K30MN-D in Barstow, California
- K30NY-D in Victorville, etc., California
- K30QR-D in Bryan, Texas
- K30QV-D in Iowa, Louisiana
- K30QX-D in Duluth, Minnesota
- K30QY-D in Oakland, Minnesota
- K31FW-D in Lyman, Wyoming
- K31NH-D in Klamath Falls, Oregon
- K32IT-D in Coalville and Adjacent Area, Utah
- K32NE-D in Garrison, etc., Utah
- K33FY-D in Park City, Utah
- K33GJ-D in Merlin, Oregon
- K33HO-D in Soda Springs, Idaho
- K33NP-D in Russell, Kansas
- K33OZ-D in Parowan, Enoch, etc., Utah
- K33PC-D in Santa Clara, California
- K34GO-D in Fillmore, Utah
- K34HE-D in Elko, Nevada
- K34OO-D in Blanding/Monticello, Utah
- K34OU-D in Beryl, Modena, etc., Utah
- K36MI-D in Fountain Green, Utah
- K36NY-D in Yreka, California
- K36OI-D in Manti/Ephraim, Utah
- K36OX-D in Samak, Utah
- K47GI-D in Grants Pass, Oregon
- KAMK-LD in Eugene, Oregon
- KBAD-LD in Pago Pago, American Samoa
- KBLN-TV in Grants Pass, Oregon
- KCJO-LD in Saint Joseph, Missouri
- KDFS-CD in Santa Maria, California
- KDNL-TV in St. Louis, Missouri
- KEGS-LD in Las Vegas, Nevada
- KFOL-CD in Houma, Louisiana
- KFSN-TV in Fresno, California
- KGBD-LD in Great Bend, Kansas
- KHTX-LD in Huntsville, Texas
- KJUN-CD in Morgan City, Louisiana
- KKAF-LD in Fayetteville, Arkansas
- KKPD-LD in Tyler, Texas
- KKTF-LD in Chico, California
- KKYK-CD in Little Rock, Arkansas
- KMBB-LD in North Platte, Nebraska
- KPXN-TV in San Bernardino, California
- KQSY-LD in Corpus Christi, Texas
- KSMI-LD in Wichita, Kansas
- KTUZ-TV in Shawnee, Oklahoma
- KUCW in Ogden, Utah
- KUTA-LD in Ogden, Utah
- KWWT in Odessa, Texas
- KXJB-LD in Fargo, North Dakota
- W11DM-D in Collegedale, Tennessee
- W26EE-D in Wittenberg, Wisconsin
- W30BU-D in Green Bay, Wisconsin
- W30CV-D in Hilton Head Island, South Carolina
- W30DM-D in Manchester, etc., Vermont
- W30EI-D in Sharon, Pennsylvania
- W30EM-D in Ocala, Florida
- W30ES-D in Columbus, Mississippi
- W30EZ-D in Purvis, Mississippi
- W30FA-D in Homerville, Georgia
- WABE-TV in Atlanta, Georgia
- WAWW-LD in Rochester, New York
- WBUO-LD in Olean, New York
- WELW-LD in Evansville, Indiana
- WFDY-LD in Myrtle Beach, South Carolina
- WFOX-TV in Jacksonville, Florida
- WFWG-LD in Richmond, Virginia
- WGBC in Meridian, Mississippi
- WGCU in Fort Myers, Florida
- WGTE-TV in Toledo, Ohio
- WLFT-CD in Baton Rouge, Louisiana
- WLMT in Memphis, Tennessee
- WLPD-CD in Plano, Illinois
- WNSC-TV in Rock Hill, South Carolina
- WNYD-LD in New York, New York
- WQCW in Portsmouth, Ohio
- WRAY-TV in Wilson, North Carolina
- WRLD-LD in Kingston, Pennsylvania
- WRZH-LP in Red Lion-Harrisburg, Pennsylvania
- WWID-TV in Orlando, Florida
- WSDI-LD in Indianapolis, Indiana
- WSJP-LD in Aquadilla, Puerto Rico
- WSKA in Corning, New York
- WSVW-LD in Harrisonburg, Virginia
- WTAM-LD in Tampa, Florida
- WTIU in Bloomington, Indiana
- WUXP-TV in Nashville, Tennessee
- WVCY-TV in Milwaukee, Wisconsin
- WVIT in New Britain, Connecticut
- WXVK-LD in Columbus, Georgia
- WZCD-LD in Cincinnati, Ohio
- WZLH-LD in Syracuse, New York

The following television stations, which are no longer licensed, formerly operated on virtual channel 30:

- K22FC-D in Grants Pass, Oregon
- K26HS-D in Tillamook, Oregon
- K30KN-D in Wyola, Montana
- K30KR-D in Boise, Idaho
- K30MF-D in Jonesboro, Arkansas
- K30MY-D in Jackson, Wyoming
- K30QW-D in Geronimo, Oklahoma
- K44FH-D in Coos Bay, Oregon
- K45IA-D in Rock Springs, Wyoming
- KWDA-LD in Dallas, Texas
- W30ET-D in Flint, Michigan
- WVCZ-LD in Valdosta, Georgia
