= Channel 30 =

Channel 30 refers to several television stations:

== Argentina ==
- Channel 30 in Buenos Aires

== Canada ==
The following television stations operate on virtual channel 30 in Canada:

- CFKS-DT in Sherbrooke, Quebec
- CIVO-DT in Gatineau, Quebec

== Chile ==
- Mega in Iquique

== See also ==
- Channel 30 virtual TV stations in the United States

For UHF frequencies covering 566-572 MHz:

- Channel 30 TV stations in Canada
- Channel 30 TV stations in Mexico
- Channel 30 digital TV stations in the United States
- Channel 30 low-power TV stations in the United States
