= KGLA =

KGLA may refer to:

- KGLA (AM), a radio station (830 AM) licensed to serve Norco, Louisiana, United States
- KGLA-DT, a television station (channel 35, virtual 42) licensed to serve Hammond, Louisiana
- WFNO (AM), a radio station (1540 AM) licensed to serve Gretna, Louisiana, which held the call sign KGLA from 1969 to 2019
- KOST 103.5 MHz, a radio station in Los Angeles, California, United States that used the KGLA callsign from 1957 to 1966
