= WFNO =

WFNO may refer to:

- WFNO (AM), a radio station (1540 AM) licensed to serve Gretna, Louisiana, United States
- KGLA (AM), a radio station (830 AM) licensed to serve Norco, Louisiana, which held the call sign WFNO from 1996 to 2019
