= KBZO =

KBZO may refer to:

- KBZO (AM), a radio station (1460 AM) licensed to serve Lubbock, Texas, United States
- KBZO-LD, a low-power television station (channel 30, virtual 51) licensed to serve Lubbock, Texas
