= KNOL (FM) =

Coordinates: 29.8085°N 89.7614°W

Jean Lafitte, Louisiana; United States
- Broadcast area: New Orleans
- Frequency: 107.5 MHz

Programming
- Format: Contemporary Christian
- Network: K-Love

Ownership
- Owner: Educational Media Foundation

History
- First air date: December 31, 1965
- Former call signs: KCIL-FM (1965–1969); KCIL (1969–2011); KXMG (2011–2015)
- Former frequencies: 107.1 MHz (1965–1986)
- Call sign meaning: "K-Love New Orleans"

Technical information
- Facility ID: 25520
- Class: C2
- ERP: 15,000 watts
- HAAT: 277 meters

Links
- Webcast: Listen Live
- Website: klove.com

KNOL (107.5 FM), branded as "K-Love", is a contemporary Christian formatted non-commercial radio station serving the New Orleans metropolitan area. The station is owned by Educational Media Foundation and broadcasts at 107.5 MHz with an ERP of 15 kW from Jean Lafitte, Louisiana.

== History ==
Although KNOL has been a country music formatted station for most of its existence under the call letters KCIL, the station was a Rhythmic Top 40 as "Hot 107" in the late 1980s.

In 2007, KCIL filed with the FCC to move its city of license to Jean Lafitte, in order to better serve New Orleans. The change was approved in May 2007.

On May 2, 2011, KCIL changed its call letters to KXMG. On July 1, 2011, KXMG changed its format to Spanish Contemporary Hit Radio, branded as "Mega 107.5". For most of 2011, reception quality for KXMG was inconsistent within the most heavily urbanized areas of the New Orleans metropolitan area and nearly non-existent north of Lake Pontchartrain.

KXMG was an affiliate of the New Orleans Saints radio network for Spanish-language broadcasting.

On March 17, 2015, KXMG changed their format to Educational Media Foundation's "K-Love" contemporary Christian format. The station changed its call sign to KNOL on May 12, 2015, after EMF acquired the station outright from Sunburst Media-Louisiana, LLC, at a purchase price of $3.2 million.

== Former competitors ==
- Crescent City Radio
- 830 AM WFNO
- 1540 AM KGLA
