= KTNP =

KTNP may refer to:

- Twentynine Palms Airport (ICAO code KTNP)
- KTNP-LD, a low-power television station (channel 4, virtual 47) licensed to serve Colorado Springs, Colorado, United States; see List of television stations in Colorado
- KFFF (FM), a radio station (93.3 FM) licensed to serve Bennington, Nebraska, United States, which held the call sign KTNP from 1996 to 2000
- KBZO (AM), a radio station (1460 AM) licensed to serve Lubbock, Texas, United States, which held the call sign KTNP from 1993 to 1994
