= WHMM =

WHMM may refer to:

- KGLA-DT, a digital television station (channel 42) licensed to Hammond, Louisiana, United States, which used the call sign WHMM-DT from November 2004 to August 2007
- WHUT-TV, a television station (channel 32) licensed to Washington, D.C., United States, which used the call signs WHMM and WHMM-TV until January 1998
