= KGLA-DT =

Television station in Hammond, Louisiana

- Hammond–New Orleans, Louisiana; United States
- City: Hammond, Louisiana
- Channels: Digital: 35 (UHF); Virtual: 42
- Branding: Telemundo 42; Telenoticias 42 (newscasts)

Programming
- Affiliations: 42.1: Telemundo; for others, see § Subchannels

Ownership
- Owner: Mayavision, Inc.
- Sister stations: KGLA, WFNO

History
- Founded: September 20, 1996
- First air date: June 5, 2007
- Former call signs: WHMM-DT (June–August 2007); KGLA-TV (August–December 2007)
- Former channel numbers: Digital: 42 (UHF, 2007–2020)
- Call sign meaning: Derived from sister radio station KGLA (now WFNO), meaning Gretna, Louisiana

Technical information
- Licensing authority: FCC
- Facility ID: 83945
- ERP: 681 kW
- HAAT: 309 m (1,014 ft)
- Transmitter coordinates: 29°58′42″N 89°56′26″W
- Translator(s): WLFT-CD 30.2 Baton Rouge

Links
- Public license information: Public file; LMS
- Website: www.telemundoneworleans.com

KGLA-DT (channel 42) is a television station licensed to Hammond, Louisiana, United States, serving the New Orleans area as an affiliate of the Spanish-language network Telemundo. Owned by Mayavision, Inc., the station maintains studios on South I-10 Service Road West in Metairie, and its transmitter is located on Paris Road/Highway 47 (northeast of Chalmette).

== History ==
The station first signed on the air on June 5, 2007, as WHMM-DT. Channel 42 has operated as a digital-only station from its sign-on, as one of a handful of full-power television stations around the United States to sign on without a companion analog signal. The station debuted with an effective radiated power of 1 megawatt, the maximum wattage currently allowed by the Federal Communications Commission (FCC) for digital television stations; as a result, it is the only full-power Spanish-language television station in the New Orleans market (Estrella TV affiliate WTNO-CD (channel 22), which debuted in August 2006 as the first Spanish-language station in the market, operates with a Class A license).

On April 23, 2007, Mayavision announced that it had signed an agreement with Telemundo to affiliate with WHMM-DT. Channel 42 was originally slated to debut in mid-May of that year, however its launch was delayed until the following month. At the time the station launched, the Hispanic population in New Orleans had increased between 2005 and 2007, from 6% to between 12% and 14%, which was attributed to the growth of re-construction jobs following Hurricane Katrina.

The station changed its call letters to KGLA-TV on August 27, 2007. On December 21 of that year, the "-TV" suffix in the station's callsign was replaced with a "-DT" suffix. KGLA's city of license, Hammond, and its studios in Metairie and transmitter near Chalmette, are all located east of the Mississippi River, making it one of the few broadcast stations in the country whose callsign begins with a "K" that is licensed to a location east of the Mississippi River. The KGLA callsign was grandfathered to the television station, from Gretna-licensed radio station KGLA (1540 AM, now WFNO), which Mayavision holds a 50% stake in conjunction with co-owner Crocodile Broadcasting. The station launched its own website in late 2007.

== Subchannels ==
The station's signal is multiplexed:

Subchannels of KGLA-DT
Subchannel	Res.	Short name	Programming
42.1	1080i	KGLA-DT	Telemundo
42.2	480i	Laff	Laff (4:3)
42.3	480i	MovieS	MovieSphere Gold (4:3)
42.4	480i	WLFT-30	SonLife (WLFT-CD) (4:3)

Simulcast of subchannels of another station
