= Channel 30 TV stations in Mexico =

The following television stations broadcast on digital or analog channel 30 in Mexico:

- XHAB-TDT in Matamoros, Tamaulipas
- XHAF-TDT in Tepic, Nayarit
- XHBAS-TDT in Banamichi, Sonora
- XHBZC-TDT in La Paz, Baja California Sur
- XHCBC-TDT in Ciudad Constitución, Baja California Sur
- XHCCA-TDT in Campeche, Campeche
- XHCLT-TDT in Celaya, Guanajuato
- XHCOM-TDT in Comitán de Domínguez, Chiapas
- XHCOQ-TDT in Cozumel, Quintana Roo
- XHGDU-TDT in San Diego de la Unión, Guanajuato
- XHGJI-TDT in San José Iturbide, Guanajuato
- XHGSC-TDT in Santa Catarina, Guanajuato
- XHHO-TDT in Hermosillo, Sonora
- XHICCH-TDT in Chihuahua, Chihuahua
- XHIR-TDT in Iguala, Guerrero
- XHJCI-TDT in Ciudad Juárez, Chihuahua
- XHJCM-TDT in Aguascalientes, Aguascalientes
- XHLBT-TDT in Lázaro Cárdenas, Michoacán de Ocampo
- XHLUT-TDT in La Rosita - Villagrán, Tamaulipas
- XHMH-TDT in Hidalgo del Parral, Chihuahua
- XHND-TDT in Durango, Durango
- XHOPEM-TDT in Toluca, México
- XHOPMQ-TDT in Querétaro, Querétaro de Arteaga
- XHOPPA-TDT in Puebla, Puebla
- XHPNT-TDT in Piedras Negras, Coahuila
- XHPSO-TDT in Matías Romero, Oaxaca
- XHQ-TDT in Culiacán, Sinaloa
- XHRCG-TDT in Saltillo, Coahuila de Zaragoza
- XHRCS-TDT in San Luis Rio Colorado, Sonora
- XHSPG-TDT in Acapulco, Guerrero
- XHSPR-TDT in México City
- XHTAP-TDT in Tapachula, Chiapas
- XHTET-TDT in Tenosique, Tabasco
- XHTON-TDT in Tonalá, Chiapas
- XHTP-TDT in Mérida, Yucatán
- XHTVL-TDT in Villahermosa, Tabasco
- XHURT-TDT in Uruapan, Michoacán de Ocampo
- XHVST-TDT in Ciudad Valles, San Luis Potosí
- XHZAE-TDT in Zacatecas, Zacatecas
