= KFOL-CD =

Television station in Houma, Louisiana

KFOL-CD and KJUN-CD
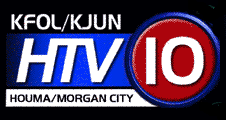

KFOL-CD: Houma, Louisiana; KJUN-CD: Morgan City, Louisiana; United States
- Channels for KFOL-CD: Digital: 30 (UHF); Virtual: 30
- Channels for KJUN-CD: Digital: 7 (VHF); Virtual: 30
- Branding: HTV 10

Programming
- Affiliations: 30.1: Independent

Ownership
- Owner: Folse Communications, LLC

History
- First air date: August 28, 1989
- Former call signs: KFOL-CD: K30EM, K60GH (CP-never used), K11SY; KJUN-CD: K07UT
- Call sign meaning: KFOL-CD: Folse Communications (owner); KJUN-CD: K-JUN (Cajun)

Technical information
- Licensing authority: FCC
- Facility ID: KFOL-CD: 24978; KJUN-CD: 24979
- Class: CD
- ERP: KFOL-CD: 15 kW; KJUN-CD: 2.75 kW
- HAAT: KFOL-CD: 122.5 m (402 ft); KJUN-CD: 99.5 m (326 ft)
- Transmitter coordinates: KFOL-CD: 29°36′25.2″N 90°41′42.6″W; KJUN-CD: 29°45′15.6″N 91°10′25.5″W

Links
- Public license information: KFOL-CD: Public file; LMS; KJUN-CD: Public file; LMS
- Website: www.htv10.tv

KFOL-CD (channel 30) is a low-power, Class A independent television station in Houma, Louisiana, United States. It is owned by station manager and news anchor Martin Folse via licensee Folse Communications. KFOL-CD's studios are located on Main Street/LA 24 in downtown Houma, and its transmitter is located on Hunley Court (southwest of the Saint Louis Bayou) on the city's northeast side.

KFOL's programming is simulcast on translator station KJUN-CD (VHF digital channel 7) in Morgan City, with transmitter on LA 70 in rural southern St. Martin Parish (northeast of Morgan City). Together, the two stations utilize the unified brand HTV 10 ("HTV" meaning "Houma Television").

== History ==
KFOL and KJUN both first signed on the air on August 28, 1989.

On September 1, 2008, during the height of Hurricane Gustav, KFOL's transmitter tower, located behind its studio facility, collapsed. Interrupting a live news broadcast on the station, anchor Martin Folse thought that the loud crash came from the station's tape library (located behind the studio), until an operator in KFOL/KJUN's control room informed him that the tower had fallen to the ground. Until new transmitter facilities were set up, the station temporarily streamed local news updates focused on Terrebonne Parish via its website. KFOL provided a direct feed to area cable providers, restoring service until a temporary tower was erected.

On January 20, 2014, KFOL began broadcasting from a new studio facility located on Main Street in downtown Houma, within a building that formerly housed a Dupont's Department Store location.

== Programming ==
The two stations generally carry locally produced programming including news and public affairs programs. Programs broadcast by KFOL/KJUN include the weeknight news, interview and call-in program Bayou Time; the interview program One on One; the New Orleans Saints–focused sports magazine series Saints on the Bayou; the college football analysis program The Charlie Stubbs Show; the sports wrap-up program Friday Night Sports, and The Beat (a series similar in format to the long-running reality series Cops that follows local police officers).

== Technical information ==
=== Subchannel ===
Subchannel of KFOL-CD and KJUN-CD
Subchannel	Res.	Short name	Programming
30.1	1080i	HTV-10	Main programming

=== Analog-to-digital conversion ===
In 2010, KFOL flash-cut its digital signal into operation through the activation of a new transmitter tower located on the east side of Houma, operating at 15 kW. KJUN also activated its new transmitter facility, operating at 300 watts, near its existing site off of Highway 70. On January 20, 2014, KFOL began broadcasting all in-studio and field segments within its programming in 1080i high definition.

== See also ==
- Channel 7 digital TV stations in the United States
- Channel 10 branded TV stations in the United States
- Channel 30 digital TV stations in the United States
- Channel 30 low-power TV stations in the United States
- Channel 30 virtual TV stations in the United States
