= WWTO-TV =

Television station in Naperville, Illinois

- Naperville–Chicago, Illinois; United States
- City: Naperville, Illinois (Note: Originally licensed to LaSalle, Illinois; moved to Naperville in 2017.)
- Channels: Digital: 32 (UHF), shared with WLPD-CD; Virtual: 35

Programming
- Affiliations: 35.1: TBN; for others, see § Subchannels

Ownership
- Owner: Trinity Broadcasting Network; (Trinity Broadcasting of Texas, Inc.)
- Sister stations: WLPD-CD

History
- First air date: December 12, 1986
- Former channel numbers: Analog: 35 (UHF, 1986–2009); Digital: 10 (VHF, until 2017), 35 (UHF, 2017–2019)

Technical information
- Licensing authority: FCC
- Facility ID: 998
- ERP: 15 kW
- HAAT: 373.1 m (1,224 ft)
- Transmitter coordinates: 41°53′56.1″N 87°37′23.2″W

Links
- Public license information: Public file; LMS
- Website: www.tbn.org

WWTO-TV (channel 35) is a religious television station licensed to Naperville, Illinois, United States, serving the Chicago area. It is owned by the Trinity Broadcasting Network (TBN) alongside TBN Inspire station WLPD-CD (channel 30). Through a channel sharing agreement, the two stations transmit using WLPD-CD's spectrum from an antenna atop the John Hancock Center.

Although WWTO-TV is licensed as a full-power station, it shares spectrum with WLPD-CD, whose low-power signal only covers the immediate Chicago area. Therefore, WWTO-TV relies on cable carriage to reach the entire market.

== History ==
The first station to broadcast on UHF channel 35 licensed to LaSalle went on the air on November 7, 1957, as WEEQ, a satellite station of WEEK-TV in Peoria. WEEK and WEEQ were acquired by a company related to Kerr-McGee, but sold off after Senator Robert S. Kerr's death. The sale, approved by the Federal Communications Commission on July 13, 1966, was for $3,088,650 ($30,648,900 adjusted for inflation) and transferred the stations to Mid-America Television Co., owned by Kansas City Southern Industries. KCS shut down WEEQ-TV on August 12, 1972, citing increased cable penetration and an increase in WEEK-TV's signal strength.

=== Late 1980s ===
WWTO-TV began broadcasting operations in early December 1986 and was originally licensed to All American TV (not to be confused with an unrelated television syndication company of a similar name), owned by evangelists Nicky Cruz and Sonny Arguinzoni. The station's first chief engineer and general manager was Glen Dingley, who would oversee the building of its studios and transmitter before returning to Houston in 1990.

Until November 13, 2017, WWTO-TV's transmitter was located in Deer Park Township, LaSalle County (near Starved Rock State Park) and maintained studios on East Stevenson Road in Ottawa. From Deer Park, the station also served the Peoria and Rockford markets over-the-air.

== Technical information ==
=== Subchannels ===
Subchannels of WLPD-CD and WWTO-TV
License	Subchannel	Res.	Short name	Programming
WLPD-CD	30.1	480i	inspire	TBN Inspire
WLPD-CD	30.2	720p	TBN HD	TBN
WWTO-TV	35.1	720p	TBN HD	TBN
WWTO-TV	35.2	720p	TVDEALS	Infomercials
WWTO-TV	35.3	480i	ONTV4U	OnTV4U (infomercials) (4:3)
WWTO-TV	35.4	480i	POSITIV	Positiv

=== Former translators ===
WWTO rebroadcast its signal on translators throughout Northern and Central Illinois; however, due to financial strains endured by TBN, these translators were shut down in early 2010.

- W19CX in Sterling–Dixon (formerly W52BI; off-air as of March 29, 2010)
- W22AJ in Arlington Heights (formerly W64CQ; off-air as of April 13, 2010)
- W25CL in Rockford (off-air as of March 26, 2010)
- W29BG in Decatur (off-air as of March 25, 2010)
- W34DL in Champaign (off-air as of April 13, 2010)
- W40BY in Chicago (formerly W68DO; now WESV-LD)
- W50DD in Peoria (formerly W41BO; off-air as of March 26, 2010)
- W51CT in Bloomington (off-air as of March 28, 2010)
- W51DT in Galesburg (formerly W50BY; off-air as of April 13, 2010)

W19CX would later be sold to Luken Communications, the parent company of Retro Television Network, under the licensee name "Digital Networks - Midwest".

W22AJ would later be sold to one of the owners of KAXT-CD in San Jose, California, under the licensee name of "Chicago 22, LLC". The callsign was changed to WRJK-LP on January 18, 2013.

W34DL, W51CT and W51DT would later be donated to the Minority Media and Television Council (MMTC); however W34DL and W51CT would later be cancelled, due to inactivity for over one year. The current occupant of channel 34 in Champaign, W34EH-D, is on a new license under a different owner, while W51DT is now WSIO-LD and owned by Get After It Media, but has remained silent for nearly a decade.

W40BY would be purchased by Spanish-language broadcaster Liberman Broadcasting, the parent of Estrella TV in February 2010, giving that network a station in Chicago. The sale was completed on December 6, 2010, with the call letters changed to WESV-LD.

TBN let the licenses for W25CL, W29BG and W50DD lapse in 2013 after a failed 2012 attempt to sell those licenses to Regal Media, among many others.

== Cable carriage ==
LaSalle lies at the far western end of its nominal Chicago media market. The Federal Communications Commission (FCC) declared many communities served by Chicago-area cable systems to be outside of WWTO-TV's designated market, and denied must-carry status. In 1997 ruling in favor of Time Warner Cable, the FCC noted that "WWTO-TV has at best a minimal viewing presence in the Chicago ADI as a whole, and the communities are located approximately 65 to 70 miles from WWTO-TV. Furthermore, the station has never been carried on the cable system in question, offers no programming specifically for the relevant communities, and provides no over-the air signal coverage of the Communities." The FCC made a similar ruling in 1999 concerning dozens of cable services in McHenry, DuPage, Lake, Cook, Kane and Will counties in Illinois and Lake, Porter, LaPorte and Jasper counties in Indiana. In that order, the FCC noted that "out of the 10 counties herein, the A.C. Nielsen 1997 County/Coverage Survey does not even list WWTO-TV and for the one where it is listed, Will County, only minimal viewership is recorded." Even with the move of the station's transmitter to the John Hancock Center, Xfinity continues to source most of TBN's networks via their national feeds within the Chicago market, outside of must-carry situations where WWTO-DT1's signal must be utilized (the must-carry designation disallows TBN from asking for carriage of its subchannels).
