= KAIQ =

Radio station in Wolfforth, Texas

- Wolfforth, Texas; United States
- Broadcast area: Lubbock area
- Frequency: 95.5 MHz
- Branding: La Tricolor

Programming
- Format: Regional Mexican

Ownership
- Owner: Entravision Communications; (Entravision Holdings, LLC)
- Sister stations: Radio: KBZO; TV: KBZO-LD

History
- First air date: 1994

Technical information
- Licensing authority: FCC
- Facility ID: 111
- Class: C1
- ERP: 100,000 watts
- HAAT: 206.0 meters (675.9 ft)
- Transmitter coordinates: 33°31′3″N 101°51′24″W

Links
- Public license information: Public file; LMS
- Website: Official website

KAIQ (95.5 FM) is a radio station broadcasting a Regional Mexican format. It is licensed to Wolfforth, Texas, United States, and serves the Lubbock area. The station is owned by Entravision Communications.
