= KXJB-LD =

Television station in Horace, North Dakota

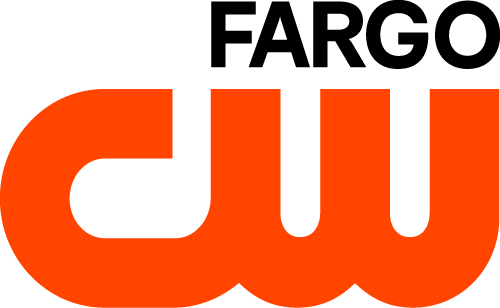
- Horace–Fargo, North Dakota; United States
- City: Horace, North Dakota
- Channels: Digital: 30 (UHF); Virtual: 30
- Branding: KX4; Valley News Live; Fargo CW (30.2)

Programming
- Affiliations: 30.1: CBS; 30.2: CW+; for others, see § Subchannels

Ownership
- Owner: Gray Media; (Gray Television Licensee, LLC)
- Sister stations: KVLY-TV

History
- First air date: September 12, 2016
- Call sign meaning: John Boler, founder of KXJB-TV

Technical information
- Licensing authority: FCC
- Facility ID: 185885
- ERP: 15 kW
- HAAT: 46.3 m (152 ft)
- Transmitter coordinates: 46°50′47″N 96°48′7″W
- Translator(s): see § Translators

Links
- Public license information: LMS
- Website: www.valleynewslive.com

KXJB-LD (channel 30) is a low-power television station licensed to Horace, North Dakota, United States, serving the Fargo–Grand Forks market as an affiliate of CBS and The CW Plus. It is owned by Gray Media alongside NBC affiliate KVLY-TV (channel 11). The two stations share studios on 21st Avenue South in Fargo, where KXJB-LD's transmitter is also located.

Due to KXJB's low-power status, its over-the-air signal only covers the immediate Fargo area. Therefore, the station's main CBS channel is simulcast in 720p high-definition on KVLY's second digital subchannel to increase its over-the-air broadcasting radius; this signal can be seen on channel 11.2 from a transmitter near Blanchard. The KVLY tower also transmits KXJB's much lower powered translator K28MA-D (licensed to Argusville), carrying all of KXJB's subchannels on channel 28, serving a rural area from Valley City to Mayville. A second translator, K30LR-D in Grand Forks, carries all of the KXJB subchannels on channel 30.

== History ==
=== Intellectual unit ===
From 1955 to 2014, the KXJB call sign and CBS affiliation operated on channel 4, under the broadcast license presently associated with KRDK-TV.

KXJB was co-owned with the KX Television network in western North Dakota from 1959 to 1971. The station never changed its network affiliation until late 2014, when Major Market Broadcasting purchased the station. CBS was also carried with Grand Forks newscasts and commercials on KXJC-LP (channel 35) as a semi-satellite of KXJB, from 2000 until the license for that station was canceled in April 2003, due to KVLY-TV taking over operations of the original KXJB.

On November 20, 2013, KXJB owner Parker Broadcasting announced the sale of its entire group to Excalibur Broadcasting. The deal was concurrent with KVLY-TV owner Hoak Media Corporation selling almost all of its stations to Gray Television; Excalibur's other stations were operated by Gray under local marketing agreements. After heightened scrutiny by the FCC over LMAs and similar agreements, Gray announced that it would acquire the non-license assets of six stations from the Hoak/Parker deal, including KXJB, move their programming to digital subchannels of existing Gray stations in the affected markets and divest their licenses to minority-owned broadcasters who would operate them independently and not enter into any LMAs or similar agreements with Gray. In the case of KXJB, its intellectual unit would be moved to KVLY's subcarrier.

On November 12, 2014, KVLY added a simulcast of KXJB on its second digital subchannel, displacing MeTV to the third subchannel. KXJB-TV signed off the air at 12 midnight CT on December 1, 2014, CBS programming continued to be available on KVLY-DT2, hence making KVLY-DT2 the sole CBS affiliate in the area. KVLY-DT2 also retained the original "KX4" branding of the original CBS affiliate. KXJB was sold to Major Market Broadcasting on December 18 of that year. Channel 4 returned to the air on January 13, 2015, as KRDK-TV, now an affiliate of multiple multi-cast networks, including Cozi TV, and later MyNetworkTV, on its main subchannel, and locally operated BEK Sports, featuring local high school sports coverage in the area, on KRDK-DT2 and in prime time on the main subchannel. Most of KRDK's other eight subchannels provide programming from various classic TV and movie networks.

=== Current license ===
Gray signed on three low power TV stations in September 2016, with the KXJB call sign and translators replicating coverage in areas with strong coverage of the previous KXJB-TV (now KRDK-TV). KXJB's CBS channel, also broadcast on KVLY 11.2, carries CBS and other programs in KXJB-TV's 1080i HD format, the second subchannel carrying The CW Plus (previously on WDAY-TV 6.2 and WDAZ-TV 8.2), and the third subchannel carrying Heroes & Icons (previously on KRDK-TV).

In October 2016, KRDK-TV requested must-carry on channel 4 (the former home of KXJB prior to December 2014). The area's pay TV providers then moved "KX4" to channel 9, though this put the channel closer to the other major affiliates on those systems, as WDAY-TV is on cable channel 6, with KVRR on channel 10 and KVLY on channel 11.

== News operation ==
KXJB produces its own newscasts on weekdays at noon, 5:30 p.m., and 6:30 p.m., with the CBS Evening News being carried at 6 p.m. instead of the normal 5:30 p.m. slot on most CBS affiliates in the Central Time Zone. The morning Valley Today, 10 p.m., and weekend newscasts are simulcast with KVLY. This combined news operation is known as Valley News Live.

On September 12, 2016, KXJB launched a prime time newscast on its CW-affiliated subchannel known as Valley News Live at 9. The half-hour broadcast offers direct competition to Fox affiliate KVRR's long established hour long newscast airing at the same time and WDAY-TV/WDAZ-TV's half-hour WDAY'Z Xtra News at 9 on its second and third subchannels, which was launched just weeks before Fargo CW's 9 p.m. newscast.

== Technical information ==
=== Subchannels ===
The station's signal is multiplexed:

Subchannels of KXJB-LD
| Channel | Res. | Short name | Programming |
|---|---|---|---|
| 30.1 | 1080i | KX4 CBS | CBS |
| 30.2 | 720p | FargoCW | The CW Plus |
| 30.3 | 480i | H and I | Heroes & Icons |
| 30.4 | 720p | KVLYNBC | NBC (KVLY-TV) |

Simulcast of subchannels of another station

=== Translators ===
- K28MA-D Argusville, ND
- K14PH-D Baudette, MN
- K30LR-D Grand Forks, ND
- K30PA-D Roseau, MN
- K34MC-D Williams, MN

== See also ==
- Channel 4 branded TV stations in the United States
- Channel 30 digital TV stations in the United States
- Channel 30 low-power TV stations in the United States
- Channel 30 virtual TV stations in the United States
