= KTVC =

Television station in Roseburg, Oregon

KTVC and KAMK-LD
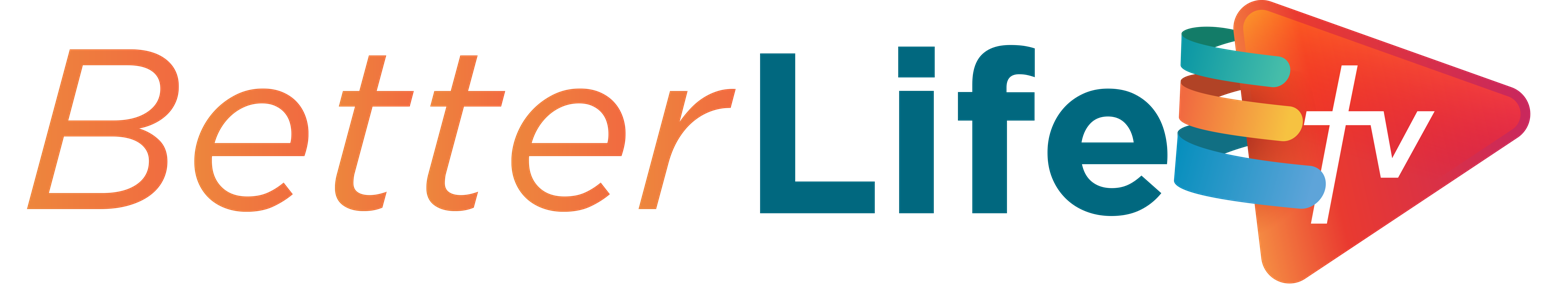

KTVC: Roseburg, Oregon; KAMK-LD: Eugene, Oregon; United States
- Channels for KTVC: Digital: 18 (UHF); Virtual: 36
- Channels for KAMK-LD: Digital: 5 (VHF); Virtual: 36
- Branding: Better Life TV

Programming
- Affiliations: 36.1: Religious Independent; for others, see § Subchannels

Ownership
- Owner: Better Life Television
- Sister stations: KBLN-TV

History
- Founded: KTVC: March 13, 1992
- First air date: KTVC: July 18, 1994; KAMK-LD: February 25, 1993
- Former call signs: KTVC: KROZ (1994–1998); KAMK-LD: K53EA (1993–1998); KAMK-LP (1998–2012)
- Former channel number: KTVC: Analog: 36 (UHF, 1994–2009); KAMK-LD: Analog: 53 (UHF, 1993–2012); Digital: 49 (UHF, 2012–2018)
- Former affiliations: KTVC: Independent (1994–1995, January−April 2009); The WB (1995–1998); Pax TV (1998–2002); UPN (2002–2006); RTN (2006–January 2009); KAMK-LD: The Box (1993–1995); The WB (1995–1998); Pax TV (1998–2002); UPN (2002–2006); RTN (2006–January 2009); Independent (January−April 2009)
- Call sign meaning: KAMK-LD: Gerald D. Kamp (former owner)

Technical information
- Licensing authority: FCC
- Facility ID: KTVC: 31437; KAMK-LD: 24009
- Class: KAMK-LD: LD
- ERP: KTVC: 50 kW; 42 kW (CP); KAMK-LD: 0.5 kW
- HAAT: KTVC: 212.8 m (698 ft); 159.3 m (523 ft) (CP); KAMK-LD: 297.7 m (977 ft)
- Transmitter coordinates: KTVC: 43°14′8.4″N 123°19′20.2″W; 43°14′7.4″N 123°22′58.3″W (CP); KAMK-LD: 44°0′9.5″N 123°6′48.6″W

Links
- Public license information: KTVC: Public file; LMS; KAMK-LD: Public file; LMS
- Website: www.betterlifetv.tv

KTVC (channel 36) is a religious independent television station in Roseburg, Oregon, United States. The station is owned by Better Life Television, based in Grants Pass, Oregon. KTVC's transmitter is located on Mount Rose northeast of Roseburg.

KAMK-LD (channel 5) in Eugene operates as a translator of KTVC; this station's transmitter is located on Blanton Road.

== History ==
The station began broadcasting on UHF channel 36 on July 18, 1994, under the call sign KROZ. It became a charter affiliate of The WB on January 11, 1995. It changed its calls to the current KTVC on September 4, 1998. 17 days later, the WB affiliation moved to cable-only KZWB, and KTVC affiliated with the then-new Pax TV.

In 2002, the station affiliated with UPN after the network moved from KEVU-LP. Under ownership of Equity Broadcasting, KTVC switched to Equity's Retro Television Network on September 16, 2006, when UPN ceased broadcasting. A newly created digital subchannel of NBC affiliate KMTR picked up The CW, a network created by the merger of UPN and The WB, while KEVU-LP became an affiliate of MyNetworkTV, a programming service from News Corporation, then-parent company of Fox.

On January 4, 2009, a contract conflict between Equity Media Holdings Corporation and RTN interrupted the programming on many RTN affiliates. As a result, Luken Communications restored a national RTN feed from its headquarters in Chattanooga, Tennessee, with individual customized feeds to non-Equity-owned affiliates to follow on a piecemeal basis. Consequently, KTVC lost its RTN affiliation immediately, though Luken vowed to find a new affiliate for RTN in the area.

KTVC was sold at auction to Better Life Television on April 16, 2009. Upon the completion of the sale, the station began to air religious programming from new sister station KBLN, including 3ABN programming.

The KTVC calls were previously used on what is now KBSD-TV in Dodge City, Kansas, from 1957 to 1989.

=== KAMK-LP history ===
KAMK-LP began as translator station K53EA on February 25, 1993, broadcasting The Box. On December 16, 1995, K53EA began rebroadcasting KROZ which would change to KTVC. On January 1, 1998, K53EA became low power KAMK-LP. Calls reflected owner Gerald D. Kamp's last name.

On January 30, 2012, KAMK-LP switched to digital as KAMK-LD (channel 49), using virtual channel 36.1, to match KTVC's virtual channel. (It is not related to KXOR-LP, a defunct Azteca América station in Eugene that broadcast on UHF channel 36, though that channel carried 3ABN programming in the past.)

== Technical information ==
=== Subchannels ===
The station's signal is multiplexed:

Subchannels of KTVC and KAMK-LD
Channel	Res.	Short name	Programming
36.1	480i	KTVC-DT	Better Life TV
36.2	480i	BLBN-2	Better Health TV
36.3	480i	BLBN-3	Nature Channel
36.4	480i	BLBN-4	Vida Mejor TV

=== Analog-to-digital conversion ===
KTVC shut down its analog signal, over UHF channel 36, on June 12, 2009, the official date on which full-power television stations in the United States transitioned from analog to digital broadcasts under federal mandate. The station's digital signal remained on its pre-transition UHF channel 18, using virtual channel 36.

== See also ==
- KBLN-TV
- Media ministries of the Seventh-day Adventist Church
