= List of television stations in Zacatecas =

The following is a list of all CRT-licensed over-the-air television stations broadcasting in the Mexican state of Zacatecas. There are 19 television stations in Zacatecas.

== List of television stations ==
RF	VC	Call sign	Location	Network/name	ERP	Concessionaire
34	1/7	XHKC-TDT	Fresnillo	Azteca Uno (Azteca 7)	9.230 kW	Televisión Azteca
22	2	XHJZT-TDT	Jalpa	Las Estrellas	25 kW	Televimex
23	2	XHNOZ-TDT	Nochistlan	Las Estrellas	32 kW	Televimex
27	1/7	XHCPZ-TDT	Sombrerete	Azteca Uno (Azteca 7)	9.13 kW	Televisión Azteca
18	2	XHSOZ-TDT	Sombrerete	Las Estrellas	32 kW	Televimex
23	5	XHSMZ-TDT	Sombrerete	Canal 5	32 kW	Radio Televisión
24	2	XHTLZ-TDT	Tlaltenango; Calvillo, Ags.	Las Estrellas	22 kW; 17 kW	Televimex
22	2	XHVAZ-TDT	Valparaiso	Las Estrellas	22 kW	Televimex
31	1	XHLVZ-TDT	Zacatecas	Azteca Uno (adn40)	40.94 kW	Televisión Azteca
16	2	XHBD-TDT	Zacatecas; Aguascalientes, Ags.	Las Estrellas (FOROtv)	130 kW; 225 kW	Televimex
27	3	XHCTZA-TDT	Zacatecas	Imagen Televisión (Excélsior TV)	92.942 kW	Cadena Tres I, S.A. de C.V.
17	5	XHBQ-TDT	Zacatecas	Canal 5	130 kW	Radio Televisión
36	7	XHIV-TDT	Zacatecas	Azteca 7 (a+)	40.76 kW	Televisión Azteca
19	9	XHZAT-TDT	Zacatecas	Nu9ve	130 kW	Teleimagen del Noroeste
15	14	XHSPRZC-TDT	Zacatecas	SPR multiplex (11.1 Canal Once, 14.1 Canal Catorce, 14.2 Ingenio Tv, 20.1 TV UNAM, 22.1 Canal 22, 45.1 Canal del Congreso)	48.99 kW	Sistema Público de Radiodifusión del Estado Mexicano
20	15	XHZAC-TDT	Zacatecas	Canal 15 Zacatecas	8.93 kW	Integración Mexicana con Visión en Zacatecas (operated by Grupo Radiofónico B-15)
24	24	XHZHZ-TDT	Zacatecas	SIZART (Once Niños)	41.9 kW	Gobierno del Estado de Zacatecas
30	30	XHZAE-TDT	Zacatecas	TeleZer	10.028 kW	Valores y Tradiciones de Mi Tierra (operated by Grupo Radiofónico ZER)
22	44	XHFZC-TDT	Zacatecas	NTR TV	10.001 kW	Fundación Cultural por Zacatecas (operated by NTR Medios de Comunicación)
