= Channel 30 TV stations in Canada =

List of TV stations

The following television stations broadcast on digital or analog channel 30 in Canada:

- CFKS-DT in Sherbrooke, Quebec
- CFTF-DT-9 in Gaspé, Quebec
- CHKL-DT-1 in Penticton, British Columbia
- CH5248 in Neepawa, Manitoba
- CIVO-DT in Gatineau, Quebec
- CKES-DT in Edmonton, Alberta
- CKWS-DT-1 in Brighton, Ontario
