= KBLN-TV =

Television station in Grants Pass, Oregon

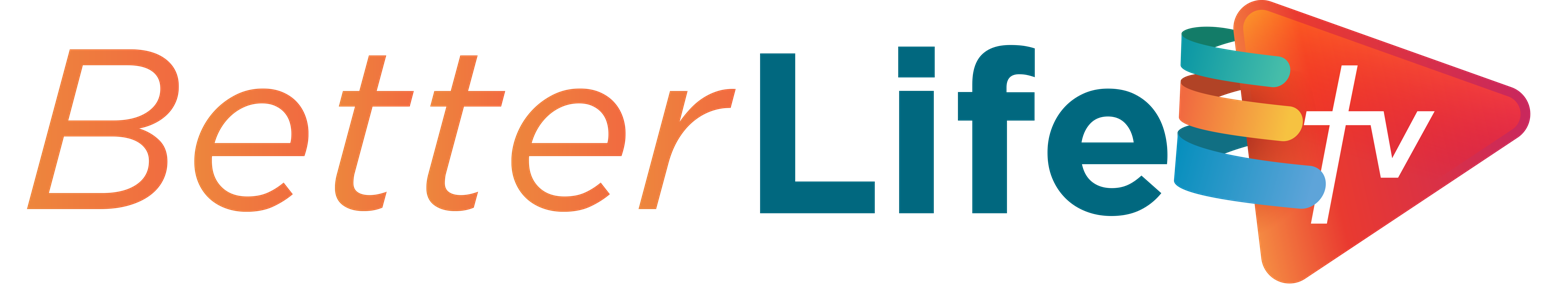
- Grants Pass–Medford, Oregon; United States
- City: Grants Pass, Oregon
- Channels: Digital: 30 (UHF); Virtual: 30
- Branding: Better Life TV

Programming
- Affiliations: 30.1: Religious Independent; for others, see § Subchannels

Ownership
- Owner: Better Life Television

History
- First air date: October 15, 2001
- Former channel numbers: Analog: 30 (UHF, 2001–2009)
- Call sign meaning: Better Life Network

Technical information
- Licensing authority: FCC
- Facility ID: 83306
- ERP: 2 kW
- HAAT: 654 m (2,146 ft)
- Transmitter coordinates: 42°22′55.4″N 123°16′33.2″W
- Translator(s): see § Translators

Links
- Public license information: Public file; LMS
- Website: www.betterlifetv.tv

KBLN-TV (channel 30) is a religious independent television station licensed to Grants Pass, Oregon, United States, serving the Medford area. Owned by Better Life Television, the station maintains studios on Northeast 9th Street in Grants Pass and a transmitter on Mount Bluey.

KBLN-TV is seen in five counties in Southern Oregon, plus Siskiyou County in northern California. It is a viewer-supported non-profit outreach organization of the Seventh-day Adventist Church, with a 501(c)(3) status.

== Technical information ==
=== Subchannels ===
The station's signal is multiplexed:

Subchannels of KBLN-TV
| Channel | Res. | Short name | Programming |
|---|---|---|---|
| 30.1 | 480i | KBLN-DT | Better Life TV |
| 30.2 | 480i | BLBN-2 | Better Health TV |
| 30.3 | 480i | BLBN-3 | Nature Channel |
| 30.4 | 480i | BLBN-4 | Vida Mejor TV |

=== Analog-to-digital conversion ===
Because it was granted an original construction permit after the FCC finalized the DTV allotment plan on April 21, 1997, the station did not receive a companion channel for a digital television station. Instead, at the end of digital TV conversion, KBLN-TV shut down its analog signal, over UHF channel 30, and "flash-cut" its digital signal into operation UHF channel 30.

=== Translators ===
- K16NK-D Cave Junction
- K17EZ-D Rogue River
- K23EX-D Medford
- K25IM-D Medford
- K25NO-D Gasquet, CA
- K31NH-D Klamath Falls
- K33GJ-D Merlin
- K33HH-D Redding, CA
- K36NY-D Yreka, CA
- KEVE-LD 36 Vancouver, WA

== Expansion ==
- In 2007, KBLN announced plans to purchase a full power station in Roseburg and a low-powered repeater station in Eugene, to expand coverage to more than 500,000 viewers in the Eugene market. In 2009, the stations, KTVC and Eugene translator KAMK-LP, were sold to KBLN during a bankruptcy auction for Equity Media Holdings. Plans for this expansion were announced by Better Life before Equity's economic woes came to light.
- In 2009, according to its website, Better Life "negotiated and signed an agreement to purchase a low power digital station in the Portland area". However, the site then failed to mention which station it was intending to purchase. It was not clear if the station was in talks with a particular station, or with many stations in the region. On March 23, 2010, the FCC granted Consent to Assignment for KEVE-LP channel 36 from Fiori Media, Inc. to the Southern Oregon Conference Assn. of Seventh-Day Adventists. KEVE-LP, at the time licensed to Longview, Washington, held a construction permit to move to the Portland area, while changing its city of license to Vancouver, Washington. The station would sign on October 24, 2010, as KEVE-LD.
- In 2011, Better Life acquired a low-powered station in Redding, California, K33HH channel 33, from the Northern California Conference Association of Seventh-Day Adventists; previously, the translator carried 3ABN programming directly via satellite. Also that year, Better Life leased a subchannel on FMI Media's KNRC-LD in Reno, Nevada, where it can be seen on subchannel 14.5.
- A chain of low-power stations owned by One Ministries, Inc. (led by KKPM-CD) simulcast KBLN's Better Life TV programming throughout Northern California.

== See also ==
- KTVC
- Media ministries of the Seventh-day Adventist Church
