= KEVU-CD =

Television station in Eugene, Oregon

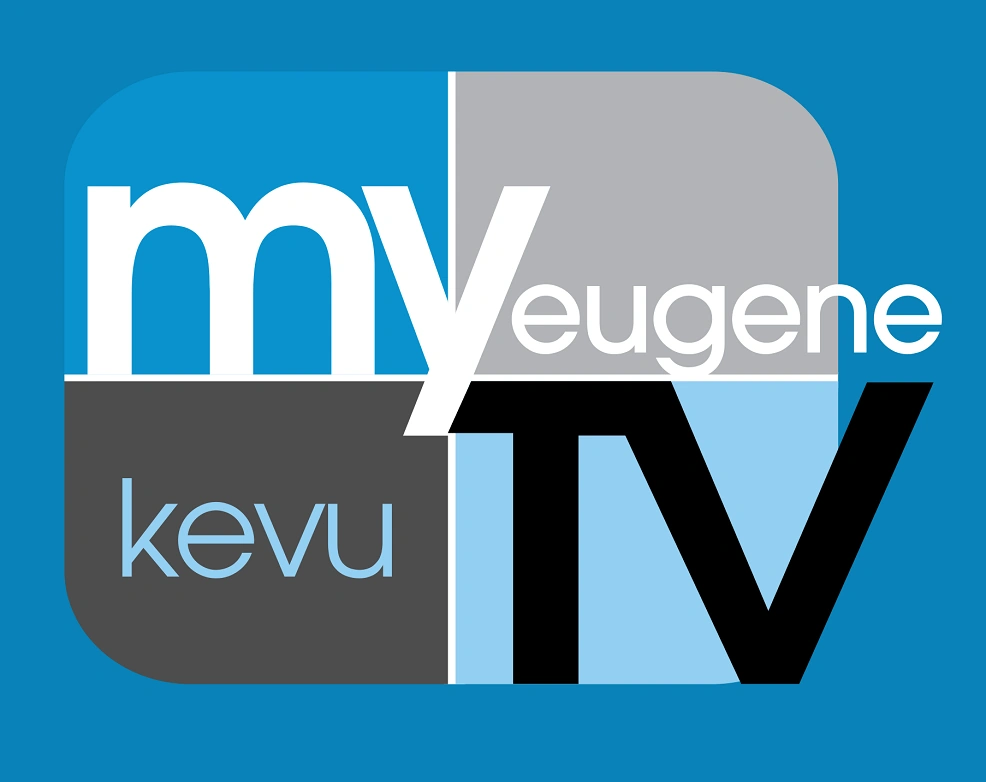
- Eugene, Oregon; United States
- Channels: Digital: 23 (UHF); Virtual: 23
- Branding: MyEugeneTV

Programming
- Affiliations: 23.1: Independent with MyNetworkTV; 23.2: Dabl

Ownership
- Owner: Cox Media Group; (Oregon Broadcasting Licenses, LLC)
- Sister stations: KLSR-TV

History
- First air date: September 30, 1991 (Note: Of KEVU as a full-service station on channel 34. This technical facility is the original K25AS/"KLSR", which began June 12, 1987.)
- Former call signs: KEVU (1991–1997); KEVU-LP (1997–2011)
- Former channel numbers: Analog: 34 (UHF, 1991–1997); 25 (UHF, 1997–2001); 23 (UHF, 2001–2010)
- Former affiliations: Independent (1991–1995, 2002–2006); UPN (1995–2002)

Technical information
- Licensing authority: FCC
- Facility ID: 8241
- Class: CD
- ERP: 7.66 kW
- HAAT: 381.3 m (1,251 ft)
- Transmitter coordinates: 44°0′3″N 123°6′49″W
- Translator(s): KLSR-TV 34.2 Eugene; for others, see § Translators

Links
- Public license information: Public file; LMS
- Website: www.oregonsfox.com/kevu.html

KEVU-CD (channel 23) is a low-power, Class A independent television station in Eugene, Oregon, United States, which has a secondary affiliation with MyNetworkTV. It is owned by Cox Media Group alongside Fox affiliate KLSR-TV (channel 34). The two stations share studios on Chad Drive in Eugene; KEVU-CD's transmitter is located on South Ridge, and it is broadcast by the higher-power KLSR-TV and its dependent translators.

KEVU traces its roots to the establishment of the full-power channel 34 facility as KEVU-TV, an independent station, on September 30, 1991. Owned by Raul Palazuelos, it broadcast from a converted house on Eugene's west side. California Oregon Broadcasting, Inc. acquired KEVU in 1994, a year after purchasing the low-power K25AS "KLSR", and switched the two stations' facilities in 1997, moving KEVU to the low-power channel 25 facility and KLSR to channel 34. KEVU was affiliated with UPN from 1995 to 2002 and has been affiliated with MyNetworkTV since its 2006 launch.

== History ==
On a petition from Sainte Broadcasting Company, the Federal Communications Commission (FCC) assigned channel 34 for commercial use in Eugene, Oregon, on March 28, 1985. In spite of Sainte starting the proceeding, the company decided not to take on the task of building another station in the market. Telecasters of Eugene Inc. a company owned by Raul and Consuelo Palazuelos, applied for the channel on July 11, 1986, and had its application granted on June 4, 1987.

KEVU began broadcasting September 30, 1991. It was the fifth commercial TV station to broadcast in the Eugene–Springfield area and was an independent station heavily dependent on counterprogramming and specialty blocks such as talk shows. It broadcast from a house on Glory Drive in west Eugene; Palazuelos lived in the house, and video tapes occupied the kitchen.

In 1994, Palazuelos sold KEVU-TV to California Oregon Broadcasting, Inc. (COBI) for $2.6 million. It was the Medford-based firm's second purchase of a Eugene television station in two years. The year before, it had acquired K25AS (known as KLSR), a low-power station that served as Eugene's Fox affiliate. COBI initially promised that the Fox affiliation would move to KEVU-TV upon approval of the transaction, but KEVU continued on channel 34 and affiliated with UPN when it launched in January 1995. It moved into KLSR's studios; station functions were consolidated with KLSR, with three technicians retaining their jobs.

On April 1, 1997, COBI moved KLSR to channel 34, which became KLSR-TV, and KEVU to the low-power channel 25 as KEVU-LP; the stations retained their existing cable numbers, only exchanging transmission facilities. That year, the station began construction on a new studio facility on Chad Drive, designed to house a news department. On November 28, 2001, the station moved from channel 25 to channel 23.

KEVU lost the UPN affiliation for Eugene to Roseburg-based KTVC (channel 36) on September 2, 2002. When UPN and The WB merged to form The CW in 2006, its affiliation went to a digital subchannel of NBC affiliate KMTR, and KEVU obtained the MyNetworkTV affiliation for Eugene.

In 2022, California Oregon Broadcasting, Inc. sold KLSR-TV and KEVU-CD to Atlanta-based Cox Media Group for $7,222,000. Under a local marketing agreement first signed in 2021, KLSR–KEVU's sales force markets the advertising time on Eugene radio station KORE (1050 AM).

== Technical information ==
=== Subchannels ===
The station's signal is multiplexed:

Subchannels of KEVU-CD
Subchannel	Res.	Short name	Programming
23.1	720p	KEVUHD	Main KEVU-CD programming
23.2	480i	DABL	Dabl

=== Translators ===
- K14MQ-D Coos Bay
- K30BN-D Coos Bay
