= KJZZ-TV =

Television station in Salt Lake City

ATSC 3.0 station
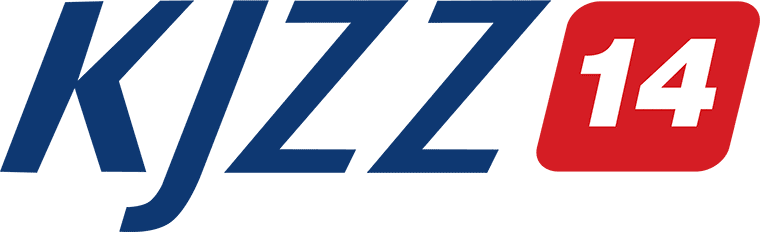
- Salt Lake City, Utah; United States
- Channels: Digital: 19 (UHF); Virtual: 14
- Branding: KJZZ 14

Programming
- Affiliations: 14.1: Independent; 14.3: Roar; 14.5: The Nest

Ownership
- Owner: Sinclair Broadcast Group; (KJZZ Licensee, LLC)
- Sister stations: KUTV, KMYU

History
- First air date: February 14, 1989
- Former call signs: KXIV (1988–1993)
- Former channel numbers: Analog: 14 (UHF, 1989–2009); Digital: 46 (UHF, 2003–2018)
- Former affiliations: UPN (1995–2000); MyNetworkTV (2006–2008)
- Call sign meaning: Formerly co-owned with the Utah Jazz

Technical information
- Licensing authority: FCC
- Facility ID: 36607
- ERP: 312 kW
- HAAT: 1,258.8 m (4,130 ft)
- Transmitter coordinates: 40°39′33″N 112°12′10″W

Links
- Public license information: Public file; LMS
- Website: kjzz.com

KJZZ-TV (Note: Typically pronounced "K"-jazz) (channel 14) is an independent television station in Salt Lake City, Utah, United States. It is owned by Sinclair Broadcast Group alongside CBS affiliate KUTV (channel 2) and fellow independent KMYU (channel 12 or 2.2) in St. George, which also airs MyNetworkTV programming. The stations share studios on South Main Street in downtown Salt Lake City; KJZZ-TV's transmitter is located on Farnsworth Peak in the Oquirrh Mountains, southwest of Salt Lake City. KJZZ-TV is the ATSC 3.0 (NextGen TV) host station for the Salt Lake City market; in turn, other stations broadcast its subchannels on its behalf.

The station went on the air as KXIV in 1989. It was the second successful attempt at an independent station for the Salt Lake City area. In 1993, Larry H. Miller, the then-owner of the Utah Jazz of the NBA, purchased the station and renamed it KJZZ-TV; it also became the new TV home of the basketball team for 16 seasons. During Miller's ownership, the station affiliated for five years with UPN, with the station's decision not to renew leading to accusations of racism against management; in the latter years, operations and programming were outsourced in turn to two other Salt Lake stations.

Sinclair purchased KJZZ-TV from the Miller family in 2016; the station airs syndicated programming and local newscasts from KUTV. In 2023, pre-season and regular season Jazz games returned to the station under a new rights agreement between current Jazz owner Ryan Smith and Sinclair.

== History ==
=== "Real TV" ===
An original construction permit was granted by the Federal Communications Commission (FCC) on December 6, 1984, to American Television of Utah, Inc., a subsidiary of Salt Lake City–based American Stores Company, for a full-power television station on UHF channel 14 to serve Salt Lake City and the surrounding area. American Stores had filed for the construction permit in 1979; its original intention for the station was to broadcast subscription television (STV) programming, as it would eventually do on a microwave distribution system known as American Home Theatre. In 1981, Skaggs Telecommunications Services, a division of American Stores, had built a studio facility to house its various divisions, including the planned television station. The construction permit took the call letters KAHT.

By the time the construction permit was awarded, however, STV had fallen out of favor. Instead, in late 1986, American reached a deal with the Grant Broadcasting System (GBS), which had started new independent television stations in Chicago, Miami, and Philadelphia, to form a joint venture which would run channel 14. The construction permit took the call letters KGBS in November 1986, the same month that the general manager of the Miami station mentioned the agreement in an interview with The Miami News. Grant, however, was headed for its own problems, filing not long after for bankruptcy reorganization. The joint venture never came to fruition; channel 14 was renamed again on February 29, 1988, to KXIV (representing the Roman numeral for 14); and American Television took up the task of building the station. Transmission tests began in January 1989 from a transmitter on Little Farnsworth Peak, and KXIV began broadcasting programming on February 14 as "Real TV", broadcasting a general entertainment lineup. "Real TV" cast itself as an alternative to the programming offered by Salt Lake's existing television stations, emphasizing classic shows.

=== K-Jazz ===
Changes elsewhere in the Salt Lake television landscape would change the future—and the name—of KXIV. KSTU, which had recently been purchased by Fox itself, was on its last season of a multi-year deal to broadcast 25 games of the NBA's Utah Jazz. Motivated by Fox's expanding offerings and the network's impending move to programming all seven nights of the week, KSTU and the Fox Television Stations Group had telegraphed to Jazz owner Larry H. Miller that it would not renew its deal, leaving the Jazz without a broadcast television partner for the 1993–94 season. As a result, Miller bought KXIV in a transaction totaling nearly $9 million, with $1.725 million going toward the license. Miller set about making channel 14 a higher-profile station centered on sports coverage, with the Jazz, the high-level minor league hockey Salt Lake Golden Eagles (which Miller also owned and who already had several games a year on channel 14), and syndicated coverage of the expansion Colorado Rockies as the nuclei. The call letters changed to KJZZ (promoted as K-Jazz 14, after the team) on June 14, after KJZZ, a radio station in Phoenix that used the base call sign, agreed to share it and after the conclusion of the NBA playoffs. Miller financed the construction of new translators to bring KJZZ's signal to outlying communities in Utah and eastern Nevada.

When he said ethnic, I don't think he meant ethnic Albanians.

— Adam Ware, COO of UPN, on the stated reasons for KJZZ's disaffiliation from the network

In November 1993, KJZZ affiliated with the upstart United Paramount Network (UPN), which began broadcasting in January 1995. The relationship would last more than five years, but changes in UPN's programming mix—which included Black-focused sitcoms on Monday and Tuesday evenings, along with WWF SmackDown on Thursdays in the peak of the boundary-pushing Attitude Era—sat uncomfortably with station management and generated a response that drew national attention. In October 2000, KJZZ opted out of its affiliation agreement, and the network announced it would move its programs to KAZG, then a small home shopping station based in Ogden, in January 2001. In explaining its rationale for the change, KJZZ station manager Randy Rigby noted that channel 14 was "uncomfortable with programming content and the lack of performance, financially, in this area" and called some of the network's programming "over the edge of cutting edge".

However, while UPN objected to network preemptions for Jazz games and KJZZ sought continued network compensation payments at a time when the network was phased out, UPN signaled another possible motive for disaffiliation. The network's chief operations officer, Adam Ware, revealed that KJZZ had sent a letter asking for an opt-out clause "should UPN increase the urban/ethnic programming above the current two hours" per week—evidently referring to UPN's Monday night lineup of programming for a predominantly Black audience, which was allegedly underperforming on its schedule. Rigby also cited the underperformance of the raunchy one-season sitcom Shasta McNasty and the single-demographically focused SmackDown as advertiser-repellent. Even before the dispute, UPN executives charged that KJZZ deemphasized UPN in its branding and rarely promoted UPN programming. In 2003, KJZZ-TV acquired the rights to the syndicated game shows Wheel of Fortune and Jeopardy!, which KTVX had dropped due to low ratings.

In 2005, KJZZ entered into a local marketing agreement (LMA) with KUTV, then owned by CBS. As a result, second runs of shows like Dr. Phil were added to the schedule, as well as newscasts from KUTV. KJZZ also affiliated with MyNetworkTV, launched by News Corporation in 2006; however, KJZZ ran the network's programming on tape delay from 11 p.m. to 1 a.m. initially (instead of the recommended 7–9 p.m. timeslot for the Mountain Time Zone), before later moving it to midnight–2 a.m.

=== Return to independence ===
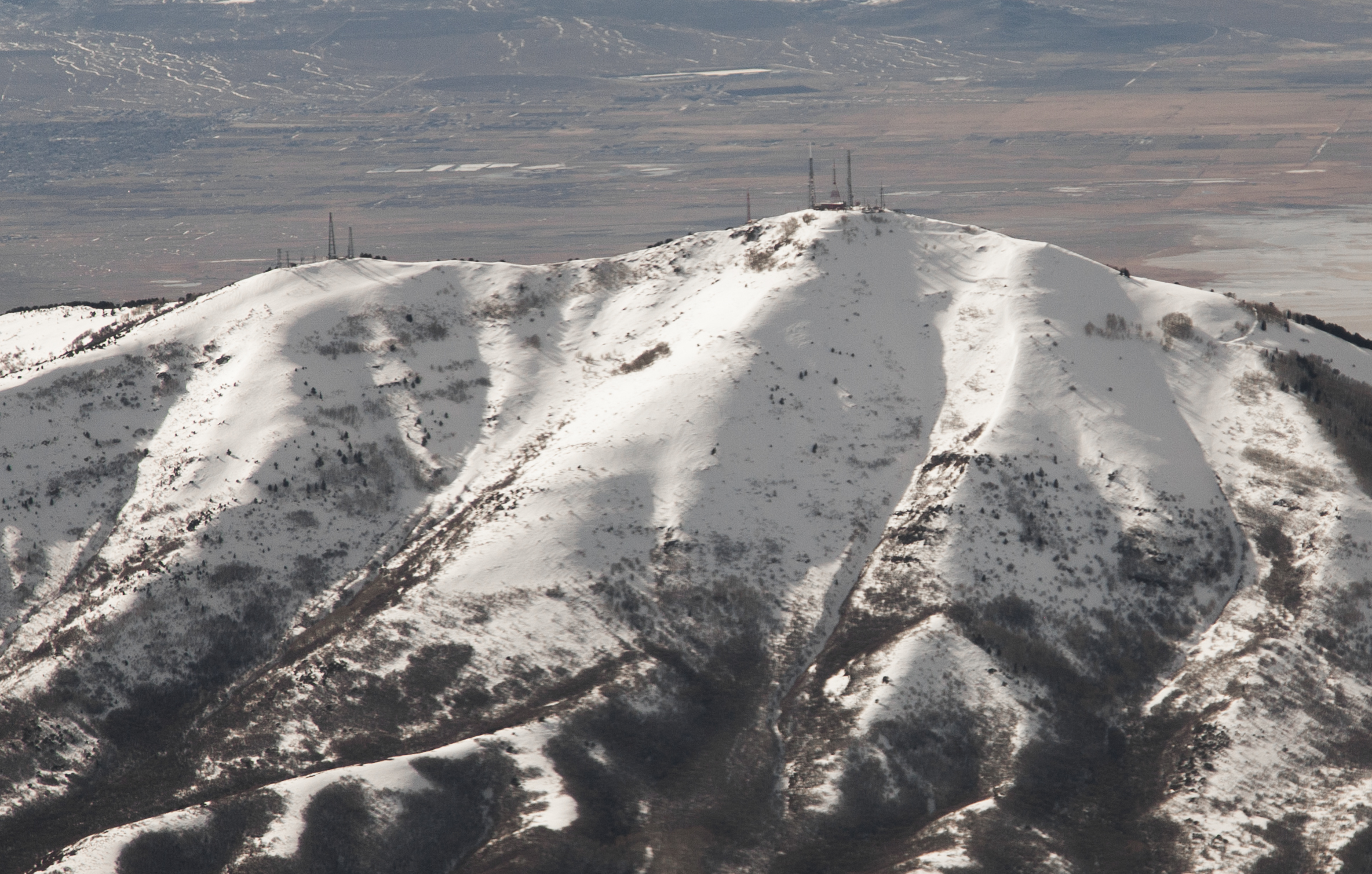
Farnsworth Peak, KJZZ-TV's transmitter site. The station signed on from Little Farnsworth Peak (the cluster of towers at left) before moving to Big Farnsworth Peak (right).

KJZZ dropped MyNetworkTV and became an independent station again on August 18, 2008. The MyNetworkTV affiliation then moved to St. George–based KCSG, which reached the Salt Lake City area via coverage on local cable television providers.

Over the course of the late 2000s, KJZZ-TV moved all operations from the original Skaggs facility west of Salt Lake City International Airport and into the EnergySolutions Arena downtown, selling off the facility in 2010. It also tried its hand at local programs such as The KJZZ Cafe and Home Team, but those efforts were axed in late 2008 due to poor viewership and revenues.

Larry H. Miller died on February 20, 2009; his son, Greg Miller, had taken over as CEO of the Larry H. Miller Group of Companies several months earlier. FCC records show a transfer of 48% ownership of the station to a trust to which Larry Miller's widow, Gail Miller, was trustee, in April 2009. Thus, Gail Miller directly owned 48% of the station, with Larry Miller's sons holding the remainder. After the LMA between KJZZ and KUTV concluded in 2010, KSL-TV owner Bonneville International began managing KJZZ under a new agreement.

On April 4, 2016, Larry H. Miller Communications Corporation agreed to sell KJZZ-TV and eight translators to Sinclair Broadcast Group for $6.5 million. The sale was completed on June 17, 2016; concurrently, the station's relationship with Bonneville and KSL-TV ended, as KJZZ had become a sister station to KUTV and KMYU.

== Local programming ==
=== Newscasts ===
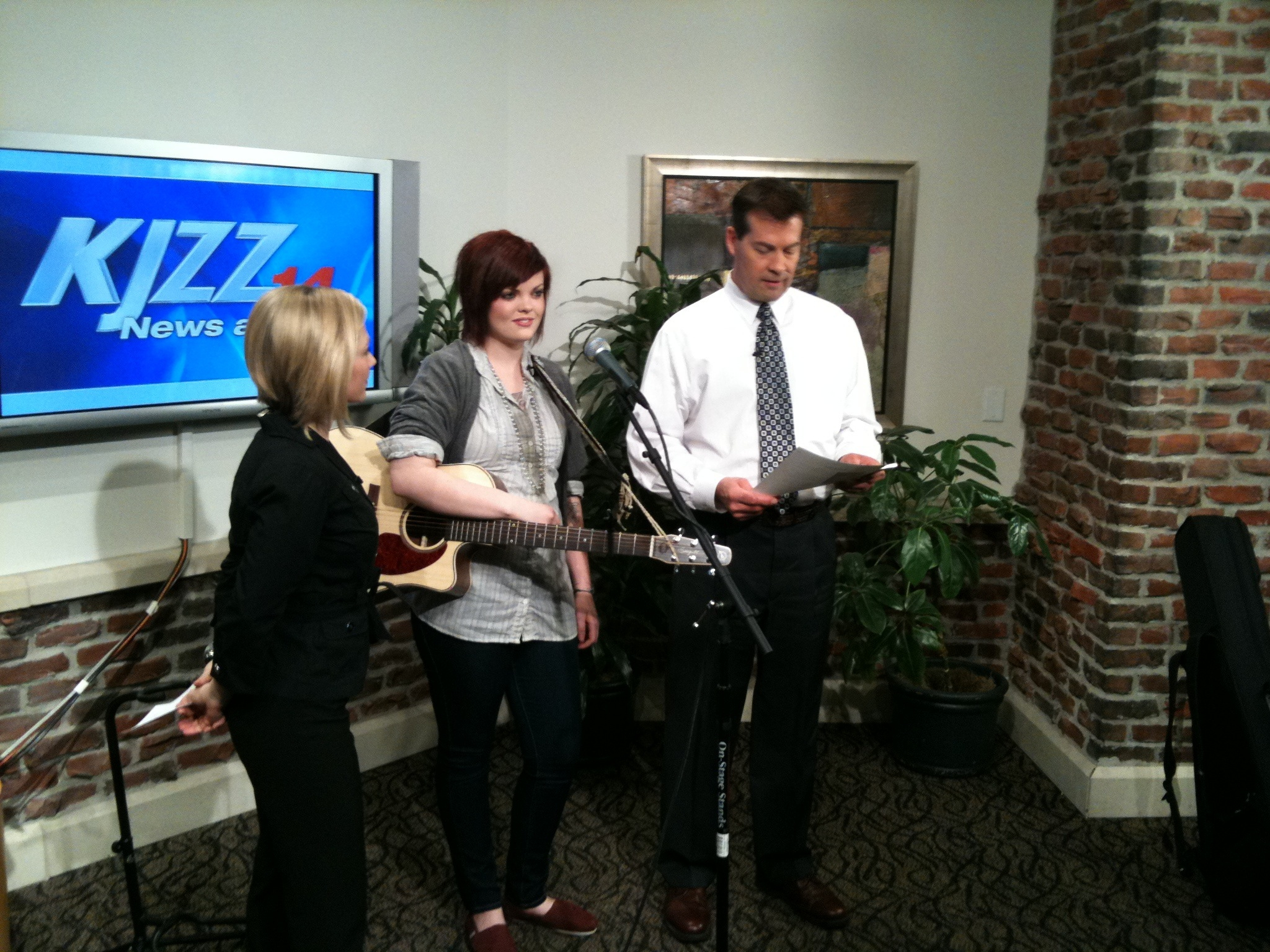
Three guests on KJZZ's morning show in 2010

The first local newscasts on channel 14 were produced under agreement with KSL-TV, in the form of a local 9 p.m. newscast that aired from October 21, 1991, to September 18, 1992. This was Salt Lake's first newscast in the timeslot, beating KSTU's news to air by more than two months, and the first news share agreement in the Mountain Time Zone; it was canceled due to low ratings.

In September 2005, KUTV began producing weekday morning 9 a.m. and nightly 9 p.m. newscasts for KJZZ-TV. The newscasts were canceled after nearly five years on May 31, 2010.

On January 9, 2017, KUTV launched the 8 a.m. hour of its morning newscast for KJZZ. The latter also added a simulcast of KMYU's 7 p.m. newscast and a revival of the 9 p.m. newscast, marking the return of the partnership between KUTV and KJZZ for the first time in nearly 7 years when the LMA broke off in 2010. The 7 a.m. hour moved from KUTV to KJZZ in 2018 when a new affiliation agreement required KUTV to clear the entirety of CBS This Morning.

=== Sports programming ===
From 1993 to 2009, KJZZ was the over-the-air broadcaster of Utah Jazz regular season NBA games. The Utah Jazz signed a new exclusive 12-year agreement with the local regional sports network (RSN), FSN Utah (later AT&T SportsNet Utah) on October 20, 2009, months after Larry H. Miller's death, ending the team's broadcasts on KJZZ-TV and making the team's telecasts cable-exclusive. At the time, the deal provided substantially more income to the team, but cord-cutting and the reticence of streaming TV providers to carry such high-priced services later made the RSN funding model untenable. The Jazz continued with AT&T SportsNet on one-year agreements for two years after the 12-year deal expired.

On June 20, 2023, with the announcement that AT&T SportsNet would wind down its operations, the team also announced a return to KJZZ-TV for the 2023–24 season, with current team owner Smith Entertainment Group starting a new in-house production division, SEG Media, to produce the telecasts. Sinclair retained the right to carry select telecasts on KUTV, and KUTV maintained an "official station" relationship with the team, allowing more coverage of the Jazz and its players. The deal also included a streaming service created by Kiswe called "Jazz+", which did not involve Sinclair or KJZZ-TV.

KJZZ-TV began a partnership with the University of Utah athletic department in 1995, broadcasting Utes men's and women's basketball games, as well as five football games a year. While the arrangement ended when the MountainWest Sports Network was formed, KJZZ had Utes football rights in the 2011 season, between the Utes leaving for the Pac-12 Conference and the 2012 establishment of the Pac-12 Network. Since 2023, KJZZ has aired select football games involving Utah State University not picked up for national television.

In 2025, KJZZ announced an agreement to air games featuring the Utah Warriors of Major League Rugby.

== Technical information and subchannels ==
KJZZ-TV is Salt Lake City's ATSC 3.0 television station, launching NextGen TV broadcasts on June 30, 2020, in association with KUTV and the Nexstar Media Group stations in the market, KTVX and KUCW; the main feeds of all four stations are carried on the ATSC 3.0 multiplex.

KJZZ-TV provides three subchannels, which are carried in ATSC 1.0 format on the multiplexes of the other stations participating in the ATSC 3.0 arrangement. It then broadcasts their main signals in 3.0 format. The KJZZ-TV transmitter is on Farnsworth Peak.

Subchannels provided by KJZZ-TV (ATSC 1.0)
Subchannel	Res.	Short name	Programming	ATSC 1.0 host
14.1	1080i	KJZZ-DT	Main KJZZ-TV programming	KUCW
14.3	480i	ROAR	Roar	KTVX
14.5	480i	Nest	The Nest	KTVX

=== ATSC 3.0 lighthouse ===
Subchannels of KJZZ-TV (ATSC 3.0)
Subchannel	Short name	Programming
2.1	KUTV	CBS (KUTV)
2.10	T2	T2
2.11	PBTV	Pickleballtv
4.1	KTVX	ABC (KTVX)
14.1	KJZZ	Main KJZZ-TV programming
30.1	KUCW	The CW (KUCW)

=== Analog-to-digital conversion ===
KJZZ-TV shut down its analog signal, over UHF channel 14, on June 12, 2009, as part of the federally mandated transition from analog to digital television. The station's digital signal remained on its pre-transition UHF channel 46 until 2018, when it relocated its signal to channel 19 as a result of the 2016 United States wireless spectrum auction.

=== Translators ===
KJZZ-TV extends its coverage throughout the entire state of Utah, plus parts of Idaho and Nevada, using an extensive network of primarily community-owned translator television stations listed below.

Note: In ATSC 1.0 format, the KJZZ subchannels are carried on translators of the three stations that host them. These translators listed KJZZ-TV or themselves as their program source as of 2022.

- Alton: K34FO-D
- Antimony: K29MB-D
- Beryl, Modena, Newcastle: K23DV-D
- Bicknell, Teasdale: K21NA-D
- Blanding/Monticello: K35NO-D
- Bluff & area: K16MP-D
- Boulder: K35NL-D
- Caineville: K35NM-D
- Cedar Canyon: K33EB-D
- Circleville: K20NB-D
- Clear Creek: K30PQ-D
- Coalville & Adj.: K31KC-D
- Duchesne: K29MW-D
- East Price: K25OZ-D
- Emery: K32JI-D
- Ferron: K27KC-D
- Fishlake Resort: K31LH-D
- Fremont: K36OH-D
- Fruitland: K20NV-D
- Garfield County: K22MM-D, K30GA-D
- Green River: K22JG-D, K29MS-D
- Hanksville: K35NC-D
- Heber City: K15LE-D
- Helper: K13AAO-D
- Henefer, Echo: K36OW-D
- Huntington: K27KE-D
- Koosharem: K21MZ-D
- Laketown, etc.: K50GA-D
- Logan: K18DL-D
- Long Valley Junction: K13AAD-D
- Manila, etc.: K29MX-D
- Marysvale: K26NW-D
- Myton: K17DM-D
- Nephi: K20OB-D
- Orangeville: K22NF-D
- Park City: K29II-D
- Price: K21EZ-D
- Randolph, Woodruff: K32MX-D
- Richfield, etc.: K21MY-D
- Roosevelt: K24NC-D
- Salina, Redmond: K06QS-D
- Samak: K30KC-D
- Scofield: K28PK-D
- Spring Glen: K36JW-D
- St. George: K24CY-D
- Summit County: K19DU-D
- Vernal: K27NO-D
- Vernal, etc.: K36IQ-D
- Washington, etc.: K34OV-D
- Woodland: K12XE-D
- Holbrook, ID: K20OF-D
- Malad City, ID: K33QF-D
- Mink Creek, ID: K04RX-D
- Montpelier, ID: K25CK-D
- Preston, ID: K23GR-D
- Soda Springs, ID: K32LX-D
- Elko, NV: K05JU-D, K19FZ-D
- Wells, NV: K22GW-D

== See also ==
- List of Salt Lake City media
