= W30FH-D =

Television station in Chamberburg, Pennsylvania

- Chambersburg, Pennsylvania; United States
- Channels: Digital: 30 (UHF); Virtual: 35

Programming
- Affiliations: see § Subchannels

Ownership
- Owner: Sonshine Family Television; (Zebra Media, LLC)
- Sister stations: WLYH

History
- First air date: August 29, 1986
- Former call signs: W40AF (1986–2003); W35BT (2003-2009); W07DP-D (2009–2020); WCZS-LD (2020–2026)
- Former channel numbers: Analog: 40 (UHF, 1986–2003), 35 (UHF, 2003–2009); Digital: 7 (VHF, 2009–2020)

Technical information
- Licensing authority: FCC
- Facility ID: 55283
- Class: LD
- ERP: 15 kW
- HAAT: 411.7 m (1,351 ft)
- Transmitter coordinates: 40°2′43″N 77°45′11″W

Links
- Public license information: LMS

W30FH-D (channel 35) is a low-power television station in Chambersburg, Pennsylvania, United States. The station is owned by Sonshine Family Television.

== History ==
The station, which first signed on the air on August 29, 1986, was a longtime Cornerstone Television station previously licensed to Harrisburg. WCZS-LD (as W07DP-D) was sold to Sonshine Family Television in 2018. In 2020, the station changed its city of license to Chambersburg and obtained a construction permit to move its transmitter to Clarks Knob, near its new city of license.

The station signed on UHF analog channel 40 on August 29, 1986, as W40AF; and then began broadcasting on channel 35 on December 8, 2003, as W35BT. The station's digital signal was inaugurated on VHF digital channel 7 on August 21, 2009, as W07DP-D; and moved to UHF digital channel 30 in 2020 as WCZS-LD.

On February 23, 2026, an FCC rule change required stations licensed as broadcast translators and not low-power TV stations, including this one, to be assigned translator-type call signs. As a result, this station was changed to W30FH-D.

== Technical information ==
=== Subchannels ===
The station's digital signal is multiplexed:

Subchannels of W30FH-D
Subchannel	Res.	Short name	Programming
27.14	720p	WHTM	ABC (WHTM-TV)
35.1	720p	Bounce	Bounce TV
35.2	720p	CourtTV	Court TV
35.3	480i	Mystery	Ion Mystery
35.4	480i	Grit	Grit
35.5	480i	H&I	Heroes & Icons
35.6	480i	Pocono	Pocono Television
49.14	720p	WLYH HD	WLYH (Religious)
49.24	480i	WLYH SD	Radiant TV (WLYH-DT2)

Simulcast of subchannels of another station

=== Analog-to-digital conversion ===
W07DP-D (as W35BT) shut down its analog signal, over UHF channel 35, on June 12, 2009, the official date on which full-power television stations in the United States transitioned from analog to digital broadcasts under federal mandate. The station's digital signal began on its pre-transition VHF channel 7, using virtual channel 35.
