= KBZO (AM) =

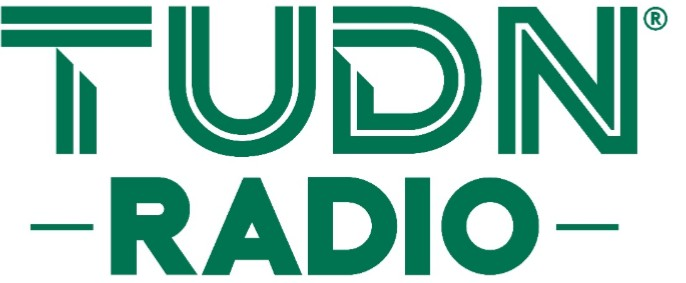
- Lubbock, Texas; United States
- Broadcast area: Lubbock
- Frequency: 1460 kHz
- Branding: TUDN Radio Lubbock

Programming
- Format: Spanish Sports
- Affiliations: TUDN Radio

Ownership
- Owner: Entravision Communications; (Entravision Holdings, LLC)
- Sister stations: Radio: KAIQ; TV: KBZO-LD

History
- Former call signs: KTLK (1983–1993); KTNP (1993–1994)

Technical information
- Licensing authority: FCC
- Facility ID: 9705
- Class: B
- Power: 1,000 watts day 243 watts night
- Transmitter coordinates: 33°32′50″N 101°49′23″W

Links
- Public license information: Public file; LMS

KBZO (1460 AM) is a radio station broadcasting a Spanish Sports format airing programming from TUDN Radio. Licensed to Lubbock, Texas, United States, the station serves the Lubbock area. The station is owned by Entravision Holdings, LLC.

== History ==
A station on 1460 was activated by a couple of ex-KSEL sales reps in 1953. Their 500-watt daytimer had studios and tower at 52nd and Magnolia in southeast Lubbock. the assigned call letters were KVSP.

In 1954, the station was sold to the McAlister and Maples interests (variously KICA Clovis, New Mexico; KGMC Englewood, Colorado; KPOS Post; and KBYG Big Spring at various times). Studios were moved into a penthouse suite of the recently completed Great Plains Life Insurance Building, a 20-floor-tall building at 12th and Avenue L (then as now the tallest building in Lubbock). The call letters were changed to KLLL for "Lubbock's Liveliest Listening". In short order, the new owners raised power to 1,000 watts, still as a daytime-only station.

KLLL (AM) was sold to the Corbin family in 1958. They purchased local FM station KBFM a decade later, and eventually changed calls from KBFM to KLLL-FM. The studio building was damaged in 1970 during the great Lubbock tornado and KLLL spent several days off air. They used the former KSEL studios on east Broadway (vacated in 1968 when KSEL moved to their new KSEL-TV sister station plant in South Lubbock). KLLL-FM returned to the air using the KSEL-TV tower. New KLLL studios were built at 1314 50th Street and were placed into use in 1976.

In 1982, KLLL was spun off to local oilman Terry Wynn. KLLL call letters stayed with the FM and the FM company purchased 1590 AM (by then KEND because it was a full-time station), and 1460 changed its format to Adult Contemporary and its call letters to KWAZ for "Kwazy Way-dio". Studios moved to 3210-B 34th Street. 1460 asked the FCC for another FM channel (class A on 106.3 which was granted) and filed for the new channel (along with many others). The grant eventually went to the now KEJS (FM) which went on air in the late 1980s.

The station received a construction permit in 1984 for a new transmitter site and new city of License of Carlisle, Texas. The new site would have required three new towers north and east of Lubbock. The site was never built. Some time later, the FCC granted day-timers use of night-time hours at appropriately reduced night powers.

KWAZ became an early medium-market all-talk station, using network programs from ABC TalkRadio, and CNN Headline News Audio. One of the engineers in this time was Kyle Wesley (now director of engineering for Radio Disney and its owned and operated broadcast stations).

The station was assigned the call sign KTLK in November 1983. On November 30, 1993, the station changed its call sign to KTNP, and on December 1, 1994, to the current KBZO. On September 8, 2019, the format flipped from Spanish sports to Norteño & Ranchera music under the moniker “José”. It has since flipped back to spanish sports with programming from TUDN Radio as of August 2020.

== Previous logo ==
KBZO Previous Logo
