= KBZO-LD =

Television station in Lubbock, Texas

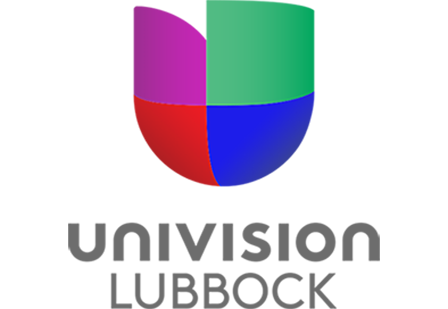
- Lubbock, Texas; United States
- Channels: Digital: 30 (UHF); Virtual: 51
- Branding: Univision Lubbock

Programming
- Affiliations: 51.1: Univision; 51.2: LATV

Ownership
- Owner: Entravision Communications; (Entravision Holdings, LLC)
- Sister stations: Radio: KAIQ, KBZO

History
- Founded: September 16, 1986
- First air date: February 28, 1989
- Former call signs: K51BX (1986–1995); KBZO-LP (1995–2012)
- Former channel numbers: Analog: 51 (UHF, 1989–2012); Digital: 51 (UHF, 2012–2018)

Technical information
- Licensing authority: FCC
- Facility ID: 51303
- Class: LD
- ERP: 15 kW
- HAAT: 201.7 m (662 ft)
- Transmitter coordinates: 33°31′33.8″N 101°52′8.6″W

Links
- Public license information: LMS
- Website: https://noticiaslubbock.com/

KBZO-LD (channel 51) is a low-power television station licensed to Lubbock, Texas, United States, affiliated with Univision. Owned by Entravision Communications, the station maintains studios on Caprock Drive in Lubbock and a transmitter located on University Avenue (at the American Tower owned KLBK/KAMC tower) just outside Loop 289.

Previous logo from 2013 to 2019.

== Subchannels ==
The station's signal is multiplexed:

Subchannels of KBZO-LD
Channel	Res.	Short name	Programming
51.1	1080i	Univisn	Univision
51.2	480i	LATV	LATV
51.88	1080i	AltaVsn	AltaVision

Subchannel broadcast with MPEG-4 video
