= KUCW =

Television station in Ogden, Utah

- Ogden–Salt Lake City, Utah; United States
- City: Ogden, Utah
- Channels: Digital: 35 (UHF); Virtual: 30
- Branding: Utah's CW 30

Programming
- Affiliations: 30.1: The CW; for others, see § Subchannels

Ownership
- Owner: Nexstar Media Group; (Nexstar Media Inc.)
- Sister stations: KTVX

History
- Founded: May 24, 1983
- First air date: October 19, 1985
- Former call signs: KOOG-TV (1983–1998); KUPX (1998); KUWB (1998–2006)
- Former channel numbers: Analog: 30 (UHF, 1985–2009); Digital: 48 (UHF, 2002–2018)
- Former affiliations: Independent (1985–1995); HSN (secondary, 1986–1996); The WB (1995–2006)
- Call sign meaning: "Utah's CW"

Technical information
- Licensing authority: FCC
- Facility ID: 1136
- ERP: 432 kW
- HAAT: 1,259.3 m (4,132 ft)
- Transmitter coordinates: 40°39′33″N 112°12′10″W
- Translator(s): see § Translators

Links
- Public license information: Public file; LMS
- Website: www.abc4.com/cw30

KUCW (channel 30) is a television station licensed to Ogden, Utah, United States, serving as the CW network outlet for Salt Lake City and the state of Utah. It is owned by Nexstar Media Group alongside ABC affiliate KTVX (channel 4). The two stations share studios on West 1700 South in Salt Lake City; KUCW's main transmitter is located atop Farnsworth Peak in the Oquirrh Mountains, extended by dozens of translators that carry its signal throughout Utah and portions of Idaho, Nevada, and Wyoming.

Channel 30 from Ogden came on air in October 1985 as KOOG-TV, an independent station owned by American Communications and Television. It struggled for its first decade-plus on the air with technical issues, some of which resulted from the transmitter being blocked from the Salt Lake Valley by terrain, and poor finances. The station curtailed its general-entertainment programming and spent most of its day broadcasting the Home Shopping Network, which paid KOOG-TV for airtime. The original ownership was sold to Trivest Financial Services in 1991, laid off most employees in 1992, and sold the station in 1994 to Alpha and Omega Communications, a subsidiary of the Salt Lake City–based Miracle Rock Church.

KOOG-TV became Utah's affiliate of The WB upon the network's launch in January 1995. Alpha and Omega agreed to sell the station to Paxson Communications Corporation in 1996; as Paxson programmed infomercials on its stations, this put The WB's future in Utah in doubt. The issue was resolved when Roberts Broadcasting and ACME Communications reached a deal to swap the construction permit for channel 16 to Paxson in exchange for operating channel 30 as a WB station. In April 1998, the new management took over; the station was renamed KUWB, and it relocated its studios and offices to Murray.

Clear Channel Communications, which at the time owned KTVX, purchased KUWB in 2006 and combined their operations. That year, The WB and UPN merged to form The CW, and KUWB became KUCW to reflect its new network affiliation. Channel 30 has been co-owned with KTVX ever since through several sales and under Nexstar ownership since 2012. It airs 7 a.m. and 7 p.m. local newscasts from the KTVX newsroom.

== History ==
=== KOOG-TV: Early history ===
The Federal Communications Commission (FCC) granted Ogden Television, Inc., a construction permit for a new television station on channel 30 in Ogden on May 25, 1983. Ogden Television was a subsidiary of American Communications and Television (AC&T) of Gainesville, Florida, which initially anticipated to put channel 30 into service as an independent station in late 1984. Instead, KOOG-TV was constructed in 1985; studios were set up on 16th Street in Ogden. After delays, KOOG-TV made a four-hour debut on October 19, 1985; its first day of broadcasting was cut short when a transmitter part burned out and had to be sent back to the factory. The station resumed again on November 1.

The new station struggled to find an audience for a variety of reasons, primarily technical and financial. Its transmitter was sited on Little Mountain, and intervening terrain blocked large areas of the Salt Lake Valley from receiving channel 30. In December 1986, this was remediated when a translator was installed atop the Beneficial Life Building in Salt Lake City, but the reputation of KOOG as a station that was hard to receive persisted. Even in Ogden, cable viewers did not have access to KOOG until July 1986; the station had threatened to sue, claiming that Tele-Communications Inc. (TCI)'s lack of carriage was inflicting "severe economic hardship" because of TCI's "absolute domination of the marketplace", which it said gave it the power to decide which stations "shall live and which shall die".

The operation also suffered from financial issues. Program director John Mason noted that management did not put enough money into promotion when channel 30 went on air. The station's attempt to present Weber State Wildcats athletic events lost money when advertiser support came in far below what had been predicted. In August 1986, film distributor Almi Pictures sued KOOG for nonpayment on a package of films. The station teetered on the brink of bankruptcy by 1987, but it survived in part thanks to the acquisition of KOOG and WTGS serving Savannah, Georgia, by Trivest Financial Services in 1991; Trivest was related to AC&T. Other factors included settlement of the lawsuits from Almi and other program suppliers and a contract with the Home Shopping Network that paid the station to broadcast home shopping programming most of the day except for afternoons and evenings. In 1992, Trivest laid off all but three employees due to a lack of advertising revenue; the remaining staff expanded their duties, with the business manager not only handling accounting but taking out the trash.

Trivest filed to sell the station to the Salt Lake City–based Miracle Rock Church in 1993, a year in which the station was placed into receivership. The FCC approved the transfer of the broadcast license to Alpha and Omega Communications, a subsidiary of Miracle Rock, in March 1994. Under Miracle Rock, KOOG-TV affiliated with The WB when the network launched in January 1995. In spite of the upgraded programming, channel 30 continued to provide poor reception to many households.

=== Paxson acquisition and station swap ===
Alpha and Omega announced in September 1996 that it would sell KOOG-TV to Paxson Communications Corporation. The transaction immediately put the future of channel 30's WB affiliation, home shopping (still aired during daytime hours), and other programming in doubt, as Paxson programmed its dozens of stations nationwide with the Infomall TV (inTV) network, consisting entirely of infomercials. At the time, KOOG-TV's contract with The WB ran through March 1997. Channel 30 continued to broadcast the network through 1997, even as Paxson prepared to move its offices from Ogden to Salt Lake City and its transmitter to Farnsworth Peak. In January 1998, KOOG-TV changed its call sign to KUPX-TV in anticipation of carrying Paxson's new Pax Net venture.

At the same time, plans were set in motion for a new station to replace channel 30 as the WB affiliate in the Salt Lake City market. In 1995, Roberts Broadcasting had acquired a construction permit for KZAR-TV (channel 16) in Provo. ACME Communications—owned by WB chief executive officer Jamie Kellner—agreed in August 1997 to acquire a 49 percent stake in KZAR-TV, with an agreement to purchase the other 51 percent once the television station was on the air; the deal closed in February 1998 and cemented channel 16's likely future as a WB affiliate. Construction was already underway to broadcast the station, renamed KUWB, from Lake Mountain near Provo.

By March 1998, Paxson entered into an agreement with Roberts Broadcasting and ACME Communications where each group would acquire the other's assets, but WB programming would remain on channel 30. To expedite the process, the parties immediately entered into local marketing agreements, whereby the stations would swap call signs and would begin to operate each other's stations until the FCC could approve the assignments of license. On the evening of April 20, channel 30 became KUWB from the existing channel 30 facility on Farnsworth Peak, while channel 16 signed on from Lake Mountain as KUPX-TV with Paxson's programming. Neither station would have studios in Utah County; channel 30 went on air from facilities in Murray, while Paxson also sought Salt Lake–area office space. Paxson continued to air its existing infomercial programming on channel 16 until Pax Net, renamed Pax, began broadcasting on August 31, 1998. The FCC approved the swap of the licenses in March 1999, and the deal closed in the third quarter of the year.

Prior to the channel swap agreement and going on air, KUWB had already acquired the rights to air Saturday Night Live in Utah. Salt Lake City's NBC affiliate, KSL-TV (channel 5), had not carried the program since becoming an affiliate of the network in 1995, citing existing local programming, SNL's content, and middling ratings. In October 1999, ACME debuted local weather updates on channel 30 as part of a strategy to keep viewers that might otherwise switch channels for a weather forecast tuned to KUWB; meteorologist Mitch English delivered forecasts as "The Love Master". English also appeared on the station's morning show, WBAM, which debuted for the 2002 Winter Olympics in Salt Lake City and utilized radio disc jockeys from KZHT as hosts. In August 2002, English departed KUWB for the syndicated morning show The Daily Buzz, which aired on channel 30.

=== Ownership with KTVX ===
Clear Channel Communications, owner of Salt Lake City ABC affiliate KTVX (channel 4), announced the $18.5 million acquisition of KUWB in August 2005; at the time, ACME was selling stations to improve its finances. Clear Channel owned seven radio stations in the Salt Lake City market at the time of the purchase and had to divest one of them in order to acquire KUWB, electing to sell KALL to UT Radio Acquisition LLC—a company controlled by Dave Checketts—in February 2006.

While the sale was pending, The WB and UPN announced their merger into The CW effective in September 2006. KUWB's sale to Clear Channel became contingent on the ability of the station to secure the CW affiliation. Clear Channel assumed control of KUWB on April 4, 2006, and announced it would become the CW affiliate in Utah. With the sale, KUWB moved into KTVX's studios on 1700 South in Salt Lake City. To reflect the CW affiliation, KUWB became KUCW.

The Clear Channel acquisition was the first of three sales in a three-year period for KUCW. In November 2006, Clear Channel was sold and announced its intention to exit small-market radio and its 42-station television division; Newport Television, a broadcast holding company operated by Providence Equity Partners, agreed to acquire the stations in 2007. KUCW and five other stations were sold to separate ownership—High Plains Broadcasting—to avoid attribution issues with Providence's stake in Univision Communications, even though Newport continued to control the station via joint sales and shared services agreements. The sale closed on September 15, 2008. In 2009, KUCW entered into a four-year agreement to telecast Utah State Aggies athletics, including football and men's and women's basketball. KSL-TV began airing Saturday Night Live in 2013, ending its 15-year run on channel 30.

Newport broke itself up in 2012, with KTVX and KUCW being acquired by Nexstar Broadcasting Group. Nexstar acquired Tribune Media, owner of Salt Lake City Fox affiliate KSTU, in 2019; it chose to keep KTVX and KUCW, divesting KSTU to the E. W. Scripps Company.

== Newscasts ==
In 2010, KTVX debuted a 9 p.m. newscast on KUCW, which was canceled in December 2011 due to low ratings but later revived. KUCW resumed airing a 7 a.m. hour of Good Morning Utah in 2021; at the same time, the 9 p.m. news moved to 7 p.m., becoming a full hour.

== Technical information ==
=== Subchannels ===
KUCW's main transmitter is located atop Farnsworth Peak in the Oquirrh Mountains. The station's signal is multiplexed:

Subchannels of KUCW
Subchannel	Res.	Short name	Programming
30.1	720p	KUCW	The CW
30.2	480i	Mystery	Ion Mystery
30.3	480i	Defy	Defy
30.4	480i	Shop-LC	Shop LC
14.1	1080i	KJZZ-HD	KJZZ-TV (Independent)

Broadcast on behalf of another station

=== Analog-to-digital conversion ===
On April 3, 1997, the FCC adopted its Sixth Report and Order establishing digital television service allotments. Channel 29 was assigned to Ogden for use by KOOG-TV and channel 17 to Provo for use by KZAR-TV, but the Roberts and ACME–Paxson swap arrangement provided for channel 17 to be transferred to the Ogden license. In July 1999, a consortium of KUWB and seven other area stations, collectively known as DTV Utah, proposed significant changes to the Salt Lake City–market DTV allocations, including moving KUWB-DT from channel 17 to channel 48. KUWB-DT came into service on February 1, 2002.

KUCW shut down its analog signal, over UHF channel 30, on June 12, 2009, as part of the federally mandated transition from analog to digital television; the station's digital signal remained on its pre-transition UHF channel 48, using virtual channel 30. On September 9, 2018, KUCW moved from channel 48 to channel 35 as a result of the 2016 United States wireless spectrum auction.

=== Translators ===
KUCW is additionally rebroadcast over a network of low-power digital translator stations throughout Utah, plus parts of Idaho, Nevada, and Wyoming:

- Blanding–Monticello: K34OO-D
- Bloomington: K22PH-D
- Clear Creek: K27NY-D
- Coalville and Adj. A: K32IT-D
- Delta–Oak City: K28PD-D
- Duchesne: K27NP-D
- East Price: K27NW-D
- Emery: K30KH-D
- Ferron: K29IY-D
- Fillmore: K32JW-D
- Fountain Green: K36MI-D
- Garrison, etc.: K32NE-D
- Green River: K24IN-D, K27NU-D
- Heber–Midway: K26IK-D
- Helper: K27NQ-D
- Hemefer–Echo: K29FY-D
- Huntington: K29IZ-D
- Huntsville: K19LR-D
- Leamington: K17NN-D
- Logan: K13AAK-D
- Manila: K28PT-D
- Manti–Ephraim: K36OI-D
- Mayfield: K22IX-D
- Montezuma Creek–Aneth: K21IX-D
- Myton: K14LW-D
- Mount Pleasant: K17JD-D
- Nephi: K25NN-D
- Orangeville: K24ND-D
- Park City: K33FY-D
- Peoa–Oakley: K29MF-D
- Price: K28PG-D
- Randolph: K29MY-D
- Richfield, etc.: K22MP-D
- Rural Beaver, etc.: K27NJ-D
- Rural Summit County: K18KO-D
- Salina: K05NF-D
- Roosevelt: K26OF-D
- Samak: K36OX-D
- Santa Clara: K33PC-D
- Scofield: K27NV-D
- Scipio: K14RN-D
- Spring Glen: K20NP-D
- Vernal: K28PF-D
- Wanship: K30KE-D
- Soda Springs, ID: K33HO-D
- Battle Mountain, NV: K11IY-D
- Elko, NV (Grindstone Mtn.): K28PJ-D
- Elko, NV (Lamoille Summit): K34HE-D
- Wells, NV: K26JB-D
- Evanston, WY: K27KV-D
- Lyman, WY: K31FW-D
