= WLFT-CD =

Television station in Baker, Louisiana

- Baker–Baton Rouge, Louisiana; United States
- City: Baker, Louisiana
- Channels: Digital: 30 (UHF); Virtual: 30

Programming
- Affiliations: 30.1: SonLife; 30.2: Telemundo

Ownership
- Owner: Family Worship Center Church, Inc.

History
- Founded: August 19, 1998
- First air date: August 31, 1998 (as a cable channel); 2005 (over the air)
- Former call signs: K52CQ (1989–1998); WLFT-LP (1998–2003); WLFT-CA (2003–2011)
- Former channel numbers: Analog: 52 (UHF, 1998–2005), 30 (UHF, 2005–2011)
- Former affiliations: Pax (1998–2002); FamilyNet (2002–2011); MeTV, Independent (primary); Soul of the South (secondary); NewsNet (tertiary) (2011–2021)
- Call sign meaning: Lifeline Family Television; Louisiana Family Television; Local Free TV; Live Festival Television

Technical information
- Licensing authority: FCC
- Facility ID: 8653
- Class: CD
- ERP: 11.76 kW
- HAAT: 144.8 m (475 ft)
- Transmitter coordinates: 30°22′50.4″N 91°3′16.5″W
- Translator(s): KGLA-DT 42.4 (35.6 UHF) New Orleans

Links
- Public license information: Public file; LMS

WLFT-CD (channel 30) is a low-power, Class A religious television station licensed to Baker, Louisiana, United States, serving the Baton Rouge area as the flagship station of the SonLife Broadcasting Network. The station is owned by Family Worship Center Church, and has its transmitter on Honore Lane southeast of Baton Rouge.

== History ==
WLFT started as channel 4 on Cox Cable, with programming from the Pax network, in 1998. It also broadcast local religious programming on cable channel 17 and over the air on channel 52, as "WLFT/2". It was originally launched by the Bethany World Prayer Center through its subsidiary Touch Family Broadcasting, and the call sign originally stood for "Lifeline Family Television" after Bethany's flagship program. Other call acronyms used during the era of Touch Family Broadcasting included "Louisiana Family Television" and later "Local Free TV" until 2019 when it stopped using a slogan in its callsign.

In 2002, WLFT converted to all-religious programming and Pax was moved to cable channel 14 (and later to 70), as a direct network feed. The station also aired some programming from FamilyNet. In November of that year, WLFT-CA launched its new 500-foot (150 m) tower on channel 52, allowing the station to increase its broadcast range and reach more homes in communities like Hammond, Gonzales, New Roads, and St. Francisville. It remained on channel 52 until fall 2005 when it relocated to channel 30.

In July 2011, the station converted to digital and began to carry programming from MeTV during the late afternoon through early morning hours while airing local and religious-based programming at other hours. In the fall of 2011, the station launched a second HD subchannel, 30.2, which carried MeTV's entire lineup.

WLFT launched a third subchannel on October 3, 2012, which carried Zuus Country (now The Country Network). One year later, on October 2, 2013, Zuus Country was removed in favor of TV Scout. TV Scout was removed in July 2014 in favor of GetTV, which remained on subchannel 30.3 before being replaced with the Home Shopping Network on July 1, 2017. On January 1, 2019, HSN was removed, and WLFT became a charter affiliate for NewsNet, airing the network on this subchannel.

In August 2013, the station added the African-American centered Soul of the South Network to its fourth subchannel. On September 14, 2016, WLFT brought Antenna TV programming to Baton Rouge on channel 30.4. During the 2010s, only the main channel, 30.1, was carried by local cable providers.

By 2018, channel 30.1 (Cox 117) began carrying more original, local programming, especially a Thursday night lineup of original shows: A Better Life, Black & White, Let's Talk About Dogs, Kel's Cars and Colorado Xtreme. On June 28, 2021, WLFT lost its MeTV affiliation to a subchannel of MyNetworkTV affiliate WBXH, and so it moved its Antenna TV affiliation to its main channel, took channel 30.2 dark, and duplicated Antenna TV feed on 30.3 full time, and shifted its NewsNet feed to 30.4.

On September 22, 2021, Touch Family Broadcasting sold the station to Red Stick Broadcasting, owned by WLFT station manager Michael Fry and Kerry Denny. When this happened, Antenna TV disappeared from the station's main feed with its primary feed reverted to channel 30.4, Newsnet was moved back to 30.3, and the main channel aired a mixture of movies from Soul of the South Network, independent films produced and/or filmed in Louisiana, and other local and syndicated programming, including NewsNet during the morning. Red Stick Broadcasting also branded WLFT as "Live Festival Television," providing coverage of numerous festivals, parades, tailgate parties, and other events throughout South Louisiana. On November 1, 2021, WLFT simulcast its main feed in standard definition on the fourth subchannel of New Orleans Telemundo affiliate KGLA, and it brought Telemundo programming to Baton Rouge for the first time by airing a standard definition simulcast (later upgraded to high definition in April 2022) of KGLA on subchannel 30.2.

On October 3, 2022, Michael Fry filed an application with the FCC to sell WLFT to Jimmy Swaggart's Family Worship Center, locally based in Baton Rouge. The FCC granted this license transfer on November 15, 2022. On December 5, 2022, WLFT's main channel began simulcasting Sonlife Broadcasting Network's programming. In late January 2023, Family Worship Center turned channels 30.3 (NewsNet) and 30.4 (Antenna TV) dark, leaving only the main Sonlife feed on 30.1 and the rebroadcast of KGLA on channel 30.2. Antenna TV would return to Baton Rouge on March 1, 2023, when network owner Nexstar launched the network on WVLA-TV's fourth subchannel.

== Subchannels ==
The station's digital signal is multiplexed:

Subchannels of WLFT-CD
Channel	Res.	Short name	Programming
30.1	720p	WLFT-CD	SonLife
30.2	480i	ME-TV	Telemundo (KGLA-DT)
30.3	480i	Newsnet	[Blank]

Simulcast of subchannels of another station
