= WLPD-CD =

Television station in Plano, Illinois

- Plano–Chicago, Illinois; United States
- City: Plano, Illinois
- Channels: Digital: 32 (UHF), shared with WWTO-TV; Virtual: 30

Programming
- Affiliations: 30.1: TBN Inspire

Ownership
- Owner: Trinity Broadcasting Network; (Trinity Broadcasting of Texas, Inc.)
- Sister stations: WWTO-TV

History
- Founded: June 30, 1988
- Former call signs: WLPD-LP: W30AL (1988–1997); WSPY-LP (1997–2013); WLPD-CD: WSPY-LD (2011–2013); WSPY-CD (2013)
- Former affiliations: AIN (secondary); America One/Youtoo TV
- Call sign meaning: LocusPoint Digital (station's owner, 2013–2018)

Technical information
- Licensing authority: FCC
- Facility ID: 189058
- Class: CD
- ERP: 15 kW
- HAAT: 373.1 m (1,224 ft)
- Transmitter coordinates: 41°53′56.1″N 87°37′23.2″W

Links
- Public license information: Public file; LMS

WLPD-CD (channel 30) is a low-power, Class A religious television station licensed to Plano, Illinois, United States. Owned by the Trinity Broadcasting Network, the station carries its digital multicast network TBN Inspire. WLPD-CD is sister to Naperville-licensed TBN station WWTO-TV (channel 35); through a channel sharing agreement, the two stations transmit using WLPD-CD's spectrum from an antenna atop the John Hancock Center.

== History ==
WLPD-CD was founded June 30, 1988, as W30AL, a sister station of WSPY-FM (107.1). It used to simulcast on former sister station W24AJ (channel 24) in Aurora, before it was sold to Polnet in the summer of 2009. In the 2011 edition of the Sandwich Fair Times, they stated that they would sign on "DTV 35" in November 2011, with two additional subchannels yet to be determined, with "twice the amount of power as before".

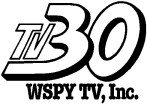
Former logo as WSPY-LP

The station was sold to LocusPoint Networks for $6 million on May 10, 2013. It was then sold to TBN in late January 2018 for $13 million; LocusPoint had already established a channel sharing agreement with TBN, which moved its WWTO-TV (then licensed to La Salle) onto the space in November 2017. In October 2019, the station switched from channel 35 to channel 32.

== Subchannels ==
Subchannels of WLPD-CD and WWTO-TV
| License | Subchannel | Res. | Short name | Programming |
|---|---|---|---|---|
| WLPD-CD | 30.1 | 480i | inspire | TBN Inspire |
| WLPD-CD | 30.2 | 720p | TBN HD | TBN |
| WWTO-TV | 35.1 | 720p | TBN HD | TBN |
| WWTO-TV | 35.2 | 720p | TVDEALS | Infomercials |
| WWTO-TV | 35.3 | 480i | ONTV4U | OnTV4U (infomercials) (4:3) |
| WWTO-TV | 35.4 | 480i | POSITIV | Positiv |
