= WAWW-LD =

Television station in Rochester, New York

- Rochester, New York; United States
- Channels: Digital: 30 (UHF); Virtual: 20

Programming
- Affiliations: see § Subchannels

Ownership
- Owner: Squirrel Broadcasting, LLC

History
- First air date: April 20, 1990
- Former call signs: W38AW (1990–1995); WAWW-LP (1995–2021)
- Former channel number: Analog: 38 (1990–2004), 20 (2005–2021)

Technical information
- Licensing authority: FCC
- Facility ID: 27573
- Class: LD
- ERP: 15 kW
- HAAT: 105.6 m (346.5 ft)
- Transmitter coordinates: 43°8′7″N 77°35′6″W

Links
- Public license information: LMS

WAWW-LD (channel 20) is a low-power television station in Rochester, New York, United States. The station is owned by Squirrel Broadcasting, LLC, a joint venture of James Smisloff and New York radio and TV station owner Craig Fox. Its main subchannel broadcasts HSN.

== History ==
Hometown Vision, Inc., received a construction permit on July 31, 1989, to build a new low-power TV station on channel 38 in Rochester with call sign W38AW. Construction began by year's end on the new station's studios on Monroe Avenue. Test broadcasts began April 20, 1990, with All News Channel as a primary program source and the station filling the last 30 minutes of each hour with local and national syndicated shows. The station's fare also included dubbed South American soap operas, 1920s movies, and professional wrestling. Programming from HSN began to appear on W38AW in 1994.

In 1995, Hometown Vision sold W38AW for $125,000 to Kaleidoscope Affiliates of Little Rock, Arkansas. Kaleidoscope owned a service known as "America's Disability Channel", which channel 38 began to air as Kaleidoscope's 16th such station; the service included programs with audio description for the visually impaired and closed captioning for the hearing impaired. The call letters were changed to WAWW-LP in December 1995, when the Federal Communications Commission (FCC) permitted the use of conventional four-letter call signs by low-power television stations. Kaleidoscope Affiliates changed its name in 1998 to Equity Broadcasting Corporation. Equity then sold WAWW-LP to Venture Technologies Group in January 2002.

After moving to channel 20 in 2005 due to displacement by the digital facility of WKBW-TV in Buffalo, Squirrel acquired WAWW-LP from Venture for $10,000. It continued to broadcast in analog until the final shut-off date for low-power stations in the United States, July 13, 2021, and resumed broadcasting in digital for the first time by the start of December.

== Subchannels ==
The station's signal is multiplexed:

Subchannels of WAWW-LD
Subchannel	Res.	Short name	Programming
20.1	720p	WAWW-LD	HSN
20.2	480i	Story	Story Television
20.3	480i	MVSGLD	MovieSphere Gold
20.4	480i	CTVN	Cornerstone (4:3)
