= WFNO (AM) =

Coordinates: 29°53′15″N 90°05′03″W

Gretna, Louisiana; United States
- Broadcast area: New Orleans metropolitan area
- Frequency: 1540 kHz
- Branding: Latino Mix 97.5

Programming
- Language: Spanish
- Format: Hot adult contemporary

Ownership
- Owner: Crocodile Broadcasting
- Sister stations: KGLA

History
- First air date: January 31, 1969 (first license granted)
- Former call signs: KGLA (1969–2019)

Technical information
- Licensing authority: FCC
- Facility ID: 14538
- Class: D
- Power: 1,000 watts day
- Translator(s): 97.5 K248BB (New Orleans)

Links
- Public license information: Public file; LMS
- Website: latinomix975.com

WFNO (1540 kHz) is a commercial AM radio station licensed to Gretna, Louisiana, and serving the New Orleans metropolitan area. The station is owned by Crocodile Broadcasting and airs a Spanish-language hot adult contemporary radio format.

The transmitter is on Industry Street in Harvey, Louisiana. By day, WFNO broadcasts at 1,000 watts, using a non-directional antenna. Because AM 1540 is a clear channel frequency reserved for Class A stations KXEL in Waterloo, Iowa, and ZNS-1 in Nassau, Bahamas, WFNO is a daytimer, required to be off the air at night to avoid interference, when radio waves travel farther. Programming is also heard on a 250 watt FM translator in New Orleans. 97.5 K248BB can be heard around the clock, unlike the AM station.

== FM translator ==
WFNO relays its programming to an FM translator. This provides the ability to broadcast WFNO programming around the clock, in high fidelity stereophonic sound. An unusual twist is that the translator's call sign begins with a "K" while the main station's call letters, WFNO, begin with a "W". The Mississippi River is the dividing line in most cases between K and W call signs. Because the river twists through the middle of Louisiana, the K-W dividing line is not clearly defined in the state.

Broadcast translator for WFNO
| Call sign | Frequency | City of license | FID | ERP (W) | Class | FCC info |
|---|---|---|---|---|---|---|
| K248BB | 97.5 FM | New Orleans, Louisiana | 147937 | 250 | D | LMS |

== History ==
As KGLA, the station was a Top 40 station prior to its flip to Spanish-language programming in the 1970s. They are also New Orleans' first and oldest Spanish outlet. Initially called Radio Mil, it served as a much-needed link for the growing Hispanic community. The founders of KGLA's Spanish-language programming were Luis Alberto Carrillo of Costa Rica and Julio Guichard, from Cuba. Guichard is no longer involved with the station but has maintained local media presence. Carrillo moved out of New Orleans several years ago, to elevate and expand in Los Angeles, California.

The station has remained faithfully committed to serve the New Orleanian community's interests even while successfully transforming itself into a viable enterprise. It was acquired by a family consortium in the 1980s headed by entrepreneur Ernesto Schweikert. KGLA has been awarded all sorts of accolades after its prompt recovery from Hurricane Katrina, reportedly using a small gasoline-powered generator to broadcast emergency messages for those who had no other means of communications in the first few days following the storm.

Former logo

KGLA swapped call signs and formats with sister station WFNO on August 1, 2019.
