= Channel 36 low-power TV stations in the United States =

The following low-power television stations broadcast on digital or analog channel 36 in the United States:

- K36AB-D in Lawton, Oklahoma
- K36AC-D in Yuma, Colorado
- K36AE-D in Clarkdale, Arizona
- K36AI-D in Parowan/Enoch, etc., Utah
- K36AK-D in Blanding/Monticello, Utah
- K36BA-D in Burns, Oregon
- K36BQ-D in Pahrump, Nevada
- K36BW-D in Thompson Falls, Montana
- K36BX-D in Coos Bay, Oregon
- K36CA-D in Memphis, Texas
- K36CC-D in Tulia, Texas
- K36CW-D in Dodson, Montana
- K36CX-D in Boulder, Montana
- K36DB-CD in Avon/Vail, Colorado
- K36DI-D in Santa Rosa, New Mexico
- K36DK-D in Joplin, Montana
- K36DP-D in Pendleton, Oregon
- K36EW-D in College Place, Washington
- K36FF-D in Shurz, Nevada
- K36FG-D in Hood River, etc., Oregon
- K36FM-D in Beaver, etc., Utah
- K36FQ-D in Wagon Mound, New Mexico
- K36FS-D in Randolph, Utah
- K36FT-D in Santa Clara, etc., Utah
- K36FZ-D in Meadview, Arizona
- K36GJ-D in Agana, Guam
- K36GL-D in Lovelock, Nevada
- K36GQ-D in Parlin, Colorado
- K36GU-D in Rockaway Beach, Oregon
- K36GX-D in Basalt, Colorado
- K36HA-D in Elko, Nevada
- K36HH-D in Susanville, etc., California
- K36HM-D in Fort Dick, California
- K36IB-D in Midland, etc., Oregon
- K36IF-D in Orangeville, Utah
- K36IG-D in Antimony, Utah
- K36IH-D in Ignacio, Colorado
- K36II-D in Joplin, Missouri
- K36IJ-D in Anahola, etc., Hawaii
- K36IK-D in Delta, Oak City, etc., Utah
- K36IL-D in Hanna & Tabiona, Utah
- K36IM-D in Duchesne, etc., Utah
- K36IO-D in Manhattan, Kansas
- K36IQ-D in Vernal, etc., Utah
- K36IR-D in Garrison, etc., Utah
- K36IY-D in Weatherford, Oklahoma
- K36JB-D in Cripple Creek, Colorado
- K36JD-D in Jackson, Wyoming
- K36JH-D in Barstow, California
- K36JO-D in Cheyenne, Wyoming
- K36JS-D in Grants, New Mexico
- K36JT-D in Clear Creek, Utah
- K36JV-D in East Price, Utah
- K36JW-D in Spring Glen, Utah
- K36JX-D in Many Farms, Arizona
- K36JZ-D in Roseburg, Oregon
- K36KD-D in Tierra Amarilla, New Mexico
- K36KE-D in Ardmore, Oklahoma
- K36KH-D in Alexandria, Minnesota
- K36KI-D in Fillmore, etc., Utah
- K36KN-D in Eureka, Nevada
- K36KR-D in Elmo/Big Arm, Montana
- K36KW-D in Redwood Falls, Minnesota
- K36KZ-D in Max, Minnesota
- K36LA-D in Kabetogama, Minnesota
- K36LB-D in Cheyenne Wells, Colorado
- K36LD-D in College Station, Texas
- K36LE-D in Manila, etc., Utah
- K36LF-D in Taos, New Mexico
- K36LU-D in Ely, Nevada
- K36LW-D in Williams, Minnesota
- K36LX-D in Jacks Cabin, Colorado
- K36LZ-D in Garden Valley, Idaho
- K36MI-D in Fountain Green, Utah
- K36MU-D in Texarkana, Arkansas
- K36NB-D in Carson City, Nevada
- K36ND-D in Victoria, Texas
- K36NE-D in Las Vegas, Nevada
- K36NL-D in Cottage Grove, Oregon
- K36NN-D in West Plains, Missouri
- K36NO-D in Alton, etc., Utah
- K36NP-D in Baker Valley, Oregon
- K36NQ-D in Altus, Oklahoma
- K36NR-D in Seiling, Oklahoma
- K36NV-D in Strong City, Oklahoma
- K36NW-D in Aberdeen, South Dakota
- K36NX-D in Pringle, South Dakota
- K36NY-D in Yreka, California
- K36NZ-D in Clarkston, Washington
- K36OA-D in Red Lake, Minnesota
- K36OB-D in Verdi, Nevada
- K36OC-D in Fort Peck, Montana
- K36OD-D in North La Pine, Oregon
- K36OE-D in Garfield County, Utah
- K36OF-D in Ursine, Nevada
- K36OG-D in Bend, Oregon
- K36OH-D in Fremont, Utah
- K36OI-D in Manti/Ephraim, Utah
- K36OJ-D in Rainier, Oregon
- K36OL-D in Willmar, Minnesota
- K36OM-D in Tropic, Utah
- K36ON-D in Escalante, Utah
- K36OO-D in Boulder, Utah
- K36OP-D in Hanksville, Utah
- K36OQ-D in Caineville, Utah
- K36OR-D in Logan, Utah
- K36OS-D in Whitehall, Montana
- K36OT-D in Coalville, Utah
- K36OU-D in Mountain View, Wyoming
- K36OV-D in Wanship, Utah
- K36OW-D in Henefer & Echo, Utah
- K36OX-D in Samak, Utah
- K36OY-D in Sterling, Colorado
- K36OZ-D in Hakalau, Hawaii
- K36PA-D in Kanarraville, etc., Utah
- K36PB-D in Lewistown, Montana
- K36PC-D in Emery, Utah
- K36PD-D in Green River, Utah
- K36PE-D in Peach Springs, Arizona
- K36PF-D in Ferron, Utah
- K36PH-D in Methow, Washington
- K36PI-D in Livingston, etc., Montana
- K36PJ-D in Howard, Montana
- K36PK-D in Peoa, etc., Utah
- K36PL-D in Park City, Utah
- K36PM-D in Salmon, Idaho
- K36PN-D in Beowawe, Nevada
- K36PO-D in Winnemucca, Nevada
- K36PP-D in Farmington, etc., New Mexico
- K36PS-D in Julesburg, Colorado
- K36PT-D in Haxtun, Colorado
- K36PU-D in Pioche, Nevada
- K36PV-D in Gallup, New Mexico
- K36PW-D in Priest Lake, Idaho
- K36PX-D in Caliente, Nevada
- K36PY-D in Pagosa Springs, Colorado
- K36PZ-D in Big Spring, Texas
- K36QA-D in Lufkin, Texas
- K36QB-D in Cortez, Colorado
- K36QD-D in Omaha, Nebraska
- K36QH-D in Santa Barbara, California
- K36QM-D in Iowa, Louisiana
- K47GI-D in Grants Pass, Oregon
- KADO-CD in Shreveport, Louisiana
- KAZT-CD in Phoenix, Arizona
- KBFK-LP in Bakersfield, California
- KBNS-CD in Branson, Missouri
- KBTR-CD in Baton Rouge, Louisiana
- KBWU-LD in Richland, etc., Washington
- KCBZ-LD in Casper, Wyoming
- KEVC-CD in Indio, California
- KFFS-CD in Fayetteville, Arkansas
- KGKM-LD in Columbia, Missouri
- KGMM-CD in San Antonio, Texas
- KHHI-LD in Honolulu, Hawaii
- KHSL-TV in Redding, California
- KJTB-LD in Paragould, Arkansas
- KJWY-LD in Salem, Oregon
- KKAX-LD in Hilltop, Arizona
- KKEI-CD in Portland, Oregon
- KLGV-LD in Longview, Texas
- KLMB-CD in El Dorado, Arkansas
- KLML-LD in Grand Junction, Colorado
- KMQV-LD in Rochester, Minnesota
- KPWT-LD in Astoria, Oregon
- KSBO-CD in San Luis Obispo, California
- KSKT-CD in San Marcos, California
- KTFO-CD in Austin, Texas
- KTMF-LD in Kalispell, Montana
- KTPN-LD in Tyler, Texas
- KUIL-LD in Beaumont, Texas
- KUOK-CD in Oklahoma City, Oklahoma
- KUVE-CD in Tucson, Arizona
- KVES-LD in Palm Springs, California
- KWYT-LD in Yakima, Washington
- KXTV (DRT) in West Sacramento, California
- KZOD-LD in Odessa, Texas
- W24CP-D in Durham, North Carolina
- W36DO-D in Darby, Pennsylvania
- W36EC-D in Bartow, Florida, to move to channel 15
- W36EI-D in Wausau, Wisconsin
- W36EO-D in La Grange, Georgia
- W36EP-D in Yauco, Puerto Rico, to move to channel 35
- W36EQ-D in Liberal, Kansas
- W36EY-D in Berwick, Pennsylvania
- W36FA-D in Hesperia, Michigan
- W36FB-D in Biscoe, North Carolina
- W36FE-D in Hanover, New Hampshire
- W36FH-D in Traverse City, Michigan
- W36FJ-D in Sebring, Florida
- W36FK-D in Pittsburgh, Pennsylvania
- W36FM-D in Etna, Maine
- W36FN-D in Baraboo, Wisconsin
- WASV-LD in Asheville, North Carolina
- WBFT-CD in Sanford, North Carolina
- WBXI-CD in Indianapolis, Indiana
- WBXN-CD in New Orleans, Louisiana
- WCAY-CD in Key West, Florida
- WCEA-LD in Boston, Massachusetts
- WCNT-LP in Chattanooga, Tennessee
- WDSF-LD in Montgomery, Alabama
- WEIN-LD in Evansville, Indiana
- WGCB-LD in Hinesville-Richmond, Georgia
- WGCW-LD in Albany, Georgia
- WGOX-LD in Mobile, Alabama
- WHDO-CD in Orlando, Florida
- WIMN-CD in Arecibo, Puerto Rico
- WMKE-CD in Milwaukee, Wisconsin
- WMNT-CD in Toledo, Ohio
- WMVS in Milwaukee, Wisconsin
- WNGN-LD in Troy, New York
- WODP-LD in Fort Wayne, Indiana
- WPMC-CD in Mappsville, Virginia
- WRID-LD in Richmond, Virginia
- WRJK-LD in Arlington Heights, Illinois
- WSPF-CD in St. Petersburg, Florida
- WSVF-CD in Harrisonburg, Virginia
- WSWB in Scranton, Pennsylvania
- WWLM-CD in Washington, Pennsylvania
- WXTL-LD in Tallahassee, Florida
- WXWZ-LD in Guayama, Puerto Rico
- WYCN-LD in Boston, Massachusetts
- WYSJ-CD in Yorktown, Virginia
- WZDT-LD in Naples, Florida

The following stations, which are no longer licensed, formerly broadcast on analog or digital channel 36:

- K36AF-D in New Castle, Colorado
- K36BR in Fraser, etc., Colorado
- K36BT in Blue Lake, California
- K36DC in Beowawe, etc., Nevada
- K36DU in Lake Havasu City, etc., Arizona
- K36ED in Fairbanks, Alaska
- K36EZ in Billings, Montana
- K36FX in Green River, Utah
- K36GO in Morongo Valley, California
- K36HL in Grants Pass, Oregon
- K36HV-D in Wallowa, Oregon
- K36IN-D in Fruitland, etc., Utah
- K36KA-D in Rolla, Missouri
- K36KL-D in Gruver, Texas
- K36MA-D in Perryton, Texas
- K36NJ-D in Monett, Missouri
- K36OK-D in Granite Falls, Minnesota
- K36QI-D in Quartz Creek, etc., Montana
- KCDL-LD in Boise, Idaho
- KDVT-LP in Denver, Colorado
- KJCN-LP in Paso Robles, California
- KKNJ-LP in Alamogordo, New Mexico
- KXHD-LP in Montrose, Colorado
- KXOR-LP in Eugene, Oregon
- KXTY-LP in Ely, Nevada
- KZMB-LD in Enid, Oklahoma
- W36AC in McComb, Mississippi
- W36BE-D in State College, Pennsylvania
- WHSH-LP in Rochester, New York
