= Channel 36 =

Channel 36 refers to several television stations:

== Canada ==
The following television stations broadcast on digital or analog channel 36 (UHF frequencies covering 603.25-607.75 MHz) in Canada:

- CHNE-TV in Chéticamp, Nova Scotia lately move to channel 25
- CITS-DT in Burlington, Ontario lately move to channel 14
- CKWS-TV-3 in Smiths Falls, Ontario lately move to channel 19

The following television stations operate on virtual channel 36 in Canada:

- CITS-DT in Burlington, Ontario

== Philippines ==
- Central Luzon Television 36, Pampanga.

== Vietnam ==
- DN1-RTV, Dong Nai

== See also ==
- Channel 36 TV stations in Mexico
- Channel 36 digital TV stations in the United States
- Channel 36 virtual TV stations in the United States
- Channel 36 low-power TV stations in the United States
