= KPSE-LD =

Television station in Palm Springs, California

- Palm Springs, California; United States
- Channels: Digital: 29 (UHF); Virtual: 50
- Branding: KPSE My TV; Bounce TV Palm Springs (50.3)

Programming
- Affiliations: 50.1: Independent with MyNetworkTV; for others, see § Subchannels

Ownership
- Owner: Entravision Communications; (Entravision Holdings, LLC)
- Sister stations: KEVC-CD, KLOB, KMIR-TV, KPST-FM, KVER-CD

History
- First air date: January 3, 2000
- Former call signs: K50FB (1996–1999); KPSE-LP (1999–2014)
- Former channel numbers: Analog: 50 (UHF, 2000–2014)
- Former affiliations: UPN (2000–2006); TheCoolTV (secondary)
- Call sign meaning: "King of Palm Springs Entertainment" (slogan)

Technical information
- Licensing authority: FCC
- Facility ID: 181414
- Class: LD
- ERP: 1 kW
- HAAT: 210.9 m (692 ft)
- Transmitter coordinates: 33°52′0.0″N 116°26′2″W

Links
- Public license information: LMS

KPSE-LD (channel 50, cable channel 20) is a low-power television station licensed to Palm Springs, California, United States, serving the Coachella Valley. It is programmed primarily as an independent station, but maintains a secondary affiliation with MyNetworkTV. Owned by Entravision Communications, KPSE-LD is sister to NBC affiliate KMIR-TV (channel 36), Univision affiliate KVER-CD (channel 41) and UniMás affiliate KEVC-CD (channel 5). KPSE and KMIR share studios on Parkview Drive in Palm Desert; KEVC and KVER maintain separate facilities on Corporate Way, also in Palm Desert. KPSE's transmitter is located atop Edom Hill in Cathedral City.

== History ==
The station signed on January 3, 2000, as KPSE-LP on channel 50, the market's first locally based UPN affiliate. Owned by Mirage Media, it immediately replaced Los Angeles' KCOP-TV on Coachella Valley's Time Warner Cable system; until KPSE's launch, KCOP had served as UPN's de facto affiliate for Palm Springs. After UPN and The WB shut down and merged in 2006 to form The CW (which affiliated with KCWQ-LP and a subchannel of ABC affiliate KESQ-TV), KPSE joined MyNetworkTV.

On September 26, 2007, Journal Communications (owner of KMIR) announced its purchase of KPSE from Mirage Media for $4.7 million with the transaction receiving approval January 28, 2008. In October 2013, Journal reached a deal to sell KMIR and KPSE to OTA Broadcasting, LLC (a company controlled by Michael Dell's MSD Capital). The sale was completed January 1, 2014

Along with other major Coachella Valley stations, KPSE-LP formerly identified itself on-air using its cable channel 13 position (which it took over from KCOP-TV) rather than its over-the-air analog channel position. This unusual practice (also common in the Fort Myers–Naples, Florida market) stems in part from Palm Springs's exceptionally high cable penetration rate of 80.5% which is one of the highest in the United States. The station now brands simply as "KPSE My TV".

On September 22, 2011, Journal was granted a construction permit for a new low-power digital station on channel 29, which was immediately issued the call sign K29KF-D. On September 3, 2014, OTA Broadcasting changed K29KF-D's call letters to KPSG-LD and applied for a license to cover the permit; a week later, channel 29 became KPSE-LD, while KPSE-LP on channel 50 took the KPSG-LP call sign. On May 26, 2015, the KPSG-LP license was canceled.

On July 21, 2017, it was announced that Spanish-language broadcaster Entravision Communications (minority owned by Univision Communications) was acquiring KPSE and KMIR-TV for $21 million. The sale to Entravision will make both stations a sister stations to KEVC-CD, KVER-CD and KVES-LD. The transaction was completed on November 1.

=== 2013 Time Warner Cable compensation dispute ===
Due to its low-power status, the station was pulled from Time Warner Cable systems at midnight on July 11, 2013, in a retransmission consent dispute with Time Warner; KMIR continued to air on the system due to rules disallowing full-power stations from being pulled during a sweeps period. KMIR, along with all Journal stations, was pulled at midnight on July 25, 2013, off Time Warner systems at the end of the sweeps period. On September 20, 2013, a deal was reached to return Journal's stations, including KMIR and KPSE, to Time Warner Cable; as part of the deal, KPSE moved to channel 20, ceding its former channel 13 slot to KMIR (which lost its longtime channel 6 position to Game Show Network).

== Newscasts ==
Sister station KMIR produces three local news broadcasts for KPSE-LD. This includes a two-hour extension of the NBC affiliate's weekday morning show. Known as KMIR News Today on KPSE My TV, the program can be seen from 7 to 9 a.m. offering a local alternative to Today. There is a nightly prime time newscast called KMIR News at 10:00 on KPSE My TV that runs for 30 minutes. All KPSE-LD broadcasts compete with local news seen on Class A Fox affiliate KDFX-CD that is produced by rival KESQ and KPSP.

== Subchannels ==
The station's signal is multiplexed:

Subchannels of KPSE-LD
Channel	Res.	Short name	Programming
50.1	1080i	KPSE-LD	Main KPSE-LD programming
50.2	480i	Grit	Grit
50.3	480i	Bounce	Bounce TV
50.4	480i	CourtTV	Court TV

== See also ==
- Channel 13 branded TV stations in the United States
- Channel 29 digital TV stations in the United States
- Channel 29 low-power TV stations in the United States
- Channel 50 virtual TV stations in the United States
