= KMIR-TV =

Television station in Palm Springs, California

- Palm Springs, California; United States
- Channels: Digital: 26 (UHF); Virtual: 36
- Branding: NBC Palm Springs; MeTV Palm Springs (36.2)

Programming
- Affiliations: 36.1: NBC; for others, see § Subchannels

Ownership
- Owner: Entravision Communications; (Entravision Holdings, LLC)
- Sister stations: KEVC-CD, KLOB, KPSE-LD, KPST-FM, KVER-CD, KVES-LD

History
- First air date: September 15, 1968
- Former channel numbers: Analog: 36 (UHF, 1968–2009); Digital: 46 (UHF, 2002–2019)
- Call sign meaning: Hotel el Mirador

Technical information
- Licensing authority: FCC
- Facility ID: 16749
- ERP: 1,000 kW
- HAAT: 212.5 m (697 ft)
- Transmitter coordinates: 33°52′0″N 116°26′2″W

Links
- Public license information: Public file; LMS
- Website: nbcpalmsprings.com

KMIR-TV (channel 36, cable channel 13) is a television station licensed to Palm Springs, California, United States, serving as the NBC affiliate for the Coachella Valley. It is owned by Entravision Communications (as the company's only NBC affiliate), and is sister to Univision affiliate KVER-CD (channel 41), UniMás affiliate KEVC-CD (channel 5), and KPSE-LD (channel 50), an independent station with MyNetworkTV. KMIR and KPSE share studios on Parkview Drive in Palm Desert; KEVC and KVER maintain separate facilities on Corporate Way, also in Palm Desert. KMIR's transmitter is located atop Edom Hill in Cathedral City.

== History ==
The station was the first to broadcast in the Coachella Valley on September 15, 1968. Airing an analog signal on UHF channel 36, it has been an NBC affiliate from the start. Actor John Conte owned the station through the Desert Empire TV Corporation, and was the proprietor of the Hotel el Mirador in Palm Springs, from which the call letters were derived. Desert Regional Medical Center now occupies the site of the old hotel. Today, one can still see the El Mirador broadcasting tower standing in front of the hospital. This is where the station originally transmitted from. The current tower is a replica structure emulating the original, which was destroyed in a 1989 fire.

Journal Communications acquired KMIR from Conte in 1999 for $30 million. In 2008, the station celebrated its 40th anniversary. In October 2013, Journal reached a deal to sell KMIR to OTA Broadcasting for $17 million. The sale was completed on January 1, 2014, making KMIR the company's first station affiliated with one of the Big Four television networks.

Along with the other major Coachella Valley stations, KMIR formerly identified itself on-air using its cable designation (at that time, channel 6) rather than its over-the-air digital channel position. This unusual practice (also common in the Fort Myers–Naples, Florida market, where KMIR's former sister station WFTX-TV serves as the market's Fox affiliate) stems in part from Palm Springs's exceptionally high cable penetration rate of 80.5%, which is one of the highest in the United States. As of 2014, the station branded simply with its call letters.

Due to its low-power status, KPSE-LP was pulled from Time Warner Cable systems at midnight on July 11, 2013, in a retransmission consent dispute with Time Warner; KMIR continued to air on the system for thirteen days after due to rules disallowing full-power stations from being pulled during a sweeps period. KMIR, along with all Journal stations, was pulled at midnight on July 25, 2013, off Time Warner systems at the end of the sweeps period. The station's evening newscasts were simulcast by KRET-CA on Time Warner channel 14 during the dispute. On September 20, 2013, a deal was reached to return Journal's stations, including KMIR and KPSE, to Time Warner Cable; as part of the deal, KMIR's standard definition channel moved to channel 13, the former location for KPSE (which moved to channel 20). KMIR's previous position, cable channel 6, is now occupied by Game Show Network. With the station no longer carried on channel 6 on any cable or satellite systems in the Coachella Valley, the station rebranded in late 2013, dropping the '6' from its logo.

Logo used until 2023

On July 21, 2017, it was announced that Spanish-language broadcaster Entravision Communications (minority owned by Univision Communications) was acquiring KMIR and KPSE-LD for $21 million. The sale to Entravision made both stations sister to KEVC-CD, KVER-CD and KVES-LD. The transaction was completed on November 1.

On September 16, 2018, coinciding with the station's 50th anniversary, KMIR-TV rebranded as "NBC Palm Springs".

== News operation ==
KMIR logo with cable channel 6 branding

KMIR-TV presently broadcasts 28 hours of news programming per week (with five hours each weekday and 1 1/2 hours each on Saturdays and Sundays).

The station's newscasts are produced in full 1080i high definition, including all video from the field. In September 2014, the station launched a new 9 p.m. newscast on sister station KPSE. It also produces a 10 p.m. newscast on KPSE known as KMIR News at 10:00 on KPSE My TV. Former sister station KTNV-TV in Las Vegas provided the station's weather forecasts until the start of 2015, when the station hired former Connecticut-based meteorologist Geoff Fox, However, on August 4, 2015, KMIR announced that Ginger Jeffries (former meteorologist on KESQ-TV) was joining KMIR; and would replace Geoff Fox.

KMIR does not have a dedicated sports department, but its news department covers major sporting events and the station extensively covers high school football on Friday nights during football season.

The station's newscasts generally place second in the Nielsen ratings in the Palm Springs market. In late 2023, the station began changing its news focus with less coverage of crime and low-impact stories while placing greater emphasis on community issues and storytelling that serves the audience. In 2018, KMIR received a Golden Mic for the "Best Newscast in Southern California" from the Radio and Television Association of Southern California.

=== Notable current on-air staff ===
- Fred Roggin – host of The Roggin Report (debuted on January 2, 2024)

=== Notable former on-air staff ===
- Geoff Fox – meteorologist (2015)
- Hank Plante – on-air political analyst
- John Schubeck – anchor (1993-1995)

== Subchannels ==
The station's signal is multiplexed:

Subchannels of KMIR-TV
Channel	Res.	Short name	Programming
36.1	1080i	KMIR-HD	NBC
36.2	480i	MeTV	MeTV

== See also ==
- Channel 6 branded TV stations in the United States
- Channel 36 virtual TV stations in the United States
- Channel 26 digital TV stations in the United States
