= Channel 36 virtual TV stations in the United States =

The following television stations operate on virtual channel 36 in the United States:

- K16KE-D in Baudette, Minnesota
- K23BJ-D in Lake Havasu City, Arizona
- K23LH-D in Cortez, Colorado
- K26PL-D in Roswell, New Mexico
- K30OM-D in Monterey, California
- K33OV-D in Whitehall, Montana
- K36AB-D in Lawton, Oklahoma
- K36DB-CD in Avon/Vail, Colorado
- K36EW-D in College Place, Washington
- K36GJ-D in Agana, Guam
- K36II-D in Joplin, Missouri
- K36IO-D in Manhattan, Kansas
- K36JH-D in Barstow, California
- K36KE-D in Ardmore, Oklahoma
- K36LD-D in College Station, Texas
- K36LW-D in Williams, Minnesota
- K36MU-D in Texarkana, Arkansas
- K36NB-D in Carson City, Nevada
- K36ND-D in Victoria, Texas
- K36NZ-D in Clarkston, Washington
- K36OS-D in Whitehall, Montana
- K36QA-D in Lufkin, Texas
- K36QH-D in Santa Barbara, California
- K36QM-D in Iowa, Louisiana
- KAJR-LD in Des Moines, Iowa
- KBFK-LP in Bakersfield, California
- KBNS-CD in Branson, Missouri
- KBTR-CD in Baton Rouge, Louisiana
- KDTF-LD in San Diego, California
- KEVE-LD in Vancouver, Washington
- KFFS-CD in Fayetteville, Arkansas
- KGKM-LD in Columbia, Missouri
- KHIN in Red Oak, Iowa
- KICU-TV in San Jose, California
- KJTB-LD in Paragould, Arkansas
- KKAP in Little Rock, Arkansas
- KKAX-LD in Hilltop, Arizona
- KLGV-LD in Longview, Texas
- KMIR-TV in Palm Springs, California
- KMTW in Hutchinson, Kansas
- KPBT-TV in Odessa, Texas
- KQIN in Davenport, Iowa
- KQRY-LD in Fort Smith, Arkansas
- KSFL-TV in Sioux Falls, South Dakota
- KTVC in Roseburg, Oregon
- KTVS-LD in Albuquerque, New Mexico
- KUOK-CD in Oklahoma City, Oklahoma
- KWYT-LD in Yakima, Washington
- KXAN-TV in Austin, Texas
- KYUB-LD in Yuba City, California
- W17EE-D in Lilesville/Wadesboro, North Carolina
- W30DZ-D in Fence, Wisconsin
- W34FR-D in Ithaca, New York
- W36DO-D in Darby, Pennsylvania
- W36EC-D in Bartow, Florida
- W36EI-D in Wausau, Wisconsin
- W36EO-D in La Grange, Georgia
- W36EQ-D in Liberal, Kansas
- W36FB-D in Biscoe, North Carolina
- W36FH-D in Traverse City, Michigan
- W36FM-D in Etna, Maine
- W36FN-D in Baraboo, Wisconsin
- WAPK-CD in Bristol, Virginia/Kingsport, Tennessee
- WATL in Atlanta, Georgia
- WCAY-CD in Key West, Florida
- WCIV in Charleston, South Carolina
- WCNC-TV in Charlotte, North Carolina
- WDNP-LD in St. Petersburg, Florida
- WDWL in Bayamon, Puerto Rico
- WDYC-LD in Cincinnati, Ohio
- WENY-TV in Elmira, New York
- WFIQ in Florence, Alabama
- WFTX-TV in Cape Coral, Florida
- WGCW-LD in Albany, Georgia
- WGPT in Oakland, Maryland
- WKIN-CD in Weber County, Virginia/Kingsport, Tennessee
- WLEF-TV in Park Falls, Wisconsin
- WMDE in Dover, Delaware
- WMVT in Milwaukee, Wisconsin
- WNTE-LD in Mayaguez, Puerto Rico
- WQAP-LD in Montgomery, Alabama
- WQEK-LD in Clarksdale, Mississippi
- WSBE-TV in Providence, Rhode Island
- WTVQ-DT in Lexington, Kentucky
- WUNP-TV in Roanoke, Rapids, North Carolina
- WUPW in Toledo, Ohio
- WXTL-LD in Tallahassee, Florida
- WZXZ-CD in Orlando, etc., Florida

The following stations, which formerly operated on virtual channel 36, are no longer licensed:

- K36KA-D in Rolla, Missouri
- W31DL-D in Ponce, Puerto Rico
- W34FV-D in Soperton, Georgia
