= Enerpac Tool Group =

Industrial tool company

Enerpac Tool Group Corp.
- Formerly: Actuant Corporation
- Type: Public
- Traded as: NYSE: EPAC (Class A); S&P 600 component
- Industry: Industrial Tools
- Founded: 1910; 116 years ago
- Founders: Leo Bethke, Frank Lueck, Charles Krause
- Headquarters: Menomonee Falls, Wisconsin, U.S.
- Area served: Worldwide
- Key people: Paul Sternlieb (CEO, president)
- Revenue: $571M (cite FY22 annual report: Annual Reports: Enerpac Tool Group Corp. (EPAC))
- Operating income: ▲US$ .138 billion (2016)
- Total assets: ▲US$ 1.5 billion (2018)
- Total equity: ▲US$ .673 billion (2016)
- Number of employees: 2,300 (2019)

Enerpac Tool Group Corp., formerly Actuant Corporation is a company that was founded in 1910 and is headquartered in Menomonee Falls, Wisconsin. Enerpac Tool Group common stock trades on the NYSE under the symbol EPAC.

== History ==
Enerpac was founded in 1958 under the name Applied Power.

Applied Power made its initial public offering and began trading on NASDAQ in 1987. The following year, Applied Power acquired Gardner Bender from Gardner family

In 1989, Applied Power acquired Barry Wright Corporation

In 2000, the company announced the spin-off of its electronics business segment, doing business as AWP, Ltd.

In 2005, Actuant acquired Hedley Purvis and Hydratight Sweeney - initiating the Joint Integrity platform.

In 2010, historian John Gurda authored “The Drive To Lead”, a history of Actuant that celebrated the company's 100th anniversary.

In 2013, the company acquired Viking Sea Tech

In 2015, Hayes Industries, Ltd was acquired for nearly 31 million US dollars. Hayes Industries, Ltd. and Precision Sure-Lock are combined to form Precision-Hayes International.

In 2016, Randy Baker becomes President and CEO of Actuant Corporation That same year, Larzep SA and FourQuest MENAC were acquired.

In 2017, Actuant acquired Mirage Machines and sold Viking SeaTech.

The company acquired Equalizer International for $5.8 million in May 2018.

The company changed its name from Actuant to Enerpac Tool Group in 2019. Following the name change in October of that year, the company began trading under a new stock ticker symbol, EPAC. In 2019, Enerpac also sold its engineered components and systems segment to One Rock Capital, who renamed the division CentroMotion.

In 2020, Enerpac Tool Group acquired controlled bolting sales and rental company HTL Group, UK

In 2021, Enerpac Tool Group announced Paul Sternlieb as the CEO and President

The company sold its Cortland Industrial business in 2023 to Tufropes, a Toronto-based company, for $20 million.

In 2024, Enerpac Tool Group acquired DTA The Smart Move for €24 million.

In 2025, Enerpac Tool Group moved their headquarters to Milwaukee, Wisconsin.

== Enerpac ==
Enerpac, a division of Enerpac Tool Group (NYSE: EPAC), is a $1.5 billion diversified global manufacturing company of industrial tools, and is headquartered in Milwaukee, Wisconsin. Enerpac operates in the high-pressure hydraulics market with locations in worldwide. The business has over 30 offices in 22 different countries and over 1,000 employees. Enerpac manufactures high-pressure hydraulic equipment such as controlled bolting tools and portable machine equipment, to the international market. The business focuses on the design of products, from small cylinders to computer-operated lifting & positioning systems.

Historian John Gurda authored "The Drive To Lead," a history of Actuant, that highlights important events in Enerpac's history.

== Power-Packer ==
Power-Packer is a Netherlands-based producer and distributor of electro-hydraulic motion control systems for customers on a global basis, and is part of the CentroMotion organization. Their market includes original equipment manufacturers and suppliers in different markets, such as automotive, medical, commercial vehicles and others. Power-Packer has headquarters in the Netherlands and the United States, and manufacturing plants in those countries as well as Turkey, France, Mexico, Brazil, China and India. Power-Packer specializes in solutions for motion control.

== Awards and recognition ==
- The Robert W. Baird Outstanding Achievement Award in Employee Giving
- Forbes 400 Best Big Companies
- BusinessWeek Top 100 "Hot Growth Company"
- Investor's Business Daily: "Actuant Corp. Milwaukee, Wisconsin; Manufacturer is a switch-hitter on growth"
- Investor's Business Daily: "Actuant Seeks Out Niches To Make it Big Fish in Pond"
- Milwaukee Business Journal: "Andy Lampereur named CFO of the Year"
