= KRET-CD =

Television station in Palm Springs, California

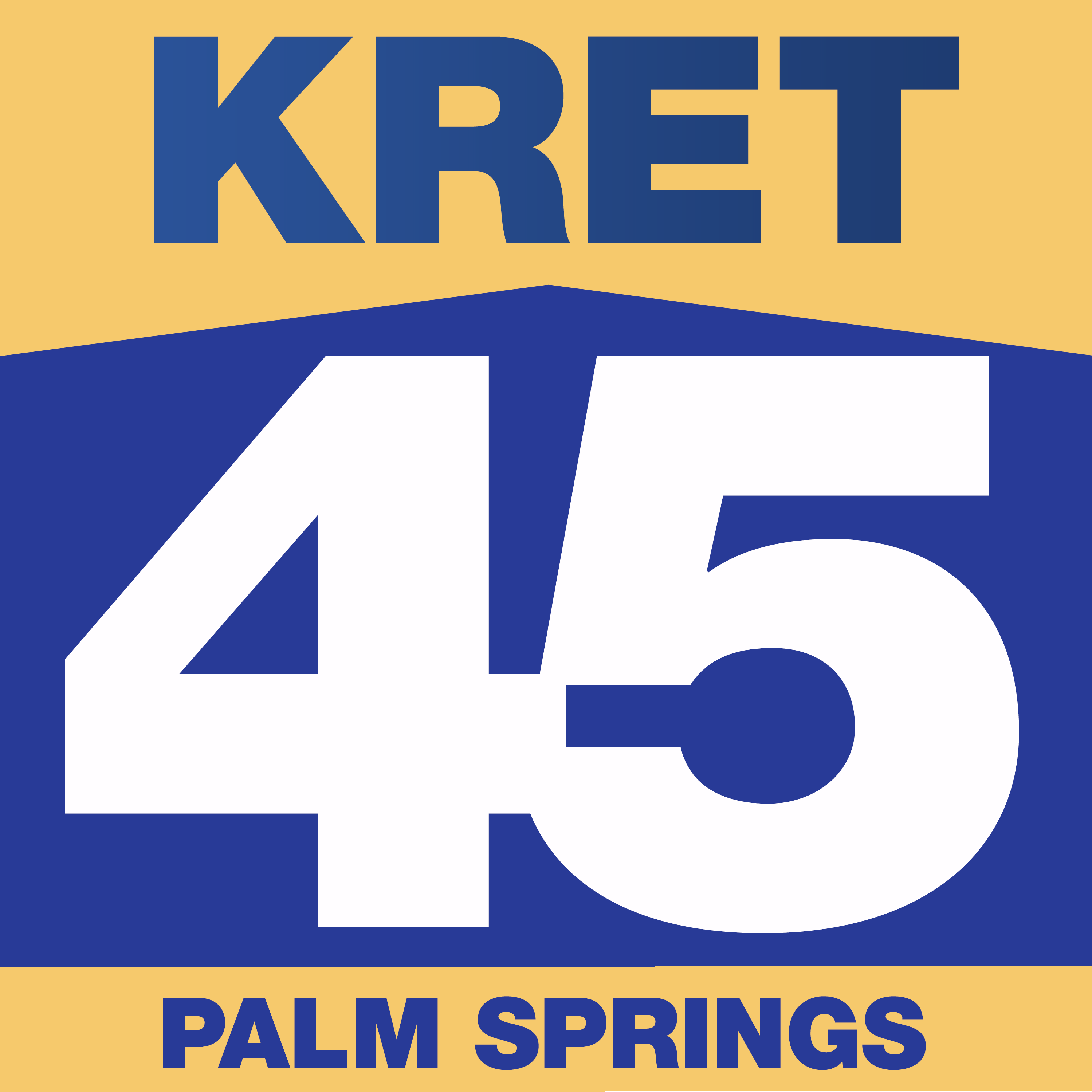
- Palm Springs, California; United States
- Channels: Digital: 31 (UHF); Virtual: 45
- Branding: KRET 45 Palm Springs

Programming
- Affiliations: 45.1: Binge TV; for others, see § Subchannels

Ownership
- Owner: Bridge Media Networks; (Bridge News LLC)

History
- Founded: January 24, 1996
- First air date: October 5, 1997
- Former call signs: K45ET (1996–1998); KPSP-LP (1998–1999); KDPX-LP (1999–2008); KRET-CA (2008–2014)
- Former affiliations: Independent (1997–1999); Pax/Ion (1999–2008); Retro TV (2008–2011); MeTV (2011–2018); Heroes & Icons (2018–2023); NewsNet (2023–2024); ShopHQ (2024–2025)
- Call sign meaning: Retro TV (former affiliation)

Technical information
- Licensing authority: FCC
- Facility ID: 10536
- Class: CD
- ERP: 15 kW
- HAAT: 175.9 m (577 ft)
- Transmitter coordinates: 33°51′58″N 116°26′8″W

Links
- Public license information: Public file; LMS

KRET-CD (channel 45) is a low-power, Class A television station licensed to Palm Springs, California, United States, serving the Coachella Valley area as an affiliate of the digital multicast network Binge TV. The station is owned Bridge Media Networks.

== History ==
The Federal Communications Commission (FCC) granted an original construction permit to Charles R. Meeker on January 24, 1996, to build a low-power television station on UHF channel 45 to serve Cathedral City and Palm Springs, California. It began broadcasting October 18, 1997, under the operation of Sun Holding Corporation as independent station K45ET, branded as "Sun TV". On February 6, 1998, the call sign was changed to KPSP-LP.

Sun TV lacked cable carriage on the main Time Warner Cable system until 1998, when it was added from 6 a.m. to 6 p.m. Full-time carriage commenced in January 1999, too late for the struggling station. Sun TV folded on February 11, 1999; channel 45 then exchanged call letters with KDPX-LP (channel 58), also picking up KDPX-LP's Pax TV programming. As a Pax affiliate, the station was operated by JB Broadcasting.

In 2008, the call letters for the station were changed to KRET-CA; that May, it added Retro Television Network. In 2011, KRET added MeTV to its main channel. From late July to late September 2013, due to a retransmission consent dispute between Time Warner Cable and Journal Broadcast Group's NBC affiliate KMIR-TV, that station subcontracted with KRET-CA to carry their evening newscasts during the dispute due to KRET's channel 14 position on TWC systems.

The station was issued its license for digital operation on October 8, 2014, and simultaneously changed its call sign to KRET-CD.

In August 2023, it was announced that Bridge Media Networks would acquire the station for $800,000.

In August 2024, the station flipped to ShopHQ due to NewsNet ceasing operations.

In April 2025, the station then flipped to Binge TV due to ShopHQ shutting down.

== Subchannels ==
The station's signal is multiplexed:

Subchannels of KRET-CD
Channel	Res.	Short name	Programming
45.1	480i	KRET	Binge TV
45.2	480i	Funroads	Infomercials
45.3	480i	Bridge2	Infomercials
45.4	480i	ACEtv	Ace TV
45.5	480i	Antenna	Antenna TV
45.6	480i	OAN	One America Plus
45.7	480i	YTA	YTA TV
45.8	480i	Sales	Infomercials
45.9	480i	BarkTV	Bark TV
45.10	480i	RNTV	Right Now TV
45.11	480i	FTF	FTF Sports
45.12	480i	MTRSPR1	MtrSpt1
45.13	480i	AWE	AWE Plus
45.14	480i	NBT	National Black TV
45.15	480i	CH15	[Blank]
45.16	480i	Outdoor	[Blank]
45.17	480i	beIN	beIN Sports Xtra

Subchannel broadcast with MPEG-4 video
