= Digital Emergency Alert System =

American alert system project

The Digital Emergency Alert System (DEAS) was a system managed by the Federal Emergency Management Agency (FEMA) and designed to alert first-responders and civilians in the event of a national emergency. It was based upon and supplemented the Emergency Alert System (EAS) by sending out text, voice, video, and other digital messages to mobile phones, pagers, radios, and televisions.

Although the Emergency Alert System and its predecessor, the Emergency Broadcast System and an even earlier predecessor CONELRAD, have always allowed the transmission of both video and audio, there have been limitations that would be eliminated by the DEAS. For example, the DEAS allowed the ability to broadcast "bottomless" audio messages (i.e. a message with no definite ending) and streaming video. It also allowed near-instantaneous transmission without the delays that occur as EAS alerts trickle through the system.

== History ==
In 2004, Las Vegas' PBS member station, KLVX, was the first station in the United States to demonstrate what digital television has to offer in times of emergency.

In 2010, the DEAS project was terminated in favor of FEMA's IPAWS Open Platform for Emergency Networks (OPEN). IPAWS OPEN is a set of securely hosted Web services that enable the routing of standards-compliant emergency messages between disparate third-party applications, systems, networks and devices. As stated by FEMA, reasons for terminating DEAS included concerns over the stability and reliability of some of the underlying products, and the proprietary nature of many of the systems used within DEAS.

However, responding to a mandate included in the WARN act, FEMA continues to utilize a variant of the DEAS architecture for Wireless Emergency Alerts, also known as the Personal Localized Alerting Network (PLAN). In 2007 and 2008, the Federal Communications Commission proposed and adopted the network structure, operational procedures and technical requirements for the Personal Localized Alerting Network (PLAN) system.

== See also ==
- Common Alerting Protocol
- Commercial Mobile Alert System
