= Geoff Fox =

American television meteorologist (1950–2025)

Geoff Fox (July 26, 1950 – November 11, 2025) was an American television broadcast meteorologist, with seven Emmy awards, and a career in the industry spanning more than four decades. For just short of 27 years he worked at the television station WTNH in New Haven, Connecticut, where he started in 1984 and was senior weeknight meteorologist until 2011. Shortly after, Fox was hired by WTIC-TV in Hartford, Connecticut, where he was the weeknight 5:00 and 11:00 pm meteorologist, reported science and technology stories for the 4:00 pm newscast, and hosted a garden segment titled "Geoff's Garden" until November 2012.

Fox held a broadcast seal from the American Meteorological Society.

== Early life and education ==
Fox was born on July 26, 1950. A New York City native, graduated from Brooklyn Technical High School. He received a certificate in broadcast meteorology from Mississippi State University, and was a member of the National Weather Association.

== Television ==
In May 1984, Fox started his meteorology career with the television station WTNH in New Haven, Connecticut. where he forecasted the weather weeknights from 5:00-6:30 p.m. and the later newscasts at 10:00 p.m. on the sister station WCTX and News Channel 8 at 11:00 p.m. He was later promoted to senior meteorologist.

In 1995, in addition to working for WTNH, he began hosting the program Inside Space on Syfy (then called the SciFi Channel).

In early 2011, after 27 years at WTNH, Fox was told that his contract would not be renewed; he departed from the station. His departure received national media attention due to the loyalty of WTNH viewers in addition to his long career with the station.

In April 2011, he was hired by Fox affiliate WTIC-TV, where he forecast for the weeknight 5:00 pm and 11:00 pm weather segments, as well as science reports weeknights at 4:00 pm. He was dismissed from the station after 19 months, for what the station identified as "inappropriate conduct". At Fox CT, "I thought I was doing the best work of my career, and how many people can say that deep into their career?" he said. "I didn't think I had peaked yet.

In January 2015, he joined NBC affiliate KMIR-TV in Palm Springs, where he served as the on-air weeknight meteorologist from early 2015 until September 2015.

In the summer of 2017, an agreement was made between the management of WTNH-TV and Fox for him to return briefly to the News8 airwaves for a seven-week fill-in period, to forecast the weeknight newscasts from his home studio in California. At the end of the temporary employment period, Fox made it clear to WTNH-TV management that, though the agreement was just for the summer, he was very interested in a permanent full-time position. Management offered him a part-time position, but he declined. He made a statement saying that the offer "wasn't a good fit", but that he was thankful for the opportunity to return to the airwaves at WTNH and to show his gratitude for all the support from viewers throughout the years, as well as the personal support during his pancreatic cancer.

Fox later resided in Southern California, after moving from the East Coast in the early 2010s. Before retiring, his meteorology career had transitioned to becoming freelance and fully remote, serving as chief meteorologist on-air for Flood Communications, LLC, the independent parent company for News Channel Nebraska, also serving as independent meteorologist for newsy, Scripps News, and other independent television markets and side projects from his home-built studio weather center. Fox said, "With the set-up and technology in my home studio, I could do the weather for literally any place in the world and deliver it with so little lag that on-air chatting with the news anchors is seamless."

== Personal life ==
Fox was married with an adult daughter. Fox enjoyed gardening is his spare time spending time outdoors, building computers, tinkering with anything electronic, and making weather maps for various regions of the US and worldwide in his home-built studio weather center. During his career, he also set time aside to participate in a variety of community fundraisers and events. He was active with the Multiple Sclerosis Society, American Heart Association, North Haven Education Foundation, Red Cross, and participated in the annual walk to help find a cure for Alzheimer's disease, as well as the March of Dimes and broadcast the weather every holiday season live from Lighthouse Point Park in New Haven for the annual WTNH sponsored fantasy of lights holiday display.

== Illness and death ==
In September 2025, Fox posted via social media that doctors had discovered metastatic cancer nodules in multiple body parts, and that due to cachexia that left him "too weak to stand" and the heavy toll that previous rounds of treatment had exacted on his body. He had opted for the decision to begin palliative in-home hospice care once he felt it became necessary as he did not believe he could handle more aggressive treatment in his weakened state. He noted that he had been on palliative care for several years prior to the discovery while battling Pancreatic cancer since his first diagnosis in 2016 including having a Pancreaticoduodenectomy to remove cancerous tumors. Fox said that this decision would allow him "to stay just drugged enough to avoid the worst, And a guarantee I can die in comfort and out of pain at home."

Fox passed away in his sleep on November 11, 2025 at the age of 75.
