= John Gurda =

American writer and historian (born 1947)

- Born: June 9, 1947 (age 79); Milwaukee, Wisconsin
- Education: Marquette University High School; Boston College; University of Wisconsin-Milwaukee
- Occupations: Author; academic; journalist
- Years active: 1981–present
- Website: johngurda.com

John Gurda (born 9 June 1947 in Milwaukee, Wisconsin) is an American writer and historian.

Gurda's book, The Making of Milwaukee, was turned into an Emmy Award-winning documentary series by Milwaukee PBS. He is an eight-time winner of the Wisconsin Historical Society’s Award of Merit. He is also a local history columnist for Milwaukee Journal Sentinel.

== Education ==
John Gurda graduated Marquette University High School in Milwaukee, Wisconsin. He holds a B.A. in English from Boston College and M.A. in Cultural Geography from University of Wisconsin–Milwaukee. Gurda has been described as a non-academic historian and is widely regarded as one of the most prolific historians of Milwaukee.

== Professional Work ==
John Gurda is the author of twenty-two books, including histories of Milwaukee-area neighborhoods, industries, and places of worship. Gurda received his first corporate commission in 1981 from Northwestern Mutual. He grew his professional profile through works for a variety of nonprofit and community organizations in Milwaukee. The City of Milwaukee put out a popular series of neighborhood posters for which Gurda wrote descriptions and histories. Since 1994, Gurda has written a local history column in the Sunday edition of the Milwaukee Journal Sentinel.

Gurda’s most comprehensive and best-known work is The Making of Milwaukee which has been released in four editions. The Making of Milwaukee was the first full-length history of the region published since 1948. Gurda published a companion piece to The Making of Milwaukee called Milwaukee: City of Neighborhoods. Gurda's text, The Making of Milwaukee was the basis for a documentary series that premiered on Milwaukee Public Television in 2006 and again in 2016.

John Gurda also works as a lecturer, tour guide, and local history columnist for the Milwaukee Journal Sentinel. In December 2022, Gurda announced that he would be stepping away from his role as a columnist for the newspaper.

== Personal life ==
John Gurda was born and raised on the South Side of Milwaukee. He was one of four children, his sister Susie died in a car crash in 1968. At the age of 8, he and his family moved to the Milwaukee suburb of Hales Corners. Gurda returned to Milwaukee in 1969 after completing his B.A. at Boston College whereupon he worked as a housepainter. Since 1991, John Gurda and his wife have lived in the Fernwood subdistrict of the Bay View neighborhood of Milwaukee, Wisconsin. He has three children and four grandchildren.

== Publications ==
- "Milwaukee: A City Built on Water", 2018
- "Milwaukee: City of Neighborhoods", 2015
- "One people, many paths: A history of Jewish Milwaukee", Jewish Museum Milwaukee, 2009
- "The policyowners' company: A history of Northwestern Mutual, 1857-2007", 2007
- "Cream City Chronicles: Stories of Milwaukee's Past", Wisconsin Historical Society Press; 1 edition (October 11, 2006)
- "A Community Portrait: An Excerpt from Illuminating the Particular: Photographs of Milwaukee's Polish South Side" (co-authored with Christel T. Maass and Roman B. J. Kwasniewski), The Wisconsin Magazine of History, Vol. 87, No. 3 (Spring, 2004)
- "The Making of Milwaukee", Milwaukee County Historical Society, (December 1, 1999)
- "Path of a pioneer: A centennial history of the Wisconsin Electric Power Company", 1996
- "Profits and Patriotism: Milwaukee Industry in World War II", The Wisconsin Magazine of History, Vol. 78, No. 1 (Autumn, 1994)
- "Discover Milwaukee catalog: Overflowing with information about history, homes, character, resources of Milwaukee and its neighborhoods", 1986
- "New World odyssey: Annunciation Greek Orthodox Church and Frank Lloyd Wright", 1986
- "The quiet company: A modern history of Northwestern Mutual Life", 1983
- "The West End, Merrill Park, Pigsville, Concordia: Milwaukee", 1980
- "A guide to ethnic resources in the Milwaukee area", 1977
- "Bay View, Wis: Milwaukee", 1979
