= WMNT-CD =

Television station in Toledo, Ohio

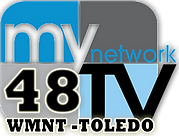
- Toledo, Ohio; United States
- Channels: Digital: 36 (UHF); Virtual: 48
- Branding: My48

Programming
- Affiliations: 48.1: Shop LC (primary) / MyNetworkTV (secondary); for others, see § Subchannels

Ownership
- Owner: Community Broadcast Group, Inc.

History
- Founded: March 23, 1987
- First air date: March 6, 1989
- Former call signs: W48AP (1987–1996); WNGT-LP (1996–2006); WMNT-CA (2006–2015)
- Former channel numbers: Analog: 48 (UHF, 1987–2013); Digital: 48 (UHF, 2013–2019)
- Former affiliations: Independent and FamilyNet (1989–1990); Star TV (1990–1991); Channel America (1991–1992); The Box (1992–1995); UPN (1995–2006); MyNetworkTV (2006–January 2020); Justice Network (2015–2019); Infomercials (January–September 2020); Cozi TV (2020–2025, now on 48.8)
- Call sign meaning: MyNetworkTV

Technical information
- Licensing authority: FCC
- Facility ID: 51913
- Class: CD
- ERP: 15 kW
- HAAT: 127.6 m (419 ft)
- Transmitter coordinates: 41°39′12.1″N 83°31′50.2″W

Links
- Public license information: Public file; LMS
- Website: matrixbroadcastgro.wixsite.com/mytvtoledo

WMNT-CD (channel 48) is a low-power, Class A television station in Toledo, Ohio, United States, airing programming from Shop LC and MyNetworkTV. The station is owned by Community Broadcast Group, Inc. WMNT-CD's studios are located in a strip mall at the corner of Reynolds Road and Dussel Drive in Maumee, and its transmitter is located on top of the One SeaGate tower in downtown Toledo.

On cable, the station is available on Toledo's Buckeye Broadband on channel 58 (hence the former branding of My58). It claims no other pay TV carriage in the Toledo market, nor are its subchannels carried by any pay TV provider.

== History ==
The station was licensed as W48AP on March 23, 1987, with broadcasts commencing on March 6, 1989, from studios and transmitters located at 716 North Westwood Avenue, in west Toledo. Launched as "HomeTown TV 48", it carried a wide variety of locally produced programming including a trivia quiz game show (Trivia in Toledo, or TnT, hosted by Jerry Millen); a current affairs and political program (High Level Views, hosted by Chuck Schmitt); Neighbor Talk, an interview-driven talk show hosted by general manager Bob Moore, and featuring local guests talking about topics ranging from political issues to hobbies; a nightly auction program featuring products from local merchants and hosted by Douglas Goff; broadcasts of entertainment acts from local fairs and festivals; a weekly auto and boat sale program called Wheels, Keels, and Deals and a spin-off called Homes for Sale, featuring local real property and hosted by Bob DuParis; a children's series called Abracadabra featuring games, activities, and ventriloquism; a variety show hosted by long-time actor and singer Johnny Ginger; local high school football and basketball games (several each week); as well as other specials and series. Programming during non-prime hours was provided by FamilyNet (later seen in Toledo on WLMB), which featured classic movies and religious programs.

Although W48AP was widely recognized as a pioneer of community-oriented low-power television (LPTV), it suffered initially in its bid for cable TV carriage, as the local cable systems did not generally grant LPTV stations space on their networks. This effectively relegated their signal to being viewed on "second TVs" in the minority of households that did not subscribe to cable—which meant that getting advertising support was difficult. Exacerbating the difficulties posed by lack of cable carriage, the local newspaper (the Toledo Blade, whose owner Block Communications also own the local cable system), refused to publish TV listings for TV48. The station bought small ads in the Sunday TV listings booklet, but was unable to list their programming alongside the other stations in the main listing section. However, TV48 was able to secure a cable slot on April 24, 1989, on Buckeye Cablesystem, though on channel 29B (or "B-29", as TV48 referred to it), away from the other local channels, and on the other side of what was then a dual-coaxial cable system divided into "A" and "B" sides. Buckeye Cablesystem responded by turning its local programming channel on 5A into a unique format, where it would be programmed as an independent station solely on cable, launching ToledoVision 5, which took programming inventory which would have usually ended up by default on W48AP.

This marginalization of TV48 led to it not being able to survive the expense of producing dozens of hours of local programming each week. By 1990, TV48 had dropped the "HomeTown TV48" moniker and resorted to full-time satellite-fed programming from the short-lived Star Television Network in the 1990–1991 period (featuring classic TV shows from the 1940s), using the moniker "TV Heaven", and then Channel America.

As a last-ditch effort to keep the TV48 signal on the air and producing a revenue stream, in 1992, it began airing pay-per-view music videos from The Box full-time (with audio simulcast from local CHR radio station WTWR during periods with no videos), which lasted until 1995. Station co-founder Robert S. "Bob" Moore, along with Denny Long, managed the station from its beginning until 1995. W48AP was then sold to Marty and Linda Miller through their company L&M Video Productions Inc. It affiliated the station with the then-new UPN network in 1995, and changed its call letters to WNGT-LP (New Generation Television) in 1996. L&M reached a deal with Cornerstone Church, a local Pentecostal congregation, to invest in the station to provide funding.

WNGT-LP's UPN logo, used from 2002 to 2006. Although this was UPN's main logo at the time, this logo was only used on its website, while WNGT still used the UPN shapes logo from 1995.

WNGT-LP went into receivership in February 2005. Ralph DeNune III, who was appointed by the Lucas County Common Pleas Court to oversee the station when it was in receivership, discovered during a series of unannounced visits that the station's studio at the National City Bank Building in downtown Toledo was often left unlocked and unattended, which would allow members of the public to enter the facility and disrupt the station's programming. Miller defended the operational state of the studio, arguing that the station's equipment was too complex for an uneducated person to operate, and that most people were unaware of the studio's location to begin with. DeNune also discovered that the station had received airtime payments for infomercials that never ended up airing. As a result, he reached a deal with the Cornerstone Church, through subsidiary Matrix Broadcasting Communications, to purchase the station. Following the September 2006 shutdown of UPN, WNGT switched to MyNetworkTV, and changed its call letters to WMNT-CA.

The Millers attempted to oppose the sale of the station, but it was approved by the FCC in May 2007. In 2008, the Millers made several attempts to regain the station's license, including an attempt to sue Matrix for discrimination. All of these tactics failed.

In summer 2010, Cornerstone Church announced plans to sell WMNT-CA. The buyer was Community Broadcasting Co., a firm headed by Atlanta-based media consultant Jesse Weatherby and Toledo-area minister and former Toledo Blade sales executive Rev. Jerry Jones. They completed the sale by January 2011 at a reported price of $1.00. Community Broadcast Group had been operating WMNT under a time brokerage agreement after the sale was announced. It restored the station's analog channel 48 signal in August 2010, after Cornerstone Church filed a notification in June of ceasing the station's operations due to technical reasons.

On March 3, 2013, WMNT-CA flash-cut to digital operations, continuing on UHF channel 48.

In October 2014, Community Broadcast Group announced that WMNT-CA would be sold to Novia Communications, LLC at a price of $400,000. The sale was never consummated.

In January 2020, WMNT-CD dropped MyNetworkTV programming for a full-time paid programming schedule, but returned a new syndicated schedule with MyNetworkTV returning to prime time in September. No explanation of the nine-month break in programming has been given by CBG.

== Subchannels ==
The station's signal is multiplexed:

Subchannels of WMNT-CD
Subchannel	Res.	Short name	Programming
48.1	480i	My TV	MyNetworkTV (8p–10p); Shop LC (10p–8p) (4:3)
48.2	480i	AntenTV	Antenna TV (4:3)
48.3	480i	This TV	[Blank] (4:3)
48.4	480i	GetTV	Defy (4:3)
48.5	480i	The Gri	Outlaw (4:3)
48.6	480i	Shop LC	Shop LC (4:3)
48.7	480i	NewsNet	MovieSphere Gold (4:3)
48.8	480i	Sports	Cozi TV (4:3)
48.9	480i	COZI TV	Jewelry TV (4:3)

== See also ==
- WPAY 1520 (WMNT's former radio sister station, now a "Relevant Radio" station)
- WNKL 96.9 (WMNT's former radio sister station, owned by Educational Media Foundation. It used to be WXQQ "Q-96-Nine", a Contemporary Hit/Dance (CHR/D) Radio station.)
- Channel 36 digital TV stations in the United States
- Channel 36 low-power TV stations in the United States
- Channel 48 virtual TV stations in the United States
- Channel 58 branded TV stations in the United States
