= The Making of Milwaukee =

- Written by: John Gurda
- Narrated by: John Gurda
- Distributed by: Milwaukee PBS
- Release date: October 2006
- Running time: 4 Hours & 50 Minutes
- Country: United States
- Language: English

The Making of Milwaukee is a 2006 television series by Milwaukee PBS. The series are based on John Gurda's book and is narrated by the author himself. It is an Emmy Award-winning documentary series.

== See also ==
- History of Milwaukee
- Milwaukee PBS
