= Milwaukee Area Technical College =

Vocational school in Milwaukee, Wisconsin, US

Coordinates: 43°2′35.3″N 87°55′13.8″W

- Type: Community college
- Established: 1912
- President: Anthony Cruz
- Students: 31,112 (spring 2025)
- Location: Milwaukee, Wisconsin, United States
- Campus: Urban and suburban
- Website: www.matc.edu

Milwaukee Area Technical College (or MATC) is a public two-year vocational-technical and community college based in Milwaukee, Wisconsin, United States. MATC offers day, evening, weekend and online classes at campuses in downtown Milwaukee, Oak Creek, West Allis, and Mequon as well as an education center in the Walker's Square neighborhood on Milwaukee's near south side.

MATC offers over more than 180 accredited associate degrees, technical diplomas and certificates. MATC also offers short-term badges, GED and HSED classes, high school diplomas through its Adult High School program, and English as a Second Language programs. More than 30,000 students are enrolled each year, with a majority of students identifying as students of color.

== History ==
Milwaukee Area Technical College traces its roots to a 1911 Wisconsin law whose purpose was to encourage young adults who dropped out of high school to work full-time to continue their education part-time. Employers were required to allow workers to attend and students could participate in the evenings.

In 1912, the Milwaukee Continuation School opened near Mason Street and the Milwaukee River. Its name was changed to the Milwaukee Vocational School in 1916 as trade skills were emphasized. Enrollment grew quickly, and in 1920–28, a new six-story building was completed at 6th & State Street–the core of what is now the Downtown campus. An influx of adult students led to a new name in 1948, Milwaukee Vocational and Adult School.

With a growth in technical courses, the name became Milwaukee Vocational, Adult and Technical School in 1964. In 1968, it merged with the Milwaukee Institute of Technology (founded in 1951) to become Milwaukee Technical College. The following year, it merged with the other vocational schools in the metropolitan area to form Milwaukee Area Technical College, which became a member of the statewide Vocational, Technical and Adult Education System (now the Wisconsin Technical College System).

One of the buildings they have is located at 1027 N. 7th Street, this used to be the home of Kalmbach Publishing and housed the offices of both Model Railroader and Trains, and was the first home to the original Milwaukee, Racine & Troy Railroad on the 3rd floor.

== Academics ==
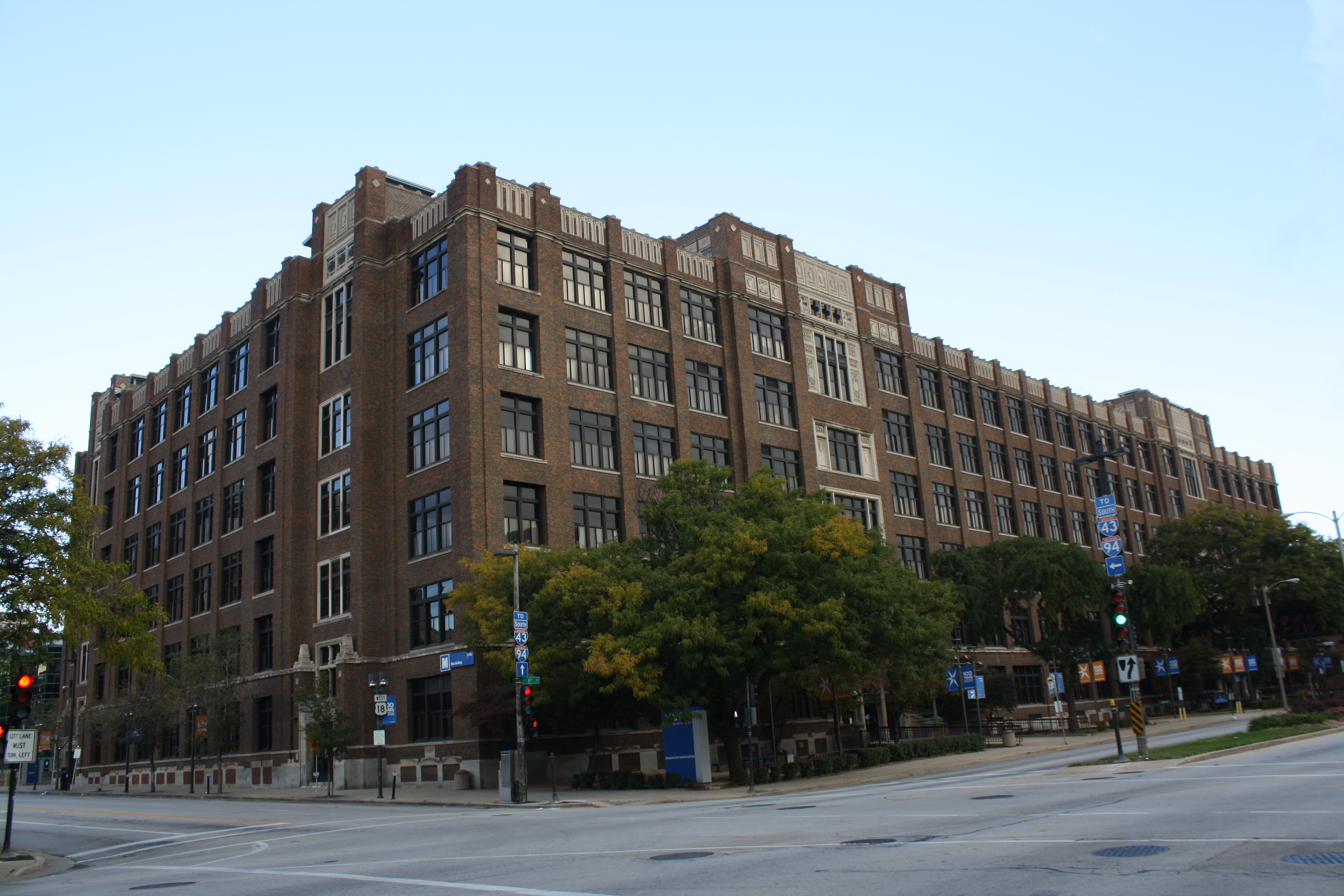
Downtown Milwaukee campus

The MATC District is one of 16 districts that make up the Wisconsin Technical College System (WTCS). The district covers all of Milwaukee County, the southern two-thirds of Ozaukee County and parts of Washington County. It is governed by a nine-member board composed of residents of the district. Board members serve without pay and are appointed to three-year terms by an appointment committee that consists of elected officials from the 21 school districts within the MATC District.

One of MATC's educational outreach programs is the operation of the two PBS stations serving Milwaukee and southeastern Wisconsin. The stations, WMVS channel 10 and WMVT channel 36, are known collectively as Milwaukee PBS. In 1992, in partnership with Zenith Electronics and AT&T, Channel 10 produced the nation's first test broadcast of a digital television signal. In March 2000, the station became the first in Wisconsin to begin regular broadcast of digital, high-definition programs. MATC entered the wireless digital era in 2003, becoming the first college in Wisconsin to provide wireless Internet service throughout all campuses.
