= Channel 13 branded TV stations in the United States =

The following television stations in the United States brand as channel 13 (though neither using virtual channel 13 nor broadcasting on physical RF channel 13):

The following television stations in Mexico brand as channel 13 (though neither using virtual channel 13 nor broadcasting on physical RF channel 13):

- XHDTV-TDT in Tecate, Baja California, serving Tijuana, Baja California/San Diego, California, United States

The following television stations in the United States formerly branded as channel 13:

- KPSE-LD in Palm Springs, California
- WSCG in Baxley, Georgia
