= Channel 50 virtual TV stations in the United States =

The following television stations operate on virtual channel 50 in the United States:

- K29NN-D in Lucerne Valley, California
- K33OB-D in Roswell, New Mexico
- K33OK-D in Overton, Nevada
- K36KW-D in Redwood Falls, Minnesota
- KASY-TV in Albuquerque, New Mexico
- KBAB-LD in Santa Barbara, California
- KDHU-LD in Houston, Texas
- KDOS-LD in Globe, Arizona
- KDVD-LD in Globe, Arizona
- KEJT-CD in Salt Lake City, Utah
- KEMO-TV in Santa Rosa, California
- KJLN-LD in Joplin, Missouri
- KKAI in Kailua, Hawaii
- KLSV-LD in Las Vegas, Nevada
- KLWB in New Iberia, Louisiana
- KOCE-TV in Huntington Beach, California
- KOPS-LD in Beaumont, Texas
- KPSE-LD in Palm Springs, California
- KPXE-TV in Kansas City, Missouri
- KRMV-LD in Riverside, California
- KSDY-LD in San Diego, California
- KTCJ-LD in Minneapolis, Minnesota
- KTFD-TV in Denver, Colorado
- KTGF-LD in Great Falls, Montana
- WASV-LD in Asheville, North Carolina
- WBNM-LD in Louisville, Kentucky
- WDCW in Washington, D.C.
- WHOB-LD in Buxton, North Carolina
- WKBD-TV in Detroit, Michigan
- WKDC-LD in Columbia, South Carolina
- WNGS-LD in Greenville, South Carolina
- WNJN in Montclair, New Jersey
- WOKZ-CD in Kalamazoo, Michigan
- WPGA-LD in Macon, Georgia
- WPGD-TV in Hendersonville, Tennessee
- WPWR-TV in Gary, Indiana
- WPXB-LD in Daytona Beach, Florida
- WPXX-TV in Memphis, Tennessee
- WQHA in Aguada, Puerto Rico
- WRAZ in Raleigh, North Carolina
- WRUG-LD in Baton Rouge, Louisiana
- WTOO-CD in Bolivar, Pennsylvania
- WTZP-LD in Portsmouth, Ohio
- WVQS-LD in Isabel Segunda, Puerto Rico
- WVEA-TV in Tampa, Florida
- WWJE-DT in Derry, New Hampshire
- WWTI in Watertown, New York

The following stations, which are no longer licensed, formerly operated on virtual channel 50:

- KATA-CD in Mesquite, Texas
- WAGC-LD in Atlanta, Georgia
