= KEVC-CD =

Television station in Indio, California

- Indio–Palm Springs, California; United States
- City: Indio, California
- Channels: Digital: 36 (UHF); Virtual: 5
- Branding: UniMás Palm Springs

Programming
- Affiliations: 5.1: UniMás; for others, see § Subchannels

Ownership
- Owner: Entravision Communications; (Entravision Holdings, LLC)
- Sister stations: KVER-CD, KMIR-TV, KPSE-LD

History
- Founded: January 26, 1994
- First air date: September 27, 1999
- Former call signs: K05JY (1994–2001); KEVC-CA (2001–2015); KEVC-LD (2015)
- Former channel numbers: Analog: 5 (VHF, 1999–2015)
- Former affiliations: Spanish music videos (1999–2002); TeleFutura (2002–2013)
- Call sign meaning: Entravision Communications (owner)

Technical information
- Licensing authority: FCC
- Facility ID: 51656
- Class: CD
- ERP: 5.8 kW
- HAAT: 192.4 m (631 ft)
- Transmitter coordinates: 33°51′56.1″N 116°26′1″W
- Translator(s): KVER-CD 41.2 Indio

Links
- Public license information: Public file; LMS

KEVC-CD (channel 5) is a low-power, Class A television station licensed to Indio, California, United States, serving the Palm Springs Area as an affiliate of the Spanish-language network UniMás. It is owned by Entravision Communications alongside Univision affiliate KVER-CD (channel 41), NBC affiliate KMIR-TV (channel 36), and KPSE-LD (channel 50), an independent station with MyNetworkTV. KEVC and KVER share studios on Corporate Way in Palm Desert; KMIR and KPSE maintain separate facilities on Parkview Drive, also in Palm Desert. KEVC's transmitter is located atop Edom Hill in Cathedral City.

== Subchannels ==
The station's digital signal is multiplexed:

Subchannels of KEVC-CD
Channel	Res.	Short name	Programming
5.1	1080i	UniMas	UniMás
5.5	480i	Audio	KLOB 94.7
5.88	1080i	AltaVsn	AltaVision

Subchannel broadcast with MPEG-4 video
