= Channel 36 TV stations in Mexico =

The following television stations broadcast on digital channel 36 in Mexico:

- XHA-TDT in Durango, Durango
- XHACC-TDT in Acapulco, Guerrero
- XHAOX-TDT in Oaxaca, Oaxaca
- XHATJ-TDT in Atotonilco el Alto, Jalisco
- XHBE-TDT in Coatzacoalcos, Veracruz
- XHCAS-TDT in Caborca, Sonora
- XHCAW-TDT in Ciudad Acuña, Coahuila
- XHCCH-TDT in Ciudad Cuauhtémoc, Chihuahua
- XHCCU-TDT in Cancún, Quintana Roo
- XHCDO-TDT in Ciudad Obregón, Sonora
- XHCHC-TDT in Ciudad Camargo, Chihuahua
- XHCJH-TDT in Ciudad Juárez, Chihuahua
- XHCTUR-TDT in Uruapan, Michoacán
- XHCTVL-TDT in Villahermosa, Tabasco
- XHDY-TDT in San Cristóbal de Las Casas, Chiapas
- XHIV-TDT in Zacatecas, Zacatecas
- XHJU-TDT in Tapachula, Chiapas
- XHKG-TDT in Tepic, Nayarit
- XHMAP-TDT in Monclova, Coahuila
- XHMAW-TDT in Manzanillo, Colima
- XHPAT-TDT in Puerto Ángel, Oaxaca
- XHPBMY-TDT in Monterrey, Nuevo León
- XHPHG-TDT in Pachuca, Hidalgo
- XHPVT-TDT in Puerto Vallarta, Jalisco
- XHQUE-TDT in Querétaro, Querétaro
- XHREY-TDT in Reynosa, Tamaulipas
- XHSMT-TDT in San Miguel Tlacotepec, Oaxaca
- XHTM-TDT in Altzomoni, México
- XHTMGJ-TDT in León, Guanajuato
- XHTOK-TDT on Jocotitlán, State of Mexico
- XHTSCO-TDT in Saltillo, Coahuila
- XHUT-TDT in Ciudad Victoria, Tamaulipas
- XHVSL-TDT in Ciudad Valles, San Luis Potosí
- XHZIM-TDT in Zinapécuaro, Michoacán
