= KPST-FM =

Radio station in Coachella, California

- Coachella, California; United States
- Broadcast area: Palm Springs, California; Coachella Valley
- Frequency: 103.5 MHz
- Branding: Fuego FM 103.5

Programming
- Language: Bilingual
- Format: Rhythmic CHR
- Affiliations: Fuego FM

Ownership
- Owner: Entravision Communications; (Entravision Holdings, LLC)
- Sister stations: KLOB

History
- First air date: June 1, 2012
- Call sign meaning: Palm Springs and Thermal

Technical information
- Licensing authority: FCC
- Facility ID: 189509
- Class: A
- ERP: 1,900 watts
- HAAT: 179 meters (587 ft)
- Transmitter coordinates: 33°39′23″N 116°59′29″W
- Translator: KVER-CD 41.6 Palm Springs

Links
- Public license information: Public file; LMS

KPST-FM (103.5 FM) is a radio station licensed to Coachella, California, United States, and serving the Palm Springs Area. Owned by Entravision Communications, it airs a Bilingual Rhythmic CHR format branded as "Fuego 103.5". The station's studios are located in Palm Desert, while the transmitter is located in a mountain range east of Mecca, and within proximity to Interstate 10. The station is unusual in having its programming relayed onto a digital television station, using PSIP channel 41.6 on KVER-CD to distribute its programming instead of having an HD Radio transmitter.

== History ==
=== Early years (2012–2020) ===
The station is one of the newest full power stations to the area, having received a construction permit in early 2012. It was assigned the KPST-FM call letters on May 15, 2012. While it was originally due to sign on in 2015, it received its broadcast license ahead of schedule on June 1, 2012, signing on that same day with a Regional Mexican format. The station has kept the same call letters throughout its existence.

=== CHR era (2021–present) ===
On March 29, 2021, at midnight, KPST-FM flipped to a CHR format, branded as Fuego FM. The change comes with the pending sale of KRCK-FM to VCY America, after which time KPST-FM will become the de facto CHR station. On that same day, the station picked up the syndicated Shoboy program for mornings.

Today, the station airs a Bilingual Rhythmic music presentation with songs in both English and Spanish.
