= W36AC =

Television station in McComb, Mississippi (1984–2019)

- McComb, Mississippi; United States
- Channels: Analog: 36 (UHF)

Ownership
- Owner: Reach High Media Group; (Digital Networks-Southeast, LLC)

History
- First air date: May 1984
- Last air date: October 3, 2019
- Former affiliations: SelecTV (1984–1988); Tempo (1988–1991); TBN (1991–2010)

Technical information
- Facility ID: 68072
- Class: TX
- ERP: 24.3 kW
- HAAT: 180 m (590 ft)
- Transmitter coordinates: 31°19′00″N 90°27′5″W

W36AC (channel 36) was a low-power television station in McComb, Mississippi, United States. Originally a locally run station, it was later owned by the Trinity Broadcasting Network and by several groups after TBN spun off its nearly 150 translator stations. It broadcast from 1984 to October 3, 2019.

== History ==
Commonwealth Venture Systems, Inc., associated with the McComb Enterprise-Journal newspaper, received a construction permit for a new low-power TV station on channel 36 on August 9, 1983. It was one of 23 channels that Commonwealth had applied for in Pike County. The station would operate as a scrambled subscription television operation, using programming from SelecTV. The station began broadcasting in May 1984 and aired almost all of SelecTV's output to paying subscribers, with the exception of its X-rated movies.

W36AC continued with SelecTV for more than four years, even though it peaked at 1,500 to 2,000 subscribers and never turned a profit in its entire time as a subscription service. This fell far short of expectations; in 1984, Commonwealth forecast 3,000 subscribers by year's end and a goal of 4,000 to 6,000. In September 1988, W36AC converted to conventional operation as a community-oriented independent, using programming from Tempo.

In January 1991, Commonwealth Venture Systems reached a deal to sell W36AC to the Trinity Broadcasting Network, having failed to make a commercially successful business of the low-power station.

TBN closed down many of its low-power repeaters in 2010 due to ongoing economic problems. 147 of these repeaters would be donated by TBN to the Minority Media and Television Council (MMTC), an organization designed to preserve equal opportunity and civil rights in the media. 74 of these stations were sold to Digital Networks, a division of Luken Communications of Chattanooga, Tennessee. While Luken announced plans to convert the stations to digital, such a change never materialized. On October 3, 2019, Luken—which renamed itself Reach High Media Group in December of that year—filed to take W36AC silent for "corporate restructuring and system upgrades"; it never returned, and the station was deleted on February 25, 2021.
