= KLVX =

Television station in Las Vegas

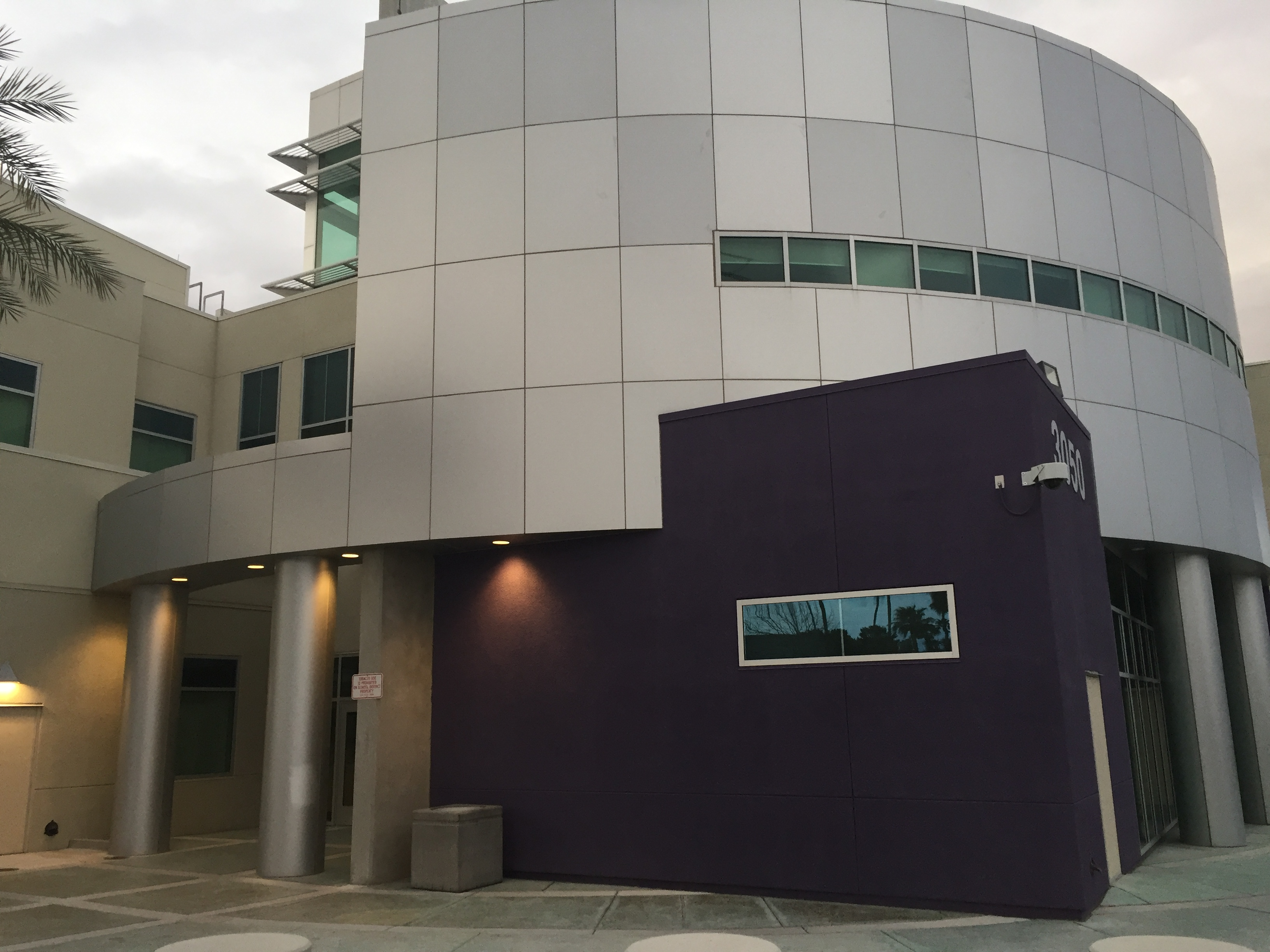
- KLVX originates from the Educational Technology Center in Paradise
- Las Vegas, Nevada; United States
- Channels: Digital: 11 (VHF); Virtual: 10
- Branding: Vegas PBS

Programming
- Affiliations: 10.1: PBS; for others, see § Subchannels

Ownership
- Owner: KLVX Communications Group; (Clark County School District)

History
- First air date: March 25, 1968
- Former channel numbers: Analog: 10 (VHF, 1968–2009)
- Former affiliations: NET (1968–1970)
- Call sign meaning: Las Vegas X; "X" is the Roman numeral for 10

Technical information
- Licensing authority: FCC
- Facility ID: 11683
- ERP: 105 kW
- HAAT: 367.5 m (1,206 ft)
- Transmitter coordinates: 36°0′26.9″N 115°0′26.9″W
- Translator(s): see § Translators

Links
- Public license information: Public file; LMS
- Website: www.vegaspbs.org

KLVX (channel 10), branded as Vegas PBS, is a PBS member television station in Las Vegas, Nevada, United States. It is the flagship outlet of the KLVX Communications Group, a subsidiary of the Clark County School District. KLVX's studios are located at the Vegas PBS Educational Technology Campus on East Flamingo Road in Paradise, and its transmitter is located on a peak near Black Mountain, southwest of I-11 near Henderson.

After plans for a statewide educational television system failed to materialize, Clark County schools pursued the construction of the city's reserved channel 10 on their own. KLVX began broadcasting on March 25, 1968, and was the only public television station in Nevada for the first 15 years of its existence. It operated from a facility in Henderson for its first decade before moving to new studios in 1978.

Under general manager Tom Axtell, who led KLVX for 26 years, the station increased its ratings, began digital telecasting, and moved into its present studios in 2009. In addition to broadcasting, Vegas PBS serves as a distributor of educational media and has a role in Clark County emergency operations.

== History ==
=== Construction and early years ===
In Nevada, proposals for educational television service first emerged in 1964, when the University of Nevada Board of Regents considered a plan to build Reno's educational channel 5 and Las Vegas's educational channel 10 as a statewide system, connected by a microwave link. A year later, in December 1965, the Clark County School District approved a multi-phase plan to build channel 10, as well as Instructional Television Fixed Service (ITFS) channels, to provide daytime service to schools and evening programming to the community. Funding from the Educational Television Facilities Act was earmarked to connect the proposed station with others in California and Utah. The school board pledged $279,000, matched with $325,000 from the federal government. The application for channel 10 was filed with the Federal Communications Commission (FCC) on June 15, 1966, and granted on February 14, 1967. During 1967, KLVX built a tower near Black Mountain, on land shared with KHBV-TV (channel 5); studios were set up in the Southern Nevada Vocational Technical Center, at Maple and Russell drives; and the district acquired 1,500 television sets for use in county classrooms.

The tower was completed at the start of 1968, and KLVX began broadcasting March 25, 1968, as the state's first educational television station. It was initially reliant on programming from National Educational Television (NET) and broadcast at night only. When classes resumed for the fall semester, instructional television for schools debuted. NET was supplanted by PBS as the network for public broadcasting in 1970. Gradually, local programs were introduced. KLVX produced the first live local telecast of high school football in 1970. A friends group to support fundraising for public TV programming, Friends of Channel 10, was formed and held its first event in 1972. In 1974, the newsmagazine Nevada Realities debuted, and the station televised coverage of the 1975 Nevada State Legislature and hearings on a consolidation of Clark County and the city of Las Vegas.

After a decade at Maple and Russell, in 1977 the Clark County school board received a federal grant to construct a new facility for KLVX, which was designed at 27,000 square feet (2,500 m^{2}). The facility near Flamingo Road and Eastern Avenue, which received a Channel 10 Drive address, opened with 20,000 square feet (1,900 m^{2}) of space; several planned energy conservation features were scrapped for cost reasons. It featured two studios, one of which housed permanent sets for the station's local programs.

In 1982, the Clark County school board considered spinning off KLVX at a time when the district was making cuts and some believed funding could be allocated to other uses. KLVX, which simultaneously saw reduced funding from the Corporation for Public Broadcasting (CPB), lost 11 positions at the time. Another effort was made in 1989 when the president of the Classroom Teachers Association recommended turning over KLVX to the University of Nevada, Las Vegas, during negotiations with the school board.

In the 1980s, time on the ITFS service—used to broadcast programs to schools during the day—was leased to a wireless cable firm, generating additional revenue. Translators began to carry KLVX's signal north to the Nevada counties of Lincoln County, Nye County, and White Pine County and Inyo County, California.

=== The Axtell era ===
In 1994, the Clark County school board split the leadership of KLVX into public and instructional roles after failing to land a candidate capable of leading both. Named as the new manager was Tom Axtell, a former general manager of WMVS in Milwaukee. Axtell diagnosed that ratings at KLVX were slightly below the average for a PBS station. In the wake of Axtell's takeover, several new programs debuted on the station's lineup, including Eye on Washington, which provided coverage of Nevada issues and lawmakers in Washington, D.C.; Outdoor Nevada; and Business in Nevada. In 1995, Capitol Issues '95 became the first public television series to air statewide on KLVX and KNPB in Reno. Axtell moved to hire KLVX's first underwriting manager. In the decade ending in 2005, KLVX moved into the top 10 in viewership among PBS member stations; increased underwriting income 468% and more than doubled operating revenue; added 16 more ITFS channels for a total of 20; and began satellite delivery of educational content to rural schools and state prisons. The increased emphasis on KLVX as a center for educational technology came after the district superintendent told Axtell upon his arrival that the station needed to provide more value to the district or it would lose its funding.

In the late 1990s, reduced state funding for station operations and distance education forced cuts and cancellations of nearly all of KLVX's local programs. In 1999, 28 positions were cut, though all were offered other jobs in the Clark County School District, and Outdoor Nevada, the Hispanic public affairs show Ventana, the Black public affairs show Community Matters, and Business in Nevada were canceled. Several educational programs, such as the high school quiz bowl game Varsity Quiz, were saved by a grant from Station Casinos. In 2006, the station rebranded as Vegas PBS.

KLVX began broadcasting a digital signal on its 34th anniversary, March 25, 2002, on channel 11. Using technology supplied at no cost by companies that exhibited at trade shows and conventions in the Las Vegas area such as the Consumer Electronics Show and NAB Show, KLVX set up a regional datacasting network for first responders utilizing unused transmission capacity on the digital signal. The Digital Emergency Alert System datacast was conceived as a backup to cellular communications in the event of an emergency that could overwhelm or damage networks. As video-on-demand and internet delivery supplanted the ITFS service, the channels in the ITFS band, later renamed Educational Broadband Service (EBS), were leased to Sprint Corporation and Clearwire in 2007 so the spectrum could be used to provide WiMax service.

Vegas PBS continued to increase its educational portfolio. In 2004, the station opened a library of described and captioned media for the hearing and visually impaired. When Nevada lawmakers' cuts to prison funding eliminated the workforce used to translate educational materials into Braille, KLVX picked up the responsibility, with a full-time employee. Amid the Great Recession, KLVX launched an online workforce training portal. These resources increased Vegas PBS's earned income to nearly half of the station's revenue by 2014.

=== New studios and new management ===
Axtell perceived the 1978-built public television center as inadequate, in large part because space and features had been cut before it was even built and also due to changing technologies. It also suffered from a leaky swamp cooler, resulting in mold and sick building syndrome. As early as 2000, planning for a new studio facility began. In 2004, Axtell announced a project to build KLVX facilities as part of a new education technology campus to be located on school district–owned land at McLeod Drive and Flamingo Road. Vegas PBS moved into the $42 million center in 2009. It was the world's first LEED Gold–certified broadcast facility and featured a geothermal system with 202 wells, reducing energy costs.

After 34 years on the air, Nevada Week in Review went on hiatus in 2015 for financial reasons. From 2015 to 2016, KLVX and KNPB jointly produced Ralston Live, featuring Nevada political columnist Jon Ralston. The program was canceled because of the expense of crews in Las Vegas and Reno and because, per Axtell, its partisan content did not sit well with PBS programming. Outdoor Nevada, one of the programs canceled in the 1999 cuts, was revived in 2015. A successor program to Nevada Week in Review, Nevada Week, began broadcasting in 2018.

Axtell retired in 2020. Mare Mazur, a former general manager of KAET, was named general manager of Vegas PBS. Mazur retired in 2026.

In fiscal year 2024, Vegas PBS received 12 percent of its funding from the since-dissolved CPB.

== Local programming ==
In addition to Nevada Week, KLVX produces the interview spinoff Nevada Week In Person, Outdoor Nevada, and Vegas All In. It also airs several school-oriented programs, including Student Spotlight and the Clark County Spelling Bee. KLVX telecasts the finals of Varsity Quiz, a high school quiz bowl tournament for Clark County schools, established in 1969, and Junior Varsity Quiz, its middle school equivalent.

== Technical information ==
=== Subchannels ===
KLVX is broadcast from a transmitter near Black Mountain, southwest of I-11 near Henderson. The station's signal is multiplexed:

Subchannels of KLVX
Subchannel	Res.	Short name	Programming
10.1	1080i	KLVX-HD	PBS
10.2	480i	Create	Create
10.3	480i	PBSKids	PBS Kids
10.4	480i	WORLD	World

=== Analog-to-digital conversion ===
KLVX shut down its analog signal, over VHF channel 10, on June 12, 2009, the official date on which full-power television stations in the United States transitioned from analog to digital broadcasts under federal mandate. The station's digital signal remained on its pre-transition VHF channel 11, using virtual channel 10.

=== Translators ===
A network of translators carries KLVX's signal into areas northwest of Las Vegas, eastern Nevada, and one community in Arizona.

- Alamo, etc.: K08PE-D
- Caliente: K36PX-D
- Chloride, Arizona: K32DW-D
- Ely: K26HY-D
- Ely & McGill: K13NR-D
- Glendale: K27JK-D
- Indian Springs: K08PG-D
- Jean: K34LI-D
- Laughlin: K06PG-D
- Lund & Preston: K27OH-D
- Mesquite: K25LU-D
- Pahrump: K28CS-D
- Panaca: K32OB-D
- Pioche: K36PU-D
- Ruth: K13NQ-D
- Ursine: K36OF-D
