= WCEA-LD =

Television station in Boston

- Boston, Massachusetts; United States
- Channels: Digital: 36 (UHF); Virtual: 26
- Branding: Cuencavision; MAS TV

Programming
- Affiliations: 26.1: Spanish independent; for others, see § Subchannels

Ownership
- Owner: C&M Broadcasting Corporation

History
- First air date: 1986
- Former call signs: W19AH (1986–1995); WCEA-LP (1995–2011)
- Former channel numbers: Analog: 19 (UHF, 1986–2002), 3 (VHF, 2002), 58 (UHF, 2002–2011); Digital: 58 (UHF, 2011–2018), 45 (UHF, 2012–2021)
- Former affiliations: Telemundo (1990s–1995)
- Call sign meaning: Cuenca

Technical information
- Licensing authority: FCC
- Facility ID: 168497
- Class: LD
- ERP: 15 kW
- HAAT: 234.2 m (768 ft)
- Transmitter coordinates: 42°20′57″N 71°4′29″W

Links
- Public license information: LMS
- Website: www.cuencavisiontv.com

WCEA-LD (channel 26) is a low-power Spanish-language independent television station in Boston, Massachusetts, United States. Owned by C&M Broadcasting Corporation, it is a sister property to El Planeta, a local Spanish-language newspaper. The station's studios are located on Albany Street in Boston's Roxbury neighborhood; while its transmitter is located atop the John Hancock Tower in the Back Bay.

== History ==
WCEA-LD was founded by Pedro Nicolas Cuenca in 1986 as W19AH, becoming WCEA-LP in 1995. It has always been a platform for local multicultural independent producers in the Boston market. The station also served as Boston's Telemundo affiliate in the early 1990s, before W32AY (now WYCN-LD in Providence, Rhode Island) signed on in 1995.

Initially broadcasting on channel 19, WCEA-LP was forced to vacate the channel to accommodate the digital signal of WGBH-TV. In 2002, it moved to channel 3 via special temporary authority, but its application for the channel was subsequently dismissed by the Federal Communications Commission due to objections from other Boston stations, AT&T Broadband, and RCN; soon thereafter, WCEA-LP relocated to channel 58.

Since December 2010, Massachusetts Spanish TV Network (MAS TV) has partnered with WCEA-LD to provide programming, including local newscasts at 6 a.m. and noon.

In the early 2010s, WCEA-LP had two applications convert to digital operations on channels 44 and 45, with both specifying a transmitter location atop the John Hancock Tower; the station ultimately chose to build the channel 45 facility.

== Subchannels ==
The station's signal is multiplexed:

Subchannels of WCEA-LD
Subchannel	Res.	Short name	Programming
26.1	480i	WCEA	Main WCEA-LD programming
26.2	480i	TELESUR	Telesur
26.3	480i	Caribe	Cristovision (Spanish religious) (4:3)
26.6	480i	CVI	TeleAntilles (4:3)
