= WMKE-CD =

Television station in Milwaukee

- Milwaukee, Wisconsin; United States
- Channels: Digital: 36 (UHF); Virtual: 21

Programming
- Affiliations: 21.1: Jewelry Television; for others, see § Subchannels

Ownership
- Owner: CNZ Communications; (Milwaukee Media, LLC)

History
- First air date: November 1985
- Former call signs: W08BY (1985–1994); WMKE-LP (1994–2001); WMKE-CA (2001–2015)
- Former channel numbers: Analog: 8 (VHF, 1985–2000), 7 (VHF, 2000–2014); Digital: 21 (UHF, 2015–2020)
- Former affiliations: MuchMusic (1985–1990); The Box (1990–2001); MTV2 (2001–2006); America One (2006–2012); Gem Shopping Network (2012–2014); Soul of the South (2015–2016); Rev'n (2016–2018); Quest (2018–2019); NewsNet (2021–2022); Court TV (2020–2022)
- Call sign meaning: The city of license of Milwaukee, and General Mitchell International Airport's IATA airport code

Technical information
- Licensing authority: FCC
- Facility ID: 35091
- Class: CD
- ERP: 15 kW
- HAAT: 126.4 m (415 ft)
- Transmitter coordinates: 43°5′46.2″N 87°54′15″W

Links
- Public license information: Public file; LMS

WMKE-CD (channel 21) is a low-power, Class A television station in Milwaukee, Wisconsin, United States. Owned by CNZ Communications, it has studios on West Stratton Drive in suburban New Berlin and a transmitter at the Milwaukee PBS tower on Milwaukee's northeast side.

== History ==
The station first signed on the air as W08BY in November 1985, broadcasting on VHF channel 8 under the ownership of Dothan, Alabama–based broadcaster Charles Woods. It offered a mix of locally produced programming, public domain movies and television series, and music videos, with the rest of its broadcast day filled by programming from the Canadian music video channel MuchMusic. Woods sold the station to KM Communications in 1990; the same year MuchMusic programming was dropped, and replaced with the viewer request music network The Box. After The Box was acquired by Viacom in 2001, the station became an MTV2 affiliate with some programming in Korean (the owners of KM Communications were Korean Americans). In August 2000, WMKE moved to VHF channel 7 to allow for PBS member station WMVS (channel 10) to operate its digital signal on channel 8.

As an analog station, the station's transmitter was located atop the Hilton Milwaukee City Center in downtown Milwaukee (which was previously used by WVTV, channel 18, and WDJT-TV, channel 58, before both stations moved their transmitter facilities to Milwaukee's northeast side). The station's signal was directed north from that site to prevent interference with the former main digital signal of WLS-TV in Chicago (which broadcasts on virtual channel 7 and used that allocation until 2012 to carry the station inner-city after a move of the main signal to digital channel 44), and was localized to within Milwaukee County.

In 2006, WMKE-CA dropped MTV2 as well as its Korean programming and became an affiliate of America One (the network had previously been affiliated with WMLW-CA—channel 41, now WBME-CD—and its forerunner low-power station W65BT had previously carried the network until 2002). In October 2012, WMKE-CA affiliated with the Georgia-based Gem Shopping Network. Throughout all of this, the only pay TV carriage obtained by the station was over AT&T U-Verse on their channel 7 throughout southeastern Wisconsin (since removed upon the affiliation with OnTV4U). Time Warner Cable and Charter have never carried the station on their systems.

The station had a construction permit to operate a low-power digital signal on UHF channel 20. This permit expired on May 21, 2012, with KM Communications later re-filing to construct a digital transmitter facility on UHF channel 21.

In July 2014, the station was taken dark for financial reasons, likely due to fines from the FCC resulting from the station's lack of updates to both its public file and educational and informational programming reporting file, the latter of which had not had the public file components updated for 3 1/2 years; this resulted in a total fine of $20,000, with an appeal of the amount for financial purposes denied as the FCC determined that WMKE-CA and Chicago sister station WOCK-CD were under the same ownership and had the financial ability to pay the fine.

On July 30, 2014, the sale of WMKE-CA was announced for $2.5 million to LocusPoint Networks, which is known for purchasing television stations as part of the FCC's upcoming spectrum incentive auction. In January 2015, the station returned to the air on its digital channel 21 allocation from the traditional Milwaukee tower farm. It now holds the new calls WMKE-CD, as an affiliate of the Soul of the South Network. The station's digital signal is now unrestricted and fully covers the core Milwaukee metro area, including the Washington County, Waukesha County and Ozaukee County suburbs. The station at first utilized virtual channel technology to remain on channel 7, but due to multiple issues with the system, eventually decided to use their physical digital channel 21 to identify their channel instead.

Due to Soul of the South's various financial and technical issues which eventually resulted in it ending operations, WMKE eventually picked up Luken Communications' automotive-focused Rev'n network in January 2016. On April 13, 2017, the FCC announced the results of the 2016 spectrum auction; WMKE-CD did not sell any spectrum. Shortly thereafter, LocusPoint announced the sale of WMKE-CD to the Milwaukee Media subsidiary of CNZ Communications, which already owned WIWN (channel 68) in the market (the station was sold in 2024).

On February 24, 2018, the paid programming schedule of OnTV4U formerly seen on WIWN-DT3 was moved onto WMKE-CD after the launch of Quest on that signal. Quest also began simulcasting on channel 21.1, displacing Rev'n. Six additional subchannels were also added to WMKE, with some repeating WIWN's channel lineup and allowing more entertainment subchannels to air on that full-power signal. At the beginning of 2020, it switched to carrying Court TV, repeating programming seen on WTMJ-DT5; after Court TV found cable coverage in the market through WTMJ sister station WPXE-DT3, WMKE's primary affiliation switched to Jewelry Television (itself also repeating on WPXE's sixth subchannel as of March 27, 2023).

== Technical information ==
=== Subchannels ===
The station's signal is multiplexed:

Subchannels of WMKE-CD
| Subchannel | Res. | Short name | Programming |
|---|---|---|---|
| 21.1 | 720p | JTV HD | Jewelry Television |
| 21.2 | 480i | HSN2 | HSN2 (4:3) |
| 21.3 | 480i | Majestd | Majestad TV; (Spanish religious); (4:3) |
| 21.4 | 480i | SHOP_LC | Shop LC (4:3) |
| 21.5 | 480i | SHOP HQ | ShopHQ (4:3) |
| 21.6 | 480i | QVC 2 | QVC2 (4:3) |
| 21.7 | 480i | LATV | LATV (4:3) |
| 21.8 | 480i | QVC OTA | QVC (4:3) |
