= KVER-CD =

Television station in Indio, California

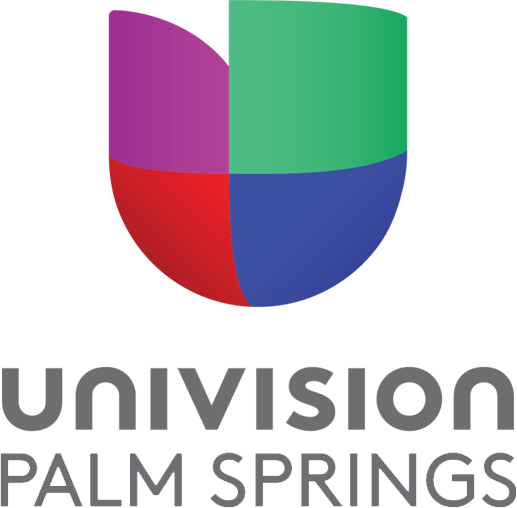
- Indio–Palm Springs, California; United States
- City: Indio, California
- Channels: Digital: 27 (UHF); Virtual: 41
- Branding: Univision Palm Springs (general); Noticias Univision Notivalle (newscasts)

Programming
- Affiliations: 41.1: Univision; for others, see § Subchannels

Ownership
- Owner: Entravision Communications; (Entravision Holdings, LLC)
- Sister stations: KEVC-CD, KMIR-TV, KPSE-LD

History
- Founded: February 14, 1989
- Former call signs: K04NT (1989–1995); KVER-LP (1995–2001); KVER-CA (2001–2018)
- Former channel numbers: Analog: 4 (VHF, 1989–2014); Digital: 41 (UHF, 2014–2019)
- Call sign meaning: The Spanish word ver, "to watch"

Technical information
- Licensing authority: FCC
- Facility ID: 69753
- Class: CD
- ERP: 15 kW
- HAAT: 191.9 m (630 ft)
- Transmitter coordinates: 33°51′56″N 116°26′1″W

Links
- Public license information: Public file; LMS
- Website: noticiaspalmsprings.com

KVER-CD (channel 41) is a low-power, Class A television station licensed to Indio, California, United States, serving the Palm Springs Area as an affiliate of the Spanish-language network Univision. It is owned by Entravision Communications alongside UniMás affiliate KEVC-CD (channel 5), NBC affiliate KMIR-TV (channel 36), and KPSE-LD (channel 50), an independent station with MyNetworkTV. KVER-CD and KEVC-CD share studios on Corporate Way in Palm Desert; KMIR-TV and KPSE-LD maintain separate facilities on Parkview Drive, also in Palm Desert. KVER-CD's transmitter is located atop Edom Hill in Cathedral City.

KVER's signal was formerly relayed on low-power translator KVES-LD (channel 28) in Palm Springs.

== Subchannels ==
The station's signal is multiplexed:

Subchannels of KVER-CD
Channel	Res.	Short name	Programming
41.1	1080i	Univisn	Univision
41.2	480i	Unimas	UniMás (KEVC-CD)
41.3	480i	Escape	Ion Mystery
41.4	480i	ION	Ion
41.5	480i	LATV	LATV
41.6	480i	KPST	KPST-FM / Fuego 103.5

Simulcast of subchannel of another station
