= WSPF-CD =

Television station in St. Petersburg, Florida

- St. Petersburg–Tampa, Florida; United States
- City: St. Petersburg, Florida
- Channels: Digital: 36 (UHF); Virtual: 35

Programming
- Affiliations: 35.1: TCT; for others, see § Subchannels

Ownership
- Owner: Total Christian Television; (Faith Broadcasting Network, Inc.)

History
- First air date: 1989
- Former call signs: W35AJ (1989–1999); WSPF-LP (1999–2001); WSPF-CA (2001–2012)
- Former channel numbers: Analog: 35 (UHF, 1989–2012); Digital: 38 (UHF, 2012–2020)
- Former affiliations: Channel America (1989–1995); St. Petersburg city public access (1995–2012); MundoFox–MundoMax (2013–2016); América Tevé (2016–2022)
- Call sign meaning: St. Petersburg, Florida

Technical information
- Licensing authority: FCC
- Facility ID: 11559
- Class: CD
- ERP: 9.1 kW
- HAAT: 384.9 m (1,263 ft)
- Transmitter coordinates: 27°49′10.8″N 82°15′38″W

Links
- Public license information: Public file; LMS

WSPF-CD (channel 35) is a low-power, Class A religious television station licensed to St. Petersburg, Florida, United States, serving the Tampa Bay area. The station is owned by Total Christian Television (TCT). WSPF-CD's transmitter is located in Riverview, Florida.

== History ==
WSPF-CD logo used until 2022, when the América Tevé affiliation moved to the station's fifth subchannel.

The station first signed on the air in 1989 as W35AJ, which originally operated as an owned-and-operated station of Channel America (in effect, becoming the first network-owned commercial station in the Tampa Bay market). However, the station was operated only intermittently, and would be off the air for weeks at a time. W35AJ was already dark for a couple of years when the St. Petersburg city government acquired the station in February 1995. Until that point, St. Petersburg's government-access television channel, first established in January 1990, was seen exclusively on cable television on cable channel 15 (since moved to digital channel 615 in December 2007). Prior to then, the city presented some programs on a local origination channel on Paragon Cable (since succeeded by Bright House Networks and Charter Communications).

Under the ownership of the City of St. Petersburg, the station broadcast City Council meetings and other public service programming for area residents, including the required three weekly hours of educational programming mandated by the Federal Communications Commission (FCC). In December 1999, the station's call letters were changed to WSPF-LP. It was eventually upgraded to Class A status, resulting in the callsign being modified to WSPF-CA in 2001.

On November 3, 2011, it was announced that the City of St. Petersburg was in discussions to sell WSPF-CA to Miami Lakes–based broadcast group Prime Time Partners; the company had placed a $500,000 bid to buy the station. Prime Time Partners immediately announced plans to convert the station to digital, with a Spanish-language service broadcasting on channel 35.1. The city announced that the station was up for sale in July 2011, due to the expense of converting the station to digital. The sale to Prime Time Partners was approved by the FCC on May 29, 2012.

On or around June 30, 2012, WSPF-CA signed on its digital signal on UHF channel 38, the frequency formerly used by the analog signal of WTTA; ironically, the city of St. Petersburg founded the previous occupant of the channel 38 frequency, WSUN-TV, in 1953. In converting to digital operations, the station's call sign was modified to WSPF-CD. In addition, the station relocated its transmitter site to the antenna farm in Riverview. Shortly after digital transmissions began, WSPF-CD began broadcasting MundoFox (now MundoMax) on 35.1 and infomercials on 35.2 and 35.3. The city access channel, now known as StPeteTV, continues to be carried within the City of St. Petersburg on Bright House channel 641, WOW! channel 15 or Verizon FiOS channel 20, as well as online; it was originally announced that the city was offered a subchannel of WSPF-CD to continue carrying its city access channel terrestrially, though they ultimately chosen not to use it.

On May 30, 2014, it was announced that WSPF-CD would be carried market-wide on Bright House for its digital cable subscribers, beginning August 1.

== Subchannels ==
The station's signal is multiplexed:

Subchannels of WSPF-CD
Subchannel	Res.	Short name	Programming
35.1	1080i	WSPF-CD	TCT
35.2	480i	SBN	SonLife
35.3	480i	SHOPLC	Shop LC
35.4	480i	HSTV	Healing Streams TV
35.5	480i	WEST	WEST
35.6	480i	GODTV	GOD TV
35.7	480i	ONTV4U	Infomercials
35.8	480i	POSITIV	Positiv
