= K34QB-D =

Television station in Vail, Colorado (1992–2025)

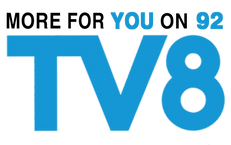
- Vail, Colorado; United States
- Channels: Digital: 34 (UHF); Virtual: 45
- Branding: TV8 (former cable channel)

Programming
- Affiliations: Independent; The Vacation Channel; Outside Television

Ownership
- Owner: Deerfield Media; (Deerfield Media (Vail), Inc.)

History
- First air date: September 17, 1992
- Last air date: March 28, 2025
- Former call signs: K45IE(-D) (2004–2020)

Technical information
- Licensing authority: FCC
- Facility ID: 128356
- Class: LD
- ERP: 0.076 kW
- HAAT: −467.8 m (−1,535 ft)
- Transmitter coordinates: 39°38′0.9″N 106°32′11.1″W
- Translator(s): K36DB-CD Avon, Vail

Links
- Public license information: LMS
- Website: www.tv8vail.com

K34QB-D (channel 45), branded TV8, was a low-power independent television station in Vail, Colorado, United States. Founded on September 17, 1992, the station was owned by Deerfield Media, a partner company of Sinclair Broadcast Group. The station could be seen throughout the Vail area on cable channel 92.

Operations of TV8 were shuttered on July 17, 2020, due to the impact on tourism caused by the COVID-19 pandemic. The transmitter had been silent since 2019 due to transmitter failure ahead of the move of the station from channel 45 to channel 34 due to the repack. The station was quietly acquired from Vail Resorts by Deerfield Media on May 27, 2021, with operations resuming shortly after that. Deerfield Media announced it would not renew its lease agreement on TV8 Vail's studios and would take the station dark on March 28, 2025, with its license returned to the Federal Communications Commission.

== Programming ==
The station produced a lifestyle/advertorial program titled Good Morning Vail along with some Spanish-language programming. Much of the rest of the station's programming consisted of syndicated lifestyle and news shows such as AgDay, U.S. Farm Report, Daily Flash, Democracy Now!, and Off Beat Cinema.

== Subchannel ==
Subchannel of K34QB-D
Channel	Res.	Short name	Programming
45.1	480i		Main K34QB-D programming
