= KKAX-LD =

Television station in Kingman, Arizona

- Kingman, Arizona; United States
- City: Hilltop, Arizona (nominal city of license)
- Channels: Digital: 36 (UHF); Virtual: 36
- Branding: Tri-State Television Network, Network 36, TV36

Programming
- Affiliations: 36.1: Independent

Ownership
- Owner: Tri-State Broadcasting, LLC

History
- Founded: November 18, 1985
- Former call signs: K36AX (1997–2002); KKAX-LP (2002–2021)
- Former channel numbers: Analog: 36 (UHF, 1987–2021)
- Former affiliations: YTA TV
- Call sign meaning: Derived from K36AX

Technical information
- Licensing authority: FCC
- Facility ID: 25422
- Class: LD
- ERP: 0.022 kW
- HAAT: 1,050.8 m (3,448 ft)
- Transmitter coordinates: 35°4′53″N 113°54′16.8″W
- Translator(s): K23BJ-D Lake Havasu City; WPYN246 Bullhead City

Links
- Public license information: LMS

KKAX-LD (channel 36) is a low-power independent television station in Kingman, Arizona, United States, nominally licensed to Hilltop, an unincorporated area within Kingman. Affiliated with YTA TV, it is operated by Tri-State Broadcasting, LLC, owned by Arizona State Mine Inspector Joe Hart and his wife Rhonda. KKAX-LD broadcasts from a transmitter located on Hayden Peak, and serves Kingman, Golden Valley and surrounding areas. The signal reaches Bullhead City and Mohave Valley via a microwave link located on Black Mountain near Oatman, and is repeated on K23BJ-D in Lake Havasu City.

== History ==
An original construction permit was granted on November 18, 1985, to Group Seven Communications of New York City. The initial callsign was designated as K36AX, to operate on channel 36. The station was to serve the Kingman area, although its city of license was to be Hilltop, and the transmitter was located on a bluff overlooking downtown Kingman. The station was licensed on August 25, 1987. Initial programming is unknown, but Group Seven Communications was recognized for its marketing emphasis toward the Hispanic community.

In September 2000, Group Seven Communications sold K36AX to Tri-State Broadcasting. In April 2002, the station moved to a new transmitter location on Getz Peak, increasing its signal coverage. And in the July 2002, the station unveiled new call letters, KKAX-LP, based on the old callsign—K36AX. KKAX-LP moved once again in September 2003 to Hayden Peak in order to have a clear microwave path to feed its translators in the neighboring communities of Bullhead City and Lake Havasu.

The station was licensed for digital operation on August 27, 2021, changing its call sign to KKAX-LD.

== Subchannels ==
Subchannels of KKAX-LD
| Subchannel | Res. | Short name | Programming |
|---|---|---|---|
| 36.1 | 480i | | Independent |
| 36.2 | 480i | | [Blank] |
| 36.3 | 480i | | [Blank] |
| 36.4 | 480i | | [Blank] |
| 36.5 | 480i | | [Blank] |
| 36.6 | 480i | | Weather |
| 36.7 | 480i | | Weather |
| 36.8 | 480i | | Weather |

== Translator ==
| City of license | Callsign | Channel | ERP | HAAT | Facility ID | Transmitter coordinates |
|---|---|---|---|---|---|---|
| Lake Havasu City | K23BJ-D | 23 | 2.41 kW | 44.1 m (145 ft) | 25428 | 34°36′9″N 114°22′16″W |
