= Milwaukee PBS =

Television stations in Milwaukee

WMVS and WMVT

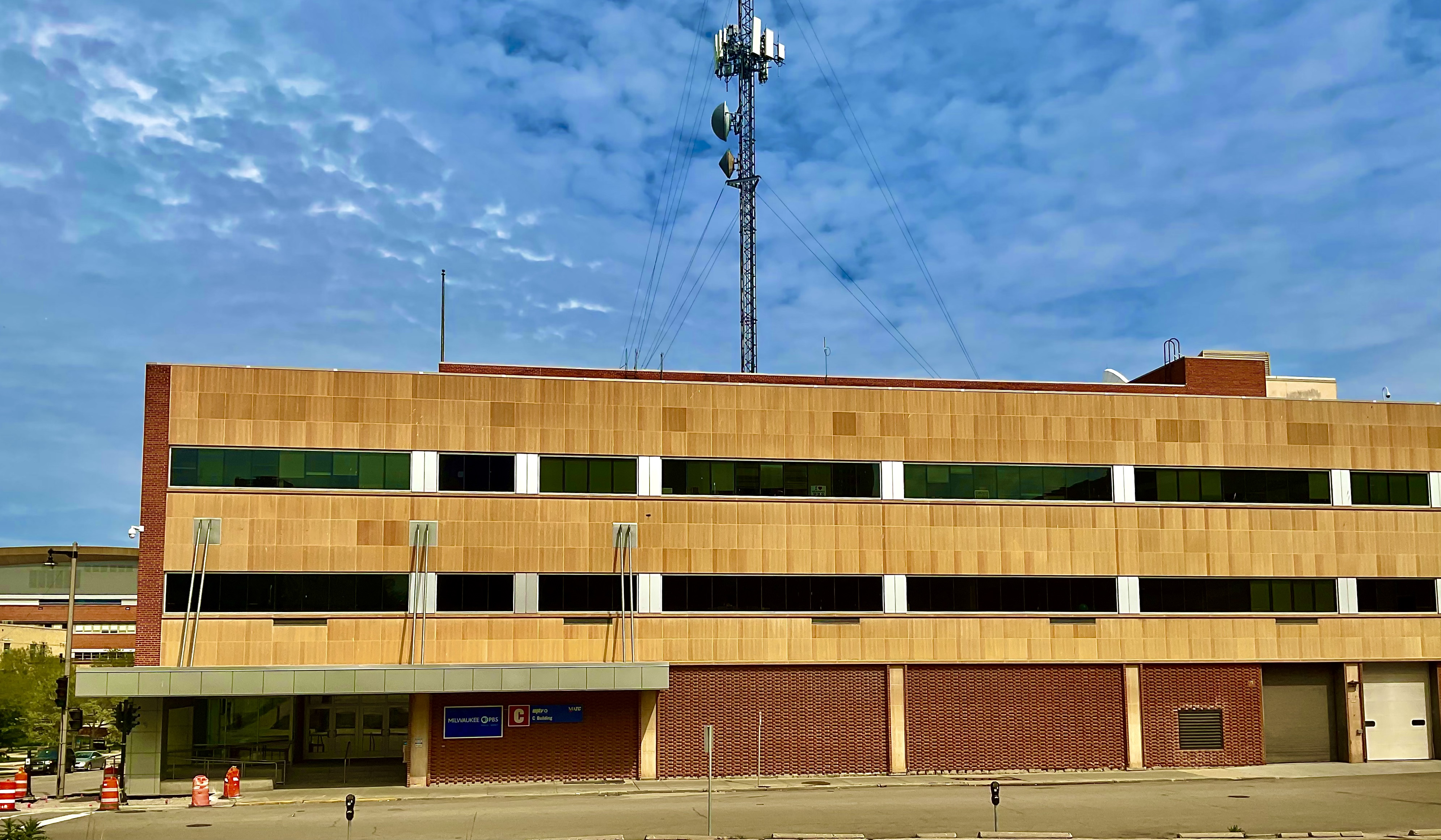
- Building C of the Milwaukee Area Technical College Downtown Campus, which contains the studios and operations center for Milwaukee PBS.

Milwaukee, Wisconsin; United States
- Channels for WMVS: Digital: 8 (VHF); Virtual: 10
- Channels for WMVT: Digital: 8 (VHF); Virtual: 36
- Branding: Milwaukee PBS

Programming
- Affiliations: 10.1: PBS; 10.2: Create; 10.3: PBS Kids; 36.1: PBS; 36.2: World; 36.3: Milwaukee PBS Weather

Ownership
- Owner: Milwaukee Area Technical College; (Milwaukee Area Technical College District Board)

History
- First air date: WMVS: October 28, 1957; WMVT: January 28, 1963
- Former call signs: WMVS: WMVS-TV (1957–1962); WMVT: WMVT-TV (June–November 1980)
- Former channel number: WMVS: Analog: 10 (VHF, 1957–2009); Digital: 36 (UHF inner-market translator WMVS-LD, 2012–2020); WMVT: Analog: 36 (UHF, 1963–2009); Digital: 35 (until 2018)
- Former affiliations: NET (1957–1970)
- Call sign meaning: WMVS: Milwaukee Vocational School, former name of MATC; WMVT: Milwaukee Vocational and Technical School, former name of MATC

Technical information
- Licensing authority: FCC
- Facility ID: WMVS: 42663; WMVT: 42665
- ERP: 32 kW
- HAAT: 357 m (1,171 ft)
- Transmitter coordinates: 43°5′46.2″N 87°54′15″W

Links
- Public license information: WMVS: Public file; LMS; WMVT: Public file; LMS
- Website: www.milwaukeepbs.org

Milwaukee PBS is the collective brand for two PBS member television stations in Milwaukee, Wisconsin, United States: WMVS (channel 10) and WMVT (channel 36). Both stations are owned and operated by the Milwaukee Area Technical College (MATC).

== Overview ==
WMVS and WMVT share studio facilities located at the Continuing Education Center (Building C) on the Milwaukee Area Technical College campus at 1036 North 8th Street in downtown Milwaukee; by the coincidence of the city's grid system, Milwaukee PBS has the unique distinction of its studio's address number incorporating the channel numbers for both of the stations (most television and radio stations that have their channel number as an address use a vanity address or street not within a community's numbering system, e.g. KLAS-TV channel 8 in Las Vegas is located on Channel 8 Drive). A second facility in suburban Brookfield a block west of the Milwaukee County line was also maintained as a production facility and donation/pick-up center for the organization's fundraising efforts, including the annual Great TV Auction until it was sold in 2018 and all efforts were moved to MATC facilities.

WMVS operates as a traditional PBS station, while WMVT brands as a more educational-oriented station with an emphasis on news, public affairs, instructional and DIY programs, along with documentaries.

The stations maintain transmitter facilities at the MPTV Tower (standing for its former branding until 2016 of Milwaukee Public Television, which was represented visually as an abbreviation), located at the northern end of Humboldt Boulevard in Milwaukee's Estabrook Park neighborhood; the facility went into service in 1999, and is owned in conjunction with the American Tower Corporation (MPTV formerly leased space on the WITI TV Tower for WMVS and WMVT's respective transmitters from the 1960s until 1981, and then WVTV's tower until 1999). Besides transmitting WMVS and WMVT, MPTV/American Tower leases tower and transmitter space on the MPTV Tower for WVTV (channels 18/24, both owned by Sinclair Broadcast Group), religious independent station WVCY-TV (channel 30, owned by VCY America), WMKE-CD (channel 21, owned by LocusPoint Networks), WPXE (channel 55, owned by Ion Media) and WTSJ-LD (channel 38, owned by DTV America).

Milwaukee PBS has some of the highest viewership of any PBS member station or network in the United States. In the February 2019 sweeps period, WMVS was the highest-rated station in the entire PBS system. The group's Great TV Auction led the nation's PBS auctions in prime time viewer ratings and was the #1 PBS auction in the nation, based on net revenue. In 2019, the Great TV Auction aired for the last time.

WMVS and WMVT are the only public television stations in Wisconsin which are not affiliated with the Madison-based PBS Wisconsin (formerly Wisconsin Public Television, a state network that was created fifteen years after the founding of WMVS, and is owned by the University of Wisconsin Extension), although Milwaukee PBS contributes to and promotes Wisconsin Educational Communications Board instructional programming within their ten-county area in lieu of PBS Wisconsin.

== History ==
WMVS first signed on the air on October 28, 1957, as the 28th educational television station in the United States and the second in Wisconsin (after WHA-TV in Madison). It was a service of the Milwaukee Vocational School, forerunner of MATC–hence its call letters. Sister station WMVT first signed on the air on January 28, 1963.

Among the strongest and earliest backers of the creation of Milwaukee Public Television (over the opposition of at least some of the area's commercial stations) was Frank Zeidler, who served as the mayor of Milwaukee from 1948 to 1960.

In 2007, WMVS celebrated its 50th anniversary of broadcasting. Upon a September 2010 realignment of its digital signal, the station's changed its on-air branding to "Milwaukee Public Television, Channel 10-HD". Another switch in branding occurred in December 2016, when MPTV was rebranded to Milwaukee PBS.

On April 13, 2017, Milwaukee PBS announced it had participated in the FCC's 2016 spectrum auction and successfully sold the UHF spectrum for WMVT for just under $85 million. The WMVS spectrum was combined to serve both channels, with the only changes being the 36.4-36.6 subchannels being removed for bandwidth conservation concerns.

== Digital television ==
WMVS and WMVT share a digital signal on VHF channel 8; the stations respectively map to their respective former analog channel allocations via virtual channels 10 and 36. All of the digital subchannels mentioned below broadcast 24 hours a day, seven days a week. Until September 1, 2010, WMVS provided its main channel feed in 1080i HD, while WMVT's digital channel was used for simulcasting in 480i standard definition. However, with the complexities of the digital transition causing viewers to be unable to receive WMVS's VHF over-the-air signal – as has been a major problem in other markets – the Milwaukee PBS stations re-mapped their digital channels on September 1, 2010, in order to maximize their services, and to prepare for WMVT's 36.1 channel to eventually be transmitted in high definition in response to viewer demand. The main 10.1 signal was also reduced to 720p, as opposed to PBS's preferred 1080i format.

Most of the services also broadcast over Time Warner Cable's digital tier on that provider's southeastern Wisconsin systems, and began to be carried on Charter Communications systems on October 15, 2008 (although Charter did not purchase and absorb Time Warner Cable until 2016).

WMVS and WMVT were once unique in American television for not providing a digital simulcast of the stations' programming schedule for their analog channels, and the channels were transposed, with the multicast carried over WMVS' channel 8, and the HD signal featuring channel 10's programming (which until 2007 only featured PBS' basic HD schedule with oft-repeated programming) on channel 35, WMVT's digital allocation; this was done in order to give the stations' main signal the best possible coverage area with low interference, as WMVS-DT shared a frequency with the analog channel 8 signal of NBC affiliate WOOD-TV in Grand Rapids, Michigan. WOOD-TV's analog signal propagated easily across Lake Michigan and was sometimes receivable clearly in the lakeshore communities of Port Washington and Sheboygan. WOOD-TV likewise placed translator stations in Muskegon and Holland to avert cross-lake interference from WMVS-DT and to provide extended analog service for those communities. The issues between WOOD-TV and WMVS remained until the June 12, 2009 digital transition, when WOOD-TV shut down its analog signal on channel 8 to broadcast exclusively over digital channel 7.

The simulcasting situation was rectified on September 1, 2008, with both stations launching a simulcast of both channels' analog signals on their digital broadcast feeds ahead of the original February 17, 2009, digital switchover date and beginning broadcasts on their own signals. At that time, MPTV's PBS Kids channel, which formerly aired on 10.3, was discontinued due to PBS ceasing the PBS Kids Channel service to focus more on the cable-only PBS Kids Sprout until its sale to NBCUniversal in 2013, and WMVS' 5 a.m. – 6 p.m. weekday schedule shifted to entirely children's programming to compensate. To assuage viewers in one of the show's most popular markets, MPTV promised to continue to carry Mister Rogers' Neighborhood weekdays at noon despite PBS ending national distribution of the program on a five-day-a-week basis; this ended in late January 2010 with a sharp increase in program rights payments for the series by its distributor (the program now only airs on Sunday mornings).

Due to the bandwidth required for subchannels, and budget concerns, WMVT's main 36.1 signal remained in standard definition until February 7, 2011, when it was converted to high definition.

A secondary translator station for WMVS broadcasting on UHF channel 36 signed on the air on August 14, 2012, transmitting from the MPTV Tower to better serve the main portion of WMVS' service area with UHF-only antennas. Also planned is a boost in power of the main WMVS signal courtesy of a Public Telecommunications Facilities Program award. The channel 36 translator relayed all four multicast feeds on WMVS, and to allow differentiation between the 8 and 36 channels and reduced confusion, the virtual channel info added a "1" before the subchannel designation, thus the 36 translator aired virtual channels 10.11, 10.12, 10.13, and 10.14.

After the DTV Delay Act was passed by the U.S. Congress, MPTV, along with Milwaukee's commercial Big Four network stations and two other full-power stations, decided to convert to digital-only broadcasts on the rescheduled transition date of June 12, 2009, instead. WMVS and WMVT wound down their analog broadcasting operations at 9 a.m. on that date, prefaced with a broadcast of the station's inaugural introduction followed by the national anthem, "The Star-Spangled Banner", then a final display of the Indian Head test card and test tone before both stations signed off their analog service.

Unusually, Milwaukee PBS never introduced any second audio program channels allowing the use of services such as Descriptive Video Service on their digital channels for over a decade after launch, a rarity in the PBS system as DVS is usually expected as a regular feature (DVS and SAP were available during the analog age on both stations). This was not rectified until February 2016, when WMVS and WMVT added second and third audio program streams to all of their channels, allowing viewers to utilize DVS, along with English translation for the Spanish language program ¡Adelante!. MPTV was the last major station in the Milwaukee market to add SAP and DVS services, eight months after FCC requirements regarding audio description came into effect for the Milwaukee market for major commercial stations, though they are voluntary for non-commercial broadcasters.

In November 2016, Milwaukee Public Television switched its branding to Milwaukee PBS to better illuminate its role as the PBS member station group for Milwaukee, and in line with the launch of the PBS Passport service where a yearly donation to the station allows access to archive programming, and a new PBS Kids channel.

On August 31, 2017, Milwaukee PBS discontinued two audio channels carried by WMVT; Milwaukee PBS Classical on 36.4, which carried programming from WFMT/Chicago's "Beethoven Satellite Network", and Milwaukee PBS Jazz on 36.5, which carried programming from WFMT's "Jazz Satellite Network", due to WMVT's upcoming spectrum merger with WMVS and to save revenue from costly carriage agreements with WFMT.

Sinclair, Weigel Broadcasting, and Milwaukee PBS all decided on a switch date of January 8, 2018, for their various local spectrum moves. At that time, both WMVS and WMVT remapped their channels on physical channel 8, with WMVT retaining their main signal on 36.1 in HD, with World moving to 36.2 and MPTV's weather service mapping to 36.3. WMVS then mapped to their main service on 10.1 in HD, with Create on 10.2 and PBS Kids remaining on 10.3. Despite the channel share, the inner-core channel 36 translator mapped to channels 10.11-10.13 did not repeat WMVT's channels, and only repeated those of WMVS.

The translator service was ended in mid-June 2020 as another after-effect of the spectrum auction where it was required to end service, as 36 is the last channel in the new UHF bandplan (though WMKE-CD would take it over as their physical channel shortly after).

=== Subchannels ===
Milwaukee PBS multiplex
License	Subchannel	Res.	Short name	Programming service	Description of subchannel
WMVS	10.1	720p	WMVS HD	Milwaukee PBS 10	Channel 10's main programming schedule; it also carries PBS' default satellite schedule during the overnight hours.
WMVS	10.2	480i	Create	Create (Note: Create formerly aired overnights on WMVT after 1 a.m. or 3 a.m. until 6 a.m., depending on if the Wisconsin Educational Communications Board was broadcasting instructional programming via Wisconsin Public Television. With the WECB moving to online-only broadcasting with the 2014–15 academic term, repeats of documentaries and British series now air overnights.)	Home and garden instructional television programming; it features no local programming.
WMVS	10.3	480i	Kids	PBS Kids	Children's programming; replaced the Spanish-language network V-Me on January 9, 2017, during a soft-launch leading to its official January 16 launch.
WMVT	36.1	720p	WMVT HD	Milwaukee PBS 36	Channel 36's main programming schedule.
WMVT	36.2	480i	WORLD	World Channel	Features PBS' news and public affairs programming, along with government hearings, presidential speeches and some local government programming.
WMVT	36.3	480i	Weather	Weather & Traffic (Note: Until September 2010, this channel featured weather conditions imagery from the National Weather Service and Doppler weather radar from the NWS forecast office in Sullivan, Wisconsin (mainly video stills and looping GIF images), from satellite imagery. In early February 2018, the Milwaukee area Wisconsin Department of Transportation traffic camera footage that formerly appeared alone as "MPTV Traffic" 36.6 when WMVT was on its own spectrum returned as part of the channel's program loop.)	Looping weather forecast maps and temperature data without any meteorologist-presented forecasting, and audio from local NOAA Weather Radio station KEC60. (Note: KEC60 was used as the second audio program feed on WMVS' analog channel during programming without DVS or alternate language tracks.) The channel is programmed by AccuWeather, separate from the "Local AccuWeather Channel" it formerly provided to commercial stations.

== Instructional division ==
Milwaukee PBS, as part of the Milwaukee Area Technical College, also provides the student television station facility and production support for the Television and Video Production Division at MATC. TVP, formerly known as 'Telecasting', predates the stations and has produced several hundred broadcast video professionals over the years.

The two-year program is unique in Wisconsin's technical college system, as well as nationwide. Stations licensed directly to a college are fairly rare in the PBS system, especially in larger markets, and even fewer are attached to a technical/two-year college. As a result, students in the division enroll from all over the state. The student population also tends to include out-of-state students as well as international students. As such, one of the major goals of a TVP student during their time at MATC/MPBS is to produce a program of educational television or entertaining interest to air during the organization's Student Operations Day, which occurs on a Saturday in late April or early May, where student programs air on WMVT throughout the broadcast day. WMVT also televises MATC graduation ceremonies.

== See also ==
- The Making of Milwaukee
