= KLOB =

Radio station in Thousand Palms, California

- Thousand Palms, California; United States
- Broadcast area: Palm Springs, California
- Frequency: 94.7 MHz
- Branding: La Suavecita 94.7

Programming
- Language: Spanish
- Format: Soft AC

Ownership
- Owner: Entravision Communications; (Entravision Holdings, LLC)

History
- First air date: November 21, 1994
- Former call signs: KVTZ (CP, 1992-1994)
- Call sign meaning: Radio Lobo (original branding)

Technical information
- Licensing authority: FCC
- Facility ID: 40518
- Class: A
- ERP: 1,350 watts
- HAAT: 195 meters (640 ft)
- Transmitter coordinates: 33°51′56″N 116°25′58″W

Links
- Public license information: Public file; LMS
- Webcast: Listen live (via iHeartRadio)
- Website: elboton.com/palm-springs/radiolasuavecita

KLOB (94.7 FM, "La Suavecita") is a Spanish language Soft AC radio station licensed to Thousand Palms, California, United States, and serving the Palm Springs area. The station is currently owned by Entravision Communications. Its studios are in Palm Desert, while the transmitter is near North Palm Springs.

== History ==
The station was issued a construction permit on June 23, 1992, with an expiration on December 23, 1993, later extended into 1994. The station was assigned the KVYZ call letters on August 21, 1992, only to change to their current KLOB on January 31, 1994.

KLOB formally signed on with a Regional Mexican format as "Radio Lobo 94.7 on November 21, 1994, with 730 watts of power. It has always presented its programs in Spanish.

On May 19, 1995, KLOB increased its power to 1.8 kilowatts, after minor modifications were approved.

After the station was purchased by EXCL Communications, it flipped to a Romantic format as Radio Romántica 94.7. In 1999. Just prior to this, KLOB decreased its power to 1650 watts. In 2000, EXCL was acquired by Entravision, which began to phase out the Romántica brand in 2003. KLOB flipped to a rock en español format branded as "94.7 Super Estrella" in 2004, only to later evolve into a Hurban/Latin pop direction.

On January 6, 2009, KLOB flipped to an adult hits format, branded as "Jose 94.7". By 2012 KLOB had evolved into a Latin jazz station.

During this time, KLOB featured radio personality Eddie "Piolín" Sotelo on his weekday morning program "el Piolín por la Manana" through his home station KSCA 101.9 FM in Los Angeles. It is the #1 rated radio program (in any language) for the Coachella Valley as well in the Los Angeles Area radio markets.

On January 8, 2018, KLOB flipped to its current format, branded as "La Suavecita 94.7", on the same day as its fellow distant sister stations KSEH in Brawley, KSES in Seaside and KTSE-FM in Patterson. La Suavecita translates as "The little soft one" as its music is workplace-grade and downtempo compared to other latin pop stations.

On April 28, 2020, KLOB changed its transmitter power output for the first time since 1999, decreasing by 350 watts.
