= Channel 43 =

Channel 43 refers to several television stations:

- RCTI, Indonesia on Channel 43 UHF for Jakarta territories.
- THCT43 (THTPCT), Vietnam on Channel 43 UHF for Can Tho province.
- QRT, Vietnam on Channel 43 UHF for Dien Ban, Quang Nam

== Canada ==
The following television stations formerly broadcast on digital or analog channel 43 (UHF frequencies covering 645.25-649.75 MHz) in Canada:

- CBUT-DT in Vancouver, British Columbia
- CHOB-TV in Maskwacis, Alberta
- CHRO-DT-43 in Ottawa, Ontario

The following television stations operate on virtual channel 43 in Canada:

- CHRO-DT-43 in Ottawa, Ontario

== See also ==
- Channel 43 TV stations in Mexico
- Channel 43 digital TV stations in the United States
- Channel 43 virtual TV stations in the United States
- Channel 43 low-power TV stations in the United States
