= Kaap =

Kaap or KAAP may refer to:

- Andrau Airpark (ICAO code KAAP)
- Cape of Good Hope, a rocky headland on the Atlantic coast of the Cape Peninsula in South Africa, known in Afrikaans as Kaap die Goeie Hoop
- KAAP-LD, a low-power television station (channel 24, virtual 24) licensed to serve Santa Cruz, California, United States
- KAAP-LP, a defunct low-power television station (channel 2) formerly licensed to serve Santa Cruz, California
- KAPL-FM, a radio station (99.5 FM) licensed to serve Rock Island, Washington, United States, which held the call sign KAAP from 2000 to 2016
