= List of Antenna TV affiliates =

The following is a listing of affiliates for Antenna TV, a classic television network, which was launched on January 1, 2011, by Tribune Broadcasting and is now owned by Nexstar Media Group.

Affiliates are listed in order by state and city of license.

List of Antenna TV affiliates
City of license / market	Station	Channel	Primary affiliation	Owner
Birmingham, AL	WTTO	21.2	Independent	Sinclair Broadcast Group
Dothan, AL	WDHN	18.4	ABC	Nexstar Media Group
Huntsville–Decatur–Florence, AL	WHNT-TV	19.3	CBS	Nexstar Media Group
Mobile, AL	WKRG-TV	5.3	CBS	Nexstar Media Group
Montgomery, AL	WCOV-TV	20.2	Fox	Gray Media
Anchorage, AK	KAUU	5.2	CBS	Gray Media
Phoenix, AZ	KNXV-TV	15.2	ABC	E. W. Scripps Company
Tucson, AZ	KGUN-TV	9.3	ABC	E. W. Scripps Company
Fort Smith–Fayetteville, AR	KFSM-TV	5.3	CBS	Tegna Inc.
Little Rock, AR	KARK-TV	4.4	NBC	Nexstar Media Group
Bakersfield, CA	KKEY-LD	13.2	Telemundo	Nexstar Media Group
Cathedral City–Palm Springs, CA	KRET-CD	45.4	Binge TV	Bridge Media Networks
Chico, CA	KXVU-LD	17.1	—N/a	Sinclair Broadcast Group
Fresno–Visalia–Merced, CA	KGPE	47.3	CBS	Nexstar Media Group
Los Angeles, CA	KTLA	5.2	The CW	Nexstar Media Group
Sacramento–Stockton–Modesto, CA	KTXL	40.2	Fox	Nexstar Media Group
San Diego, CA	KSWB-TV	69.2	Fox	Nexstar Media Group
San Francisco–Oakland–San Jose, CA	KRON-TV	4.2	The CW	Nexstar Media Group
San Francisco–Oakland–San Jose, CA	KAAP-LD	24.3	Diya TV	Major Market Broadcasting
Colorado Springs–Pueblo, CO	KXRM-TV	21.4	Fox	Nexstar Media Group
Denver, CO	KDVR	31.2	Fox	Nexstar Media Group
Fort Collins, CO	KFCT (Note: Satellite of KDVR.)	22.2	Fox	Nexstar Media Group
Grand Junction, CO	KLML	21.13	Court TV	Ventura Broadcasting
Hartford–New Haven, CT	WTIC-TV	61.2	Fox	Tegna Inc.
Washington, D.C.	WDCW	50.2	The CW	Nexstar Media Group
Fort Myers–Naples–Cape Coral, FL	WINK-TV	11.2	CBS	Fort Myers Broadcasting Company
Gainesville, FL	WYME-CD	45.1	—N/a	Sinclair Broadcast Group
Jacksonville, FL	WTLV	12.2	NBC	Tegna Inc.
Miami, FL	WSFL-TV	39.3	Independent	E. W. Scripps Company
Orlando, FL	WSWF-LD	10.6	Diya TV	Major Market Broadcasting
Palm Beach–West Palm Beach, FL	WTCN-CD	43.2	MyNetworkTV	Sinclair Broadcast Group
Panama City, FL	WMBB	13.2	ABC	Nexstar Media Group
Tallahassee, FL	WTLF	24.5	The CW Plus	Sinclair Broadcast Group
Tampa–St. Petersburg, FL	WFLA-TV	8.3	NBC	Nexstar Media Group
Atlanta, GA	WATL	36.3	MyNetworkTV	Tegna Inc.
Augusta, GA	WJBF	6.3	ABC	Nexstar Media Group
Columbus, GA	WLTZ	38.3	NBC	Gray Media
Dalton, GA	WDNN-CD	43.4	Heartland	Gray Media
Savannah, GA	WTGS	28.3	Fox	Sinclair Broadcast Group
Honolulu, HI	KHNL	13.3	NBC	Gray Media
Boise, ID	KTVB	7.8	NBC	Tegna Inc.
Pocatello–Idaho Falls, ID	KVUI	31.11	Ion Television	Ventura Broadcasting
Twin Falls, ID	KBAX-LD	27.6	MeTV	Karlo Maalouf
Champaign, IL	WRSP-TV	55.3	Fox	Sinclair Broadcast Group
Chicago, IL	WGN-TV	9.2	The CW	Nexstar Media Group
Moline, IL	WQAD-TV	8.2	ABC	Tegna Inc.
Rockford, IL	WIFR-LD	23.2	CBS	Gray Media
Evansville, IN	WTSN-CD	20.2	H&I	Three Sisters Broadcasting, LLC
Fort Wayne, IN	WFFT-TV	55.3	Fox	Gray Media
Indianapolis, IN	WXIN	59.2	Fox	Nexstar Media Group
South Bend, IN	WNDU-TV	16.3	NBC	Gray Media
Terre Haute, IN	WTWO	2.4	NBC	Nexstar Media Group
Des Moines, IA	WHO-DT	13.3	NBC	Nexstar Media Group
Mason City, IA–Albert Lea–Rochester–Austin, MN	KIMT	3.4	CBS	Allen Media Group
Topeka, KS	KTKA-TV	49.4	ABC	Vaughan Media (Note: Operated by Nexstar Media Group.)
Lexington, KY	WLJC-TV	65.3	Cozi TV	Margaret Drake
Bowling Green, KY	WDNZ-LD	11.1/11.4	MyNetworkTV	Marquee Broadcasting
Louisville, KY–Salem, IN	WBKI	58.3	The CW	Gray Media
Paducah, KY	WPSD-TV	6.3	NBC	Paxton Media Group
Baton Rouge, LA	WVLA-TV	33.4	NBC	White Knight Broadcasting
Lafayette, LA	KXKW-LD	32.2	The Action Channel	Delta Media Corporation
Monroe, LA	KARD-TV	14.4	Fox	Nexstar Media Group
New Orleans, LA	WGNO	26.2	ABC	Nexstar Media Group
Shreveport–Minden, LA–Texarkana, TX	KPXJ	21.4	The CW	KTBS, LLC.
Waterville-Portland, ME	WPFO	23.4	Fox	Cunningham Broadcasting (Note: Operated by Sinclair Broadcast Group.)
Baltimore, MD	WNUV	54.2	The CW	Sinclair Broadcast Group
Cambridge, MD	WBOC-LD	16.3	Telemundo	Draper Holdings Business Trust
Salisbury, MD	WRDE-LD	16.3, 16.4, 16.5, 16.6	NBC	Draper Holdings Business Trust
Salisbury, MD	WSJZ-LD	16.4	Telemundo	Draper Holdings Business Trust
Boston, MA	WCRN-LD	13.5	France 24	5GTV, LLC
Detroit, MI	WMYD	20.2	Independent	E. W. Scripps Company
Flint–Saginaw–Bay City–Midland, MI	WBSF	46.3	The CW	Cunningham Broadcasting
Grand Rapids–Kalamazoo–Battle Creek, MI	WOOD-TV	8.2	NBC	Nexstar Media Group
Duluth, MN–Superior, WI	KQDS-TV	21.2	Fox	Coastal Television Broadcasting Company
Minneapolis–Saint Paul, MN	WUCW	23.6	The CW	Sinclair Broadcast Group
Biloxi, MS	WXVO-LD	7.1	—N/a	Ocean7, LLC
Cleveland, MS	WHCQ-LD	8.1	—N/a	Ellington Broadcasting
Hattiesburg–Laurel, MS	WHPM-LD	3.3	Fox	Gray Media
Jackson, MS	WDBD	40.2	Fox	Gray Media
Tupelo-Columbus-West Point, MS	WTVA	9.5	NBC/ABC	Gray Media
Joplin, MO–Pittsburg, KS	KSNF	16.4	NBC	Nexstar Media Group
Kansas City, MO	WDAF-TV	4.2	Fox	Nexstar Media Group
St. Joseph, MO	KQTV	2.2	ABC	Heartland Media
St. Louis, MO	KTVI	2.2	Fox	Nexstar Media Group
Springfield–Osage Beach, MO	KRBK	49.2	Fox	Nexstar Media Group
Billings, MT	KSVI	6.4	ABC	Nexstar Media Group
Missoula, MT	KMJD-LD	34.1	—N/a	Valley Broadcast Network, LLC
Las Vegas, NV	KLAS-TV	8.2	CBS	Nexstar Media Group
Reno, NV	KRNV-DT	4.3	Roar	Cunningham Broadcasting
Albuquerque–Santa Fe, NM	KASY-TV	50.5	MyNetworkTV	Mission Broadcasting
Albany–Schenectady–Troy, NY	WTEN	10.3	ABC	Nexstar Media Group
Buffalo, NY	WGRZ	2.2	NBC	Tegna Inc.
Elmira–Corning, NY	WETM-TV	18.3	NBC	Nexstar Media Group
New York, NY	WPIX	11.2	The CW	Mission Broadcasting
Rochester, NY	WUHF	31.2	Fox	Sinclair Broadcast Group
Syracuse, NY	WSYR-TV	9.2	ABC	Nexstar Media Group
Utica, NY	WVVC-LD	40.1	—N/a	Northeast Gospel Broadcasting, Inc.
Watertown, NY	WVNC-LD	45.2	NBC	SagamoreHill Broadcasting
Belmont–Charlotte, NC	WJZY	46.7	Fox	Nexstar Media Group
High Point–Greensboro–Winston-Salem, NC	WGHP	8.2	Fox	Nexstar Media Group
Jacksonville, NC	WTMQ-LD	41.1	—N/a	Tutt Media Group
Kinston, NC	WTMH-LD	21.2	Heartland	Tutt Media Group
Ogden–Wilmington, NC	WTMV-LD	21.2	Independent	Tutt Media Group
Raleigh–Durham–Fayetteville, NC	WNCN	17.4	CBS	Nexstar Media Group
Smithfield, NC	WARZ-LD	21.2	Heartland	Tutt Media Group
Bismarck, ND	KXMB-TV	12.2	The CW	Nexstar Media Group
Grand Forks, ND	KBRR	10.2	Fox	Coastal Television Broadcasting Company
Jamestown, ND	KJRR	7.2	Fox	Coastal Television Broadcasting Company
Minot, ND	KXMC-TV	13.2	The CW	Nexstar Media Group
Pembina, ND	KNRR	12.2	Fox	Coastal Television Broadcasting Company
Fargo, ND	KVRR	15.2	Fox	Coastal Television Broadcasting Company
Cincinnati, OH	WSTR-TV	64.2	MyNetworkTV	Sinclair Broadcast Group
Cleveland, OH	WJW	8.2	Fox	Nexstar Media Group
Columbus, OH	WTTE	28.2	Roar	Cunningham Broadcasting
Dayton, OH	WRGT-TV	45.3	Antenna TV	Sinclair Broadcast Group
Toledo, OH	WMNT-CD	48.2	MyNetworkTV	Community Broadcast Group, Inc.
Youngstown, OH	WYFX-LD	62.6	Fox	Nexstar Media Group
Oklahoma City, OK	KFOR-TV	4.2	NBC	Nexstar Media Group
Tulsa, OK	KTUL	8.3	ABC	Sinclair Broadcast Group
Eugene, OR	KCES-LD	18.2	Better Life TV	Channel 18, LLC
Klamath Falls, OR	KDKF (Note: Semi-satellite of KDRV.)	31.2	ABC	Allen Media Group
Medford, OR	KDRV	12.2	ABC	Allen Media Group
Salem–Portland, OR–Vancouver, WA	KRCW-TV	32.2	The CW	Nexstar Media Group
Erie, PA	WFXP	66.4	Fox	Mission Broadcasting
Harrisburg–Lancaster–York–Lebanon, PA	WPMT	43.2	Fox	Tegna Inc.
Philadelphia, PA	WPHL-TV	17.2	The CW	Nexstar Media Group
Pittsburgh, PA	WPGH-TV	53.2	Fox	Sinclair Broadcast Group
Scranton–Wilkes-Barre, PA	WNEP-TV	16.2	ABC	Tegna Inc.
Providence, RI–New Bedford, MA	WVMA-CD	17.1	—N/a	Woodland Communications, LLC
Providence, RI–New Bedford, MA	WNAC-TV	64.4	Fox	Mission Broadcasting
Charleston, SC	WGWG	4.3	MeTV	Howard Stirk Holdings
Columbia, SC	WLTX	19.7	CBS	Tegna Inc.
Florence–Myrtle Beach, SC–Lumberton, NC	WBTW	13.2	CBS	Nexstar Media Group
Greenville–Spartanburg–Anderson, SC–Asheville, NC	WLOS	13.3	ABC	Sinclair Broadcast Group
Hardeeville, SC–Savannah, GA	WTGS	28.3	Fox	Sinclair Broadcast Group
Johnson City–Kingsport–Bristol, TN–Bristol, VA	WJHL-TV	11.3	CBS/ABC	Nexstar Media Group
Knoxville, TN	WATE-TV	6.2	ABC	Nexstar Media Group
Memphis, TN	WREG-TV	3.3	CBS	Nexstar Media Group
Nashville, TN	WZTV	17.3	Fox	Sinclair Broadcasting Group
Amarillo, TX	KAMR-TV	4.4	NBC	Nexstar Media Group
Austin–Llano, TX	KBVO	14.3	MyNetworkTV	Nexstar Media Group
Dallas–Fort Worth, TX	KDAF	33.2	The CW	Nexstar Media Group
El Paso, TX–Las Cruces, NM	KDBC-TV	4.3	CBS	Sinclair Broadcasting Group
Harlingen–McAllen–Brownsville, TX	KGBT-TV	4.4	The CW	Nexstar Media Group
Houston, TX	KIAH	39.2	The CW	Nexstar Media Group
Lubbock, TX	KLBK-TV	13.3	CBS	Nexstar Media Group
Odessa–Midland, TX	KPEJ-TV	24.4	Fox	Mission Broadcasting Inc.
San Angelo, TX	KLST	8.4	CBS	Nexstar Media Group
San Antonio, TX	WOAI-TV	4.3	NBC	Sinclair Broadcast Group
Tyler–Jacksonville–Longview, TX	KIVY-LD	16.1	—N/a	Leon Hunt
Tyler–Jacksonville–Longview, TX	KETK-TV	56.4	NBC	Nexstar Media Group
Victoria, TX	KXTS-LD	41.2	CBS	Morgan Murphy Media
Waco–Killeen–Temple, TX	KWKT-TV	44.3	Fox	Nexstar Media Group
Wichita Falls, TX–Lawton, OK	KFDX-TV	3.4	NBC	Nexstar Media Group
Salt Lake City, UT	KTVX	4.2	ABC	Nexstar Media Group
Burlington, VT–Plattsburgh, NY	WFFF-TV	44.4	Fox	Nexstar Media Group
Portsmouth–Norfolk, VA	WVBT	43.3	Fox	Nexstar Media Group
Richmond–Petersburg, VA	WRIC-TV	8.2	ABC	Nexstar Media Group
Roanoke–Lynchburg, VA	WFXR	27.4	Fox	Nexstar Media Group
Seattle–Tacoma, WA	KZJO	22.3	MyNetworkTV	Fox Television Stations
Spokane, WA	KAYU-TV	28.2	Fox	Rincon Broadcasting Group
Chippewa Falls–Eau Claire, WI	WEUX (Note: Satellite of WLAX.)	48.2	Fox	Nexstar Media Group
Green Bay–Fox Cities, WI	WLUK-TV	11.2	Fox	Sinclair Broadcast Group
La Crosse, WI	WLAX	25.2	Fox	Nexstar Media Group
Madison, WI	WMSN-TV	47.6	Fox	Sinclair Broadcast Group
Milwaukee, WI	WITI	6.2	Fox	Fox Television Stations
Rhinelander–Wausau, WI	WJFW-TV	12.3	NBC	Rockfleet Broadcasting
Charleston–Huntington, WV	WCHS-TV	8.3	ABC	Sinclair Broadcast Group
Clarksburg, WV	WUSV-LD	16.1	—N/a	Steven J. Tocco
