= List of United States over-the-air television networks =

Throughout most of the history of television broadcasting in the United States, there were only three or four major commercial national networks that transmitted over-the-air. This group of channels, termed the "Big Three"_{,} comprises ABC, CBS, and NBC. Fox has been proposed as a fourth network; public broadcaster PBS is a non-commercial educational network. The Big Three have continued to dominate the free-to-air market after the advent of digital broadcasting.

== History ==
From 1946 to 1956, major television networks were ABC, CBS, NBC and DuMont. From 1956 to 1986, the "Big Three" national commercial networks were ABC, CBS, and NBC. There were various attempts at establishing a fourth network, such as National Telefilm Associates's NTA Film Network, the Overmyer Network, and DuMont shareholder Paramount Pictures's Paramount Television Network. From 1954 to 1970, National Educational Television was the national clearinghouse for public TV programming; the Public Broadcasting Service (PBS) succeeded it in 1970.

The transition to digital broadcasting in 2009 has allowed for television stations to offer additional programming options through digital subchannels (multicasting), one or more supplementary programming streams to the station's primary channel that are achieved through multiplexing of a station's signal. A number of new commercial networks airing specialty programming such as movies, reruns of classic series and lifestyle programs have been created from companies like Weigel Broadcasting, Sinclair Broadcast Group and even owners of the major networks such as Fox Corporation (through the Fox Entertainment subsidiary), Skydance (through the CBS Media Ventures subsidiary), The Walt Disney Company (through the Walt Disney Television subsidiary) and Comcast (through the NBCUniversal subsidiary). Through the use of multicasting, there have also been a number of new Spanish-language and non-commercial public TV networks that have launched.

== Overview ==
Free-to-air networks in the U.S. can be divided into five categories:

- Commercial networks – which air English-language programming to a general audience (for example, ABC, CBS, NBC, and Fox);
- Spanish-language networks – fully programmed networks which air Spanish-language programming to a primarily Latin American audience (for example, Telemundo and Univision);
- Educational and other non-commercial broadcast networks – which air English- and some foreign-language television programming, intended to be educational in nature or otherwise of a sort not found on commercial television (for example, PBS);
- Religious broadcast networks – which air religious study and other faith-based programs, and in some cases, family-oriented secular programs (for example, Daystar, Hope Channel, 3ABN and TBN).
- Shopping networks – which air live presentations of various products intended to be sold directly to the viewer (for example, HSN and QVC).

Each network transmits its signal to numerous local affiliate television stations across the country. These affiliates broadcast the network feed, allowing programs to reach up to tens of millions of households nationwide. For the largest networks, the signal is distributed to more than 200 stations, while for the smallest networks it may be sent to only a dozen or fewer.

=== Major networks ===
NBC

CBS

ABC

PBS

Fox

The four major commercial English-language broadcast television networks with the non-commercial network PBS

Univision

Telemundo

Estrella TV

The three major commercial Spanish-language broadcast television networks

More than 50 national free-to-air networks exist. Other than the non-commercial educational network PBS, which is composed of member stations, the largest terrestrial television networks are the traditional Big Three (ABC, CBS and NBC). Many other large networks exist, however, notably Fox and The CW, which air original programming for two hours each night instead of three like the original "Big Three" do, as well as MyNetworkTV, which features reruns of recent popular shows with little to no original programming, and Ion Television, which has had the same format since around 2007 but has started to pursue sports properties. Fox has just about the same household reach percentage as the Big Three, and is therefore often considered a peer to ABC, CBS, and NBC since it has also achieved equal or better ratings since the late 1990s; as of 2019, it also programs the equivalent amount of sports programming as the Big Three. Most media outlets now include Fox in what they refer to as the "Big Four" TV networks.

==== Commercial ====
- NBC
- CBS
- ABC
- Fox

==== Non-commercial ====
- PBS

==== Spanish commercial ====
- Univision
- Telemundo
- Estrella TV

== List of networks ==
All of the networks listed below operate a number of terrestrial TV stations. In addition, several of these networks are also aired on pay television services.

=== English language ===
Genre/type	Name	Owner	Subsidiary	Launch date	% of U.S. households reached	# of households viewable	# of full-power affiliates	# of low-power/class-A affiliates	Description	Notes
Commercial	NBC	Comcast	NBCUniversal	1939 (Note: Although CBS and NBC were founded in 1926 and 1927, respectively and ABC was founded in 1943, those companies did not begin continuous over the air TV broadcasting until 1939 (NBC), 1941 (CBS) and 1948 (ABC).)	97%	114,848,000	226	~338	Major commercial network	
Commercial	CBS	Skydance	CBS Entertainment Group	1941	97%	114,848,000	215	~299	Major commercial network	
Commercial	ABC	The Walt Disney Company	Walt Disney Television	1948	97%	114,848,000	229	~266	Major commercial network	
Commercial	Fox	Fox Corporation		1986 (Note: DuMont's relationship with the Fox network via Metromedia is disputed, with Fox being either a modern re-incarnation, or at least a linear descendant of the DuMont Television Network (via former DuMont subsidiary Metromedia) according to radio personality Clarke Ingram.)	97%	114,848,000	223	~202	Major commercial network	
Commercial	MyNetworkTV	Fox Corporation		2006 (Note: On January 24, 2006, CBS and Time Warner announced the merger of The WB and UPN, forming one larger network, the CW in late 2006. See the CW for more information. The CW and MyNetworkTV are also carried on cable-only channels and digital subchannels of many currently operating television stations of several different affiliations, ranging from current CBS and Fox affiliates, to even NBC and ABC affiliates. The WB and UPN shut down on September 18, 2006 to merge into the CW. MyNetworkTV was created by the Fox Broadcasting Company to give programming to several Fox-owned UPN affiliates when it launched on September 4, 2006. MyNetworkTV transitioned from a commercial network to a syndication service in 2009.)	88%	117,149,127	151	~30	Commercial/syndication service	
Commercial	The CW	Nexstar Media Group (81.1%), Skydance (18.9%)		2006	82%	108,569,170	106	~5	Mid-major commercial network	
Commercial	The CW Plus	Nexstar Media Group (81.1%), Skydance (18.9%)		2006	23%	32,755,513	119	~25	Commercial/syndication service	
Non-commercial educational	PBS	PBS's member public television stations		1969 (Note: Although PBS was initially established in 1969, it assumed full-time broadcasts on October 5, 1970 to replace its predecessor, National Educational Television (NET).)	96%	113,664,000	349	~342	News, documentaries, how-to/lifestyle, children's and imported entertainment programs	
Non-commercial educational	PBS Kids	PBS		2017 (Note: Although the PBS Kids block was created in 1994, the current incarnation of the 24-hour PBS Kids channel was not created until January 16, 2017.)	83%	98,272,000	269	0	Children's programming	Digital multicast service
Non-commercial educational	Create	American Public Television / WNET / WGBH Educational Foundation		2006	86%	87,616,000	238	1	How-to, DIY and other lifestyle-oriented instructional programs	Digital multicast service
Non-commercial educational	World Channel	American Public Television / WNET / WGBH Educational Foundation and National Educational Telecommunications Association		2007	59%	68,617,000	160	0	International news and documentaries	Digital multicast service
Non-commercial educational	Classic Arts Showcase	The Lloyd E. Rigler – Lawrence E. Deutsch Foundation		1994	33%	6,978,000	3	3	Non-commercial performance art video clips	
Non-commercial educational	DW-TV	Deutsche Welle		1953	2%	2,326,000	5	1	Multicultural programming	
Non-commercial educational	First Nations Experience	San Bernardino Community College District		2011	12%	14,208,000	22	7	Native American programming	
Non-commercial educational	France 24	France Médias Monde		2006	10%	11,640,000	4		International news	
Non-commercial educational	Minnesota Channel	Twin Cities Public Television, Inc.		2005	2%	2,326,000	17	0	Educational, public affairs, ethnic and local programming	Digital multicast service available mainly on Minnesota PBS stations
Non-commercial educational	JBC World-Japan	JBC		1998	18%	20,934,000	15	0	Japanese news and information	
Specialty/entertainment networks	MeTV	Weigel Broadcasting		2010	84%	99,456,000	176	29	Classic series	
Specialty/entertainment networks	MeTV+	Weigel Broadcasting		2021	31.59%	98,715,606	38		Classic series	
Specialty/entertainment networks	MeTV Toons	Weigel Broadcasting		2024	74.77%	233,645,469	189		Classic cartoons and animated series	
Specialty/entertainment networks	Story Television	Weigel Broadcasting		2022	71.02%	221,932,196	171		Classic historic and documentary series	
Specialty/entertainment networks	Catchy Comedy	Weigel Broadcasting		2015	57%	67,488,000	53	6	Classic sitcoms	
Specialty/entertainment networks	Heroes & Icons	Weigel Broadcasting		2014	58%	68,672,000	57	30	Classic action and sci-fi series; men's interest	
Specialty/entertainment networks	WEST	Weigel Broadcasting		2025	44%	137,571,500	23	22	Classic western series	
Specialty/entertainment networks	Antenna TV	Nexstar Media Group		2011	80%	94,720,000	114	27	Classic series	
Specialty/entertainment networks	Rewind TV	Nexstar Media Group		2021	59.99%	187,436,338	278		Classic series	
Specialty/entertainment networks	Dabl	Skydance (managed by Weigel Broadcasting)		2019	77.70%	91,996,800			Reruns of Black-centric sitcoms	
Specialty/entertainment networks	Start TV	CBS Television Stations / Weigel Broadcasting (both owning 50%)		2018	46%	54,464,000	25	6	Female-protagonist procedural dramas	
Specialty/entertainment networks	Movies!	Fox Television Stations / Weigel Broadcasting (both owning 50%)		2013	57%	67,488,000	52	18	Feature films	
Specialty/entertainment networks	MovieSphere Gold	Lionsgate Worldwide Television Distribution Group / Debmar-Mercury	Lionsgate Sudios	2025	68.71%	214,685,841	40	121	Premium films	
Specialty/entertainment networks	True Crime Network	Tegna Inc.		2014	76%	92,936,000	62	10	True Crime/Investigation	Launched as Justice Network
Specialty/entertainment networks	Quest	Tegna Inc.		2018	65%	78,200,000	29	TBD	Adventure programming	
Specialty/entertainment networks	Bounce TV	E. W. Scripps Company	Scripps Networks	2011	73%	86,432,000	112	11	Black-centered programming	
Specialty/entertainment networks	Court TV	E. W. Scripps Company	Scripps Networks	2019	80.49%	95,300,160	414		True crime/court news	
Specialty/entertainment networks	Grit	E. W. Scripps Company	Scripps Networks	2014	75%	88,800,000	120	16	Action; westerns; men's interest	
Specialty/entertainment networks	Ion Mystery	E. W. Scripps Company	Scripps Networks	2014	75%	88,800,000	124	25	Suspense; drama; women's interest	Launched as Escape, later rebranded as Court TV Mystery
Specialty/entertainment networks	Ion Television	E. W. Scripps Company	Scripps Networks	1998 (as Pax TV)	72% (OTA only)	85,248,000	109	25	Procedural dramas and professional women's sports	
Specialty/entertainment networks	Laff	E. W. Scripps Company	Scripps Networks	2015	74%		111	22	Comedy series and movies	
Specialty/entertainment networks	Comet	Sinclair Television Group	Sinclair Broadcast Group	2015	66%	78,144,000	100	17	Science fiction	
Specialty/entertainment networks	Charge!	Sinclair Television Group	Sinclair Broadcast Group	2017	43%	50,912,000	52	4	Action series and films	
Specialty/entertainment networks	Roar	Sinclair Television Group	Sinclair Broadcast Group	2017	25%	29,600,000	50	5	Comedy programming	Launched as TBD
Specialty/entertainment networks	The Nest	Sinclair Television Group	Sinclair Broadcast Group	2023	78.89%	103,550,378	88	8	Variety of reality, true crime, and celebrity TV	
Specialty/entertainment networks	Great	Sony Corporation of America	Sony Pictures Television	2014	66%	256,556,374	66	20	Classic television series	
Specialty/entertainment networks	Cozi TV	Comcast	NBC Owned Television Stations	2013	56%	66,304,000	66	31	Classic television series	
Specialty/entertainment networks	NBC True CRMZ	Comcast	NBC Owned Television Stations	2024	68.24%	213,238,719	126		True crime documentaries	Replaced NBC LX Home, which converted into a FAST streaming channel, on OTA stations
Specialty/entertainment networks	Oxygen	Versant		2000	71.69%	223,996,934	170		True crime documentaries	Also distributed as a cable/satellite network
Specialty/entertainment networks	Buzzr	Fremantle / RTL Group		2015	45%	53,280,000	20	37	Game shows	
Specialty/entertainment networks	Game Show Central	Sony Corporation of America	Sony Pictures Television	2025 (Note: Game Show Central originated as a FAST streaming channel in 2020; a separate over-the-air broadcast feed featuring archived Game Show Network original programs not available on the streaming channel was launched in February 2025.)	64%	200,465,017	107		Game shows	
Specialty/entertainment networks	Defy	Free TV Networks		2021 (Note: Defy TV was originally launched in 2021 by The E. W. Scripps Company. In July 2024, Free TV Networks, after acquiring the branding and programming rights from Scripps, relaunched Defy over the channel space of the planned Dare reality network; Ion Plus (which had earlier converted from OTA multicast to FAST streaming distribution following Scripps's 2021 purchase of Ion Media) concurrently took over the original Defy's channel space.)	75.49%	235,877,219	319		Reality television	
Specialty/entertainment networks	Outlaw	Free TV Networks		2024	80.41%	251,258,542	500		Western-centric programming	
Specialty/entertainment networks	365BLK	Free TV Networks		2024	80.26%	250,802,489	301		Black-centric entertainment programming	
Specialty/entertainment networks	Busted	Free TV Networks		2025	80.23%	250,695,750	257		Police-centric reality programming	
Specialty/entertainment networks	Localish	The Walt Disney Company	ABC Owned Television Stations	2009	25%	29,600,000	8	0	Health/lifestyle	
Specialty/entertainment networks	Nosey	Nosey Baxter, LLC		2018	58.19%	181,839,410	148		Talk and court show reruns	
Specialty/entertainment networks	Confess by Nosey	Nosey Baxter, LLC		2021	45.02%	140,671,494	67		Court show reruns	
Specialty/entertainment networks	Law & Crime Network	LawNewz, LLC		2018	30.66%	95,791,509	59		Trial coverage and true crime programs	
Specialty/entertainment networks	Retro TV	Get After It Media	Henry Luken III	2005	39%	123,294,365	3	105	Commercial, reruns	
Specialty/entertainment networks	The Family Channel	Get After It Media	Henry Luken III	2008	24.42%	76,320,846	1	65	General entertainment	
Specialty/entertainment networks	Rev'n Action	Get After It Media	Henry Luken III	2014	23.06%	72,062,300	0	62	Automotive	
Specialty/entertainment networks	Hasbro Legends	Get After It Media	Henry Luken III	2026	49.76%	155,500,238	0	80	Classic live-action/animated series	
Specialty/entertainment networks	Ace TV	Aspen Hill Media Group		2019					Classic and imported dramas, and unscripted programming	
Specialty/entertainment networks	NOST	Classic Broadcasting, LLC		2020					Classic television series, and paid programming	
Specialty/entertainment networks	Binge TV	Cannella Media		2022					Marathons of classic television series	
Specialty/entertainment networks	Carz & Trax	Cannella Media		2021					Automotive-related entertainment programming	
Specialty/entertainment networks	Magnificent Movies Network	Cannella Media		2019					Classic public domain movies, and paid programming	
Specialty/entertainment networks	OnTV4U	Cannella Media		2006					Paid programming	
Specialty/entertainment networks	RVTV	Cannella Media		2019					Recreational and outdoor programming	
Specialty/entertainment networks	Timeless TV	Cannella Media		2019					Classic public domain sitcoms, and paid programming	
Specialty/entertainment networks	AMGTV	Access Media Group		2006	4.39%		1	22	General entertainment	
Specialty/entertainment networks	Soul of the South Television	SSN Media Group, LP		2013	17%	20,128,000	4	7	African-American programming	
Music	California Music Channel	CMC Broadcasting Company, Inc.		1982					Regional music video network	
Music	The Country Network	TCN Country, LLC		2009	17%	20,128,000	7	33	Country music videos	
Music	Heartland	Get After It Media		2012	22.51%	23,342,140	2	44	Country music/lifestyle	
Family	The Family Channel	ValCom / Get After It Media		2008	5%	5,920,000	4	21	Classic series and films	Called My Family TV until 2014.
Family	Positiv (Note: Positiv is carried on the digital subchannels of local Trinity Broadcast Network stations, selected additional affiliates and cable/satellite providers, while TBN Inspire is carried only on local TBN affiliates. Both networks are owned by TBN.)	Trinity Broadcasting Network		2003	40%	47,360,000	36	10	Christian and family-oriented movies	
Home shopping	HSN	Qurate Retail Group		1985	59%	68,204,000	41	46		
Home shopping	HSN2	Qurate Retail Group		2010			41	46		
Home shopping	QVC	Qurate Retail Group		1986	59%	68,204,000	48	13		
Home shopping	QVC2	Qurate Retail Group		2013	56.98%	178,056,986	5	187		
Home shopping	QVC3	Qurate Retail Group		2016			0	5		
Home shopping	Jewelry Television	Multimedia Commerce Group, Inc.		1993	22%	26,048,000	16	114	Jewelry shopping	
Home shopping	Shop LC	Vaibhav Global		2007	8%	9,472,000	0	42	Jewelry shopping	
News/opinion	Biz Television	Center Post Media, Inc.		2009	17%	19,788,000	5	34	Business and financial information	
News/opinion	Newsmax2	Newsmax Media, LLC		2023					Conservative news and opinion	
News/opinion	Real America's Voice	Performance One Media		2020					Conservative/far-right opinion programming	
Weather	Fox Weather	Fox Corporation	Fox News Network, LLC	2021	40.11%	125,329,389	47		National weather	
Weather	WeatherNation TV	WeatherNation, Inc.	Performance One Media	2011	6.99%	21,832,067	18	7	National and local weather	
Weather	AccuWeather Channel	AccuWeather		2006	7%	8,148,000	13	4	Local weather	
Sports	Fubo Sports Network	FuboTV		2025		12,220,539				
Sports	BeIN Sports Xtra	beIN Media Group		2019	28.42%	88,798,535	31			
Sports	Pursuit Channel	Pursuit Media LLC		2008	0.23%	716,644			Sports and recreation	
Sports	Untamed Sports TV	None		2008	1.29%	4,021,177			Sports/outdoors	
Sports	YTA TV	Center Post Media		1985	33%	34,984,000	1	34	Sports/lifestyle	
Religious networks	TBN	Trinity Broadcasting Network, Inc.		1973	40%	47,360,000	39	10	Christian religious	
Religious networks	TBN Inspire	Hillsong Church / Trinity Broadcasting Network		2002	40%	47,360,000	35	9	Christian religious	
Religious networks	Daystar	Word of God Fellowship		1982	56%	64,736,000	20	80	Evangelical Christian religious	
Religious networks	3ABN	Three Angels Broadcasting Network, Inc.		1984	27%	31,968,000	2	133	Seventh-day Adventist religious	
Religious networks	Dare to Dream Network	Three Angels Broadcasting Network, Inc.		2010	13%	15,392,000		101	Seventh-day Adventist religious	
Religious networks	3ABN Proclaim!	Three Angels Broadcasting Network, Inc.		2010	13%	15,392,000		109	Seventh-day Adventist religious	
Religious networks	SonLife Broadcasting Network	Jimmy Swaggart Ministries		2010	44%	52,096,000	22	77	Christian religious	
Religious networks	Tri-State Christian Television	Tri-State Christian Television, Inc.		1977	9%	27,992,924	8		Christian religious	
Religious networks	Cornerstone Television (Note: Cornerstone Television is not considered a television network in the traditional definition, rather it is a distributor of in-house produced programming. Although the main station, WPCB-TV in Pittsburgh is carried on many owned-and-operated translators, its full-power and LPTV "affiliates" typically air one or two Cornerstone-produced programs per week scheduled at different times than on WPCB and do not identify themselves as "Cornerstone Television" affiliates.)	Cornerstone Television, Inc.		1979 (Note: Although Cornerstone Television was founded in 1970, the network did not begin even limited broadcasts until 1979.)	7.94%	24,796,415	2	12	Christian religious	
Religious networks	Hope Channel	Hope Channel International, Inc.		2003	6.74%	21,058,587	0	15	Seventh-day Adventist religious	
Religious networks	CBN News Channel	Christian Broadcasting Network		2020					Religious-based news and opinion	
Religious networks	The Walk TV	TW Broadcasting, LLC		2010	7.52%	23,506,549	3	12	Christian religious	
Religious networks	Christian Television Network	Christian Television Network, Inc.		1979	5%	5,780,000	11	5	Christian religious	
Religious networks	God TV	Angel Christian Television Trust Inc.		1995	5%	5,780,000	2		Christian religious	
Religious networks	World Harvest Television	Family Broadcasting Corporation		1985 (Note: Date at which WHTV acquired two additional stations. World Harvest Television is a product of LeSea Broadcasting.)	5%	5,780,000	7	4	Religious and secular family entertainment programs	
Religious networks	EWTN	Eternal Word Television Network Inc.		1981	3.50%	10,928,781	1	7	Catholic religious	
Religious networks	The Word Network	Adell Broadcasting Corporation		2000	1.5%	1,734,000	2			
Religious networks	Total Living Network	Total Living International, Inc.	TLN Media	1973	1%	1,156,000	1	0	Christian religious	
Religious networks	God's Learning Channel	Prime Time Christian Broadcasting, Inc.		1982	0.25%	289,000	5	0	Messianic Judaism	
Religious networks	Peace TV			2006	15%	17,760,000	7		Islamic religious	

=== Spanish language/international services ===
Genre/type	Name	Owner	Subsidiary	Launch date	% of U.S. households reached	# of households viewable	# of full-power affiliates	# of low-power/class-A affiliates	Language	Description	Notes
Commercial networks	Univision	TelevisaUnivision		1986	49%	94,100,000	62	26	Spanish		
Commercial networks	UniMás	TelevisaUnivision		2002	43%	59,600,000	35	24	Spanish		
Commercial networks	Telemundo	Comcast	NBCUniversal Telemundo Enterprises/NBCUniversal Filmed and Entertainment	1984	61.60%	92,476,422	54	46	Spanish		
Commercial networks	TeleXitos	Comcast	NBCUniversal Telemundo Enterprises/NBCUniversal Filmed and Entertainment	2012	42.46%	32,661,468	25	1	Spanish		
Commercial networks	Estrella TV	MediaCo		2009	46%	64,232,000	38	29	Spanish		
Commercial networks	LATV	LATV Networks, LLC		2007			16		Bilingual (English/Spanish) entertainment		
Commercial networks	Canal 6	Grupo Multimedios		1968	2.22%	6,942,039			Spanish		
Commercial networks	Mega TV	Spanish Broadcasting System		2006	6%	6,984,000	5		Spanish		
Commercial networks	Novelisima	Grupo Cisneros	Cisneros Media	2021	0.46%	1,425,200			Spanish	Telenovelas/lifestyle	
Commercial networks	AsiaVision	AsiaVision, Inc.		1989					Multiple (English/Asian)		
Commercial networks	Diya TV	Ravi Kapur		2009					English / Hindi / Punjabi		
Commercial networks	New Tang Dynasty Television	Epoch Media Group		2001					Multiple (mainly Chinese and English)		
Commercial networks	VIETV	Kevin Ngo		2011					Vietnamese	Telenovelas/lifestyle	
Commercial networks	Arirang TV	Korea International Broadcasting Foundation		1997					Multiple (English, Korean, Chinese, Spanish, Arabic, Russian, Vietnamese and Indonesian)	Korean news and cultural programming	
Commercial networks	Arirang Radio	Korea International Broadcasting Foundation		2003					English	Korean news and cultural programming	
Commercial networks	KBS America	Korean Broadcasting System		2005					Korean		
Commercial networks	Munhwa Broadcasting Corporation	Government of South Korea through The Foundation of Broadcast Culture (70%) / Chungsoo Scholarship Foundation (30%)		1969					Korean		
Commercial networks	SBS America	SBS International, Inc.							Korean		
Religious networks	Enlace (Note: Enlace is carried on the digital subchannels of local TBN affiliates in select markets, but is otherwise distributed via its iTBN streaming service.)	Trinity Broadcasting Network, Inc.		2002	41%	48,554,000	37	9	Spanish		
Religious networks	3ABN Latino	Three Angels Broadcasting Network		2003	20%	23,680,000	0	124	Spanish		
Religious networks	Almavision	Almavision Hispanic Network		2002	8%	9,472,000	9		Spanish		
Religious networks	Tvida Vision			2005	0.7%	809,200	0	2	Spanish		
Religious networks	Tele Vida Abundante			1985	0.32%	1,004,355	0	3	Spanish	Spanish religious (Jewish)	

== Current networks ==
=== Conventional commercial networks ===
- American Broadcasting Company (ABC) – The nation's third-largest commercial network, ABC was originally formed from the NBC Blue Network (1927–45), a radio network which the Federal Communications Commission (FCC) forced NBC (National Broadcasting Company) to sell in 1943 for anti-monopoly reasons, the ABC-TV network began broadcasting in 1948. Owned by The Walt Disney Company, ABC airs original programming, sports, and news seven days a week. It has over 200 owned-and-operated and affiliate stations, almost all of which air local newscasts.
- CBS (originally the Columbia Broadcasting System) – The nation's second-largest commercial network, it originated as the CBS Radio Network in 1927; the CBS-TV network commenced broadcasts in 1941. Owned by Skydance, CBS airs original programming, sports and news seven days a week. The network has over 200 owned-and-operated and affiliate stations, almost all of which air local newscasts. For most of its existence, CBS has been the nation's most watched network.
- National Broadcasting Company (NBC) – The nation's largest and oldest commercial network, the NBC-TV network was formed out of the NBC Red Network radio service, which launched in 1926; the network commenced television broadcasts in 1939. Owned by NBCUniversal, NBC airs original programming, sports and news seven days a week. It has over 200 owned-and-operated and affiliate stations, almost all of which air local newscasts.
- Fox Broadcasting Company (Fox) – The nation's fourth-largest commercial network owned by Fox Corporation, Fox was launched in October 1986 through former parent News Corporation's purchase of Metromedia earlier that year (two of the network's owned-and-operated stations once owned by that group at its founding had formed the pivot of the old DuMont Television Network, which existed from 1944 to 1956) and the purchase of the 20th Century Fox film studio, originally established in 1915 as Fox Film Corporation by William Fox and merging with 20th Century Pictures (founded 1933) in 1935, five years after founder Fox lost control. After a half-century of up and down success, the studio was bought in 1985 by News Corporation, a company founded by Australian (later British-American) newspaper chain mogul Rupert Murdoch. Fox airs first-run programming and sports seven days a week, programming two hours each night in primetime (three hours on Sundays), along with political talk program Fox News Sunday on Sunday mornings and the optional infomercial block Weekend Marketplace on Saturday mornings. (Fox also allows affiliates the option to air the Xploration Station block on Saturday mornings in place of Weekend Marketplace.) It has nearly 200 owned-and-operated and affiliate stations, almost all of which air local newscasts, with some producing newscasts in-house and others airing newscasts produced by a local affiliate of another major network.
- The CW – The CW was originally formed by CBS Corporation (which later merged with Viacom to create ViacomCBS, now one half of Skydance) and Time Warner (later WarnerMedia, which eventually merged with Discovery Inc. to form Warner Bros. Discovery then become another half of Skydance) as a replacement for The WB and UPN, both of which folded in September 2006 after 11 years of existence and whose programs formed most of its initial schedule. Nexstar Media Group, the largest owner of television stations in the country, bought a 75% stake and controlling interest in the network in 2022; Paramount Global and Warner Bros. Discovery each retain a 12.5% stake. The CW maintains approximately 100 owned-and-operated and affiliate stations in the top 100 television markets; it also has approximately 90 additional cable-only and digital subchannel affiliations in smaller TV markets through a syndication service feed known as The CW Plus. The network airs two hours of first-run programming in primetime on Monday through Sunday, as well as a three-hour children's programming block on Saturday mornings called One Magnificent Morning and some sports coverage on weekends. Unlike the larger networks, The CW does not directly own its flagship station in New York City; WPIX is instead owned by Mission Broadcasting and operated under a LMA by Nexstar. Some CW affiliates air local newscasts, most of which are produced by another station in the market though four of its affiliates (most owned by Nexstar) produce local newscasts in-house, and some Nexstar-owned stations carry additional content from sister cable news channel News Nation.
- MyNetworkTV – MyNetworkTV is a syndication service owned by Fox Corporation, which is also parent of the Fox network. It was hastily formed in February 2006 to provide programming for stations left out of affiliation with The CW, after CBS Corporation and Time Warner chose to shut down UPN and The WB to form that network. The network launched in September 2006 with a format of English-language telenovelas, but gradually switched to mainly low-budget programming by the end of its first year. Since it converted from a broadcast network into a syndication service in 2010, MyNetworkTV fills its two-hour primetime schedule on Monday through Fridays with reruns of drama series that originated on other broadcast and cable networks. Some MyNetworkTV affiliates air local newscasts, most of which are produced by another station in the market though three of its affiliates (most owned by Nexstar) produce local newscasts in-house. Some affiliates also carry the nightly scheduled out of primetime to accommodate those newscasts and alternate programming (or in the case of several affiliates are primary Fox affiliates), and offer MyNetworkTV as a late night offering instead. For the Fox Television Stations group, most of its stations now brand as a "Plus" station of the larger Fox O&O station if part of a duopoly.
- Ion Television – Ion Television (originally known as Pax TV from 1998 to 2005, i: Independent Television from 2005 to 2007) is a mid-sized network and FAST television channel owned by the Scripps Networks subsidiary of the E. W. Scripps Company; it airs off-network repeats of recent television series (usually a daily block of one series) for eighteen hours per day, along with sports, most notably women's sports, including the WNBA basketball on Friday nights and NWSL soccer on Saturdays. Ion is the largest English-language network that is responsible for handling nearly all programming on behalf of its affiliates, some of which run some limited local programming and overflow programming from Scripps sister stations in the same market. It has around 48 owned-and-operated and 23 affiliated stations, the majority of which were owned by former parent Ion Media; Ion is available in markets without an over-the-air (OTA) affiliate via a national feed that is distributed to pay-TV providers and AVOD streaming services, along with a group of stations spun out to a separately owned Ion-only broadcast group, Inyo Broadcast Holdings. As Pax TV and i, it aired several hours a week of original programming in primetime (often produced in conjunction with NBC).

=== Minor and digital multicast commercial networks ===
- MeTV (a backronym for "Memorable Entertainment Television") – MeTV is a network owned by Weigel Broadcasting that airs reruns of classic series from the 1950s to the 1990s sourced primarily from the CBS Media Ventures, NBCUniversal Syndication Studios and Warner Bros. Domestic Television Distribution program libraries, as well as some limited content from Weigel. The network maintains over 160 affiliates (mainly through digital subchannel affiliations, with a small number of stations carrying it as a primary network affiliation), making it the most widely distributed multicast network, and often out-rating programming on The CW despite its much smaller original programming division.
  - MeTV+ - MeTV's sister network also owned by Weigel Broadcasting that airs more reruns of classic series from the 1950s to the 1990s from the CBS Media Ventures, NBCUniversal Syndication Studios, Sony Pictures Television, and Disney Platform Distribution program libraries, also with some limited content from Weigel. MeTV+ was launched in 2021.
  - MeTV Toons - A third sister network launched in June 2024 carrying older animated content, mainly from Warner Bros. Animation, along with third-party animated content from Paramount Skydance, NBCUniversal, Sony Pictures Television, WildBrain, and Shout! Studios.
- Story Television – Story Television, a digital multicast network also owned by Weigel Broadcasting launched on March 28, 2022. The network's focus is on historical and factual programming and utilizes the library of the cable network History, expanding its non-fiction offerings beyond Through the Decades.
- WEST - Western Entertainment Series Television, a digital multiclast network also owned by Weigel Broadcasting launched on September 29, 2025. The network's focus is on classic TV western programming.
- Antenna TV – Antenna TV is a digital multicast network owned by Nexstar Media Group; launched on January 1, 2011, the network carries classic series from the 1950s to the 1970s sourced from the programming libraries of Sony Pictures Television, NBCUniversal Syndication Studios and Disney Platform Distribution, as well as other distributors.
- Rewind TV – Rewind TV is a companion network to Antenna TV also owned by Nexstar which specifically carries sitcoms from the 1980s and 1990s. The network launched on September 1, 2021.
- Movies! – Movies! is a digital multicast network owned as a joint venture between Weigel Broadcasting and Fox Television Stations; launched on May 23, 2013 and natively transmitted in the 16:9 format, the network features theatrically released feature films from the 1920s to the 1980s primarily sourced from the 20th Century Studios library, as well as select titles from Sony Pictures Entertainment and Paramount Pictures, most of which are broadcast in the aspect ratio to which they were originally produced. Movies! maintains subchannel-only affiliations with approximately 45 stations.
- Bounce TV – Bounce TV is a digital multicast network owned by the Scripps Networks subsidiary of the E. W. Scripps Company; co-founded by Martin Luther King III and Andrew Young, and launched on September 26, 2011. Its programming is aimed at African Americans between the ages of 25 and 54, featuring a mix of acquired sitcoms, game shows, talk shows, original programs, and feature films. Bounce TV maintains affiliations with approximately 45 stations (the vast majority of which are subchannel-only affiliations), primarily in markets with sizeable African-American populations.
- Cozi TV – Cozi TV is a digital multicast network owned by the NBCUniversal Owned Television Stations subsidiary of NBCUniversal; launched on January 1, 2013, the network carries classic series from the 1950s to the 1990s sourced from the NBCUniversal Television Distribution programming library, as well as lifestyle programming and feature films. Cozi TV traces its history to the 2010 launch of NBC Nonstop, a local news and lifestyle programming subchannel format that spread to most of NBC's owned-and-operated stations. The network maintains approximately 65 affiliates, including all of NBC's owned-and-operated stations (nearly all of which carry the network on digital subchannels).
- Great Entertainment Television – (formerly as Get, a backronym for "Great Entertainment Television"; originally GetTV from 2014 to 2023) is a digital multicast network owned by Sony Pictures Entertainment; launched on February 13, 2014, the network originally focused on classic theatrically released films from the 1920s to the 1960s sourced mainly from Sony Pictures library. Most were broadcast in the aspect ratio to which they were originally produced. However, due to the network's native 4:3 transmission, films presented in widescreen are presented with letterboxing). The network began incorporating classic television series from the 1960s to the 2000s into its schedule in 2017, and transitioned full-time to that format by 2020. The network maintains subchannel-only affiliations with approximately 64 affiliates, along with a bulk carriage agreement with their Sony sister networks on Dish Network.
- Comet – Comet is a digital multicast network owned by Sinclair Broadcast Group and operated by Amazon-owned Metro-Goldwyn-Mayer through its MGM Television division; launched on October 31, 2015; the network features sci-fi and fantasy-based programming sourced primarily from the MGM television and film library. Comet maintains affiliations with 100 stations (nearly all of which carry the network on digital subchannels).
- Charge! – Charge! is a digital multicast network owned by Sinclair Broadcast Group and operated by MGM Television; launched on February 28, 2017; the network features action and adventure-based programming sourced primarily from the MGM television and film library. Charge! maintains affiliations with 56 stations (nearly all of which carry the network on digital subchannels).
- Court TV – A renewal of the format which was formerly a cable channel until its 2007 relaunch as TruTV, Court TV is a digital multicast network owned by the Scripps Networks subsidiary of the E. W. Scripps Company licensing the branding and format from WBD; launched on May 8, 2019 and intrinsically transmitted in the 16:9 format (although some programs are stretched to 16:9 if already unavailable in the format), the network features crime-themed programs such as true crime documentary series, legal dramas, and coverage of prominent criminal cases. Court TV maintains subchannel-only affiliations with approximately 65 affiliates.
- Ion Mystery – Ion Mystery (originally known as Escape until 2019, then Court TV Mystery until 2022) is a digital multicast network owned by the Scripps Networks subsidiary of the E. W. Scripps Company; launched on August 8, 2014 and intrinsically transmitted in the 16:9 format (although some programs are stretched to 16:9 if already unavailable in the format), the network features crime-focused documentary series, as well as theatrically released mystery and crime drama films aimed at a female audience. Ion Mystery maintains subchannel-only affiliations with approximately 35 affiliates.
- Grit – Grit is a digital multicast network owned by the Scripps Networks subsidiary of the E. W. Scripps Company; launched on August 8, 2014 and intrinsically transmitted in the 16:9 format (although some programs are stretched to 16:9 if already unavailable in the format), the network features theatrically released action and western films, as well as a limited amount of classic series aimed at a male audience. Grit maintains subchannel-only affiliations with around 45 stations.
- WeatherNation TV – WeatherNation TV is a television and online network owned by WeatherNation, LLC; launched on October 27, 2011 and natively transmitted in the 16:9 format. The network features national and regional weather forecasts and analysis. The network's broadcast affiliates also air local weather updates provided by the station's weather staff or via an automated graphical segment. The network maintains subchannel-only affiliations with approximately 35 stations; WeatherNation is also available on select cable and satellite providers, as well as via streaming on computers, mobile devices and Smart TVs.
- Roar – A digital multicast network owned by Sinclair Broadcast Group; launched on February 13, 2017 as TBD, the network originally carried various web-originated films, scripted and unscripted series, showcase programming, and featurettes on a wide range of topical and themed categories including, but not limited to, science, fashion, lifestyle, travel, music, comedy, gaming, e-sports, and viral content. Some traditional full-length films and documentaries also aired on the network. In 2021, the network began transitioning to a general entertainment format, incorporating reality competition series along viral content-based programming; Roar later shifted to an alternative comedy format in 2024, focusing on reruns of unscripted and sketch comedy series such as NBC's SNL. Roar maintains subchannel-only affiliations with 55 stations owned and/or operated by Sinclair.
- Catchy Comedy – A digital multicast network owned by Weigel Broadcasting; launched officially on May 25, 2015 after a soft launch on January 16, the network carries classic television sitcoms from the 1950s to the 2000s. It was originally known as Decades from 2015 to 2023, with a more generalized classic programming format, incorporating comedic, dramatic, variety and documentary programming pertaining to a certain year per day.
- Start TV – Start TV is a digital multicast network owned by a joint venture between Paramount Skydance and Weigel Broadcasting; launched on September 3, 2018, the network carries crime drama and mystery series from the 1980s through the 2000s, with a focus on police and legal procedurals geared toward female audiences. Start TV maintains subchannel-only affiliations with 27 stations.
- Heroes & Icons – Heroes & Icons (abbreviated as "H&I") is a digital multicast network owned by Weigel Broadcasting; launched in September 2014, the network carries classic series and films intended to attract a generally male audience (featuring a mix of action series, police procedurals, westerns, science fiction/fantasy series and military-themed series). Heroes & Icons maintains affiliations with around 15 stations (nearly all of which carry the network as a subchannel-only affiliation).
- Buzzr – Buzzr is a digital multicast network owned by FremantleMedia North America; launched on June 1, 2015, the network carries classic game shows sourced from FremantleMedia's extensive library. The network traces its roots to a YouTube channel of the same name created and produced by Fremantle's digital content studio Tiny Riot, which first introduced in late 2014 and featured classic game show clips, and short-form adaptations of its game show properties with internet celebrities as contestants. Buzzr maintains affiliations with 51 stations (most of which carry the network as a subchannel-only affiliation).
- Retro Television Network – Retro Television Network (branded as "Retro TV") is a digital multicast network owned by Luken Communications; launched in September 2005 as the first multicast network to rely on older acquired programs, the network carries a mix of classic series from the 1950s to the 1970s (including some public domain programming), along with recent imported series and feature films. Retro Television Network maintains affiliations with approximately 85 stations (most of which carry the network as a subchannel-only affiliation, and are mostly owned by parent Luken Communications).
- YTA TV – A successor to Channel America and formerly named America One and Youtoo America, YTA TV is a network featuring general entertainment programming (which is wholly scheduled by the network for its affiliates), with a heavy emphasis on primetime sports programming and events; it maintains affiliations with approximately 60 stations. America One merged with Youtoo TV in Spring 2015, a cable service which dates back to 1985 as a network with different names and formats along owners, including the Nostalgia Channel and American Life Network.
- Game Show Central – Game Show Central was originally launched by Sony Pictures Television Networks in March 2020, as a digital ad-supported streaming channel airing archived original game shows broadcast by parent cable channel Game Show Network. In February 2025, Sony began distributing Game Show Central as an over-the-air multicast network (primarily on stations owned by The E. W. Scripps Company and Inyo Broadcast Holdings), featuring a separate schedule incorporating Game Show Network originals not carried on the streaming channel.

Additionally, several of the cable-oriented theme channels (e.g. music video or shopping channels) have obtained broadcast clearances, usually on low-power stations, in many markets.

=== Spanish-language commercial networks ===
- Univision – The flagship American property of TelevisaUnivision, Univision was formed in 1986 following the sale of predecessor Spanish International Network (SIN) to Hallmark from Mexican broadcaster Televisa due to federal laws that restrict foreign ownership of U.S. TV networks. The network airs a mix of telenovelas, news and variety programming (either produced by the network or sourced primarily from Televisa), as well as soccer events and occasional Mexican-imported feature films. It is the nation's largest commercial Spanish-language network, with approximately 120 owned-and-operated and affiliate stations (including over 50 full-power stations); Univision is available in markets without an over-the-air affiliate via a national feed (east and west channels) that is distributed to satellite providers. Most of its stations produce and/or broadcast local newscasts, usually limited to weekday morning and evening time slots in most markets. Since the mid-2000s, Univision has ranked as the fifth highest-rated commercial network overall on average, currently placing ahead of English language competitor The CW.
- Telemundo – Telemundo is a general entertainment network owned by NBCUniversal; the network carries a mix of original and imported telenovelas, general and entertainment news programs, feature films (both dubbed and natively produced in Spanish), sports and variety programming (much of the network's programming is filmed in the network's homebase of Miami, although its imported programming is sourced from Latin American countries: Mexico, Colombia and to a lesser extent, Brazil). The nation's second-largest commercial Spanish-language network, Telemundo has over 100 owned-and-operated and affiliate stations (including approximately 40 full-power stations); it is also available in Mexico and Puerto Rico (where it was founded in 1954 as the brand name for WKAQ-TV). Most Telemundo stations air local newscasts, primarily aired in morning and evening timeslots, although some affiliates also produce public affairs programming. Telemundo is available in markets without an over-the-air affiliate via a national feed (east and west channels) that is distributed to cable and satellite providers.
- UniMás (known as TeleFutura from its launch in January 2002 until January 2013) – UniMás is a secondary general entertainment network owned by TelevisaUnivision, which airs a mix of original and imported programming, consisting of telenovelas, Spanish-dubbed versions of U.S. feature films and sports programming aimed primarily at teenagers and young adults ages 12 to 34. UniMás maintains nearly 45 owned-and-operated and affiliate stations (including 35 full-power stations), and is the third-largest commercial Spanish-language network in the U.S.; UniMás is available in markets without an over-the-air affiliate via a national feed (east and west channels) that is distributed to satellite providers.
- Estrella TV – Estrella TV is a general entertainment network owned by MediaCo; it airs mainly original variety programming, as well as general and entertainment news programming, limited scripted programming and imported Mexican feature films, along with content from Mexico's TV Azteca. The network was launched in 2009, featuring programming originally produced for the Liberman-owned Spanish language independent stations that formed the nucleus of the network. Estrella TV maintains nearly 35 owned-and-operated and affiliate stations (most of which are owned by MediaCo or carry the network as a subchannel-only affiliation), and is the fourth-largest commercial Spanish-language network; it is also available nationally on select cable providers.
- Canal 6 – Formerly known as Multimedios, Canal 6 (for its national channel number in Mexico) is a general entertainment network based out of Monterrey, Nuevo León which features mainly live studio variety programming and news, and is a major regional network in Northeastern Mexico which also features several stations along the Southern Texas border, and tailors their programming (and through local stations, news programming) to both Mexican and American viewers; it began to make a national push in the 2020s with the launch of a Mexico City station, whose programming features on the American schedule. The network is distributed through several separately owned over-the-air affiliates in the U.S. mainly in the Southwest and southern Texas, and nationally through cable providers and DirecTV.
- LATV – LATV is a bilingual general entertainment network owned by LATV Networks, LLC; originated as a programming format on KJLA in Los Angeles, the network's lone owned-and-operated station, it became a national network in 2007. It relies largely on unscripted programming aimed at young adults between the ages of 18 and 34, featuring a mix of variety, music, lifestyle and talk programs (most of which are sourced by MVS Television and Multimedios Televisión); LATV also airs a limited amount of English language programming, including overnight content from cable/satellite shopping network Shop LC. LATV maintains nearly 40 owned-and-operated and affiliate stations (available mostly on low-power stations).
- TeleXitos (originally known as Exitos TV from 2012 to December 2014) – TeleXitos is a digital multicast network owned by NBCUniversal; maintaining affiliations with 15 Telemundo owned-and-operated stations, the network originally carried a format featuring repeats of telenovelas (mainly those aired by Telemundo), before rebranding in December 2014 to feature Spanish-dubbed versions of American classic action-adventure series and feature films, effectively acting as a Spanish counterpart to fellow network Cozi TV.

Additionally, Televisa, which distributes programming to Univision in the United States, operates in Mexico, but the company's networks (Canal de las Estrellas, Canal 5 and Nueve) have certain stations which can be received in parts of the U.S. located along and near the Mexican border, and likewise with the American networks have affiliates located or receivable in Mexican border cities. Some Mexican border stations (such as the former English-language ABC/Fox/CW affiliate XETV-TDT in Tijuana) who formerly maintained affiliations with U.S.-based English or Spanish networks, but mainly targeted their programming at their American border city (more than the Mexican metropolitan area that they are based in or merely licensed to).

Although the English-language programming model in the U.S. traditionally relies on the network and its stations handling programming responsibilities, Spanish language networks handle most of the responsibility for programming, while affiliates are limited to breakaways from the network feed to provide local news, public affairs and/or entertainment programming as well as local advertising. As such, all Spanish language networks primarily available on broadcast TV operate national feeds that are distributed to cable and satellite providers in markets without a local affiliate. Spanish-language independent stations also exist, although (particularly with the launch of Estrella TV), these are very limited and they mainly exist in markets with a large Hispanic and Latino American population.

=== Public/cultural/educational non-commercial ===
- PBS (Public Broadcasting Service) – PBS is the largest public broadcasting network in the U.S., with somewhat decentralized operations (PBS is essentially owned through a consortium of its member stations, reversing the traditional network-station ownership model). The network operates or has operated 24-hour program feeds carried part-time or full-time by its member stations, the PBS Satellite Service (which maintains feeds for the Eastern and Pacific Time Zones, and was originally conceived as a cable-only channel for areas not served by a PBS station), PBS YOU (devoted largely to adult education, crafts, and public affairs programming, which ceased operations in January 2006), the PBS Kids Channel (a children's programming network, which was discontinued on September 26, 2005 (though later revived on January 16, 2017) in favor of the ad-supported cable channel PBS Kids Sprout [ended nearly 20 years ago]). PBS allows its member stations to run the network's programs out of pattern; member stations generally produce their own local programming in the form of news (mainly weekly news/analysis series, though a few stations carry daily newscasts), documentary and lifestyle programming that is aired alongside the PBS schedule.
- NYC Media – NYC Media is the broadcasting service of the City of New York, which offers original programming. Available nationally on PBS stations, NYC Media in actuality, serves as a provider of programming to several noncommercial broadcasters in New York outside of its originating station, WNYE-TV.
- Annenberg Channel – Originally known as Annenberg/CPB Channel and formerly operating as a national educational access network for public broadcasters and schools that broadcast Annenberg/CPB programs, Annenberg Channel was available on some cable and satellite providers; it now operates as an online streaming service that is offered for carriage by broadcast stations and cable providers; many of the channel's broadcast affiliates carried its programming to fill overnight and "fringe" timeslots (with only a few still doing so). It shared some programming with PBS YOU, various university- and college-owned stations around the U.S., and the now-defunct Research Channel.
- Deutsche Welle (DW-TV) – Deutsche Welle is a Germany-based, non-commercial television service which provides some English-language news programming to public TV stations; its programming feed is available part-time on select educational independent stations, including some stations carried on the World Channel. DW-TV is also carried full time on some stations, and on some cable providers serving a large German diaspora.
- Create – Create is a digital multicast network owned by American Public Television (in partnership with PBS, member stations WGBH-TV (Boston), WNET and WLIW (New York), and the National Educational Television Association), offering instructional (consisting of cooking, crafts and home improvement series) and travel programming; the network was launched in January 2006 in part to fill the void left by the shut down of PBS YOU, and its primarily carried on the subchannels of PBS member stations.
- JBC World – A Japanese-based noncommercial television station that provides English-language news and other programs from JBC.
- World Channel (also referred to as "World") – World is a digital multicast network owned by American Public Television (in partnership with PBS, WGBH-TV, WNET, WLIW and the National Educational Television Association), which primarily carries news and documentary programming.
- First Nations Experience (FNX) – FNX is a non-profit television network owned by the San Bernardino Community College District that airs programs aimed to Native Americans as well as Indigenous audiences. The network currently has 47 affiliates, most of which are part of PBS stations and universities.

=== Religious ===
- Cornerstone Television
- Daystar Television Network
- Eternal Word Television Network (EWTN) – Roman Catholic, primarily cable-based
- GEB America (Oral Roberts University)
- God's Learning Channel – Hebrew and Jewish roots of the Christian Faith
- Hope Channel – Seventh-day Adventist
- Loma Linda Broadcasting Network (LLBN)
- RadiantTV - Radiant TV is the brand for WLMB's overnight music block, consisting of nature scenes set to Christian music in a format similar to the now-discontinued Worship Network. WLMB syndicates Radiant TV to other Christian television networks, making it available nationwide.
- Trinity Broadcasting Network (TBN) – Ecumenical Christian
- Three Angels Broadcasting Network (3ABN) – Seventh-day Adventist
- Total Living Network (TLN) - carries lifestyle-oriented Christian televangelism, infomercials, and a limited number of secular lifestyle programs.
- Unity Broadcasting Network – five low-power stations
- World Harvest Television (WHT)/Family Broadcasting Corporation and fetv – family-oriented secular and religious programming (available over-the-air, live streaming platforms, and on satellite)
- The Word Network – African American Christian network

Several religious networks allow their broadcast affiliates to carry their programming out-of-pattern through clearance arrangements, notably TBN, 3ABN, Hope Channel and World Harvest Television.

== Defunct networks ==
- American Independent Network – A commercial broadcast network, which operated from the mid-1990s to December 3, 2001; predecessor to UATV
- America's Store – A cable and satellite shopping network spun off from the Home Shopping Network, which operated from 1988 to April 3, 2007; its broadcast affiliates were a mix of stations that carried the network full-time as well as overnight clearances on minor network affiliates and independent stations.
- AZN Television (originally known as International Channel) – A broadcast and cable network, which operated from 1996 to April 9, 2008, featuring a mix of international programming, which launched before the advent of digital cable and satellite services that allowed carriage of various foreign networks; the AZN iteration offered programming aimed at English-speaking Asian-Americans.
- Azteca América – A general entertainment network owned by INNOVATE Corp. under a license by the Azteca International Corporation, which operated from July 28, 2001 to December 31, 2022. The network featured programming primarily sourced from the Mexican Azteca networks (though much of the American network's programming aired at different times), along with original and imported programming from other U.S. and Latin American distributors; it carried a mix of telenovelas, feature films (both dubbed and natively produced in Spanish), sports, news and variety programming. Azteca América maintained approximately 90 affiliates (including eight full-power stations); it was also available nationally on select cable providers.
- Badger Television Network – A short-lived television network consisting of three stations in Wisconsin; operated from January to August 1958.
- The Box (originally Video Jukebox Network) – A music video network with a viewer request format, which operated from 1985 to 2001, at which time the network was purchased by Viacom and replaced by MTV2. All of MTV2's remaining broadcast affiliates were former affiliates of The Box.
- Channel America – A commercial broadcast network which operated from 1988 to 1995; it was the first commercial television network whose affiliate body was intentionally made up of low-power stations, serving as a model for Pax and AIN/UATV, and a predecessor of America One and YTA TV.
- CV Network (formally CaribeVisión) – A Spanish-language network, which operated from 2007 to July 31, 2012; network closed prior to the launch of MundoFox.
- Doctor Television Channel – A network that aired programming promoting a healthy lifestyle, mainly carried on DTV America stations. Ceased operations in 2019.
- DuMont Television Network – A commercial broadcast network owned by DuMont Laboratories, which operated from 1946 to 1956; two of its owned-and-operated stations are now owned by the Fox Television Stations subsidiary of Fox Corporation as O&Os of the Fox network.
- FamilyNet – A general interest cable network owned by the Rural Media Group; launched in 1988, it went through several owners and mainly featured a religious format; owners included Jerry Falwell and the Southern Baptist Convention before its acquisition by the Rural Media Group, the parent of the rural-focused RFD-TV in 2013. After its sale it programmed a slate of classic television programming from Sony Pictures Television until July 1, 2017, when Rural Media converted it to a Western-focused sports network, The Cowboy Channel; all remaining over-the-air carriage agreements were nullified.
- Fave TV – A multicast network owned by the CBS Entertainment Group, a subsidiary of Paramount Skydance airing reality television and sitcom reruns from and already airing on Paramount's cable networks. Only carried by CBS-owned stations, it was shut down without notice on February 2, 2026.
- TheGrio – General entertainment multicast network aimed at Black audiences (named for the co-owned news website originally founded in 2009 by NBC News) launched by Entertainment Studios (now Allen Media Group) in January 2021 over the former channel space of Light TV; TheGrio assumed Black News Channel's pay television and FAST streaming agreements and selected news content after Entertainment Studios purchased the assets of the bankrupt cable news network in July 2022; the network's over-the-air multicast feed abruptly ceased operations on January 1, 2025, with TheGrio remaining available as a cable and FAST streaming channel.
- Hispanic Television Network – A family-oriented Spanish-language network, which operated from 2000 to July 10, 2003.
- Hughes Television Network (HTN; originally Sports Network Incorporated) – A sports-based broadcast network later owned by businessman Howard Hughes, which operated from 1956 to the 1970s.
- Inmigrante TV – The station was founded in 2010 by immigration attorney Manuel Solis. Much of the programming consists of advertising for Solis' law firm. Ceased operations in mid-2010s.
- ImaginAsian – The company ceased operations in 2011, with the television network becoming MNet.
- La Familia Cosmovision – A Spanish-language family-oriented network; ceased operations on December 31, 2014.
- LAT TV – A Spanish-language network offering family-oriented and educational programming, which operated from May 19, 2006 to May 20, 2008.
- Light TV - A family-oriented network from MGM and Mark Burnett. Was acquired by Allen Media Group in 2020 and was renamed and reformatted to TheGrio the following year.
- MGM Family Network – A commercial broadcast network, which launched in 1973.
- Más Música – A Spanish-language music video network, which operated from 1998 to January 2006; predecessor of MTV's Tr3s.
- MHz WorldView – An independent, American, non-commercial public television network that broadcast newscasts and other programs from around the world from October 19, 2005 to March 1, 2020.
- Mizlou Television Network – An occasional over-the-air broadcast network and sports syndication service, which operated from 1961 to 1991.
- Mobil Showcase Network – An occasional over-the-air broadcast network, which operated in the 1950s.
- MTV2 – A general entertainment and music network owned by Viacom, which remains distributed mainly on cable and satellite providers; it became a broadcast network on January 1, 2001 when it assumed the operations of The Box, but slowly dropped its broadcast affiliates in subsequent years as existing affiliation contracts expired.
- MundoMax – MundoMax was a general entertainment network operated by Colombian broadcaster RCN Televisión SA. Launched in August 2012 as MundoFox in partnership with Fox International Networks, the network broadcast original and imported telenovelas and teleseries, as well as feature films (both dubbed and natively produced in Spanish), news and variety programming, with some imported content being sourced by RCN and NTN24. MundoMax maintained approximately 60 affiliate stations (consisting of mostly low-power stations with some full-power affiliates, with some Fox Television Stations-owned outlets carrying the network via subchannel-only affiliations to alleviate availability issues in markets where the network had a low-power affiliate and/or limited cable distribution before Fox International Channels sold its stake in MundoFox to RCN Televisión in July 2015. Some MundoMax stations aired local newscasts, while some also carry public affairs programs. The network ceased broadcast on November 30, 2016.
- National Educational Television (NET) – An educational broadcast network, which operated from 1952 to 1970. First named the Educational Television and Radio Center (ETRC) until 1958, then the National Educational Television and Radio Center (NETRC) until 1963. Predecessor to PBS.
- NBC Weather Plus – A weather-oriented digital multicast network owned by NBC Universal, which operated from November 15, 2004 to December 31, 2008; some affiliates subsequently replaced the service with an automated local weather channel under the brand NBC Plus.
- Network One (N1) – A small independent network featuring a mix of acquired and first-run programming, which operated from the mid-1990s to November 13, 1997.
- NewsNet – A 24-hour news network launched on January 1, 2019 as an offshoot of the rolling news formats utilized by low-power stations WMNN-LD/Cadillac, Michigan and News Channel Nebraska (both owned by network founder Eric Wotila); it was structured around a tightly formatted 30-minute newswheel format (similar to the original format of HLN), incorporating updated information covering various areas of interest (such as national news, sports, entertainment, weather and business); Bridge Media Networks (which acquired the network in 2022) abruptly shutdown NewsNet on August 2, 2024.
- NTA Film Network – A project that flourished from 1956–1962, with anchor station WNTA in New York/Newark, gaining at its height over 100 affiliates, and drawing in the larger markets some of the stations that had lost their Dumont and/or Paramount Television Network affiliation with the cessation of those networks; a few series moved directly from Dumont to NTA in 1956. Only attempted in-pattern broadcasting nationally in one season, on one night, but had some notable programming. Continued as purely a syndicator throughout the 1960s.
- Overmyer Network (ON; launched as the United Network, not to be confused with UPN) – A short-lived commercial network, which operated from May 1 to June 1, 1967.
- Paramount Television Network – A commercial broadcast network owned by Paramount Pictures, which operated from 1949 to 1953; most of its partner stations were also affiliates of major broadcast networks, relegating it to secondary affiliations in most markets.
- PBJ – A digital multicast network from Luken Communications that featured classic cartoons and children's programming that was in operation from August 2011 until March 2016 because of NBCU's acquisition of DreamWorks Animation.
- PBS Kids Channel (original 1999-2005 network) – A digital multicast network operated by PBS, which operated from 1999 to Fall 2005; some of its functions were assumed by the ad-supported cable network PBS Kids Sprout (later rebranded Universal Kids in 2017 until 2025), while some of PBS' member stations and state networks carry independently programmed digital subchannels featuring children's programs produced for broadcast on the network and through public television syndication. PBS originally planned to launch a successor service, PBS Kids Go!, in October 2006, which never launched. The PBS Kids name remains in use as the branding for PBS' children's programming block.
- PBS YOU ("YOU" being an acronym for "Your Own University") – A public television network featuring a mix of instructional, news/commentary and documentary programs, which operated from the late 1990s to 2006. Many of its affiliates joined Create, a similar service from American Public Television that focuses more on craft and travel programming, after YOU ceased operations.
- PTL Satellite Network – An Evangelical Christian religious network founded by Jim and Tammy Faye Bakker, which operated from 1977 to 1987; it was known for its flagship program, the PTL Club. The network collapsed in the wake of a sex and embezzlement scandal that resulted in Jim Bakker being sentenced to prison.
- Prime Time Entertainment Network (PTEN) – An ad-hoc syndication service operated by the Prime Time Consortium, a joint venture between Warner Bros. Television and Chris-Craft Industries, in conjunction with the service's affiliates, which operated from September 1993 to September 1997; most of PTEN's affiliates would join The WB and UPN when those networks launched in January 1995, with stations subsequently pushing its programming to other timeslots not programmed by The WB and UPN.
- Qubo: A children's network owned and operated by Ion Media (formerly, a joint venture with Scholastic, NBCU, and Corus' Nelvana), running from January 8, 2007 to February 28, 2021.
- Retro Jams – A digital multicast music video network, which operated from 2007 to 2008; it was carried by some low-power stations owned by Equity Media Holdings, most of which replaced it with the Retro Television Network; the music video format reappeared in 2009 after Equity terminated its affiliation agreements with RTN.
- Scripps News – A 24-hour news and documentary channel originally founded in 2008 as Newsy, operating as a syndication business that was acquired in 2014 by the E. W. Scripps Company; Scripps converted the brand into a cable channel operating on the former channel space onto Retirement Living TV in 2017, and relaunched it as an over-the-air broadcast and streaming network in October 2021; Scripps News converted into a FAST streaming channel on November 16, 2024.
- ShopHQ – Generally thought of as the third-rated American home shopping network (behind the co-owned HSN and QVC, whose main and subnetworks now have wide brokered subchannel clearance), cable channel ShopHQ, formerly ValueVision and ShopNBC in the past, acquired main-channel major-market carriage controversially in June 2021, when WRNN-TV Associates, which had bought several large-market stations in the late 2010s with the proceeds it received from the FCC spectrum auction for selling off the bandwidth of New York station WRNN-TV, converted the main channel of their stations to ShopHQ, which pushed out ethnic programs and broadcasters which formerly filled that space under previous ownership and generally angered viewers and carriage providers for doing so. The existing local management of one station, Honolulu, Hawaii's KIKU, openly agitated for a sale in order to restore their Asian-aimed schedule, which came to fruition through Byron Allen's Entertainment Studios. WRNN attempted to purchase the network in 2023 but was rebuffed last minute due to a higher offer accepted by ShopHQ's parent from businessperson Manoj Bhargava. The network ceased operations on April 17, 2025.
- SFM Holiday Network – A limited-run ad-hoc network that specialized in Christmas specials.
- Shop at Home Network – A home shopping network available on broadcast and cable television, which operated from 1987 to 2008; its broadcast affiliates were a mix of stations that carried the network full-time as well as overnight clearances on minor network affiliates and independent stations.
- Smile – A Christian-oriented digital multicast and cable television network launched by the Trinity Broadcasting Network on December 24, 2005 as the television branch of the network's Smile of a Child ministry (founded by TBN co-founder Jan Crouch), featuring a mix of children's religious and family-oriented programming aimed at children ages 2 to 12; the network shut down on January 12, 2025 because of Yippee.
- SOI TV – A small Spanish-language network, which operated from March 2012 to January 2013. Launched with a $20 million investment, it was founded by a Venezuelan banker and former political prisoner under that country's president Hugo Chávez, who was granted asylum in the U.S.; the network used interactive broadcast technologies allowing real-time response by viewers regarding its television content via Twitter and Facebook. SOI's programming was carried by cable network La Familia beginning in December 2012; while NBCUniversal owned Telemundo stations formerly carried the network on their digital subchannels until January 2013.
- Spanish International Network (SIN) – A Spanish-language commercial network, which operated from 1961 to 1986; it is a predecessor to Univision.
- Sports News Highlights – A 24-hour sports news network launched on May 16, 2022 as an offshoot of rolling news channel NewsNet, structured around a tightly formatted 30-minute newswheel format focused on updated sports news and highlights; network founder Bridge Media Networks abruptly shutdown Sports News Highlights on August 2, 2024.
- Stadium – Over-the-air and streaming sports network launched in August 2017 as a joint venture between Sinclair Broadcast Group and Silver Chalice as the successor to Sinclair's American Sports Network linear syndication/multicast service; Stadium converted into a streaming-only network on October 30, 2023, with its former broadcast channel space being assumed by fledgling Sinclair-owned lifestyle network The Nest.
- Star Television Network – Failed attempt at a fifth major TV network. Started out airing classic programming after launch in 1990, then planned on acquiring new programming & producing its own once on stable operating ground. Was in planning as early as 1987. Folded in 1991.
- ThinkBright – A New York-based public broadcasting network.
- This TV – A general entertainment multicast network launched in 2008 as a joint venture between Weigel Broadcasting (which transferred its share to Tribune Broadcasting in 2013) and Metro-Goldwyn-Mayer, originally featuring a mix of theatrical films, classic television series from the MGM library and children's programs. In 2024, the network converted into a format consisting mainly of unscripted series from the library of Entertainment Studios (now Allen Media Group, which acquired the network in 2021). The network quietly ceased operations on May 31, 2024.
- TouchVision – TouchVision was a digital multicast and broadband television network owned by Think Televisual, LLC; launched on September 16, 2013 with backing from Weigel Broadcasting which was discontinued on January 14, 2016. It featured blocks of national and international news content presented in a newsreel-style format, along with opinion and feature segments. TouchVision's programming was also syndicated to television stations in a few markets as a substitute for national morning or evening newscasts, carried as a morning programming block on Heroes & Icons.
- TrueReal – A short-lived Katz Broadcasting channel which was paired with the male-centric Defy TV and offered woman-centric reality programming from the A&E Networks library; aired from 2021 to 2023 and discontinued, with its programming merged to Defy and channel space leased out to Jewelry Television.
- The Tube Music Network – A music video-focused digital multicast network, which operated from 2004 to October 2007, when it folded due to financial difficulties and complications involving E/I programming.
- TuVisión – A Spanish-language commercial network owned by Pappas Telecasting Companies, which operated from 2007 to 2009.
- TV Scout – A network containing a Prevue Channel-esque scroll of all program listings in the next two hours on a market's entire television dial, including digital subchannel networks. Existed from 2012 until 2016.
- UPN (formerly an initialism for the "United Paramount Network") – A conventional general entertainment network originally owned by Viacom and Chris-Craft Industries (whose interest was acquired by Viacom in 2000, and was later spun off to CBS Corporation in 2005); operating from January 16, 1995 to September 15, 2006, CBS Corporation shut down the network to form The CW, in conjunction with The WB's co-parent Time Warner.
- Universal Sports (formerly World Championship Sports Network) – A digital multicast network offering sports programming, consisting mainly of events sanctioned for play in the Olympic Games, which operated from 2005 to December 31, 2011; at its peak, it had 56 subchannel-only affiliates (including all of NBC's owned-and-operated stations). Universal Sports transitioned into a cable and satellite-only channel on January 1, 2012, then ceased operations on November 16, 2015.
- Urban America Television (UATV) – A successor to the American Independent Network, which operated from December 3, 2001 to May 1, 2006. UATV was a small network with approximately 60 affiliates at its peak, carrying a mix of original programming, and older films and series. Aimed at Black viewing.
- Variety Television Network – A digital multicast network owned by Newport Television, whose stations served as its affiliates, which operated from 2007 to January 2009.
- The WB – A conventional general entertainment network owned by Time Warner and the Tribune Company that operated from January 11, 1995 to September 17, 2006; Time Warner shut down the network to form The CW, in conjunction with UPN parent CBS Corporation.
- The Works – A news and general entertainment network from MGM Television that launched on April 1, 2014 and aired mostly on stations owned by Titan Broadcast Group. The network closed on February 28, 2017 with the launch of Charge! which replaced it.
- Tuff TV – A digital broadcast television network owned by Seals Entertainment Group and Luken Communications LLC. The network shut down on August 26, 2018.
- The Worship Network – A Christian nature music video television network owned by Christian Network, Inc. and carried as a subchannel on stations owned by Ion Media. It shut down in 2013.
- TVS Television Network - A sports syndicator launched in the late 1980s by Chicago White Sox minority owner & vice chairman Eddie Einhorn. It would eventually go on to produce entertainment programming as well. It would cease operations in August 1993.

== See also ==
- High-definition television in the United States
- List of television stations in North America by media market
- Lists of television stations in the United States
- List of United States pay television channels
- Fourth television network
