= WNYX =

WNYX may refer to:

- WNYX-LD (1980-2023), a defunct low-power television station (channel 5, virtual 32) formerly licensed to serve New York, New York
- WNYX-LD, an unrelated low-power television station (channel 4, virtual 34) licensed to serve East Orange, New Jersey
- WNYX, the fictional radio station (585 AM) setting for the television series NewsRadio
- WJZZ (FM), a radio station (88.1 FM) licensed to serve Montgomery, New York, which held the call sign WNYX from 2009 to 2014
