= Channel 43 virtual TV stations in the United States =

The following television stations operate on virtual channel 43 in the United States:

- K07DI-D in Hinsdale, Montana
- K11IA-D in Glasgow, Montana
- K14NY-D in Sayre, Oklahoma
- K16LQ-D in Seiling, Oklahoma
- K19LA-D in Rocky Ford, Colorado
- K20BR-D in Gage, etc., Oklahoma
- K20MP-D in Lamar, Colorado
- K22BR-D in May, etc., Oklahoma
- K22LZ-D in Hollis, Oklahoma
- K23OU-D in Pueblo, Colorado
- K25QC-D in Lake Crystal, Minnesota
- K26NC-D in Elk City, Oklahoma
- K26NS-D in Fort Peck, Montana
- K27NB-D in Baton Rouge, Louisiana
- K28JX-D in Alva-Cherokee, Oklahoma
- K29HY-D in Strong City, Oklahoma
- K29HZ-D in Woodward, etc., Oklahoma
- K29NM-D in Spokane, Washington
- K31MU-D in Lingleville-Crowley, Texas
- K34NE-D in Lawton, Oklahoma
- K35MZ-D in Las Animas, Colorado
- K35OH-D in Roseburg, Oregon
- K35PK-D in Monterey, California
- K36NE-D in Las Vegas, Nevada
- K43JQ-D in Bismarck, North Dakota
- KAHC-LD in Sacramento, California
- KAUT-TV in Oklahoma City, Oklahoma
- KBIT-LD in Monterey, California
- KCDN-LD in Kansas City, Missouri
- KGMC in Merced, California
- KIWB-LD in Boise, Idaho
- KMBD-LD in Minneapolis, Minnesota
- KPDD-LD in Evergreen, Colorado
- KQAF-LD in La Junta, Colorado
- KQHD-LD in Hardin, Montana
- KRPG-LD in Des Moines, Iowa
- KRWF in Redwood Falls, Minnesota
- KSFW-LD in Dallas, Texas
- KSKT-CD in San Marcos, California
- KTMJ-CD in Topeka, Kansas
- W03BU-D in Matecumbe, Florida
- W16DQ-D in Tampa, Florida
- W25FH-D in Fort Wayne, Indiana
- W29FD-D in Columbus, Georgia
- W33EM-D in Pittsburgh, Pennsylvania
- WBXJ-CD in Jacksonville, Florida
- WDGA-CD in Dalton, Georgia
- WFXB in Myrtle Beach, South Carolina
- WGIQ in Louisville, Alabama
- WGOX-LD in Mobile, Alabama
- WHFL-CD in Goldsboro, North Carolina
- WHTX-LD in Springfield, Massachusetts
- WKOI-TV in Richmond, Indiana
- WLXI in Greensboro, North Carolina
- WPMC-CD in Mappsville, Virginia
- WPMT in York, Pennsylvania
- WSVF-CD in Harrisonburg, Virginia
- WTCN-CD in Palm Beach, Florida
- WTNZ in Knoxville, Tennessee
- WUAB in Lorain, Ohio
- WUET-LD in Savannah, Georgia
- WVBT in Virginia Beach, Virginia
- WVEN-TV in Melbourne, Florida
- WWDT-CD in Naples, Florida
- WYZZ-TV in Bloomington, Illinois
- WZME in Bridgeport, Connecticut
- WZPX-TV in Battle Creek, Michigan

The following stations, which are no longer licensed, formerly operated on virtual channel 43:

- K21NX-D in Hermiston, Washington
- K43AG-D in Edwards, California
- K43EG-D in Pitkin, Colorado
- KEJB in El Dorado, Arkansas
- KSEX-CD in San Diego, California
- KYAN-LD in Los Angeles, California
- KYHT-LD in Lake Charles, Louisiana
- W43DL-D in Montgomery, Alabama
- WNYS-TV in Syracuse, New York
- WNXY-LD in New York, New York
