= Channel 11 branded TV stations in the United States =

The following television stations in the United States brand as channel 11 (though neither using virtual channel 11 nor broadcasting on physical RF channel 11):

- KDFX-CD in Indio/Palm Springs, California
- KKFX-CD in San Luis Obispo, California
- KTVL-DT2 in Medford, Oregon
- KUAM-DT2 in Hagåtña, Guam
- KYMA-DT in Yuma, Arizona
- WBNG-DT2 in Binghamton, New York
- WCHS-DT2 in Charleston, West Virginia
- WKTV-DT2 in Utica, New York

The following television stations in the United States, which are no longer licensed, formerly branded as channel 11:

- KAAP-LP in Santa Cruz, California
- KUAM-LP in Tamuning/Hagåtña, Guam
