= List of over-the-air HSN affiliates =

The following is a list of over-the-air affiliates for HSN, a television network in the United States.

== Affiliates ==
List of HSN affiliates
Media market	State/District	Station	Channel
Birmingham	Alabama	W18ET-D	35.1
Birmingham	Alabama	WPXH-DT7	44.7
Selma–Montgomery	Alabama	WBXM-CD6	5.6
Selma–Montgomery	Alabama	WTMU-LD6	5.6
Fayetteville	Arkansas	KHOG-DT5	29.5
Fort Smith	Arkansas	KFDF-CD3	44.3
Little Rock	Arkansas	KLRA-CD6	20.6
Winslow	Arkansas	KPBI-CD3	31.3
Phoenix	Arizona	KASW-DT4	61.4
Tucson	Arizona	KTTU-DT6	18.6
Tucson	Arizona	K35OU-D	21.1
Bakersfield	California	KERO-DT7	23.7
Fresno	California	KFSN-DT4	30.4
Los Angeles	California	KCAL-DT4	9.4
Los Angeles	California	KPXN-DT8	30.8
Monterey–Salinas	California	KMBY-LD9	27.9
Monterey–Salinas	California	KMCE-LD5	43.5
Palm Springs	California	KPDI-LD9	25.9
Sacramento	California	KSPX-DT8	29.8
San Diego	California	KGTV-DT7	10.7
San Diego	California	KZSD-LD7	10.7
San Francisco	California	KGO-DT4	7.4
Santa Barbara	California	KPDY-LD11	36.11
Colorado Springs–Pueblo	Colorado	KRDO-DT6	13.6
Denver	Colorado	KCDO-DT5	3.5
Hartford–New Haven	Connecticut	WHPX-DT8	26.8
Washington	District of Columbia	WPXW-DT8	66.8
Jacksonville	Florida	W30EE-D	39.1
Jacksonville	Florida	WTLV-DT6	12.6
Miami–Fort Lauderdale	Florida	WPXM-DT6	35.6
Orlando	Florida	WOPX-DT8	56.8
Orlando	Florida	WSWF-LD11	10.11
Pensacola	Florida	W19CO-D	19.1
Tallahassee	Florida	WTXL-DT7	27.7
Tampa	Florida	W16DQ-D	43.1
Tampa	Florida	W32FH-D	33.1
Tampa	Florida	WFTS-DT5	28.5
Tampa	Florida	WXPX-DT8	66.8
West Palm Beach	Florida	WHDT-DT4	9.4
West Palm Beach	Florida	WPXP-DT8	67.8
Atlanta	Georgia	W13DQ-D	45.1
Atlanta	Georgia	WGBP-DT4	66.4
Savannah	Georgia	WJCL-DT6	22.6
Honolulu	Hawaii	KPXO-DT7	66.7
Cedar Rapids	Iowa	KPXR-DT8	48.8
Des Moines	Iowa	K32NM-D	32.1
Des Moines	Iowa	KFPX-DT8	39.8
Boise	Idaho	KTRV-DT8	12.8
Coeur d'Alene	Idaho	KMNZ-LD7	4.7
Pocatello–Idaho Falls	Idaho	KVUI-DT9	31.9
Champaign	Illinois	W27EL-D	39.1
Chicago	Illinois	WCPX-DT8	38.8
Chicago	Illinois	WRJK-LD11	22.11
Springfield	Illinois	W31EH-D	33.1
Evansville	Indiana	WEVV-DT4	44.4
Fort Wayne	Indiana	WFWC-CD3	45.3
Hammond	Indiana	WJYS-DT8	62.8
Indianapolis	Indiana	WHMB-DT4	40.4
Indianapolis	Indiana	WRTV-DT5	6.5
South Bend	Indiana	WHME-DT6	46.6
Pittsburg	Kansas	KOAM-DT6	7.6
Wichita	Kansas	K29NL-D	15.1
Bowling Green	Kentucky	WBGS-LD4	34.4
Lexington	Kentucky	WUPX-DT8	67.8
Louisville	Kentucky	WHAS-DT7	11.7
Lake Charles	Louisiana	KWWE-LD4	19.4
Monroe	Louisiana	KMCT-DT7	39.7
New Orleans	Louisiana	WPXL-DT6	49.6
New Orleans	Louisiana	K20MM-D	47.1
Shreveport	Louisiana	K30QB-D	47.1
Baltimore	Maryland	WMAR-DT8	2.8
Hagerstown	Maryland	WDVM-DT4	25.4
Bangor	Maine	WLBZ-DT8	2.8
Lewiston	Maine	WIPL-DT8	35.8
Poland Spring	Maine	WMTW-DT4	8.4
Skowhegan	Maine	WGCI-LD8	2.8
Cadillac–Traverse City	Michigan	WWTV-DT6	9.6
Cadillac–Traverse City	Michigan	WFUP-DT6	45.6
Detroit	Michigan	WADL-DT7	38.7
Detroit	Michigan	WPXD-DT8	31.8
Detroit	Michigan	WXYZ-DT4	20.4
Grand Rapids	Michigan	WZPX-DT8	43.8
Sault Ste. Marie	Michigan	WWUP-DT6	10.6
La Crescent	Minnesota	KQEG-CD6	8.6
Minneapolis–Saint Paul	Minnesota	KARE-DT8	11.8
Kansas City	Missouri	K15MB-D	45.1
Kansas City	Missouri	KCWE-DT4	29.4
Kansas City	Missouri	WDAF-DT4	38.4
Springfield	Missouri	KFKY-LD5	20.5
St. Louis	Missouri	K15KP-D	15.1
St. Louis	Missouri	WRBU-DT6	46.8
Jackson	Mississippi	WAPT-DT6	16.6
Billings	Montana	KTVQ-DT6	2.6
Helena	Montana	KXLH-LD6	9.6
Charlotte	North Carolina	WCCB-DT7	18.7
Greensboro–High Point	North Carolina	WFMY-DT8	2.8
Greenville	North Carolina	W34FH-D7	18.7
Greenville	North Carolina	WDKT-LD4	31.4
Greenville	North Carolina	WEPX-DT8	38.8
Jacksonville	North Carolina	WPXU-DT8	35.8
Raleigh–Durham	North Carolina	W33EI-D	46.1
Raleigh–Durham	North Carolina	WTVD-DT4	11.4
Albuquerque	New Mexico	KLUZ-DT3	14.3
Albuquerque	New Mexico	KTFQ-DT3	41.3
Las Vegas	Nevada	KGNG-LD	26.1
Las Vegas	Nevada	KMCC-DT8	34.8
Las Vegas	Nevada	KTNV-DT4	13.4
Albany–Schenectady	New York	WYPX-DT8	55.8
Buffalo	New York	WKBW-DT5	7.5
New York City	New York	WABC-DT4	7.4
New York City	New York	WLNY-DT4	55.4
Oneida	New York	WTKO-CD2	22.2
Rochester	New York	WAWW-LD	20.1
Syracuse	New York	WTVU-CD2	22.2
Syracuse	New York	WSPX-DT8	56.8
Utica	New York	WWDG-CD2	22.2
Cincinnati	Ohio	WCPO-DT7	9.7
Cleveland	Ohio	WEWS-DT5	5.5
Columbus	Ohio	W17EB-D	44.1
Columbus	Ohio	WCSN-LD7	32.7
Oklahoma City	Oklahoma	KOPX-DT8	62.8
Oklahoma City	Oklahoma	KTUZ-DT3	30.3
Tulsa	Oklahoma	K30OK-D	10.1
Tulsa	Oklahoma	KTPX-DT8	44.8
Portland	Oregon	KPXG-DT8	22.8
Lancaster–Harrisburg	Pennsylvania	WGAL-DT7	8.7
Philadelphia	Pennsylvania	WPPX-DT8	61.8
Pittsburgh	Pennsylvania	WINP-DT8	16.8
Pittsburgh	Pennsylvania	WPKD-DT5	19.5
Scranton–Wilkes-Barre	Pennsylvania	WQPX-DT8	64.8
Providence	Rhode Island	WPXQ-DT6	69.6
Columbia	South Carolina	WOLO-DT8	25.8
Greenville–Spartanburg	South Carolina	WYFF-DT5	4.5
Knoxville	Tennessee	WPXK-DT8	54.8
Knoxville	Tennessee	W30EG-D	30.1
Memphis	Tennessee	WPXX-DT7	50.7
Nashville	Tennessee	WJDE-CD13	31.13
Nashville	Tennessee	WNPX-DT8	28.8
Amarillo	Texas	KXAD-LD	51.1
Beaumont	Texas	KUIL-LD14	12.14
Bryan	Texas	KRHD-CD5	40.5
Corpus Christi	Texas	KRIS-DT7	6.7
Corsicana	Texas	K07AAF-D	9.1
Dallas–Fort Worth	Texas	KPXD-DT8	68.8
Dallas–Fort Worth	Texas	KTXA-DT5	21.5
Houston	Texas	KFTH-DT3	20.3
San Antonio	Texas	KWEX-DT4	41.4
San Antonio	Texas	KPXL-DT8	26.8
Victoria	Texas	KXTS-LD3	41.3
Salt Lake City	Utah	KSTU-DT6	13.6
Salt Lake City	Utah	KUPX-DT8	16.8
Norfolk	Virginia	WTKR-DT4	3.4
Norfolk	Virginia	WPXV-DT8	49.8
Portsmouth	Virginia	W26EV-D	14.1
Richmond	Virginia	WTVR-DT7	6.7
Roanoke	Virginia	W32EW-D	32.1
Roanoke	Virginia	WPXR-DT8	38.8
Kennewick	Washington	KVEW-DT7	42.7
Seattle–Tacoma	Washington	KSTW-DT6	11.6
Spokane	Washington	K29NM-D	29.1
Spokane	Washington	KXLY-DT7	4.7
Spokane	Washington	KXMN-LD7	4.7
Yakima	Washington	KAPP-DT7	35.7
Charleston–Huntington	West Virginia	W26EW-D	26.1
Charleston–Huntington	West Virginia	WLPX-DT8	29.8
Elk Mound	Wisconsin	WBDL-LD6	8.6
Green Bay	Wisconsin	WGBA-DT5	26.5
La Crosse	Wisconsin	WKBT-DT6	8.6
Madison	Wisconsin	WISC-DT5	3.5
Milwaukee	Wisconsin	WITI-DT3	6.3
Sturgeon Bay	Wisconsin	WLWK-CD5	26.5
Tomah	Wisconsin	WPDR-LD6	8.6
Wausau	Wisconsin	W27AU-D4	12.4
Wausau	Wisconsin	WJFW-DT4	12.4
Wausau	Wisconsin	WTPX-DT8	46.8

== See also ==
- USA Broadcasting
