= WOSC-CD =

Television station in Pittsburgh

WOSC-CD and WIIC-LD
Pittsburgh, Pennsylvania; United States
- Channels for WOSC-CD: Digital: 26 (UHF); Virtual: 61
- Channels for WIIC-LD: Digital: 10 (VHF), applied for 13 (VHF); Virtual: 31

Programming
- Affiliations: see § Subchannels

Ownership
- Owner: The Videohouse, Inc.

History
- Founded: WOSC-CD: July 2, 1987; WIIC-LD: August 23, 1989
- First air date: WOSC-CD: July 9, 1997; WIIC-LD: December 30, 1998
- Former call signs: WOSC-CD: JB0702NQ (1987–1992); W61CC (1992–2012); WOSC-LP (2012–2014)
- Former channel number: WOSC-CD: Analog: 61 (UHF, 1997–2011)
- Former affiliations: WOSC-CD: ValueVision (via W63AU, 1997–1999); Silent (1999, 2023–2024); America's Store (1999–2004); HSN (2004–2022); Catchy Comedy (2022–2023); Rewind TV (2024)

Technical information
- Licensing authority: FCC
- Facility ID: WOSC-CD: 68411; WIIC-LD: 66636
- Class: WOSC-CD: CD; WIIC-LD: LD
- ERP: WOSC-CD: 30 kW; WIIC-LD: 3 kW 0.425 kW (application)
- HAAT: WOSC-CD: 179.3 m (588 ft); WIIC-LD: 245.8 m (806 ft) 179.3 m (588 ft) (application)
- Transmitter coordinates: WOSC-CD: 40°26′46.2″N 79°57′50.2″W; WIIC-LD: 40°26′23.8″N 79°43′8.3″W 40°26′46.2″N 79°57′50.2″W (application)

Links
- Public license information: WOSC-CD: Public file; LMS; WIIC-LD: Public file; LMS

WOSC-CD (channel 61) is a low-power, Class A television station in Pittsburgh, Pennsylvania, United States. Owned by The Videohouse, Inc., it primarily broadcasts national digital multicast networks.

The station went on the air as W61CC in 1997. By 1999, it was airing the America's Store home shopping service. The station switched to airing HSN in 2004 when America's Store moved to WQEX (channel 16).

== Local programming ==
As of the first quarter of 2020, WOSC-CD cut away from national programming for five hours each week, primarily on Sunday, to meet its local programming requirements as a Class A station. Most of their local programming was Saint Simon & Jude Parish services, which aired from 7:30 to 8:30 a.m. WOSC also aired Cappelli & Company from 8:30 to 9:30 a.m. Saint Simon & Jude Parish would then continue from 9:30 a.m. to 12:30 p.m.

On July 12, 2022, WOSC-CD added an over-the-air broadcast variant of One America News Network known as OAN Plus to its list of digital subchannels.

== Subchannels ==
The station's signal is multiplexed:

Subchannels of WOSC-CD
Subchannel	Res.	Short name	Programming
61.1	480i	WOSC-CD	MeTV Toons
61.2	480i	MOVISPH	MovieSphere Gold (WPTG-CD)
61.3	480i	BUZZR	Buzzr
61.4	480i	SBN	SonLife
61.5	480i	AWEPLUS	WEST
61.6	480i	QVC	QVC
61.7	480i	NEWSMX2	Newsmax2
61.8	480i	OAN	One America Plus
61.9	480i	AMVOICE	Real America's Voice
61.10	480i	OSN	One Source Network
61.11	480i	QVC2	QVC2
61.12	480i	HSN2	HSN2

Simulcast of subchannels of another station
