= WNYX-LD (1980–2023) =

Television station in New York City (1980–2023)

- New York, New York; United States
- Channels: Digital: 5 (VHF); Virtual: 32

Programming
- Affiliations: Independent (1980–1987, 1994–2006, November 2007–2009; via WLNY-TV, 1987–1994); Nuestra TV (2006–June 2007); Religious, Infomercials (2010–2013); CCTV News (2016–2017); CGTN America (2017–2021); Diya TV (2021–2023)

Ownership
- Owner: New York Spectrum Holding Company, LLC
- Operator: CMMB America
- Sister stations: WNXY-LD, WXNY-LD

History
- Founded: September 16, 1980
- First air date: December 19, 1980
- Last air date: December 1, 2023 (license canceled)
- Former call signs: W59AT (1980–1987); W44AI (1987–1994); WNYX-LP (1994–2010)
- Former channel number: Analog: 59 (UHF, 1980–1987), 44 (UHF, 1987–1997), 35 (UHF, 1997–2010)

Technical information
- Licensing authority: FCC
- Facility ID: 29236
- Class: LD
- ERP: 0.25 kW
- HAAT: 300 m (984 ft)
- Transmitter coordinates: 40°44′54″N 73°59′9″W

Links
- Public license information: LMS

WNYX-LD (channel 32) was a low-power television station in New York City. The station was owned by the New York Spectrum Holding Company and operated by CMMB America. There was one subchannel on the multiplex, Diya TV.

== History ==
=== As W59AT and W44AI ===
Originally, this station began operations on channel 59 as W59AT, licensed to Plainview, becoming the third TV station in Long Island and the second independent station since WSNL (channel 67) first went on the air seven years earlier. In the early years, the station was the first in broadcasting an all-music video format from Satellite Program Network as secondary from 5 a.m. to 2 a.m. In addition to music videos, the station also aired instructional programming from local colleges and ethnic and community programming. For a time, it was a translator for WLIG (channel 55; now WLNY-TV).

In 1987, it moved to channel 44 and changed its city of license to Hicksville, accordingly changing its call letters to W44AI. During this time, it broadcast a mix of public access-type programs and shows from independent producers, which included the only regularly scheduled show for the region's LGBTQ+ community. In 1994, it changed its call sign to WNYX-LP (having already used WNYX as its name), and in 1997 it moved to channel 35 in New York City.

=== As WNYX-LP ===
Throughout the 1990s and 2000s, WNYX-LP aired community programming, some of which was produced by local businesses and public-access television studios. Like its sister station WNXY-LD, the station broadcast community public-access television-type programming. Other programming that was produced in the early 1990s included psychic tarot readings. In 2004, WNYX-LP produced an hour-long program called The New Yorkers, hosted by James Chladek. A movie review program hosted by Stu Lee was broadcast, and music videos were reintroduced after seven years.

In 2005, WNYX-LP began to air Almavision from 9 a.m. to 9 p.m., with community programing airing weeknights and weekends. In 2006, Nuestra TV was carried full-time. A year later, WNYX-LP went back to independent status. Metro Studios moved from East 23rd Street to its new location on West 42nd Street in Times Square in 2007. As a result, WNYX-LP ceased operations temporarily from June to late November of that year.

WNYX-LP returned to the air two days before Thanksgiving, with a new branding of "TV 35 New York" Some of its programming was replaced by The New Yorkers, which aired during the day. During the evenings, old classic movies aired along with psychic readings. On weekends, only religious programming aired in the mornings.

In 2009, around the same time Pulse 87 audio programming was being aired over co-owned WNYZ-LP, the entire programming lineup was dropped in favor of another format called The Jared Whitham Channel featuring Jared Whitham, a bespectacled local area comic/musician. WNYX-LP temporarily signed off in October 2009, along with co-owned WNXY and WXNY, in order to build out digital transmitting facilities. WNYX-LP was most recently licensed to New York, and was available online, but has since been shut down.

=== As WNYX-LD ===
As WNYX-LD, the station returned to the air in November 2010 with a new format airing both paid programming and religious programming under a temporary LMA with Jacobs Broadcasting. Soon after, the station rebranded itself simply as WNYX. WNYX-LD simulcasted the programming on co-owned WNXY-LD and WXNY-LD. Programming consisted of silent black-and-white movies featuring Charlie Chaplin and Buster Keaton. WNYX-LD was owned by Island Broadcasting Company. However, due a fraud investigation which the founder was found guilty in 2013, the station went offline and displayed SMPTE Color Bars.

Island Broadcasting sold the following stations to NY Spectrum Holdings in 2012. Early that year in 2012, WNYX-LD became a full-time CCTV news affiliate. As of September 2013, WNYX-LD was off the air, with the CCTV co-affiliation going to sister station WNXY Channel 43. In 2016, WNYX-LD returned on the air simulcasting CCTV News branding 32.1.

The following year, CCTV News was renamed to CGTN America though it continued with the all-news format. WNYX-LD appeared in September 2018 on channel 35.513 blank; it was not known what format they would be airing though it had subsequently applied its construction permit to move to channel 5, a frequency previously used by WNYW.

In mid 2021, after eight years as a news affiliate of CGTN America, the station switched to its new affiliate Diya TV, a U.S. based network simulcasting WNXY-LD. This new transition marks the first time since WDVB-CD added this South Asian format in early 2010. WNXY-LD carried the network alongside WNYX, a reversal from nearly 15 years ago when WNXY simulcast WNYX as an independent station.

The Federal Communications Commission canceled the licenses for WNYX-LD and WNXY-LD effective December 1, 2023, due to the stations having been dark since at least July 18, 2022, and concerns about the stations' facilities not being constructed as permitted.

== Subchannel ==
Subchannel of WNYX-LD and WNXY-LD
| Channel | | Res. | Short name | | Programming |
| WNYX-LD | WNXY-LD | Res. | WNYX-LD | WNXY-LD | Programming |
|---|---|---|---|---|---|
| 32.1 | 43.1 | 480i | Diya TV | WNXY | Diya TV (4:3) |
