= KAAP-LD =

Television station in San Jose–Santa Clara, California

- San Jose–Santa Clara, California; United States
- Channels: Digital: 24 (UHF); Virtual: 24

Programming
- Affiliations: 24.1: Diya TV; for others, see § Subchannels

Ownership
- Owner: DiyaTV, Inc.
- Operator: Major Market Broadcasting

History
- Founded: February 20, 2009
- Former call signs: KOTR-LD (until 2018)
- Former channel numbers: Digital: 41 (UHF, 2009–2010), 11 (VHF, 2010–?)
- Former affiliations: MyNetworkTV (as a translator of KOTR-LP)

Technical information
- Licensing authority: FCC
- Facility ID: 167425
- Class: LD
- ERP: 0.55 kW
- HAAT: 543.4 m (1,783 ft)
- Transmitter coordinates: 37°29′17″N 121°52′3″W

Links
- Public license information: LMS
- Website: www.diyatvusa.com

KAAP-LD (channel 24) is a low-power television station licensed to both San Jose and Santa Clara, California, United States, serving as the flagship station of the Asian-American oriented network Diya TV. The station's offices are located on Walsh Avenue in Santa Clara, with its transmitter on Monument Peak.

== History ==
A construction permit was filed on February 20, 2009, by Mirage Media for KOTR-LD, a digital translator of Monterey's MyNetworkTV affiliate KOTR-LP (channel 2) on channel 41. On August 10, 2010, Mirage Media filed to change the channel allocation to channel 11 to avoid interference with San Jose-based KKPX-TV. On March 15, 2018, the station was acquired by Diya TV, Inc. and changed its call sign to KAAP-LD. It began airing the Diya TV network on June 1. Later in 2018, VietBay programming was added to its second digital subchannel, and on January 1, 2019, NewsNet was added to a third subchannel.

Because of the digital television repack, KAAP-LD's owner applied to the Federal Communications Commission (FCC) to move its digital broadcast channel to 24, its city of license to San Jose–Santa Clara, California, and its transmitter site to Monument Peak to serve the San Francisco Bay Area.

== Subchannels ==
The station's signal is multiplexed:

Subchannels of KAAP-LD
Channel	Res.	Short name	Programming
24.1	480i	Diya TV	Diya TV
24.3	480i	Antenna	Antenna TV (4:3)
24.6	480i	VBS	[Blank] (4:3)
24.7	480i	OANPlus	One America Plus
24.8	480i	AWEPlus	AWE Plus
24.10	480i	JTV	Jewelry TV
24.11	480i	QVC	QVC (4:3)
24.12	480i	QVC2	QVC2 (4:3)
30.1	480i	KMMC-LD	Estrella TV (KMMC-LD)
30.2	480i	Novlsma	Más Show (KMMC-LD)

Simulcast of subchannels of another station

== See also ==
- Channel 11 low-power TV stations in the United States
