= Channel 43 digital TV stations in the United States =

The following television stations broadcast on digital channel 43 in the United States:

- K43HD-D in Quanah, Texas, to move to channel 35
- K43JQ-D in Bismarck, North Dakota, to move to channel 23
- K43MH-D in Vesta, Minnesota, to move to channel 34, on virtual channel 50

The following stations, which are no longer licensed, formerly broadcast on digital channel 43 in the U.S.:

- K43AG-D in Edwards, California
- K43ED-D in New Mobeetie, Texas
- K43EG-D in Pitkin, Colorado
- K43LV-D in Chalfant Valley, California
- K43NU-D in Follett, Texas
- K43NZ-D in Port Orford, Oregon
- KBMT-LD in Beaumont, Texas
- KYHT-LD in Lake Charles, Louisiana
- W43DL-D in Montgomery, Alabama
- WADA-LD in Wilmington, North Carolina
- WBTD-LD in Suffolk, Virginia
- WLEP-LD in Erie, Pennsylvania
- WPBO in Portsmouth, Ohio
