= KOTR-LD =

Television station in Monterey, California

- Monterey, California; United States
- Channels: Digital: 7 (VHF); Virtual: 7
- Branding: My 11

Programming
- Affiliations: 7.1: Independent with MyNetworkTV; for others, see § Subchannels

Ownership
- Owner: Mirage Media 2, LLC; (William J. Jaeger)

History
- First air date: December 6, 2006 (on Comcast cable); April 9, 2007 (over-the-air)
- Former call signs: K07ZK (until 2005); KOTR-LP (2005–2018)
- Former channel numbers: Analog: 2 (VHF, until 2018); Virtual: 11 (until 2021)
- Former affiliations: Independent; NBC (as a translator of KSBW, until 2006); Dark (2006−2007)
- Call sign meaning: The Otter (former branding)

Technical information
- Licensing authority: FCC
- Facility ID: 187515
- ERP: 0.7 kW
- HAAT: 647.9 m (2,126 ft)
- Transmitter coordinates: 36°32′13″N 121°37′36.9″W

Links
- Public license information: LMS

KOTR-LD (channel 7) is a low-power television station licensed to Monterey, California, United States, serving the Monterey Bay area. It is programmed primarily as an independent station, but maintains a secondary affiliation with MyNetworkTV. Owned by Mirage Media 2, LLC, KOTR-LD maintains studios on Garden Road south of Monterey Regional Airport in Monterey; its transmitter is located on Mount Toro, 10 miles (16 km) south of Salinas.

== History ==
Mirage Media acquired the broadcast license of K02DC, a translator of Monterey's NBC affiliate KSBW (channel 8) licensed to serve the Sycamore Flat area near Greenfield, California, from the Arroyo Seco Citizens Association. Shortly after the sale, the company applied to the Federal Communications Commission (FCC) to move the transmitter site to serve Gonzales and increase the effective radiated power from 44 watts to 3000 watts. On May 23, 2006, the station went silent pending construction of the new broadcast facilities.

On June 15, 2006, it was announced that KOTR-LP would become the MyNetworkTV affiliate for the Monterey–Salinas–Santa Cruz market.

On December 6, 2006, KOTR-LP began operation as cable channel 11 on Monterey County's Comcast system. The station launched over-the-air on April 9, 2007.

On March 6, 2018, it was reported that KOTR-LP's license in Santa Cruz was being sold to South Asian broadcaster Diya TV for $50,000. The station's programming and intellectual property would move to another station owned by Mirage Media.

== News operation ==
Until 2012, the station simulcast newscasts from KRON-TV in San Francisco. Newscasts aired weekdays from 6 to 9 a.m., and at 5, 6 and 11 p.m., and weekends at 8 p.m. Paid programming has since replaced the newscasts.

== Subchannels ==
The station's digital signal is multiplexed:

Subchannels of KOTR-LD
Channel	Res.	Short name	Programming
7.1	480i	My Net	Main KOTR-LD programming
7.2	480i	NOW 7-2	News of the World
7.3	480i	SHOPLC	Shop LC (4:3)

== See also ==
- Channel 7 digital TV stations in the United States
- Channel 11 branded TV stations in the United States
