= WRJK-LD =

Television station in Arlington Heights, Illinois

- Arlington Heights–Chicago, Illinois; United States
- City: Arlington Heights, Illinois
- Channels: Digital: 36 (UHF); Virtual: 22
- Branding: Chicago 22

Programming
- Affiliations: 22.1: Diya TV; for others, see § Subchannels

Ownership
- Owner: Major Market Broadcasting; (Chicago 22, LLC)

History
- Founded: May 27, 1989
- Former call signs: W22AJ (1987–2001); W64CQ (2001–2013); WRJK-LP (2013–2022)
- Former channel numbers: Analog: 22 (UHF, 1989–2022)

Technical information
- Licensing authority: FCC
- Facility ID: 68061
- Class: LD
- ERP: 5.1 kW
- HAAT: 392.1 m (1,286 ft)
- Transmitter coordinates: 41°53′56.1″N 87°37′23.2″W

Links
- Public license information: LMS

WRJK-LD (channel 22) is a low-power television station licensed to Arlington Heights, Illinois, United States, serving the Chicago area as an affiliate of Diya TV. Owned by Major Market Broadcasting, the station maintains a transmitter atop the John Hancock Center.

== Subchannels ==
The station's signal is multiplexed:

Subchannels of WRJK-LD
Subchannel	Res.	Short name	Programming
22.1	480i	DiyaTV	Diya TV
22.4	480i	Heartld	Heartland
22.5	480i	Retro	Retro TV (4:3)
22.6	480i	AWEPlus	AWE Plus (4:3)
22.7	480i	OANPlus	One America Plus (4:3)
22.8	480i	WISHnet	WISH-TV newscasts
22.9	480i	FNX	First Nations Experience (4:3)
22.10	480i	TCT	TCT (4:3)
22.11	480i	HSN	HSN (4:3)
22.12	480i	QVC	QVC (4:3)
