= KWOG =

Television station in Springdale, Arkansas

- Springdale–Fayetteville–; Fort Smith, Arkansas; United States
- City: Springdale, Arkansas
- Channels: Digital: 29 (UHF); Virtual: 57

Programming
- Affiliations: 57.1: Daystar; for others, see § Subchannels

Ownership
- Owner: Daystar Television Network; (Word of God Fellowship, Inc.)

History
- First air date: December 11, 1995
- Former call signs: KSBN-TV (1995–2007)
- Former channel numbers: Analog: 57 (UHF, 1997–2007); Digital: 39 (UHF, 2007–2018)
- Former affiliations: SafeTV (1995–2007)
- Call sign meaning: Word of God Fellowship (Daystar's owner)

Technical information
- Licensing authority: FCC
- Facility ID: 67347
- ERP: 36 kW
- HAAT: 114 m (374 ft)
- Transmitter coordinates: 36°11′4.6″N 94°17′50″W

Links
- Public license information: Public file; LMS
- Website: www.daystar.com

KWOG (channel 57) is a religious television station licensed to Springdale, Arkansas, United States, serving Northwest Arkansas. The station is owned by the Daystar Television Network. KWOG's transmitter is located west of Springdale.

== History ==
Prior to March 2, 2007, the station aired SafeTV with the callsign KSBN-TV, owned by Total Life Community Educational Foundation.

== Subchannels ==
The station's signal is multiplexed:

Subchannels of KWOG
Channel	Res.	Short name	Programming
57.1	1080i	KWOG-HD	Daystar
57.2	720p	KWOG-ES	Daystar Español
57.3	480p	KWOG-WD	Daystar Reflections
