= Channel 43 low-power TV stations in the United States =

The following low-power television stations broadcast on digital or analog channel 43 in the United States:

- K43HD-D in Quanah, Texas, to move to channel 35
- K43JQ-D in Bismarck, North Dakota, to move to channel 23
- K43MH-D in Vesta, Minnesota, to move to channel 34

The following stations, which are no longer licensed, formerly broadcast on digital or analog channel 43:

- K43AE in Myton, etc., Utah
- K43AF in Ukiah, California
- K43AG-D in Edwards, California
- K43AK in English Bay, Alaska
- K43DA in Eureka, Utah
- K43ED-D in New Mobeetie, Texas
- K43EG-D in Pitkin, Colorado
- K43EV in Emery, Utah
- K43GN in Delta/Oak City, etc., Utah
- K43GY in Yakima, etc., Washington
- K43IJ in Wayne County (Rural), Utah
- K43LV-D in Chalfant Valley, California
- K43NU-D in Follett, Texas
- K43NZ-D in Port Orford, Oregon
- KBMT-LD in Beaumont, Texas
- KCHD-CA in Cheyenne, Wyoming
- KDUO-LP in Palm Desert, California
- KELM-LP in Reno, Nevada
- KRPG-LP in Des Moines, Iowa
- KYHT-LD in Lake Charles, Louisiana
- W43BO in Marion, etc., Virginia
- W43DL-D in Montgomery, Alabama
- WADA-LD in Wilmington, North Carolina
- WAJN-LP in Brookston, Indiana
- WBTD-LD in Suffolk, Virginia
- WBXT-CA in Tallahassee, Florida
- WKAG-CA in Hopkinsville, Kentucky
- WLEP-LD in Erie, Pennsylvania
