= WPTG-CD =

Television station in Pittsburgh

- Pittsburgh, Pennsylvania; United States
- Channels: Digital: 30 (UHF); Virtual: 69

Programming
- Affiliations: see § Subchannels

Ownership
- Owner: Fifth Street Enterprises, LLC

History
- Founded: October 31, 1988
- First air date: August 28, 1997
- Former call signs: W69CC (1988–2002); WPTG-LP (2002–2013); WPTG-LD (2013–2014)
- Former channel numbers: Analog: 69 (UHF, 1988–2013); Digital: 49 (UHF, 2013–2020)
- Former affiliations: As a W35AZ/WONT-LP translator: Network One (August–November 1997); ACN (November 1997–2001); Shop at Home (2001–2002); As a standalone station: Bounce TV (2016–2018); This TV (2018–2024); Rewind TV (2024–2025, now on 69.9)
- Call sign meaning: Pittsburgh

Technical information
- Licensing authority: FCC
- Facility ID: 272
- Class: CD
- ERP: 30 kW
- HAAT: 179.3 m (588 ft)
- Transmitter coordinates: 40°26′46.2″N 79°57′50.2″W
- Translator(s): WOSC-CD 61.2 Pittsburgh

Links
- Public license information: Public file; LMS

WPTG-CD (channel 69) is a low-power television station in Pittsburgh, Pennsylvania, United States. The station is owned by Fifth Street Enterprises, LLC. WPTG-CD's transmitter is located in Pittsburgh's Oakland neighborhood.

== History ==
The station's construction permit was issued on October 31, 1988, under the calls of W69CC. On February 6, 2002, it was changed to WPTG-LP. On December 23, 2013, it was changed to WPTG-LD. The current callsign of WPTG-CD was assigned on April 25, 2014.

WPTG-CD was owned by Abacus Television until it was sold, along with four other TV stations, to Fifth Street Enterprises in April 2015.

== Subchannels ==
The station's signal is multiplexed:

Subchannels of WPTG-CD
Subchannel	Res.	Short name	Programming
69.1	480i	WPTG-CD	MovieSphere Gold
69.2	480i	NTD	NTD America
69.3	480i	RETRO	Retro TV
69.4	480i	FTFSPTS	FTF Sports
69.5	480i	TRUCRME	True Crime Network
69.6	480i	HEARTLD	Heartland
69.7	480i	DIYATV	AWE Plus
69.8	480i		Mariavision
69.9	480i	DOCTOR	Rewind TV
69.10	480i	CANELLA	OnTV4U
69.11	480i	SHOPLC	Shop LC
69.12	480i	JTV	Jewelry TV
