= Diya TV =

American broadcast television network

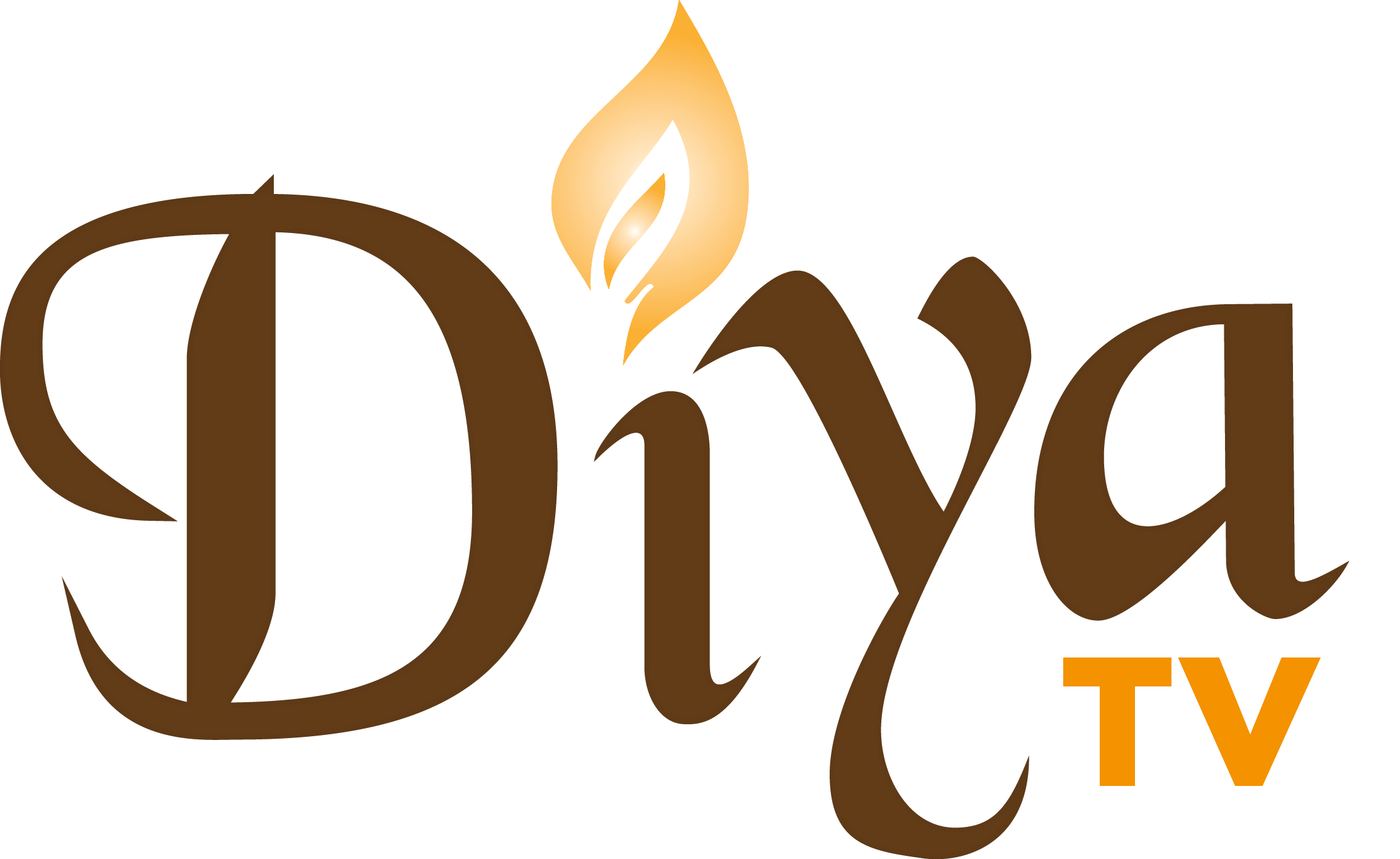
- Type: Broadcast television network
- Country: United States
- Availability: Nationwide (available on OTA digital television, Cable TV and LPTV (covering 27.85% of U.S. households);
- Founded: 2009; 17 years ago
- Headquarters: San Francisco, California, U.S.
- Key people: Ravi Kapur (founder)
- Launch date: 2009
- Affiliates: List of affiliates
- Official website: www.diyatvusa.com

Diya TV is an American broadcast television network that was founded in 2009 by Ravi Kapur, a journalist, and is based in San Francisco, California. It is the widest distributed Asian American owned and themed television network in the United States, reaching in excess of 85 million people over the air.

Diya TV provides programming geared toward Indian American and South Asian interests in the United States, with programming rooted in news and investigative journalism in English, Hindi and Punjabi.

Kapur was the former owner of KAXT-CD in San Francisco, which was formerly affiliated with Diya TV. Diya TV is referred to as "America’s first and only South Asian broadcast television network".

== List of affiliates ==
- KFLA-LD - Los Angeles, California
- WACP - Philadelphia, Pennsylvania
- KLEG-CD - Dallas, Texas
- KMMC-LD - San Francisco, California
- KAAP-LD - San Jose, California
- KQAH-LD - Seattle, Washington
- WPTG-CD - Pittsburgh, Pennsylvania
- WLVO-LD - Atlanta, Georgia
- WWMW-LD - Milwaukee, Wisconsin
- KGHD-LD - Las Vegas, Nevada
- KTAS - San Luis Obispo–Santa Barbara–Santa Maria, California
- KPDY-LD - Santa Barbara, California
- WDVW-LD - Jacksonville, Florida
- WTXI-LD - Miami–Fort Lauderdale-Key West, Florida
- WSWF-LD - Orlando, Florida
- WTBT-LD - Tampa, Florida
- WVWW-LD - Vero Beach, Florida
- WBWP-LD - West Palm Beach, Florida
- WISH-TV - Indianapolis, Indiana
- WUBX-CD - Durham, North Carolina
- WDYA-LD - New York, New York
- KBBV-CD - Bakersfield, California
- WXOH-LD - Columbus, Ohio
- WRJK-LD - Arlington Heights, Illinois
- WWAT-CD - Charleroi, Pennsylvania
- WMWI-LD - Verona, Wisconsin

=== Former affiliates ===
- WNYX/WXNY - New York, New York
- KFLA-LD - Los Angeles, California
- KAXT-CD - San Francisco, California
- KQHO-LD - Houston, Texas
- WHNE-LD - Detroit, Michigan
- WRNT-LD - Hartford, Connecticut
- WCRN-LD - Providence, Rhode Island
- KBID-LD - Fresno, California
