= WSWF-LD =

Television station in Orlando, Florida

- Orlando, Florida; United States
- Channels: Digital: 29 (UHF); Virtual: 10

Programming
- Affiliations: 10.1: Diya TV; for others, see § Subchannels

Ownership
- Owner: Major Market Broadcasting; (Major Market Broadcasting of Florida, Inc.)

History
- Founded: March 1989
- Former call signs: W19AX (1989–1997); W13CU (1997–2000); WSWF-LP (2000–2009)
- Former channel numbers: Analog: 19 (UHF, 1989–2002), 13 (VHF, 2002–2009); Digital: 10 (VHF, 2009–2015), 45 (UHF, 2015–2020)

Technical information
- Licensing authority: FCC
- Facility ID: 61703
- Class: LD
- ERP: 15 kW
- HAAT: 107.7 m (353 ft)
- Transmitter coordinates: 28°34′7.8″N 81°13′53.8″W

Links
- Public license information: LMS

WSWF-LD (channel 10) is a low-power television station in Orlando, Florida, United States, affiliated with Diya TV. The station is owned by Major Market Broadcasting.

== History ==
Originally licensed to Kissimmee, the station began broadcasting as W19AX in March 1989. It branded as "WTTC", "The Tourist Channel", and offered a format of information on weather and attractions for visitors to the area. The Tourist Channel made $85,000 a month in advertising from local attractions. The owner, the Specialty Broadcasting Corporation, was snarled by lawsuits from partners in The Tourist Channel; facing rising legal fees, it filed for bankruptcy protection in December 1990 in order to liquidate.

After the lawsuits, the owners of Specialty, the Namey brothers, revived the permit as a station offering community programming and old movies in 1992. The Nameys had started a similar business, Visitel Network, to offer programs like those aired on the Tourist Channel, which later was broadcast on W27BB.

In 1997, the station moved to channel 13 as W13CU. On June 6, 2000, it was reassigned the call sign WSWF-LP. On November 17, 2009, it moved to the current call sign WSWF-LD.

== Subchannels ==
The station's digital signal is multiplexed:

Subchannels of WSWF-LD
Subchannel	Res.	Short name	Programming
10.1	480i	DiyaTV	Diya TV
10.2	480i	Orange	Local (PEG)
10.3	480i	Vision	Local (PEG)
10.4	480i	Nvlsma	[Blank]
10.6	480i	Antenna	Antenna TV
10.8	480i	OANPlus	One America Plus
10.9	480i	AWEPlus	AWE Plus
10.10	480i	JTV	[Blank]
10.11	480i	HSN	HSN
10.12	480i	QVC	QVC
