= Almavision =

American Spanish-language Christian TV network

- Type: Broadcast television network
- Country: United States
- Headquarters: 3189 Airway Ave Suite E, Costa Mesa, CA 92626

Ownership
- Owner: Almavision Hispanic Network
- Key people: Daniel Caamaño

History
- Launched: 2002
- Former names: VidaVision

Links
- Website: http://www.almavision.com/

Almavision is an American television network broadcasting Christian programming in Spanish with affiliates across North and Central America. The network is carried via satellite on Echostar and SatMex 5, their slogan is "Televisión Cristiana...a la manera de Dios. " ("Christian television... in God's way.") and "Comprometidos con la verdad" ("committed to the truth").

== History ==
Almavision Television began broadcasting on December 28, 2002, as VidaVision on channel 25 in Los Angeles, California. In early 2003, they learned that there was another group in Florida using that name so they changed their name to Almavision (meaning "Soul Vision").

The network was founded by Juan "Bruno" Caamaño. According to Caamaño, "I was praying and meditating on the Word of God when I received an instruction from the Lord to establish a television ministry".

== Affiliates ==
- KTAV-LD 35.1 Altadena/Los Angeles, California
- W31EZ-D 25.1 Arbury Hills, Illinois
- KHPK-LD 28.3 DeSoto, Texas
- KJJM-LD 34.3 Dallas/Fort Worth, Texas
- KUVM-LD 10.3 Missouri City/Houston, Texas
- KKPM-CD 28.10 Chico/Sacramento, California
- KTVP-LD 22.5 Phoenix, Arizona
- WEYS-LD 31.1 Miami/Fort Lauderdale, Florida
- KISA-LD 40.3 San Antonio, Texas
- KEGS-LD 30.2 Las Vegas, Nevada
- KWYT-LD 36.5 Yakima, Washington
