= Channel 23 =

Channel 23 or TV23 may refer to several television stations:

- TV23 (Cobb County), a cable-only government-access television channel in Cobb County, Georgia, USA
- Israeli Educational Television, a state-owned public television network in Israel
- Studio 23, a former television network in the Philippines
- DWBA-DTV, the flagship television station of the Aliw Channel 23 in Metro Manila, Philippines
- DWAC-TV, Defunct flagship television station of Studio 23/ABS-CBN Sports+Action channel 23 in Metro Manila, Philippines
- CN23, a defunct Argentine news channel
- TV23, a news channel in Switzerland owned by Swiss Telegraphic Agency

== Canada ==
The following television stations operate on virtual channel 23 in Canada:

- CIVP-DT in Chapeau, Quebec

== See also ==
- Channel 23 virtual TV stations in the United States

For UHF frequencies covering 524-530 MHz:

- Channel 23 TV stations in Canada
- Channel 23 TV stations in Mexico
- Channel 23 digital TV stations in the United States
- Channel 23 low-power TV stations in the United States
