= KFLL =

KFLL may refer to:

- KFLL-LD, a low-power television station (channel 25) licensed to serve Boise, Idaho, United States
- Fort Lauderdale–Hollywood International Airport (ICAO code KFLL)
