= La Coacha =

- Born: 1982 (age 42–43); Tijuana, Baja California, Mexico
- Known for: celebrity interviews, music parodies
- Website: www.chismetime.com

La Coacha is a Mexican–American comedian, singer, blogger and internet personality. She became Perez Hilton's protégé after 'stalking' him for a number of years. Her videos are often featured on his website. La Coacha's internet videos are popular, with her parody of Lady Gaga's Alejandro totaling over three million views. Her parody of Katy Perry's California Gurls titled Kardashian Gurls, was her first parody available for purchase on iTunes. Perez Hilton raps in both the song and the video. Kim Kardashian, Khloé Kardashian and Katy Perry all admitted to loving the video.

La Coacha has been featured on TMZ, E! News, On Air with Ryan Seacrest, NBC's Last Comic Standing, Comedy Central, The Spirit Awards, MTV Tr3s and LATV. She is well known for her use of Chicano English in her work, as well as her bubbly and sometimes deliberately obnoxious personality.

On September 29, 2010 La Coacha became the first Mexican celebrity to get her own milkshake at Millions of Milkshakes in West Hollywood.
