= KGBS =

KGBS may refer to:

- KGBS-CD, a television station (channel 19) licensed to serve Austin, Texas, United States
- KENS, a television station (virtual channel 5) licensed to serve San Antonio, Texas, United States, which held the call letters KGBS-TV from February 1954 to November 1954
- KFXR (AM), a radio station (1190 AM) licensed to serve Dallas, Texas, United States, which held the call letters KGBS from 1992 to 1995
- KNX-FM, a radio station (97.1 FM) licensed to serve Los Angeles, California, United States, which held the call letters KGBS from 1966 to 1978
- KKYX, a radio station (97.1 FM) licensed to serve San Antonio, Texas, United States, which held the call letters KGBS from 1954 to 1962
- KTNQ, a radio station (97.1 FM) licensed to serve Los Angeles, California, United States, which held the call letters KGBS from 1962 to 1976
