= WFWG =

WFWG may refer to:

- WFWG-LD, a low-power television station (channel 30) licensed to serve Richmond, Virginia, United States
- Windows 3.1x#Windows for Workgroups
