= KTOU-LD =

Television station in Oklahoma City

- Oklahoma City, Oklahoma; United States
- Channels: Digital: 22 (UHF); Virtual: 22

Programming
- Affiliations: see § Subchannels

Ownership
- Owner: Innovate Corp.; (HC2 LPTV Holdings, Inc.)
- Sister stations: KBZC-LD, KOHC-CD

History
- Founded: September 16, 1993
- Former call signs: K22EM (1993–1997); KTOU-LP (1997–2011)
- Former affiliations: Hispanic Television Network; American Independent Network; Azteca América; The Country Network; Visión Latina

Technical information
- Licensing authority: FCC
- Facility ID: 28186
- Class: LD
- ERP: 15 kW
- HAAT: 144.4 m (474 ft)
- Transmitter coordinates: 35°23′14″N 97°29′57″W

Links
- Public license information: LMS

KTOU-LD (channel 22) is a low-power television station in Oklahoma City, Oklahoma, United States. The station is owned by Innovate Corp.

== History ==
The station began broadcasting in 1994 from a tower in Newcastle, Oklahoma. It aired family television programming from the American Independent Network. In 1999, it converted to a Spanish-language program format; plans were delayed when the original Newcastle tower was destroyed in a tornado that May. The Hispanic Television Network acquired the station in 2000.

In June 2013, KTOU-LD was slated to be sold to Landover 5 as part of a larger deal involving 51 other low-power television stations; the sale fell through in June 2016. Mako Communications sold its stations, including KTOU-LD, to Innovate Corp. in 2017.

== Subchannels ==
The station's signal is multiplexed:

Subchannels of KTOU-LD
Subchannel	Res.	Short name	Programming
22.1	480i	KTOU-LD	QVC 365
22.2	480i	KTOU-LD	SonLife (4:3)
22.3	480i	KTOU-LD	Defy
22.4	480i	KTOU-LD	Newsmax2
22.5	480i	KTOU-LD	Infomercials (4:3)
22.6	480i	KTOU-LD	Fubo Sports Network (KOHC-CD)
22.7	480i	KTOU-LD	Jewelry TV (4:3)

Simulcast of subchannels of another station
