= MTV Tres =

American cable, satellite and over-the-air network

MTV Tr3s
- Logo used since 2010
- Country: United States
- Broadcast area: Nationwide

Programming
- Languages: English; Spanish
- Picture format: 480i (SDTV)

Ownership
- Owner: Skydance Global Cable Media (Skydance)
- Parent: MTV Entertainment Group
- Sister channels: CNN en Español; Cinemax; Discovery en Español; Discovery Familia; HBO Latino

History
- Launched: August 1, 1998; 28 years ago
- Replaced: MásMúsica TeVe (1998–2006); MTV Español (2001–2006)
- Former names: MTV S (1998–2001); MTV Español (2001–2006)

Availability

Streaming media
- Service(s): DirecTV Stream, FuboTV, YouTube TV

MTV Tres, stylized as Tr3́s, is an American pay television network owned by Skydance Global Cable Media, a subsidiary of Skydance. The channel is targeted toward bilingual Latinos and non-Latino Americans aged 12 to 34, and its programming formerly included lifestyle series, customized music video playlists, news documentaries that celebrate Latino culture, music and artists and English-subtitled programming in Spanish, imported from MTV Spain and MTV Latin America, as well as Spanish-subtitled programming from MTV. The network's logo is rendered as tr3s, with an acute accent over the number 3 (which in the actual audible name is a reversed capital É). Tres broadcasts on an Eastern Time schedule with one national feed for all providers. As of August 2013, MTV Tres was available to approximately 36 million pay television households (totaling 32% of households with television) in the United States.

== History ==
=== MTV Español ===
MTV Español logo.

On August 1, 1998, MTV Networks launched a 24-hour digital cable channel, MTV S (the "S" standing for "Spanish"). On October 1, 2001, the channel was relaunched as MTV Español, focusing on music videos by Latin rock and pop artists. The rebranded network mainly utilized the eight-hour automated music video playlist wheel used by sister networks MTV2, MTV Hits and MTVX (later MTV Jams) without any original programming, except for repurposed content from MTV's Latin America networks.

=== Acquisition of MásMúsica TeVe ===
Más Música logo.

Más Música TeVe, founded in 1998, was a network distributed in the United States on pay television that aired music videos from diverse Latin music styles, including salsa, cumbia, regional Mexican, and contemporary Spanish-language hits. Founded by Eduardo Caballero of Caballero Television, MásMúsica TeVe carried the minimum requirements of educational and public affairs programming on weekends, and it was carried mainly on low-power television stations throughout the United States.

In December 2005, Viacom acquired MásMúsica and ten of the network's affiliated stations. The sale was closed down in January 2006.

=== Launch of MTV Tres ===
MTV Tr3s logo used from 2006 to 2010.

MTV Tres was unofficially launched on September 4, 2006, when it became available on all subscription providers that recently carried MTV Español. On September 25, 2006, MTV Español and MásMúsica TeVe officially merged. The first program to air on the newly formed channel was the premiere of Mi TRL at 4:30 p.m. Eastern Time.

In its beginnings, MTV Tres's programming schedule was significantly more repetitive than MTV Español was in its last days. The channel aired shows such as Hola, My Name is MTV Tres, the Top 20 Countdown, Los Hits, Mis #1s, Sucker Free Latino (only running two new shows per week), Latina Factor, Mi TRL, MTV Trespass, Los Premios MTV Latinoamérica 2006, Making the Video and Diary; the latter two and many other programs from MTV are merely subtitled into Spanish rather than carrying re-dubbed versions. These programs were repeated for most of the day, which greatly reduced the amount of freeform music videos played on the channel. As months passed, however, the programming became more varied and different, with changing music video blocks airing several times in the day.

=== Relaunch as Tres ===
On July 12, 2010, MTV Tres dropped the MTV name from its logo and name, officially rebranding as simply Tres. With the rebrand, the network expanded its programming to include additional acquired MTV programs and series from Viacom's Latin American networks. Eventually, Viacom re-sold some of the stations acquired in the Más Música deal in California and Texas back to Caballero Television, and after its 2019 sale of its last broadcast asset before the re-acquisition of CBS Corporation, the network is cable-only.

== Programming ==
=== Music video programs ===
Since 2014, MTV Tres broadcasts music videos for at least 22 hours each day (though like their sister networks NickMusic and CMT Music, the titles of the 'programs' now merely delineate an hour for electronic program guides than provide any actual video theming).

==== Current ====
- Exitos – Current hits
- 2x1 – Two videos from the same artist are played consecutively
- Fresh – Videos recently added to the network's playlist
- La Hora Nacional – Independent and alternative artists
- Tropicalismo – Reggaeton, Bachata and Tropical
- ReMexa – Banda, Ranchera, Duranguense and Norteña

==== Former ====
- Classic Co. – The program, which aired weekdays at 10:00 a.m. Eastern Time, featured a mix of videos from Latino artists of the 1980s and 1990s such as Selena, Ricky Martin, and Marc Anthony. The title is most likely an English-language play on the Spanish term for "classic", clásico, as the title might stand for "Classic Company". The program was discontinued in early 2008.
- Los Hits – Based on MTV's Big Ten and Más Música's Los Top 10, this program featured the most popular videos in rotation on MTV Tr3s. It was hosted by Carlos Santos or Denise Ramirez featuring interviews with popular artists, however the program would drop its VJ format in March 2007. The program was discontinued in mid-2007.
- Tr3s or False – This program was a music video/text message-based game show that awarded viewers points, which could be redeemed for prizes, for answering questions correctly. The program was discontinued in early 2009.
- Music My Guey – This program focuses on viewer requested music videos.
- Top 20 – Similar to Las 40 Principales from Más Música, this program is a countdown of the top 20 videos in rotation on the channel during the week. In late June 2008, the network changed the show's format; most music videos are no longer played in their entirety; the show has been hosted since that point by Carlos Santos.
- TXTO (pronounced "texto", Spanish for "text") – This program is a block of music videos requested by callers who send text messages to the channel, in English or Spanish, dedicating videos to friends or family. Although it is loosely based on Tu Email from Más Música, TXTO does not feature a VJ who reads the e-mails. However, there may be occasional VJ spots in the program. TXTO URB is a spinoff series that is dedicated to urban music videos.
- ¡Rock! – This program aired mostly during the late night hours, and featured a mix of rock music videos from U.S. and Latin American bands. Among the U.S. bands featured in the lineup were the Deftones, which contain Latino vocalist Chino Moreno and turntablist Frank Delgado, and Incubus, which contain Latino drummer Jose Pasillas. The program was discontinued in October 2007.
- MixMex – A music video program featuring artists from Mexico; it was replaced with ReMexa in March 2009.
- Street Mix (later known as El Sonidero) – A block of urban music videos, focusing on hip-hop, reggaeton and R&B artists, and includes Spanish-speaking artists with occasional American videos from non-Latino, English-speaking artists.(was called EL Sonidero until September 2008)
- Videoteca (formally known as V.P.M., short for Video Party Music) – This program focused on rhythmic videos; Videoteca was cancelled on July 12, 2010, concurrent with the network's relaunch.
- Videorama – General music video mix that aired during the daytime hours
- Videosomnia – General music video mix that aired during the overnight hours (Similar to MTV After Hours)
- Clasicos – Classic music videos (though most are from after 2010 but before 2015)
- Cafeina – Early morning music video mix
- El Flow – Latin urban contemporary music videos

The following music video programs were hosted by VJ's who primarily host in English:

- Sucker Free Latino – Hosted by L. Boogs; this program is similar to Más Música's Zona Urbana and is based on MTV's Sucker Free, featuring popular hip-hop, R&B and reggaeton music videos, mostly from Latino artists; however, some of the featured videos may be performed by U.S. artists like The Fugees or Ludacris, with interviews included (replaced with SFL5)
- Mi TRL – Based on MTV's Total Request Live and Más Música's Pidelo, and hosted by Carlos Santos, new episodes air each Thursday at 4:30 p.m. Eastern Time (with rebroadcasts throughout the week on Tr3s as well as rebroadcasts on MTV Hits); the program featured the ten most requested videos based on voting on the MTV Tr3s website, featuring live performances and interviews (discontinued along with TRL in November 2008, then revived in February 2009 as Entertainment as a Second Language)
- Indie 101 – Hosted by Martin Chan, this program – which is similar in format to Más Música's Rokmania – focuses on indie rock bands from Latin America.

=== Non-music programming ===
The network currently has no original or individual programs airing as the network switched to an all music video format in 2018.

Some reality and scripted series formerly aired on the channel, including MTV originals featuring Spanish subtitling, as well as from MTV Latin America and Nickelodeon Latin America (which were natively broadcast in Spanish and subtitled in English for broadcast on U.S. television). These types of programs aired for no more than three hours at a time. Some of the programs had little or nothing to do with Latino culture and possibly only aired on Tres to allow Viacom to maintain syndication rights to the programs without threatening ratings on higher-profile networks.

For a short time from July until October 2010, Tres carried a block of programming known as "Tres Jr.", which carried Spanish-language dubs of Nick Jr.'s Blue's Clues (Spanish-titled as Pistas de Blue and featuring Steve Burns-era episodes) and Wonder Pets!.

Class A affiliates (and previously, former full-power affiliate KBEH-TV) carried a second feed of the network with English-language repeats of Allegra's Window and Gullah Gullah Island in order to fulfill E/I programming requirements set by the Federal Communications Commission.

==== Former programming ====
- Beavis and Butt-Head (dubbed in Spanish)
- Bellator Fighting Championships
- Blue's Clues (Pistas de Blue, dubbed in Spanish)
- Boiling Points
- Casados con hijos (Colombian version of Married... with Children, subtitled)
- DanceLife
- Dismissed
- Entertainment as a Second Language
- George Lopez
- I Bet You Will
- Impact Wrestling (wrestling show, translated into Spanish)
- Isa TKM
- Jersey Shore
- Juegos Prohibidos
- Karlifornia
- Lucha Libre USA: Masked Warriors
- Lugar Heights
- Mind of Mencia
- Mis videos locos
- Music My Güey
- Nick Cannon Presents: Short Circuitz
- Niñas mal
- Pimpeando
- Quiero mi boda – a show involving elaborate weddings
- Quiero mis quinces – a Latin American version of My Super Sweet 16 centering around quinceañeras
- Rock Dinner
- Room Raiders
- Speak Tr3s
- SpongeBob SquarePants (Bob Esponja, dubbed in Spanish)
- Wonder Pets! (Las mascotas maravilla, dubbed in Spanish)
- Yo soy Jenni Rivera

== Free-to-air affiliates ==
Most of the broadcast stations that aired MTV Tres served communities with large Hispanic populations. Upon the merger of Más Música and MTV Tres, however, former Más Música affiliate WZXZ-CA in Orlando, Florida, switched to MTV2, before affiliating with America TéVé, and WUBX-CA and WBXU-LP in the Raleigh/Durham/Fayetteville, North Carolina, market ceased operations completely. Eventually Viacom let their affiliation agreements lapse with their broadcast affiliates, and those other stations have become affiliates of other networks, or ceased all operations. Viacom's carriage agreements with cable providers also often saw the Tres cable channel preferred for carriage over a local affiliate, and most stations were unable to find cable coverage with Tres programming, notwithstanding existing complications involving low-power stations and cable carriage. KVMM-CD, channel 41 of Santa Barbara, California, was the only MTV Tres affiliate that still broadcast free-to-air until May 20, 2019, as well as the only over-the-air broadcast asset that the 2005–19 Viacom entity had remaining, until it was sold to HC2 Holdings on February 15, 2019.

List of final MTV Tres over-the-air affiliates
City	State	Station	Channel
Kingman	Arizona	KMOH-TV	6
Fresno	California	KHMM-CD	23
Fresno	California	KZMM-CD	22
Los Angeles	California	KBEH	63
Los Angeles	California	KBLM-LP	38
Los Angeles	California	KPLM	25
Palm Springs	California	KDUO-LP	43
Sacramento	California	KMMK-LP	14
Sacramento	California	KMUM-CD	15
Sacramento	California	KMMW-LD	47
Salinas–Monterey–Santa Cruz	California	KMMD-CD	39
San Diego	California	KSDY-LD	50
San Francisco	California	KMMC-LD	40
San Luis Obispo	California	KMMA-CD	41
Santa Barbara	California	KVMM-CD	41
Santa Maria	California	KQMM-CD	29
Denver	Colorado	KLPD-LD	28.2
West Palm Beach	Florida	WBWP-LD	57
Atlanta	Georgia	WANN-LD	32.2
Atlanta	Georgia	WTBS-LP	26
Indianapolis	Indiana	WBXI-CA	47
Amarillo	Texas	KAMM-LP	30
Austin	Texas	KGBS-CD	19
Beaumont	Texas	KUMY-LD	22
Brownsville	Texas	XHRIO-TV	2
Corpus Christi	Texas	KCBO-LP	49
Dallas–Fort Worth	Texas	KATA-CD	50
Del Rio–Eagle Pass	Texas	KVAW	16
McAllen–Harlingen	Texas	KMBH-LD	67
McAllen–Harlingen	Texas	KTIZ-LP	52
Midland–Odessa	Texas	KMDF	22
San Antonio	Texas	KMHZ-LP	11
