= Lugar Heights =

- The main cast of Lugar Heights. From left to right: Manos, Roxy, Hugo, and China.
- Genre: Animated sitcom
- Country of origin: United States
- Original language: English

Original release
- Network: Galavision mun2 MTV Tres
- Release: 2001 – 2008

Lugar Heights is an American animated comedy television series and sitcom that aired on Galavision, mun2, and MTV Tres. It is located in an urban American city, where the main characters attend Lugar Heights High School, and involves the day-to-day life of teenagers.

Lugar Heights began as a series of 5-minute web shorts in 2001. These shorts were sold to Galavision. The show later become a half-hour series for mun2, before once again becoming a 5-minute series, this time for MTV Tres. Reruns were aired on BET. In a DVD-exclusive episode ("Chickens of Mass Destruction"), John Leguizamo provides the voice of Spanish Fly.

== Characters ==
The central characters are four teenage Latinos: China, Roxy, Hugo, and Manos; supporting characters are The Twins.

China is the leader of the group who is usually the most naive of all of them. She has a lot of confidence and is very attractive and popular. She is usually the voice of reason between the group and is the most considerate. Her best friend is Roxy. She is Colombian and Puerto Rican.

Manos is the full-fledged Latino out of everyone in the group. He is very nice but very sensitive. He was discriminated from going shopping because of his ethnicity. But, he has a large family. He likes to tease China and Roxy. His best friend is Hugo, though they both sometimes fight (as seen in episode 3).

Roxy is a darker skinned Latina at times mistakenly thought to be African American. She is usually the first to engage in stupid schemes. She has natural Latino curves which never fail to impress guys. She lives with an abusive mother also. She is Dominican.

Hugo is usually the instigator of the group. He is also the toughest. He is Manos's best friend who he sometimes gets into fights with. Hugo loves to tease and trick China and Roxy. He is Puerto Rican.

The Blond-cita twins are two irritable teens who have a resentment of Roxy and China. They hate to lose to them. They always make insults about them. But they are fairly weak and cannot defend themselves when someone talks back to them.

== Production ==
Produced by Piragua Productions, Lugar Heights has six episodes. mun2 and Galavision broadcast the show. It has an urban focus and offers "satire, dark humor and social parody".

== Reception ==
In a mostly positive review, Kevin Polowy of Video Store Magazine wrote, "Some of the comedy can be juvenile — and the plots tend to get screwy, but Lugar Heights is mostly intelligently and playfully written. Teens are more likely to appreciate the hip-hop generation jokes and more contemporary satire, like a take on dating shows in 'Holy Guacamole', but the clever social commentary and spoofs on movies like The Matrix, I Know What You Did Last Summer and The Shawshank Redemption will have universal appeal." According to Polowy, "young adults or maybe even teens will be those doting on this oft-amusing series whose all-Latino cast of characters has a Saved by the Bell dynamic and a skill for solving Scooby-Doo-esque mysteries." Cable World's Cable World called Lugar World "an edgy, urban animated series".
