= CobbTV =

- Country: United States
- Broadcast area: Cobb County, Georgia
- Network: government-access channel, Pentagon Channel (overnights)
- Headquarters: Marietta, Georgia

Programming
- Language(s): English
- Picture format: 480i

Ownership
- Owner: Cobb County, Georgia

CobbTV is a Government-access television channel (GATV) cable TV channel in Cobb County, Georgia, seen on Comcast TV channel 23, and in ATSC clear QAM on digital cable channel 81.23. TV23 presents a variety of TV programming for the interest of Cobb County residents, including county commission and other local government meetings, educational and informational programming on various issues and services, and Cobb Traffic Watch LIVE, which features views from Cobb DOT and Georgia DOT traffic cameras in Cobb during weekday rush hours. Overnight, it now carries the Pentagon Channel, after previously carrying old educational TV programs.

Cobb County School District school board meetings are carried on Cobb edTV, channel 24.

== See also ==
- Channel 23 (disambiguation)
