= KAZD =

Television station in Lake Dallas, Texas

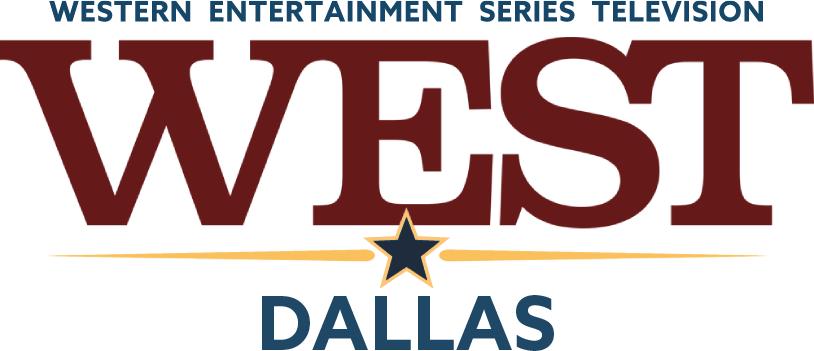

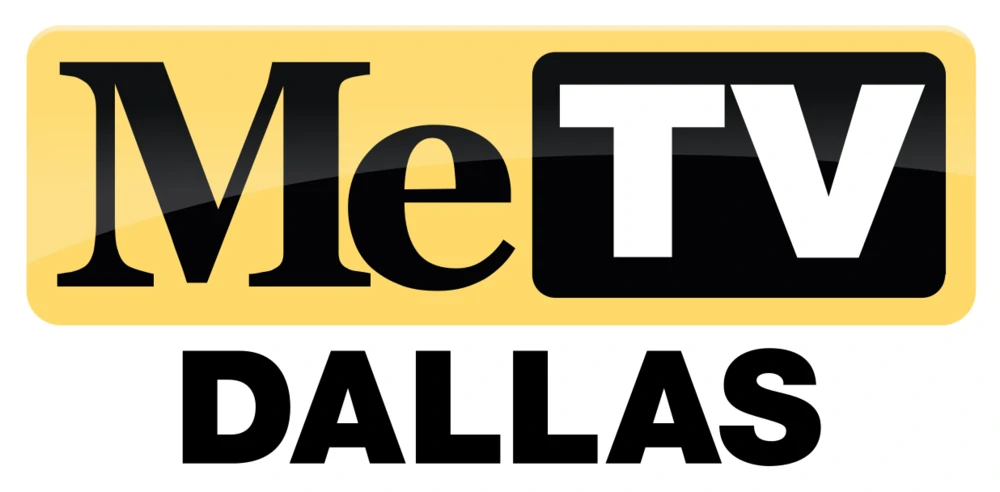
- Lake Dallas–Dallas–Fort Worth, Texas; United States
- City: Lake Dallas, Texas
- Channels: Digital: 31 (UHF); Virtual: 55
- Branding: MeTV Dallas (55.2)

Programming
- Affiliations: 55.1: WEST; 55.2: MeTV; for others, see § Subchannels

Ownership
- Owner: Weigel Broadcasting; (KAZD-TV LLC)

History
- First air date: March 18, 1997
- Former call signs: KAVB (May−June 1997); KLDT (June 1997–2010)
- Former channel numbers: Analog: 55 (UHF, 1999–2007); Digital: 54 (UHF, 2006–2009), 39 (UHF, 2009–2020)
- Former affiliations: Independent (general)/ACN (1999–2000); HTVN (2000–2003); ShopNBC (2003–2005 and 2009–2010); Independent (infomercials) (2005–2006 and November−December 2010); Gems TV (2006–2008); OnTV4U/WizeBuys TV (2008–2009); Liquidation Channel (April−November 2010); Azteca América (December 2010–2021, later on 55.3); MeTV (2021–2022, now on 55.2); Simulcast of Spectrum News 1 (2022–2025); MeTV+ (2025, now on 55.4)
- Call sign meaning: Azteca América Dallas (former affiliation)

Technical information
- Licensing authority: FCC
- Facility ID: 17433
- ERP: 1,000 kW
- HAAT: 510 m (1,673 ft)
- Transmitter coordinates: 32°35′15″N 96°58′0″W

Links
- Public license information: Public file; LMS
- Website: metv.com/kazd

KAZD (channel 55) is a television station licensed to Lake Dallas, Texas, United States, serving the Dallas–Fort Worth area as an outlet of WEST and MeTV. Owned by Weigel Broadcasting, KAZD maintains offices on McKinney Avenue in downtown Dallas, and its transmitter is located south of Belt Line Road in Cedar Hill.

== History ==
=== Prior history of UHF channel 55 in Dallas–Fort Worth ===
The UHF channel 55 allocation in the Dallas–Fort Worth market was formerly occupied by KLDT (standing for either "Lake Dallas, Texas" or "Lake Dallas Television"), which signed on the air on December 25, 1990. The station was founded as a joint venture between Opal Thornton and Johnson Broadcasting (owned by businessman Doug Johnson). The station's programming originally consisted of Christian-oriented music videos, before converting to a general religious format. The station's original transmitter site was located in Lewisville.

Thornton, unable to find programming resources and operating capital, attempted to add Dallas-based preacher Robert Tilton as a partner, with KLDT to serve as the flagship television outlet for his "Word of Faith" ministry. However, Tilton's poor record with the Federal Communications Commission (FCC) prevented this, and the request was dropped by 1991 amidst an exposé on Tilton and other televangelists that aired on the ABC newsmagazine Primetime Live. KLDT was noted for a hefty $15,500 fine that was imposed by the FCC in 1995 for failing to adequately staff its main studio, for not making its public inspection file freely available, and for other filing violations. The station lost its license in the mid-1990s.

=== KAZD station history ===
The current channel 55 was founded on March 18, 1997, as KAVB, with the granting of the original construction permit to Johnson Broadcasting of Dallas, LLC. The application was mutually exclusive with the license renewal application of the first KLDT station, but the FCC granted the Johnson Broadcasting application and did not renew the license of the previous station.

Short-lived KLDT-DT 55 logo prior to affiliation with Azteca America.

Shortly after its sign-on, the station quickly changed its call letters to KLDT. Originally served as an affiliate of the America's Collectibles Network home shopping service (now Jewelry Television), the station soon relegated shopping programming to the nighttime hours, and began broadcasting syndicated classic television series and movies, as well as business news programming from Bloomberg Television, collegiate sporting events syndicated by ESPN Plus, Lone Star Park horse racing, and Houston Astros Major League Baseball games simulcast from sister station KNWS-TV (now KYAZ) in Houston. During this time, the station adopted the slogan "TV55 Has the Shows You Know".

By 2000, KLDT quietly dropped most of its entertainment programming in favor of infomercials, or shopping programming from ACN. However, that same year, the station received a much needed shot in the arm. KLDT subsequently became the flagship station of the Hispanic Television Network, which aired programming targeted towards Hispanic viewers from Mexico. Due to several missteps, the network ceased operations in 2003 and the station again broadcast home shopping programs, affiliating with ShopNBC.

By this time, most of the station's sports programming had moved to former Telemundo affiliate KFWD (channel 52), which became a general entertainment independent in January 2002. In 2005, KLDT became the temporary broadcaster of the FC Dallas Major League Soccer team, whose game telecasts also eventually moved to KFWD. The station eventually dropped its ShopNBC affiliation and began to fill its empty timeslots with infomercials and religious programming. Two weeks prior to shutting down its analog signal, KLDT became an affiliate of Gems TV. In 2008, KLDT reverted to an infomercial format, this time through the OnTV4U and WizeBuys networks; on November 2, 2009, KLDT re-affiliated with ShopNBC.

"KAZD Azteca 55" logo used from December 2010 to July 2011.

Johnson Broadcasting filed for Chapter 11 bankruptcy protection in October 2008. One year later, impatient creditors asked the bankruptcy court to allow the sale of KLDT and KNWS. Una Vez Más Holdings, LLC emerged as the leading bidder. The sale to Una Vez Más was approved by the bankruptcy court on December 29, 2009, and finally received FCC approval on September 27, 2010, after the FCC rejected a petition to deny the sale made by the Spanish Broadcasting System. On September 30, 2010, Una Vez Mas requested a call sign change to KAZD in order reflect its intended affiliation with Azteca América. Plans for KLDT had originally called for the station to carry the Retro Television Network to its second digital subchannel (54.2), but due to the bankruptcy filing, those plans were immediately scrapped.

The station broadcast all of its program audio on a second audio program feed until February 2009. In April 2010, KLDT became an affiliate of the Liquidation Channel (now Shop LC). With the exception of two religious programs and one children's program, the majority of KLDT's programming consisted of infomercials and the Liquidation Channel feed. However, in mid-November 2010. KLDT switched to infomercials (although it continued to carry religious programming). Throughout the years, KLDT had suffered several technical setbacks, almost to the point where they had to go off the air for several hours. The station formally changed its call letters to KAZD on December 30, 2010, and became an affiliate of Azteca América at 9 p.m. on that date.

In 2014, Una Vez Mas' TV assets (including KAZD) were then sold to Northstar Media, LLC. In turn, HC2 Holdings acquired Northstar Media in addition to Azteca América on November 29, 2017, making KAZD an Azteca owned-and-operated station.

On September 14, 2020, Weigel Broadcasting announced that it would buy three of HC2's TV properties (including KAZD and its longtime Houston sister KYAZ) as well as a low-power station. The sale was consummated on December 29, making this the fourth ownership change in 11 years and Weigel's first entry into the Dallas–Fort Worth market. KAZD and KYAZ became MeTV owned-and-operated stations on March 29, 2021. On May 14, 2021, Decades was added to the DT2 subchannel, moved from KDFW-DT2. On September 27, 2021, MeTV's secondary network, MeTV Plus, launched on KAZD-DT4 as well as sister station KYAZ-DT2.

On July 15, 2022, a simulcast of Spectrum News 1 Dallas/Fort Worth was added to KAZD-DT1, with MeTV moving to KAZD-DT2 and Decades moving to KAZD-DT6. Previously, Spectrum News 1 Dallas/Fort Worth was only available to subscribers of the Spectrum cable service owned and operated by Charter Communications. With the local station having must-carry status on competing providers, Spectrum News 1 Dallas/Fort Worth became the second Spectrum News channel to be available to systems other than Spectrum.

On July 31, 2025, KAZD's main signal was switched from Spectrum News 1 to MeTV+, which still broadcasts on KAZD-DT4.

== Technical information ==
=== Subchannels ===
The station's signal is multiplexed:

Subchannels of KAZD
Subchannel	Res.	Short name	Programming
55.1	720p	WEST	WEST
55.2	720p	MeTV	MeTV
55.3	720p	TOONS	MeTV Toons
55.4	480i	MeTV+	MeTV+
55.5	480i	STORY	Story Television
55.6	480i	CATCHY	Catchy Comedy

=== Analog-to-digital conversion ===
On May 22, 2006, KAZD—as KLDT—signed on its digital signal on UHF channel 54. This would be key, as Qualcomm, which was launching its ill-fated MediaFLO service on 716–722 MHz (the frequency corresponding to UHF channel 55), would request them to stop using channel 55. On November 17, 2006, the Federal Communications Commission gave permission for KLDT to shut off its analog transmitter facilities and "flash-cut" to its final digital channel at the end of the digital transition period.

KLDT shut down its analog signal, over UHF channel 55, on January 1, 2007. The station's digital signal remained on its pre-transition UHF channel 54 in the interim, becoming the first station in the market to broadcast exclusively in digital. On June 12, 2009, KLDT relocated its digital signal to UHF channel 39 after KXTX shut down its analog signal on that channel, using virtual channel 54 from 2007 to 2010; in December 2010, what is now KAZD changed its virtual channel to 55. UHF TV channels 52 through 69 were removed from television broadcast use as a part of the transition from analog to digital.

== See also ==
- KYAZ (sister station in Houston)
