= Hispanic Television Network =

Spanish-language television network in the United States

- Type: Broadcast television network
- Country: United States
- Broadcast area: Nationwide
- Headquarters: Fort Worth, Texas

Programming
- Language: Spanish

Ownership
- Owner: Hispanic Television Network, Inc.

History
- Launched: 2000; 26 years ago
- Replaced: Hispano Television Ventures; American Independent Network
- Closed: July 10, 2003; 23 years ago

Hispanic Television Network (HTVN) was a family-oriented television network that was once the third-largest Spanish-language network in the United States, after Univision and Telemundo. It was the first network to specifically target Hispanics of Mexican origin, the first Spanish-language network to take advantage of digital technology, and the first Spanish-language network to broadcast over the Internet.

HTVN operated from 2000 through 2003 and at one time could be viewed over-the-air on nearly 70 television stations, on approximately 300 cable systems, and on the Internet. HTVN was owned by Hispanic Television Network, Inc. of Fort Worth, Texas.

== History ==
=== Launch ===
HTVN was launched in early 2000 following the creation of Hispanic Television Network, Inc. from the merger of Hispano Television Ventures, Inc. and English-language network American Independent Network, Inc. (AIN), both of Fort Worth. While the new company owned both HTVN and AIN, it focused the majority of its attention on HTVN. The network's facilities were all-digital and state-of-the-art.

=== Success ===
The new network expanded rapidly, and by March 2000, appeared on 25 television stations, including those in top-10 Hispanic markets Los Angeles, Dallas, Phoenix, San Antonio and Brownsville, Texas.

By June 2000, HTVN had announced deals with Yahoo! to broadcast network programming on the Internet, and with Mexinema and Excalibur Media Group to give HTVN the rights to over 500 Mexican-made, Spanish-language movies. It was now on nearly 60 television stations, including full-service flagship station KLDT in the Dallas/Fort Worth area. Including cable coverage, HTVN reached over 20 million homes.

By the end of the year, HTVN had added full-service KJLA in the Los Angeles market and had partnered with Mexican broadcasting giant MVS Television, providing the network access to MVS' state-of-the-art production facilities and talent base, allowing HTVN to produce programming in the United States, which was scarce at that time.

=== Decline ===
The rapid growth proved to be costly, however, as HTVN's owners reported a 14,492% increase in expenses from first quarter 1999 to first quarter 2000, no doubt the bulk of it from launching the new network. Furthermore, the network did not produce nearly sufficient revenues to cover expenses and their owners announced a $38 million loss for 2000 against only $620,955 in revenue.

By 2002, HTVN had all but abandoned its over-the-air strategy and was turning its attention to mostly cable distribution. Still, the network was not bringing in sufficient revenue to cover its expenses, and despite its owners' attempts to acquire revenue from other sources, they filed for Chapter 11 reorganization in July 2002.

In early 2003, Hispanic Television Network, Inc. sold its cable agreements to Hispanic children's network, ¡Sorpresa! and on July 10, 2003, HTVN formally ceased operations.

== Stations that carried the network ==
- KTVP-LD - Phoenix, Arizona (1999-2002) (O&O)
- KLDT - Lake Dallas, Texas (2000-2003) (O&O)
- KVAW - Eagle Pass, Texas (2000-2003) (O&O)
- KLHO-LD - Oklahoma City, Oklahoma
- KTOU-LD - Oklahoma City, Oklahoma (O&O)
- K17MJ-D - San Antonio, Texas

== See also ==
- American Independent Network
- HITN TV
