= KGBS-CD =

Television station in Austin, Texas

- Austin, Texas; United States
- Channels: Digital: 19 (UHF); Virtual: 19

Programming
- Affiliations: see § Subchannels

Ownership
- Owner: Innovate Corp.; (HC2 Station Group, Inc.)
- Sister stations: KVAT-LD

History
- Founded: April 15, 1994
- First air date: July 29, 1995
- Former call signs: K65GB (1994–1995); KGBS-LP (1995–2003); KGBS-CA (2003–2014)
- Former channel numbers: Analog: 65 (UHF, 1994–1995), 32 (UHF, 1995–2014); Virtual: 32 (2014–2020)
- Former affiliations: Independent (1994–2001); Más Música (2001–2006); MTV Tres (2006–2015); Roar (201?–202?)
- Call sign meaning: From translator call sign K65GB

Technical information
- Licensing authority: FCC
- Facility ID: 38562
- Class: CD
- ERP: 15 kW
- HAAT: 353.8 m (1,161 ft)
- Transmitter coordinates: 30°19′23.8″N 97°47′59.5″W

Links
- Public license information: Public file; LMS

KGBS-CD (channel 19) is a low-power, Class A television station in Austin, Texas, United States. The station is owned by Innovate Corp.

== History ==
The station was built and signed on by local Austin businessman Juan Wheeler Jr., and was at first an independent station, affiliated with the Spanish-language network Telemundo. K65GB was financed by funds from KVAW, the Wheeler-owned Telemundo station in Eagle Pass. In 2001, Caballero Television, a television broadcasting company run by Eduardo Caballero, acquired KGBS-LP; the station became affiliated with Más Música, a network that Caballero also owned, which broadcast Spanish music videos 24 hours a day. In December 2005, Viacom acquired Más Música and ten of the network's affiliated stations, including KGBS. The sale was finalized in January 2006, when Más Música became MTV Tres. In 2014, CNZ Communications reached a deal to purchase KGBS from Viacom, and the sale was finalized in 2015. Shortly after the sale and the conversion to digital television, KGBS dropped the MTV Tres affiliation and began showing all infomercials once again on its main channel. The station also added subchannels with additional programming.

== Subchannels ==
The station's signal is multiplexed:

Subchannels of KGBS-CD
Subchannel	Res.	Short name	Programming
19.1	480i	KGBS-CD	Infomercials (4:3)
19.2	480i	KGBS-CD	America's Voice Español
19.3	480i	KGBS-CD	NTD America
19.4	480i	KGBS-CD	Defy
19.5	480i	KGBS-CD	Infomercials (4:3)
19.6	480i	KGBS-CD	SonLife (4:3)
19.7	480i	KGBS-CD	Advenimiento TV
