= Cottonwood, Illinois =

- Unincorporated community
- Location within Illinois Location within the United States
- Coordinates: 37°53′21″N 88°12′47″W
- Country: United States
- State: Illinois
- County: Gallatin
- Township: Asbury
- Elevation: 413 ft (126 m)
- Time zone: UTC-6 (Central (CST))
  - Summer (DST): UTC-5 (CDT)
- Area code: 618
- GNIS feature ID: 406627

Cottonwood is an unincorporated community in Asbury Township, Gallatin County, Illinois, United States. Cottonwood is 5 miles (8.0 km) east of Omaha.
