= KVAW =

Television station in Eagle Pass, Texas

Currently silent
- Eagle Pass, Texas; United States
- Channels: Digital: 18 (UHF); Virtual: 24

Programming
- Affiliations: Telemundo (1991–1996); SUR (1996–2000); HTVN (2000–2003); Mas Musica (2003–2006); Tr3́s (2006–2008); Multimedios Televisión (2008–2009); Independent (2009–2022)

Ownership
- Owner: Núcleo Radio Televisión; (NRT Communications Group, LLC)

History
- First air date: June 15, 1991
- Former channel numbers: Analog: 16 (UHF, 1991–2009)

Technical information
- Licensing authority: FCC
- Facility ID: 32621
- ERP: 50 kW
- HAAT: 84.7 m (278 ft)
- Transmitter coordinates: 28°43′32.3″N 100°28′33.5″W

Links
- Public license information: Public file; LMS

KVAW (channel 24) is a television station in Eagle Pass, Texas, United States, which is currently silent. Founded June 29, 1989, the station is owned by the NRT Communications Group, the American arm of Núcleo Radio y Televisión, which owns media assets in the Mexican state of Coahuila. KVAW formerly carried programming from Telemundo, HTVN as an owned-and-operated station, and later from Mas Musica, the predecessor of the station's latest network, Tr3́s, and Multimedios Televisión.

== History ==
The Federal Communications Commission (FCC) granted to Juan Wheeler, Jr., a permit on June 29, 1989, to construct a new television station that would serve Eagle Pass on UHF channel 16. The station signed on June 15, 1991; Wheeler applied for a license for the station on June 14, 1991, which was not granted until January 1996. During this time, KVAW operated as a Telemundo affiliate serving the immediate Eagle Pass/Piedras Negras area, including local news. In 1996, with Wheeler eyeing coverage in San Antonio where a Telemundo station already existed, he changed the program source to SUR and began simulcasting on an LPTV station, K52EA (now unrelated K17MJ-D). The station's nonexistent signal in San Antonio, however, hampered efforts to force San Antonio's cable systems to carry it.

The station was sold to HTVN in August 2000 under unusual circumstances, as a dispute arose over ownership of the station, which was settled in court in HTVN's favor. HTVN filled out Wheeler's portion of the application to assign the license and it was signed on Wheeler's behalf by the sheriff of Maverick County, in which Eagle Pass is located, as Wheeler was thought to have left the country. After HTVN went bankrupt, ownership of the station passed to Dr. Joseph Zavaletta in December 2003, and it became an affiliate of Mas Musica. On September 25, 2006, Mas Musica was revamped as the new MTV Tr3́s network, which was created as a result of Viacom's acquisition of Mas Musica.

In 2008, Dr. Zavaletta affiliated KVAW with Multimedios Televisión, which has a strong presence in northeast Mexico. In July, KVAW relaunched as the Multimedios station for the Eagle Pass/Piedras Negras area with cable coverage extending from Del Rio to the Cinco Manantiales region. The brief flirtation with Multimedios ended in February 2009, resulting in the closure of the local operation set up just seven months prior.

== Digital television ==
In the final FCC DTV channel allotment, released December 18, 1998, KVAW was assigned channel 18 for pre-transition digital operations. During the process of the sale of the station to HTVN, it was discovered that the initial owner had not filed an application for a digital channel, and faced with losing the opportunity to operate a paired digital facility, HTVN filed the application, which was approved by the FCC. HTVN was not able to build the digital facilities due to its bankruptcy, but Dr. Zavaletta completed construction and applied for a license to operate on channel 18 in November 2006. Zavaletta initially selected channel 18 for post-transition operations, but later had the FCC change the allotment to channel 24.

== License revocation and reinstatement ==
The expense of building digital facilities and operations in a small, rural town, which limited revenue opportunities, soon began to take its toll, and Zavaletta first began seeking a buyer for the station, then requested to move the station's transmitter location closer to San Antonio, in order to increase the population of its service area. Before construction could begin on the new facilities, Mexican approval of the request would need to be obtained, due to the station's proximity to Mexico. KVAW would have to be broadcasting on its final post-transition channel by the end of the DTV conversion, June 12, 2009, and since the FCC had changed the allocation from channel 18 to channel 24, it was no longer authorized to broadcast on channel 18. The station filed for Special Temporary Authorization (STA) to continue operations on channel 18 following June 12, 2009, but that authorization expired August 18 and would need to be renewed. The STA was not renewed and on December 7, 2009, the station went silent again, due to financial reasons. Silent broadcast facilities must return to air within one year of going silent, or the license can be revoked, and on December 2, 2010, the station notified the FCC that it had resumed operations as of November 30. When the station once again filed for Silent STA on December 17, 2010, it was discovered that its authorization to broadcast had expired August 18, 2009, and since unauthorized operations did not count, the station was deemed to have not legally broadcast for more than a year, and the FCC revoked the station's license on February 15, 2011. Then, on March 11, 2011, the FCC reversed its decision and reinstated KVAW's license and its application to transfer the station from the estate of Dr. Zavaletta to NRT Communications Group, LLC. The sale was approved by the FCC two months later.

Early in 2013, NRT, which is associated with a Mexican company that owns several radio and local cable stations in Coahuila, returned KVAW to the air. It currently brands as channel 24. It carries some programs relayed from its cable stations in Saltillo and Monclova.
