= W23BW-D =

Television station in Madison, Wisconsin

- Madison, Wisconsin; United States
- Channels: Digital: 23 (UHF); Virtual: 23
- Branding: TV23

Programming
- Affiliations: see § Subchannels

Ownership
- Owner: Innovate Corp.; (HC2 Station Group, Inc.)
- Sister stations: WZCK-LD

History
- Founded: January 4, 1989
- First air date: August 16, 1990
- Former call signs: W54BH (1989–2001); W23BW (2001–2014)
- Former channel number: Analog: 54 (UHF, 1989–2001), 23 (UHF, 2001–2014)
- Former affiliations: 3ABN (1990–2020); Azteca América (2020–2022)

Technical information
- Licensing authority: FCC
- Facility ID: 67000
- Class: CD
- ERP: 15 kW
- HAAT: 121.9 m (400 ft)
- Transmitter coordinates: 43°3′9″N 89°28′42″W

Links
- Public license information: LMS

W23BW-D (channel 23) is a low-power Class A television station in Madison, Wisconsin, United States. The station is owned by Innovate Corp. alongside WZCK-LD (channel 8).

== History ==
W54BH, known as "WSSM-TV", began broadcasting in March 1989. It was owned by Chicago TV weatherman Dan Dobrowolski, who had previously been the general manager of another Madison LPTV, W05BD; that station left the owner when owner Warren Cave resisted an attempt by Dobrowolski to take over and carted away his equipment. WSSM assumed the sports- and movie-heavy schedule that W05BD had broadcast. WSSM leased a cable channel on the local system, but when it changed formats in November 1989 to The Jukebox Network, an all-request music video channel, the cable system removed it from its lineup. After the switch, the station closed its Madison offices and became little more than a laserdisc player and a transmitter on the roof of the Concourse Hotel. It also failed in its attempts to be reinstated on cable.

In March 1994, after being sold to the Three Angels Broadcasting Network (3ABN), the low-power station began airing its Seventh-day Adventist programming. W54BH was moved to channel 23 in 2001 to accommodate the pre-transition digital signal of WREX in Rockford, Illinois. The station continued to broadcast 3ABN and, when the station flash cut to digital in 2014, several of its audio channels.

In 2017, W23BW was sold to HC2 Holdings as part of a 14-station, $9.6 million sale of Three Angels-owned LPTV stations. The deal made W23BW the second LPTV station in Madison owned by HC2, which also operates WZCK-LD through its DTV America subsidiary. On October 30, 2020, HC2 would make changes to W23BW's subchannel lineup. 3ABN would remain in the lineup per terms of the purchase agreement between HC2 and Three Angels but would relocate to subchannel 23.5. The main channel, 23.1, would see the addition of HC2-owned Azteca América, giving W23BW the distinction of being Madison's first full-time Spanish-language television station, as well as the 2nd full-time Spanish broadcast outlet in the market (after WLMV radio). Spanish language programming was augmented in September 2021 via the addition of the telenovela focused Novelisima network added to 23.6. Content from the infomercial and classic TV service Timeless TV would replace Azteca América on January 1, 2023, after that network ceased operations. Novelisima would eventually relocate to the primary subchannel remaining the only secular Spanish language over-the-air television option in the Madison area.

== Subchannels ==
The station's signal is multiplexed:

Subchannels of W23BW-D
Subchannel	Res.	Short name	Programming
23.1	480i	W23BW-D	Busted
23.2	480i	W23BW-D	Buzzr
23.3	480i	W23BW-D	Defy
23.4	480i	W23BW-D	NTD America
23.5	480i	W23BW-D	3ABN
23.6	480i	W23BW-D	Oxygen
23.7	480i	W23BW-D	Infomercials (4:3)
23.8	480i	W23BW-D	Oxygen
