= Channel 23 TV stations in Canada =

The following television stations broadcast on digital or analog channel 23 in Canada:

- CHAN-TV-6 in Wilson Creek, British Columbia
- CHCH-DT-3 in Muskoka, Ontario
- CIMT-DT-8 in Cabano, Quebec
- CIVI-DT in Victoria, British Columbia
- CIVP-DT in Chapeau, Quebec
- CJCH-TV-8 in Marinette, Nova Scotia
- CKTN-TV-2 in Taghum, British Columbia
