= K17MJ-D =

Television station in San Antonio

- San Antonio, Texas; United States
- Channels: Digital: 17 (UHF); Virtual: 51

Programming
- Affiliations: see § Subchannels

Ownership
- Owner: Innovate Corp.; (HC2 LPTV Holdings, Inc.)
- Sister stations: K25OB-D, KISA-LD, KSAA-LD, KVDF-CD

History
- First air date: December 9, 1991
- Former call signs: K52EA (1991−2006); K51JF (2006−2017)
- Former channel number: Analog: 52 (UHF, 1993−2001), 50 (UHF, 2001−2006), 51 (UHF, 2006−2017)
- Former affiliations: Independent (1991−1998, 2000–2006); UPN (1998–2000); Multimedios (2006−20??); HTVN; FETV; Infomercials; Sports First TV

Technical information
- Licensing authority: FCC
- Facility ID: 2555
- Class: LD
- ERP: 15 kW
- HAAT: 132.6 m (435 ft)
- Transmitter coordinates: 29°26′29.9″N 98°30′22.8″W

Links
- Public license information: LMS
- Website: K17MJ-D Section on HC2 Broadcasting Website

K17MJ-D (channel 51) is a low-power television station in San Antonio, Texas, United States. Owned by Innovate Corp., it mostly broadcasts subchannels featuring infomercials and diginets.

== History ==
This station began broadcasting in 1991 as independent outlet K52EA; it was based in the Tower Life Building and aired religious programming from the Faith Pleases God Church in Harlingen. In the mid- to late 1990s, it was a translator for Ortiz-owned KTRG-TV of Del Rio. It served as the only full-time source of UPN programming in San Antonio from June 1998 until the 2000 launch of KBEJ (channel 2). The station was acquired by Hispanic Television Network (HTVN) in a deal announced in 1999. It picked up the Multimedios network in early 2006 and moved to channel 51 in December of that same year, changing its call sign to K51JF.

In June 2013, K51JF was slated to be sold to Landover 5 LLC as part of a larger deal involving 51 other low-power television stations; the sale fell through in June 2016.

The station was issued its license for digital broadcasting on channel 17 on August 29, 2017, changing its call sign to K17MJ-D.

Mintz Broadcasting sold the station to HC2 Holdings in 2017.

== Subchannels ==
The station's signal is multiplexed:

Subchannels of K17MJ-D
Subchannel	Res.	Short name	Programming
51.1	480i	K17MJ-D	Hasbro Legends
51.2	480i	K17MJ-D	QVC 365
51.3	480i	K17MJ-D	Advenimiento TV
51.4	480i	K17MJ-D	America's Voice Español
51.5	480i	K17MJ-D	Outlaw
51.6	480i	K17MJ-D	Confess
51.7	480i	K17MJ-D	365BLK
51.8	480i	K17MJ-D	[Blank] (4:3)
