= KTVP-LD =

Television station in Phoenix, Arizona

- Phoenix, Arizona; United States
- Channels: Digital: 23 (UHF); Virtual: 23

Programming
- Affiliations: see § Subchannels

Ownership
- Owner: Innovate Corp.; (HC2 LPTV Holdings LLC)

History
- Founded: September 28, 1992
- First air date: November 28, 1995
- Former call signs: K56FF (1992–1997); KTVP-LP (1997–2011)
- Former channel numbers: Analog: 56 (UHF, 1995–2002), 64 (UHF, 2002–2006), 22 (UHF, 2006–2011); Digital: 22 (UHF, 2011–2019)
- Former affiliations: American Independent Network (1995–1996); Hispanic Television Network (1999–2002); America's Store (2002–2007)
- Call sign meaning: Television Phoenix

Technical information
- Licensing authority: FCC
- Facility ID: 60465
- Class: LD
- ERP: 15 kW
- HAAT: 468.5 m (1,537 ft)
- Transmitter coordinates: 33°19′57″N 112°3′59″W

Links
- Public license information: LMS

KTVP-LD (channel 23) is a low-power television station in Phoenix, Arizona, United States. The station is owned by Innovate Corp. KTVP-LD's transmitter is located on South Mountain.

== History ==
The original construction permit was granted September 28, 1992 to Simon, Inc. The station was given call sign K56FF, to broadcast on channel 56 from Usery Mountain in east Mesa. In March 1995, Simon, Inc. sold the permit to Keith L. Lowery, who licensed the station on November 28, 1995, then sold it to AIN Network, Inc. in June 1996. The station was listed as an American Independent Network affiliate as of July 1996. AIN Network, Inc. changed the station's calls to KTVP-LP in September 1997 and transferred the station to Hispano Television Ventures, Inc. (HTV), later called Hispanic Television Network Inc., in October 1999 as part of HTV's acquisition of AIN Network, Inc. HTV placed their new network, Hispanic Television Network (HTVN), on KTVP-LP, but facing financial difficulties, Hispanic Television Network Inc. sold the station to Mako Communications LLC in August 2001.

In 1998, ABC affiliate KNXV-TV (channel 15) was granted a permit to construct their digital facilities on channel 56, which forced KTVP-LP to move to a new channel. The station went silent for a time, but in 2002, Mako Communications moved the transmitter location to South Mountain and began broadcasting the America's Store shopping channel on channel 64. In January 2006, needing to vacate the 700 MHz band, KTVP-LP moved to channel 22. At that time, Mako Communications also switched programming to Almavision. On June 13, 2011, reflecting its conversion to digital operation, the station's call sign was changed to KTVP-LD.

In June 2013, KTVP-LD was slated to be sold to Landover 5 LLC as part of a larger deal involving 51 other low-power television stations; the sale fell through in June 2016. Mako Communications sold its stations, including KTVP-LD, to HC2 Holdings in 2017.

== Subchannels ==
The station's signal is multiplexed:

Subchannels of KTVP-LD
Subchannel	Res.	Short name	Programming
23.1	480i	KTVP-LD	NTD America
23.2	480i	KTVP-LD	SonLife (4:3)
23.3	480i	KTVP-LD	Shop LC (4:3)
23.4	480i	KTVP-LD	QVC 365
23.5	480i	KTVP-LD	Fubo Sports Network
23.6	480i	KTVP-LD	Infomercials (4:3)
23.7	480i	KTVP-LD	Infomercials (4:3)

== Former translators ==
KTVP-LD's signal was formerly relayed on the following translator stations:

City	Callsign
Prescott, Arizona	K32LO-D
Yuma, Arizona	K24NI-D
Payson, Arizona	K34PG-D
Flagstaff, Arizona	K19IP-D
Verde Valley, Arizona	K46IL-D
