= Asbury Township, Gallatin County, Illinois =

Asbury Township
- Township
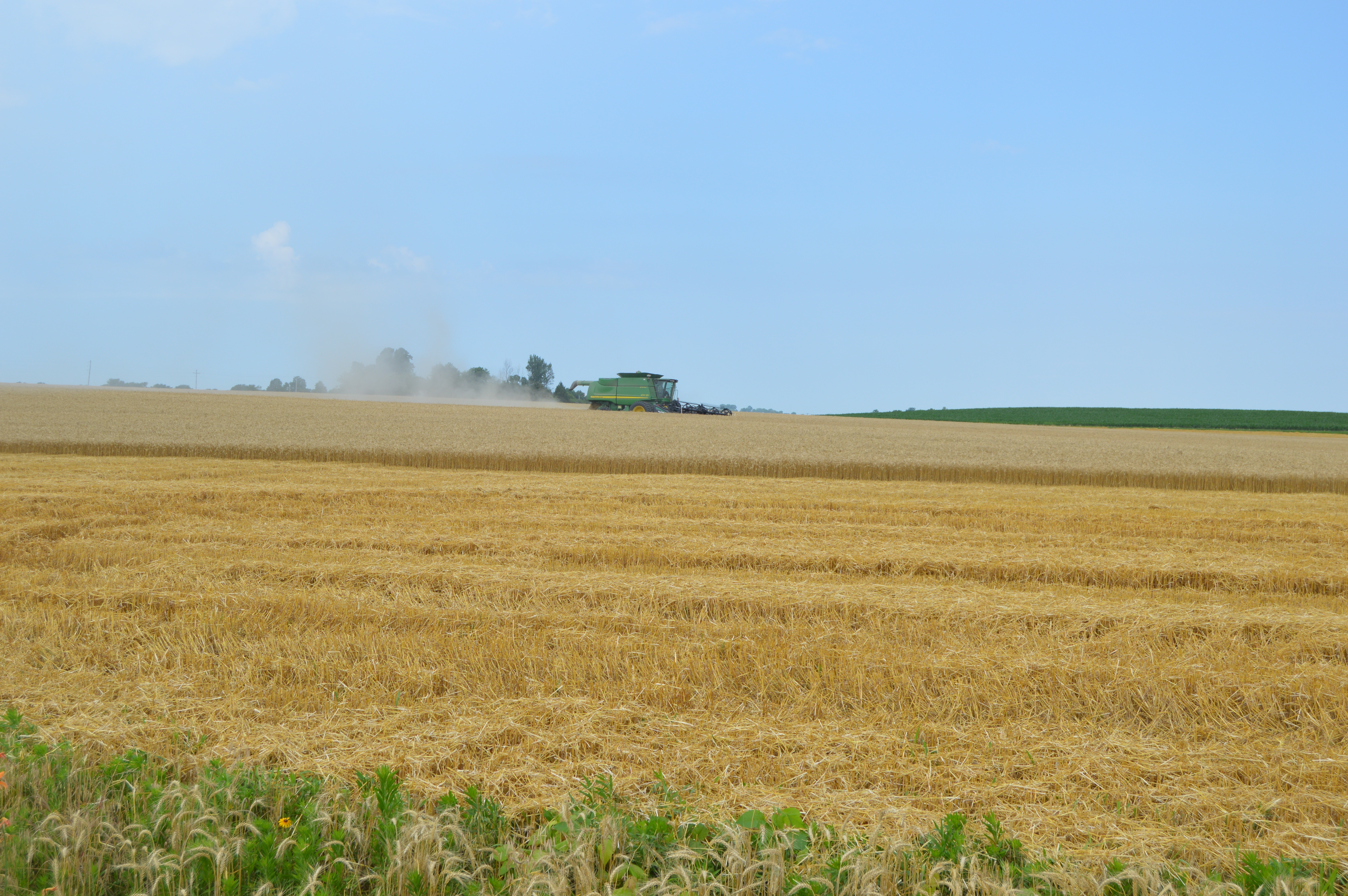
- Wheat harvest along New Haven-Shawneetown Road

- Location in Gallatin County

- Gallatin County's location in Illinois
- Coordinates: 37°53′16″N 88°12′45″W
- Country: United States
- State: Illinois
- County: Gallatin
- Established: November 5, 1890

Area
  - Total: 17.86 sq mi (46.3 km^{2})
  - Land: 17.83 sq mi (46.2 km^{2})
  - Water: 0.03 sq mi (0.078 km^{2}) 0.15%
- Elevation: 410 ft (125 m)

Population (2020)
  - Total: 115
  - Density: 6.45/sq mi (2.49/km^{2})
- Time zone: UTC-6 (CST)
  - Summer (DST): UTC-5 (CDT)
- ZIP codes: 62867, 62871
- FIPS code: 17-059-02427

Asbury Township is one of ten townships in Gallatin County, Illinois, USA. As of the 2020 census, its population was 115 and it contained 53 housing units.

== Geography ==
According to the 2021 census gazetteer files, Asbury Township has a total area of 17.86 square miles (46.26 km^{2}), of which 17.83 square miles (46.18 km^{2}) (or 99.85%) is land and 0.03 square miles (0.08 km^{2}) (or 0.15%) is water.

=== Unincorporated towns ===
- Cottonwood at 37.889213°N 88.213094°W

(This list is based on USGS data and may include former settlements.)

=== Cemeteries ===
The township contains these two cemeteries: Cottonwood Presbyterian Church and Swan.

== Demographics ==
As of the 2020 census there were 115 people, 23 households, and 15 families residing in the township. The population density was 6.44 inhabitants per square mile (2.49/km^{2}). There were 53 housing units at an average density of 2.97 per square mile (1.15/km^{2}). The racial makeup of the township was 100.00% White, 0.00% African American, 0.00% Native American, 0.00% Asian, 0.00% Pacific Islander, 0.00% from other races, and 0.00% from two or more races. Hispanic or Latino of any race were 0.00% of the population.

There were 23 households, none of which had children under the age of 18 living with them, 65.22% were married couples living together, none had a female householder with no spouse present, and 34.78% were non-families. 34.80% of all households were made up of individuals, and 34.80% had someone living alone who was 65 years of age or older. The average household size was 1.96 and the average family size was 2.47.

The township's age distribution consisted of 0.0% under the age of 18, 0.0% from 18 to 24, 0% from 25 to 44, 0% from 45 to 64, and 100.0% who were 65 years of age or older. The median age was 68.2 years. For every 100 females, there were 50.0 males. For every 100 females age 18 and over, there were 50.0 males.

The median income for a household in the township was $58,958. The per capita income for the township was $31,436. None of the population was below the poverty line.

Historical population
Census	Pop.	Note	%±
2000	146		—
2010	105		−28.1%
2020	115		9.5%
U.S. Decennial Census

== School districts ==
- Gallatin Community Unit School District 7

== Political districts ==
- Illinois' 15th congressional district
- State House District 118
- State Senate District 59
