= American Independent Network =

Television network

American Independent Network logo

The American Independent Network (operated by AIN Network, Inc.) was one of the first major attempts at building a commercial television network consisting of low-powered television stations. Started by Don Shelton, Randy Moseley, and Lyn Snyder, it was similar to the older Channel America (and its successor, America One (A1)), and was the foundation for Urban America TV (UATV). In 2000, several stations sold by USA Networks to Univision carried AIN for about a year while Univision got their second network, TeleFutura, ready to launch on the stations. AIN's operating company merged with Hispano Television Ventures, inc. in early 2000, forming Hispanic Television Network (HTVN; operated by Hispanic Television Network, Inc.). The new company operated both HTVN and AIN, but the majority of the company's attention was focused on HTVN. HTVN went off the air in 2003, while AIN went off the air two years earlier in 2001, and turned into Urban America Television, with most AIN affiliates either going independent or switching to other networks, like A1 or UATV.

== See also ==
- America One
- Channel America
- Hispanic Television Network
- Independent station
- Ion Television
- Network One
- Urban America Television
