= List of stations owned by Innovate Corp. =

This list of stations owned by Innovate Corp. includes the HC2 Broadcasting, HC2 Holdings and DTV America holding company names. Innovate owns and operates 251 television stations, 248 of which are low-power facilities (with 39 as Class A licenses) and three of which operate as full-service facilities. These stations span across 112 designated market areas in the United States ranging from as large as New York, New York, to as small as Quincy, Illinois, and Traverse City, Michigan.

== Current stations ==
Stations owned by Innovate Corp. (d/b/a HC2 Holdings or DTV America)
Media market	State/Terr.	Station	VC	Affiliations	FID	Transmitter coordinates	Notes
Birmingham	Alabama	WUOA-LD	46.1; 46.2; 46.3; 46.4; 46.5; 46.6; 46.7; 46.8	Fubo Sports; Buzzr; Defy; NTD America; [Blank]; Shop LC; NBC True CRMZ; TeleXitos	990	33°29′4.8″N 86°48′25.2″W	
Huntsville	Alabama	W34EY-D	38.1; 38.2; 38.3; 38.4; 38.5; 38.6; 38.7	Busted; NTD America; Get; Buzzr; Salem News Channel; 3ABN; Shop LC	67020	34°45′28″N 86°39′44″W	
Mobile	Alabama	WEDS-LD	29.1; 29.2; 29.3; 29.4; 29.5; 29.6; 29.7	Infomercials; Infomercials; Defy; Infomercials; Salem News Channel; Law & Crime; Fubo Sports	182836	30°27′43.2″N 87°49′50.3″W	
Mobile	Alabama	WWBH-LD	28.1; 28.2; 28.3; 28.4; 28.5; 28.6; 28.7	Infomercials; NTD America; Shop LC; Religious independent; NBC True CRMZ; TeleXitos; Defy	10940	30°36′45.4″N 87°38′41.6″W	
Montgomery	Alabama	WDSF-LD	19.1; 19.2; 19.3; 19.4; 19.5; 19.6; 19.7	Infomercials; Buzzr; Infomercials; Shop LC; Defy; Law & Crime; Fubo Sports	183641	32°25′17″N 86°25′47″W	
Montgomery	Alabama	WQAP-LD	36.1; 36.2; 36.3; 36.4; 36.5; 36.6; 36.7	Infomercials; NBC True CRMZ; TeleXitos; NTD America; Salem News Channel; Defy; Infomercials	182913	32°25′17″N 86°25′47″W	
Tuscaloosa	Alabama	WUDX-LD	28.1	Infomercials	182919	33°25′43.2″N 88°12′8.3″W	
Phoenix	Arizona	K12XP-D	22.1; 22.2; 22.3; 22.4; 22.5; 22.6; 22.7	Infomercials; Salem News Channel; Infomercials; Infomercials; Infomercials; Infomercials; Aqui TV	7085	33°19′57.1″N 112°3′58.6″W	
Phoenix	Arizona	KPDF-CD	41.1; 41.2; 41.3; 41.4; 41.5; 41.6; 41.7; 41.8	Visión Latina; LATV; ESNE TV; Jewelry TV Español; Shop LC; [Blank]; EEE Network; Law & Crime	73764	33°20′04.2″N 112°3′43.5″W	
Phoenix	Arizona	KTVP-LD	23.1; 23.2; 23.3; 23.4; 23.5; 23.6; 23.7	NTD America; SonLife; Shop LC; Infomercials; Fubo Sports; The First TV; Infomercials	60465	33°19′57″N 112°3′59″W	
Fayetteville	Arkansas	KAJL-LD	16.1; 16.2; 16.3; 16.4; 16.5; 16.6; 16.7	Shop LC; Sonlife; Defy; Buzzr; Outlaw; Busted; 365BLK	184686	36°8′50″N 94°11′14″W	
Fort Smith	Arkansas	KFLU-LD	20.1; 20.2; 20.3; 20.4; 20.5; 20.6; 20.7; 20.8	Law & Crime; Defy; Outlaw; Cozi TV; American Crimes; Heroes & Icons; 365BLK; Salem News Channel	188049	36°8′50″N 94°11′14″W	
Hot Springs	Arkansas	K23OW-D	39.1; 39.2; 39.3; 39.4; 39.5; 39.6	Infomercials; Defy; Infomercials; Infomercials; 365BLK; Outlaw	188822	34°27′31.7″N 93°9′26.1″W	
Little Rock	Arkansas	KENH-LD	41.1; 41.2; 41.3; 41.4; 41.5; 41.6; 41.7	Shop LC; Fubo Sports; [Blank]; Defy; 365BLK; Outlaw; Law & Crime	188823	34°47′53″N 92°29′34″W	(Note: Nominally licensed to Hot Springs, Arkansas.)
Little Rock	Arkansas	KWMO-LD	34.1; 34.2; 34.3; 34.4; 34.5; 34.6	Defy; [Blank]; Get; 365BLK; NBC True CRMZ; Oxygen	188821	34°47′53″N 92°29′34″W	
Texarkana	Arkansas	K36MU-D	36.1; 36.2; 36.3; 36.4; 36.5; 36.6; 36.7	Outlaw; Infomercials; Infomercials; Defy; Fubo Sports; Cozi TV; NBC True CRMZ	188811	33°37′25.4″N 93°44′13.6″W	
Bakersfield	California	KTLD-CD	8.1; 8.2; 8.3; 8.4; 8.5; 8.6; 8.7	3ABN; Shop LC; NBC True CRMZ; Oxygen; 365BLK; Outlaw; Defy	57456	35°26′17.1″N 118°44′26.3″W	
Bakersfield	California	KXBF-LD	14.1; 14.2; 14.3; 14.4; 14.5; 14.6; 14.7	Sonlife; LATV; Salem News Channel; Sports First TV; 365BLK; Outlaw; Law & Crime	188776	35°21′3.3″N 118°53′45.9″W	
Esparto	California	K04QR-D	38.1; 38.2; 38.3; 38.4; 38.5; 38.6; 38.7	Sports First TV; Infomercials; 365BLK; Outlaw; Law & Crime; Infomercials; Binge TV	65789	38°38′53″N 121°5′54.3″W	
Fremont	California	KEMO-TV	50.1; 50.2; 50.3; 50.4; 50.5	QVC+ Everyday Refresh; NTD; Infomercials; Outlaw; Infomercials	34440	37°45′19″N 122°27′10″W	
Fresno	California	K17JI-D	12.1; 12.2; 12.4; 12.5; 12.6; 12.7	Infomercials; 3ABN; Shop LC; 365BLK; Outlaw; Defy	57457	36°44′44.82″N 119°17′0.43″W	
Fresno	California	KZMM-CD	22.1; 22.2; 22.3; 22.4; 22.5; 22.6; 22.7	Infomercials; Busted; SonLife; Defy; 365BLK; Infomercials; Outlaw	18740	37°4′19.1″N 119°25′52.5″W	
Lompoc	California	KLDF-CD	17.1; 17.2; 17.3; 17.4; 17.5; 17.6; 17.7	Infomercials; Infomercials; 365BLK; Outlaw; Defy; Infomercials; Fubo Sports	41126	34°44′30″N 120°26′50″W	
Los Angeles	California	KHIZ-LD	39.1; 39.2; 39.3; 39.4; 39.5; 39.6; 39.7	Defy; 365BLK; Sports First TV; CBN News; Shop LC; [Blank]; Outlaw	67932	34°13′55″N 118°4′18″W	
Los Angeles	California	KSKJ-CD	45.1; 45.2; 45.3; 45.4; 45.5; 45.6; 45.7; 45.8; 45.9; 45.10; 45.11	Infomercials; Jewelry TV; CBN News; Infomercials; Defy; 365BLK; Outlaw; Salem News Channel; Fubo Sports; Infomercials; Infomercials	36717	34°12′46″N 118°3′44.2″W	(Note: Nominally licensed to Van Nuys, California.)
Middletown	California	KFTY-LD	45.1; 45.2; 45.3; 45.4; 45.5; 45.6; 45.7	Infomercials; Defy; 365BLK; Outlaw; Fubo Sports; Infomercials; Infomercials	182644	38°40′8.6″N 122°37′56.9″W	
Modesto	California	K36QQ-D	49.1; 49.2; 49.3; 49.4; 49.5; 49.6; 49.7	Shop LC; Infomercials; Infomercials; 365BLK; Outlaw; Fubo Sports; Defy	68022	37°38′59.4″N 121°1′27.3″W	
Modesto	California	KFKK-LD	32.1; 32.2; 32.3; 32.4; 32.5; 32.6; 32.7	Infomercials; 365BLK; Defy; Outlaw; Binge TV; Infomercials; Salem News Channel	184264	37°38′59.4″N 121°1′27.3″W	(Note: Nominally licensed to Stockton, California.)
Monterey	California	K09AAF-D	9.1; 9.2; 9.3; 9.4; 9.5; 9.6; 9.7	365BLK; Outlaw; Defy; Busted; MovieSphere Gold; Sports First TV; Fubo Sports	185788	36°45′22″N 121°30′10″W	
Morgan Hill	California	KQRO-LD	45.1; 45.2; 45.3; 45.4; 45.5; 45.6; 45.7	Sports First TV; Fubo Sports; Infomercials; 365BLK; Outlaw; Binge TV; Salem News Channel	182144	37°7′7.8″N 121°50′0.8″W	
Palm Springs	California	K21DO-D	21.1; 21.2; 21.3; 21.4; 21.5; 21.6; 21.7; 21.8	365BLK; Outlaw; Moviesphere Gold; Busted; Start TV; Defy; Infomercials; Jewelry TV	67013	33°52′1.07″N 116°26′6.08″W	
Sacramento	California	K20JX-D	27.1; 27.2; 27.3; 27.4; 27.5	Good News TV; GNTV Latino; GNTV Kids; Amazing Facts TV; GNTV Music	334	38°49′58″N 121°19′9″W	(Note: Owned by Amazing Facts and operated by Innovate Corp.)
Sacramento	California	KBTV-CD	8.1; 8.2; 8.3; 8.4; 8.5; 8.6; 8.7	Buzzr; "Crossings TV"; Sonlife; 365BLK; Defy; Newsmax2; Outlaw	2424	38°33′58.9″N 121°28′50.4″W	
Sacramento	California	KAHC-LD	43.1; 43.2; 43.3; 43.4; 43.5; 43.6; 43.7	Infomercials; NTD America; Infomercials; Defy; 365BLK; Infomercials; Outlaw	67970	38°38′53″N 121°28′41.4″W	
Sacramento	California	KFMS-LD	47.1; 47.2; 47.3; 47.4; 47.5; 47.6; 47.7	Infomercials; Shop LC; Defy; 365BLK; Infomercials; Fubo Sports; Outlaw	182091	38°38′53″N 121°28′41.4″W	
San Luis Obispo	California	KSBO-CD	42.1; 42.2; 42.3; 42.4; 42.5; 42.6; 42.7	Infomercials; MovieSphere Gold; Defy; 365BLK; Outlaw; Infomercials; Infomercials	31354	35°21′39.4″N 120°39′25″W	
San Marcos	California	KSKT-CD	43.1; 43.2; 43.3; 43.4; 43.5; 43.6; 43.7; 43.8; 43.9; 43.10; 43.11	MovieSphere Gold; Get; Jewelry TV; Buzzr; Defy; Infomercials; 365BLK; Infomercials; Outlaw; Infomercials; Infomercials	58927	33°0′32″N 116°58′19″W	
Santa Barbara	California	KVMM-CD	41.1; 41.2; 41.3; 41.4; 41.5; 41.6; 41.7	MovieSphere Gold; NBC True CRMZ; Cozi TV; Buzzr; Defy; 365BLK; Outlaw	18741	34°27′56.9″N 119°40′41.4″W	
Santa Barbara	California	KZDF-LD	8.1; 8.2; 8.3; 8.4; 8.5; 8.6; 8.7	Sonlife; Defy; 365BLK; Outlaw; Sports First TV; Infomercials; Law & Crime	41124	34°27′54.9″N 119°40′41.4″W	
Santa Maria	California	KDFS-CD	30.1; 30.2; 30.3; 30.4; 30.5; 30.6; 30.7	MovieSphere Gold; Infomercials; 365BLK; Salem News Channel; Outlaw; Infomercials; Binge TV	31351	34°53′52.2″N 120°35′26.4″W	
Santa Maria	California	KQMM-CD	29.1; 29.2; 29.3; 29.4; 29.5; 29.6; 29.7	Sonlife; Infomercials; Shop LC; Defy; 365BLK; Outlaw; Infomercials	167844	34°54′35.9″N 120°11′13.5″W	
Turlock	California	KBIS-LD	38.1; 38.2; 38.3; 38.4; 38.5; 38.6; 38.7	Infomercials; Defy; Infomercials; 365BLK; Outlaw; Fubo Sports; Infomercials	182085	37°38′59.4″N 121°1′27.3″W	
Cripple Creek, etc.	Colorado	KRDH-LD	5.1; 5.2; 5.3; 5.4; 5.5; 5.6; 5.7	Sonlife; Defy; Infomercials; Law & Crime; Shop LC; Outlaw; 365BLK	167809	39°23′6″N 105°2′51″W	
Hartford	Connecticut	WRNT-LD	32.1; 32.2; 32.3; 32.4; 32.5; 32.6; 32.7	Jewelry TV; Daystar Español; MovieSphere Gold; Daystar; Shop LC; Buzzr; Hasbro Legends	26336	41°47′48.4″N 72°47′48.5″W	
Hartford	Connecticut	WTXX-LD	34.1; 34.2; 34.3; 34.4; 34.5; 34.6	MovieSphere Gold; Infomercials; Law & Crime; Aqui TV; Fubo Sports; Salem News Channel	31453	41°37′4.9″N 72°58′16.5″W	(Note: Nominally licensed to Springfield, Massachusetts.)
Clearwater	Florida	WXAX-CD	26.1; 26.2; 26.3; 26.4; 26.5; 26.6	Defy; Jewelry TV Español; Infomercials; Shop LC; CBN News; Law & Crime	57538	27°49′10.8″N 82°15′38″W	
Fort Myers–Naples	Florida	WGPS-LD	22.1; 22.2; 22.3; 22.4; 22.5; 22.6; 22.7; 22.8; 22.9; 22.10	Cozi TV; Get; Sonlife; Outlaw; Defy; Busted; Daystar; 365BLK; Infomercials; Daystar Español	55090	26°26′55.4″N 81°48′53.7″W	
Fort Pierce	Florida	WDOX-LD	32.1; 32.2; 32.3; 32.4; 32.5; 32.6; 32.7	Infomercials; Defy; 365BLK; Infomercials; Shop LC; The First TV; Law & Crime	182904	27°27′58.7″N 80°27′54.1″W	(Note: Nominally licensed to Palm Beach, Florida.)
Fort Pierce	Florida	WXOD-LD	33.1; 33.2; 33.3; 33.4; 33.5; 33.6; 33.7	Defy; Infomercials; 365BLK; Cozi TV; NBC True CRMZ; Infomercials; Infomercials	183693	27°27′58.7″N 80°27′54.1″W	
Jacksonville	Florida	WJXE-LD	10.1; 10.2; 10.3; 10.4; 10.5; 10.6; 10.7	Infomercials; Defy; Law & Crime; 365BLK; Outlaw; Infomercials; Infomercials	182298	30°16′35.3″N 81°33′50.7″W	(Note: Nominally licensed to Gainesville, Florida.)
Jacksonville	Florida	WKBJ-LD	20.1; 20.2; 20.3; 20.4; 20.5; 20.6; 20.7	Buzzr; Infomercials; Defy; Infomercials; 365BLK; Shop LC; Outlaw	182931	30°16′34.4″N 81°33′51.3″W	
Jacksonville	Florida	WODH-LD	31.1; 31.2; 31.3; 31.4; 31.5; 31.6; 31.7	The First TV; Infomercials; Infomercials; NBC True CRMZ; Oxygen; 365BLK; Outlaw	182282	30°16′35.3″N 81°33′50.7″W	
Jacksonville	Florida	WRCZ-LD	35.1; 35.2; 35.3; 35.4; 35.5; 35.6; 35.7	Infomercials; Infomercials; Fubo Sports; 365BLK; Outlaw; Defy; Game Show Central	185536	30°16′34.4″N 81°33′51.3″W	(Note: Nominally licensed to Ocala, Florida.)
Orlando	Florida	WATV-LD	47.1; 47.2; 47.3; 47.4; 47.5; 47.6; 47.7	Fubo Sports; Infomercials; Defy; Salem News Channel; 365BLK; Outlaw; Infomercials	67101	28°35′12.6″N 81°4′57.5″W	
Orlando	Florida	WFEF-LD	50.1; 50.2; 50.3; 50.4; 50.5; 50.6; 50.7	ULFN; Roar; Shop LC; 365BLK; Outlaw; Defy; [Blank]	182336	28°34′28″N 81°27′45″W	
Tampa	Florida	W16DQ-D	43.1; 43.2; 43.3; 43.4; 43.5; 43.6; 43.7	HSN; Infomercials; The First TV; Defy; Infomercials; Fubo Sports; Infomercials	4330	27°49′10.8″N 82°15′38″W	
Tampa	Florida	W31EG-D	15.1; 15.2; 15.3; 15.4; 15.5; 15.6	Aqui TV; Sonlife; Infomercials; Infomercials; Infomercials; Defy	6029	27°49′10.8″N 82°15′38″W	
Tampa	Florida	WTAM-LD	30.1; 30.2; 30.3; 30.4; 30.5; 30.6; 30.7	Infomercials; Defy; Infomercials; Infomercials; Infomercials; Aqui TV; Salem News Channel	168552	27°49′10.8″N 82°15′38″W	
Vero Beach	Florida	WWCI-CD	10.1; 10.2; 10.3; 10.4; 10.5; 10.6; 10.7	NTD America; Infomercials; Defy; Salem News Channel; 365BLK; Infomercials; Fubo Sports	18894	27°44′51.7″N 80°34′40.7″W	
Westgate	Florida	W16CC-D	16.1; 16.2; 16.3; 16.4; 16.5; 16.6; 16.7; 16.8	Buzzr; SonLife; LATV; 365BLK; Outlaw; Tropik Network; Fubo Sports; [Blank]	4331	25°59′35.3″N 80°10′26″W	
Atlanta	Georgia	WDWW-LD	28.1	365BLK	125861	33°48′27″N 84°20′21″W	
Atlanta	Georgia	WUEO-LD	49.1; 49.2; 49.3; 49.4; 49.5; 49.6; 49.7	Infomercials; Outlaw; Shop LC; Fubo Sports; 365BLK; [Blank]; Defy	182024	33°44′40.9″N 84°21′35.7″W	(Note: Nominally licensed to Macon, Georgia.)
Atlanta	Georgia	WUVM-LD	4.1; 4.2; 4.3; 4.4; 4.5; 4.6	Defy; 365BLK; Infomercials; Outlaw; The First TV; [Blank]	69785	33°48′26″N 84°20′22″W	
Atlanta	Georgia	WYGA-CD	16.1; 16.2; 16.3; 16.4; 16.5; 16.6; 16.7; 16.8; 16.9	CBN News; SonLife; Shop LC; Defy; Outlaw; 365BLK; NBC True CRMZ; Cozi TV; Infomercials	168094	33°44′40.9″N 84°21′35.7″W	
Augusta	Georgia	WIEF-LD	47.1; 47.2; 47.3; 47.4; 47.5; 47.6; 47.7	Infomercials; Infomercials; Infomercials; Get; Buzzr; Salem News Channel; Defy	182466	33°25′17″N 81°50′18″W	
Columbus	Georgia	W29FD-D	43.1; 43.2; 43.3; 43.4; 43.5; 43.6; 43.7	Outlaw; Cozi TV; Infomercials; Get; Defy; Infomercials; Fubo Sports	184013	32°19′16.4″N 84°47′28.2″W	
Columbus	Georgia	W31EU-D	29.1; 29.2; 29.3; 29.4; 29.5; 29.6; 29.7	Infomercials; Infomercials; Infomercials; Infomercials; Infomercials; Infomercials; Aqui TV	181861	32°35′55.4″N 85°12′19.7″W	
Macon	Georgia	W28EU-D	42.1; 42.2; 42.3; 42.4; 42.5; 42.6; 42.7	NBC True CRMZ; Cozi TV; Infomercials; Infomercials; Shop LC; Get; Defy	182095	33°3′1.2″N 83°57′9.8″W	
Macon	Georgia	WJDO-LD	44.1; 44.2; 44.3; 44.4; 44.5; 44.6; 44.7	The First TV; Infomercials; Salem News Channel; Defy; Infomercials; Law & Crime; Fubo Sports	182012	32°44′58.4″N 83°33′34.5″W	
Savannah	Georgia	WDID-LD	26.1; 26.2; 26.3; 26.4; 26.5; 26.6; 26.7	Outlaw; Busted; Shop LC; Defy; Salem News Channel; NBC True CRMZ; Oxygen	191242	32°5′47.2″N 81°19′9.6″W	
Savannah	Georgia	WUET-LD	43.1; 43.2; 43.3; 43.4; 43.5; 43.6; 43.7	Outlaw; Infomercials; Defy; Fubo Sports; NTD America; Law & Crime; Busted	181193	32°5′47.2″N 81°19′9.6″W	
Valdosta	Georgia	W21EL-D	21.1; 21.2; 21.3; 21.4; 21.5; 21.6; 21.7	Outlaw; Fubo Sports; Nosey; Law & Crime; Infomercials; Infomercials; Salem News Channel	182930	30°42′7.8″N 83°6′53.5″W	
Boise	Idaho	K31FD-D	31.1; 31.2; 31.3; 31.4; 31.5; 31.6; 31.7	3ABN; Confess; NTD America; Infomercials; Outlaw; 365BLK; Infomercials	11644	43°45′17.63″N 116°5′55.4″W	
Boise	Idaho	KBKI-LD	27.1; 27.2; 27.3; 27.4; 27.5; 27.6; 27.7	The First TV; Defy; Confess; Shop LC; Outlaw; 365BLK; Fubo Sports	182620	43°48′56.7″N 116°46′13.8″W	
Boise	Idaho	KFLL-LD	25.1; 25.2; 25.3; 25.4; 25.5; 25.6; 25.7	Infomercials; NBC True CRMZ; Oxygen; Outlaw; Infomercials; 365BLK; Infomercials	183638	43°37′17.05″N 116°12′59.14″W	
Payette	Idaho	K17ED-D	17.1; 17.2; 17.3; 17.4; 17.5; 17.6; 17.7	Infomercials; 3ABN; Law & Crime; Defy; Outlaw; 365BLK; Infomercials	17402	44°3′43.6″N 116°54′25.53″W	
Aurora	Illinois	WAUR-LD	29.1	YTA TV	187839	41°39′55″N 88°34′34″W	
Chicago	Illinois	W31EZ-D	25.1; 25.2; 25.3; 25.4; 25.5	Almavision; Salem News Channel; Shop LC; Defy; LATV	61692	41°53′6.1″N 87°37′17.7″W	
Chicago	Illinois	WPVN-CD	24.1; 24.2; 24.3; 24.4; 24.5; 24.6; 24.7; 24.8; 24.9; 24.10	WIN TV; infomercials; Swaag TV; 365BLK; Timeless TV; Defy; infomercials; Outlaw; Law & Crime; Fubo Sports	168237	41°53′20.7″N 87°37′36″W	
New Athens	Illinois	W09DL-D	42.1; 42.2; 42.3; 42.4; 42.5; 42.6; 42.7	Infomercials; Defy; Fubo Sports; Infomercials; The First TV; Law & Crime; Infomercials	188748	38°21′53.6″N 89°53′23.5″W	(Note: Nominally licensed to Mount Vernon, Illinois.)
New Athens	Illinois	WLEH-LD	48.1; 48.2; 48.3; 48.4; 48.5; 48.6; 48.7	Infomercials; Defy; Infomercials; Aqui TV; Infomercials; Infomercials; Aqui TV	188749	38°21′53.6″N 89°53′23.5″W	(Note: Nominally licensed to St. Louis, Illinois.)
Peoria	Illinois	W27EQ-D	27.1; 27.2; 27.3; 27.4; 27.5; 27.6; 27.7	365BLK; Outlaw; Infomercials; Busted; Defy; Fubo Sports; Infomercials	185325	40°37′19″N 89°28′36″W	
Salem	Illinois	W29CI-D	29.1; 29.2; 29.3; 29.4; 29.5; 29.6; 29.7	365BLK; NBC True CRMZ; TeleXitos; 3ABN; Defy; Busted; Salem News Channel	66996	38°33′45.18″N 88°59′57.27″W	
Springfield	Illinois	W23EW-D	41.1; 41.2; 41.3; 41.4; 41.5; 41.6; 41.7	Defy; NTD America; Shop LC; Busted; 365BLK; Outlaw; Fubo Sports	181987	39°44′54.3″N 89°31′57.5″W	
Springfield	Illinois	WEAE-LD	21.1; 21.2; 21.3; 21.4; 21.5; 21.6; 21.7	Confess; Defy; 365BLK; Outlaw; Busted; Law & Crime; Nosey	181983	39°46′51.2″N 89°36′18.2″W	
Springfield	Illinois	WCQA-LD	16.1; 16.2; 16.3; 16.4; 16.6; 16.7; 16.8	365BLK; Get; Busted; Outlaw; Defy; NBC True CRMZ; Oxygen	181971	39°58′15.8″N 89°10′27.7″W	
Evansville	Indiana	WDLH-LD	24.1; 24.2; 24.3; 24.4; 24.5; 24.6; 24.7	Infomercials; Busted; The First TV; Infomercials; Defy; 365BLK; Infomercials	183861	37°59′11.3″N 87°16′12.3″W	
Evansville	Indiana	WEIN-LD	40.1; 40.2; 40.3; 40.4; 40.5; 40.6; 40.7	Buzzr; NBC True CRMZ; Oxygen; Defy; 365BLK; Busted; Law & Crime	187934	37°58′40.6″N 87°33′8.8″W	
Evansville	Indiana	WELW-LD	30.1; 30.2; 30.3; 30.4; 30.5; 30.6; 30.7	MovieSphere Gold; Defy; Confess; Nosey; Fubo Sports; Busted; Salem News Channel	181921	37°58′40.6″N 87°33′8.8″W	
Fort Wayne	Indiana	W25FH-D	43.1; 43.2; 43.3; 43.4; 43.5; 43.6; 43.7	Outlaw; Infomercials; Buzzr; 365BLK; Defy; Fubo Sports; Infomercials	183652	41°5′56.9″N 85°8′42″W	
Fort Wayne	Indiana	W30EH-D	40.1	Infomercials	183651	41°5′56.9″N 85°8′42″W	(Note: Operating in ATSC 3.0 (NextGen TV) format.)
Fort Wayne	Indiana	WCUH-LD	16.1; 16.2; 16.3; 16.4; 16.5; 16.6; 16.7	Outlaw; 365BLK; Buzzr; NBC True CRMZ; Oxygen; Fubo Sports; Law & Crime	183648	41°5′56.9″N 85°8′42″W	
Fort Wayne	Indiana	WFWC-CD	45.1; 45.2; 45.3; 45.4; 45.5; 45.6; 45.7	Defy; Get; NTD America; Sonlife; Outlaw; MovieSphere Gold; Shop LC	67485	41°5′56.9″N 85°8′42″W	
Fort Wayne	Indiana	WODP-LD	49.1	Infomercials	183653	41°5′56.9″N 85°8′42″W	
Gary	Indiana	KPDS-LD	49.1; 49.2; 49.3; 49.4; 49.5; 49.6; 49.7	NTD America; Infomercials; Infomercials; Infomercials; Aqui TV; Infomercials; Fubo Sports	184103	41°17′23.7″N 87°17′59.7″W	(Note: Nominally licensed to Wolcott, Indiana.)
Indianapolis	Indiana	WUDZ-LD	28.1; 28.2; 28.3; 28.4; 28.5; 28.6; 28.7	Buzzr; Defy; MovieSphere Gold; Shop LC; NBC True CRMZ; Oxygen; Salem News Channel	184277	39°53′39.2″N 86°12′20.5″W	
Indianapolis	Indiana	WSDI-LD	32.1; 32.2; 32.3; 32.4; 32.5; 32.6; 32.7	MovieSphere Gold; 365BLK; NTD America; Outlaw; Sonlife; Fubo Sports; Jewelry TV	184100	39°53′39.2″N 86°12′20.5″W	
Indianapolis	Indiana	WQDE-LD	33.1; 33.2; 33.3; 33.4; 33.5; 33.6; 33.7	Infomercials; 365BLK; Outlaw; Sports First TV; Defy; Black First TV; Infomercials	184101	39°53′39.2″N 86°12′20.5″W	
Cedar Falls	Iowa	K17MH-D	17.1; 17.2; 17.3; 17.4; 17.5; 17.6; 17.7	Outlaw; Infomercials; Defy; 365BLK; Fubo Sports; Confess; Nosey	188735	42°43′45″N 92°48′41″W	
Cedar Falls	Iowa	KFKZ-LD	35.1; 35.2; 35.3; 35.4; 35.5; 35.6; 35.7	Cozi TV; NBC True CRMZ; 365BLK; Shop LC; Outlaw; Confess; Defy	188737	42°17′17.3″N 91°52′54.5″W	
Des Moines	Iowa	KAJR-LD	36.1; 36.2; 36.3; 36.4; 36.5; 36.6; 36.7	Defy; Sonlife; Outlaw; 365BLK; NTD America; NBC True CRMZ; Oxygen	188743	41°49′4.5″N 93°12′34.5″W	
Des Moines	Iowa	KCYM-LD	44.1; 44.2; 44.3; 44.4; 44.5; 44.6; 44.7	Infomercials; Infomercials; Outlaw; Defy; Infomercials; 365BLK; Shop LC	188745	41°49′4.5″N 93°12′34.5″W	
Des Moines	Iowa	KRPG-LD	43.1; 43.2; 43.3; 43.4; 43.5; 43.6; 43.7	Infomercials; Infomercials; Law & Crime; Outlaw; 365BLK; Fubo Sports; Infomercials	189990	41°49′4.5″N 93°12′35.3″W	
Keokuk	Iowa	K14SU-D	14.1; 14.2; 14.3; 14.4; 14.5; 14.6; 14.7	365BLK; Outlaw; Busted; Confess; Nosey; MovieSphere Gold; Fubo Sports	188731	39°58′19.3″N 91°19′40.4″W	
Pittsburg	Kansas	KPJO-LD	49.1; 49.2; 49.3; 49.4; 49.5; 49.6; 49.7	365BLK; Get; SonLife; Buzzr; Outlaw; Busted; Defy	127415	37°11′30.1″N 94°41′19″W	
Topeka	Kansas	K35KX-D	35.1; 35.2; 35.3; 35.4; 35.5; 35.6; 35.7	Busted; Fubo Sports; Shop LC; Law & Crime; Defy; Cozi TV; NBC True CRMZ	184192	38°48′19.8″N 95°43′3.5″W	
Wichita	Kansas	KFVT-LD	34.1; 34.2; 34.3; 34.4; 34.5; 34.6; 34.7	Sonlife; Get; Jewelry TV; Oxygen; NBC True CRMZ; NTD America; Defy	38217	37°41′13″N 97°20′23″W	
Bowling Green	Kentucky	WCZU-LD	39.1; 39.2; 39.3; 39.4; 39.5; 39.6; 39.7	365BLK; Buzzr; Confess; SonLife; Nosey; Defy; Cozi TV	182670	37°9′18.7″N 86°19′33.2″W	
Elizabethtown	Kentucky	WKUT-LD	25.1; 25.2; 25.3; 25.4; 25.5; 25.6	365BLK; NTD America; Shop LC; Infomercials; Get; Infomercials; Fubo Sports	168485	36°57′37″N 86°32′49″W	(Note: Nominally licensed to Bowling Green, Kentucky.)
Baton Rouge	Louisiana	K27NB-D	43.1; 43.2; 43.3; 43.4; 43.5; 43.6; 43.7	Infomercials; Cozi TV; NBC True CRMZ; Outlaw; Defy; Law & Crime; Fubo Sports	183919	30°21′40.8″N 91°37′52.7″W	(Note: Transmitter is equidistant between Lafayette and Baton Rouge, but reaches neither city.)
Baton Rouge	Louisiana	K29LR-D	47.1; 47.2; 47.3; 47.4; 47.5; 47.6; 47.7	Infomercials; Get; NTD America; Outlaw; Shop LC; Defy; Jewelry TV	184066	30°21′40.8″N 91°37′52.7″W	
Lafayette	Louisiana	K21OM-D	20.1; 20.2; 20.3; 20.4; 20.5; 20.6; 20.7	Infomercials; Get; NTD America; Outlaw; Shop LC; Defy; Jewelry TV	183746	30°10′59.9″N 92°21′49.9″W	(Note: Nominally licensed to Crowley, Louisiana.)
New Orleans	Louisiana	WQDT-LD	33.1; 33.2; 33.3; 33.4; 33.5; 33.6; 33.7	Defy; 365BLK; Shop LC; Fubo Sports; NBC True CRMZ; Cozi TV; Outlaw	187805	29°54′38.6″N 90°11′45.8″W	
New Orleans	Louisiana	WTNO-CD	22.1; 22.2; 22.3; 22.4; 22.5; 22.6; 22.7	Fubo Sports; Jewelry TV; NTD America; Oxygen; NBC True CRMZ; Infomercials; Infomercials	24981	29°58′28.6″N 90°8′36.5″W	
Bangor	Maine	W20ER-D	20.1; 20.2; 20.3; 20.4; 20.5; 20.6; 20.7	365BLK; Defy; Confess; Busted; Nosey; Infomercials; Salem News Channel	187895	44°51′9.8″N 68°47′2.9″W	
Bangor	Maine	W32FS-D	32.1; 32.2; 32.3; 32.4; 32.5; 32.6; 32.7	365BLK; Busted; The First TV; Defy; Confess; Fubo Sports; Nosey	187898	44°51′9.8″N 68°47′2.9″W	
Lake Shore	Maryland	WQAW-LD	69.1; 69.2; 69.3; 69.4; 69.5; 69.6; 69.7; 69.8; 69.9	Game Show Central; Get; Cozi TV; 365BLK; Defy; NBC True CRMZ; Outlaw; Buzzr; Confess	131071	39°0′36.7″N 76°36′31.8″W	
Peabody	Massachusetts	WLEK-LD	22.1; 22.2; 22.3; 22.4; 22.5; 22.6; 22.7	Infomercials; Law & Crime; Shop LC; Jewelry TV; Fubo Sports; NTD America; Infomercials	182343	42°31′53.7″N 70°59′10.4″W	(Note: Nominally licensed to Concord, New Hampshire.)
Detroit	Michigan	WDWO-CD	18.1; 18.2; 18.3; 18.4; 18.5; 18.6; 18.7	Defy; NBC True CRMZ; Oxygen; Magnificent Movies Network; NTD America; 365BLK; Confess by Nosey	68444	42°29′1″N 83°18′44″W	
Detroit	Michigan	WUDL-LD	19.1; 19.2; 19.3; 19.4; 19.5; 19.6; 19.7	Defy; SonLife; Shop LC; MovieSphere Gold; 365BLK; Outlaw; CBN News	67923	42°26′52.5″N 83°10′23.1″W	
Midland	Michigan	WFFC-LD	17.1; 17.2; 17.3; 17.4; 17.5; 17.6; 17.7	Infomercials; Defy; Outlaw; Shop LC; Buzzr; Busted; Infomercials/Timeless TV	184493	43°23′33″N 83°55′27.1″W	
Saginaw	Michigan	W35DQ-D	24.1; 24.2; 24.3; 24.4; 24.5; 24.6; 24.7	NTD America; Infomercials; Busted; Outlaw; NBC True CRMZ; Oxygen; Fubo Sports	184496	43°11′26.8″N 83°46′14.6″W	(Note: Nominally licensed to Midland, Michigan.)
Traverse City	Michigan	W36FH-D	36.1; 36.2; 36.3; 36.4; 36.5; 36.6; 36.7	365BLK; NBC True CRMZ; Oxygen; Outlaw; Defy; Confess; Busted	185195	44°44′58.6″N 85°43′4.7″W	
Minneapolis	Minnesota	K33LN-D	33.1; 33.2; 33.3; 33.4; 33.5; 33.6; 33.7; 33.8	Infomercials; Law & Crime; Fubo Sports; Shop LC; Infomercials; 3ABN; NTD America; [Blank]	67002	44°58′33.85″N 93°16′20.79″W	
Minneapolis	Minnesota	KJNK-LD	25.1; 25.2; 25.3; 25.4; 25.5; 25.6	Telemundo; Sonlife; Cozi TV; NBC True CRMZ; Infomercials; Defy	67955	44°58′34.0″N 93°16′21″W	
Minneapolis	Minnesota	KMBD-LD	43.1; 43.2; 43.3; 43.4; 43.5; 43.6; 43.7	MovieSphere Gold; Defy; Infomercials; The First TV; 365BLK; Outlaw; Infomercials	49177	44°58′34″N 93°16′21″W	
Minneapolis	Minnesota	KMQV-LD	49.1; 49.2; 49.3; 49.4; 49.5; 49.6	Infomercials; MovieSphere Gold; 365BLK; Outlaw; Fubo Sports; Infomercials	184636	44°58′34″N 93°16′21″W	(Note: Nominally licensed to Rochester, Minnesota.)
Minneapolis	Minnesota	KWJM-LD	15.1; 15.2; 15.3; 15.4; 15.5; 15.6; 15.7	MovieSphere Gold; Defy; Outlaw; Jewelry TV; Salem News Channel; Infomercials; 365BLK	184632	44°58′34.0″N 93°16′21″W	
St. Cloud	Minnesota	K28PQ-D	38.1; 38.2; 38.3; 38.4; 38.5; 38.6; 38.7	Infomercials; Infomercials; 365BLK; Outlaw; Defy; Infomercials; Infomercials	184640	45°22′59.6″N 93°42′30.9″W	
Pascagoula	Mississippi	W33EG-D	32.1; 32.2; 32.3; 32.4; 32.5; 32.6; 32.7	Infomercials; Busted; Salem News Channel; Get; Fubo Sports; Defy; Law & Crime	187804	30°32′59.5″N 88°33′23.8″W	(Note: Nominally licensed to Lumberton, Mississippi.)
Columbia	Missouri	K35OY-D	35.1; 35.2; 35.3; 35.4; 35.5; 35.6; 35.7	365BLK; NBC True CRMZ; Oxygen; Outlaw; Defy; MovieSphere Gold; Busted	188048	38°47′54.4″N 92°17′22.4″W	
Eolia	Missouri	WVDM-LD	40.1; 40.2; 40.3; 40.4; 40.5; 40.6; 40.7	365BLK; Outlaw; The First TV; Busted; Defy; Infomercials; Fubo Sports	188767	39°15′53.9″N 91°1′58.4″W	(Note: Nominally licensed to Quincy, Illinois.)
Joplin	Missouri	KRLJ-LD	45.1; 45.2; 45.3; 45.4; 45.5; 45.6; 45.7	Shop LC; Defy; Outlaw; 365BLK; NBC True CRMZ; Oxygen; Busted	186287	37°11′30.1″N 94°41′19″W	
Kansas City	Missouri	KAJF-LD	21.1; 21.2; 21.3; 21.4; 21.5; 21.6; 21.7	Law & Crime; Defy; Sonlife; Shop LC; NBC True CRMZ; Oxygen; Infomercials	184187	39°0′56.5″N 94°30′25″W	
Kansas City	Missouri	KCMN-LD	42.1; 42.2; 42.3; 42.4; 42.5; 42.6; 42.7	MovieSphere Gold; Defy; Movies!; The Nest; The First TV; Infomercials; Law & Crime	184190	39°0′56.5″N 94°30′25″W	(Note: Nominally licensed to Topeka, Kansas.)
Kansas City	Missouri	KQML-LD	46.1; 46.2; 46.3; 46.4; 46.5; 46.6; 46.7	MovieSphere Gold; Defy; Infomercials; Infomercials; Infomercials; Salem News Channel; Fubo Sports	184191	39°0′56.5″N 94°30′25″W	
Springfield	Missouri	KFKY-LD	20.1; 20.2; 20.3; 20.4; 20.5; 20.6; 20.7	365BLK; Nosey; Infomercials; Busted; HSN; Get; Shop LC	186283	37°13′24.8″N 93°14′30.5″W	
Springfield	Missouri	KCNH-LD	47.1; 47.2; 47.3; 47.4; 47.5; 47.6; 47.7	NTD America; NBC True CRMZ; Oxygen; 365BLK; The First TV; Busted; Fubo Sports	186288	37°13′24.8″N 93°14′30.5″W	
St. Louis	Missouri	K25NG-D	25.1; 25.2; 25.4; 25.5; 25.6; 25.7	NTD America; 3ABN; Defy; NBC True CRMZ; Oxygen; Telemundo	190156	38°37′55″N 90°13′59″W	
St. Louis	Missouri	KBGU-LD	33.1; 33.2; 33.3; 33.4; 33.5; 33.6; 33.7	Buzzr; Defy; Shop LC; MovieSphere Gold; Infomercials; Infomercials; Jewelry TV	68055	38°34′27.9″N 90°19′31.9″W	
St. Louis	Missouri	KPTN-LD	7.1; 7.2; 7.3; 7.4; 7.5; 7.6; 7.7	MovieSphere Gold; Sonlife; Fubo Sports; Defy; Infomercials; Salem News Channel; QVC2	35781	38°34′27.9″N 90°19′31.9″W	
St. Louis	Missouri	WODK-LD	45.1; 45.2; 45.3; 45.4; 45.5; 45.6; 45.7	Telemundo; MovieSphere Gold; [Blank]; QVC2; Defy; Fubo Sports; [Blank]	181990	38°34′27.9″N 90°19′31.9″W	
Grand Island	Nebraska	KIUA-LD	15.1; 15.2; 15.3; 15.4; 15.5; 15.6; 15.7	Defy; Salem News Channel; NBC True CRMZ; TeleXitos; Fubo Sports; Infomercials; Busted	183625	40°49′44.8″N 98°0′30.6″W	(Note: Nominally licensed to Lincoln, Nebraska.)
Lincoln	Nebraska	KAJS-LD	33.1; 33.2; 33.3; 33.4; 33.5; 33.6; 33.7	Buzzr; Defy; Law & Crime; NBC True CRMZ; Oxygen; Busted; Nosey	183621	40°04′29.3″N 96°15′24″W	(Note: Transmitter is equidistant between Lincoln and Omaha.)
Omaha	Nebraska	KQMK-LD	25.1; 25.2; 25.3; 25.4; 25.5; 25.6; 25.7	The First TV; NTD America; Fubo Sports; Defy; Busted; Infomercials; Salem News Channel	183619	40°59′48.9″N 96°24′24.5″W	
Las Vegas	Nevada	K36NE-D	43.1; 43.2; 43.3; 43.4; 43.5; 43.6; 43.7; 43.8	3ABN; Moviesphere Gold; Law & Crime; Shop LC; Nosey; Timeless TV; RAV en Español; Hasbro Legends	14302	36°0′35.93″N 115°0′22.96″W	
Las Vegas	Nevada	KEGS-LD	30.1	Timeless TV	168004	35°56′46″N 115°2′37″W	
Las Vegas	Nevada	KHDF-CD	19.1; 19.2; 19.3; 19.4; 19.5; 19.6; 19.7	Moviesphere Gold; NTD America; ESNE TV; Fubo Sports; SonLife; Salem News Channel; Almavision	66807	36°0′27.3″N 115°0′26.9″W	
Las Vegas	Nevada	KNBX-CD	31.1; 31.2; 31.3; 31.4; 31.5; 31.6; 31.7	Moviesphere Gold; QVC 365; Infomercials; Fubo Sports; Aqui TV; Black Vision TV; Magnificent Movies Network	33819	35°56′46″N 115°2′37″W	
Las Vegas	Nevada	KVPX-LD	28.1; 28.2	Defy; CCX Sports	8887	36°6′58.0″N 115°11′11.7″W	
Reno	Nevada	K07AAI-D	12.1; 12.2; 12.3; 12.4; 12.5; 12.6; 12.7	NBC True CRMZ; Oxygen; 365BLK; Busted; Defy; Fubo Sports; Law & Crime	182112	39°12′49.8″N 119°46′13.6″W	
Hammonton	New Jersey	WPSJ-CD	8.1; 8.2; 8.3; 8.4; 8.5; 8.6	Visión Latina; LATV; ULFN; Defy; Infomercials; [Blank]	167543	39°43′40.6″N 74°50′39.4″W	
Albuquerque	New Mexico	KQDF-LD	25.1; 25.2; 25.3; 25.4; 25.5; 25.6; 25.7	Jewelry TV Español; 365BLK; Defy; Outlaw; Shop LC; Busted; Infomercials	32283	35°12′49.8″N 106°27′3.3″W	(Note: Nominally licensed to Santa Fe, New Mexico.)
Albuquerque	New Mexico	KWPL-LD	45.1; 45.2; 45.3; 45.4; 45.5; 45.6; 45.7	Busted; Outlaw; Infomercials; Law & Crime; 365BLK; Defy; Fubo Sports	183558	35°4′3.9″N 106°46′48.5″W	(Note: Nominally licensed to Santa Fe, New Mexico.)
New York City	New York	W02CY-D	45.1; 45.2; 45.3; 45.4; 45.5; 45.6; 45.7; 45.8; 45.9	Defy; The First TV; Sonlife; Infomercials; Shop LC; Infomercials; Salem News Channel; Infomercials; Fubo Sports	130477	40°45′8.1″N 73°58′2.1″W	
New York City	New York	WKOB-LD	42.1; 42.2; 42.3	Visión Latina; ULFN; Law & Crime	51441	40°42′46.8″N 74°0′47.3″W	
Olean	New York	WVTT-CD	34.1; 34.2; 34.3; 34.4; 34.5; 34.6; 34.7	Defy; NTD America; Shop LC; 365BLK; Outlaw; NBC True CRMZ; Oxygen	10869	42°04′50.00″N 78°25′50.00″W	
Olean	New York	WWHC-LD	20.1; 20.2; 20.3; 20.4; 20.5; 20.6; 20.7	Confess; Shop LC; Defy; 365BLK; Outlaw; Infomercials; Fubo Sports	10868	42°04′50.00″N 78°25′50.00″W	
Rochester	New York	WGCE-CD	6.1; 6.2; 6.3; 6.4; 6.5; 6.6; 6.7; 6.8; 6.9; 6.10	365BLK; Outlaw; Get; Cozi TV; Buzzr; NBC True CRMZ; Busted; Defy; Confess; Nosey	58739	43°8′5.5″N 77°35′5.7″W	
Charlotte	North Carolina	W15EB-D	21.1; 21.2; 21.3; 21.4; 21.5; 21.6; 21.7; 21.8	Defy; Infomercials; NBC True CRMZ; TeleXitos; NTD America; Outlaw; Sonlife; ShopHQ	67022	35°11′56.3″N 80°52′35.7″W	
Charlotte	North Carolina	WVEB-LD	22.1; 22.2; 22.3; 22.4; 22.5; 22.6; 22.7	Fubo Sports; Infomercials; Infomercials; Defy; Shop LC; Outlaw; 365BLK	182013	35°11′56.3″N 80°52′35.7″W	(Note: Nominally licensed to Florence, South Carolina.)
Charlotte	North Carolina	WHEH-LD	41.1; 41.2; 41.3; 41.4; 41.5; 41.6; 41.7	COZI TV; NBC True CRMZ; TeleXitos; Buzzr; Defy; 365BLK; Outlaw	184549	35°15′5.5″N 80°41′11.2″W	(Note: Nominally licensed to Lumberton, North Carolina.)
Fayetteville	North Carolina	WIRP-LD	27.1; 27.2; 27.3; 27.4; 27.5; 27.6; 27.7; 27.8	Infomercials; 365BLK; NTD America; Defy; Infomercials; Shop LC; Outlaw; [Blank]	183631	35°52′15.7″N 79°9′39″W	
Fayetteville	North Carolina	WNCB-LD	16.1; 16.2; 16.3; 16.4; 16.5; 16.6; 16.7	Law & Crime; Buzzr; Sonlife; Defy; 365BLK; Outlaw; Shop LC	183629	35°2′44.4″N 78°58′52.1″W	
Greenville	North Carolina	W35DW-D	45.1; 45.2; 45.3; 45.4; 45.5; 45.6; 45.7	MovieSphere Gold; Infomercials; Infomercials; Fubo Sports; Infomercials; Infomercials; Aqui TV	184554	35°26′42.6″N 77°22′7.1″W	
Wilmington	North Carolina	WQDH-LD	49.1; 49.2; 49.3; 49.4; 49.5; 49.6; 49.7	Shop LC; Get; MovieSphere Gold; NBC True CRMZ; TeleXitos; Outlaw; Jewelry TV	182080	34°10′52.2″N 77°55′48.9″W	
Fargo	North Dakota	K15MR-D	15.1; 15.2; 15.3; 15.4; 15.5; 15.6; 15.7; 15.8	NBC True CRMZ; Oxygen; Outlaw; Busted; Salem News Channel; Defy; Law & Crime; MovieSphere Gold	188045	46°51′24.4″N 96°44′26.7″W	
Cleveland	Ohio	KONV-LD	28.1; 28.2; 28.3; 28.4; 28.5; 28.6; 28.7	Sports First TV; Defy; Infomercials; Hasbro Legends; QVC2; Outlaw; Salem News Channel	184284	41°29′13.2″N 81°41′1.1″W	(Note: Nominally licensed to Canton, Ohio.)
Cleveland	Ohio	WEKA-LD	41.1; 41.2; 41.3; 41.4; 41.5; 41.6; 41.7	Infomercials; Infomercials; SonLife; Law & Crime; Fubo Sports; Defy; Outlaw	184644	41°29′13.2″N 81°41′1.1″W	
Cleveland	Ohio	WQDI-LD	20.1; 20.2; 20.3; 20.4; 20.5; 20.6; 20.7	Infomercials; Defy; Infomercials; Outlaw; QVC2; Infomercials; Salem News Channel	184283	41°29′13.2″N 81°41′1.1″W	
Cleveland	Ohio	WUEK-LD	26.1; 26.2; 26.3; 26.4; 26.5; 26.6; 26.7	Infomercials; NTD America; Defy; Shop LC; Infomercials; TeleXitos; NBC True CRMZ	184643	41°29′13.2″N 81°41′1.1″W	
Columbus	Ohio	WDEM-CD	17.1; 17.2; 17.3; 17.4; 17.5; 17.6; 17.7; 17.8; 17.9	RESN; Oxygen; NBC True CRMZ; 365BLK; Defy; Outlaw; NTD America; ShopHQ; Fubo Sports	54414	39°58′16.0″N 83°1′40.0″W	
Enid	Oklahoma	KBZC-LD	42.1; 42.2; 42.3; 42.4; 42.5; 42.6; 42.7	Confess; Infomercials; Buzzr; Outlaw; [Blank]; 365BLK; Shop LC	188841	35°44′22.8″N 97°29′1.8″W	
Enid	Oklahoma	KUOC-LD	48.1; 48.2; 48.3; 48.4; 48.5; 48.6; 48.7	Confess; SonLife; Fubo Sports; Outlaw; 365BLK; Nosey; Defy	188842	35°59′48.1″N 97°54′29″W	
Oklahoma City	Oklahoma	KOHC-CD	45.1; 45.2; 45.3; 45.4; 45.5; 45.6; 45.7	Fubo Sports; Infomercials; Outlaw; 365BLK; NTD America; ShopHQ; Defy	10265	35°21′46.00″N 97°26′57.00″W	
Oklahoma City	Oklahoma	KTOU-LD	22.1; 22.2; 22.3; 22.4; 22.5; 22.6; 22.7	Infomercials; Sonlife; Defy; NBC True CRMZ; Oxygen; Fubo Sports; Jewelry TV	28186	35°23′14″N 97°29′57″W	
Tulsa	Oklahoma	KZLL-LD	39.1; 39.2; 39.3; 39.4; 39.5; 39.6; 39.7	NTD America; Defy; Outlaw; Shop LC; NBC True CRMZ; Oxygen; 365BLK	186286	36°7′52″N 96°4′14″W	
Eugene	Oregon	K06QR-D	41.1; 41.2; 41.3; 41.4; 41.5; 41.6; 41.7	365BLK; Outlaw; The First TV; Busted; Infomercials; Fubo Sports; Infomercials	181635	44°0′7″N 123°6′54″W	
Eugene	Oregon	KORY-CD	15.1; 15.2; 15.3; 15.4; 15.5; 15.6; 15.7	365BLK; Cozi TV; Outlaw; Defy; NTD America; Busted; Salem News Channel	71070	44°0′7″N 123°6′54″W	
Portland	Oregon	KOXI-CD	20.1; 20.2; 20.3; 20.4; 20.5; 20.6; 20.7; 20.8; 20.9	Salem News Channel; Fubo Sports; Buzzr; NTD America; Oxygen; NBC True CRMZ; 365BLK; Jewelry TV; Shop LC	71074	45°31′20.5″N 122°44′49.5″W	
Butler	Pennsylvania	WJMB-CD	60.1; 60.2; 60.3; 60.4; 60.5; 60.6; 60.7	NBC True CRMZ; Oxygen; Salem News Channel; 365BLK; Infomercials; Defy; Outlaw	68393	40°55′34″N 79°53′37″W	
Kittanning	Pennsylvania	WKHU-CD	60.1; 60.2; 60.3; 60.4; 60.5; 60.6; 60.7	NBC True CRMZ; Oxygen; Defy; 365BLK; Outlaw; Infomercials; Infomercials	68401	40°47′18.5″N 79°32′4.5″W	
Philadelphia	Pennsylvania	W25FG-D	36.1; 36.2; 36.3; 36.4; 36.5; 36.6; 36.7	Infomercials; Salem News Channel; Infomercials; The First TV; Infomercials; Aqui TV; Defy	72535	40°2′30.1″N 75°14′10.1″W	
Philadelphia	Pennsylvania	WDUM-LD	41.1; 41.2; 41.3; 41.4; 41.5; 41.6; 41.7	Law & Crime; Infomercials; Defy; Infomercials; Fubo Sports; Infomercials; Infomercials	19586	40°02′30″N 75°14′11″W	
Philadelphia	Pennsylvania	WZPA-LD	33.1; 33.2; 33.3; 33.4; 33.5; 33.6; 33.7	NTD America; Defy; SonLife; Shop LC; Infomercials; Infomercials; Infomercials	72536	40°02′26.6″N 75°14′11.4″W	
Pittsburgh	Pennsylvania	WMVH-CD	26.1; 26.2; 26.3; 26.4; 26.5; 26.6; 26.7	Timeless TV; NBC True CRMZ; Oxygen; Law & Crime; Shop LC; 365BLK; Outlaw	68394	40°7′24″N 79°53′44″W	(Note: Nominally licensed to Charleroi, Pennsylvania.)
Pittsburgh	Pennsylvania	WWKH-CD	35.1; 35.2; 35.3; 35.4; 35.5; 35.6; 35.7	Fubo Sports; NBC True CRMZ; Oxygen; 365BLK; Infomercials; Outlaw; Defy	68409	39°51′16.5″N 79°39′20.9″W	(Note: Nominally licensed to Uniontown, Pennsylvania.)
Uniontown	Pennsylvania	WWLM-CD	20.1; 20.2; 20.3; 20.4; 20.5; 20.6; 20.7; 20.8; 20.9; 20.10; 20.11; 20.12	Infomercials; NBC True CRMZ; Oxygen; Law & Crime; Shop LC; 365BLK; Outlaw; Confess; Infomercials; Infomercials; Infomercials; Infomercials	267	40°11′24″N 80°13′55″W	
Mayagüez	Puerto Rico	W27DZ-D	51.1; 51.2; 51.3; 51.4; 51.5; 51.6	Aqui TV; Infomercials; Infomercials; Aqui TV; Infomercials; Infomercials	125245	18°13′39.1″N 67°6′35.2″W	
Mayagüez	Puerto Rico	WOST	14.1; 14.2; 14.3; 14.4; 14.5; 14.6	Aqui TV; Infomercials; Infomercials; Aqui TV; Infomercials; Infomercials	60357	18°18′51″N 67°11′24″W	
Ponce	Puerto Rico	WQQZ-CD	14.1; 14.2; 14.3; 14.4; 14.5; 14.6	Aqui TV; Infomercials; Infomercials; Aqui TV; Infomercials; Infomercials	32142	18°4′38.8″N 66°45′1.6″W	
Quebradillas	Puerto Rico	WWKQ-LD	19.1; 19.2; 19.3; 19.4; 19.5; 19.6	Aqui TV; Infomercials; Infomercials; Aqui TV; Infomercials; Infomercials	60369	18°28′45.7″N 66°55′34.6″W	
San Juan	Puerto Rico	W20EJ-D	26.1; 26.2; 26.3; 26.4; 26.5; 26.6; 26.7	Salem News Channel; Infomercials; The First TV; Infomercials; Infomercials; Infomercials; Infomercials	125192	18°16′25″N 66°5′40″W	
Charleston	South Carolina	WBSE-LD	20.1; 20.2; 20.3; 20.4; 20.5; 20.6; 20.7; 20.8	Jewelry TV; Get; Outlaw; Cozi TV; NBC True CRMZ; Defy; Fubo Sports; Busted	67969	32°49′3.3″N 79°50′5.6″W	
Florence	South Carolina	W33DN-D	16.1; 16.2; 16.3; 16.4; 16.5; 16.6; 16.7	Outlaw; NBC True CRMZ; Oxygen; Defy; Busted; Salem News Channel; Law & Crime	182023	34°21′42.6″N 79°45′5.3″W	
Chattanooga	Tennessee	WYHB-CD	39.1; 39.2; 39.3; 39.4; 39.5; 39.6; 39.7; 39.8; 39.9; 39.10	365BLK; Outlaw; Get; Start TV; Defy; Cozi TV; NBC True CRMZ; Fubo Sports; Shop LC; Busted	167588	35°12′36″N 85°16′42.3″W	
Jackson	Tennessee	WYJJ-LD	27.1; 27.2; 27.3; 27.4; 27.5; 27.6; 27.7; 27.8	365BLK; Outlaw; Get; Sonlife; Defy; NBC True CRMZ; Cozi TV; Busted	188036	35°38′49.1″N 88°50′0.2″W	
Memphis	Tennessee	KPMF-LD	26.1; 26.2; 26.3; 26.4; 26.5; 26.6; 26.7	NBC True CRMZ; TeleXitos; Jewelry TV; Buzzr; SonLife; Law & Crime; Outlaw	188801	35°16′33″N 89°46′38″W	
Memphis	Tennessee	W15EA-D	42.1; 42.2; 42.3; 42.4; 42.5; 42.6; 42.7	3ABN; NTD America; Infomercials; The First TV; Infomercials; Fubo Sports; Outlaw	168014	35°16′33″N 89°46′38″W	
Memphis	Tennessee	WPED-LD	19.1; 19.2; 19.3; 19.4; 19.5; 19.6; 19.7	Infomercials; Infomercials; Law & Crime; Aqui TV; Salem News Channel; Outlaw; Infomercials	188067	34°59′22″N 89°51′45″W	
Memphis	Tennessee	WQEK-LD	36.1; 36.2; 36.3; 36.4; 36.5; 36.6; 36.7	Infomercials; Infomercials; Fubo Sports; Roar; Infomercials; Shop LC; Outlaw	188791	35°16′33″N 89°47′38″W	
Memphis	Tennessee	WQEO-LD	49.1; 49.2; 49.3; 49.4; 49.5; 49.6; 49.7	Infomercials; Infomercials; Infomercials; Aqui TV; Infomercials; Outlaw; Infomercials	188824	35°16′33″N 89°46′38″W	
Nashville	Tennessee	WCTZ-LD	35.1; 35.2; 35.3; 35.4; 35.5; 35.6; 35.7; 35.8	Buzzr; Shop LC; Outlaw; Defy; [Blank]; CBN News; NBC True CRMZ; TeleXitos	182481	36°16′4.9″N 86°47′44.7″W	(Note: Nominally licensed to Bowling Green, Kentucky.)
Nashville	Tennessee	WKUW-LD	40.1; 40.2; 40.3; 40.4; 40.5; 40.6; 40.7	Law & Crime; Defy; 365BLK; Confess; Nosey; Outlaw; Fubo Sports	128934	36°16′4.9″N 86°47′44.7″W	(Note: Nominally licensed to White House, Tennessee.)
Amarillo	Texas	KAUO-LD	15.1; 15.2; 15.3; 15.4; 15.5; 15.6; 15.7; 15.8	Confess; Get; MovieSphere Gold; 365BLK; Nosey; Fubo Sports; [Blank]; Defy	181600	35°10′20.8″N 101°57′13.3″W	
Amarillo	Texas	KLKW-LD	22.1; 22.2; 22.3; 22.4; 22.5; 22.6; 22.7	Estrella TV; Shop LC; SonLife; Buzzr; NBC True CRMZ; TeleXitos; 365BLK	188769	35°10′21″N 101°57′13″W	
Austin	Texas	KGBS-CD	19.1; 19.2; 19.3; 19.4; 19.5; 19.6; 19.7	Roar; Comet; Charge!; Defy; Jewelry TV Español; Sonlife; Advenimiento TV	38562	30°19′23.8″N 97°47′59.5″W	
Austin	Texas	KVAT-LD	17.1; 17.2; 17.3; 17.4; 17.5; 17.6; 17.7; 17.8; 17.9; 17.11; 17.12	Fubo Sports; LATV; Sonlife; Heroes & Icons; 365BLK; Defy; Start TV; Oxygen; NBC True CRMZ; Blank; Blank	52930	30°19′23.8″N 97°47′59.5″W	
Brownsville	Texas	KNWS-LD	64.1; 64.2; 64.3; 64.4; 64.5; 64.6; 64.7	Salem News Channel; Outlaw; Buzzr; Daystar Español; 365BLK; Defy; Busted	3265	26°9′1.5″N 97°30′58.7″W	
College Station	Texas	KZCZ-LD	34.1; 34.2; 34.3; 34.4; 34.5; 34.6; 34.7	Daystar; MovieSphere Gold; Shop LC; 365BLK; Buzzr; Sonlife; Daystar Español	188770	31°18′45.3″N 97°15′26.8″W	
Corpus Christi	Texas	K21OC-D	54.1; 54.2; 54.3; 54.4; 54.5; 54.6	Infomercials; Estrella TV; Buzzr; NBC True CRMZ; Oxygen; Outlaw	125079	27°47′27.5″N 97°27′2.5″W	
Corpus Christi	Texas	K32OC-D	29.1; 29.2; 29.3; 29.4; 29.5; 29.6; 29.7	MovieSphere Gold; 365BLK; Outlaw; SonLife; [Blank]; NBC True CRMZ; Oxygen	167450	27°47′27.5″N 97°27′2.5″W	
Corpus Christi	Texas	KCCX-LD	24.1; 24.2; 24.3; 24.4; 24.5; 24.6; 25.7	Defy; [Blank]; Daystar; Daystar Español; Outlaw; HSN2; 365BLK	68454	27°47′27.5″N 97°27′2.5″W	
Corpus Christi	Texas	KYDF-LD	34.1; 34.2; 34.3; 34.4; 34.5; 34.6; 34.7	MovieSphere Gold; Fubo Sports; Defy; Infomercials; Shop LC; Law & Crime; Infomercials	131347	27°47′27.5″N 97°27′2.5″W	
Dallas–Fort Worth	Texas	K07AAD-D	31.1; 31.2; 31.3; 31.4; 31.5; 31.6	Infomercials; Infomercials; 365BLK; Fubo Sports; Outlaw; Defy	52923	32°44′20.1″N 97°5′29.8″W	
Dallas–Fort Worth	Texas	KHPK-LD	28.1; 28.2; 28.3; 28.4; 28.5; 28.6	Shop LC; LATV; Defy; 365BLK; Outlaw; Independent	52926	32°35′22″N 96°58′12.9″W	(Note: Nominally licensed to DeSoto, Texas.)
Dallas–Fort Worth	Texas	KJJM-LD	34.1; 34.2; 34.3; 34.4; 34.5; 34.6; 34.7	Infomercials; Shop LC; The First TV; Defy; 365BLK; [Blank]; Outlaw	26957	32°44′22.70″N 97°6′43.50″W	(Note: Nominally licensed to Mesquite, Texas.)
Dallas–Fort Worth	Texas	KNAV-LD	22.1; 22.2; 22.3; 22.4; 22.5; 22.6; 22.7	LATV; Infomercials; Infomercials; Infomercials; Law & Crime; 365BLK; Outlaw	47898	32°35′22″N 96°58′12.9″W	
Dallas–Fort Worth	Texas	KODF-LD	26.1; 26.2; 26.3; 26.4; 26.5; 26.7	Infomercials; 365BLK; Infomercials; Defy; Sonlife; Outlaw	52925	32°35′27″N 96°57′48.8″W	
Dallas–Fort Worth	Texas	KPFW-LD	18.1; 18.2; 18.3; 18.4; 18.5; 18.6	Infomercials; Salem News Channel; Infomercials; 365BLK; Outlaw; Shop LC	127891	32°44′20.1″N 97°5′29.8″W	
Houston	Texas	KBMN-LD	40.1; 40.2; 40.3; 40.4; 40.5; 40.6; 40.7	The First TV; Law & Crime; 365BLK; Law & Crime; Infomercials; Outlaw; Defy	188068	29°48′6.2″N 95°14′3.8″W	
Houston	Texas	KEHO-LD	32.1; 32.2; 32.3; 32.4; 32.5; 32.6; 32.7	Infomercials; Fubo Sports; Defy; 365BLK; Infomercials; Shop LC; Outlaw	130156	29°48′6.2″N 95°14′3.8″W	
Houston	Texas	KUGB-CD	28.1; 28.2; 28.3; 28.4; 28.5; 28.6; 28.7	ULFN; Infomercials; Shop LC; 365BLK; Outlaw; Defy; [Blank]	66790	29°34′16″N 95°30′38″W	
Houston	Texas	KUVM-LD	10.1; 10.2; 10.3; 10.4	Defy; Sonlife; 365BLK; Outlaw	167664	29°33′45.2″N 95°30′35.9″W	
Lubbock	Texas	K32OV-D	24.1; 24.2; 24.3; 24.4; 24.5; 24.6; 24.7	365BLK; Confess; Defy; Nosey; Fubo Sports; Infomercials; Infomercials	129704	33°30′57.8″N 101°50′55.9″W	
Lubbock	Texas	KNKC-LD	29.1; 29.2; 29.3; 29.4; 29.5; 29.6; 29.7	Fubo Sports; Sonlife; Get; Oxygen; NBC True CRMZ; Daystar Español; Buzzr	183611	33°32′30″N 101°49′18″W	
McAllen	Texas	KAZH-LD	57.1; 57.2; 57.3; 57.4; 57.5; 57.6; 57.7	365BLK; Outlaw; Defy; Game Show Central; Jewelry TV Español; Law & Crime; Fubo Sports	68574	26°15′25.3″N 98°13′54.5″W	
McAllen	Texas	KRZG-CD	35.1; 35.2; 35.3; 35.4; 35.5; 35.6; 35.7; 35.8; 35.9	Daystar; SonLife; NTD America; Busted; "Hope TV"; Daystar Español; Majestad TV; [Blank]; [Blank]	32176	26°16′2.2″N 98°19′11.8″W	
Missouri City	Texas	KUVM-CD	34.1; 34.2; 34.3; 34.4; 34.5; 34.6; 34.7	LATV; NTD America; Infomercials; Defy; 365BLK; Outlaw; Salem News Channel	13200	29°33′45.2″N 95°30′35.9″W	
San Antonio	Texas	K17MJ-D	51.1; 51.2; 51.3; 51.4; 51.5; 51.6; 51.7; 51.8	Infomercials; Infomercials; Advenimiento TV; Infomercials; Outlaw; Infomercials; 365BLK; [Blank]	2555	29°26′29.9″N 98°30′22.8″W	
San Antonio	Texas	K25OB-D	27.1; 27.2; 27.3; 27.4; 27.5; 27.6; 27.7	NTD America; Outlaw; 3ABN; Defy; 365BLK; Jewelry TV; Jewelry TV Español	24570	29°16′29.8″N 98°15′53″W	
San Antonio	Texas	KISA-LD	40.1; 40.2; 40.3; 40.4; 40.5; 40.6; 40.7	QVC; LATV; Defy; Sonlife; Shop LC; Outlaw; 365BLK	58786	29°26′29.9″N 98°30′22.8″W	
San Antonio	Texas	KOBS-LD	19.1; 19.2; 19.3; 19.4; 19.5; 19.6; 19.7	Infomercials; Infomercials; Shop LC; Fubo Sports; Defy; Outlaw; 365BLK	11701	29°46′4.7″N 98°14′36.1″W	
San Antonio	Texas	KSAA-LD	28.1; 28.2; 28.3; 28.4; 28.5; 28.6; 28.7	Infomercials; Law & Crime; Defy; Infomercials; Outlaw; Infomercials; 365BLK	20566	29°26′29.9″N 98°30′22.8″W	
San Antonio	Texas	KSSJ-LD	47.1; 47.2; 47.3; 47.4; 47.5; 47.6; 47.7	Infomercials; Defy; Infomercials; Outlaw; 365BLK; Fubo Sports; Infomercials	67304	29°26′29.9″N 98°30′22.8″W	
San Antonio	Texas	KVDF-CD	31.1; 31.2; 31.3; 31.4; 31.5; 31.6	Infomercials; Infomercials; Defy; Aqui TV; Outlaw; 365BLK	60464	29°26′29.9″N 98°30′22.8″W	
Tyler	Texas	KBJE-LD	29.1; 29.2; 29.3; 29.4; 29.5; 29.6; 29.7	Shop LC; Defy; Infomercials; Law & Crime; Infomercials; Infomercials; Infomercials	182590	32°15′34″N 95°22′4″W	
Tyler	Texas	KCEB	54.1; 54.2; 54.3	Fubo Sports; Outlaw; Infomercials	83913	32°27′15.7″N 95°7′50.3″W	(Note: KCEB (licensed to Longview, Texas) is a full-service TV station hosted by the low-power KPKN-LD.)
Tyler	Texas	KDKJ-LD	27.1; 27.2; 27.3; 27.4; 27.5; 27.6; 27.7	Jewelry TV Español; Estrella TV; Get; NTD America; Heroes & Icons; Defy; Salem News Channel	182588	32°15′34″N 95°22′4″W	
Tyler	Texas	KKPD-LD	30.1; 30.2; 30.3; 30.4; 30.5; 30.6; 30.7	QVC2; Outlaw; Defy; Fubo Sports; Infomercials; Infomercials; Infomercials	182592	32°15′34″N 95°22′4″W	
Tyler	Texas	KPKN-LD	33.1; 33.2; 33.3; 33.4; 33.5; 33.6; 33.7	Buzzr; Defy; [Blank]; Infomercials; Cozi TV; NBC True CRMZ; Jewelry TV	182593	32°27′15.7″N 95°7′50.3″W	
Waco	Texas	KAXW-LD	35.1; 35.2; 35.3; 35.4; 35.5; 35.6; 35.7	365BLK; Infomercials; NBC True CRMZ; TeleXitos; CBN News; Law & Crime; Fubo Sports	52928	31°18′45.3″N 97°15′26.8″W	
Salt Lake City	Utah	KBTU-LD	23.1; 23.2; 23.3; 23.4; 23.5; 23.6; 23.7	Infomercials; Sonlife; NTD America; Fubo Sports; 365BLK; Shop LC; Infomercials	125589	40°40′55.7″N 112°12′11.5″W	
Richmond	Virginia	WFWG-LD	30.1; 30.2; 30.3; 30.4; 30.5; 30.6; 30.7	Jewelry TV; MovieSphere Gold; Get; Defy; Infomercials; Fubo Sports; Infomercials	182308	37°30′45.6″N 77°36′4.8″W	
Richmond	Virginia	WUDW-LD	53.1; 53.2; 53.3; 53.4; 53.5; 53.6; 53.7	Buzzr; MovieSphere Gold; ULFN; Shop LC; NTD America; Infomercials; [Blank]	182288	37°30′45.6″N 77°36′4.8″W	
Richmond	Virginia	WWBK-LD	28.1; 28.2; 28.3; 28.4; 28.5; 28.6; 28.7	MeTV Toons; Defy; MovieSphere Gold; Infomercials; Fubo Sports; Salem News Channel; Infomercials	190695	37°30′45.6″N 77°36′4.8″W	
Pasco	Washington	K28QK-D	22.1; 22.2; 22.3; 22.4; 22.5; 22.6; 22.7	NBC True CRMZ; Oxygen; 365BLK; Outlaw; Fubo Sports; Defy; Busted	188578	46°6′54.6″N 119°1′35.1″W	
Seattle	Washington	KUSE-LD	46.1; 46.2; 46.3; 46.4; 46.5; 46.6; 46.7; 46.8; 46.9	Infomercials; Defy; SonLife; Shop LC; Oxygen; NBC True CRMZ; Outlaw; Infomercials; Fubo Sports	168057	47°30′16.3″N 121°58′10″W	
Walla Walla	Washington	K33EJ-D	33.1; 33.2; 33.3; 33.4; 33.5; 33.6; 33.7	365BLK; Outlaw; Defy; Busted; 3ABN; Confess; Nosey	17399	45°59′3.4″N 118°10′11.8″W	
Charleston	West Virginia	WOCW-LD	21.1; 21.2; 21.3; 21.4; 21.5; 21.6; 21.7	Salem News Channel; NTD America; Get; Defy; Shop LC; NBC True CRMZ; Oxygen	25792	38°28′11.9″N 81°46′35.2″W	
Eau Claire	Wisconsin	W23FC-D	53.1; 53.2; 53.3; 53.4; 53.5; 53.6	365BLK; Confess; Nosey; Defy; Fubo Sports; Salem News Channel	184443	44°52′58.5″N 91°35′13.5″W	
Green Bay	Wisconsin	WGBD-LD	49.1 49.2 49.3 49.4 49.5 49.6 49.7	Fubo Sports Law & Crime Daystar Daystar Espanol Infomercials Infomercials Infomercials			
Madison	Wisconsin	W23BW-D	23.1; 23.2; 23.3; 23.4; 23.5; 23.6; 23.7	Busted; Buzzr; Defy; NTD America; 3ABN; NBC True CRMZ; Oxygen	67000	43°3′9.01″N 89°28′42.44″W	
Madison	Wisconsin	WZCK-LD	8.1; 8.2; 8.3; 8.4; 8.5; 8.6; 8.7	Salem News Channel; Get; Sonlife; Busted; Shop LC; Defy; Law & Crime	26603	43°3′9″N 89°28′36″W	
Milwaukee	Wisconsin	WTSJ-LD	38.1; 38.2; 38.3; 38.4; 38.5; 38.6; 38.7; 38.8; 38.9	Fubo Sports; Buzzr; Infomericals; Shop LC; NBC True CRMZ; TeleXitos; Jewelry TV; 365BLK; Defy	56213	43°05′46.2″N 87°54′15″W	

== Former stations ==
Media market	State	Station	Facility ID	Divested	Notes
Enterprise	Alabama	W46EJ-D	187829	2016	(Note: Licensed in 2009 but unbuilt.)
Enterprise	Alabama	WGEI-LD	187828	2016	(Note: Licensed in 2010 but unbuilt.)
Hot Springs	Arkansas	KQPS-LD	188820	2021	(Note: License cancelled June 1, 2021.)
Jonesboro	Arkansas	K30MF-D	187270	2020	(Note: License cancelled August 24, 2020.)
Gainesville	Florida	W24DM-D	182304	2020	(Note: License cancelled October 2, 2020.)
Ocala	Florida	WNDS-LD	187643	2017	(Note: License cancelled November 16, 2017.)
Panama City	Florida	W16DX-D	182839	2016	
Panama City	Florida	WIDM-LD	182841	2016	
Tallahassee	Florida	WDDM-LD	182471	2020	(Note: License cancelled September 21, 2020.)
Augusta	Georgia	WCZC-LD	181845	2020	
Augusta	Georgia	WDMN-LD	184020	2019	
Augusta	Georgia	WQEP-LD	181849	2020	
Augusta	Georgia	WDYH-LD	181850	2020	(Note: License cancelled December 15, 2020.)
Macon	Georgia	WDYI-LD	181998	2020	
Champaign	Illinois	W34EH-D	184765	2020	
Champaign	Illinois	WFDE-LD	184763	2020	
Jacksonville	Illinois	W24EV-D	188752	2021	
Peoria	Illinois	WDLF-LD	183633	2020	
Peoria	Illinois	WKMH-LD	183634	2020	
Rockford	Illinois	W22EE-D	183744	2016	(Note: Licensed in 2011 but unbuilt.)
Rockford	Illinois	WODF-LD	183592	2020	(Note: License cancelled May 20, 2020.)
Springfield	Illinois	WBDI-LD	181968	2020	
Evansville	Indiana	W27DH-D	181945	2020	
Evansville	Indiana	WUCU-LD	181949	2020	
Lafayette	Indiana	WECY-LD	184197	2018	
Marion	Indiana	WCZA-LD	184280	2020	
Cedar Falls	Iowa	KBBA-LD	188733	2020	
Cedar Falls	Iowa	KMIK-LD	188736	2020	
Davenport	Iowa	WUEB-LD	183591	2020	
Iowa City	Iowa	KWKB	35096	2021	
Ottumwa	Iowa	KGLU-LD	188726	2020	(Note: A 2018 purchase attempt by Roseland Broadcasting (with Bahakel Communications operating via an SSA) failed to be consummated.)
Sioux City	Iowa	KEJK-LD	184681	2020	
Bowling Green	Kentucky	W14DG-D	182477	2016	(Note: Licensed in 2009 and signed on earlier that year.)
Flint	Michigan	WFKB-LD	184495	2020	
Midland	Michigan	WIEK-LD	184509	2020	
Rochester	Minnesota	KILW-LD	184634	2020	
Lincoln	Nebraska	KJII-LD	183626	2020	
Lincoln	Nebraska	KIJK-LD	183628	2020	
Lincoln	Nebraska	KBLI-LD	183620	2020	
Lincoln	Nebraska	KQLD-LD	183627	2020	
Santa Fe	New Mexico	KAOE-LD	183550	2021	
Watertown	New York	W45EI-D	188838	2016	(Note: Licensed in 2015 but unbuilt.)
Wilmington	North Carolina	WADA-LD	182078	2020	(Note: License cancelled December 1, 2020.)
Bismarck	North Dakota	K15MQ-D	185742	2021	
Enid	Oklahoma	KZMB-LD	188840	2020	
Charleston	South Carolina	WCYD-LD	182494	2020	
Florence	South Carolina	WLDW-LD	182006	2020	
College Station	Texas	K49LC-D	182059	2016	
Sherman	Texas	K31LQ-D	184857	2016	
Wausau	Wisconsin	WWEA-LD	187397	2020	
Wausau	Wisconsin	WEHG-LD	184337	2020	
