= List of Azteca América affiliates =

The following is a list of affiliates for the American Spanish language television network Azteca América, which was in operation from July 28, 2001, to December 31, 2022.

== Affiliates ==
Final Azteca América Affiliates
Media market	State/Territory	Station	Channel	Affiliated	Disaffiliated	Notes
Redding	California	KRHT-LD	41	2007	Replacement TBD	
Naples	Florida	WANA-LD	16	2019	Replacement TBD	

Former Azteca América affiliates
Media market	State/Territory	Station	Channel	Affiliated	Disaffiliated	Notes
Montgomery	Alabama	WWBH-LD	36	2018	2023	
Mobile	Alabama	WEDS-LD	29	2018	2023	
Mobile	Alabama	WWBH-LD	28	2018	2022	
Huntsville	Alabama	WYAM-LD	51.2	2014	2023	
Kingman	Arizona	KMOH-TV	6	2018	2021	
Phoenix	Arizona	KEJR-LD	40	2018	2022	
Tucson	Arizona	KUDF-LP	14	2005	2022	
Yuma	Arizona	KVYE	7.2	2017	2023	
Bentonville−Rogers	Arkansas	K28NT-D	48.2	2014	2023	
Little Rock	Arkansas	K23OW-D	38	2018	2023	
Little Rock	Arkansas	KWMO-LD	34	2018	2023	
Bakersfield	California	KXBF-LD	14.5	2017	2021	
Palm Springs	California	KAKZ-LD	4.3	2002	2023	
Fresno	California	KFAZ-CA	8	2002	2020	(Note: Repeater of KMSG-LD.)
Fresno	California	KMSG-LD	43.2	2002	2023	
Los Angeles	California	KAZA-TV	54	2001	2018	
Los Angeles	California	KJLA	57	2018	2021	
Los Angeles	California	KWHY-TV	22.2	2022	2022	
Monterey	California	KBIT-LD	43	2002	2022	
Palm Springs	California	KYAV-LP	12	—N/a	—N/a	
Redding−Chico	California	KRHT-LD	41	2007	2023	
Sacramento	California	KSAO-LD	49	2016	2022	
San Diego	California	KZSD-LP	41	2003	2017	
San Diego	California	XHAS-TDT	33	2017	2022	
San Francisco	California	KEMO-TV	50	2011	2021	
San Luis Obispo	California	KSBO-CD	42	2012	2022	
Denver	Colorado	KRDH-LD	5.2	2019	2023	
Hartford	Connecticut	WRNT-LD	32	2001	2022	
Hartford	Connecticut	WTXX-LD	34	2018	2022	
Orlando	Florida	WDYB-CD	14	2019	2023	
Fort Myers–Naples	Florida	WTPH-LP	14	2003	2013	
Jacksonville	Florida	WJXE-LD	10	2019	2023	
Miami–Ft. Lauderdale	Florida	W16CC-D	16	2018	2023	
Naples	Florida	WANA-LD	16	2019	2023	
Orlando	Florida	W21AU	21	2008	2012	(Note: Repeater of WATV.)
Orlando	Florida	WATV-LD	47	2020	2023	
Pensacola	Florida	WEDS-LD	29	2018	2023	
Pensacola	Florida	WWBH-LD	28	2018	2023	
Tampa	Florida	WTAM-LD	30	2018	2022	
West Palm Beach	Florida	WTVX	34.2	2009	2023	(Note: Simulcast from WWHB-CD.)
West Palm Beach	Florida	WWHB-CD	48	2002	2023	
Atlanta	Georgia	WUVM-LD	4	2006	2022	
Columbus	Georgia	W29FD-D	43	2019	2022	
Macon	Georgia	W28EU-D	42	2020	2023	
Savannah	Georgia	WUET-LD	43	2020	2023	
Boise	Idaho	KCBB-LD	51	2015	2023	
Boise	Idaho	KEVA-LD	34	2015	2023	
Boise	Idaho	KFLL-LD	25	2018	2022	
Boise	Idaho	KZAK-LD	49	2015	2023	
Twin Falls	Idaho	KYTL-LP	17	—N/a	—N/a	
Chicago	Illinois	WCHU-LD	61	2010	2019	
Chicago	Illinois	WOCK-CD	13	2006	2010	
Chicago	Illinois	WPVN-CD	24	2019	2022	
Evansville	Indiana	W27DH-D	27	2019	2020	(Note: Repeater of WUCU-LD.)
Evansville	Indiana	WUCU-LD	33	2019	2020	
Fort Wayne	Indiana	W30EH-D	41	2019	2020	
Fort Wayne	Indiana	WCUH-LD	16	2017	2023	
Fort Wayne	Indiana	WODP-LD	49	2018	2020	
Des Moines	Iowa	KRPG-LD	43	2018	2022	
Sioux City	Iowa	KMEG-DT2	14.2	2009	2015	
Louisville	Kentucky	WKUT-LD	25	2021	2023	
Baton Rouge	Louisiana	K29LR-D	47	2020	2023	(Note: Repeater of WTNO-LD.)
Lafayette	Louisiana	K21OM-D	20	2020	2021	
New Orleans	Louisiana	WTNO-CD	22	2001	2022	
Baltimore	Maryland	WQAW-LD	69	2005	2022	
Boston	Massachusetts	WFXZ-CD	24	2006	2017	
Boston	Massachusetts	WLEK-LD	22	2020	2023	
Detroit	Michigan	WDWO-CD	18	2019	2023	
Midland	Michigan	WFFC-LD	17	2020	2023	
Columbia–Jefferson City	Missouri	K35OY-D	35	2019	2023	
Joplin	Missouri	KRLJ-LD	45	2017	2023	
Kansas City	Missouri	KQML-LD	46	2019	2023	
St. Louis	Missouri	K25NG-D	25	2012	2022	
St. Louis	Missouri	WLEH-LD	48	2020	2023	
Omaha	Nebraska	KAZO-LP	57	2002	2007	
Omaha	Nebraska	KAZO-LP	57	2008	2009	
Omaha	Nebraska	KXVO-DT2	15.2	2009	2014	
Las Vegas	Nevada	KHDF-CD	19	2004	2018	
Las Vegas	Nevada	KHDF-CD	19	2020	2023	
Reno	Nevada	KAZR-LP	46	2002	2007	
Reno	Nevada	KRRI-LD	25	2010	2023	
Newton	New Jersey	WMBC-TV	63.6	2010	2016	
Albuquerque	New Mexico	KQDF-LD	25	2001	2022	
New York City	New York	WKOB-LD	42	2019	2022	
Charlotte	North Carolina	WHEH-LD	41	2016	2023	
Wilmington	North Carolina	WQDH-LD	49	2019	2023	
Cleveland	Ohio	WQDI-LD	20	2019	2023	
Columbus	Ohio	WDEM-CD	17	2019	2022	
Columbus	Ohio	WCPX-LP	48	2007	2011	
Enid	Oklahoma	KXOK-LD	31.3	2012	2016	
Oklahoma City	Oklahoma	KOHC-CD	45	2007	2022	
Portland	Oregon	KPWC-LD	37	2008	2023	(Note: Simulcast on KWVT-LD and KSLM-LD on virtual channel 37.1.)
Darby	Pennsylvania	W25FG-D	36.4	2011	2023	(Note: Repeater of WPSJ-CD.)
Philadelphia	Pennsylvania	WPSJ-CD	8	2019	2023	
Mayagüez	Puerto Rico	W27DZ-D	14.2	2019	2023	(Note: Repeater of WOST.)
Mayagüez	Puerto Rico	WOST	14.2	2019	2023	
Quebradillas	Puerto Rico	WWKQ-LD	14.2	2018	2023	
Ponce	Puerto Rico	WQQZ-CD	14.2	2018	2023	
San Juan	Puerto Rico	W20EJ-D	26.2	2019	2023	
Charleston	South Carolina	WAZS-LD	29	2011	2023	
Myrtle Beach	South Carolina	WLDW-LD	9.2	2017	2018	
Memphis	Tennessee	WQEO-LD	49	2019	2023	
Amarillo	Texas	KLKW-LD	22.2	2016	2023	
Amarillo	Texas	KTXD-LP	43	2001	2009	
Austin	Texas	KVAT-LD	17	2015	2023	
Brownsville	Texas	KAZH-LP	57	2007	2021	(Note: Translator of KNWS-LP.)
Brownsville	Texas	KNWS-LP	64	2007	2021	
Brownsville	Texas	KRZG-CD	35	2007	2016	
Brownsville	Texas	KRZG-CD	35.4	2020	2021	
Corpus Christi	Texas	KCCX-LD	24	2006	2022	
Corpus Christi	Texas	KYDF-LD	34	2003	2023	
Dallas–Fort Worth	Texas	KAZD	55	2010	2022	
Dallas–Fort Worth	Texas	KAZD	55.3	2010	2022	
Dallas–Fort Worth	Texas	KODF-LD	26	2003	2010	
Dallas–Fort Worth	Texas	KLEG-LP	44	2006	2011	
El Paso	Texas	K42DJ	42	2002	2019	
El Paso	Texas	KVIA-DT4	7.4	2008	2023	
Harlingen	Texas	KRGV-TV	5.2	2020	2022	
Houston	Texas	KAZH	57	2002	2007	
Houston	Texas	KUVM-CD	34	2007	2010	
Houston	Texas	KUVM-LD	10.4	2009	2010	
Houston	Texas	KYAZ	51	2010	2021	
Houston	Texas	KYAZ	51.3	2021	2023	
Laredo	Texas	KETF-CD	39.4	2017	2023	
Laredo	Texas	KNEX-LP	55	—N/a	—N/a	
San Antonio	Texas	KVDF-CD	31	2002	2023	
Temple–Waco	Texas	KAXW-LD	35	2015	2023	
Temple–Waco	Texas	KCEN-DT3	6.3	2009	2011	
Tyler–Longview	Texas	KCEB	54	2020	2022	
Tyler–Longview	Texas	KDKJ-LD	27	2021	2022	
Tyler–Longview	Texas	KYTX	19.3	2009	2012	
Ogden	Utah	KPNZ	24	2018	2021	
Salt Lake City	Utah	KBTU-LD	23	2018	2023	
Richmond	Virginia	WFWG-LD	30	2018	2021	
Seattle	Washington	KFFV	44.2	2006	2018	
Seattle	Washington	KUSE-LD	46	2019	2022	
Yakima	Washington	KCWK	9	2003	2006	
Yakima	Washington	KYPK-LD	32	2013	2023	
Madison	Wisconsin	W23BW	23	2020	2023	(Note: Repeater of WTSJ-LP.)
Milwaukee	Wisconsin	WTSJ-LP	38	2015	2023	(Note: Originally affiliated from 2006−2012, when it switched to MundoFox/MundoMax as an analog station; re-affiliated in 2015 on a second subchannel after going digital under new ownership, returned to primary affiliation in September 2016.)
