= KVVV =

KVVV may refer to:

- KVVV-LD A low-power television station serving Houston, formerly a translator for what is now KUBE-TV (in which its call sign came from)
- KVVV-FM a radio station now KFGY
- KVVV-TV A former independent television station serving Galveston, Texas
- KVVV the ICAO airport code for Ortonville Municipal Airport
