= WIWN =

Television station in Fond du Lac, Wisconsin

- Fond du Lac–Milwaukee–; Green Bay, Wisconsin; United States
- City: Fond du Lac, Wisconsin
- Channels: Digital: 5 (VHF), applied for 7 (VHF); Virtual: 68

Programming
- Affiliations: 68.1: Cozi TV; for others, see § Subchannels

Ownership
- Owner: Family Worship Center Church, Inc.

History
- First air date: March 1, 1995 (original date); December 2000 (resumed operations) (Note: The Broadcasting and Cable Yearbook says December 1, while the Television and Cable Factbook says December 4.)
- Former call signs: WMMF-TV (1995–2004); WWAZ-TV (2004–2012)
- Former channel numbers: Analog: 68 (UHF, 2000–2008); Digital: 44 (UHF, 2008–2009)
- Former affiliations: FamilyNet (2000–2008); Dark (2008–2012); WeatherNation TV (2012–2014); SonLife (2014–June 2017 as main, currently on 68.8); OnTV4U (various subchannels, 2014–2018); GetTV (2017–2020)
- Call sign meaning: Wisconsin's Weather Nation (former affiliation)

Technical information
- Licensing authority: FCC
- Facility ID: 60571
- ERP: 9 kW; 34 kW (STA); 48 kW (application)
- HAAT: 338 m (1,109 ft); 339 m (1,112 ft) (application)
- Transmitter coordinates: 43°5′46.2″N 87°54′15.0″W

Links
- Public license information: Public file; LMS
- Website: www.wiwn.tv

WIWN (channel 68) is a television station licensed to Fond du Lac, Wisconsin, United States (in the Green Bay market), but primarily serving the Milwaukee area. Owned by Family Worship Center Church (FWCC) of Baton Rouge, Louisiana, the station maintains a transmitter on North Humboldt Boulevard in Milwaukee's Estabrook Park neighborhood.

WIWN carries Cozi TV on its primary channel. The SonLife Broadcasting Network, also owned by FWCC, airs on the station's second digital subchannel; it was carried on DT1 from 2014 to 2017 and on DT8 until 2026.

== History ==
The station first signed on the air in March 1, 1995 as WMMF-TV, but left the air and later returned on-air in December 2000, which carried programming from FamilyNet, under the ownership of Pappas Telecasting. It shared transmitter facilities with WWRS-TV (channel 52), north of Iron Ridge in Dodge County. WIWN is the second television station to be licensed to Fond du Lac. KFIZ-TV (channel 34), an independent station that was co-owned with KFIZ (1450 AM) and WFON (107.1 FM) and had operated from 1968 to 1972. The station changed its call letters to WWAZ in late 2004, in anticipation for a change in affiliation to the Spanish-language network Azteca América; however, the station never did join Azteca and Pappas ended up dropping almost all of its affiliations with the network from its stations in July 2007 during a conflict with the network, replacing it with its own new Spanish-language service, TuVision. During TuVision's life, the network was never carried by WWAZ.

Most of the station's audience prior to 2007 received its signal over-the-air, as WWAZ and Pappas had previously not pursued any must-carry provisions with local cable and national satellite providers because of affiliation uncertainties; for instance, the station was not carried on the Charter Communications system in Fond du Lac. From Iron Ridge, the station's coverage area ranged from most of the northern part of the eleven-county Milwaukee market area, to the eastern portion of the Madison market, along with the southern portions of the Green Bay market. However, as the station's transmitter was located west of the Kettle Moraine range that bisects the station's coverage area, communities in Sheboygan and Ozaukee counties were unable to receive the station without an outdoor antenna at minimum.

However, this changed in mid-2007, when Pappas filed a must-carry provision with Time Warner Cable's Northeastern Wisconsin system, and the station was subsequently added in Green Bay and the Fox Cities on June 26, 2007, replacing Milwaukee CW affiliate WVTV (channel 18), which had aired on the provider since the mid-1980s during that station's phase of becoming a superstation with intrastate coverage across Wisconsin. Eventually though, FamilyNet was added to Charter systems through a national deal to add it to their digital family tier, and carriage of WWAZ was of no priority to Charter, as the station carried the network without any local deviation, along with having on-air malfunctions to the point their hourly station identification would often not show up.

The station ceased broadcasting in January 2008 as the financial issues of Pappas Telecasting elsewhere began to build up, resulting in the ceasing of operations of sister station KCWK in Walla Walla, Washington. After the station went silent, a slide on the station's slot on Time Warner Cable went up containing the sentence "WWAZ-TV informed Time Warner Cable that it has ceased broadcast operations until further notice." On January 15, 2008, WWAZ-TV filed a request with the Federal Communications Commission (FCC) to cease broadcasting in analog before the end of the digital television transition period and become a digital-only station, broadcasting on UHF channel 44. The request was approved in late July 2008. The station continued to broadcast for a short time before permanently ending its analog service within two weeks.

Pappas filed for Chapter 11 bankruptcy on May 10, 2008, though the WWAZ license, operations and facilities were not covered under the filing. Due to Pappas's financial problems, the station remained silent long-term, and in an FCC filing, the station requested a move to channel 5 after CBS affiliate WFRV-TV discontinued its analog signal and vacated the channel in March 2009 (retaining its digital channel 39), but asserted it was unable to complete the new transmitter and tower until 2010 at the earliest.

=== Move to Milwaukee area ===
In August 2009, the FCC conditionally approved the move to channel 5 after the build-out of the new transmitter, which was approved for the traditional tower site on the northeast side of Milwaukee from the Milwaukee PBS tower. The channel 5 construction permit was accepted by the FCC on October 16, 2009.

The petition to move was contested by Weigel Broadcasting, WLFM-LP (now WRME-LD) in Chicago (a station using the analog channel 6 audio overlap quirk on 87.7 FM to broadcast a smooth jazz radio station with video imagery; it now by coincidence carries a Weigel-programmed oldies format spun off from their MeTV network and an ATSC 3.0 signal with Jewelry Television), as well as by Grand Valley State University in Allendale, Michigan, near Grand Rapids, which has its Kalamazoo PBS member station WGVK based on digital channel 5, mapping to virtual channel 52. Weigel objected mainly on concerns of abandonment by WWAZ of serving Fond du Lac and the surrounding area to become a full-time Milwaukee station (creating a possible competitor to Weigel's two full-power and two low-power stations in the area), while Grand Valley's and WLFM's concerns were with interference from the more southern signal within Chicago and across Lake Michigan.

The application was approved mainly due to ABC asking for the FCC to allow them to move the main digital signal of its Chicago owned-and-operated station WLS-TV from VHF channel 7 to UHF channel 44 due to signal reception problems in their market, a move supported by Pappas and approved by the FCC in October 2009, which was carried out at the beginning of 2010. Pappas planned to address the abandonment concerns of the rural audience by building two low-power digital translator stations in areas formerly served by the WWAZ analog signal, the first on channel 15 from Ripon which has reception in the city of Fond du Lac, and the second on channel 30, broadcasting from Columbus within the northeast reaches of the Madison market. However the Ripon and Columbus applications have since disappeared from the FCC database, leaving solely the entry for the Milwaukee tower site.

On August 12, 2012, it was reported that the station had begun to broadcast, airing programming from WeatherNation TV; it also changed its call letters to WIWN, which became official one day later on August 13. The network was carried fully in 1080i high definition, with forced framing to widescreen for standard definition viewers via the AFD#10 code. DirecTV picked up the station shortly after it came to air for their southeastern Wisconsin lineup under must-carry requested from Pappas.

The station acquired its first cable carriage in April 2014, when Charter added the stations to their southeastern Wisconsin systems as part of Charter's new retransmission consent agreement for Pappas stations elsewhere in the country, finally bringing the station carriage in its city of license of Fond du Lac. It airs on channel 22 on those Charter systems, along with channel 616 in high definition. Time Warner Cable added the station for their area systems on December 5, 2014, on standard channel 68 and in high definition on channel 1068.

On June 16, 2014, Pappas Telecasting and their bankruptcy trustees agreed to a purchase of the station for $1.8 million by Caballero Acquisition LLC, a station group mainly made up of low-power television stations in California and Texas formerly owned by Viacom which carry Viacom's MTV Tres channel, most of which were purchased mainly to acquire the assets of former competitor Mas Musica, a network owned by a past company of those who own Caballero. It entered into a local marketing agreement to operate the station until the completion of the sale. Upon the start of the temporary LMA, the station began to carry a secondary affiliation with the OnTV4U paid programming network, pre-empting WeatherNation programming. The sale was completed on September 24.

As of November 10, 2014, all WeatherNation programming was removed from the station's schedule, and outside of a daily 9 a.m. slot to carry required E/I programming, ran an all-infomercial format mainly from OnTV4U through the entire day.

On December 1, 2014, the station began to air programming from the religious Sonlife Broadcasting Network full-time, outside of a late night hour of paid programming. The same day, a second subchannel carrying paid programming was also added; eventually this channel picked up the shopping network Evine Live as a permanent affiliation. OnTV4U has continually moved subchannels since Cabellero's acquisition and is currently on WIWN-DT3. In late November 2015, a fourth subchannel carrying the bilingual LATV network was added, along with a downscaling of the main channel to 720p, which is Sonlife's default transmission format. Later, home shopping programming from the Liquidation Channel (now Shop LC) was also added to a 68.7 subchannel, along with an additional OnTV4U channel and two additional subchannels up for lease to interested parties. 68.6 was given over to QVC's over-the-air feed at the end of 2015; this is despite that network already being carried over-the-air in the market by WPXE-TV on their DT5 subchannel as part of Ion Television's national agreement with the network. The QVC feed on 68.6 was joined by QVC's "Plus" network on 68.5 in July 2016.

Charter added WIWN-DT4/LATV to the provider's Latino/Hispanic tier on May 4, 2016, over channel 201 on their area systems.

On April 13, 2017, the FCC announced the results of the 2016 spectrum auction; WIWN did not sell any spectrum (though this was expected as WIWN already uses a low-VHF channel).

On May 1, 2017, WIWN moved Sonlife (who had acquired their own carriage independently nationwide on Spectrum and AT&T U-Verse) to channel 68.8, which is not carried on cable, temporarily moving OnTV4U to the main channel, with Shop LC airing in duplicate on channels 68.3 and 68.7. The main signal picked up a new affiliation on June 22, 2017, when WIWN assumed an affiliation with the classic television network Cozi TV, which had been carried on WTMJ-DT3 until January 2017, and moved to WTSJ-LD3 in the interim six months. This allowed Cozi to finally be carried on Charter's legacy systems in the region for the first time, as that provider never has carried WTMJ's subchannels, nor any of WTSJ's channels. WTSJ-LD3 continued to carry Cozi for one month further before its replacement with Jewelry Television. As with Sonlife, one hour of the Cozi schedule late weeknights and several hours on weekend mornings remain preempted for paid programming.

On September 1, 2017, WIWN replaced Evine with Light TV on the DT2 subchannel. On February 24, 2018, OnTV4U permanently left WIWN's airwaves with the launch of Tegna's Quest on 68.3, though it remains in Milwaukee on WMKE-CD (channel 21), which was acquired by CNZ in 2018; OnTV4U replaced Rev'n on WMKE-CD. On May 1, 2018, the station picked up getTV for 68.4 (formerly carried by WVTV-DT2 before it switched to the former WCGV-TV schedule after that station turned in their spectrum on January 8, 2018); LATV moved to WIWN-DT7, with ShopLC moving off the station. Spectrum dropped carriage of WIWN-DT4 just after the conversion to GetTV. At the start of November 2018, the station picked up This TV for their fifth subchannel (the network was owned at the time by the same company which owned WITI, but the station refused to add new subchannels at the time, citing its channel sharing agreement with WVCY-TV).

In July 2019, the station received permission from the FCC to increase their power from its previous 9 kW to 35 kW due to complaints of over-the-air viewers unable to receive the station, as the low VHF frequencies like channel 5 have proven troublesome for reception in the digital age. CNZ/Milwaukee Media has also put forward an application for a permanent increase to 49 kW.

On March 11, 2022, WIWN filed a petition with the FCC to move its RF channel from low-VHF 5 to high-VHF 7, and to add a second distributed transmission system transmitter serving Fond du Lac County proper from north of St. Cloud.

On November 21, 2023, it was announced that WIWN would be sold to Jimmy Swaggart and Sonlife itself, through the Family Worship Center Church, for $8.9 million; the sale was completed on January 24, 2024. Milwaukee Media retained WMKE-CD.

== Subchannels ==
The station's signal is multiplexed:

Subchannels of WIWN
Subchannel	Res.	Short name	Programming
68.1	720p	COZI TV	Cozi TV
68.2	480i	SBN	SonLife
68.3	480i	Quest	Quest
68.4	480i	MOVIES	MovieSphere Gold
68.5	480i	Oxygen	Oxygen
68.6	480i	ROAR	Roar
68.7	480i	DABL	Dabl
68.8	480i	SBN	SonLife
68.11	480i	RVTV	RVTV
