= KUVM =

KUVM may refer to:

- KUVM-LD, a television station (channel 10, virtual 10) licensed to Houston, Texas, United States
- KUVM-CD, a television station (digital & virtual channel 34) licensed to Missouri City, Texas
