= South Asian TV =

South Asian TV is a TV station operating in the Houston, Texas area. This is the only broadcast channel in the Houston area to deliver South Asian programming all day long.

They concentrate on bringing a variety of programming of interest to the expatriate communities from Pakistan, India, and Bangladesh. This includes news, Bollywood films, documentaries, TV Dramas (a.k.a. "Soap operas"), and a broad variety of entertainment.

This channel broadcasts from KHLM-LD 43.5. Their offices are at 9950 Westpark Drive #200, Houston TX 77063. It began broadcasting in October 2010. It has a live internet feed through satv435.com.
