= CBS 44 =

CBS 44 may refer to one of the following television stations in the United States:

== Current ==
- KPTH-DT3, a digital channel of KPTH in Sioux City, Iowa
- WEVV-TV in Evansville, Indiana
- WSWG in Valdosta–Albany, Georgia

== Former ==
- WNAL-TV (now WPXH-TV) in Hoover, Alabama (1996 to 1999)
