= KXPD =

KXPD may refer to:

- KXPD (AM), a radio station (1040 AM) licensed to Tigard, Oregon, United States
- KXPD-LP, a low-power television station (channel 52) licensed to Eola, Oregon, United States
