= Dalú =

Mexican singer-songwriter

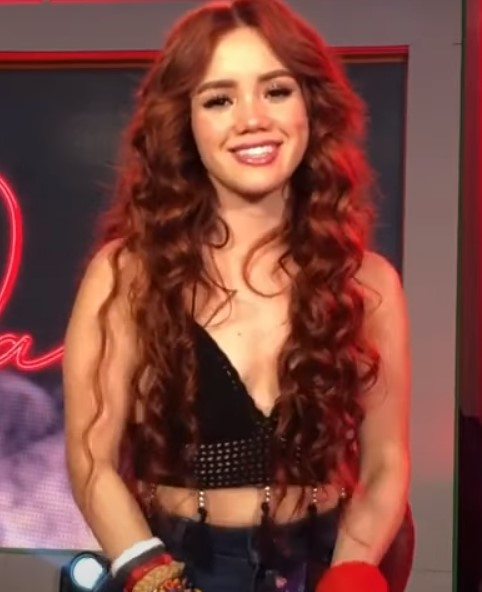
- Dalú in 2021

Background information
- Also known as: La niña de las mil canciones, Tiburona
- Born: María Fernanda Borunda Medina; August 29, 1995 (age 30)
- Origin: Culiacán, Sinaloa
- Genres: Latin pop
- Instruments: Vocals, Guitar
- Years active: 2012 - present

María Fernanda Borunda Medina (Culiacán, Sinaloa; August 29, 1995), artistically known as Dalú, is a Mexican singer-songwriter and music producer. On February 23, 2020, she was the winner of the twelfth generation of the Mexican music program La Academia on Azteca.

== Biography ==
She spent her first years surrounded by music, since her father is a musician and visual artist, with whom she has been since she was 3 years old, right after her parents divorced. He musical journey started at the age of 8, acting in scenarios of her elementary school; when she was in middle school she discovered her passion for songwriting and got her first guitar, which was given to her by her father. Those first years full of practice, led her to winning several music contests at school by singing and composing.

After Dalú's constancy on shaping her musical career, in 2015 her first official single was released, which name is "Dime" (Tell me). In 2018, she released her first single in English "Elvis's Look" along with a musical video which was filmed in many places within Arizona, US. In this same year, her first album in Spanish was released under her own name "DALÚ". This one includes 10 original songs of her own composition.

She describes her musical work as unique, not following any stereotypes. She outstands in composing and performing different musical genres in both English and Spanish, going through a wide range of influences such as rock, soul, country, funk and pop music. The artists who have inspired her along her career are Kany García, Shakira, Yuridia and Ha*Ash when speaking about her songs in Spanish; and Taylor Swift, Jessie J, Shania Twain, Britney Spears, Whitney Houston, Celine Dion as well as Mariah Carey for her songs in English.

== Discography ==
=== Álbumes ===
- 2014: Niña complicada
- 2018: Dalú
- 2019: Garaje de sesiones
- 2021: Rojita
- 2022: En Vivo Desde El Teatro Hidalgo
- 2025: Luna
- 2026: Playlist Para Esos Días Nublados (Desde La Raíz)

=== EP's ===
- 2021: Navidalú

=== Singles ===
- "Dime" (2016)
- "Elvis's Look" (2018)
- "Breathless" (2018)
- "Driving in My Car" (2019)
- "Amigo" (2019)
- "Principiante" (2019)
- "Inquebrantable" (2020)
- "Mejor Sola" (2020)
- "Traviesa" (2020)
- "10 Minutos" (2020)
- "Cruel" (2020)
- "Atrás" (2021)
- "Yo Soy Aquí Estoy" (2022)
- "Tuya" (2024)
- "Antes de las diez" ft. Kalimba (2024)
- "Excepción" (2025)
- "Final feliz" (2025)
- "Dame una señal" (2025)
- Inquebrantable (Desde La Raíz) (2026)
- Inquebrantable (Historias Acústicas) (2026)
- Nueva York ft. Édgar Oceransky (2026)
