= Pappas Telecasting =

American media company

Pappas Telecasting Companies
- Type: Private
- Industry: Media
- Founded: 1971
- Defunct: 2018
- Fate: Chapter 11 bankruptcy Television stations sold
- Headquarters: Visalia, California
- Services: Broadcast television

Pappas Telecasting Companies was a broadcasting company headquartered in Visalia, California, United States.

== History ==
=== Foundation ===
In 1967, Pappas Electronics, owner of radio stations KGEN and KBOS in Tulare, petitioned the FCC for the addition of channel 26 at that city; this was granted on July 26, 1967, on the condition that Pappas apply for the channel. The Pappas brothers—Mike, Pete and Harry—received a construction permit for channel 26 on November 6, 1968; KMPH signed on the air on October 11, 1971, as an independent station, broadcasting from studios at Mooney Boulevard in Visalia. While Mike and Pete Pappas originally controlled 45 percent each of the new venture (called Pappas Telivision Inc.), with Harry owning the other ten percent, other investors were brought on, and by 1973 their combined stake in KMPH was only 30.5 percent.

In 1978, Harry Pappas formed a new company, Pappas Telecasting Inc., to buy full control of the station for $3.1 million.

=== Growth outside California ===
Pappas Telecasting began conducting community surveys in February 1979 looking toward establishing a station on ultra high frequency (UHF) channel 15 in Omaha; the company also leased the building at 2615 Farnam Street, recently vacated by KMTV. Channel 15 was contested by multiple parties, with three groups in the running by June 1979 and a total of eight by early November, when Pappas switched from seeking channel 15 to channel 42.

KPTM began broadcasting on April 6, 1986.

=== Affiliations with Fox and the WB ===
In September 1988, the three Pappas independent stations — KPTM in Omaha, Nebraska; KMPH in Fresno, California; and WHNS in Asheville, North Carolina — joined Fox. Pappas expanded its programming in the Omaha market when it began operating the new KXVO (channel 15) in 1995; the station, owned by Cocola Broadcasting, was an affiliate of The WB.

=== Bankruptcy ===
On May 10, 2008, thirteen of Pappas' stations filed for Chapter 11 Bankruptcy protection. Pappas cited "the extremely difficult business climate for television stations across the country" in papers filed with the U.S. Bankruptcy Court in Wilmington, Delaware. The company reported in court filings that it had more than $536 million in debt and $460 million in assets. Problems that led to the bankruptcy included poor performance of The CW network, its now-former involvement with Azteca America, and preparations for the 2009 analog shutdown. Stations involved in the bankruptcy were KMPH-TV, KFRE-TV, KPTM, KXVO, WCWG, KPTH, KMEG, KTNC-TV, KAZH, KDBC-TV, KREN-TV, KAZR-CA and KCWK. It was later ordered on September 10, 2008, that the affected stations must be sold off by February 15, 2009. Its other stations, and the corporation itself, were not part of the bankruptcy. On May 14 of the same year, company founder Harry J. Pappas filed for Chapter 7 bankruptcy at the Delaware court, where a judge could order his personal assets sold to pay off creditors. 13 days later, on May 27, KCWK in Walla Walla, Washington (in the Yakima, Washington television market) ceased operations as a result of the bankruptcy.

On September 17, bankruptcy trustee E. Roger Williams put KREN and its repeaters under contract to Entravision Communications for $4 million, which would double as a minimum bid for the station as it goes up for auction in late October. New World TV Group (later renamed, Titan TV Broadcast Group; unrelated to New World Communications) agreed to acquire the remaining Pappas stations involved in the bankruptcy filing on December 17. The sale was approved by the United States bankruptcy court on January 16, 2009. The remaining stations that weren't involved in the initial bankruptcy filing were later placed in a liquidating trust in December 2011.

KMPH Radio ceased operations September 1, 2010, due to lack of revenue. Two weeks later, KTRB went into receivership with Comerica Bank, under license from KTRB Trust. This marked the end of Pappas era.

By 2014, the company began to sell all of its television stations to other companies such as Sinclair Broadcast Group, and began winding down operations; the company officially ceased operations when its final remaining station, KAZA-TV in Los Angeles, was sold to Weigel Broadcasting in 2018.

== Former stations ==
- Stations are arranged in alphabetical order by state and city of license.

Stations owned by Pappas Telecasting
Media market	State	Station	Purchased	Sold	Notes
Auburn	Alabama	WLGA	1996	2016	(Note: Known as WSWS-TV prior to 2005.)
Yuma	Arizona	KSWT	2000	2014	
Bakersfield	California	KBBV-CD	2001	2011	
Bakersfield	California	KBFX-LP	1990	2005	(Note: Translator of KMPH-TV.)
Los Angeles	California	KAZA-TV	2001	2018	
Fresno	California	KFRE-TV	2002	2009	
Fresno	California	KMPH-TV	1971	2009	
San Francisco–Oakland	California	KTNC-TV	1996	2009	
San Francisco–Oakland	California	KUNO-TV	1997	2009	(Note: Satellite of KTNC-TV.)
Sacramento	California	KPWB	1994	1998	(Note: Known as KRBK-TV prior to 1995.)
Vero Beach	Florida	WMMF-LP	2006	2014	
Ames–Des Moines	Iowa	KCWI-TV	2001	2016	
Ames–Des Moines	Iowa	KDMI	2006	2016	
Sioux City	Iowa	KMEG	2005	2009	(Note: Owned by a third party and operated by Pappas.)
Sioux City	Iowa	KPTH	1999	2009	
Grand Island	Nebraska	KTVG-TV	1996	2009	(Note: Satellite of KFXL-TV.)
Hayes Center	Nebraska	KWNB-TV	1996	2016	(Note: Satellite of KHGI-TV.)
Kearney–Hastings	Nebraska	KHGI-TV	1996	2016	
Lincoln	Nebraska	KFXL-TV	2006	2016	
North Platte	Nebraska	KHGI-CD	2006	2016	(Note: Satellite of KHGI-TV.) (Note: Known as WSWS-LD from 2007 to 2009.)
Omaha	Nebraska	KAZO-LP	1999	2008	(Note: Ceased operations at this date.)
Omaha	Nebraska	KPTM	1986	2009	
Omaha	Nebraska	KXVO	1995	2009	
Superior	Nebraska	KSNB-TV	1996	2009	(Note: Satellite of KFXL-TV.)
Reno	Nevada	KAZR-CA	1995	2009	
Reno	Nevada	KREN-TV	1995	2009	
Asheville	North Carolina	WASV-TV	1995	2002	
Greensboro–Winston-Salem	North Carolina	WCWG	1995	2009	
Greenville	South Carolina	WHNS	1984	1990	
Austin	Texas	KXLK-CD	2003	2015	
Corpus Christi	Texas	KXCC-CA	2003	2015	
El Paso	Texas	KDBC-TV	2004	2009	
Houston	Texas	KAZH	1999	2009	(Note: Known as KVVV prior to 2000.)
Houston	Texas	KHMV-LP	1999	2007	
Houston	Texas	KVVV-LP	1999	2013	
Walla Walla	Washington	KCWK	2002	2008	
Yakima	Washington	KCWK-LP	2002	2008	(Note: Translator of KCWK.)
Green Bay–Milwaukee	Wisconsin	WIWN	2000	2014	(Note: Known as WMMF-TV from 2000 to 2004, and as WWAZ-TV from 2004 to 2012.)

=== Former broadcast network ===
- TuVisión
