= As for Me and My House (TV series) =

- Created by: Lionell Hilliard; in association with MPAC Media
- Starring: Jalene Mack; Jenifer Jermany; Curtis Von; Ashley Hildreth; Anthony Bellard; Anetra Parrett; Rachon Sims; Tjuan Kimbrough
- Composer: John Hilliard
- Country of origin: United States
- No. of seasons: 1

Production
- Production location: Houston, Texas
- Cinematography: David A. Williamson Jr.
- Editor: Lionell Hilliard
- Production companies: Big Powerful Media; Black Genie Entertainment

Original release
- Network: KNWS-TV
- Release: 2008 – 2009

As for Me and My House is an American sitcom produced in Houston, Texas, that aired on KNWS-TV (now KYAZ) in Houston.

== Overview ==
The sitcom stars Nicole (Jalene Mack) and Michelle (Jennifer Jermany), two divorced African-American sisters, and their children. Nicole is a successful lawyer who lives in the Houston suburbs while Michelle is a New Orleans, Louisiana hairstylist with three children from different fathers. Hurricane Katrina forces Michelle to move into Nicole's Houston house.

Lionell Hilliard, of Black Genie Entertainment, created the series in association with MPAC Media of Houston. All portions of the production, including the actors, originated from Houston.

The title of the series came from the Book of Joshua (24:2, 15): "And Joshua said unto all the people [of Israel]... choose you this day whom ye will serve... but as for me and my house, we will serve the Lord."

It premiered on KNWS-TV on January 20, 2008. The production planned to make 13 episodes.

== Characters ==
- Nicole (Jalene Mack) is a Houston lawyer
  - Nicole has a very busy schedule, so she hardly sees her children.
- Michelle (Jenifer Jermany), Nicole's sister, is a New Orleans hairstylist
  - Michelle, a hairdresser, is from New Orleans and has three children. The family goes to Houston after Hurricane Katrina hits New Orleans. Nicole Ferweda of the Houston Business Journal said that Michelle "is a wonderful mother who can relate to her kids even as she doses them with tough love."
- Thomas (Curtis Von) is Nicole's boyfriend
- Imani (Ashley Hildreth) is Nicole's daughter
- Hakim (Anthony Bellard)
- Lexie (Anetra Parrett)
- Cameron (Rachon Sims)
- Deuce (Tjuan Kimbrough)
