= KUVM-LD =

Television station in Missouri City, Texas

- Missouri City–Houston, Texas; United States
- City: Missouri City, Texas
- Channels: Digital: 10 (VHF), shared with KHLM-LD; Virtual: 10

Programming
- Affiliations: see § Subchannels

Ownership
- Owner: Innovate Corp.; (HC2 LPTV Holdings, Inc.)
- Sister stations: KEHO-LD, KUGB-CD, KUVM-CD, KBMN-LD

History
- Founded: August 6, 1980
- First air date: August 14, 2007
- Former call signs: K10PY-D (2007−2009)
- Former channel numbers: Digital: 10 (VHF, 2009−2010), 40 (UHF, 2010−2012), 22 (UHF, 2012−2021)
- Former affiliations: Multimedios (via KHLM-LD, 2007−2009); Azteca América (2009−2010)
- Call sign meaning: Una Vez Más (former owner)

Technical information
- Licensing authority: FCC
- Facility ID: 167664
- Class: LD
- ERP: 3 kW
- HAAT: 439.1 m (1,441 ft)
- Transmitter coordinates: 29°33′45.2″N 95°30′35.9″W

Links
- Public license information: LMS

KUVM-LD (channel 10) is a low-power television station licensed to Missouri City, Texas, United States, serving the Houston area. The station is owned by Innovate Corp.

== History ==
The station began on August 14, 2007 on channel 10 with the call sign K10PY-D. The station converted to digital transmission in October 2009, initially running a simulcast of KHLM until that station obtained a digital signal of its own, and later replacing it with the Azteca América programming of former analog station KUVM-CA, and changing its call sign to KUVM-LD on October 9, 2009. The station's signal moved to channel 40 from the Missouri City tower farm on July 24, 2010.

On April 25, 2010, Azteca América programming began airing on KNWS, which Una Vez Más Holdings had contracted to buy. KUVM-LD dropped Azteca América from its fourth subchannel on January 25, 2011.

Citing interference from KUBE-TV, the station applied on November 5, 2010, to move its physical channel from 40 to 14. That application was denied, and the station filed to move to channel 18 in January 2012, and also filed to move to channel 22 in February 2012. The application to move to channel 22 was granted May 29, 2012, and the station finalized that move in October 2012.

In June 2013, KUVM-LD was slated to be sold to Landover 5 LLC as part of a larger deal involving 51 other low-power television stations; the sale fell through in June 2016. Mako Communications sold its stations, including KUVM-LD, to HC2 Holdings in 2017.

KUVM-LD was licensed to move to digital channel 10 on February 9, 2021.

== Subchannels ==
Subchannels of KHLM-LD and KUVM-LD
License	Channel	Res.	Short name	Programming
KHLM-LD	12.1	720p	KHLM-LD	CTN
KHLM-LD	12.2	480i	KHLMLD2	CTN International
KUVM-LD	10.1	480i	KUVM-LD	Defy
KUVM-LD	10.2	480i	KUVMLD2	SonLife
KUVM-LD	10.3	480i	KUVMLD3	365BLK
KUVM-LD	10.4	480i	KUVMLD4	Outlaw
