= KVVV-LD =

Television station in Houston

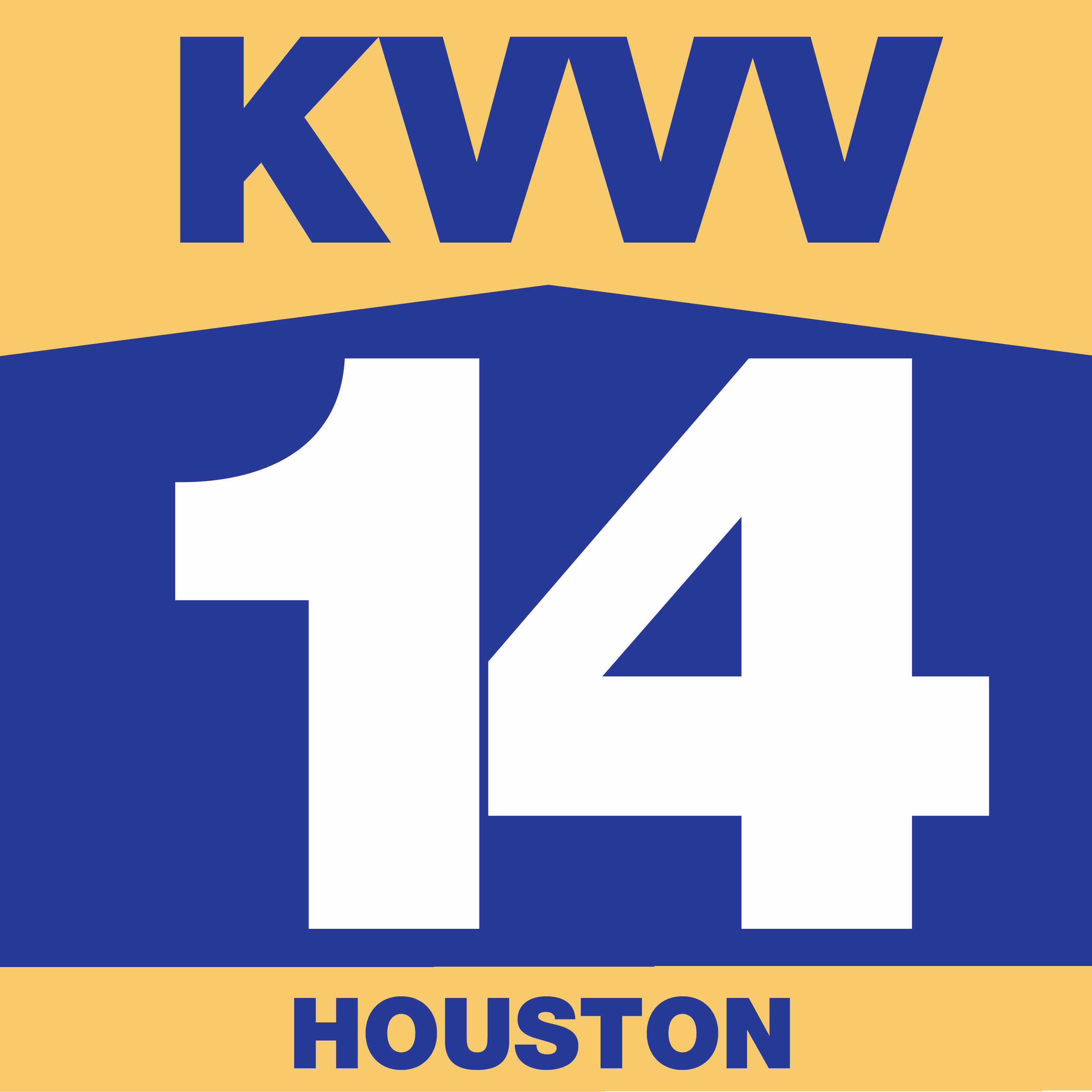
- Houston, Texas; United States
- Channels: Digital: 15 (UHF); Virtual: 15

Programming
- Affiliations: see § Subchannels

Ownership
- Owner: Bridge Media Networks; (Bridge News LLC)

History
- First air date: 1991
- Former call signs: K53FV (1991–2000); KVVV-LP (2000–2011)
- Former channel numbers: Analog: 53 (UHF, 1991–2009)
- Former affiliations: The Word Network (2013–2023); NewsNet (2023–2024); ShopHQ (2024–2025); As repeater of KAZH: ValueVision (2000); FamilyNet (2000–2002); Azteca América (2002–2007); TuVision (2007–2009)
- Call sign meaning: "Heritage" call letters of defunct station KVVV-TV

Technical information
- Licensing authority: FCC
- Facility ID: 6690
- Class: LD
- ERP: 15 kW
- HAAT: 497.3 m (1,632 ft)
- Transmitter coordinates: 29°34′16″N 95°30′38″W

Links
- Public license information: LMS

KVVV-LD (channel 15) is a low-power television station in Houston, Texas, United States. The station is owned by Bridge News LLC, backed by entrepreneur Manoj Bhargava. KVVV-LD's transmitter is located near Missouri City, in unincorporated northeastern Fort Bend County.

== History ==
Originally owned by VVI LPTV Inc. (a subsidiary of the ValueVision home shopping network), the station began broadcasting under the call sign K53FV at the end of 1991. It had been licensed to broadcast on channel 55, but made way for full-power KTBU by moving to channel 53. Its original transmitter site was at the top of the Texas Commerce Tower in downtown Houston.

The station was sold to Pappas Telecasting in July 1999. The new owners changed the call sign to KVVV-LP on February 21, 2000. During its brief time on the air under Pappas ownership, the station served as a repeater of Pappas' full-power station on channel 57 with KUGB. Pappas took the station off the air March 1, 2001, and the station remained off the air through November 2004.

In June 2004, the station was granted permission to move to a new tower site near Moses Lake north of Texas City. During construction, the tower at the Texas City site was found to be unsafe, and Pappas requested permission to broadcast temporarily from Missouri City beginning in September 2006.

On September 11, 2007, KVVV-LP was granted a permit to build a digital station on channel 15. The change in channel assignment was due to the Federal Communications Commission (FCC)'s auction of block B of the lower 700 MHz frequency band, which is now used by cellular telephones.

Pappas Telecasting's financial difficulties forced KVVV-LP to go off the air November 3, 2007. KVVV-LP's channel 53 analog transmitter was returned to the air briefly on October 30, 2009, to avoid cancellation of its license. (Federal law mandates that a station that is silent for more than a year must surrender its license.) A short time after transmissions resumed, a line carrying coolant to the transmitter burst, spraying coolant over the engineer and the transmitter. The channel 53 transmitter shut down immediately and never returned to the air.

The station's call sign was changed to KVVV-LD on January 28, 2011, and the station returned to the air on channel 15 on January 17, 2012. In January 2013, KVVV-LD (by now held by a liquidating trustee) was sold to Abraham Telecasting Company, which took over the station's operations on February 1 while the acquisition awaits FCC approval. The new owner quickly moved to add multicast channels to the station; The Word Network and Christian Television Network were the first two added.

On June 6, 2023, it was announced that Bridge Media Networks, the parent company of 24/7 headline news service NewsNet, backed by 5-hour Energy creator Manoj Bhargava, would acquire KVVV-LD for $1.55 million. Upon completion of the transaction, KVVV-LD will become the fifth NewsNet owned-and-operated station in the state of Texas. In August 2024, NewsNet ceased operations and the station replaced the spot with ShopHQ. After ShopHQ ceased operations on April 17, 2025, KVVV-LD's main programming switched to Binge.

== Subchannels ==
The station's signal is multiplexed:

Subchannels of KVVV-LD
Subchannel	Res.	Short name	Programming
15.1	480i	KVVV	Binge TV
15.2	480i	Bridge1	Infomercials
15.3	480i	Bridge2	Infomercials
15.4	480i	AWSN	All Women's Sports Network
15.5	480i	OAN	One America Plus
15.6	480i	YTA	YTA TV
15.7	480i	Sales	Infomercials
15.8	480i	BarkTV	Bark TV
15.9	480i	ZLiving	Z Living
15.10	480i	FTF	FTF Sports
15.11	480i	MTRSPR1	MtrSpt1
15.12	480i	AWE	AWE Plus
15.13	480i	NBT	National Black TV
15.14	480i	DrOz	Oz TV
15.15	480i	Bein	beIN Sports Xtra
15.16	480i	ShopNow	Infomercials

Subchannel broadcast with MPEG-4 video
