= VasalloVision =

Former American Spanish-language TV network

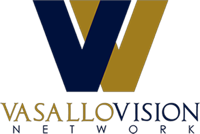
- Country: United States

Programming
- Language: Spanish

Ownership
- Key people: Carlos Vasallo, president and CEO

History
- Launched: October 22, 2009
- Founder: Carlos Vasallo and Miguel Banojian
- Closed: August 13, 2012 (2 years, 296 days)
- Replaced by: MundoFox (de facto)

Links
- Website: vasallovision.tv

VasalloVision was a small Spanish-language television network in the United States that catered to the Mexican audience. Most of its schedule consisted of films, lucha libre, and children's programming. The network was made up of four stations, mostly in the western part of the country.

The network started broadcasting on October 22, 2009 in Houston. The aim was to emulate Ted Turner's networks, as a superstation using its vast catalog of Mexican movies, most of which never aired on US television before. For 2010, the network aimed to reach 50% of Hispanic households. All its affiliates would affiliate with MundoMax upon its launch on August 13, 2012, and the network wound down operations on that same date.

== Former affiliates ==
City	Station	Channel	Owner	Comment
Del Rio/San Antonio, Texas	KYVV-TV	10.1	SATV 10, LLC	Current Estrella TV affiliate
Aurora/Denver, Colorado	KQDK-CA (satellite of KQCK, Cheyenne, WY)	39	Fusion Communications	Sold to Christian Television Network
Cheyenne, Wyoming/Denver, Colorado	KQCK	33.1	Fusion Communications	Sold to Christian Television Network
Baytown/Houston, Texas	KAZH	57.1	Titan Broadcast Group	First station to carry VasalloVision programming. Now KUBE-TV, a ShopHQ affiliate owned by WRNN Associates.
Laughlin/Las Vegas, Nevada	KMCC	32.1	Beam Tilt, LLC	Now owned by Ion Media and carrying Ion Television.
Louisville, Kentucky	WBKI-TV	34.2	Fusion Communications	Dropped in August 2012 after ownership switch; station taken off air in 2017 in FCC spectrum auction.
