= Dakota Dunes, South Dakota =

Unincorporated community in South Dakota, U.S.

Dakota Dunes
- Census-designated place
- Location within the state of South Dakota Dakota Dunes (the United States)
- Coordinates: 42°29′54″N 96°29′44″W
- Country: United States
- State: South Dakota
- County: Union

Area
  - Total: 2.86 sq mi (7.40 km^{2})
  - Land: 2.47 sq mi (6.39 km^{2})
  - Water: 0.39 sq mi (1.00 km^{2})
- Elevation: 1,093 ft (333 m)

Population (2020)
  - Total: 4,020
  - Density: 1,628.3/sq mi (628.69/km^{2})
- Time zone: UTC-6 (Central)
  - Summer (DST): UTC-5 (CDT)
- ZIP code: 57049
- Area code: 605
- FIPS code: 46-15256
- GNIS feature ID: 2628843
- Website: dakotadunes.com

Dakota Dunes is an unincorporated community and census-designated place (CDP), master-planned residential and commercial development covering about 2,000 acres (8.1 km^{2}) in Union County in the extreme southeast corner of the U.S. state of South Dakota. The population was 4,020 at the 2020 census.

== Demographics ==
Historical population
Census	Pop.	Note	%±
2010	2,540		—
2020	4,020		58.3%
U.S. Decennial Census; 2020 Census

=== 2020 census ===
As of the 2020 census, Dakota Dunes had a population of 4,020. The median age was 41.0 years. 25.6% of residents were under the age of 18 and 18.2% of residents were 65 years of age or older. For every 100 females there were 102.1 males, and for every 100 females age 18 and over there were 101.6 males age 18 and over.

100.0% of residents lived in urban areas, while 0.0% lived in rural areas.

There were 1,546 households in Dakota Dunes, of which 33.1% had children under the age of 18 living in them. Of all households, 65.5% were married-couple households, 14.7% were households with a male householder and no spouse or partner present, and 15.8% were households with a female householder and no spouse or partner present. About 21.5% of all households were made up of individuals and 10.4% had someone living alone who was 65 years of age or older.

There were 1,592 housing units, of which 2.9% were vacant. The homeowner vacancy rate was 1.5% and the rental vacancy rate was 2.2%.

Racial composition as of the 2020 census
Race	Number	Percent
White	3,533	87.9%
Black or African American	68	1.7%
American Indian and Alaska Native	19	0.5%
Asian	167	4.2%
Native Hawaiian and Other Pacific Islander	2	0.0%
Some other race	37	0.9%
Two or more races	194	4.8%
Hispanic or Latino (of any race)	154	3.8%

=== 2010 census ===
As of the census of 2010, there were 2,540 people.

== Overview ==
The development is sandwiched between the Big Sioux River and the Missouri River. The nearest incorporated municipality is North Sioux City, South Dakota, with which Dakota Dunes shares the zip code 57049. Dakota Dunes is about five miles (8.0 km) west of downtown Sioux City, Iowa. As of March 31, 2013, its population stood at 2,688. Law enforcement is provided by the Union County Sheriff.

Dakota Dunes has five main neighborhoods, including the Country Club Estates, the Meadows, the Prairie, the Willows, and upscale apartment living.

Dakota Dunes is owned and developed by Berkshire Hathaway Energy of Des Moines, Iowa, which unveiled plans for the community in 1988. The development is home to Dakota Dunes Country Club, a golf course designed by Arnold Palmer's design company. Two Rivers Golf Club, which existed as the Sioux City Boat Club prior to the existence of Dakota Dunes, is also nearby. Dakota Dunes contains the studios of local television stations KPTH and KMEG, which were built between 1999 and 2000.

In 2011 and 2019, historic flooding along the Big Sioux and Missouri Rivers threatened the town.
