= KWVT-LD =

Television station based in Salem, Oregon

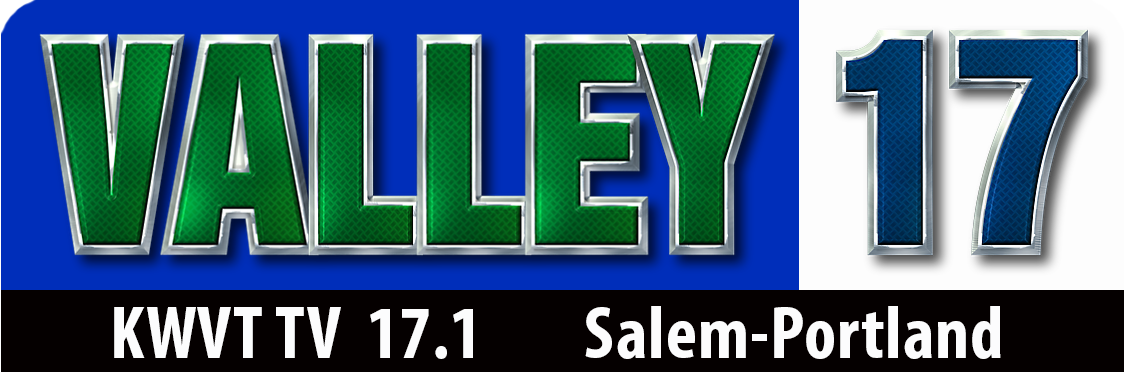

Salem–Portland, Oregon; United States
- City: Salem, Oregon
- Channels: Digital: 11 (VHF); Virtual: 17
- Branding: Valley 17

Programming
- Affiliations: 3.1: QVC; 17.1: YTA TV; 27.1: theDove

Ownership
- Owner: Northwest Television, LLC; (Michael Mattson)

History
- First air date: May 20, 2005
- Former call signs: K17IV (2007); KWVT-LP (2007–2011)
- Former channel numbers: Analog: 17 (UHF, 2007–2011); Digital: 49 (UHF, 2011–2021)
- Former affiliations: Azteca América (2007–2022)
- Call sign meaning: Willamette Valley Television

Technical information
- Licensing authority: FCC
- Facility ID: 129197
- Class: LD
- ERP: 3 kW
- HAAT: 395.3 m (1,297 ft)
- Transmitter coordinates: 45°31′22″N 122°45′11″W

Links
- Public license information: LMS
- Website: www.kwvtsalem.com

KWVT-LD (channel 17) is a low-power television station licensed to Salem, Oregon, United States, serving the Portland area. The station is owned by Northwest Television, LLC. KWVT-LD's transmitter is located in West Portland.

== History ==
The station signed on the air on channel 52, licensed to Eola, on May 20, 2005.

On May 8, 2007, Northwest Television sold channel 52 to Churchill Media of Eugene, Oregon. On August 17, 2007, channel 52 began carrying programming from the Spanish-language Azteca América network, as KXPD-LP. (That station would cease operations by the end of 2009.)

Northwest Television had since moved to K17IV (channel 17), which adopted the KWVT-LP calls in November 2007, and changed the city of license from Eola to Salem.

In September 2008, Northwest Television activated a digital signal on KSLM-LD (channel 16). As of March 15, 2010, KSLM has moved to channel 27.

On December 31, 2022, Azteca América ceased operations.

== Programming ==
Independent producers develop original programming for KWVT-LD, such as Garden Time, Fusion, High Desert Outdoorsman and Living Culture, as well as music video shows Hard Times, My Hits and Country Comfort. KWVT-LD has a high-definition production facility that covers area events such as high school football.

KWVT-LD is the local primary Emergency Alert System (EAS) station for the "(Oregon State) Capitol Operational Area".

== Technical information ==
=== Subchannels ===
The station's signal is multiplexed:

Subchannels of KSLM-LD, KWVT-LD, KPWC-LD, and KVDO-LD
Channel	Res.	Aspect	Short name	Programming
3.1	480i	16:9	KVDO	QVC
17.1	720p	16:9	KWVT	YTA TV
27.1	480i	16:9	KSLM	theDove
37.1	720p	16:9	Azteca	Estrella TV

=== Analog-to-digital conversion ===
KWVT-LP had a construction permit to convert to digital and move the transmitter to the Skyline Tower in Portland, Oregon, home to numerous TV and FM stations.

After negotiations to use the Skyline site broke down, other sites were considered. On December 22, 2010, an application was filed to locate the digital facility on the former KPDX tower, approximately half a kilometer from the Skyline tower. KWVT-LP would use the antenna MyNetworkTV affiliate KPDX (channel 49) had shut down at the end of the DTV transition. The modified construction permit was granted on January 7, 2011. Since no construction was required on the tower, KWVT-LP began transmitting a digital signal in Portland later the same day.

== Other translator stations ==
Northwest Television can also be viewed in other locations.

- KPWC-LD 24 Tillamook, Oregon
- K04PH 4 Astoria, Oregon
- K38KU-D 38 Corvallis, Oregon (launched 9/24/10)
