= Johnson Broadcasting =

American broadcasting company

Johnson Broadcasting, Inc. was a privately owned television broadcasting firm based in Houston, Texas. The company was founded, owned and operated by Douglas R. Johnson (this is not the same Doug Johnson, who was the late former weathercaster with NBC affiliate KPRC Channel 2 in Houston, Texas).

== Company Troubles ==
On October 16, 2008; Douglas Johnson and this company filed for voluntary Chapter 11 bankruptcy . Johnson Broadcasting continues to run as a debtor in possession and two TV stations remain on the air.

In October 2009, it was announced that Johnson Broadcasting may be forced to sell KLDT and KNWS to Una Vez Más Holdings, LLC. The sale of these stations to Una Vez Más was approved by the bankruptcy court on December 29, 2009 and has finally received FCC approval September 27, 2010 after the FCC rejected a petition to deny the sale made by Spanish Broadcasting System. The call letters for both KLDT and KNWS were respectively changed to KAZD and KYAZ.

In 2014, Una Vez Mas' TV assets were then sold to Northstar Media, LLC. In turn, HC2 Holdings acquired Northstar Media in addition to Azteca América on November 29, 2017, making KAZD and KYAZ Azteca owned-and-operated stations. On October 28, 2020, HC2 Holdings Unit sold KAZD and KYAZ to Weigel Broadcasting. The sale was completed on December 29 and Weigel converted both stations to MeTV owned-and-operated stations on March 29, 2021; both stations retain affiliation with Azteca America via their third digital subchannels. KAZD moved MeTV to KAZD-DT2 and began a simulcast of Spectrum News 1 on KAZD-DT1 on July 15, 2022.

== Former Stations ==
Market (City Of License)	Prior callsign & Virtual Ch. (DT Ch.)	Prior Affiliation
Dallas/Fort Worth (Lake Dallas, Texas)	KLDT 55.1 (39)	Infomercials
Greater Houston (Katy, Texas)	KNWS 51.1 (47)	Independent
