= KYVV-TV =

Television station in Del Rio, Texas

KYVV-TV and KGMM-CD
KYVV-TV: Del Rio, Texas; KGMM-CD: San Antonio, Texas; United States
- Channels for KYVV-TV: Digital: 28 (UHF); Virtual: 10
- Channels for KGMM-CD: Digital: 36 (UHF); Virtual: 10

Programming
- Affiliations: 10.1: Estrella TV; for others, see § Subchannels

Ownership
- Owner: CNZ Communications; (Stryker Media LLC/Caballero III, LLC)

History
- First air date: KYVV-TV: September 1, 1997; KGMM-CD: June 17, 1999
- Former call signs: KYVV-TV: KTRG (1997–2010); KGMM-CD: K58EU (1994–2000); KGMM-LP (2000–2003); KGMM-CA (2003–2014); KGMM-LD (2014)
- Former channel number: KYVV-TV: Analog: 10 (VHF, 1997–2009); KGMM-CD: Analog: 58 (UHF, 1999–2002), 44 (UHF, 2002–2009); Digital: 24 (UHF, 2009–2017)
- Former affiliations: KYVV-TV: Independent (1997–1998); UPN (1998–1999); Religious (1999–2005); Silent (2005–2010, 2016–2018); VasalloVision (2010–2012); MundoFox/MundoMax (2012–2016); Grit (2018–2024, now on 10.2); Merit TV (2024–2026)
- Call sign meaning: KYVV-TV: Your Vasallo Vision (former affiliation)

Technical information
- Licensing authority: FCC
- Facility ID: KYVV-TV: 55762; KGMM-CD: 17830
- Class: KGMM-CD: CD
- ERP: KYVV-TV: 237 kW; KGMM-CD: 15 kW
- HAAT: KYVV-TV: 80.5 m (264 ft); KGMM-CD: 127.8 m (419 ft)
- Transmitter coordinates: KYVV-TV: 29°20′40″N 100°51′40″W; KGMM-CD: 29°26′29.9″N 98°30′22.8″W

Links
- Public license information: KYVV-TV: Public file; LMS; KGMM-CD: Public file; LMS

KYVV-TV (channel 10) is a television station in Del Rio, Texas, United States, affiliated with Estrella TV. The station is owned by CNZ Communications, and maintains transmitter facilities on US 277 southeast of Del Rio.

KYVV-TV's first and second subchannels are relayed in the San Antonio area on sister class A station KGMM-CD (channel 24).

== KYVV-TV history ==
On July 10, 1991, the Federal Communications Commission (FCC) granted a construction permit to Republic Broadcasting Company for a new TV station on analog channel 10 in Del Rio. The company, headed by Thomas Robert Gilchrist, chose KTRG as call letters for the station. However, the station was not on air by December 1996, when the construction permit was sold to Ortiz Broadcasting Corporation. Under its ownership, channel 10 began broadcasting on September 1, 1997. On April 6, 1998, KTRG joined UPN. It also briefly aired a local newscast.

In May 1999, KTRG was switched to programming from the Faith Pleases God church owned by Ortiz (who also founded the Fe-TV and La Familia Network channels). This continued until 2005, when Ortiz Broadcasting Corporation took the station silent for financial reasons, having gone into bankruptcy. It was then sold to SATV 10, LLC, in 2006; this company was owned by Barbara Laurence. SATV10 undertook the lengthy process of finding a suitable site to resume operations, as the tower site lease was not included in the assets of the bankrupt estate. This was accomplished, but SATV10 filed for bankruptcy protection itself in 2009, emerging the next year.

In 2010, KTRG and another Laurence-owned station, KMCC in Laughlin, affiliated with VasalloVision, which they aired until August 13, 2012, when KYVV-TV (having changed its call letters to reflect the VasalloVision programming) became an affiliate of MundoFox (later MundoMax). The station went silent on May 12, 2016.

final logo under MundoMax affiliation

Stryker Media agreed to purchase KYVV-TV from SATV 10 for $450,000 on October 12, 2017. CNZ Communications, a sister company to Stryker, has operated the station under a local marketing agreement since June 26, 2017. The sale was completed on April 6, 2018. KYVV-TV returned to the air on July 1, 2018, as an affiliate of Grit.

Sometime in 2024, KYVV-TV changed its primary affiliation to Merit Street, with Grit moving to the station's second subchannel.

== Subchannels ==
The stations' signals are multiplexed:

=== KYVV-TV subchannels ===
Subchannels of KYVV-TV
Subchannel	Res.	Short name	Programming
10.1	1080i	ESTRELLA	Estrella TV
10.2	480i	Grit	Hot 97 TV (4:3)
10.3	480i	Buzzr	Buzzr (4:3)
10.4	480i	Majesta	Majestad TV (4:3)
10.5	480i	CRTV	Infomercials (4:3)
10.6	480i	SBN	SonLife (4:3)
10.7	480i	LATV	LATV (4:3)

=== KGMM-CD subchannels ===
Subchannels of KGMM-CD
Subchannel	Res.	Short name	Programming
10.1	720p	ESTV	Estrella TV
10.2	720p	Grit	Grit
10.3	480i	SBN	SonLife
10.4	720p	Hot97	Hot 97 TV
10.5	480i	BZZR	Buzzr
10.6	720p	JTV	Jewelry TV
10.7	480i	MariaES	Mariavision
10.9	480i	CRTV	Infomercials
10.10	480i	MariaV	Mariavision
