= KXPD-LP =

Television station in Eola, Oregon (2005–2009)

- Eola, Oregon; United States
- Channels: Analog: 52 (UHF)

Programming
- Affiliations: Main station for KWVT-LP (2005–2007); Azteca América (2007–2009)

Ownership
- Owner: Churchill Media; (Churchill Media II, LLC)

History
- First air date: May 20, 2005
- Last air date: December 30, 2009
- Former call signs: K52HY, KWVT-LP, KGUG-LP

Technical information
- Facility ID: 130036
- Class: TX
- ERP: 150 kW
- HAAT: 526 m (1,726 ft)
- Transmitter coordinates: 44°59′59.01″N 122°41′41.04″W

KXPD-LP (channel 52) was a low-power television station in Eola, Oregon, United States. The station covered the Willamette Valley from Salem to Wilsonville, within the Portland, Oregon, television market.

== History ==
The station signed on the air on May 20, 2005, as the main signal of KWVT-LP, a local, English-language independent station owned by Northwest Television. (The station has since relocated to channel 17.)

On May 8, 2007, Northwest Television sold the broadcast license of KWVT-LP to Churchill Media of Eugene, Oregon. Programming from Azteca América began August 17, 2007. The call letters were soon after changed to KXPD-LP.

On December 30, 2009, KXPD-LP went off the air citing "substantial decreases in its revenue flow" over the past three years. In its application to the Federal Communications Commission (FCC) for special temporary authority to remain silent, the station's license holder claimed that "losses have reached the point that the station no longer generates sufficient funds to pay operating expenses" and that the company was seeking to either sell the station or refinance and return to operation. However, the station never returned to air, and its license was soon canceled by the FCC.
