= VIETV =

American Vietnamese-language TV network

- Type: Digital broadcast and internet streaming television network
- Country: United States
- Headquarters: Houston, Texas

Programming
- Picture format: 4 x 6 cm (standard Vietnam photography size) or 2 x 2 inches

Ownership
- Key people: Kevin Ngo (CEO); Robert Pham (President)

History
- Launched: 2011
- Founder: Kevin Ngo

Links
- Website: www.vietv.com

VIETV is an American Vietnamese-language broadcast television network based in Houston, Texas. The network began broadcasting over-the-air in Houston in 2011, and has since started affiliates broadcasting in Los Angeles, California, Orange County, California, San Francisco, California, San Jose, California, Dallas, Texas, Atlanta, Georgia, Philadelphia, Pennsylvania, Boston, Massachusetts, and Washington, D.C. The Houston, Dallas, Los Angeles, and San Jose affiliates are also available in live streaming video on the Vietv.com website, and the network has created the UNO IP IPTV set-top box for viewing their content on televisions outside their broadcast area.

VIETV has six studios, including their headquarters in Houston and locations in Southern California, Northern California, Boston, and Philadelphia. Original programming on VIETV includes the Evening NEWS and NEWS @ Nite programs, the It's Your Birthday children's show, Cooking with Chef Cam-Yuet, Beauty by Tiffani, World Travel, and The Law & Legal Issues, hosted by VIETV president Robert Pham.

== History ==
VAN-TV 55.6 was the first Vietnamese language in Houston, established in May 2009 originally via KTBU subchannel 55.2. It then was sold in 2015 to VietV because the founders, Ban Vu and Bich Ngoc Nguyen (Vicky Vu) wanted to retire.

== Affiliates ==
Market	Callsign	Channel
Los Angeles	KDOC-TV	56.6
Houston	KUBE-TV	57.11
San Francisco / San Jose	KCNS-TV	38.3
San Francisco / San Jose	KSCZ-LD	16.4
Boston	WMFP	62.3
Washington, D.C.	WWTD-LD	49.4
Tulsa, Oklahoma	KZLL-LD	39.5
