= KVVV-TV =

Television station in Galveston, Texas (1968–1969)

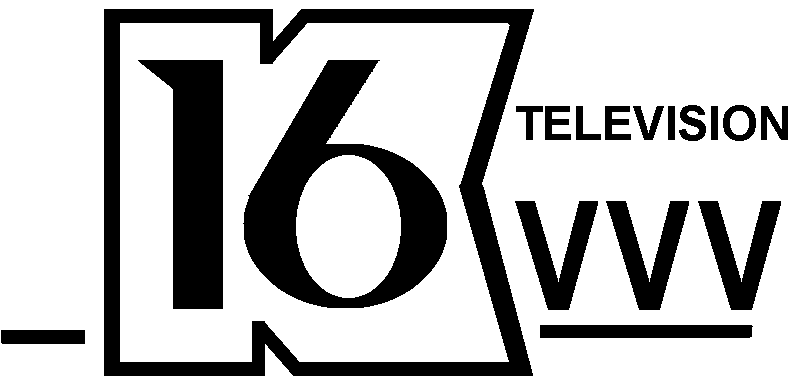

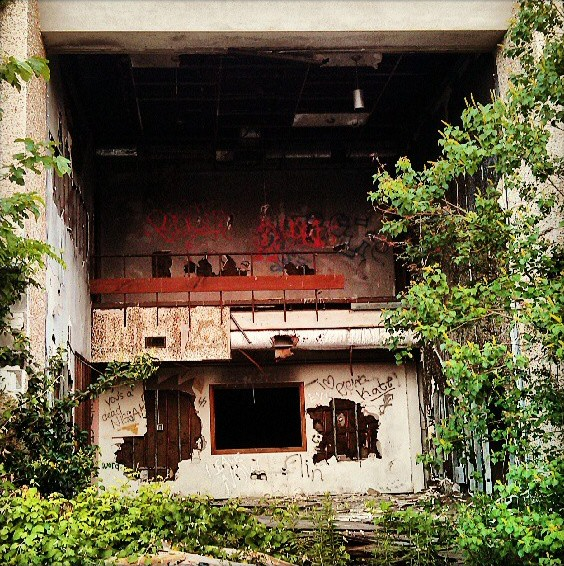
- A 2013 photo of the KVVV building
- Galveston–Houston, Texas; United States
- City: Galveston, Texas
- Channels: Analog: 16 (UHF)

Programming
- Affiliations: Independent

Ownership
- Owner: TVue Associates

History
- First air date: March 18, 1968
- Last air date: August 31, 1969 (1 year, 166 days)

Technical information
- ERP: 3,390 kW
- HAAT: 335 m (1,100 ft)
- Transmitter coordinates: 29°28′03″N 95°13′09″W

KVVV-TV (channel 16) was an independent television station licensed to Galveston, Texas, United States, which served the Houston area. Owned by TVue Associates, the station maintained studios on Lundy Lane in Friendswood, at FM 528, four miles (6 km) north of Alvin.

== History ==
KVVV signed on March 18, 1968, operating at 3.39 megawatts of power. Prior to the station signing on, controlling stockholder Roy O. Beach Jr. stored the station's original transmitter in the basement of a building across the street from the 1920s Cotton Exchange Building in Houston. Among the programs carried on KVVV were the locally originated children's program No-No the Clown and the Stock Market Observer during the day. KVVV also carried syndicated programming and Sundays were dedicated to Spanish-language programs and movies imported from Mexico.

By late 1968, much of the staff was laid off, and the stock market program was canceled. As a result, the station was generally on the air only in the afternoons and evenings—signing on between 2 pm and 3 pm, and signing off at 10 pm.

KVVV lost so much money in its only year in operation that the owners closed the station on August 31, 1969. Negoations to sell the station to either Time Life Television or Taft Broadcasting have failed. While a group led by Fred Hofheinz was reported to be in talks to buy KVVV in 1970, no deal emerged, and the construction permit was canceled on April 23, 1971. The equipment and tower used by KVVV were eventually sold to a new PBS member station in Corpus Christi, KEDT (also on channel 16), which signed on in 1972. The assignment of channel 16 to Corpus Christi was made to allow KEDT's owners to avoid costs in converting the equipment to run on channel 38.

As of October 2006, the building and some of the furnishings were still there, though it was vandalized and in poor condition.

In later years, KFGY used the KVVV calls on FM radio, while KUBE-TV used the KVVV calls when they were affiliated with Value Vision. Today, the KVVV call letters are now being used for an unrelated low-power station.
