= KCWK =

Television station in Walla Walla, Washington (2001–2008)

- Walla Walla–Dayton–; Richland–Pasco–Kennewick, Washington; United States
- City: Walla Walla, Washington
- Channels: Analog: 9 (VHF)

Programming
- Affiliations: Independent (2001–2003); Azteca América (2003–2006); The CW (2006–2008)

Ownership
- Owner: Pappas Telecasting Companies; (KCWK License, LLC)

History
- First air date: March 23, 2001
- Last air date: May 25, 2008
- Former call signs: KBKI (2001–2003); KAZW-TV (2003–2006)
- Call sign meaning: The CW Yakima

Technical information
- Licensing authority: FCC
- Facility ID: 84238
- ERP: 316 kW
- HAAT: 436 m (1,430 ft)
- Transmitter coordinates: 45°59′21.9″N 118°10′34.8″W
- Translator(s): KCWK-LP 27 Yakima

Links
- Public license information: Public file; LMS

KCWK (channel 9) was a television station licensed to Walla Walla, Washington, United States. Owned by Pappas Telecasting, it was most recently affiliated with The CW, and had a low-power repeater (KCWK-LP, channel 27) in Yakima. The station operated from 2001 to 2008, shutting down following the bankruptcy of Pappas.

== History ==
The station went on air for the first time on March 23, 2001, as KBKI. In 2003, it changed its call sign to KAZW-TV and became affiliated with the Spanish-language Azteca América network. It was mainly targeted at the Hispanic community in Central Washington.

On April 24, 2006, it was announced that KAZW would launch a CW affiliate on digital subchannel 9.2, with programming being provided by The CW Plus. However, the station, which did not have a digital signal, subsequently changed its plans and chose to completely replace Azteca América with The CW, citing better marketing potential. Mike Angelos, vice president of corporate communications for Pappas Telecasting, stated that while the Yakima Valley has a 40 percent Hispanic population, the numbers were not high enough to reach the level needed for Azteca América. The call letters were changed to KCWK in August 2006 to reflect the new affiliation.

On May 10, 2008, KCWK, along with 12 other Pappas stations, filed for Chapter 11 bankruptcy. On May 25, 2008, KCWK went off the air; four days later, the station's offices were found to be empty.

On July 18, 2008, KCWK reported to the Federal Communications Commission (FCC) that digital television equipment needed in time for the upcoming 2009 digital transition had not yet been obtained, as this could not be done without prior approval of the bankruptcy court. The station had applied to extend the digital construction permit necessary to retain the broadcast license, but due to both equipment failure and financial hardship, it was expected that the station's silent analog signal would not return.

KCWK was one of two Pappas stations required to both end analog broadcasting and install new equipment to begin digital transmission (a flash-cut) on the 2009 DTV deadline. As full-service stations established after digital companion channels were assigned to existing full-service broadcasters, KCWK and Pappas-owned WWAZ-TV in Fond du Lac, Wisconsin, had no existing digital transmitter facilities. KCWK remained silent, while Pappas negotiated several items with the FCC and ABC Owned Television Stations to allow WWAZ to return to the air eventually as WIWN while ABC's WLS-TV took its former digital channel slot to provide UHF digital television service to Chicago. All other full-service Pappas television stations had been simulcasting in both analog and digital formats long before the company entered Chapter 11 bankruptcy and therefore had sufficient equipment on hand to continue to broadcast their signals digitally in 2009.

On January 16, 2009, it was announced that several Pappas stations, including the license for KCWK, would be sold to New World TV Group, after the sale received United States bankruptcy court approval. That February, Fisher Communications announced that their CBS affiliates KIMA-TV and KEPR-TV would each launch CW subchannels on March 31, 2009. The KCWK license was canceled by the FCC on June 2, 2009, and the KCWK-LP license was canceled on June 22, 2010.

== Digital television ==
The station did not receive a companion channel for a digital television station, because it was granted an original construction permit after the FCC finalized the DTV allotment plan on April 21, 1997. Instead, KCWK would have been required to turn off its analog signal and turn on its digital signal (called a "flash-cut") on or before the 2009 end of the digital TV conversion period for full-service stations. As KCWK did not acquire its digital transmitter and antenna, it was unable to complete the mandatory digital transition and never resumed broadcasting.

Low-powered satellite KCWK-LP had voluntarily filed for a digital "-LD" license on channel 36. That application has since been deleted from the FCC database.

== Translators ==
- KCWK-LP 27 Yakima
