= KMEG =

Television station in Sioux City, Iowa

- Sioux City, Iowa; United States
- Channels: Digital: 32 (UHF); Virtual: 14

Programming
- Affiliations: 14.1: Roar; for others, see § Technical information and subchannels

Ownership
- Owner: Sinclair Broadcast Group; (KPTH Licensee, LLC)
- Sister stations: KPTH

History
- First air date: September 5, 1967
- Former channel numbers: Analog: 14 (UHF, 1967–2009); Digital: 39 (UHF, until 2018)
- Former affiliations: CBS (1967–2021); Fox (secondary, 1989–1999); UPN (secondary, 1995 and 2004–2006); Dabl (2021–2025)
- Call sign meaning: Station broadcast with 1 megawatt when it went on air

Technical information
- Licensing authority: FCC
- Facility ID: 39665
- ERP: 1,000 kW
- HAAT: 611 m (2,005 ft)
- Transmitter coordinates: 42°35′12″N 96°13′19″W
- Translator(s): K18KG-D Spencer, IA; K23PU-D Norfolk, NE

Links
- Public license information: Public file; LMS
- Website: siouxlandnews.com

KMEG (channel 14) is a television station in Sioux City, Iowa, United States, airing programming from the digital multicast network Roar. It is owned by Sinclair Broadcast Group alongside Fox/CBS affiliate KPTH (channel 44). The two stations share studios along I-29 (postal address says Gold Circle) in Dakota Dunes, South Dakota; KMEG's transmitter is located northeast of Sioux City in Plymouth County, Iowa.

From its sign-on in 1967 to 2021, KMEG was the CBS affiliate in Sioux City. It was put on the air to provide the area with full three-network service for the first time. The station largely spent decades in third place under a succession of owners; it had no full-length local news programming from 1976 to 1999. KMEG briefly had the national spotlight in 1993 when its decision not to air the Late Show with David Letterman left Sioux City the only market where the show was not aired.

Waitt Broadcasting acquired KMEG in 1998. New studios were built in Dakota Dunes and a new news operation was started. In 2005, Waitt outsourced most station operations to KPTH owner Pappas Telecasting; that station changed hands in 2009 and again in 2013. CBS programming moved to a "CBS 14" subchannel of Sinclair-owned KPTH in 2021, leaving KMEG to broadcast national digital multicast television networks. Sinclair acquired the KMEG license in 2025.

== History ==
=== Early years ===
Medallion Broadcasters, Inc., applied to the Federal Communications Commission (FCC) in November 1966 seeking authority to build a television station on ultra high frequency (UHF) channel 14 in Sioux City. Medallion, a group of northwest Iowa residents, sought to bring the missing ABC network to Sioux City. The group was headed by Robert Donovan, longtime sales manager of one of the two existing stations in Sioux City, KVTV (channel 9, now KCAU-TV). The commission granted the application on February 15, 1967. Construction then began, with Medallion taking up space in a building at Seventh Street and Floyd Boulevard previously used by a coffee company. The call letters KMEG were selected to reflect that the station would broadcast with a megawatt, the first station in the region to do so. (Note: Robert Donovan, the president of Medallion, also had a daughter named Meg.)

While the station was in the construction phase, KVTV announced it would change network affiliations from CBS to ABC. Medallion then announced its intention to pursue the CBS affiliation for KMEG and signed an affiliation agreement.

KMEG began broadcasting on September 5, 1967, from a transmitter site on high ground east of Sioux City. Eighteen months after going on air, Medallion announced the sale of KMEG to John Fetzer; the FCC approved the deal and noted that Medallion had sustained heavy losses in starting up and running channel 14. However, much carried over from the station's founding ownership. Donovan remained with KMEG as station manager until 1983, while KMEG had still never turned a profit by 1976. Fetzer sold off all of his broadcasting properties in the mid-1980s. KMEG was sold along with WKZO-TV in Kalamazoo, Michigan, and Nebraska's KOLN/KGIN to Gillett Holdings in 1985.

=== Maine Radio and Television ownership ===
Gillett only owned KMEG for a year before selling it to the Maine Radio and Television Company, the owner of WCSH-TV in Portland, Maine, and WLBZ-TV in Bangor, Maine. President Fred Thompson noted that the family-owned broadcaster chose KMEG for its first expansion outside New England because it was "small, controllable and affordable". KMEG was a secondary affiliate of Fox beginning in 1989 and was also a secondary affiliate of the United Paramount Network (UPN) for the first eight months of 1995, dropping UPN when it refused to carry programming beyond Star Trek: Voyager. It also had a local kids club with host Tim Poppen, who had previously hosted the children's show Puppen's Place on the station. The return of the NFL to CBS in 1998 after four years without caused KMEG to drop its coverage of the NFL on Fox.

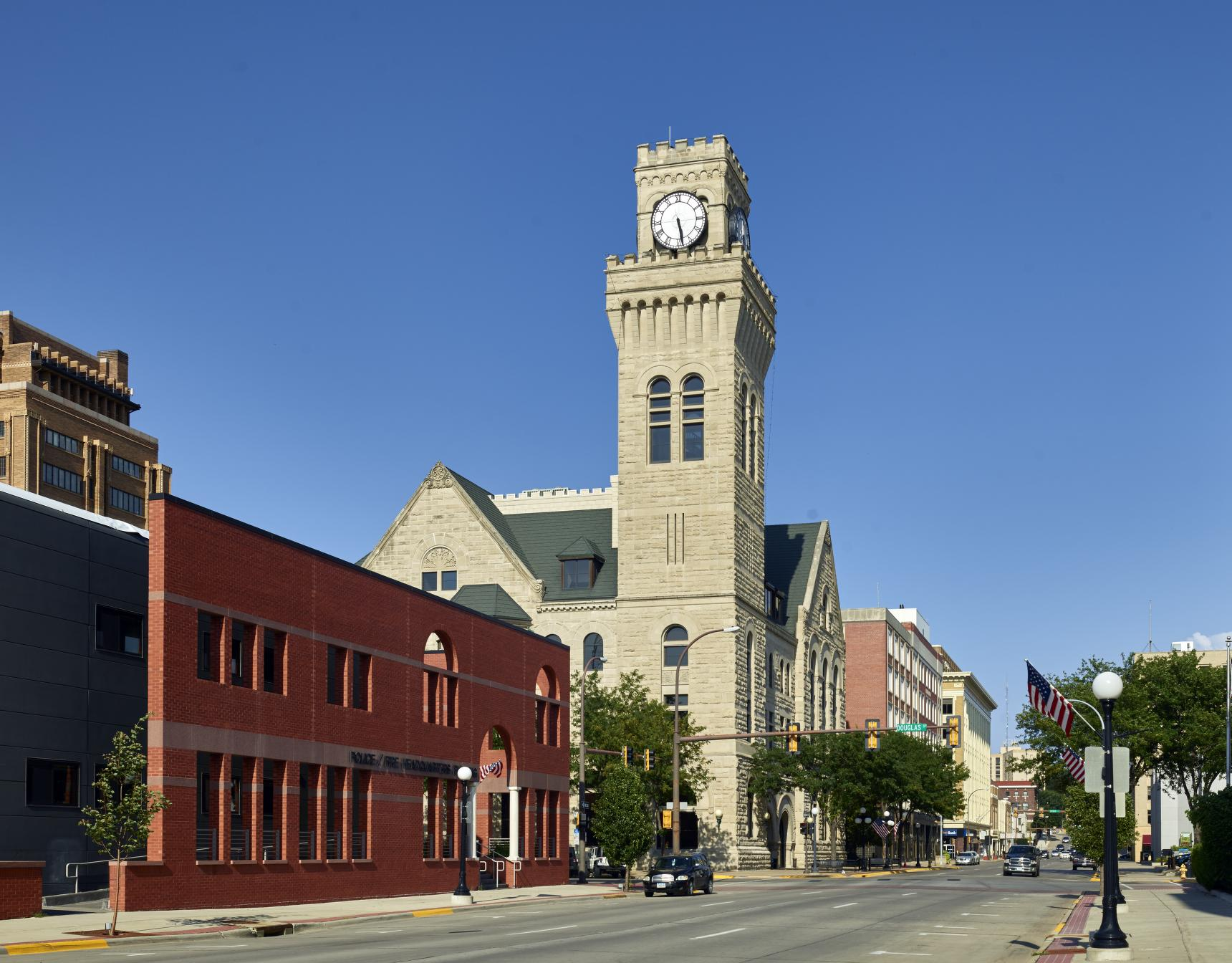
The Sioux City City Hall, rebuilt in 1997

In 1993, CBS debuted the Late Show with David Letterman. The new late night show was in a time slot that the affiliates previously programmed with syndicated programming. In August, KMEG announced it would not carry the new network offering because its lineup in the so-called late fringe timeslot—Cheers and Star Trek—was strong and Letterman's Late Night show on NBC had not done well in the ratings locally. On Letterman's first CBS show, he designated Sioux City the program's "home office", likely because it was the only market nationwide where the show was not carried. Sioux City officials capitalized by designating the "home office" to be the city's abandoned city hall and naming Letterman an honorary citizen. After one season, KMEG began to air the program beginning in September 1994; the "home office" formally left Iowa in 1995.

=== Waitt Broadcasting ownership; sale to Sinclair ===
After decades of broadcasting, the Rines-Thompson family that owned Maine Radio and Television Company made the decision in the late 1990s to exit the business. The two Maine television stations were sold to Gannett in 1997; the next year, a deal was reached to sell KMEG to Waitt Broadcasting, a company owned by Norm Waitt Jr. Waitt had co-founded computing company Gateway, Inc. and was making an entry into broadcasting by buying KOTD-FM serving Omaha and KMEG as his first media properties. The company then acquired additional television and radio stations in Iowa, Alabama, and Florida between 1998 and 1999.

Waitt made significant investments in its first years of owning KMEG. It moved its antenna to a tower being built by a new Siouxland television station, KPTH (channel 44), to improve its signal quality. Ground was broken in September 1999 on studios in Dakota Dunes, South Dakota, where Waitt maintained a home and an office; the facility would house KMEG and Waitt-owned KZSR (102.3 FM). Under Waitt, the station returned to a secondary affiliation with UPN by 2004.

In May 2005, Waitt Broadcasting entered into a shared services agreement with Pappas Telecasting, owner of KPTH. Pappas assumed operations of KMEG and moved KPTH into the Dakota Dunes studios from its offices in South Sioux City, Nebraska. In November 2007, Waitt announced it would sell KMEG to Siouxland Television, LLC, with Pappas continuing to operate it as part of the deal. However, KPTH was among the company's stations which filed for Chapter 11 bankruptcy protection in May 2008. As a result, the sale of KMEG to Siouxland Television fell through. On January 16, 2009, it was announced that several of the Pappas stations involved in the bankruptcy (including KPTH) would be sold to New World TV Group (also known as Titan Broadcast Management or Titan TV Broadcast Group) after the transaction received United States bankruptcy court approval; New World/Titan also took over their operations while the sale was completed.

Titan announced the sale of most of its stations, including KPTH, to the Sinclair Broadcast Group on June 3, 2013. Sinclair announced the closing of the sale on October 3.

In January 2021, Sinclair renewed its CBS affiliation agreement, with KPTH—instead of KMEG—listed as the Sioux City affiliate. On February 4, the CBS 14 subchannel of KMEG, including its programming and local news, moved to KPTH 44.3, requiring a rescan for over-the-air viewers; KMEG's 14.1 subchannel began broadcasting Dabl.

KMEG's last logo as a CBS affiliate, used until 2021.

On July 28, 2021, the FCC issued a forfeiture order stemming from a lawsuit against KMEG owner Waitt Broadcasting. The order came six months after KMEG lost its CBS affiliation. The lawsuit, filed by AT&T, alleged that Waitt failed to negotiate for retransmission consent in good faith for KMEG. Owners of other Sinclair-managed stations, such as Deerfield Media, were also named in the lawsuit. Waitt was ordered to pay a fine of $512,228. Sinclair acquired KMEG outright from Waitt for $500,000 in a 2025 deal, creating a legal duopoly with KPTH. In August 2025, KMEG became a Roar affiliate.

== News operation ==
When it signed on, KMEG broadcast newscasts under the name Newsbeat 14. It made little headway in the ratings, however; by the time channel 14 was on the air, Sioux City viewers already had formed news habits watching long-established KTIV and KCAU-TV. In 1976, station manager Donovan—with the support of Fetzer management—made the decision to cease producing traditional local newscasts, with a three-person staff kept on to produce public affairs programming and documentaries. Gillett briefly evaluated returning KMEG's news department to a full-size news operation upon purchasing the station, though at the time advertising revenues for TV stations were depressed throughout Iowa. In 1993, the station began airing regular weather updates, including the hiring of two meteorologists to produce custom forecasts.

Immediately upon buying KMEG, Waitt Broadcasting announced its intention to pursue the return of local news to channel 14; Waitt declared, "One of the first things we're going to do is take a good hard look at what it would take to develop a first-rate local news operation." Even with the Dakota Dunes studio in the design concept stage, it was decided to begin producing a newscast from the existing Sioux City studios. Local newscasts at 6 and 10 p.m. debuted on August 24, 1999. However, the station continued to struggle. In 2004, it fired most of its existing news anchors and canceled its weekend newscasts.

The 2005 merger of KMEG and KPTH's operations led to the announcement that KMEG would extend its news operation to channel 44. Weekend newscasts were eliminated on both stations as a cost-cutting move when Titan assumed control of the Pappas stations in March 2009; the KPTH newscast had only just been expanded to weekends in January.

The news operation migrated exclusively to subchannels of KPTH with the 2021 move of the CBS affiliation. Sinclair discontinued local newscasts in Sioux City in May 2023.

== Technical information and subchannels ==
KMEG's transmitter is located northeast of Sioux City in Plymouth County, Iowa. Its signal is multiplexed:

Subchannels of KMEG
Subchannel	Res.	Short name	Programming
14.1	480i	ROAR	Roar
14.2	480i	Charge!	Charge!
14.3	480i	Comet	Comet
14.4	480i	TheNest	The Nest
14.5	720p	CHSN	Chicago Sports Network

=== Analog-to-digital conversion ===
KMEG shut down its analog signal, over UHF channel 14, at noon on February 17, 2009, which had originally been the date of the federally mandated transition from analog to digital television. The station's digital signal remained on its pre-transition UHF channel 39, using virtual channel 14. The station switched to broadcasting on channel 32 on November 30, 2018, as a result of the 2016 United States wireless spectrum auction.

=== Translators ===
KMEG's signal is repeated over two translators:

- Spencer: K18KG-D
- Norfolk, NE: K23PU-D
