= KPTH =

Television station in Sioux City, Iowa

- Sioux City, Iowa; United States
- Channels: Digital: 30 (UHF); Virtual: 44
- Branding: Fox Siouxland; MyTV Siouxland (44.2); CBS Siouxland (44.3)

Programming
- Affiliations: 44.1: Fox; 44.2: The Nest/MyNetworkTV; 44.3: CBS

Ownership
- Owner: Sinclair Broadcast Group; (KPTH Licensee, LLC)
- Sister stations: KMEG

History
- First air date: May 9, 1999
- Former channel numbers: Analog: 44 (UHF, 1999–2009); Digital: 49 (UHF, 2009–2018)
- Call sign meaning: Pappas Telecasting of the Heartland, from founding owner

Technical information
- Licensing authority: FCC
- Facility ID: 77451
- ERP: 871 kW
- HAAT: 613 m (2,011 ft)
- Transmitter coordinates: 42°35′12″N 96°13′19″W

Links
- Public license information: Public file; LMS
- Website: siouxlandnews.com

KPTH (channel 44) is a television station in Sioux City, Iowa, United States, affiliated with Fox and CBS. It is owned by Sinclair Broadcast Group alongside KMEG (channel 14). The two stations share studios along I-29 (postal address says Gold Circle) in Dakota Dunes, South Dakota; KPTH's transmitter is located northeast of Sioux City in Plymouth County, Iowa.

KPTH has been the Fox affiliate for Sioux City since its construction by Pappas Telecasting in 1999. Its operations were merged with KMEG, then the CBS affiliate, in 2005. After Pappas filed for bankruptcy protection, the station was sold to Titan TV Broadcast Management in 2009 and again to Sinclair in 2013. KPTH absorbed the CBS programming previously on KMEG in 2021. KPTH aired local news from 2006 to 2023.

== History ==
Pappas Telecasting received a construction permit to build a new station in Sioux City on February 25, 1997, immediately announcing that it planned to put KPTH on the air as a Fox affiliate in early 1998. Work on the tower site in Plymouth County began that October.

KPTH began broadcasting May 9, 1999. It operated from offices in South Sioux City, Nebraska, and broadcast from an interim antenna at the 1,500-foot (460 m) level of its planned 2,000-foot (610 m) tower for the first five months. The high-power facility was necessary because two thirds of television households in the Sioux City market lived outside the metropolitan area. It also provided tower space for KMEG and for the digital facilities of KTIV and Iowa Public Television transmitter KSIN.

In May 2005, Waitt Broadcasting (owner of KMEG) entered into a shared services agreement with Pappas Telecasting. Pappas assumed operations of KMEG and moved KPTH into the former's studios in Dakota Dunes, South Dakota. In November 2007, Waitt announced it would sell KMEG to Siouxland Television, LLC, with Pappas continuing to operate it as part of the deal. However, Pappas' Sioux City duopoly was among the company's thirteen stations which filed for Chapter 11 bankruptcy protection in May 2008. As a result, the sale of KMEG to Siouxland Television fell through. On January 16, 2009, it was announced that several of the Pappas stations involved in the bankruptcy (including KPTH) would be sold to New World TV Group (also known as Titan Broadcast Management or Titan TV Broadcast Group) after the transaction received United States bankruptcy court approval; New World/Titan also took over their operations while the sale was completed.

Titan announced the sale of most of its stations, including KPTH, to the Sinclair Broadcast Group on June 3, 2013. Sinclair announced the closing of the sale on October 3.

In January 2021, Sinclair renewed its CBS affiliation agreement, with KPTH—instead of KMEG—listed as the Sioux City affiliate. On February 4, the CBS 14 subchannel of KMEG, including its programming and local news, moved to KPTH 44.3; KMEG's 14.1 subchannel began broadcasting Dabl.

== News operation ==
KPTH had promised newscasts at launch, but a 2000 attempt by Pappas to sell the station led to the postponement of any plans to launch local news. The 2005 merger of KMEG and KPTH's operations led to the announcement that KMEG would extend its news operation to channel 44. Weekend newscasts were eliminated on both stations as a cost-cutting move when Titan assumed control of the Pappas stations in March 2009; the KPTH newscast had only just been expanded to weekends in January.

In April 2023, it was reported that Sinclair would cut its local newscasts in five markets, including Sioux City, effective in May; the lost newscasts would be replaced with Sinclair's syndicated The National Desk.

== Subchannels ==
KPTH's transmitter is located northeast of Sioux City in Plymouth County, Iowa. The station's signal is multiplexed:

Subchannels of KPTH
Subchannel	Res.	Short name	Programming
44.1	720p	FOX	Fox
44.2	480i	MyNet	The Nest & MyNetworkTV (4:3)
44.3	1080i	CBS 14	CBS

=== Analog-to-digital conversion ===
KPTH shut down its analog signal, over UHF channel 44, at noon on February 17, 2009, to conclude the federally mandated transition from analog to digital television.

The station's digital signal remained on its pre-transition UHF channel 49, using virtual channel 44. KPTH switched to broadcasting on channel 30 on November 30, 2018, as a result of the 2016 United States wireless spectrum auction.

=== Translators ===
KPTH's signal is repeated over translator KBVK-LD (channel 20) in Spencer, Iowa. It was formerly relayed on KPTP-LD (channel 31) in Norfolk, Nebraska; this translator's license was canceled on August 5, 2010.
