= KUBE-TV =

Television station in Baytown, Texas

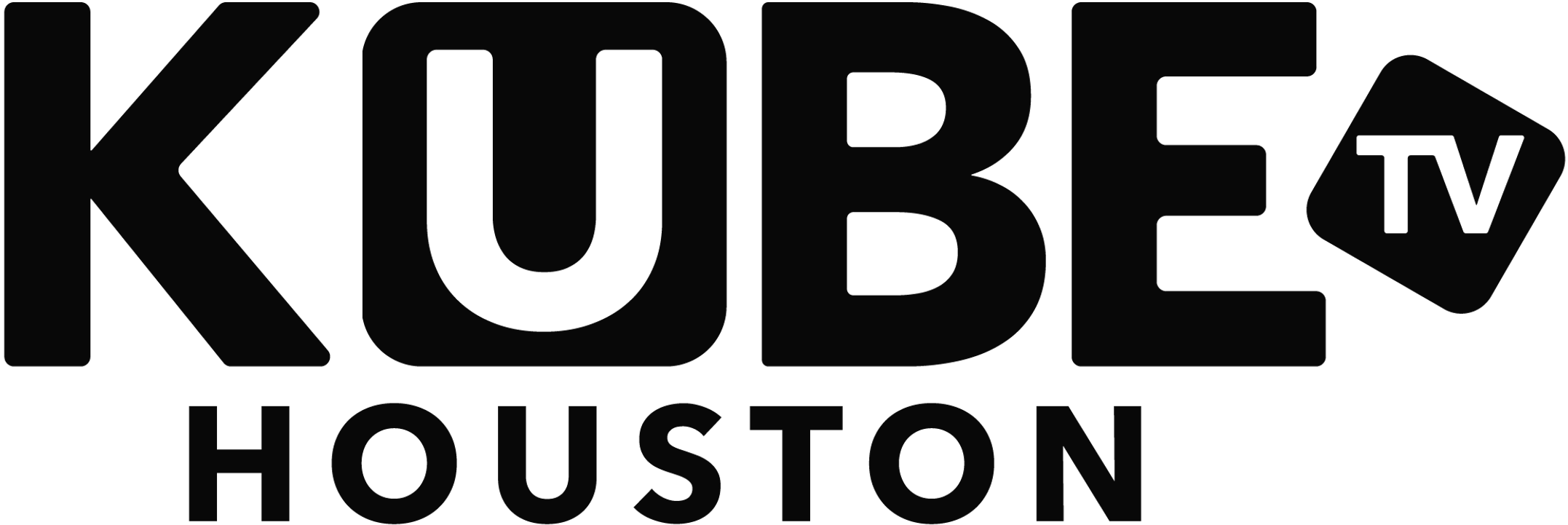
- Baytown–Houston, Texas; United States
- City: Baytown, Texas
- Channels: Digital: 31 (UHF); Virtual: 57
- Branding: KUBE-TV Houston

Programming
- Affiliations: 57.1: Shop LC; for others, see § Subchannels

Ownership
- Owner: WRNN-TV Associates; (RNN National, LLC)

History
- First air date: May 18, 1988
- Former call signs: KLTJ (1988–1989); KRTW (1989–1994); KVVV (1994–2000); KAZH (2000–2010)
- Former channel numbers: Analog: 57 (UHF, 1988–2009); Digital: 41 (UHF, 2002–2019)
- Former affiliations: Religious independent (1988–1994); Valuevision (1994–2000); FamilyNet (2000–2002); Azteca América (2002–2007); TuVisión (2007–2009); VasalloVision (2009–2010); Independent (2010–2021); ShopHQ (2021–2023)
- Call sign meaning: From the "KUBE" branding (pronounced "cube"); -or-; U. Bertram "Bert" Ellis Jr.

Technical information
- Licensing authority: FCC
- Facility ID: 70492
- ERP: 1,000 kW; 600 kW (STA)
- HAAT: 580 m (1,903 ft); 508 m (1,667 ft) (STA)
- Transmitter coordinates: 29°34′16″N 95°30′38″W

Links
- Public license information: Public file; LMS

KUBE-TV (channel 57) is a television station licensed to Baytown, Texas, United States, serving the Houston area and owned by WRNN-TV Associates. KUBE-TV's studios are located on Fountain View Drive and Burgoyne Road on Houston's southwest side, and its transmitter is located near Missouri City, in unincorporated northeastern Fort Bend County.

== History ==
=== Early history ===
The station first signed on the air on May 18, 1988, under the callsign KLTJ; it was founded by Eldred Thomas, who had earlier built radio station KVTT-FM (now KKXT) and television station KLTJ (now KSTR-TV) in Dallas. The station originally operated from studios located in Pasadena and a tower in Anahuac, and initially aired religious programs from a variety of sources, including the PTL Satellite Network, Christian Television Network and the Three Angels Broadcasting Network. The low-power signal and distance from Houston led to reception issues in the northern and western portions of the city; as a result, on May 18, 1989, Thomas moved the KLTJ programming and call letters to channel 22 on a tower based in Alvin. With the move of the KLTJ calls to channel 22, channel 57 changed its callsign to KRTW. It later changed its call letters to KVVV (a callsign formerly used on now-defunct channel 16 from 1968 to 1969) in 1994, when it switched to home shopping programming from Valuevision; it then became a FamilyNet affiliate as KAZH in 2000.

During its time as KAZH, the station was rebroadcast in Houston on translators KHMV-CA (channel 28) and KVVV-LP (channel 53); both of these translators were taken off the air in November 2007, due to owner Pappas Telecasting's ongoing financial problems (KHMV-CA was sold to Uniglobe Central America Network LLC on March 10, 2010, and currently broadcasts under the call sign KUGB-CD; KVVV-LP was spun off to a liquidation trust and returned to the air in digital format in January 2012).

=== As a Spanish-language station ===
In 2002, KAZH affiliated with Spanish-language network Azteca América. Early in 2007, then-owner Pappas Telecasting terminated KAZH's affiliation agreement with Azteca América, effective July 1. Azteca América programming moved to a low-powered station, KUVM-CA, on June 30, 2007; and later, to another full-powered station, KYAZ (channel 51). KAZH then joined Pappas' independent Spanish-language network, TuVisión.

On May 10, 2008, thirteen of Pappas' stations, including KAZH, filed for Chapter 11 bankruptcy protection. Pappas cited "the extremely difficult business climate for television stations across the country" in papers filed with the U.S. Bankruptcy Court in Wilmington, Delaware. Pappas was later ordered on September 10, 2008, to sell off the affected stations by February 15, 2009. In January 2009, the Pappas stations involved in the bankruptcy auction, including KAZH, were sold to New World TV Group, after the sale received bankruptcy court approval. On October 22, 2009, KAZH became the first affiliate of VasalloVision, a new network founded by Carlos Vasallo and Miguel Banojian; this followed the closure of TuVisión.

=== As an English-language independent station ===
First logo as "The KUBE", used from 2010 to 2018

Citing a larger advertising market, the station changed to an English-language general entertainment independent format on September 27, 2010. The station's call sign changed to KUBE-TV on the same date.

On January 18, 2013, NRJ TV announced that it would acquire KUBE-TV from New World TV Group for $19 million, as part of a two-station deal that also included San Francisco sister station KTNC-TV.

Syndicated programming in this era included The Doctors, Seinfeld, Hot Bench, Family Guy, and Bob's Burgers, among others. During the 2017 season, KUBE was the home of the MLS club Houston Dynamo. Until 2019, the station carried NCAA college football and men's basketball games from the Atlantic Coast Conference (ACC).

=== Sale to RNN ===
Second logo, as "KUBE 57", from 2018 to 2020

On December 9, 2019, it was announced that WRNN-TV Associates, owner of New York City–based WRNN-TV, secured a deal to purchase seven full-power TV stations (including KUBE-TV) and one Class A station from NRJ. The sale was approved by the FCC on January 23, and was completed on February 4, 2020.

On May 20, 2021, RNN and iMedia Brands announced an agreement to affiliate most of RNN's television stations (including KUBE) with home shopping network ShopHQ. KUBE began carrying ShopHQ programming on June 28, 2021.

Most of KUBE's syndicated programs have either moved to other Houston TV stations or are no longer cleared in the market. H-Town High School Sports is now seen Saturdays at 10:30 p.m. on KIAH since August 21, 2021. Reruns of Seinfeld from 7 to 8 p.m. were the last remaining holdover as the main channel transitioned to ShopHQ almost full-time.

Sometime in 2023, KUBE switched to airing programming from Shop LC.

== Programming ==
KUBE-TV airs Shop LC programming for most of its broadcast schedule, with all other content also remotely added from the New York area, including WRNN's Richard French Live and a Telco Productions–provided block of educational programming.

== Technical information ==
=== Subchannels ===
The station's signal is multiplexed:

Subchannels of KUBE-TV
Subchannel	Res.	Short name	Programming
57.1	720p	KUBE-TV	Shop LC
57.2	480i	ACE TV	Ace TV
57.3	480i	SBTN	SBTN
57.4	480i	ShopLC	Shop LC
57.5	480i	KUBE.5	Havass (Spanish infomercials)
57.6	480i	Mi Raza	Mi Raza TV (in Spanish)
57.7	480i	VietSky	VietSky
57.8	480i	JTV	Jewelry TV
57.9	480i	QVC365	QVC 365
57.10	480i	KUBE.10	[Blank]
57.11	480i	VieTV	VIETV (in Vietnamese)

During the 2011 Houston Livestock Show and Rodeo, KUBE-TV added programming from PegasusTV on subchannel 57.4; this was replaced by MeTV in 2012. Cozi TV was added to 57.4 on May 28, 2018, and was replaced by Charge! in June 2021.

=== Analog-to-digital conversion ===
KUBE-TV (as KAZH) ended regular programming on its analog signal, over UHF channel 57, on June 12, 2009, as part of the federally mandated transition from analog to digital television. The station's digital signal remained on its pre-transition UHF channel 41, using virtual channel 57.
