= KHLM-LD =

Television station in Houston

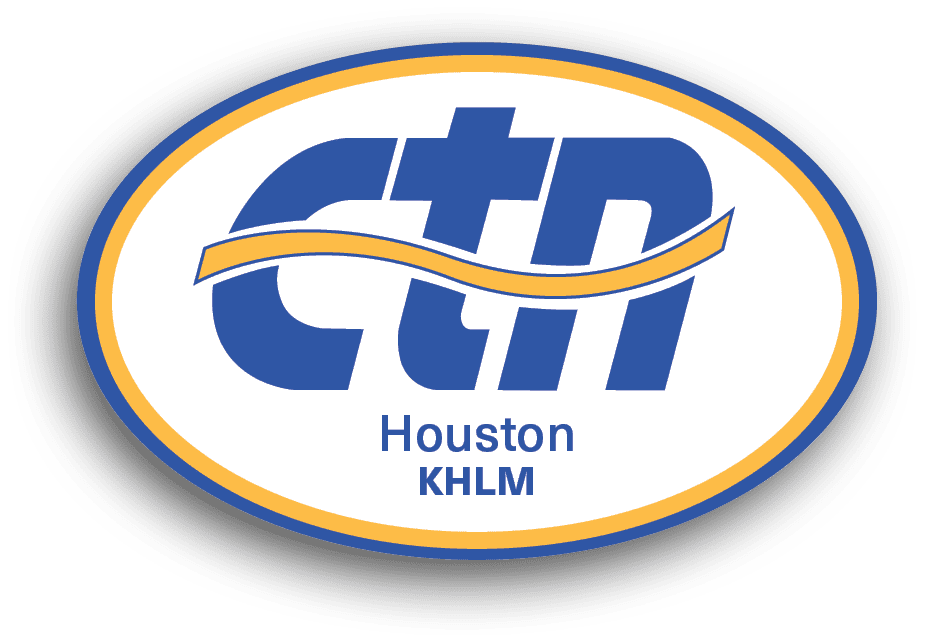
- Houston, Texas; United States
- Channels: Digital: 10 (VHF), shared with KUVM-LD; Virtual: 12
- Branding: CTN Houston

Programming
- Affiliations: 12.1: CTN; 12.2: CTN International

Ownership
- Owner: Christian Television Network; (Christian Television Corporation, Inc.)

History
- Founded: November 7, 1996
- Former call signs: KHLM-LP (1997–2009)
- Former channel numbers: Analog: 43 (UHF, 1996–2009); Digital: 43 (UHF, 2009–2021); Virtual: 43 (2009–2021)
- Former affiliations: Multimedios (1997–2021); NewsNet (2021)
- Call sign meaning: "Houston Lotus Multimedios" (former owner and affiliation)

Technical information
- Licensing authority: FCC
- Facility ID: 57189
- Class: LD
- ERP: 3 kW
- HAAT: 439.1 m (1,441 ft)
- Transmitter coordinates: 29°33′45.2″N 95°30′35.9″W

Links
- Public license information: LMS
- Website: www.ctnhouston.com

KHLM-LD (channel 12) is a low-power religious television station in Houston, Texas, United States, owned by the Christian Television Network. The station's transmitter is located near Missouri City, in unincorporated northeastern Fort Bend County.

== History ==
In its early years, this station did not broadcast a TV service at all. Instead, it was used to run an Internet service provider called AccelerNet, which delivered the downstream part of the service using UHF channel 43 and the upstream using a traditional dial-up modem or ISDN line.

Prior to 2021, KHLM-LD was the American flagship of the Mexican network Multimedios, and coordinated many of that network's talent appearances around the Houston area and southern Texas. Its local programming was also carried over the American feed of the network for cable and satellite providers, replacing Mexico-specific content.

The station temporarily ceased over-the-air broadcasting as of December 1, 2018, in preparation for the broadcast band repack in 2019 and a re-sort from UHF channel 43 onto VHF channel 10. KHLM-LD's main channel carrying Multimedios Houston is still available as a basic offering on most of the area's cable providers.

On June 4, 2021, it was announced that Lotus Communications would sell KHLM-LD to the Christian Television Network for $1.1 million. The sale was completed on August 18.

== Subchannels ==
Subchannels of KHLM-LD and KUVM-LD
License	Subchannel	Res.	Short name	Programming
KHLM-LD	12.1	720p	KHLM-LD	CTN
KHLM-LD	12.2	480i	KHLMLD2	CTN International
KUVM-LD	10.1	480i	KUVM-LD	Defy
KUVM-LD	10.2	480i	KUVMLD2	SonLife
KUVM-LD	10.3	480i	KUVMLD3	365BLK
KUVM-LD	10.4	480i	KUVMLD4	Outlaw
