= Carlos Vasallo =

Spanish businessman and audiovisual producer

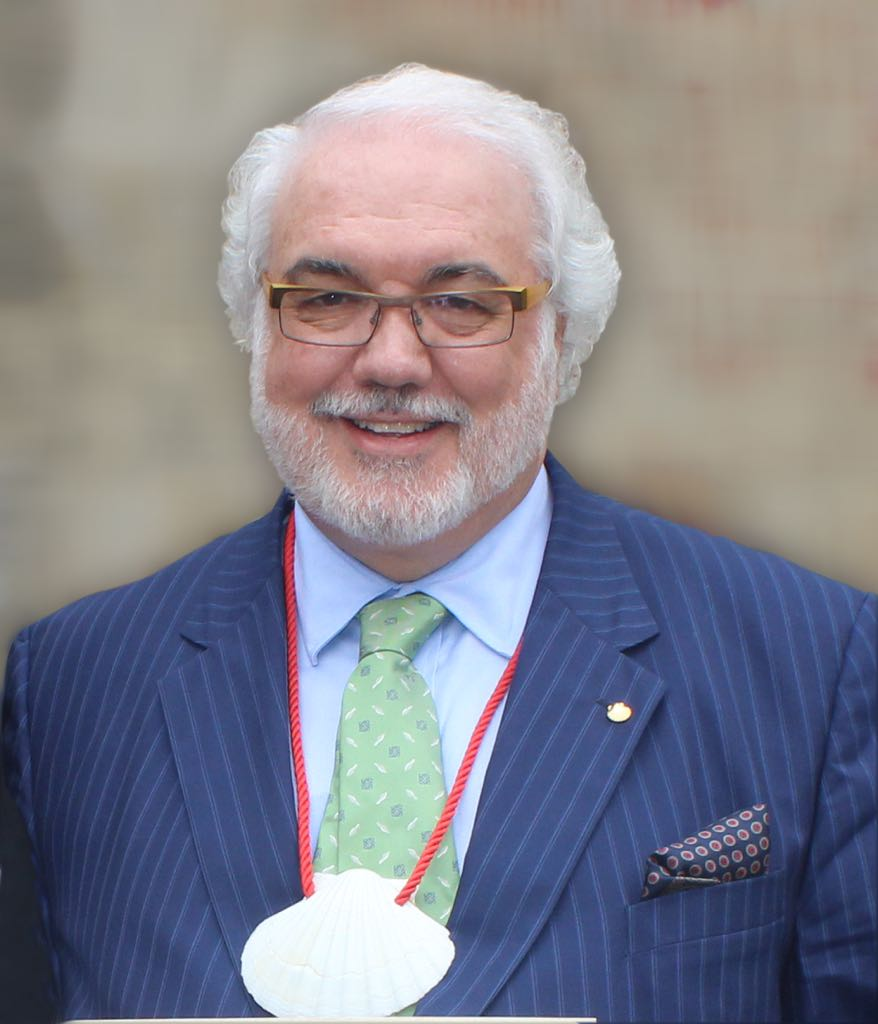
- Born: Carlos Luis Vasallo Tomé; 18 October 1950 (age 75); Valencia, Spain
- Other names: Carlos Vasallo
- Occupations: actor, audiovisual producer, and CEO America Teve Channel 41
- Years active: Since 1965
- Employer: VasalloVision
- Television: America Teve Channel 41
- Spouse(s): Tere Velázquez (div), Susana Dosamantes (div)
- Children: Kenia Vasallo, Carlos Vasallo, Julia Vasallo
- Parents: Jesús Vasallo Ramos (father); María del Rosario Tomé Alonso (mother)
- Family: Paulina Rubio

Carlos Luis Vasallo Tomé (born 18 October 1950 in Valencia) is a Spanish businessman and audiovisual producer resident in Miami.

== Biography ==
Carlos Luis Vasallo Tomé was born on 18 October 1950 in Valencia, Spain. He was one of the eight children of the Spanish writer and also screenwriter Jesús Vasallo (1919–1993). His father was from Ciudad Rodrigo (Castile and León), and her mother from Teixeiro (Galicia). At 14, he settled in Madrid to work in theater and cinema. Soon he started producing, and moved to Mexico. He was married the Mexican actresses, Tere Velázquez and Susana Dosamantes. Now, he lives in Miami.

Carlos Vasallo founded VasalloVision, and is the presidente and CEO of América CV Network, América TeVe, TeVeo, and Radio Caracol 1260 am. He is also the largest owner of Mexican movies, and in 2021 has sued Google and YouTube for playing his movies without permission.

== Filmography ==
=== Actor ===
- Los guardiamarinas (1967)
- Aquí mando yo (1967)
- ¿Es usted el asesino? (1967)
- Juicio de faldas (1969)
- Golpe de mano (Explosión) (1970)
- El diablo Cojuelo (1971)
- Tirarse al monte (1971)
- La cera virgen (1972)
- Minutos después (1976)

=== Writer ===
- Manaos (1979)
- La conquista de la tierra perdida (Conquest) (1983)
- Goma-2 (1984)
- Escuadrón: Counterforce (1988)
- A puño limpio (1989)
- Leyendas del Exilio (2017)

=== Director ===
- El día de los asesinos (1979)
- El día del compadre (1983)
- Gregorio Walerstein: El zar (2009)
