= KYAZ =

Television station in Katy, Texas

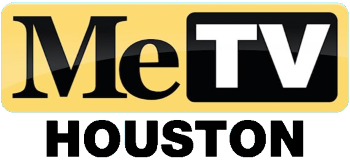
- Katy–Houston, Texas; United States
- City: Katy, Texas
- Channels: Digital: 25 (UHF); Virtual: 51
- Branding: MeTV Houston

Programming
- Affiliations: 51.1: MeTV; for others, see § Subchannels

Ownership
- Owner: Weigel Broadcasting; (KYAZ-TV LLC)

History
- First air date: November 3, 1993
- Former call signs: KNWS-TV (1993–2010)
- Former channel numbers: Analog: 51 (UHF, 1993–2009); Digital: 52 (UHF, 2002–2009), 47 (UHF, 2009–2019); Translators: KTJA-LP 51 Victoria; KYAZ-LP 41 Midland–Odessa
- Former affiliations: Independent (1993–2010); Azteca América (2010–2021)

Technical information
- Licensing authority: FCC
- Facility ID: 31870
- ERP: 1,000 kW
- HAAT: 595 m (1,952 ft)
- Transmitter coordinates: 29°33′45.2″N 95°30′35.9″W

Links
- Public license information: Public file; LMS
- Website: metv.com/kyaz

KYAZ (channel 51) is a television station licensed to Katy, Texas, United States, serving as the Houston area outlet for the classic television network MeTV. Owned by Weigel Broadcasting, the station maintains studios at One Arena Place on Bissonnet Street on Houston's southwest side, and its transmitter is located near Missouri City, Texas.

== History ==
=== Early history ===
The station first signed on the air on November 3, 1993, as KNWS-TV, a 24-hour all-news station that was owned by Douglas R. Johnson through his Johnson Broadcasting company. The all-news format featured special segments, and pre-recorded newscasts that were looped, then updated, throughout the day. During 1995, KNWS simulcast live coverage of the O. J. Simpson murder trial from KTLA in Los Angeles.

KNWS began cutting back on its news programming in November 1996; following a canceled sale to home shopping operator Global Broadcasting Systems in 1997, the station abandoned its all-news format entirely on January 1, 1998, and became a traditional independent station, broadcasting syndicated classic television series and movies, as well as Houston Astros baseball games (many of the games were also simulcast on sister station KLDT in Lake Dallas, Texas). It also maintained local news updates, using the remains of the station's old newsroom. During this time, the station adopted the slogan "TV 51 Has The Shows You Know". By 2000, however, some of the programming had been dropped in favor of infomercials, a trend that would continue over the next decade. The Astros remained on KNWS until 2008, when the team's game telecasts moved to KTXH (channel 20).

Some NBC shows that KPRC-TV (channel 2) declined to air also aired on KNWS. Two such NBC programs were the daytime talk show Leeza, which briefly aired on KNWS in 1998, and the soap opera Passions, which also briefly aired on the station in 2001. In 1996, KNWS carried NBC Sports coverage of Notre Dame football home games as well as the Breeders' Cup. In 2000, KNWS carried Game 6 of the American League Championship Series (coincidentally, the last MLB game aired by NBC to date).

During the non-stop coverage of 2005's Hurricane Rita on Houston's news-producing stations, KNWS carried CBS network programs, on behalf of its local affiliate, KHOU (channel 11), which preempted them in order to run special coverage of the storm. KNWS repeated this pattern during Hurricane Ike.

=== Sale to Una Vez Más ===
Johnson Broadcasting filed for bankruptcy protection in October 2008. One year later, impatient creditors asked the bankruptcy court to allow the sale of KNWS and KLDT. Una Vez Más Holdings, LLC emerged as the leading bidder. The sale to Una Vez Más was approved by the bankruptcy court on December 29, 2009, and finally received FCC approval on September 27, 2010, after the Commission rejected a petition to deny the sale made by Spanish Broadcasting System. The new owners reserved the KAZH call letters, but changed them instead to KYAZ.

Prior to the sale to Una Vez Más, KNWS had made plans to add the Retro Television Network on a digital subchannel, but due to the bankruptcy filing, that plan was scrapped. Instead, reflecting the pending sale to Una Vez Más, an Azteca América subchannel was added to the station's digital signal as channel 51.2 on April 25, 2010. RTV ended up on KUVM-CD, a Mako Communications station, and the previous affiliate of Azteca América in Houston.

KYAZ began simulcasting Azteca América on subchannels 51.1 and 51.2 on December 29, 2010, the same day its new call letters were approved. Cold Case Files was acquired by KUBE-TV (channel 57), and weekly episodes of Cheaters moved to KIAH (channel 39). The weekly Heart of the Nation Catholic Mass also moved to KUBE-TV. It is unknown if more of channel 51's former meager programming inventory relocated to other stations.

In 2014, Una Vez Mas' TV assets (including KYAZ) were then sold to Northstar Media, LLC. In turn, HC2 Holdings acquired Northstar Media in addition to Azteca América on November 29, 2017, making KYAZ an Azteca owned-and-operated station.

=== Sale to Weigel Broadcasting ===
On September 14, 2020, Weigel Broadcasting announced that it would buy three of HC2's TV properties (including KYAZ and its longtime Dallas sister KAZD) as well as a low-powered station. The sale was consummated on December 29, making this the fourth ownership change in 11 years. KYAZ and KAZD became MeTV owned-and-operated stations on March 29, 2021.

== Technical information ==
=== Subchannels ===
The station's signal is multiplexed:

Subchannels of KYAZ
Subchannel	Res.	Short name	Programming
51.1	720p	MeTV	MeTV
51.2	480i	MeTV+	MeTV+
51.3	480i	DABL	Dabl
51.4	480i	STORY	Story Television
51.5	480i	WEST	WEST
51.6	480i	TOONS	MeTV Toons
51.12	480i	EMLW	OnTV4U (infomercials)

=== Analog-to-digital conversion ===
KYAZ-TV (as KNWS) ended regular programming on its analog signal, over UHF channel 51, on June 12, 2009, as part of the federally mandated transition from analog to digital television. The station's digital signal relocated from its pre-transition UHF channel 52, which was among the high band UHF channels (52-69) that were removed from broadcasting use as a result of the transition, to UHF channel 47, using virtual channel 51.

== See also ==
- KAZD (Lake Dallas, Texas)
