= KUVM-CD =

Television station in Missouri City, Texas

- Missouri City–Houston, Texas; United States
- City: Missouri City, Texas
- Channels: Digital: 20 (UHF); Virtual: 34

Programming
- Affiliations: see § Subchannels

Ownership
- Owner: Innovate Corp.; (HC2 LPTV Holdings, Inc.)
- Sister stations: KEHO-LD, KUGB-CD, KUVM-LD, KBMN-LD

History
- Founded: August 6, 1980
- First air date: November 30, 1981
- Former call signs: K55CP (1981–1989); K53CZ (1989–2000); KVIT-LP (2000–2007); KUVM-CA (2007–2010)
- Former channel numbers: Analog: 55 (UHF, 1981–1989), 53 (UHF, 1989−2000), 28 (UHF, 2000–2003), 34 (UHF, 2003–2009); Digital: 34 (UHF, 2010–2019)
- Former affiliations: Independent (1980−?); HSN (c. 2004−c. 2006); Azteca América (2007−2010); Telestai (October−November 2010); MundoFox/MundoMax (2013−2016); LATV (2017−2026)
- Call sign meaning: Former owner Una Vez Más

Technical information
- Licensing authority: FCC
- Facility ID: 13200
- Class: CD
- ERP: 15 kW
- HAAT: 296.1 m (971 ft)
- Transmitter coordinates: 29°33′45.2″N 95°30′35.9″W

Links
- Public license information: Public file; LMS

KUVM-CD (channel 34) is a low-power, Class A television station licensed to Missouri City, Texas, United States, serving the Houston area. Owned by Innovate Corp., the station maintains affiliations with several digital multicast networks. KUVM-CD's transmitter is located near Missouri City, in unincorporated northeastern Fort Bend County.

== History ==
Former logo

Logo as MundoFox

The station began as a construction permit in Victoria, Texas, granted to Community Television of Victoria. Planned as a translator of San Antonio television station KWEX-TV, to broadcast on UHF channel 25, the new station was almost immediately displaced by new full-service station KAVU-TV. It was instead built on UHF channel 55 and was licensed as K55CP on November 30, 1981. By 1982, it was on the air with programs from the Satellite Program Network. Community Television sold the station to Number 1 TV, Inc. on April 13, 1983, but re-acquired the station from bankruptcy in 1985. In December 1981, the station had applied to move to channel 53; the FCC granted the permit on June 30, 1988, and the station was licensed as K53CZ on channel 53 on December 29, 1989, though it remained on channel 55 well into the 1990s. The station moved to channel 28 in 2000 and adopted new calls KVIT-LP.

In the mid-2000s, the station was relocated to DeWalt, a suburb of Houston. During this time, at least c. 2006, the station showed programming from the Home Shopping Network. In 2003, the station moved to channel 34.

The station's call sign was changed to KUVM-CA on May 16, 2007. On July 1, KUVM-CA began airing Azteca América when KUBE-TV (channel 57) stopped carrying it.

KUVM-CA ceased its analog signal on October 22, 2009. (Due to its low-power status, it was not required to end analog broadcasting when full-power analog broadcasting ended on June 12). Azteca América programming shifted to K10PY-D (channel 10, now KUVM-LD).

A minor change in call sign to KUVM-CD was granted on April 26, 2010.

On July 1, 2010, the FCC consented to the sale of the station to Mako Communications.

KUVM-CD returned to the air from the Missouri City tower farm in July 2010. RTV was added to 34.2 on August 26, 2010, and the Mexican Telestai network was added to 34.1 on October 12, 2010, apparently running from an Internet stream. That feed proved unstable, and Telestai was dropped in November 2010. AMGTV also aired on a subchannel from April 2011 to April 2012.

In June 2013, KUVM-CD was slated to be sold to Landover 5 LLC as part of a larger deal involving 51 other low-power television stations; the sale fell through in June 2016.

On November 30, 2016, MundoMax ceased operations, leaving KUVM-CD without any programming briefly until the beginning of 2017 when they affiliated with LATV.

Mako Communications sold its stations, including KUVM-CD, to HC2 Holdings in 2017.

== Subchannels ==
The station's signal is multiplexed:

Subchannels of KUVM-CD
Subchannel	Res.	Short name	Programming
34.1	480i	KUVM-CD	QVC 365
34.2	480i	KUVM-CD	Infomercials (4:3)
34.3	480i	KUVM-CD	Infomercials (4:3)
34.4	480i	KUVM-CD	Defy
34.5	480i	KUVM-CD	365BLK
34.6	480i	KUVM-CD	Outlaw
34.7	480i	KUVM-CD	Salem News Channel
