= TuVisión =

Defunct American television network

- Type: Broadcast television network
- Country: United States
- Availability: Defunct
- Owner: Pappas Telecasting
- Launch date: July 1, 2007
- Dissolved: March 2009
- Former names: None
- Official website: TuVision.com

TuVisión was an American Spanish language broadcasting network, which was owned by Pappas Telecasting. TuVisión is a portmanteau of tu (your) and televisión. During the latter part of 2007, Pappas hired Moelis & Company to develop long-term objectives to identify which television assets it should retain. In 2008, several affiliates filed for Chapter 11 protection. and TuVisión ceased broadcasting in 2009.

== History ==
TuVisión began operations on July 1, 2007, after Pappas dropped the Azteca America network from five of the six Spanish-language stations that Pappas owned (KAZH, KTNC, KAZR, KAZO and KAZJ). The only exception was Los Angeles' KAZA-TV, which retained the network until its 2018 sale to Weigel Broadcasting; Pappas was under contract to carry Azteca América through December 2012 and its later bankruptcy effectively kept the affiliation after 2012 on creditor's orders.

In September 2007, Fernando Acosta became the network's vice-president. For 2008, the network planned to expand its coverage to thirteen further stations, while, its programming, such as Paparazzi TV and Alma Gemela had attracted good ratings by November 2007 in some markets.

== Programs ==
The main programs of TuVisión were Dueña y Señora (Puerto Rican telenovela), Alma Gemela (Brazilian telenovela), The Johnny Canales Show (music), Marta Susana (Guatemalan show) and Paparazzi TV (produced by Mega TV).
