= Azteca América =

Former American Spanish-language free-to-air television network

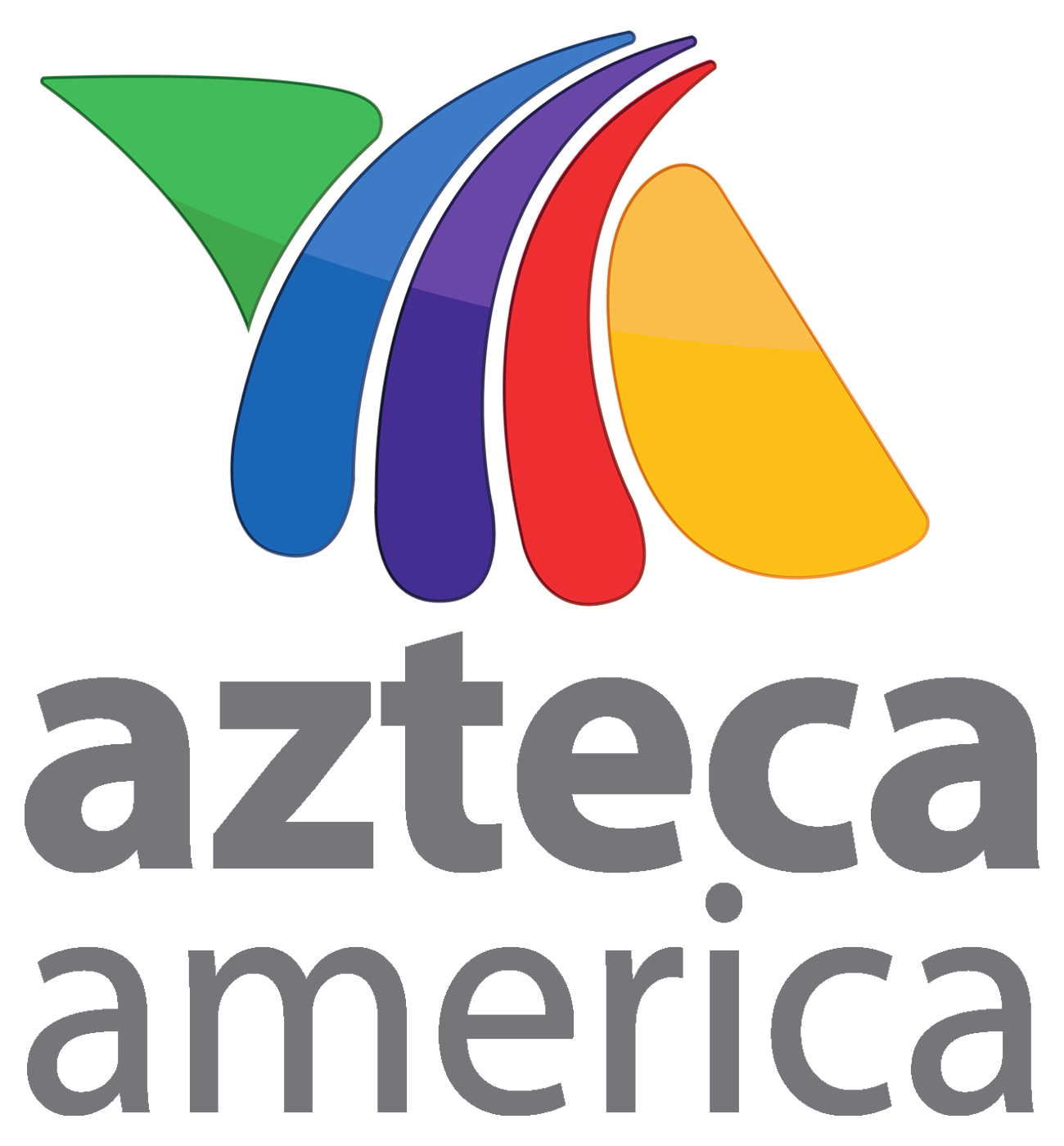
- Type: Former Spanish language free-to-air television network
- Country: United States
- Broadcast area: United States; (coverage: 41%); Northern Mexico; (via U.S.-based free-to-air affiliates and select pay-TV providers)
- Affiliates: List of affiliates

Programming
- Language: Spanish
- Picture format: 1080i (HDTV); 480i (SDTV) (formatted to downconverted widescreen in many markets)

Ownership
- Owner: TV Azteca (2001-2017); INNOVATE Corp. (2017-2023; Azteca name & branding licensed from TV Azteca)

History
- Founded: September 8, 2000
- Launched: July 28, 2001; 25 years ago
- Founder: Ricardo Salinas Pliego
- Closed: December 31, 2022; 3 years ago
- Former names: Azteca (2014–2015)

Azteca América (Spanish pronunciation: [asˈteka], sometimes shortened to Azteca) was an American Spanish-language free-to-air television network owned by INNOVATE Corp., which acquired the network from the Azteca International Corporation subsidiary of TV Azteca.

Headquartered in New York City, the network's programming was aimed at the Hispanic and Latin American communities in the United States. It also had access to programming from TV Azteca's three television national networks in Mexico, including a library with over 200,000 hours of original programming and news content from local bureaus in 32 Mexican states. Its programming consisted of a mix of telenovelas, drama series, news programming, and reality and variety series.

Azteca was available on pay television (primarily carried on dedicated Spanish language programming tiers, except in some markets with a free-the-air affiliate), with local stations in over 60 markets with large Hispanic and Latin American populations (reaching 89% of the Hispanic population in the U.S. The network's former flagship station KAZA-TV in Los Angeles (until January 2018) was the highest-rated station in Azteca's portfolio.

Azteca América ceased all operations on December 31, 2022.

== History ==
The network was formed through a programming alliance between Mexico-based broadcaster TV Azteca and Visalia, California-based television station owner Pappas Telecasting Companies announced on September 8, 2000; the two companies planned to launch a new Spanish language broadcast network during the second quarter of 2001, that would act as a competitor to established networks Univision and Telemundo. TV Azteca, which planned to own 20% of the network, contributed an exclusive programming agreement in the United States and Canada, while Pappas, which owned a majority 80% interest, planned to have stations it owned in ten markets – three already owned by the network, and seven that Pappas was in the process of acquiring in Nevada, Arizona and Texas (most of which were low-power stations) – serve as charter stations of the network, which was originally named Azteca América. Pappas and Azteca invested close to $500 million to start up the network, with an additional $450 million allocated for station acquisitions and a $129 million loan made by TV Azteca to Pappas. The network hoped to reach 65% to 70% of the Hispanic population in the U.S. by 2002.

TV Azteca, which was formed in 1993, launched the network to capitalize on its success with its two television stations in Mexico City – XHDF-TV (channel 13) and XHIMT-TV (channel 7), respectively branded as "Azteca Trece" and "Azteca Siete" – which maintained a lineup of programs, including telenovelas and other serialized dramas with socially relevant themes, that helped it quickly grow to maintain a 36% ratings share during prime time against competition from the longer established and dominant Televisa networks. Azteca founder Ricardo Salinas Pliego had made previous attempts at entering into U.S. television during the late 1990s; it made a failed attempt to acquire an equity interest in Telemundo in 1998, but eventually agreed to a short-lived co-production and program distribution agreement with the network. In 1999, the network also tried to negotiate a joint venture with the upstart Hispanic Television Network; CEO Marco Camacho had also rejected an exclusive content agreement between HTVN and Azteca due to questions over the appeal of the latter's programming to Latino Americans, although a spokesman for TV Azteca stated that the network pulled out due to a lack of confidence in HTVN's overall national distribution.

On December 21, 2000, the Pappas-Azteca joint venture received approval from the Federal Communications Commission (FCC) to launch a full-power television station in Los Angeles, California (where it would base its headquarters), KIDN-TV (channel 54) – which was later reassigned the call letters KAZA-TV prior to its launch. The network, through both companies, planned to acquire stations in twelve markets to serve as Azteca América's charter stations. The plans for the network were eventually scaled down, as a slowdown of the world economy hurt Azteca América's plans to secure financing to purchase stations in Dallas (where Pappas-Azteca attempted to acquire independent station KXTX, which was bought by Telemundo instead for $65 million) and El Paso, Texas. Also playing a factor was the December 2000 purchase of USA Broadcasting's thirteen major-market television stations by Univision Communications, which prevented the network from initially obtaining charter stations in major markets such as New York City and Miami; the Pappas-Azteca venture also called off a $37.5 million deal to purchase WSAH (now WZME) in Bridgeport, Connecticut from Shop at Home, Inc. (which would have given Azteca América a station in the New York City market) in November 2000.

KAZA-TV signed on the air as Azteca América's lone station on July 28, 2001, as part of a phased rollout cited by lower viewership during the summer months; Pappas also announced that it would switch some of its existing stations to Azteca América and attempt to purchase additional stations with the intent of affiliating them with the network. In October 2001, TV Azteca announced that it would scrap plans to buy additional stations and instead distribute Azteca América's programming through agreements struck through prospective affiliates, with Pappas and TV Azteca sharing 50% ownership of the network.

Pappas Telecasting Companies gave up its majority stake in Azteca America in early 2002. The network eventually grew to nine affiliates by that September, reaching 28% of the Hispanic market, with stations added in markets such as Reno, Nevada; Salt Lake City, Utah; San Francisco; and Sacramento, California. The network eventually gained an affiliate in the lucrative Miami market in November 2002, when it affiliated with WPMF-LP (channel 31); this was followed later that year by WNYN-LP in New York City.

By the next year, Azteca América was reaching 52% of the U.S. Hispanic population. In 2003, the network covered 69% of the Hispanic audience; that number increased to 77% by 2004. In the summer of 2006, the network relocated its corporate headquarters to the Los Angeles suburb of Glendale, California.

Also in April 2007, Pappas Telecasting Companies announced that it would discontinue its relationship with Azteca América, and disaffiliate the network from stations it owned in several markets (such as Houston and San Francisco). Pappas attempted to launch a new network from those stations, TuVisión, made up of mainly acquired programming, to little success. In May 2008, Azteca América announced that it would layoff about 30 employees in a cost-cutting measure amid a weak advertising market due to the 2008 financial crisis.

An odd decision made by Azteca at this time was the launch of a DirecTV-exclusive companion channel known as Azteca México, which aired on channel 442 next to Azteca América's channel 441 and carried a schedule of programming from Azteca 7, Azteca Trece and adn40 combined into one schedule and often aired live with their Mexican sister channels, and in competition with Azteca América at times. It was discontinued in October 2016 with Estrella TV assuming the channel 442 slot.

At the network's upfront presentation in New York City on May 13, 2014, the network announced that it would be changing its name to simply Azteca, citing that the change "reflects the network's core audience, an audience composed of the market segment that makes up the largest portion of the U.S. Hispanic market." The network phased in the revised branding on-air later that month. Azteca has been inching up in market share against its larger competitors thanks to strategic changes spearheaded by president-CEO Manuel Abud, who was president of Telemundo's station group before joining Azteca in 2014.

Azteca lost several affiliates as part of the launch of Fox Networks Group/RCN Televisión's joint effort network MundoFox in fall 2013; however it gained several back and never lost much ratings ground by the time MundoMax ended operations in December 2016, a year after Fox backed out of the joint venture.

On November 29, 2017, it was announced that TV Azteca sold its American counterpart to HC2 Holdings in New York City. The transaction closed that same day. Azteca still retained some rights on part of its programming inventory, marketing, advertising sales, assets finance and operations. The transaction also included a seven-year programming and services agreement that allowed HC2 Network to have access, under certain rules, to TV Azteca's library and programming in Mexico, including top entertainment shows, talk shows, reality programs, network and local news, as well as telenovelas and other scripted series. HC2, now known as INNOVATE Corp., also licensed the Azteca America brand and its logo.

On October 21, 2022, INNOVATE Corp. announced that Azteca América would cease operations on December 31, after 22 years of operation as a competitor to leading Spanish networks Univision and Telemundo. Prior to the announcement, INNOVATE had been selling most of the full-power stations operated by Azteca América, and began notifying affiliates and advertising partners of the network's planned closure. In addition, TV Azteca had entered into a content and co-production agreement with American network Estrella TV that will see its news and entertainment programming blended onto that network's schedule. The network went off the air on January 1, 2023, at around 12:59 a.m., after an airing of Ya Cayó Renovado and their ‘todo somos uno’ bumper. Azteca América's website was redirected to TV Azteca's website shortly thereafter.

== Programming ==
Azteca América formerly operated on a 150-hour network programming schedule. It provided various types of general entertainment programming to owned-and-operated and affiliated stations Monday through Fridays from 3:00 a.m. to 12:00 a.m., and Saturdays and Sundays from 5:00 a.m. to 12:00 a.m. Eastern and Pacific Time. All other time periods were filled with infomercials. Affiliates were allowed the option to carried local programming – including local public affairs programs, local brokered programming and, less commonly, newscasts – in place of regular programming or infomercials aired within the base Azteca schedule. In the network's latter years, though its affiliate base was mainly made up of automated HC2/Innovate stations which with the repeal of the Main Studio Rule in 2019, terminated all local operations and outreach to their viewers.

The network's programming included coverage of Liga MX teams held by the main Azteca network, family game shows, lifestyle, reality and drama series, telenovelas and news programming. Regular series airing on the network included the "caught-on-tape"-focused newsmagazine Al Extremo ("To The Extreme"), and the 7pm family hour, La Hora Ganadora ("The Winning Hour"). Azteca also aired a five-hour block of Spanish-dubbed American programs aimed at children in a split-schedule format each Saturday and Sunday morning (with the first two hours airing Saturdays and the final three on Sundays), designed to meet the Federal Communications Commission's educational and informational programming requirements.

The U.S.-based Azteca network featured content sourced from TV Azteca's four television networks in Mexico – Azteca Uno, Azteca 7, ADN 40 and a+.

In addition, Azteca complemented its Mexican-originated programming with a lineup of programs from international producers and distributors such as GestMusic Endemol, Colombia's Caracol TV, and Spain's Islas Audiovisual.

=== News programming ===
Azteca maintained a news division and produced two half-hour newscasts that aired on Monday through Friday evenings, the early evening Hechos Nacional Tarde and the late evening Hechos Nacional Noche, both anchored by Roberto Ruiz. Both newscasts, produced from Mexico, aired exclusively in the United States and focus on the national and international news and events that affect U.S. Hispanics. Azteca also broadcast a three-hour morning news program Hechos AM on weekdays as well as the weeknight sports highlight and discussion program Deporte Caliente ("Hot Sports").

The network formed its news division in 2003, with the debut of the national evening news program Hechos América. In May 2008, the network relocated production of its national newscasts as well as the local newscasts aired by its Los Angeles flagship station KAZA-TV from the network's Glendale headquarters to Mexico City due to the budget cuts enacted that month, resulting in the layoffs of 19 employees within its news division; the network retained reporters, producers and assignment editors that were based in Los Angeles and correspondents based in New York City, Chicago, Houston, Dallas and Washington, D.C. On February 6, 2009, Azteca announced that it would cancel its newscasts and announced plans to launch a bi-national newscast produced out of TV Azteca's Mexico City station XHIMT-TV.

=== Sports programming ===
The network also maintained a sports division, Azteca Deportes, which is separate from the division operated by its Mexico-based sister network and was responsible for the production of sports content on Azteca. The division produced association football matches from Liga MX, which typically aired under the brand "Fut Azteca." In 2013, the network began airing a prime time match-of-the-week involving teams within Liga MX on Friday nights under the brand "Viernes Futbolero" ("Friday Night Futbol"). In July 2016 Univision started their own block of Liga MX matches on Saturday nights using the "Futbolero" name called "Sábado Futbolero" ("Saturday Night Futbol"). Rather than a league media rights deal encompassing all teams, Liga MX allows its member clubs to negotiate its home broadcast contracts individually with a network in both Mexico and the United States, thus why Azteca América held individual team rights.

The network stopped airing Liga MX matches after the Clausura 2017 season after the network sold their home match rights for Atlas, Morelia, Tijuana and Veracruz to Univision.

In addition, Azteca broadcast a weekly lucha libre showcase on Saturday afternoons, Lucha Azteca, and Box Azteca, a weekly prime time boxing series that aired on most Saturday nights.

At the end of the 2018–19 season, Azteca started airing two select La Liga Segunda División matches per weekend as part of an agreement with beIN Sports who sub-licensed the rights.

== Stations ==
Azteca's network was formerly made up of 64 stations, 27 of which were operated by Azteca America. In many areas of the U.S. where the network was not available through broadcast television, Azteca provided a national cable network feed that is distributed directly to cable, satellite and IPTV providers as an alternative method of distribution in markets without either the availability or the demand for a locally based owned-and-operated or affiliate station.

== Related services ==
=== Azteca HD ===
Azteca's master feed was transmitted in 1080i high definition. However, only seven of the network's affiliate stations transmitted the network's programming in HD, all but two of which carried the network feed in 720p high definition; the remainder of its over-the-air stations transmitted Azteca programming in 480i standard definition either due to technical considerations for affiliates of other major networks that carry Azteca programming on a digital subchannel or because a primary feed Azteca affiliate has not yet modified or upgraded their transmission equipment to allow content to be presented in HD.

Azteca América became the third major Spanish-language network in the United States (after Telemundo and Univision) to provide its programming in high definition through the network and select local stations with the launch of its simulcast feed, Azteca América HD, on July 16, 2012. All of the network's first-run entertainment, news and sports programming, as well as specials and select acquired programs, were presented in HD since then (with the current exception of archived programs that were made prior to 2012 – including comedy series such as Te Caché ("I Got You") and Ya Cayó Renovado ("It Fell Renovated"), and select children's programs – and were originally produced in 4:3 standard definition, as well as most older Mexican-produced feature films). The high-definition feed was available in certain markets via the network's national cable feed, as well as through a few of Azteca's over-the-air affiliates.

== See also ==
- Grupo Salinas
- List of Spanish-language television networks in the United States

== Bibliography ==
- J. Pinon (2011). "Unexplored Challenges of Television Distribution: the Case of Azteca America". Television & New Media. 12: 66–90. doi:10.1177/1527476410365706. S2CID 143916898.
