= Channel 27 digital TV stations in the United States =

The following television stations broadcast on digital channel 27 in the United States:

- K27AE-D in Victorville, etc., California, on virtual channel 27
- K27AI-D in Ninilchik, etc., Alaska
- K27CD-D in Boulder, Montana
- K27CL-D in Coos Bay/North Bend, Oregon
- K27CS-D in Montpelier, Idaho
- K27DA-D in Big Sandy Valley, Arizona
- K27DO-D in Bend, etc., Oregon
- K27DX-D in McCall, Idaho
- K27EJ-D in Colorado City, Arizona
- K27FI-D in Frost, Minnesota
- K27GB-D in Beryl/Modena/New Castle, Utah
- K27GC-D in Heber/Midway, Utah, on virtual channel 5, which rebroadcasts KSL-TV
- K27GD-D in Park City, Utah, on virtual channel 5, which rebroadcasts KSL-TV
- K27GL-D in Hobbs, New Mexico
- K27GM-D in Preston, Idaho, on virtual channel 10, which rebroadcasts KISU-TV
- K27HJ-D in Pierre, South Dakota
- K27HM-D in Quanah, Texas
- K27HP-D in Alamogordo, New Mexico
- K27HR-D in Manti & Ephraim, Utah, on virtual channel 9, which rebroadcasts KUEN
- K27IG-D in Cortez, etc., Colorado
- K27IH-D in Holyoke, Colorado, on virtual channel 51, which rebroadcasts K16NJ-D
- K27IM-D in Billings, Montana
- K27IS-D in Emery, Utah
- K27JK-D in Glendale, Nevada
- K27JO-D in Strong City, Oklahoma
- K27JP-D in Little Rock, Arkansas
- K27JQ-D in Wolf Point, Montana
- K27JT-D in Fillmore, etc., Utah
- K27JV-D in Kanab, Utah, on virtual channel 5, which rebroadcasts KSL-TV
- K27JW-D in Joplin, Montana
- K27JY-D in London Springs, Oregon
- K27JZ-D in Round Mountain, Nevada
- K27KA-D in Parlin, Colorado, on virtual channel 7, which rebroadcasts K11AT-D
- K27KC-D in Ferron, Utah
- K27KE-D in Huntington, Utah
- K27KH-D in Orderville, Utah
- K27KN-D in Alexandria, Minnesota, on virtual channel 10, which rebroadcasts KWCM-TV
- K27KP-D in Driggs, Idaho
- K27KR-D in Fishlake Resort, Utah
- K27KS-D in Globe/Miami, Arizona
- K27KV-D in Evanston, Wyoming
- K27KW-D in Gold Hill, etc., Oregon
- K27KX-D in Las Animas, Colorado
- K27LD-D in Salix, Iowa
- K27LK-D in Gateview, Colorado, on virtual channel 7, which rebroadcasts K25PT-D
- K27LL-D in Big Falls, Minnesota
- K27LO-D in Emigrant, Montana
- K27LT-D in Baker, Montana
- K27MF-D in Orovada, Nevada
- K27MM-D in Tendoy/Leadore, Idaho
- K27MQ-D in St. George, Utah, on virtual channel 8, which rebroadcasts KCSG
- K27MT-D in Romeo, Colorado
- K27MV-D in Durant, Oklahoma
- K27MW-D in Soda Springs, Idaho
- K27MX-D in Baker Valley, Oregon
- K27MY-D in Altus, Oklahoma
- K27NA-D in Shreveport, Louisiana
- K27NB-D in Baton Rouge, Louisiana
- K27NC-D in Coeur D'Alene, Idaho
- K27ND-D in Aztec, New Mexico
- K27NE-D in Susanville, etc., California
- K27NF-D in Jackson, Minnesota
- K27NG-D in Fountain Green, Utah
- K27NH-D in Morgan, etc., Utah, on virtual channel 7, which rebroadcasts KUED
- K27NI-D in Neligh, Nebraska
- K27NJ-D in Rural Beaver, etc., Utah
- K27NK-D in Parowan, Enoch, etc., Utah
- K27NL-D in Clovis, New Mexico
- K27NM-D in Delta, etc., Utah
- K27NN-D in Eureka, Nevada
- K27NO-D in Vernal, Utah, on virtual channel 14, which rebroadcasts KJZZ-TV
- K27NP-D in Duchesne, Utah, on virtual channel 30, which rebroadcasts KUCW
- K27NQ-D in Helper, Utah
- K27NR-D in Topock, Arizona
- K27NT-D in Golden Valley, Arizona
- K27NU-D in Green River, Utah
- K27NV-D in Scofield, Utah
- K27NW-D in East Price, Utah, on virtual channel 30, which rebroadcasts KUCW
- K27NX-D in Ridgecrest, California, on virtual channel 5, which rebroadcasts KTLA
- K27NY-D in Clear Creek, Utah
- K27NZ-D in Longview, Washington, on virtual channel 12, which rebroadcasts KPTV and on virtual channel 49, which rebroadcasts KPDX
- K27OD-D in Verdi/Mogul, Nevada
- K27OF-D in Crested Butte, Colorado
- K27OG-D in Clarendon, Texas
- K27OH-D in Lund & Preston, Nevada
- K27OI-D in Mina/Luning, Nevada
- K27OJ-D in El Paso, Texas
- K27OM-D in Valmy, Nevada
- K27ON-D in Lucerne Valley, California, on virtual channel 27
- K27OO-D in Ellensburg, Washington
- K27OP-D in Oro Valley/Tucson, Arizona
- K27OR-D in Klagetoh, Arizona
- K27OU-D in Lovell, Wyoming
- K27OV-D in Woody Creek, Colorado
- K27OW-D in Rochester, Minnesota
- K27OY-D in Memphis, Tennessee
- K27PC-D in Yuma, Arizona
- K27PE-D in Gustine, California
- KAAH-TV in Honolulu, Hawaii
- KAIT in Jonesboro, Arkansas
- KAMC in Lubbock, Texas
- KASA-TV in Santa Fe, New Mexico
- KASW in Phoenix, Arizona, an ATSC 3.0 station, on virtual channel 61
- KAVC-LD in Denver, Colorado, on virtual channel 48
- KBAX-LD in Twin Falls, Idaho
- KBGU-LD in St. Louis, Missouri, on virtual channel 33
- KBKI-LD in Boise, Idaho
- KBPX-LD in Houston, Texas, on virtual channel 46
- KBTC-TV in Tacoma, Washington, on virtual channel 28
- KBTV-CD in Sacramento, California, on virtual channel 8
- KBTV-TV in Port Arthur, Texas
- KBVO in Llano, Texas
- KCOR-CD in San Antonio, Texas
- KCPM in Grand Forks, North Dakota
- KCWS-LD in Sioux Falls, South Dakota
- KCWV in Duluth, Minnesota
- KDFI in Dallas, Texas, on virtual channel 27
- KDJB-LD in Hondo, Texas
- KDKJ-LD in Tyler, Texas
- KEBK-LD in Bakersfield, California
- KEDD-LD in Los Angeles, California
- KETF-CD in Laredo, Texas
- KEYT-TV in Santa Barbara, California
- KFDY-LD in Lincoln, Nebraska
- KFOR-TV in Oklahoma City, Oklahoma
- KFTA-TV in Fort Smith, Arkansas
- KFVT-LD in Wichita, Kansas
- KFXA in Cedar Rapids, Iowa
- KGJT-CD in Grand Junction, Colorado
- KHGI-CD in North Platte, Nebraska
- KKEL in Ely, Nevada
- KLUF-LD in Lufkin, Texas
- KLWY in Cheyenne, Wyoming
- KMBY-LD in Monterey, California
- KNGF in Grand Forks, North Dakota
- KNWS-LD in Brownsville, Texas
- KNXG-LD in College Station, Texas
- KOHA-LD in Omaha, Nebraska
- KOMU-TV in Columbia, Missouri
- KORO in Corpus Christi, Texas
- KPCD-LD in San Fernando, California
- KPJK in San Mateo, California, on virtual channel 60
- KPOM-CD in Ontario, California, on virtual channel 14
- KQHO-LD in Houston, Texas, uses KBPX-LD's spectrum, on virtual channel 27
- KRPV-DT in Roswell, New Mexico
- KRWF in Redwood Falls, Minnesota, on virtual channel 43
- KRZG-CD in McAllen, Texas
- KSCD-LD in Hemet, California
- KSFV-CD in Los Angeles, California, uses KPOM-CD's spectrum, on virtual channel 27
- KSKC-CD in Pablo/Ronan, Montana
- KSLM-LD in Dallas, Oregon, on virtual channel 27
- KSNT in Topeka, Kansas
- KTBV-LD in Los Angeles, California, on virtual channel 12
- KTVE in El Dorado, Arkansas
- KTVW-CD in Flagstaff/Doney Park, Arizona, on virtual channel 6
- KUCO-LD in Chico, California
- KUED in Salt Lake City, Utah, on virtual channel 7
- KUNU-LD in Victoria, Texas
- KVER-CD in Indio, California
- KVEW in Kennewick, Washington
- KVSN-DT in Pueblo, Colorado
- KWBH-LD in Rapid City, South Dakota
- KWYF-LD in Casper, Wyoming
- KXNV-LD in Incline Village, Nevada
- KYPO-LD in Tacna, Arizona
- W27AU-D in Wausau, Wisconsin
- W27DF-D in Quincy, Illinois
- W27DG-D in Millersburg, Ohio, on virtual channel 39, which rebroadcasts WIVM-LD
- W27DK-D in Columbus, Georgia
- W27DP-D in New Bern, North Carolina
- W27DQ-D in Elmhurst, Michigan
- W27DU-D in Traverse City, Michigan
- W27DZ-D in Mayaguez, Puerto Rico, on virtual channel 51, which rebroadcasts WOST
- W27EC-D in Belvidere, New Jersey, on virtual channel 58, which rebroadcasts WNJB
- W27EE-D in Martinsburg, West Virginia
- W27EF-D in Charleston, West Virginia
- W27EH-D in Hattiesburg, Mississippi
- W27EI-D in Moorefield, West Virginia
- W27EJ-D in Sterling, Illinois
- W27EK-D in Boone, North Carolina
- W27EL-D in Champaign, Illinois
- W27EO-D in Panama City, Florida
- W27EP-D in Destin, Florida
- W27EQ-D in Peoria, Illinois
- W27ET-D in Maple Valley, Michigan
- W48CL in Grand Rapids, Michigan
- WADL in Mount Clemens, Michigan, on virtual channel 38
- WAGA-TV in Atlanta, Georgia, on virtual channel 5
- WAIQ in Montgomery, Alabama
- WAPA-TV in San Juan, Puerto Rico, on virtual channel 4
- WBSE-LD in Charleston, South Carolina
- WBUN-LD in Birmingham, Alabama
- WCBI-TV in Columbus, Mississippi
- WDYC-LD in Cincinnati, Ohio
- WFMZ-TV (DRT) in Boyertown, Pennsylvania, on virtual channel 69
- WFNA in Gulf Shores, Alabama, an ATSC 3.0 station
- WGEI-LD in Enterprise, Alabama
- WGTB-CD in Charlotte, North Carolina, on virtual channel 28
- WGZT-LD in Key West, Florida
- WHJC-LP in Williamson, West Virginia
- WHVL-LD in State College, etc., Pennsylvania
- WHWC-TV in Menomonie, Wisconsin, on virtual channel 28
- WILC-CD in Sugar Grove, Illinois
- WIVT in Binghamton, New York
- WJGN-CD in Chesapeake, Virginia
- WKRN-TV in Nashville, Tennessee, on virtual channel 2
- WLJT in Lexington, Tennessee
- WLZE-LD in Fort Myers, Florida
- WMAR-TV in Baltimore, Maryland, on virtual channel 2
- WMJQ-CD in Syracuse, New York
- WNAL-LD in Scottsboro, Alabama
- WNDU-TV in South Bend, Indiana
- WNYW in New York, New York, on virtual channel 5
- WOCD-LD in Ocala, Florida
- WOCV-CD in Cleveland, Ohio
- WPDE-TV in Florence, South Carolina
- WPNM-LD in Liepsic, Ohio
- WPSJ-CD in Hammonton, New Jersey, on virtual channel 8
- WPXR-TV in Roanoke, Virginia
- WQLN in Erie, Pennsylvania
- WRDQ in Orlando, Florida, on virtual channel 27
- WSFL-TV in Miami, Florida, on virtual channel 39
- WSOT-LD in Marion, Indiana, on virtual channel 27
- WTAE-TV in Pittsburgh, Pennsylvania, on virtual channel 4
- WTBT-LD in Tampa, Florida
- WTTE in Columbus, Ohio, on virtual channel 28
- WTTV in Bloomington, Indiana, on virtual channel 4
- WTVQ-DT in Lexington, Kentucky
- WTXL-TV in Tallahassee, Florida
- WUNI in Marlborough, Massachusetts, on virtual channel 66
- WUNP-TV in Roanoke Rapids, North Carolina, on virtual channel 36
- WUNW in Canton, North Carolina
- WVTV in Milwaukee, Wisconsin, on virtual channel 18
- WWAX-LD in Hartford, Connecticut
- WWJE-DT in Derry, New Hampshire, uses WUNI'S spectrum, on virtual channel 50
- WWL-TV in New Orleans, Louisiana
- WWRJ-LD in Jacksonville, Florida
- WXSG-LD in Springfield, Illinois
- WYJH-LD in White Lake, New York, on virtual channel 51, which rebroadcasts WYNB-LD
- WYME-CD in Gainesville, Florida

The following stations, which are no longer licensed, formerly broadcast on digital channel 27:

- K27BZ-D in Wellington, Texas
- K27EC-D in Lake Havasu City, Arizona
- K27EE-D in Ukiah, California
- K27JJ-D in Forbes/Jasper Cty, Texas
- K27MG-D in Columbia, Missouri
- KHGI-LD in O'Neil, Nebraska
- KNYS-LD in Natchitoches, Louisiana
- KULG-LD in Springfield, Missouri
- KYAM-LD in Hereford, Texas
- W27DH-D in Evansville, Indiana
- W27DV-D in Bluffton–Hilton Head, Georgia
- WBKH-LD in Port Charlotte, Florida
- WPCP-CD in New Castle, Pennsylvania
- WUDI-LD in Myrtle Beach, South Carolina
