= Channel 27 low-power TV stations in the United States =

The following low-power television stations broadcast on digital or analog channel 27 in the United States:

- K27AE-D in Victorville, etc., California
- K27AI-D in Ninilchik, etc., Alaska
- K27CD-D in Boulder, Montana
- K27CL-D in Coos Bay/North Bend, Oregon
- K27CS-D in Montpelier, Idaho
- K27DA-D in Big Sandy Valley, Arizona
- K27DO-D in Bend, etc., Oregon
- K27DX-D in McCall, Idaho
- K27EJ-D in Colorado City, Arizona
- K27FI-D in Frost, Minnesota
- K27GB-D in Beryl/Modena/New Castle, Utah
- K27GC-D in Heber/Midway, Utah
- K27GD-D in Park City, Utah
- K27GL-D in Hobbs, New Mexico
- K27GM-D in Preston, Idaho
- K27HJ-D in Pierre, South Dakota
- K27HM-D in Quanah, Texas
- K27HP-D in Alamogordo, New Mexico
- K27HR-D in Manti & Ephraim, Utah
- K27IG-D in Cortez, etc., Colorado
- K27IH-D in Holyoke, Colorado
- K27IM-D in Billings, Montana
- K27IS-D in Emery, Utah
- K27JK-D in Glendale, Nevada
- K27JO-D in Strong City, Oklahoma
- K27JP-D in Little Rock, Arkansas
- K27JQ-D in Wolf Point, Montana
- K27JT-D in Fillmore, etc., Utah
- K27JV-D in Kanab, Utah
- K27JW-D in Joplin, Montana
- K27JY-D in London Springs, Oregon
- K27JZ-D in Round Mountain, Nevada
- K27KA-D in Parlin, Colorado
- K27KC-D in Ferron, Utah
- K27KE-D in Huntington, Utah
- K27KH-D in Orderville, Utah
- K27KN-D in Alexandria, Minnesota
- K27KP-D in Driggs, Idaho
- K27KR-D in Fishlake Resort, Utah
- K27KS-D in Globe/Miami, Arizona
- K27KV-D in Evanston, Wyoming
- K27KW-D in Gold Hill, etc., Oregon
- K27KX-D in Las Animas, Colorado
- K27LD-D in Salix, Iowa
- K27LK-D in Gateview, Colorado
- K27LL-D in Big Falls, Minnesota
- K27LO-D in Emigrant, Montana
- K27LT-D in Baker, Montana
- K27MF-D in Orovada, Nevada
- K27MM-D in Tendoy/Leadore, Idaho
- K27MQ-D in St. George, Utah
- K27MT-D in Romeo, Colorado
- K27MV-D in Durant, Oklahoma
- K27MW-D in Soda Springs, Idaho
- K27MX-D in Baker Valley, Oregon
- K27MY-D in Altus, Oklahoma
- K27NA-D in Shreveport, Louisiana
- K27NB-D in Baton Rouge, Louisiana
- K27NC-D in Coeur D'Alene, Idaho
- K27ND-D in Aztec, New Mexico
- K27NE-D in Susanville, etc., California
- K27NF-D in Jackson, Minnesota
- K27NG-D in Fountain Green, Utah
- K27NH-D in Morgan, etc., Utah
- K27NI-D in Neligh, Nebraska
- K27NJ-D in Rural Beaver, etc., Utah
- K27NK-D in Parowan, Enoch, etc., Utah
- K27NL-D in Clovis, New Mexico
- K27NM-D in Delta, etc., Utah
- K27NN-D in Eureka, Nevada
- K27NO-D in Vernal, Utah
- K27NP-D in Duchesne, Utah
- K27NQ-D in Helper, Utah
- K27NR-D in Topock, Arizona
- K27NT-D in Golden Valley, Arizona
- K27NU-D in Green River, Utah
- K27NV-D in Scofield, Utah
- K27NW-D in East Price, Utah
- K27NX-D in Ridgecrest, California
- K27NY-D in Clear Creek, Utah
- K27NZ-D in Longview, Washington
- K27OD-D in Verdi/Mogul, Nevada
- K27OF-D in Crested Butte, Colorado
- K27OG-D in Clarendon, Texas
- K27OH-D in Lund & Preston, Nevada
- K27OI-D in Mina/Luning, Nevada
- K27OJ-D in El Paso, Texas
- K27OM-D in Valmy, Nevada
- K27ON-D in Lucerne Valley, California
- K27OO-D in Ellensburg, Washington
- K27OP-D in Oro Valley/Tucson, Arizona
- K27OR-D in Klagetoh, Arizona
- K27OU-D in Lovell, Wyoming
- K27OV-D in Woody Creek, Colorado
- K27OW-D in Rochester, Minnesota
- K27OY-D in Memphis, Tennessee
- K27PC-D in Yuma, Arizona
- K27PE-D in Gustine, California
- KAOB-LD in Beaumont, Texas
- KAVC-LD in Denver, Colorado
- KBAX-LD in Twin Falls, Idaho
- KBGU-LD in St. Louis, Missouri
- KBKI-LD in Boise, Idaho
- KBPX-LD in Houston, Texas
- KBTV-CD in Sacramento, California
- KCOR-CD in San Antonio, Texas
- KCWS-LD in Sioux Falls, South Dakota
- KDJB-LD in Hondo, Texas
- KDKJ-LD in Tyler, Texas
- KEBK-LD in Bakersfield, California
- KEDD-LD in Los Angeles, California
- KETF-CD in Laredo, Texas
- KFDY-LD in Lincoln, Nebraska
- KFVT-LD in Wichita, Kansas
- KGJT-CD in Grand Junction, Colorado
- KHGI-CD in North Platte, Nebraska
- KLUF-LD in Lufkin, Texas
- KMBY-LD in Monterey, California
- KNWS-LD in Brownsville, Texas
- KNXG-LD in College Station, Texas
- KOHA-LD in Omaha, Nebraska
- KPCD-LD in San Fernando, California
- KPOM-CD in Ontario, California
- KQHO-LD in Houston, Texas, uses KBPX-LD's spectrum
- KRZG-CD in McAllen, Texas
- KSCD-LD in Hemet, California
- KSFV-CD in Los Angeles, California, uses KPOM-CD's spectrum
- KSKC-CD in Pablo/Ronan, Montana
- KSLM-LD in Dallas, Oregon
- KTBV-LD in Los Angeles, California
- KTVW-CD in Flagstaff/Doney Park, Arizona
- KUCO-LD in Chico, California
- KUNU-LD in Victoria, Texas
- KVER-CD in Indio, California
- KWBH-LD in Rapid City, South Dakota
- KWYF-LD in Casper, Wyoming
- KXNV-LD in Incline Village, Nevada
- KYPO-LD in Tacna, Arizona
- W27AU-D in Wausau, Wisconsin
- W27DF-D in Quincy, Illinois
- W27DG-D in Millersburg, Ohio
- W27DK-D in Columbus, Georgia
- W27DP-D in New Bern, North Carolina
- W27DQ-D in Elmhurst, Michigan
- W27DU-D in Traverse City, Michigan
- W27DZ-D in Mayaguez, Puerto Rico
- W27EC-D in Belvidere, New Jersey
- W27EE-D in Martinsburg, West Virginia
- W27EF-D in Charleston, West Virginia
- W27EH-D in Hattiesburg, Mississippi
- W27EI-D in Moorefield, West Virginia
- W27EJ-D in Sterling, Illinois
- W27EK-D in Boone, North Carolina
- W27EL-D in Champaign, Illinois
- W27EO-D in Panama City, Florida
- W27EP-D in Destin, Florida
- W27EQ-D in Peoria, Illinois
- W27ET-D in Maple Valley, Michigan
- W48CL in Grand Rapids, Michigan
- WBSE-LD in Charleston, South Carolina
- WBUN-LD in Birmingham, Alabama
- WDYC-LD in Cincinnati, Ohio
- WFMZ-TV (DRT) in Boyertown, Pennsylvania
- WGEI-LD in Enterprise, Alabama
- WGTB-CD in Charlotte, North Carolina
- WGZT-LD in Key West, Florida
- WHJC-LP in Williamson, West Virginia
- WHVL-LD in State College, etc., Pennsylvania
- WILC-CD in Sugar Grove, Illinois
- WJGN-CD in Chesapeake, Virginia
- WLZE-LD in Fort Myers, Florida
- WMJQ-CD in Syracuse, New York
- WNAL-LD in Scottsboro, Alabama
- WOCD-LD in Ocala, Florida
- WOCV-CD in Cleveland, Ohio
- WPNM-LD in Liepsic, Ohio
- WPSJ-CD in Hammonton, New Jersey
- WSOT-LD in Marion, Indiana
- WTBT-LD in Tampa, Florida
- WWAX-LD in Hartford, Connecticut
- WWRJ-LD in Jacksonville, Florida
- WXSG-LD in Springfield, Illinois
- WYJH-LD in White Lake, New York
- WYME-CD in Gainesville, Florida

The following low-power stations, which are no longer licensed, formerly broadcast on digital or analog channel 27:

- K27BH in Lake Shastina, California
- K27BZ-D in Wellington, Texas
- K27CB in Fraser, etc., Colorado
- K27DS in Yucca Valley, California
- K27DV in Crowley Lake-Long Va, California
- K27DY in Carlin, Nevada
- K27EC-D in Lake Havasu City, Arizona
- K27EE-D in Ukiah, California
- K27FC in Paragould, Arkansas
- K27GE in Wanship, Utah
- K27GR in Paris, Texas
- K27HU in Price, Utah
- K27HV in Scofield, Utah
- K27JJ-D in Forbes/Jasper Cty, Texas
- K27KM in Wendover, Utah
- K27MG-D in Columbia, Missouri
- KCWK-LP in Yakima, Washington
- KEXT-CD in Modesto, California
- KFRE-CA in Tulare, California
- KHGI-LD in O'Neil, Nebraska
- KIDQ-LP in Lewiston, Idaho
- KNYS-LD in Natchitoches, Louisiana
- KPDN-LP in Monahans, Texas
- KULG-LD in Springfield, Missouri
- KWCE-LP in Alexandria, Louisiana
- KYAM-LD in Hereford, Texas
- KZSW-LP in Hemet, California
- W27BL in Berlin, New Hampshire
- W27DH-D in Evansville, Indiana
- W27DV-D in Bluffton–Hilton Head, Georgia
- WBKH-LD in Port Charlotte, Florida
- WFHD-LP in Ann Arbor, Michigan
- WPCP-CD in New Castle, Pennsylvania
- WUDI-LD in Myrtle Beach, South Carolina
