= Channel 27 virtual TV stations in the United States =

The following television stations operate on virtual channel 27 in the United States:

- K12XK-D in Boulder, Colorado
- K12XQ-D in Monroe, Louisiana
- K14NJ-D in Hot Springs, Montana
- K18GG-D in Mina/Luning, Nevada
- K20JX-D in Sacramento, California
- K25OB-D in San Antonio, Texas
- K26CI-D in Cortez, etc., Colorado
- K26JC-D in Walker Lake, Nevada
- K26JI-D in Sibley, Iowa
- K27AE-D in Victorville, etc., California
- K27DO-D in Bend, etc., Oregon
- K27JP-D in Little Rock, Arkansas
- K27MQ-D in St. George, Utah
- K27OY-D in Memphis, Tennessee
- K27PC-D in Yuma, Arizona
- K27PE-D in Gustine, California
- K32EY-D in Dove Creek, etc., Colorado
- K33GZ-D in Hawthorne, Nevada
- K33PV-D in Rock Rapids, Iowa
- KAOB-LD in Beaumont, Texas
- KBAX-LD in Twin Falls, Idaho
- KBKI-LD in Boise, Idaho
- KCWS-LD in Sioux Falls, South Dakota
- KCWV in Duluth, Minnesota
- KDFI in Dallas, Texas
- KDKJ-LD in Tyler, Texas
- KELV-LD in Las Vegas, Nevada
- KFDY-LD in Lincoln, Nebraska
- KGHB-CD in Pueblo, etc., Colorado
- KGJT-CD in Grand Junction, Colorado
- KHGI-CD in North Platte, Nebraska
- KJKZ-LD in Fresno, California
- KKEL in Ely, Nevada
- KLDO-TV in Laredo, Texas
- KLWY in Cheyenne, Wyoming
- KMBY-LD in Monterey, California
- KNGF in Grand Forks, North Dakota
- KNXG-LD in College Station, Texas
- KOHA-LD in Omaha, Nebraska
- KOZL-TV in Springfield, Missouri
- KPCD-LD in San Fernando, California
- KREN-TV in Reno, Nevada
- KRPV-DT in Roswell, New Mexico
- KSCD-LD in Hemet, California
- KSFV-CD in Los Angeles, California
- KSIN-TV in Sioux City, Iowa
- KSKC-CD in Pablo/Ronan, Montana
- KSLM-LD in Dallas, Oregon
- KSNT in Topeka, Kansas
- KUAS-TV in Tucson, Arizona
- KUCO-LD in Chico, California
- KUKR-LD in Santa Rosa, California
- KWBH-LD in Rapid City, South Dakota
- KWTC-LD in Kerrville, Texas
- KYPO-LD in Tacna, Arizona
- W15DC-D in Florence, South Carolina
- W15ES-D in Myrtle Beach, South Carolina
- W26FE-D in Montgomery, Alabama
- W27AU-D in Wausau, Wisconsin
- W27DK-D in Columbus, Georgia
- W27DP-D in New Bern, North Carolina
- W27DQ-D in Elmhurst, Michigan
- W27EO-D in Panama City, Florida
- W27EP-D in Destin, Florida
- W27EQ-D in Peoria, Illinois
- W27ET-D in Maple Valley, Michigan
- WBGU-TV in Bowling Green, Ohio
- WCCU in Urbana, Illinois
- WCMV in Cadillac, Michigan
- WCQT-LD in Cullman, Alabama
- WFXR in Roanoke, Virginia
- WGEI-LD in Enterprise, Alabama
- WGNT in Portsmouth, Virginia
- WGZT-LD in Key West, Florida
- WHJC-LP in Williamson, West Virginia
- WHTM-TV in Harrisburg, Pennsylvania
- WIRP-LD in Raleigh, North Carolina
- WKBN-TV in Youngstown, Ohio
- WKOW in Madison, Wisconsin
- WKYT-TV in Lexington, Kentucky
- WLNM-LD in Lansing, Michigan
- WLOV-TV in West Point, Mississippi
- WLPB-TV in Baton Rouge, Louisiana
- WNAL-LD in Scottsboro, Alabama
- WNYK-LD in Teaneck, New Jersey
- WOCD-LD in Ocala, Florida
- WQEC in Quincy, Illinois
- WRDQ in Orlando, Florida
- WRJA-TV in Sumter, South Carolina
- WSOT-LD in Marion, Indiana
- WTCT in Marion, Illinois
- WTNB-CD in Cleveland, Tennessee
- WTXL-TV in Tallahassee, Florida
- WUNW in Canton, North Carolina
- WUTF-TV in Worcester, Massachusetts
- WWAX-LD in Hartford, Connecticut
- WWRJ-LD in Jacksonville, Florida
- WXSG-LD in Springfield, Illinois
- WYJJ-LD in Jackson, Tennessee

The following stations, which are no longer licensed, formerly operated on virtual channel 27 in the United States:

- K11XT-D in Mariposa, California
- K20CP-D in Elmo, Montana
- K27EC-D in Lake Havasu City, Arizona
- K27MG-D in Columbia, Missouri
- KCPM in Grand Forks, North Dakota
- KEXT-CD in San Jose, California
- KILW-LD in Rochester, Minnesota
- KNYS-LD in Natchitoches, Louisiana
- KULG-LD in Springfield, Missouri
- W27DH-D in Evansville, Indiana
- W27DV-D in Bluffton–Hilton Head, Georgia
- WDYH-LD in Augusta, Georgia
- WUDI-LD in Myrtle Beach, South Carolina
