= Channel 27 =

Channel 27 refers to several television stations:

== Canada ==
The following television stations operate on virtual channel 27 in Canada:

- CHNB-DT-3 in Moncton, New Brunswick
- CIII-DT-27 in Peterborough, Ontario
- CKVU-DT-2 in Victoria, British Columbia

== Philippines ==
- DWDB-TV, the flagship television station of GTV Channel 27 in Metro Manila, Philippines

== See also ==
- Channel 27 virtual TV stations in the United States

For UHF frequencies covering 548-554 MHz:

- Channel 27 TV stations in Canada
- Channel 27 TV stations in Mexico
- Channel 27 digital TV stations in the United States
- Channel 27 low-power TV stations in the United States
