= Channel 48 =

Channel 48 refers to several television stations:

== Canada ==
The following television stations formerly broadcast on digital channel 48 (UHF frequencies covering 674-680 MHz) in Canada:

- CFMT-DT-1 in London, Ontario
- CJCH-DT in Halifax, Nova Scotia

== See also ==
- Channel 48 TV stations in Mexico
- Channel 48 digital TV stations in the United States
- Channel 48 virtual TV stations in the United States
- Channel 48 low-power TV stations in the United States
