= Channel 48 virtual TV stations in the United States =

The following television stations operate on virtual channel 48 in the United States:

- K11XU-D in El Centro, California
- K19KP-D in Hermiston, Oregon
- K22NI-D in Leesville, Louisiana
- K26NB-D in Klamath Falls, Oregon
- K28NT-D in Bentonville/Rogers, Arkansas
- K28NU-D in Buffalo, Oklahoma
- K30PZ-D in Litchfield, California
- K34NI-D in Florence, Oregon
- K48KJ-D in Geneva, Minnesota
- KAVC-LD in Denver, Colorado
- KDPH-LD in Phoenix, Arizona
- KFBI-LD in Medford, Oregon
- KHHI-LD in Honolulu, Hawaii
- KHVM-LD in Minneapolis, Minnesota
- KKIF-LD in Twin Falls, Idaho
- KLBB-LD in Lubbock, Texas
- KLNK-LD in Groveton, Texas
- KMJF-LD in Columbus, Nebraska
- KNVO in McAllen, Texas
- KOCY-LD in Oklahoma City, Oklahoma
- KPXR-TV in Cedar Rapids, Iowa
- KSTS in San Jose, California
- KTDO in Las Cruces, New Mexico
- KTPN-LD in Tyler, Texas
- KUAN-LD in Poway, California
- KUOC-LD in Enid, Oklahoma
- KVCV-LD in Victoria, Texas
- KVSN-DT in Pueblo, Colorado
- KVTJ-DT in Jonesboro, Arkansas
- KXUN-LD in Sallisaw, Oklahoma
- W13DS-D in Cleveland, Ohio
- W17ED-D in Hornell/Alfred, New York
- W19ET-D in Bath, New York
- W23FN-D in Albany, Georgia
- W26BF-D in Elmira, New York
- W31EL-D in Baton Rouge, Louisiana
- WAFF in Huntsville, Alabama
- WCET in Cincinnati, Ohio
- WDME-CD in Washington, D.C.
- WECY-LD in Elmira, New York
- WEUX in Chippewa Falls, Wisconsin
- WFBD in Destin, Florida
- WFNY-CD in Gloversville, New York
- WFUN-LD in Miami, Florida
- WGTW-TV in Burlington, New Jersey
- WIYC in Troy, Alabama
- WJGV-CD in Palatka, Florida
- WLEH-LD in St. Louis, Illinois
- WMEU-CD in Chicago, Illinois
- WMNT-CD in Toledo, Ohio
- WMYV in Greensboro, North Carolina
- WNTZ-TV in Natchez, Mississippi
- WQSJ-CD in Quebradillas, Puerto Rico
- WRID-LD in Richmond, Virginia
- WRNN-TV in Kingston, New York
- WVLR in Tazewell, Tennessee
- WVOZ-TV on Ponce, Puerto Rico
- WVTN-LD in Corbin, Kentucky
- WWHB-CD in Stuart, Florida
- WYDC in Corning, New York
- WYDN in Worcester, Massachusetts
- WZRA-CD in Oldsmar, Florida

The following stations, which are no longer licensed, formerly operated on virtual channel 48:

- K16IG-D in Cottage Grove, Oregon
- K23NZ-D in Three Forks, Montana
- K48NU-D in Beaumont, Texas
- KDMK-LD in Lafayette, Louisiana
- WCYA-LD in Midland, Michigan
