= 1989 in American television =

In 1989, television in the United States saw a number of significant events, including the debuts, finales, and cancellations of television shows; the launch, closure, and rebranding of channels; changes and additions to network affiliations by stations; controversies, business transactions, and carriage disputes; and the deaths of individuals who had made notable contributions to the medium.

== Notable events ==
Date	Event
January 1	A complicated, six-station network affiliation swap takes place in two South Florida markets. In Miami, WTVJ moves to NBC from CBS, WCIX (now WFOR-TV) moves to CBS from Fox, and WSVN moves to Fox from NBC. Meanwhile, in West Palm Beach, WPEC switches from ABC to CBS, WTVX leaves CBS to become an independent, and ABC station WPBF signs on this day. The swaps result from NBC's acquisition of WTVJ in 1987, and CBS's acquisition of WCIX in August 1988. The switches in West Palm Beach are accomplished due to WCIX's weak signal in Broward County.
January 1	The NBC affiliate in Tampa, WXFL changes its callsign back to WFLA-TV.
January 1	The Karen Carpenter Story, a made-for-television biographical film about singer Karen Carpenter and the brother-and-sister pop music duo of which she was a part, The Carpenters is broadcast on CBS. The movie was popular in the ratings; it was the highest-rated two-hour TV movie of the year and the third highest rated such program on any network during the 1980s.
January 3	The Arsenio Hall Show premieres in first-run syndication. Brooke Shields, Luther Vandross, and Leslie Nielsen appear as guests.
January 7	The television version of the 1983 film Scarface premieres on ABC. 32 minutes of violence, profanity and sex were edited out, and much of the dialogue was muted or replaced with less offensive alternatives.
January 8	Universal Pictures releases a cut of the 1985 film Brazil for airing on their syndicated film package, the Debut Network. Running 93 minutes (as opposed to the 142 minute-long theatrical cut), it was a heavily modified version that remained true to Universal's then-COO Sid Sheinberg's preferred cut of the film (which modified the dark sci-fi satire into an uplifting romance, complete with a happy ending), and was subsequently given the nickname "The Love Conquers All Cut." How this version managed to get released remains a mystery; director Terry Gilliam said that Universal asked him to make an edited-for-television cut of the film and he refused. In an interview with the Los Angeles Times, Gilliam sarcastically complimented Sheinberg for "[getting] a chance to break into TV," but was angry that Universal didn't take his name off the TV cut and also criticized advertisements for the Debut Network premiere of Brazil which used the same critical praise that was given to his version. In an interview with Jack Matthews in an updated version of his book The Battle of Brazil, Sheinberg claimed he had no idea how his cut leaked out, and said that he wasn't the one who ordered that cut to be released.
January 9	Pat Sajak quits the daytime version of the series Wheel of Fortune for a CBS late night talk show while remaining host of the nighttime version. His daytime hosting role will be assumed by Rolf Benirschke, then by Bob Goen when Wheel switches networks from NBC to CBS that July.
January 15	Fox airs an episode of Married... with Children called "Her Cups Runneth Over", which would soon become the main source of Terry Rakolta's moral boycott campaign against the show.
January 21	Mike Myers joins the cast of the NBC series Saturday Night Live.
January 22	Super Bowl XXIII from Miami's Joe Robbie Stadium is broadcast on NBC. This would be the last outdoor Super Bowl to start earlier than 6 p.m. Eastern Standard Time, as it started just after 5 p.m. The halftime show was titled "Be Bop Bamboozled in 3-D" and featured Elvis Presto, played by then-Solid Gold dancer Alex Cole, and hundreds of South Florida-area dancers and performers. Ironically, not one actual Elvis Presley song was performed. Several scenes included computer-generated 3D images. Prior to the game, Coca-Cola distributed 3D glasses at retailers for viewers to use. At the onset of the halftime show, primary sponsor Diet Coke aired the first commercial in 3D. Coca-Cola had originally planned to use the 3D Diet Coke commercial as part of the Moonlighting season finale, which was also aired in 3D, but withdrew plans due to the 1988 Writers Guild of America Strike.
February 5	On the NBC sitcom Day by Day, six cast members from The Brady Bunch (Robert Reed, Florence Henderson, Ann B. Davis, Maureen McCormick, Christopher Knight, and Mike Lookinland) reunite.
February 5	The first part of the four part Western miniseries Lonesome Dove airs on CBS, drawing a huge viewing audience, earning numerous awards, and reviving both the television Western and the miniseries.
February 9	The second edition of the World Wrestling Federation's prime-time series The Main Event airs on NBC. This particular episode is most notable for Randy Savage turning on his tag team partner, Hulk Hogan and thus, setting up their match for Savage's WWF World Heavyweight Championship at WrestleMania V on April 2. The live broadcast of The Main Event would draw an 11.6 rating and 19.9 million viewers.
February 18	The first ever "Wayne's World" sketch featuring Mike Myers and Dana Carvey as Wayne Campbell and Garth Algar respectively, appears on NBC's Saturday Night Live.
February 20	Jane Wyman, an actress on the CBS drama series Falcon Crest, is rushed to the hospital, after suffering from diabetes and a liver ailment.
February 20	Charlie O'Donnell returned to Wheel of Fortune as the announcer, following a nine-year absence.
February 26	ABC broadcasts the made-for-television film Get Smart, Again!, which features Don Adams and Barbara Feldon reprising their characters of Maxwell Smart and Agent 99 from the 1965–1970 NBC/CBS sitcom Get Smart. The relative success of the film prompted the development of a short-lived (only seven episodes) 1995 weekly series on Fox, also titled Get Smart, with Adams and Feldon again reprising their characters.
February 27	CBS airs a pilot for a proposed series called What's Alan Watching?, starring Corin Nemec as the titular Alan, a 17-year-old couch potato who views life, and his family, as if they were on television. The pilot was produced by Eddie Murphy, who also cameos in it as not only a protester decrying James Brown's incarceration, but Brown himself. While CBS ultimately passes on making it a regular series, What's Alan Watching? did win the Television Critics Association's TCA Award for Outstanding Achievement in Movies, Miniseries and Specials.
March 2	Pepsi's controversial advertisement with Madonna and her song "Like a Prayer" airs during NBC's showing of The Cosby Show. The same ad was run on ITV in the UK, 12 minutes into The Bill.
March 10	The series finale of Webster has the eponymous character being transported to the USS Enterprise (NCC-1701-D) from Star Trek: The Next Generation. Michael Dorn guest stars as Lt. Worf.
March 13	The weekday version of Yo! MTV Raps, hosted by Ed Lover and Doctor Dré debuts.
March 19	Return of the Jedi makes its network broadcast television premiere on NBC.
March 19	The Motorcraft Quality Parts 500 is broadcast on ABC. The broadcast is notable because Dr. Jerry Punch, who was reporting from the pit stall of Richard Petty when a fire broke out, proceeded to treat on the spot, two injured crew members. Following the incident, in which several items of Punch's clothing were singed or melted, ESPN mandated that its pit reporters wear fire-retardant suits. Other networks have since adopted the practice.
March 24	For the first time since 1973, NBC reruns the 1960 telecast of Peter Pan, with Mary Martin in the title role. Earlier that day, two of the network's game shows, Sale of the Century and Super Password, aired their final episodes. The following Monday, NBC will return the noon time slot to its affiliates.
March 25	Elvis Costello appears as the musical guest on Saturday Night Live. It's the first time that Costello appeared on SNL in 12 years. Costello had been temporarily banned from appearing on SNL in 1977 after he had abruptly switched songs live against the wishes of his record company and SNL. In 1977, he had originally been scheduled to perform his debut single "Less Than Zero", instead of "Radio Radio", which criticized the commercialization of broadcasting.
March 29	The 61st Academy Awards ceremony is broadcast on ABC. Despite the best Nielsen ratings in five years, it proved to be a career disaster for producer Allan Carr, culminating in the infamous pairing of Snow White (played by Eileen Bowman) and Rob Lowe singing a parody of "Proud Mary." The telecast also included a production number featuring what was introduced as "The Stars of Tomorrow" doing a number entitled "I Wanna Be An Oscar Winner" with all the participants being actors and actresses ranging from the age group of late teens to mid-20s. Due largely to the show's opening number, and despite the show's stellar Nielsen ratings, the show became a laughing-stock and went down in history as one of the worst moments in awards show and television history. The telecast was also remembered for being the final public appearance of actress and comedian Lucille Ball, where she and co-presenter Bob Hope were given a standing ovation. On April 26, almost a month after the ceremony, she died from a dissecting aortic aneurysm at age 77.
April 1	Nickelodeon celebrates its 10th anniversary with the debut of its new Sunday morning variety show Total Panic.
April 8	After a ten-month hiatus, American Bandstand reemerges on the USA Network. David Hirsch took over hosting duties from Dick Clark (who remained on as executive producer) and Bandstand moved outdoors to Universal Studios Hollywood. After 26 weeks on USA, Bandstand signed off for good on October 7, 1989, with The Cover Girls as the final musical guests.
April 30	Bionic Showdown: The Six Million Dollar Man and the Bionic Woman, the second made-for-television reunion film that featured Lee Majors as Steve Austin and Lindsay Wagner as Jaime Sommers is broadcast on NBC. It is also notably the first television appearance of actress Sandra Bullock and the first film which strongly featured her.
May 7	The Trial of the Incredible Hulk, the second film to be based on the 1978–1982 television series, airs on NBC. As was the case with The Incredible Hulk Returns and Thor, this television movie also acted as a backdoor television pilot for a series, in this case, for Daredevil (which was also not produced).
May 8	Top Gun makes its broadcast network television debut on NBC.
May 11	In the series finale of the ABC drama Dynasty, Blake Carrington, Alexis Colby, Dex Dexter, and Fallon Carrington Colby are stuck in mortal peril.
May 11	NBC airs a pilot for a proposed spin-off of 227 centered on Jackée Harry's character Sandra Clark. The pilot however, was not picked up for a series and Jackée subsequently left 227. She would however, later guest star in seven of the final season's episodes.
May 14	NBC broadcasts the series finale of Family Ties followed by the network television premiere of Ferris Bueller's Day Off.
May 14–25	SportsChannel America airs the first of four consecutive Stanley Cup Finals.
May 18	Donna Mills makes her final regular appearance as villainess Abby Cunningham on the CBS drama Knots Landing.
May 20	Original Saturday Night Live cast member Gilda Radner succumbs to ovarian cancer at the age of 42. News of Radner's death broke as Steve Martin was rehearsing to act as the guest host for that night's season finale of SNL. Martin's planned opening monologue was scrapped; in its place a visibly upset Martin introduced a video clip of a 1978 sketch in which he and Radner had parodied Fred Astaire and Cyd Charisse in a well-known dance routine from The Band Wagon (1953). After the clip, Martin said it reminded him of "how great she was and of how young I looked. Gilda, we miss you."
May 21	The two-hour long series finale of Miami Vice airs on NBC. There would however be three "lost episodes" that would be broadcast on NBC over the course of June 1989. A fourth and final "lost episode" entitled "Too Much, Too Late" was instead first broadcast on the USA Network in January 1990, due to its graphic content and a plot vividly involving child molestation.
June 3	Vin Scully does the play-by-play for the NBC Game of the Week in St. Louis, where the Cardinals beat the Chicago Cubs in 10 innings. Meanwhile, the Los Angeles Dodgers are playing a series in Houston, where Scully flies to be on hand to call the Sunday game of the series. However, the Saturday night game between the teams is going into extra innings when Scully arrives in town, so he goes to the Astrodome instead of his hotel. He picks up the play-by-play, helping to relieve the other Dodger announcers, who are doing both television and radio, and broadcasts the final 13 innings (after already calling 10 innings in St. Louis), as the game went 22 innings. He broadcast 23 innings in one day in two different cities.
June 5	For the start of 1989 NBA Finals, CBS completely revamps their opening montage for their NBA broadcasts. The computer-generated imagery (once again set in and around a virtual arena) was made to look more realistic (live-action footage was incorporated in the backdrops). Also, the familiar theme music (an uptempo series of four notes and three bars composed by Allyson Bellink since the 1983 NBA Finals) each was rearranged to sound more intricate and to have a more emotional impact, along the lines of the network's later World Series coverage. Between the 1989 NBA Finals and the 1990 NBA Finals' intros, the theme music was slightly revised; the 1989 Finals intro incorporated more of a guitar riff, while the 1990 Finals intro featured a little more usage of trumpets.
June 8	After broadcasting Major League Baseball games on Monday nights since 1976, ABC launches eight weeks worth of games on Thursday nights, beginning with coverage of the New York Mets against the Chicago Cubs and the San Diego Padres against the Houston Astros.
July 1	In Rochester, New York, NBC affiliate WROC-TV and CBS affiliate WHEC-TV swap affiliations. NBC cites WROC-TV's struggling news ratings as the reason for the switch.
July 4	CBS airs the pilot for a proposed adaptation of the 1988 film Coming to America as an installment for the Summer Showcase anthology series.
July 5	The pilot episode of Seinfeld airs on NBC.
July 7	CBS airs an unsold pilot for a proposed sitcom based on the 1987 film Adventures in Babysitting.
July 11	Former President of the United States Ronald Reagan joins NBC's Vin Scully on commentary for the 1st inning of the Major League Baseball All-Star Game.
July 17	"Shades of Gray", which is the second season finale for Star Trek: The Next Generation, is broadcast in syndication. The episode is notable for being the only time that the series produced what constituted a clip show. This was done as a means of meeting a budget shortfall at season's end due to prior episodes that had cost overruns. The episode also marked the final appearance of the character Dr. Katherine Pulaski (portrayed by Diana Muldaur) and the original Type A TNG Starfleet uniforms, which were introduced in Season 1.
July 18	My Sister Sam star Rebecca Schaeffer is shot and killed by Robert John Bardo, an obsessed fan who had been stalking her.
August 14	Cliff and Nina Warner marry one another for the fourth (and seemingly final) time on the ABC soap opera All My Children, a record that has not been matched for soap operas.
August 23	One year after acquiring the rights to broadcast the 1992 Winter Olympics from Albertville, France, CBS also wins the rights to broadcast the 1994 Winter Olympics from Lillehammer, Norway after bidding $300 million.
August 24	In a press conference that is carried live on CNN and ESPN, Major League Baseball commissioner A. Bartlett Giamatti states that to preserve the integrity of the game of baseball, Pete Rose is banned from the game for life for gambling on baseball. One week after the announcement, Giamatti would die of a massive heart attack at the age of 51.
August 27	The television film L.A. Takedown airs on NBC. Originally filmed as an unsuccessful pilot for a television series, producer and screenwriter Michael Mann would later use L.A. Takedown as the basis for the 1995 film Heat.
September 1	WUTV in Buffalo officially dropped its Fox affiliation, and moved its Fox affiliation over to WNYB-TV. This was because it was disappointed with the network's weak prime time programming offerings.
September 4	The Family Channel debuts its children programming block Fun Town.
September 16	A pilot for a proposed X-Men animated series is first broadcast in syndication. It would take another three years before an X-Men series would be fully realized.
September 22	ABC debuts TGIF from 8:00 p.m. to 10:00 p.m., a new programming block for Friday nights with four shows (Full House, Family Matters, Perfect Strangers, and Just the Ten of Us), it also includes interstitial hosts. This block would become a ratings hit throughout the 1990s, lasting until 2000.
September 24	NBC broadcasts Saturday Night Live's 15th anniversary special.
September 28	Univision broadcasts the final of the 12th National OTI Festival live from the Gusman Center for the Performing Arts in Miami.
September 30	NBC broadcasts its final Major League Baseball Game of the Week (before the program is transferred to CBS). NBC had broadcast the Game of the Week since 1957 and exclusively since 1966. Bob Costas and Tony Kubek called the action from Toronto's SkyDome, as the Toronto Blue Jays defeated the Baltimore Orioles to clinch the American League East Division title.
October 1	NBC affiliate KPOM-TV (now KFTA-TV) in Fort Smith, Arkansas signs-on full-time satellite KFAA-TV (now KNWA-TV) in Rogers to solve transmission problems resulting from its status as an UHF station in a mountainous area. (KFTA-TV will disaffiliate from NBC and join Fox in 2006.)
October 1	Indiana Jones and the Temple of Doom makes its network broadcast television debut on ABC.
October 6	Jane Wyman's medical leave due to her diabetes and liver ailment is written into the CBS drama Falcon Crest, when her character, Angela Channing, is put in a coma.
October 9	The San Francisco Giants defeat the Chicago Cubs in Game 5 of the National League Championship Series to go to the World Series for the first time since 1962. This was also NBC's final Major League Baseball telecast (with Vin Scully and Tom Seaver on the call), having broadcast the sport in some shape or form since 1947. As previously mentioned, the primary network TV package was moving to CBS beginning in 1990. NBC wouldn't broadcast baseball again until the 1994 All-Star Game.
October 17	Four minutes into ABC's broadcast of Game 3 of the World Series, the Lome Prieta earthquake occurred, forcing a ten-day delay of the series. Due to their coverage of the game, ESPN is the first network to broadcast footage from the impacted area. As a consequence of the Loma Prieta earthquake, ABC aired repeat episodes of Roseanne and The Wonder Years amid the initial uncertainty as to whether Game 3 would take place as scheduled; an extended ABC News Special Report – anchored by Ted Koppel from the news division's Washington, D.C. bureau, with Al Michaels (who served as the play-by-play commentator for ABC's World Series coverage that year alongside Jim Palmer and Tim McCarver) acting as a de facto reporter – on the earthquake's immediate aftermath followed those two programs.
October 19–23	Contestant Diane Landry won an accumulated $129,370 cash & prizes over three episodes of air in Wheel of Fortune, which at the time set an all-time winnings record for the show. At the time, the backdrop chyron displays in only five digits due to a game show winnings cap, and host Pat Sajak taped a "$1" cardboard next to the display to accommodate the new total. This scene has been featured in various clip shows videos.
October 26	WSNR-TV, an independent station launches on the air in Syracuse, New York.
October 27	Jane Pauley announces that she will be stepping down as co-anchor of NBC's Today (after 13 years on the air) at the end of the year (with Pauley's last day being on December 29). Today's news reader Deborah Norville is immediately announced as Pauley's successor.
October 28	The World Series finally concludes with the Oakland Athletics sweeping the San Francisco Giants in four games. This would be ABC's final baseball telecast, having covered the sport consecutively since 1976. Like NBC, ABC would lose their baseball package completely to CBS beginning in 1990. ABC would next broadcast Major League Baseball in 1994, when they formed a joint-venture with Major League Baseball and NBC called The Baseball Network.
November 4	The NBA on TNT debuts.
November 7	An episode of the ABC drama Thirtysomething generates a great deal of controversy because it depicts two men in bed together after having had sex. Even though the actors were forbidden to touch each other while in bed together, the controversy proves too much for a number of advertisers, who pull their commercials from the episode. ABC ultimately withdraws the episode from rotation for rebroadcast.
November 9	The National Basketball Association and NBC reaches an agreement on a four-year, US$600 million contract (beginning in the 1990–1991 season), ending CBS' tenure with the NBA after 17 years.
November 16	Michael Jackson makes a surprise appearance on The Arsenio Hall Show during Hall's interview with Eddie Murphy.
November 18	Univision stages the 18th OTI Festival at the theater of the James L. Knight Center in Miami, which is broadcast live throughout Ibero-America.
December 2	Disney purchases Los Angeles independent station KHJ-TV from RKO General, and renames it to KCAL-TV.
December 15	Jaleel White makes his first appearance as Steve Urkel on the ABC sitcom Family Matters.
December 17	Fox broadcasts the series premiere of The Simpsons, "Simpsons Roasting on an Open Fire", which also acts as a Christmas special. The new series is a spin-off of a series of animated sketches that had previously aired on The Tracey Ullman Show. The series proves to be an early hit for Fox, scoring the network's first Nielsen top 30 entry.
December 18	A seldom-seen 1956 Christmas special episode of I Love Lucy is re-broadcast by CBS.
December 29	On The Disney Channel, Stacy Ferguson makes her final appearance on Kids Incorporated. Ferguson is not only the last remaining original cast member, but she is also the longest serving cast member in the series' history. This is also the final episode of Kids Incorporated before it would go on a lengthy hiatus. New episodes wouldn't be broadcast again until November 4, 1991.

== Programs ==
=== Debuting this year ===
The following is a list of shows that premiered in 1989.

Date	Title	Network
January 3	The Arsenio Hall Show	Syndication
January 7	Bordertown	CBN Family Channel
January 7	USA Up All Night	USA Network
January 9	Inside Edition	Syndication
January 9	The Pat Sajak Show	CBS
January 18	A Fine Romance	ABC
January 20	Father Dowling Mysteries	NBC
January 21	Dolphin Cove	CBS
January 21	Nightingales	NBC
January 23	Couch Potatoes	Syndication
January 24	Studio 5-B	ABC
January 28	A Man Called Hawk	ABC
January 28	Long Ago and Far Away	PBS
January 29	Shining Time Station	PBS
February 3	Unsub	NBC
February 28	Coach	ABC
March 1	Hard Time on Planet Earth	CBS
March 7	Anything but Love	ABC
March 11	COPS	Fox
March 20	Heartland	CBS
March 20	Live-In	CBS
March 25	Men	ABC
March 26	Quantum Leap	NBC
March 27	Generations	NBC
April 2	Total Panic	Nickelodeon
April 3	Top Card	TNN
April 5	The Robert Guillaume Show	ABC
April 10	Nearly Departed	NBC
April 13	Dream Street	NBC
April 14	The Jim Henson Hour	NBC
April 18	Rescue 911	CBS
April 18	Have Faith	ABC
April 22	Jesse Hawkes	CBS
May 1	Think Fast!	Nickelodeon
June 4	McGee and Me!	Syndication
June 4	Shannon's Deal	NBC
June 10	Tales from the Crypt	HBO
July 5	Seinfeld	NBC
July 10	Knight & Daye	NBC
July 14	Hey Dude	Nickelodeon
August 3	Primetime Live	ABC
August 12	Comic Strip Live	Fox
August 17	FM	NBC
August 20	Saved by the Bell	NBC
August 28	Open House	Fox
September 2	G.I. Joe: A Real American Hero	Syndication
September 4	Eureeka's Castle	Nick Jr.
September 4	The Super Mario Bros. Super Show!	Syndication
September 5	The Joan Rivers Show	Syndication
September 9	American Gladiators	Syndication
September 9	Captain N: The Game Master	NBC
September 9	The Karate Kid	NBC
September 9	Beetlejuice	ABC
September 9	The Byron Allen Show	Syndication
September 11	3rd Degree	Syndication
September 12	Chicken Soup	ABC
September 12	Life Goes On	ABC
September 13	Wolf	CBS
September 16	The California Raisin Show	CBS
September 16	Dink, the Little Dinosaur	CBS
September 16	Island Son	CBS
September 16	Rude Dog & the Dweebs	CBS
September 16	Teen Summit	BET
September 16	Ring Raiders	Syndication
September 16	Camp Candy	NBC
September 17	Sister Kate	NBC
September 17	Major Dad	CBS
September 18	Alien Nation	Fox
September 18	Everyday with Joan Lunden	Syndication
September 18	Hard Copy	Syndication
September 18	The Famous Teddy Z	CBS
September 18	The People Next Door	CBS
September 20	Top of the Hill	CBS
September 20	A Peaceable Kingdom	CBS
September 20	Doogie Howser, M.D.	ABC
September 20	The Young Riders	ABC
September 20	The Nutt House	NBC
September 22	Baywatch	NBC
September 22	Hardball	NBC
September 22	Family Matters	ABC
September 22	Free Spirit	ABC
September 22	Snoops	CBS
September 23	Saturday Night with Connie Chung	CBS
September 24	Booker	Fox
September 24	Homeroom	ABC
October 2	Make the Grade	Nickelodeon
October 13	Mancuso, F.B.I.	NBC
November 26	America's Funniest Home Videos	ABC
November 30	Ann Jillian	NBC
December 3	True Blue	NBC
December 17	The Simpsons	Fox
December 18	First Business	Syndication

=== Resuming this year ===
Title	Last aired	Previous network	New title	Returning network	Date of return
The Mickey Mouse Club	1979	Syndication	The All-New Mickey Mouse Club	Disney Channel	April 24
You Can't Do That on Television	1987	Nickelodeon	Same	Same	May 8

=== Ending this year ===
Date	Title	Debut
January 7	ALF: The Animated Series	1987
January 13	Ryan's Hope	1975
January 14	Snorks	1984
January 19	Knightwatch	1988
January 21	Dirty Dancing	1988
January 21	Simon & Simon	1981
February 20	Almost Grown	1988
March 2	A Fine Romance	1989
March 9	Webster	1983
March 10	Finders Keepers	1987
March 11	Dolphin Cove	1989
March 18	Good Morning, Miss Bliss	1988
March 18	Murphy's Law	1988
March 24	Sale of the Century	1969
March 24	Super Password	1984
March 25	TV 101	1988
March 31	Card Sharks (returned in 2001)	1978
April 1	She's the Sheriff	1987
April 8	It's a Living	1980
April 14	Unsub	1989
April 26	Nightingales	1989
May 5	Brothers	1984
May 7	Duet	1989
May 11	Dynasty	1981
May 13	A Man Called Hawk	1989
May 14	Family Ties	1982
May 14	Moonlighting	1985
May 19	The Gong Show (returned in 2017)	1976
May 20	Small Wonder	1985
May 21	Miami Vice	1984
May 22	Kate & Allie	1984
June 9	Wipeout	1988
June 9	Couch Potatoes	1989
June 16	Hollywood Squares (returned in 1998)	1966
June 21	Hard Time on Planet Earth	1989
June 23	Relatively Speaking	1988
June 25	Day by Day	1988
July 14	Now You See It	1974
July 27	The Cavanaughs	1986
July 30	The Jim Henson Hour	1989
August 4	Highway to Heaven	1984
August 22	CBS Summer Playhouse	1987
August 24	The Equalizer	1985
September 2	Police Academy	1988
September 8	The Dating Game (returned in 1996)	1965
September 9	West 57th	1985
September 29	ThunderCats	1985
October 7	American Bandstand	1952
October 9	Major League Baseball on NBC (returned in 1994)	1947
October 16	The People Next Door	1989
October 25	The Nutt House	1989
October 28	Major League Baseball on ABC (returned in 1994)	1976
November 7	Chicken Soup	1989
November 15	A Peaceable Kingdom	1989
November 30	The Super Mario Bros. Super Show!	1989
November 30	Top of the Hill	1989
December 1	The Legend of Zelda	1989
December 2	The Smurfs	1981
December 9	The California Raisin Show	1989
December 16	The Karate Kid	1989
December 16	Rude Dog & the Dweebs	1989
December 17	Homeroom	1989

=== Entering syndication ===
Show	Seasons	In production	Notes	Sources
Day by Day	2	No	Cable syndication on Lifetime.	
The Equalizer	4	No	Cable syndication on USA Network.	
HeartBeat	2	No	Cable syndication on Lifetime.	
Highway to Heaven	5	No		
Hollywood Squares	3	No	Cable syndication on USA Network.	
Jim Henson's Muppet Babies	5	Yes		
Mr. Belvedere	5	Yes		
Wipeout	1	No	Cable syndication on USA Network.	

=== Changing networks ===
Show	Moved from	Moved to
Chip 'n Dale Rescue Rangers	The Disney Channel	Syndication
The Mickey Mouse Club	Syndication	The Disney Channel
American Bandstand	Syndication	USA Network
The Hitchhiker	HBO	USA Network
Mystery Science Theater 3000	KTMA	The Comedy Channel
Disney's Adventures of the Gummi Bears	NBC	ABC
Wheel of Fortune	NBC	CBS
Remote Control	MTV	Syndication/MTV

=== Made-for-TV movies and miniseries ===
Title	Network	Date of airing
The Karen Carpenter Story	CBS	January 1
The Brotherhood of the Rose	NBC	January 22 & 23
Mike Hammer: Murder Takes All	CBS	May 21

== Networks and services ==
=== Launches ===
Network	Type	Launch date	Notes	Source
SportsChannel Ohio	Cable television	February 9		
Midwest Sports Channel	Cable television	March 1		
SportsChannel Los Angeles	Cable television	June 30		
Prime Sports Midwest	Cable television	November		
Prime Sports Network Utah	Cable television	November		
The Comedy Channel	Cable television	November 15		
All News Channel	Satellite television	November 30		

=== Conversions and rebrandings ===
Old network name	New network name	Type	Conversion Date	Notes	Source
Home Shopping Club Overnight Service	Home Shopping SPREE	Broadcast and cable television	Unknown		
SuperStation WTBS	TBS Superstation	Cable television	Unknown		
Tempo Television	CNBC	Cable television	April 17		

=== Closures ===
Network	Type	Closure date	Notes	Source
Kraft Golden Showcase Network	Syndicated programming block	Unknown		

== Television stations ==
=== Station launches ===
Date	Market	Station	Channel	Affiliation
January 1	West Palm Beach, Florida	WPBF	25	ABC
January 4	Columbus, Ohio	W23AZ	23	TBN
January 4	Detroit, Michigan	W05BN	5	The Box
January 4	Hilo, Hawaii	K45CT	45	CBS (LPTV translator of KGMB, Honolulu)
January 4	Louisville, Kentucky	W13BZ	13	The Box
January 4	Lubbock, Texas	K22BG	22	Independent
January 15	Bowling Green, Kentucky	WKYU-TV	24	PBS
January 21	Milwaukee, Wisconsin	WJJA	49	HSN
January 23	Cookeville, Tennessee	WMTT	28	Independent
January 26	Lima, Ohio	W67CA	67	Fox
January 27	Klamath Falls/Medford, Oregon	KFTS	22	PBS
January 31	Twin Falls, Idaho	KKVI	35	ABC
February 2	Chicago, Illinois	W54BE	54	Community Independent
February 6	Charlotte, North Carolina	W23AP	23	Independent (primary); America One (secondary)
February 10	Bellingham, Washington, USA (Vancouver, British Columbia, Canada)	KEGA	24	America's Collectables Network
February 12	Tallahassee, Florida	WTLH	49	Fox
February 28	Pittsburgh, Pennsylvania	W59BT	59	Independent (primary); All News Channel (secondary)
March 7	Indianapolis, Indiana	W53AV	53	America One
March 19	New Orleans, Louisiana	WCCL	49	Independent
March 30	Baton Rouge, Louisiana	K65EF	65	Independent
April 2	St. Louis, Missouri	K64DT	64	Daystar
April 3	Wilmington, North Carolina	W10BZ	10	Independent
April 12	La Grange, Georgia	W33AT	33	Independent
April 13	Gainesville, Florida	W31AT	31	The Box
April 14	Salt Lake City, Utah	KXIV	14	Independent
April 15	El Paso, Texas	KSCE	38	Religious independent
April 20	Paradise/Las Vegas, Nevada	KBLR	39	Independent
April 30	Kingsport/Bristol/Johnson City, Tennessee	W30AP	30	Independent
May 3	Bloomington, Indiana	W15AY	15	America One
May 8	Portland, Oregon	KUTF	32	Independent
May 17	Bellevue/Seattle, Washington	KWPX-TV	33	ValueVision
May 22	Cordele/Macon, Georgia	WSST-TV	34	Independent
May 22	Waco, Texas	KCTF	34	PBS
May 29	Detroit, Michigan	WADL	38	Independent
May 29	Norfolk, Virginia	WJCB	49	Religious independent
May 31	Tucson, Arizona	K14HR	14	Independent
May 31	Monterey, California	K67EU	67	Univision
May 31	San Francisco, California	K22DD	22	TBN
June 16	Houston, Texas	KTFH	49	Independent
July 9	San Antonio, Texas	KHCE	23	Trinity Broadcasting Network (O&O)
July 13	Buffalo, New York	W58AV	58	TLC
July 30	Las Vegas, Nevada	KFBT	33	Independent
July 31	Iron Mountain/Marquette, Michigan	WIIM-TV	8	TBN
July 31	Milwaukee, Wisconsin	W46AR	63	Univision
August 7	Toledo, Ohio	WT05	5 (cable-only)	Independent
August 21	Greenville, South Carolina	W58BQ	58	TBN
August 21	Lubbock, Texas	K46CS	46	Telemundo
August 22	Wailuku, Hawaii	KOGG	13	Fox (satellite of KHNL, Honolulu)
August 23	Odessa/Midland, Texas	K60EE	60	Telemundo
August 23	Pittsburgh, Pennsylvania	W29AV	29	The Box
August 28	Kansas City, Missouri	K29CF	29	ValueVision
August 31	Detroit, Michigan	W68CH	68	The Box
September 11	East St. Louis, Illinois (St. Louis, Missouri)	WHSL-TV	46	HSN
September 27	Chicago, Illinois	W04CK	4	The Box
October 1	Anchorage, Alaska	KDMD	33	Independent
October 1	Fayetteville, Arkansas	KFAA-TV	51	NBC
October 1	Hilo, Hawaii	KWHH	14	Independent
October 1	Yakima, Washington	K53CY	53	Fox (as a semi-satellite of KAYU-TV, Spokane)
October 2	Key West, Florida	WEYS	22	Independent
October 6	Traverse City, Michigan	WFQX	33	Fox
October 26	Marion, Indiana	W51BT	51	LeSEA/World Harvest Television
October 26	Milwaukee, Wisconsin	W20AG	20	TBN
October 26	Syracuse, New York	WSNR-TV	43	Independent
October 27	Klamath Falls/Medford, Oregon	KDKF	31	ABC (satellite of KDRV)
November 1	Morehead City, North Carolina (Greenville/New Bern/Washington, NC)	WFXI	8	Fox
November 3	Flagstaff, Arizona	K23FZ	23	3ABN
November 16	Toledo, Ohio	W68CD	68	Daystar
November 27	Gainesville, Florida	W10BR	10	The Box
November 30	Salinas, California	K33DJ	33	Independent
November 30	Wailuku, Hawaii	K26CX	26	CBS (LPTV translator of KGMB)
December 5	Portland, Oregon	KTDZ-TV	24	TBN
December 8	New York City	W38CL	38	The Box
December 18	Bowling Green, Kentucky	WQQB	40	Independent
December 23	Marion, Indiana	W25BN	25	Religious independent
Unknown date	Bayamón, Puerto Rico	W21AR	21	3ABN Latino
Unknown date	Hazleton, Pennsylvania	W35AT	35	Independent
Unknown date	Oklahoma City, Oklahoma	K69EK	69	Independent
Unknown date	South Bend, Indiana	W25BM	25	3ABN

=== Stations changing network affiliation ===
Market	Date	Station	Channel	Prior affiliation	New affiliation
Houston, Texas	November	KTFH	49	Independent	Galavision
Miami/Fort Lauderdale, Florida	January 1	WTVJ	4	CBS	NBC (O&O)
Miami/Fort Lauderdale, Florida	January 1	WCIX	6	Fox	CBS (O&O)
Miami/Fort Lauderdale, Florida	January 1	WSVN	7	NBC	Fox
Raleigh, North Carolina	December 10	WKFT	40	Independent	CBS
Rochester, New York	July 1	WROC-TV	8	NBC	CBS
Rochester, New York	July 1	WHEC-TV	10	CBS	NBC
Buffalo, New York	September 1	WUTV	29	Fox	Independent
Buffalo, New York	September 1	WNYB	49	Independent	Fox
West Palm Beach, Florida	January 1	WPEC	12	ABC	CBS
West Palm Beach, Florida	January 1	WTVX	34	CBS	Independent

=== Station closures ===
Date	Market	Station	Channel	Affiliation
March 31	Concord, New Hampshire	WNHT	21	CBS
June 30	Lexington, Kentucky	WLKT-TV	62	Independent
August 31	Anderson, South Carolina	WAXA	40	Independent
September 17	Charlotte Amalie, U.S. Virgin Islands	WBNB-TV	10	CBS
October 17	Tucson, Arizona	KPOL	40	Independent
Unknown date	Charlotte Amalie, U.S. Virgin Islands	WAIG	43	Independent
Unknown date	Christiansted, U.S. Virgin Islands	WMEG	15	Religious Independent
Unknown date	Christiansted, U.S. Virgin Islands	WTFM-TV	27	Independent

== Births ==
Date	Name	Notability
January 1	Adèle Haenel	French actress
January 3	Alex D. Linz	Actor (The Wacky Adventures of Ronald McDonald, Providence, Hey Arnold!)
January 8	Karan Soni	Actor
January 9	Nina Dobrev	Bulgarian-Canadian actress (Degrassi: The Next Generation, The Vampire Diaries)
January 10	Emily Meade	Actress (The Leftovers)
January 13	Beau Mirchoff	Actor
January 13	Andy Allo	Actress
January 16	Yvonne Zima	Actress (ER, The Young and the Restless)
January 19	Dustin Poirier	Mixed martial artist
January 27	Brooke Butler	Actress
January 30	Kylie Bunbury	Actress
February 1	Margo Pigossi	Brazilian actor (Watercolors of Love, Tangled Hearts, Boogie Oogie, Rules of the Game)
February 2	Ingrid Nilsen	YouTube personality
February 3	Ryne Sanborn	Actor (High School Musical)
February 5	Jeremy Sumpter	Actor (Clubhouse, Friday Night Lights)
February 11	Jesse Rath	Canadian actor (Supergirl, Defiance, No Tomorrow)
February 13	Katie Volding	Actress (Teen Angel)
February 15	Bonnie Dennison	Actress (Third Watch, Guiding Light)
February 16	Elizabeth Olsen	Actress (The Adventures of Mary-Kate & Ashley)
February 17	Chord Overstreet	Actor and singer (Private, Glee)
February 19	Griffin Newman	Actor
February 20	Jack Falahee	Actor (How to Get Away with Murder, Mercy Street)
February 21	Corbin Bleu	Actor (Flight 29 Down, High School Musical)
February 21	Kristin Herrera	Actress (Zoey 101)
February 21	Scout Taylor-Compton	Actress (Charmed)
February 24	Trace Cyrus	American musician and son of Billy Ray Cyrus
February 25	Abby Wilde	Actress (Zoey 101)
February 27	Mike Castle	Actor
March 1	Daniella Monet	Actress (Listen Up, Victorious, Fred: The Show, AwesomenessTV, Baby Daddy, Paradise Run)
March 3	Hayley Marie Norman	Actress
March 5	Sterling Knight	Actor (Sonny with a Chance, So Random!)
March 11	Anton Yelchin	Russian actor (Huff) (d. 2016)
March 15	Caitlin Wachs	Actress (Profiler, Family Affair, Commander in Chief)
March 17	Mason Musso	American musician and singer
March 18	Lily Collins	Actress and daughter of Phil Collins
March 19	Craig Lamar Traylor	Actor (Malcolm in the Middle)
March 25	Aly Michalka	Actress (Phil of the Future, Hellcats)
April 5	Lily James	English actress (Downton Abbey)
April 5	Freddie Fox	Actor
April 8	Gabriella Wilde	English actress
April 9	Bianca Belair	Pro wrestler
April 11	Eka Darville	Australian actor (Power Rangers R.P.M.)
April 15	Andre Kinney	Actor (NYPD Blue, Hannah Montana)
April 18	Alia Shawkat	Actress (Arrested Development)
April 19	Simu Liu	Canadian actor
April 20	Carlos Valdes	Colombian-American actor (The Flash) and singer
April 20	Alex Black	American actor
April 23	Anastasia Baranova	Russian-American actress (Scout's Safari, Z Nation)
April 27	Emily Rios	Actress
April 30	Milo Cawthorne	New Zealand actor (Power Rangers R.P.M.)
May 5	Chris Brown	Singer, actor
May 8	Nora Arnezeder	French actress (Zoo)
May 8	Nyle DiMarco	Actor
May 10	Lindsey Shaw	Actress (Ned's Declassified School Survival Guide, Pretty Little Liars)
May 11	Jadyn Wong	Actress
May 14	Alexandra Park	Australian actress (The Elephant Princess, Home and Away, The Royals)
May 17	Olivia Luccardi	Actress (Orange is the New Black)
May 19	Gaelan Connell	Actor (Level Up)
May 23	Alberto Frezza	Actor (Dead to Summer, Station 19)
May 24	G-Eazy	Rapper
May 25	Lisseth Chavez	Actress
May 29	Brandon Mychal Smith	Actor (Phil of the Future, Hannah Montana, Sonny with a Chance, So Random!, You're the Worst, Rise of the Teenage Mutant Ninja Turtles)
May 29	Riley Keough	Actress (The Girlfriend Experience) and granddaughter of Elvis Presley
May 30	Kevin Covais	Actor
May 31	Justine Lupe	Actress
June 3	Imogen Poots	English actress and singer (Roadies)
June 5	Ana Villafañe	Actress
June 7	Bryn McAuley	Actress
June 9	Logan Browning	Actress (Meet the Browns, Pair of Kings)
June 13	Lisa Tucker	Actress (Zoey 101) and singer
June 14	Lucy Hale	Actress (Pretty Little Liars, Life Sentence)
June 15	Alyssa Farah Griffin	Commentator (The View, CNN)
June 15	Bayley	Pro wrestler
June 18	Renee Olstead	Actress (Still Standing, The Secret Life of the American Teenager)
June 19	Giacomo Gianniotti	Italian-Canadian actor (Grey's Anatomy)
June 19	Will Payne	Actor
June 20	Eve Harlow	Actress (The Guard, Heroes Reborn, The 100)
June 20	Christopher Mintz-Plasse	Actor
June 25	Chris Brochu	Actor (The Vampire Diaries)
June 27	Matthew Lewis	Actor
June 27	Kimiko Glenn	Actress
June 27	Kelley Jakle	Actress
July 1	Hannah Murray	British actress (Game of Thrones) and singer
July 11	David Henrie	Actor (That's So Raven, How I Met Your Mother, Wizards of Waverly Place)
July 12	Phoebe Tonkin	Australian actress (The Secret Circle, The Originals)
July 14	Sean Flynn	Actor (Zoey 101)
July 21	Juno Temple	English actress (Vinyl)
July 21	Rory Culkin	Actor
July 22	Keegan Allen	Actor (Pretty Little Liars)
July 23	Daniel Radcliffe	Actor
July 25	Andrew Caldwell	Voice actor (Randy Cunningham: 9th Grade Ninja)
July 25	Noel Callahan	Actor (Romeo!)
July 29	Jake Smollett	Actor (On Our Own)
July 31	Alexis Knapp	Actress (Ground Floor)
July 31	Jessica Williams	Actress (Just for Kicks, The Daily Show)
July 31	Marshall Williams	Canadian actor
July 31	Zelda Williams	Actress and daughter of Robin Williams
July 31	Joey Richter	Actor
August 8	Ken Baumann	Actor (The Secret Life of the American Teenager)
August 9	Meredith Deane	Actress (Once and Again)
August 9	Paige Spara	Actress (Kevin from Work, The Good Doctor)
August 10	Brenton Thwaites	Australian actor (Home and Away, Titans)
August 15	Carlos PenaVega	Actor (Big Time Rush, Life Sentence, The Loud House) and singer
August 15	Joe Jonas	Actor (Jonas) and singer (Jonas Brothers)
August 15	Denise Oliver	Canadian voice actress (Wayside, Sidekick, Grojband)
August 18	Anna Akana	Actress
August 19	Romeo Miller	Actor (Romeo!) and rapper
August 21	Hayden Panettiere	Actress (Heroes, Nashville) and singer (d. 2026)
August 22	Langley Fox	Actress
August 23	Breanna Conrad	Actress (Laguna Beach: The Real Orange County)
August 28	Cassadee Pope	American pop and country singer
September 5	Kat Graham	Swiss-born American actress (The Vampire Diaries, Rise of the Teenage Mutant Ninja Turtles)
September 7	Jonathan Majors	Actor
September 14	Jessica Brown Findlay	English actress (Downton Abbey)
September 14	Logan Henderson	Actor (Big Time Rush) and singer
September 18	Lexie Contursi	Actress (Laguna Beach: The Real Orange County)
September 19	Lorenza Izzo	Actress
September 21	Jason Derulo	Singer
September 25	Jordan Gavaris	Canadian actor (Unnatural History, Orphan Black)
September 26	Emma Rigby	English actress (Once Upon a Time in Wonderland)
September 27	Ava Deluca-Verley	Actress
September 29	Adore Delano	Singer and drag queen (American Idol, RuPaul's Drag Race)
October 1	Brie Larson	Actress (United States of Tara)
October 4	Dakota Johnson	Actress (Ben and Kate) and daughter of Don Johnson and Melanie Griffith
October 10	Aimee Teegarden	Actress (Friday Night Lights, Aim High, Star-Crossed)
October 13	Skyler Page	Voice actor (Clarence)
October 14	Mia Wasikowska	Australian actress (In Treatment)
October 16	Jack Salvatore Jr.	Actor (Zoey 101, 10 Things I Hate About You)
October 24	Eliza Taylor	Australian actress (The 100)
October 24	Shenae Grimes	Canadian actress (90210)
October 28	Robert Bailey Jr.	Actor
November 2	Katelyn Tarver	Actress (Big Time Rush, No Ordinary Family)
November 6	Aaron Hernandez	Football player (d. 2017)
November 7	Charlie Saxton	Actor
November 10	Taron Egerton	British actor and singer (The Dark Crystal: Age of Resistance, Moominvalley)
November 14	Stella Maeve	Actress
November 16	Iamsu!	Singer
November 19	Tyga	Rapper
November 20	Cody Linley	Actor (Hannah Montana)
November 22	Alden Ehrenreich	Actor
November 22	Candice Glover	Singer (American Idol)
November 22	Jon Rudnitsky	Actor (Saturday Night Live)
November 30	Adelaide Clemens	Australian actress (Rectify)
December 7	Nicholas Hoult	English actor (Skins) and singer
December 7	Caleb Landry Jones	Actor
December 10	Symone Sanders-Townsend	Political commentator (CNN, MSNBC)
December 13	Taylor Swift	Singer and actress (Saturday Night Live)
December 15	Nichole Bloom	Actress (Shameless, Superstore, OK K.O.! Let's Be Heroes)
December 18	Ashley Benson	Actress (Pretty Little Liars)
December 22	Jordin Sparks	Singer (American Idol) and actress
December 28	Mackenzie Rosman	Actress (7th Heaven)
December 29	Jane Levy	Actress (Suburgatory)
December 30	Ryan Sheckler	Actor (Life of Ryan)

== Deaths ==
Date	Name	Age	Notability
February 5	Joe Raposo	51	Composer (Sesame Street, The Electric Company, Three's Company theme song)
February 11	George O'Hanlon	76	Voice actor (voice of George Jetson on The Jetsons)
April 26	Lucille Ball	77	Actress, comedian (of the Lucy shows I Love Lucy, The Lucy Show, Here's Lucy)
April 30	Guy Williams	65	Actor (Zorro, Lost in Space)
May 1	Douglass Watson	68	Soap opera actor (Mac on Another World)
May 20	Gilda Radner	42	Actress, comedian (Saturday Night Live)
June 15	Victor French	54	Actor, director (Little House on the Prairie, Carter Country, Highway to Heaven)
July 3	Jim Backus	76	Actor (Thurston Howell III on Gilligan's Island and voice of Mr. Magoo)
July 4	Vic Perrin	73	Voice actor (original Control Voice on The Outer Limits, Hanna-Barbera cartoons)
July 10	Mel Blanc	81	Voice actor (as Bugs Bunny, Daffy Duck, and countless other characters)
July 18	Rebecca Schaeffer	21	Actress (My Sister Sam)
August 16	Amanda Blake	60	Actress (Miss Kitty Russell on Gunsmoke)
September 17	Jay Stewart	71	Announcer (Let's Make a Deal, Sale of the Century, Scrabble)
October 6	Bette Davis	81	Film and television actress
November 27	Bob Quigley	77	Game show producer (The Hollywood Squares, High Rollers, Gambit)
December 6	Frances Bavier	86	Actress (Aunt Bee on The Andy Griffith Show)

== Television debuts ==
- Daniel Baldwin – Family Ties
- William Baldwin – The Preppie Murder
- Sandra Bullock – Bionic Showdown: The Six Million Dollar Man and the Bionic Woman
- Michael Chiklis – Miami Vice
- Faizon Love – L.A. Friday
- Tim Blake Nelson – The Unnaturals
- Robert Patrick – The New Lassie
- Stephen Root – Cross of Fire
- Isabella Rossellini – The Tracey Ullman Show
- Tom Sizemore – Gideon Oliver
- Lea Thompson – Nightbreaker

== See also ==
- 1989 in the United States
- List of American films of 1989
