= WIYE =

WIYE may refer to:

- WIYE-LD, a television station (channel 26) licensed to Parkersburg, West Virginia, United States
- WACX, a television station (channel 55) licensed to Leesburg, Florida, United States, which formerly used the WIYE call sign
