= WHVL =

WHVL may refer to:

- WHVL-LD, a low-power television station (channel 27, virtual 29) licensed to serve State College, etc., Pennsylvania, United States
- WHVL-LP, a defunct low-power television station (channel 29) formerly licensed to serve State College, Pennsylvania
- WTZQ, a radio station (1600 AM) licensed to Hendersonville, North Carolina, United States, which held the call sign WHVL until December 1986
