= KBWF =

KBWF may refer to:

- KBWF-LD, a low-power television station (channel 29, virtual 15) licensed to serve Sioux City, Iowa, United States
- KGMZ-FM, a radio station (95.7 FM) licensed to serve San Francisco, California, United States, which held the call sign KBWF from 2007 to 2011
