= KNTS =

KNTS may refer to:

- KNTS (AM), a radio station (1680 AM) licensed to Seattle, Washington, United States
- KNTS-LP, a defunct low-power television station (channel 17) formerly licensed to Natchitoches, Louisiana, United States
- KNTS, or Knot (unit), speed in naval nodes equals 1.852 km/h in International System
