= WILC =

WILC may refer to:

- World Indoor Lacrosse Championship
- WILC-CD, a low-power television station (channel 27, virtual 6) licensed to serve Sugar Grove, Illinois, United States
- WACA (AM), a radio station (900 AM) licensed to serve Laurel, Maryland, United States, which held the call sign WILC from 1985 to 2018
