= WYDN =

Television station in Lowell, Massachusetts

- Lowell–Boston, Massachusetts; Manchester, New Hampshire; United States
- City: Lowell, Massachusetts (Note: Originally licensed to Worcester, Massachusetts; moved to Lowell in 2018.)
- Channels: Digital: 23 (UHF), shared with WPXG-TV; Virtual: 48

Programming
- Affiliations: 48.1: Daystar

Ownership
- Owner: Word of God Fellowship, Inc.; (Educational Public TV Corporation)

History
- First air date: May 5, 1999
- Former channel numbers: Analog: 48 (UHF, 1999–2009); Digital: 47 (UHF, 2005–2018), 33 (UHF, 2018–2019)
- Former affiliations: Prime Time Christian Broadcasting (1999–2001)
- Call sign meaning: backronym for "Your Daystar Network" (pre-dated ownership and existence of Daystar; call sign sequentially assigned by the FCC in 1989 (Note: Other stations assigned call signs that same day include WYDC in Corning, New York, and WYDO in Greenville, North Carolina.))

Technical information
- Licensing authority: FCC
- Facility ID: 18783
- ERP: 80.6 kW
- HAAT: 342 m (1,122 ft)
- Transmitter coordinates: 43°11′4″N 71°19′10″W
- Translator(s): W26EU-D Boston

Links
- Public license information: Public file; LMS
- Website: www.daystar.com

WYDN (channel 48) is a religious television station licensed to Lowell, Massachusetts, United States, broadcasting the Daystar Television Network to the Boston area. It is owned by the Educational Public TV Corporation, a subsidiary of Daystar sister company Word of God Fellowship, Inc. WYDN's studios are co-located with those of local public access channel Dedham TV on Sprague Street in Dedham, and it shares spectrum with Concord, New Hampshire–licensed Ion Television station WPXG-TV (channel 21), transmitting from Fort Mountain near Epsom, New Hampshire.

== History ==
The station first signed on the air on May 5, 1999, as an affiliate of Prime Time Christian Broadcasting (now God's Learning Channel) as a straight simulcast of KMLM in Odessa, Texas. Originally licensed to Worcester, Massachusetts, WYDN operated its analog transmitter atop Asnebumskit Hill in Paxton (a site which is and has been used by Worcester area FM and TV stations since FM pioneer Edwin Howard Armstrong erected the tower in the 1940s) until the June 12, 2009, digital transition; its digital transmitter operated from the WBZ-TV tower in Needham. By the early 2000s, the station switched to Daystar after it was acquired by its Word of God Fellowship, Inc. licensing subsidiary, and Daystar immediately pushed for successful must-carry carriage from local cable providers.

WYDN sold its frequency rights as part of the Federal Communications Commission (FCC)'s 2017 spectrum incentive auction and reached a channel sharing agreement with Ion Television O&O WPXG-TV; it began broadcasting from WPXG's transmitter on April 23, 2018. As WPXG's broadcasting radius does not cover Worcester, WYDN changed its city of license to Lowell, Massachusetts.

== Technical information ==
WPXG-TV and WYDN transmit using WPXG-TV's spectrum from a tower on Fort Mountain near Epsom, New Hampshire.

Subchannels of WPXG-TV and WYDN
License	Subchannel	Res.	Short name	Programming
WPXG-TV	21.1	720p	ION	Ion Television
WPXG-TV	21.2	480i	Mystery	Ion Mystery
WPXG-TV	21.3	480i	Laff	Busted
WPXG-TV	21.4	480i	Bounce	Bounce TV
WPXG-TV	21.5	480i	IONPlus	Ion Plus
WPXG-TV	21.6	480i	GameSho	Game Show Central
WPXG-TV	21.8	480i	HSN2	HSN2
WYDN	48.1	480i	WYDN	Daystar

=== Analog-to-digital conversion ===
WYDN shut down its analog signal, over UHF channel 48, on June 12, 2009, the official date on which full-power television stations in the United States transitioned from analog to digital broadcasts under federal mandate. The station's digital signal continued to broadcast on its pre-transition UHF channel 47, using virtual channel 48.

== See also ==
- Channel 33 digital TV stations in the United States
- Channel 48 virtual TV stations in the United States
- List of television stations in Massachusetts
- List of Daystar (TV network) affiliates
