= KUAN-LD =

Television station in Poway, California

- Poway–San Diego, California; United States
- City: Poway, California
- Channels: Digital: 17 (UHF), shared with KNSD; Virtual: 48
- Branding: Telemundo 20 (cable channel); Noticiero Telemundo 20

Programming
- Affiliations: 48.1: Telemundo; 48.2: TeleXitos

Ownership
- Owner: Telemundo Station Group; (NBC Telemundo License LLC)
- Sister stations: KNSD

History
- First air date: 1980
- Former call signs: K48AL (1980–2007); KUAN-LP (2007–2016)
- Former channel numbers: Analog: 48 (UHF, 1980–2016); Digital: 36 (UHF, 2016–2017), 40 (UHF, 2017–2019)
- Former affiliations: Independent (1980–2017, as translator of KSCI)

Technical information
- Licensing authority: FCC
- Facility ID: 35609
- ERP: 387 kW
- HAAT: 577 m (1,893 ft)
- Transmitter coordinates: 32°41′48.7″N 116°56′9.2″W

Links
- Public license information: LMS
- Website: www.telemundo20.com

KUAN-LD (channel 48, cable channel 20) is a television station licensed to Poway, California, United States, serving as the San Diego–area outlet for the Spanish-language network Telemundo. It is owned and operated by NBCUniversal's Telemundo Station Group alongside NBC station KNSD (channel 39). The two stations share studios on Granite Ridge Drive in the Serra Mesa section of San Diego. Despite KUAN-LD legally holding a low-power license, it transmits using KNSD's full-power spectrum from an antenna southeast of Spring Valley. This ensures complete reception across the San Diego television market.

KUAN is known on-air as Telemundo 20; as with KNSD's main branding, it is derived from its channel 20 cable position on Charter Spectrum, Cox Communications and AT&T U-verse.

== History ==
The station signed on in 1980 as K48AL, originally operating as a translator of Los Angeles–based multicultural independent KSCI for the San Diego market, airing on low-power analog channel 48. It flash-cut to digital channel 36 on June 20, 2016.

In January 2017, NBC announced that it was hiring people for KNSD with the intention of launching a new Telemundo O&O station in San Diego, replacing Tijuana, Mexico-based station XHAS-TDT (whose affiliation expired at the end of June 2017). The new Telemundo affiliate, branded as "Telemundo 20", launched on July 1 on KNSD's digital 39.20 subchannel. As with KGTV's former Azteca América affiliation using their 10.15 subchannel (which XHAS would take over), the unusual numbering was to connect to Telemundo's channel 20 cable position on Cox Communications and other pay TV providers in the area, which was transferred from XHAS. Additionally, KNSD launched TeleXitos, a Spanish equivalent to Cozi TV, on channel 39.21 the same day.

On September 12, 2017, NBCUniversal acquired KUAN from NRJ TV, LLC, the owner of KSCI, for $650,000; the sale was completed on December 20, 2017. Concurrently, KUAN entered into a channel-sharing agreement with KNSD. This was done with the separate KUAN-LD transmitter ending service, and 39.20 and 39.21 becoming identified with KUAN-LD instead and re-numbered to KUAN's channel 48.

== News operation ==
KUAN broadcasts 12 hours of locally produced newscasts each week. Newscasts were launched on July 3, 2017. KUAN is one of the 11 Telemundo owned and operated stations that do not produce midday newscasts.

== Subchannels ==
KNSD and KUAN-LD transmit from San Miguel Mountain.

Subchannels of KNSD and KUAN-LD
License	Subchannel	Res.	Short name	Programming
KNSD	39.1	1080i	KNSD-DT	NBC
KNSD	39.2	480i	COZI-TV	Cozi TV
KNSD	39.3	480i	CRIMES	NBC True CRMZ
KNSD	39.4	480i	OXYGEN	Oxygen
KUAN-LD	48.1	1080i	KUAN-LD	Telemundo
KUAN-LD	48.2	480i	TELX-LD	TeleXitos

== See also ==
- Channel 17 digital TV stations in the United States
- Channel 48 virtual TV stations in the United States
- Channel 20 branded TV stations in the United States
