= WACX =

Television station in Leesburg, Florida

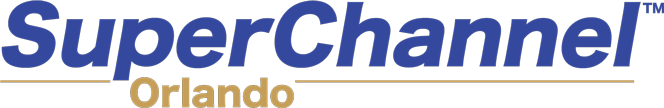
- Leesburg–Orlando, Florida; United States
- City: Leesburg, Florida
- Channels: Digital: 7 (VHF); Virtual: 55
- Branding: SuperChannel Orlando

Programming
- Affiliations: 55.1: Religious Independent; for others, see § Subchannels

Ownership
- Owner: SuperChannel Worship Ministries, Inc.

History
- Founded: October 28, 1977
- First air date: March 6, 1982
- Former call signs: WIYE (1982–1988)
- Former channel numbers: Analog: 55 (UHF, 1982–2006); Digital: 40 (UHF, until 2020)
- Former affiliations: TBN (1990s–2006)

Technical information
- Licensing authority: FCC
- Facility ID: 60018
- ERP: 49.2 kW
- HAAT: 510.5 m (1,675 ft)
- Transmitter coordinates: 28°35′12.6″N 81°4′57.5″W
- Translator(s): WJGV-CD 48.2 Palatka

Links
- Public license information: Public file; LMS
- Website: superchannel.com

WACX (channel 55), branded as SuperChannel Orlando, is a religious independent television station licensed to Leesburg, Florida, United States, serving the Orlando area. Locally owned by SuperChannel Worship Ministries, Inc., the station maintains studios on W. Central Parkway in Altamonte Springs, and its transmitter is located near Bithlo, Florida.

WACX operates on a commercial license, even though it, like most religious stations, is supported through donations from viewers. Its schedule consists primarily of national and local religious programming.

== History ==
WACX first signed on the air on March 6, 1982, as WIYE, operating on analog channel 55. However, it has roots in a local Christian cable channel begun by Claud and Freeda Bowers in 1977.

Channel 55's signal originally did not make it too far out of Lake County. However, the station had grown enough that by 1987 it was able to move to a new transmitter capable of 5 million watts of power, boosting its coverage area to the entire Central Florida area. It became WACX in 1988, and began branding itself as "SuperChannel 55" because at the time it was the only station in the area airing at the maximum power allowed for a UHF station. (The WIYE calls now reside at a low-power CBS affiliate in Parkersburg, West Virginia.)

From the 1990s through September 2006, WACX was affiliated with TBN, regularly airing select programs from the network (including serving as the source feed for TBN on the Sky Angel religious satellite system as Superchannel TBN); this affiliation ceased after TBN acquired WTGL-TV (channel 52) in Cocoa and changed its call sign to WHLV-TV. Since then, the station has regularly featured programming from The Inspiration Network (INSP) and periodically from God TV.

== Technical information ==
=== Subchannels ===
The station's signal is multiplexed:

Subchannels of WACX
Subchannel	Res.	Short name	Programming
55.1	480i	WACX-D1	Main WACX programming
55.2	480i	WACX-D2	Aliento Vision
55.3	480i	WACX-D3	Shop LC
55.4	480i	WACX-D4	SonLife
55.5	480i	WACX-D5	QVC2
55.6	480i	WACX-D6	Victory Channel
55.7	480i	WACX-D7	In Touch Ministries
55.8	480i	WACX-D8	CBN News
55.9	480i	WACX-D9	TV Connect USA
55.10	480i	WACXD10	[Blank]
55.11	480i	WACXD11	[Blank]
55.12	480i	WACXD12	Greater Love TV
55.13	480i	WACXD13	NRB TV
55.14	480i	WACXD14	One America Plus
55.15	480i	WACXD15	Simulcast of WJGV-CD

Simulcast of subchannels of another station

=== Analog-to-digital conversion ===
WACX shut down its analog signal, over UHF channel 55, in March 2006. The station's digital signal continued to broadcast on its pre-transition UHF channel 40, using virtual channel 55.

=== Translator ===
Programming from WACX's main channel is carried on a digital subchannel of WJGV-CD (channel 48) in Palatka.

==== Former translators ====
Previously, WACX operated a network of translators which rebroadcast its signal into other parts of Florida:

Area served	City of license	Callsign	Channel	Notes
Tallahassee	Madison	W03AO	3	License canceled on September 24, 2013
Tallahassee	Tallahassee	WACX-LP	9	Sold to Restoration Place, Inc. in August 2011 (now WWRP-LP); license canceled on February 2, 2021.
Tampa Bay	Lakeland	WLWA-LP	14	Went dark on June 15, 2006, after losing its transmitter site; license canceled on April 24, 2009.
Gainesville	Alachua	W69AY	69	Replaced with digital translator W40CQ-D (now WACX-LD); license canceled on March 27, 2009.
Gainesville	Alachua	WACX-LD	32	Sold to Watchmen Broadcasting Productions International in 2022; no longer relays WACX.

== Majesty Building ==
In 2001, Claud Bowers, the general manager of WACX, began construction of the Majesty Building, an 18-story office building in Altamonte Springs. However, no work was done on the building, which has been dubbed "The I-4 Eyesore" by many locals in the area, for over two decades. Construction largely resumed in 2018, but the building remains incomplete as of 2025.
