= WJGV-CD =

Television station in Palatka, Florida

- Palatka, Florida; United States
- Channels: Digital: 25 (UHF); Virtual: 48
- Branding: Gospel Vision TV

Programming
- Affiliations: 48.1: Religious Ind./NRB Network; for others, see § Subchannels

Ownership
- Owner: Pentecostal Revival Assoc., Inc.

History
- Founded: February 23, 1989
- First air date: March 19, 1992
- Former call signs: W49AW (1989–1995); WJGV-LP (1995–2009)
- Former channel numbers: Analog: 49 (UHF, 1989–2009); Digital: 48 (UHF, 2009–2011)

Technical information
- Licensing authority: FCC
- Facility ID: 52240
- Class: CD
- ERP: 9.5 kW
- HAAT: 90 m (295 ft)
- Transmitter coordinates: 29°34′48.9″N 81°41′56.4″W
- Translator(s): WACX 55.15 Leesburg

Links
- Public license information: Public file; LMS
- Website: www.gospelvisiontv.com

WJGV-CD (channel 48) is a low-power, Class A religious independent television station in Palatka, Florida, United States. The station is owned by the Pentecostal Revival Association. WJGV-CD's studios are located on SR 19 in Palatka, and its transmitter is located southwest of the city.

== History ==
A construction permit was granted for W49AW on February 23, 1989. The station signed on the air on March 19, 1992. It changed its callsign to WJGV-LP in 1995, then flash-cut to digital as WJGV-CD on channel 48 in 2009. The station moved to channel 25 in 2011.

== Subchannels ==
The station's signal is multiplexed:

Subchannels of WJGV-CD
Subchannel	Res.	Short name	Programming
48.1	480i	WJGV	Main WJGV-CD programming
48.2	480i	Victory	Victory Channel (4:3)
48.3	480i	Super	Simulcast of WACX
48.4	480i	WALK	The Walk TV

Simulcast of subchannel of another station
