= Channel 27 TV stations in Mexico =

The following television stations broadcast on digital channel 27 in Mexico:

- XHBAB-TDT in Bahía Asunción, Baja California Sur
- XHBF-TDT in Navojoa, Sonora
- XHBG-TDT in Uruapan, Michoacán de Ocampo
- XHBJ-TDT in Tijuana, Baja California
- XHCHF-TDT in Chetumal, Quintana Roo
- XHCHW-TDT in Ciudad Acuña, Coahuila
- XHCOC-TDT in Ciudad Constitución, Baja California Sur
- XHCOV-TDT in Coatzacoalcos, Veracruz de Ignacio de la Llave
- XHCPPV-TDT in Puerto Vallarta, Jalisco
- XHCPZ-TDT in Sombrerete, Zacatecas
- XHCTCO-TDT in Colima, Colima
- XHCTCR-TDT in Tuxtla Gutiérrez, Chiapas
- XHCTZA-TDT in Zacatecas, Zacatecas
- XHCUR-TDT in Cuernavaca, Morelos
- XHECA-TDT in Escárcega, Campeche
- XHFRT-TDT in Frontera, Tabasco
- XHGVK-TDT in Victoria, Guanajuato
- XHHUH-TDT in Huejutla de Reyes, Hidalgo
- XHIZG-TDT in Ixtapa-Zihuatanejo, Guerrero
- XHKD-TDT in Ciudad Valles, San Luis Potosí
- XHLGT-TDT in León, Guanajuato
- XHMLA-TDT in Monclova, Coahuila de Zaragoza
- XHMSI-TDT in Los Mochis, Sinaloa
- XHNCG-TDT in Nuevo Casas Grandes, Chihuahua
- XHOMC-TDT in Arriaga, Chiapas
- XHOXX-TDT in Oaxaca, Oaxaca
- XHPAP-TDT in Santiago Papasquiaro, Durango
- XHQRO-TDT in Cancún, Quintana Roo
- XHRTNA-TDT in Acaponeta-Tecuala, Nayarit
- XHSCJ-TDT in Santa Catarina Juquila, Oaxaca
- XHSJT-TDT in San José Del Cabo, Baja California Sur
- XHSPRHA-TDT in Hermosillo, Sonora
- XHTEM-TDT in Puebla, Puebla
- XHTMCA-TDT in Campeche, Campeche
- XHTMYU-TDT in Valladolid-Tizimín, Yucatán
- XHTRES-TDT in México City
- XHUDG-TDT in Guadalajara, Jalisco
- XHXEM-TDT in Jocotitlán, México
