= Channel 48 low-power TV stations in the United States =

The following low-power television stations broadcast on digital or analog channel 48 in the United States:

- K48GV-D in Laketown, etc., Utah
- K48KJ-D in Geneva, Minnesota, to move to channel 21
- KHVM-LD in Minneapolis, Minnesota, to move to channel 18

The following television stations, which are no longer licensed, formerly broadcast on digital or analog channel 48 in the United States:

- K48AE in Woodland & Kamas, Utah
- K48BL in Terrebonne-Bend, etc., Oregon
- K48ED in Fillmore, etc., Utah
- K48EH in Tucumcari, New Mexico
- K48FG in Fairbanks, Alaska
- K48FZ in Ames, Iowa
- K48GI-D in Flagstaff, Arizona
- K48GX in Tucson, Arizona
- K48GY in Carrizozo, etc., New Mexico
- K48HU in Wichita Falls, Texas
- K48IJ-D in Preston, Idaho
- K48IQ in Billings, Montana
- K48JH-D in Capulin, etc., New Mexico
- K48KB in Chico, California
- K48LL-D in Kingsville-Alice, Texas
- K48LM in Carlin, Nevada
- K48MH-D in Roswell, New Mexico
- K48NU-D in Beaumont, Texas
- K48NY-D in Gainesville, Texas
- K48OQ-D in Lowry, South Dakota
- KDMK-LD in Lafayette, Louisiana
- KDPH-LP in Phoenix, Arizona
- KLBB-LP in Lubbock, Texas
- KNCV-LP in Carson City, etc., Nevada
- KOAZ-LP in O'Neill, Nebraska
- KROL-LP in Rolla, Missouri
- KTDO-LP in El Paso, Texas
- KTFA-LP in Albuquerque, New Mexico
- W48AO in Auburn, New York
- W48AV in Detroit, Michigan
- W48DT-D in Guayanilla, Puerto Rico
- WAZW-LP in Winchester, Virginia
- WLWN-LP in Sarasota, Florida
- WSSF-LP in Fayette, Alabama
- WSVL-LP in Keysville, Virginia
