= Channel 48 digital TV stations in the United States =

The following television stations broadcast on digital channel 48 in the United States:

- K48GV-D in Laketown, etc., Utah, on virtual channel 13, which rebroadcasts KSTU
- K48KJ-D in Geneva, Minnesota, to move to channel 21
- KHVM-LD in Minneapolis, Minnesota, to move to channel 18, on virtual channel 48

The following television stations, which are no longer licensed, formerly broadcast on digital channel 48 in the United States:

- K48GI-D in Flagstaff, Arizona
- K48IJ-D in Preston, Idaho
- K48JH-D in Capulin, etc., New Mexico
- K48LL-D in Kingsville-Alice, Texas
- K48MH-D in Roswell, New Mexico
- K48NU-D in Beaumont, Texas
- K48NY-D in Gainesville, Texas
- K48OQ-D in Lowry, South Dakota
- KDMK-LD in Lafayette, Louisiana
- W48DT-D in Guayanilla, Puerto Rico
