= KGHB-CD =

Television station in Pueblo, Colorado

- Pueblo–Colorado Springs, Colorado; United States
- City: Pueblo, Colorado
- Channels: Digital: 21 (UHF); Virtual: 27
- Branding: UniMás Colorado Springs

Programming
- Affiliations: 27.1: UniMás; 27.2: Estrella TV

Ownership
- Owner: Entravision Communications; (Entravision Holdings, LLC)
- Sister stations: KVSN-DT

History
- Founded: August 21, 1990
- Former call signs: K26DI (1990–1991); K27DU (1991–1995); KCEC-LP (1995–1997); KGHB-LP (1997–2001); KGHB-CA (2001–2011)
- Former channel numbers: Analog: 26 (UHF, 1990–1991), 27 (UHF, 1991–2010); Digital: 27 (UHF, 2011–2017)
- Former affiliations: Univision (1990–2009)

Technical information
- Licensing authority: FCC
- Facility ID: 24515
- Class: CD
- ERP: 15 kW
- HAAT: 133.4 m (438 ft)
- Transmitter coordinates: 38°22′21.4″N 104°33′39.9″W
- Translator(s): KVSN-DT 48.2 Pueblo

Links
- Public license information: Public file; LMS

KGHB-CD (channel 27) is a low-power, Class A television station licensed to Pueblo, Colorado, United States, serving the Colorado Springs area as an affiliate of the Spanish-language networks UniMás and Estrella TV. It is owned by Entravision Communications alongside Univision affiliate KVSN-DT (channel 48, also licensed to Pueblo). KGHB-CD's transmitter is located on Baculite Mesa north of Pueblo.

Even though KGHB broadcasts a digital signal of its own, its broadcast radius just barely reaches Colorado Springs. The station is therefore simulcast on KVSN's second digital subchannel in order to cover the entire market. This can be seen on channel 48.2 from a transmitter on Cheyenne Mountain.

== Subchannel ==
Subchannel of KGHB-CD
Subchannel	Res.	Short name	Programming
27.1	1080i	UniMas	UniMás
27.2	480i	Estrlla	Estrella TV
