= Channel 27 TV stations in Canada =

The following television stations broadcast on digital or analog channel 27 in Canada:

- CBWT-DT in Winnipeg, Manitoba
- CFMT-DT-2 in Ottawa, Ontario
- CHAU-DT-11 in Kedgwick, New Brunswick
- CHBC-DT in Kelowna, British Columbia
- CHNB-DT-3 in Moncton, New Brunswick
- CIII-DT-27 in Peterborough, Ontario
- CKVU-DT-2 in Victoria, British Columbia
