= NRB TV =

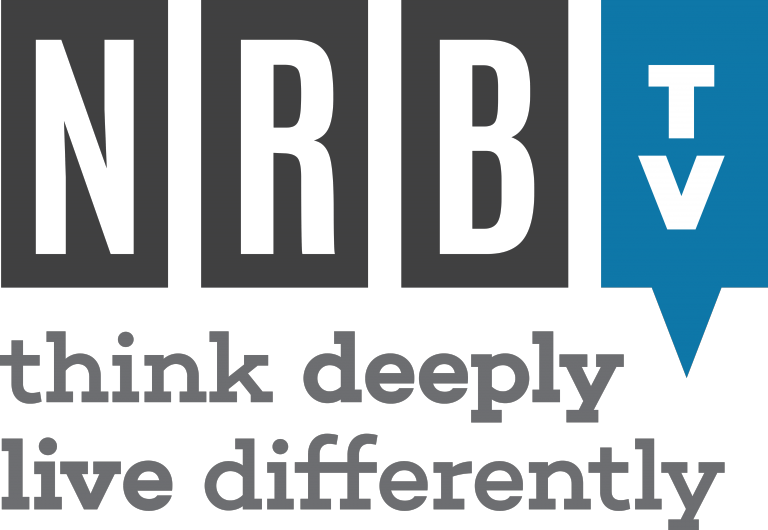
- Country: United States
- Headquarters: Nashville, Tennessee

Ownership
- Owner: National Religious Broadcasters

History
- Launched: December 21, 2005 (19 years ago)

Links
- Website: nrbtv.org

NRB TV is an evangelical Christian cable channel founded by members of the National Religious Broadcasters, an international association of Christian communicators. While the NRB association is located in Manassas, Virginia, the channel's corporate headquarters is located in Nashville, Tennessee. Created in 2005, the network can be seen on DirecTV & Dish Network satellites along broadcast affiliates. Programming can also be streamed from a number of online sources.

== Programming ==
Like the NRB association itself, the programming on NRB TV advocates conservative Christianity, particularly Protestantism and evangelicalism. Many programs broadcast on the NRB Network are produced by members of the National Religious Broadcasters association.

NRB TV broadcasts content in various formats, including talk shows, dramas, reality shows and documentaries. Weekday morning programming includes Renewing Your Mind with R.C. Sproul, Precepts for Life with Kay Arthur, Quick Study with Rod Hembree. The channel's daytime schedule is targeted to a female audience with fitness programs and talk shows that include New Life Live with Steve Arterburn, The 700 Club, and Babbie's House, which is hosted by CCM recording artist Babbie Mason. NRB TV's primetime lineup features an emphasis on Christian apologetics and includes apologists William Lane Craig, Ken Ham and John Lennox.

Weekend programming on the channel includes children's programming on Saturday mornings and teen-aimed programs in the evening. Sunday programming is dedicated to teaching and preaching shows from all of the pastors representing a variety of evangelical denominations. Among NRB TV's Sunday lineup are: Turning Point Ministries (with David Jeremiah), Live at Thomas Road (with Jonathan Falwell), Living Truth with Charles Price, and Love Worth Finding (with the late Adrian Rogers).

== Affiliates ==
- WCKV-LD 22.4 Clarksville, Tennessee
- WOBV 5.1 Starkville, Mississippi
- WJGN-CD 38.1 Chesapeake, Virginia
- KHWB-LD 38.1 Eugene, Oregon
- WSOT-LD 27.1 Marion, Indiana
