= WPSJ-CD =

Television station in Hammonton, New Jersey

- Hammonton, New Jersey; Philadelphia, Pennsylvania; United States
- City: Hammonton, New Jersey
- Channels: Digital: 27 (UHF); Virtual: 8

Programming
- Affiliations: see § Subchannels

Ownership
- Owner: Innovate Corp.; (HC2 Station Group, Inc.)
- Sister stations: WZPA-LD, W25FG-D, WDUM-LD

History
- Founded: June 14, 1985
- First air date: June 14, 1986
- Former call signs: W08CC (1985–1996); WPSJ-LP (1996–2007); WPSJ-LD (2007–2012)
- Former channel numbers: Analog: 8 (VHF, 1986–2006), 24 (UHF, 2006–2007); Digital: 51 (UHF, 2006–2012), 38 (UHF, 2012–2019)
- Call sign meaning: "Philadelphia and South Jersey"

Technical information
- Licensing authority: FCC
- Facility ID: 167543
- Class: CD
- ERP: 8.5 kW
- HAAT: 156 m (512 ft)
- Transmitter coordinates: 40°2′19.7″N 75°14′12.8″W

Links
- Public license information: Public file; LMS

WPSJ-CD (channel 8) is a low-power, Class A television station licensed to Hammonton, New Jersey, United States, serving the Philadelphia area. The station is owned by Innovate Corp., with a transmitter located at the Roxborough antenna farm in northwest Philadelphia.

Founded as W08CC in 1986 by Paul Engle, the station is one of the oldest low-power TV stations in New Jersey. For 25 years, it provided a mix of local interest and syndicated programs. After being sold in 2012, it has primarily carried Spanish-language broadcast networks, including MundoFox/MundoMax and Azteca América.

== History ==
=== Engle ownership ===
WPSJ signed on the air June 14, 1986, as W08CC (sometimes rendered "WOCC-TV"), the first low-power TV station in New Jersey. W08CC was built by Paul Engle, who owned South Jersey Television, Inc., alongside his wife Sandra. Engle won the station by buying out eight competing applicants; the original format included local talk shows and sports programming. The station continued to offer such local programming through the 1990s, even as local cable systems shut it out of their lineups. However, in 1992, it was added to the primary cable system in Vineland; at that time, it debuted a simulcast of the morning show of local radio station WBSS and a show on Vineland issues.

At the station's height in 2005, it took in $400,000 in ad revenue and a percentage of sales on the Shop At Home Network, which it aired in overnight time slots. Then, in 2006, income dropped to more than half after the FCC moved WPSJ from channel 8 to a weaker channel 24. This move reduced its potential viewership from 3.5 million to just 150,000. Engle considered shuttering the station, but he opted to persist. The bet paid off in 2007 when the FCC granted WPSJ the right to use virtual channel 8 and build a digital signal. Engle made an investment of $150,000 to convert to digital transmission, and the station's potential audience grew to almost six million viewers.

=== Sale to Prime Time Partners ===
On December 19, 2012, Engle Broadcasting of Cedar Brook, New Jersey, sold WPSJ-CD to WPSJ-CD Station, LLC, a subsidiary of Doral, Florida–based Prime Time Partners. Earlier that year, an asset purchase agreement had been signed, as had a time brokerage agreement effective August 1. Two weeks later, the station changed programming to the new MundoFox Spanish-language network; Prime Time also owned stations in Boston and Tampa that converted to the service.

Meanwhile, in June 2013, WPSJ relocated from channel 51 to channel 38 as part of a 2012 settlement with WPHA-CD, which moved from channel 38 to 24.

MundoFox, which had changed its name to MundoMax after Fox withdrew from the venture, closed on December 1, 2016. By then, WPSJ-CD was airing a series of other national digital multicast television networks on its subchannels.

=== HC2 ownership ===
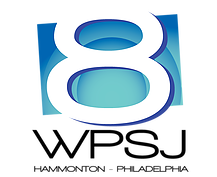
Former logo of WPSJ-CD

Prime Time Partners sold WPSJ-CD for $1.7 million to HC2 Holdings in 2018. The station was an affiliate of HC2-owned Azteca América until that service closed on December 31, 2022.

== Subchannels ==
The station's signal is multiplexed:

Subchannels of WPSJ-CD
Subchannel	Res.	Short name	Programming
8.1	480i	WPSJ-CD	Infomercials (4:3)
8.2	480i	WPSJ-CD	LATV
8.3	480i	WPSJ-CD	America's Voice Español
8.4	480i	WPSJ-CD	Defy
8.5	480i	WPSJ-CD	Newsmax2
8.6	480i	WPSJ-CD	Infomercials (4:3)
8.7	480i	WPSJ-CD	Infomercials (4:3)
