= KVSN-DT =

Television station in Pueblo, Colorado

Semi-satellite of KCEC, Boulder, Colorado
- Pueblo–Colorado Springs, Colorado; United States
- City: Pueblo, Colorado
- Channels: Digital: 27 (UHF); Virtual: 48
- Branding: Univision Colorado; Noticias Univision Colorado (newscasts)

Programming
- Affiliations: 48.1: Univision; 48.2: UniMás; for others, see § Subchannels

Ownership
- Owner: Entravision Communications; (Entravision Holdings, LLC)
- Sister stations: KGHB-CD

History
- Founded: April 10, 2007
- First air date: March 2, 2009
- Former channel numbers: Digital: 48 (UHF, 2009–2019)
- Call sign meaning: Univision

Technical information
- Licensing authority: FCC
- Facility ID: 166331
- ERP: 232 kW
- HAAT: 695 m (2,280 ft)
- Transmitter coordinates: 38°44′41.9″N 104°51′39.4″W

Links
- Public license information: Public file; LMS
- Website: noticiascoloradosprings.com

KVSN-DT (channel 48) is a television station licensed to Pueblo, Colorado, United States, serving the Colorado Springs area as an affiliate of the Spanish-language network Univision. It is owned by Entravision Communications alongside low-power, Class A UniMás affiliate KGHB-CD (channel 27, also licensed to Pueblo). KVSN's transmitter is located on Cheyenne Mountain.

Although identifying as a separate station in its own right, KVSN is considered a semi-satellite of Boulder-licensed KCEC (channel 14), which is owned by TelevisaUnivision but operated by Entravision under a local marketing agreement (LMA). As such, it simulcasts all Univision programming as provided through KCEC, and the two stations share a website. However, KVSN airs separate commercial inserts and legal identifications. Local newscasts, produced by KCEC and branded as Noticias Univision Colorado, are simulcast on both stations. Aside from the transmitter, KVSN does not maintain any facilities in Pueblo or Colorado Springs. Master control and internal operations are based at KCEC's studios on Mile High Stadium West Circle in Denver.

== History ==
KVSN's logo from March 2, 2009, through December 31, 2012

On April 10, 2007, the Federal Communications Commission (FCC) granted a three-year construction permit to Entravision to build a new analog television station to serve the Pueblo–Colorado Springs market on channel 48. It was given the call sign KVSN. Shortly after the permit was granted, Entravision opted to build KVSN as a digital-only station and filed an application in April 2008. KVSN commenced operations under automatic Program Test Authority on March 2, 2009, replacing Class A LPTV station KGHB-CA. Its license was granted on June 5, 2009.

== Technical information ==
=== Subchannels ===
The station's signal is multiplexed:

Subchannels of KVSN-DT
Subchannel	Res.	Short name	Programming
48.1	1080i	KVSN-DT	Univision
48.2	480i	UniMAS	UniMás (KGHB-CD)
48.3	480i	LATV	LATV
48.5	480i	TruCrme	True Crime Network
48.88	1080i	AltaVsn	AltaVision

Simulcast of subchannels of another station
Subchannel broadcast with MPEG-4 video
