= News Channel Nebraska =

Network of television and radio stations in Nebraska, United States

- Statewide Nebraska/Sioux City, Iowa; United States
- City: Norfolk, Nebraska
- Branding: NCN

Programming
- Subchannels: see § Subchannels

Ownership
- Owner: Flood Communications (Mike Flood); (see § Network stations)

History
- Founded: 2002
- First air date: June 2015 (Statewide network launch) including Siouxland

Links
- Website: News Channel Nebraska

News Channel Nebraska (NCN) is an independent, in-state network of commercial radio and television stations in the U.S. state of Nebraska and Sioux City, Iowa. It is operated by Flood Communications, which was founded by attorney, businessman and Congressman Mike Flood. The television stations are all members of the NCN network.

== History ==
News Channel Nebraska was founded in 2015 at Norfolk, Nebraska. In 2017, Flood Communications announced the addition of Spanish-language network Telemundo, also called Telemundo Nebraska.

In addition to commercial advertising, NCN holds pledge drives and solicits donations in the same manner as non-commercial broadcasters.

== Programming ==
News Channel Nebraska primarily focuses on rolling news coverage similar to the original CNN Headline News and the later NewsNet, whose founder and original owner helped establish the format on the News Channel Nebraska stations. Newscasts air every hour and focus primarily on rural Nebraska stories with some coverage of the two major cities, Lincoln and Omaha, and weather forecasts every 10 minutes including former WTNH meteorologist Geoff Fox broadcasting from his home studio in Irvine, California. The network also includes extensive coverage of high school and small college sports with two broadcast trucks covering rural football and basketball games. There is a "north" and "south" feed which show different sports programs, with the other feed's game rebroadcast on delay. High school sports programming requires a subscription when viewed online. In order to avoid conflicts of interest, articles and news coverage involving Flood are written by the Associated Press or Gray Television affiliates in Nebraska.

In March 2020, NCN launched Quarantine Tonight, a show featuring live music from local musicians originally produced as a service to viewers during the COVID-19 pandemic that proved popular enough to continue well past its original planned ending date. Flood was the host of Quarantine Tonight until he began his run for Congress, since then the program has been hosted by former News Channel Nebraska reporter Austen Hagood.

NCN carries some limited syndicated lifestyle programming on weekend mornings, including AgPhD, Ron Hazelton's HouseCalls and P. Allen Smith Garden Style.

== Network stations ==
NCN consists of seven low-power TV stations that make up the network, all stations have callsigns beginning with a "K", as licensed by the Federal Communications Commission (FCC). Combined, they reach almost all of eastern and central Nebraska, as well as parts of Siouxland.

Station	City of license	Channel	Facility ID	ERP	HAAT	Transmitter coordinates	Licensee	First air date	Call letters' meaning	Public license information
KBWF-LD	Sioux City, Iowa	15	181673	15 kW	115.9 m (380 ft)	42°28′21″N 96°25′21″W	Flood Communications of Omaha, LLC	2016	Blake William Flood, Mike Flood's youngest son	LMS
KFDY-LD	Lincoln	27	67012	3.65 kW	173.4 m (569 ft)	40°43′39.7″N 96°36′50.9″W	Flood Communications of Omaha, LLC	2017	"Floody", the nickname of Mike Flood's oldest son, Brenden Flood	LMS
KMJF-LD	Columbus	48	185295	12 kW	82.4 m (270 ft)	41°27′9.3″N 97°15′10.8″W	Flood Communications, L.L.C.	2015	Michael John Flood	LMS
KMLF-LD	Grand Island	21	188582	15 kW	45 m (148 ft); 163.5 m (536 ft) (CP)	40°48′57″N 98°46′19″W	Flood Communications Tri-Cities, L.L.C.	2017	Mandi Lynn Flood, Mike Flood's wife	LMS
KNEN-LD	Norfolk	35	185612	15 kW	166 m (545 ft)	42°1′41″N 97°20′26″W	Flood Communications, L.L.C.	2015	"North East Nebraska"	LMS
KOHA-LD	Omaha	27	33144	15 kW	154.7 m (508 ft)	41°13′29.6″N 95°57′11.6″W	Flood Communications of Omaha, LLC	2018	"Omaha"	LMS
KWBE-LD	Beatrice	21	184308	15 kW	98.3 m (323 ft)	40°15′49″N 96°46′28″W	Flood Communications of Beatrice, LLC	2016	"Beatrice"; shared with KWBE	LMS

== Technical information ==
=== Subchannels ===
The signals of the NCN stations are multiplexed:

Subchannels of KBWF-LD
Channel	Res.	Aspect	Short name	Programming
15.1	720p	16:9	NCN-N	NCN
15.2	720p	16:9	TLMONEB	Telemundo

Subchannels of KFDY-LD
Channel	Res.	Aspect	Short name	Programming
27.1	1080i	16:9	TELM NE	Telemundo
27.2	720p	16:9	NCN-S	NCN

Subchannels of KMJF-LD, KMLF-LD and KWBE-LD
Channel	Res.	Aspect	Short name	Programming
21.1	720p	16:9	TELM NE	Telemundo
21.2	720p	16:9	NCN-S	NCN
21.3	480i	4:3	NCN-N	NCN SD simulcast

Subchannels of KNEN-LD
Channel	Res.	Aspect	Short name	Programming
35.1	720p	16:9	NCN NOR	NCN
35.3	720p	16:9	TelmdNE	Telemundo
9.1	480i	4:3	KCAU-TV	ABC (KCAU-TV)

Subchannels of KOHA-LD
Channel	Res.	Aspect	Short name	Programming
27.1	720p	16:9	TelemNE	Telemundo
27.2	480i	16:9	NCN	NCN
27.3	480i	16:9	DayStar	Daystar
27.4	Audio only		KBBX-FM	KBBX-FM simulcast
