= KMBY-LD =

Television station in Monterey, California

- Monterey, California; United States
- Channels: Digital: 27 (UHF); Virtual: 27
- Branding: MeTV Monterey

Programming
- Affiliations: 27.1: MeTV; for others, see § Subchannels

Ownership
- Owner: Cocola Broadcasting; (Monterey Bay Television LLC)

History
- First air date: 1989
- Former call signs: K53DT (1989–2005); K27IE (2005–2007); KYMB-LP (2007–2009); KYMB-LD (2009–2023)
- Former channel numbers: Analog: 53 (UHF, 1989–2005); 27 (UHF, 2005–2009)
- Former affiliations: TBN (1990–2007)
- Call sign meaning: Variant of former KYMB-LD callsigns, which stood for Your Monterey Bay

Technical information
- Licensing authority: FCC
- Facility ID: 68025
- Class: LD
- ERP: 15 kW
- HAAT: 694.4 m (2,278 ft)
- Transmitter coordinates: 36°32′17.8″N 121°37′34.7″W

Links
- Public license information: LMS
- Website: www.kmbytv.com

KMBY-LD (channel 27) is a low-power television station licensed to Monterey, California, United States, affiliated with MeTV. The station is owned by Cocola Broadcasting. Comcast Xfinity carries KMBY-DT1 on channel 19 in the Monterey Bay Area and Santa Cruz County.

== History ==
Signing on as K53DT, the station was owned by the Trinity Broadcasting Network and broadcast programming from TBN for many years on channel 53. With the FCC's move to reassign UHF channels 52 to 69 to other services, K53DT moved to channel 27 in 2005 and took on the call sign of K27IE.

In 2007, TBN sold the station to Cocola Broadcasting Companies LLC, which then renamed the station KYMB-LP, and then KYMB-LD. In April 2010, Cocola Broadcasting Companies moved the license to Monterey Bay Television LLC, which is now the license holder of KMBY-LD.

On April 26, 2006, the station received a construction permit to flash-cut operations to digital television. On March 8, 2009, KYMB-LD began broadcasting in digital with an effective radiated power of 5 kilowatts.

In 2011, KYMB-LD became an affiliate of the MeTV network.

The station changed its call sign to KMBY-LD on July 20, 2023.

== Technical information ==
=== Subchannels ===
The station's signal is multiplexed:

Subchannels of KMBY-LD
Channel	Res.	Short name	Programming
27.1	480i	MeTV	MeTV
27.2	480i	Heros	Heroes & Icons
27.3	480i	GeTV	Great (4:3)
27.4	480i	Buzzr	Buzzr
27.5	480i	Toons	MeTV Toons
27.6	480i	Daystar	Daystar
27.7	480i	DayStar	Daystar Español
27.8	480i	TeleX	TeleXitos
27.9	480i	SBN	SonLife
27.10	720p	KMBY	Independent
