= KOHA-LD =

Television station in Omaha, Nebraska

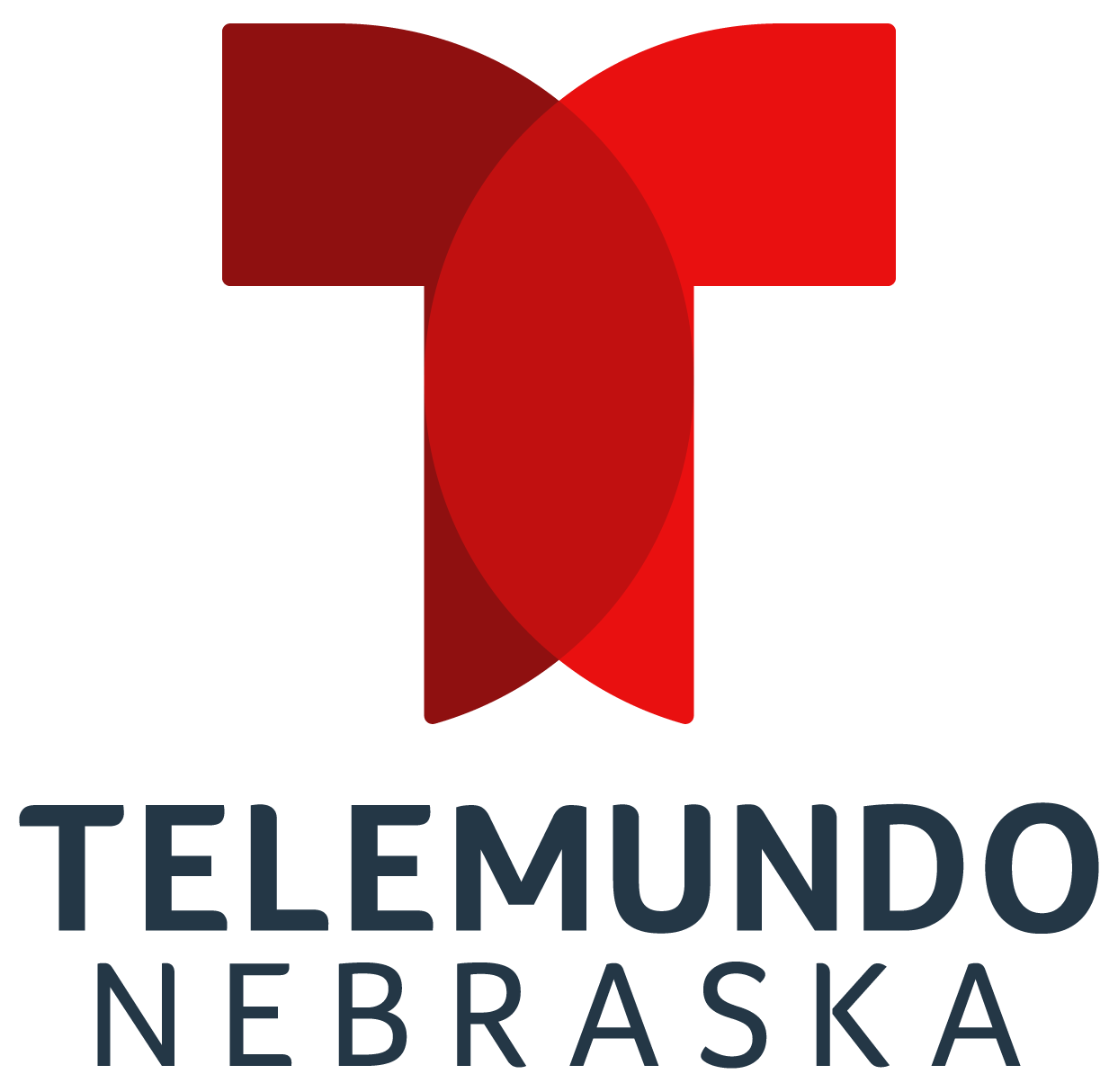
- Omaha, Nebraska; United States
- Channels: Digital: 30 (UHF); Virtual: 27
- Branding: Telemundo Nebraska; News Channel Nebraska (on LD2)

Programming
- Affiliations: 27.1: Telemundo; 27.2: NCN; for others, see § Subchannels

Ownership
- Owner: Flood Communications, LLC (Mike Flood)

History
- First air date: August 3, 1992
- Former call signs: K65FL (1992–1995); KHOA-LP (1995–1996); KOHA-LP (1996–2012)
- Former channel numbers: Analog: 65 (UHF, until 2006), 48 (UHF, 2007–2015); Digital: 48 (UHF, 2015–2018), 27 (UHF, 2018–2024)
- Former affiliations: HSN (until 2006); Dark (2007–2009); Daystar (2009–2018)
- Call sign meaning: "Omaha"

Technical information
- Licensing authority: FCC
- Facility ID: 33144
- Class: LD
- ERP: 15 kW
- HAAT: 154.7 m (508 ft)
- Transmitter coordinates: 41°13′29.6″N 95°57′11.6″W
- Translator(s): KFDY-LD 27 Lincoln

Links
- Public license information: LMS
- Website: Telemundo Nebraska; News Channel Nebraska

KOHA-LD (channel 27), branded as Telemundo Nebraska, is a low-power television station in Omaha, Nebraska, United States, affiliated with the Spanish-language network Telemundo. The station is owned by Flood Communications, which is controlled by attorney and businessman Mike Flood. KOHA-LD's studios are located on John Galt Boulevard in southwestern Omaha.

== History ==
The station was formerly owned by Cornhusker Television and rebroadcast the Home Shopping Network on channel 65 before going dark in 2006. In 2007, the station returned to the air for a short period on channel 48, with an analog signal displaying a test pattern with the call sign and channel number. After a few months, the station again went dark.

In May 2009, the sale of the station to Word of God Fellowship, which runs the Daystar Television Network, was announced. The sale was completed on October 9, 2009.

A construction permit for digital broadcasting on channel 47 was allowed to expire on July 12, 2010. During this time, the analog signal also remained off the air. In September 2011, Word of God Fellowship filed a new application with the FCC to flash-cut to digital broadcasting on channel 48. This application was approved on October 6, 2011. KOHA-LP returned to the air, transmitting Daystar programming over an analog signal, in November 2011. On July 9, 2012, KOHA-LP began broadcasting a digital signal.

On August 2, 2012, the station changed its call sign to KOHA-LD. As of Spring 2018, the station is owned by Flood Communications and operates as a Telemundo affiliate as Telemundo Nebraska. It is the first Spanish language television affiliate in Omaha since former Azteca América affiliated KAZO-LP (2002–2007) and KXVO-DT2 (2008–2014).

KOHA-LD carries News Channel Nebraska on its second subchannel, and as of August 4, 2018, Daystar on its third subchannel.

In June 2024, the station completed a move from UHF channel 27 to UHF channel 30. The channel change was necessary due to Nebraska Public Media transmitter KUON-TV moving from channel 12 to 27.

== Subchannels ==
The station's signal is multiplexed:

Subchannels of KOHA-LD
Subchannel	Res.	Short name	Programming
27.1	720p	TelemNE	Telemundo
27.2	480i	NCN	News Channel Nebraska (4:3)
27.3	480i	DayStar	Daystar (4:3)
27.4	Audio only	KBBX-FM	KBBX-FM
