= WHVL-LD =

Television station in State College, Pennsylvania

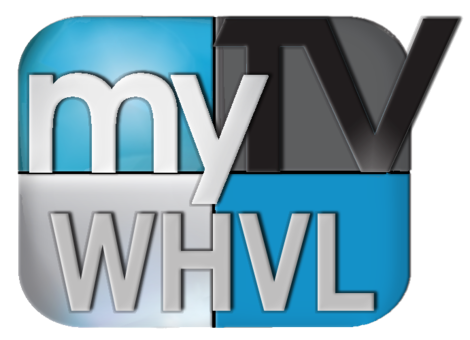
- State College, Pennsylvania; United States
- Channels: Digital: 27 (UHF); Virtual: 29
- Branding: MyTV WHVL

Programming
- Affiliations: 29.1: Independent with MyNetworkTV; 29.2: Buzzr

Ownership
- Owner: Channel Communications; (WHVL-TV, L.L.C.)

History
- Founded: February 28, 1989
- First air date: 2006
- Former call signs: W29AR (1989–2002); WHVL-LP (2002–2019)
- Call sign meaning: Happy Valley

Technical information
- Licensing authority: FCC
- Facility ID: 168799
- Class: LD
- ERP: 15 kW
- HAAT: 353.3 m (1,159 ft)
- Transmitter coordinates: 40°55′10″N 77°58′27″W

Links
- Public license information: LMS
- Website: www.whvl.com

WHVL-LD (channel 29) is a low-power independent television station in State College, Pennsylvania, United States, which has a secondary affiliation with MyNetworkTV. Owned by Channel Communications, the station has studios on East College Avenue near the Nittany Mall, and its transmitter is located atop Rattlesnake Mountain in Rush Township. WHVL-LD is available on cable throughout the Johnstown–Altoona–State College market.

== Programming ==
=== Local programming ===
WHVL was launched on August 31, 2007, with live coverage of the Penn State "Football Eve" pep rally.

With its commitment to local issues and events, WHVL broadcasts many locally produced programs including:

- The Centre of It All – (the name refers to Centre County, where the station is based)
- WHVL High School Game of the Week – covering local high school football
- BlueWhite Tailgate – covering Penn State football with pre- and post-game coverage. Formerly Penn State Tailgate Show

The station occasionally presents special programs covering topics of local interest. On October 16, 2008, WHVL broadcast a live debate featuring 5th Congressional District candidates. It broadcast the Penn State vs. Lock Haven wrestling match on February 23, 2008.

The station broadcasts local programming produced by others including Pit Pass with co-hosts Ron Fox and Jan Miller, a show covering auto racing in Pennsylvania.

== Subchannels ==
The station's signal is multiplexed:

Subchannels of WHVL-LD
Channel	Res.	Short name	Programming
29.1	720p	WHVL-HD	MyNetworkTV
29.2	480i	BUZZR	Buzzr (4:3)
