= KNTS-LP =

Television station in Natchitoches, Louisiana

- Natchitoches, Louisiana; United States
- Channels: Digital: 19 (UHF); Virtual: 17

Ownership
- Owner: Sanphyl Broadcast Network, LLC

History
- First air date: June 21, 1998
- Last air date: February 15, 2021 (license canceled)
- Former channel numbers: Analog: 17 (UHF, 1998–2012)
- Former affiliations: America One, FamilyNet, AMGTV
- Call sign meaning: "Natchitoches"

Technical information
- Licensing authority: FCC
- Facility ID: 56189
- Class: CD
- ERP: 15 kW
- Transmitter coordinates: 31°44′20″N 93°8′1″W

Links
- Public license information: LMS

Digital translator
- KNYS-LD
- Natchitoches, Louisiana; United States
- Channels: Digital: 27 (UHF); Virtual: 27

Technical information
- Facility ID: 40584

KNTS-LP (channel 17) was a low-power television station in Natchitoches, Louisiana, United States.

In 1998, CP-Tel Network Services, a local Internet services provider, acquired a former Italian restaurant to convert it into studios for the station. KNTS-LP went on the air in June and was affiliated with America One and FamilyNet; the studios were completed later, at which time the station was added to local cable systems. Weekday newscasts, originally at 6 p.m. and eventually also at 10 p.m., were added beginning in March 1999; the station also produced shows covering Northwestern State University and high school sports.

KNTS-LP ceased local operations and news production on March 31, 2001. CP-Tel president Richard Gill cited insufficient advertising revenue, rising costs, and the failure to secure a network affiliation. The station was then sold to Sanphyl Broadcast Network; it continued to air local sports and church services. It moved from channel 17 to channel 19 in 2012.

Despite its broadcast in analog, KNTS-LP had a digital translator, KNYS-LD (channel 27). Sanphyl Broadcast Network surrendered the licenses for KNTS-LP and KNYS-LD to the Federal Communications Commission on February 15, 2021; the FCC canceled both licenses the same day.
