= God's Learning Channel =

Christian television network

- West Texas and Eastern New Mexico; United States
- Channels: Virtual: 42, 17, 18, 16, 27

Programming
- Affiliations: Religious Independent

Ownership
- Owner: Prime Time Christian Broadcasting, Inc.

Links
- Website: www.glc.us.com
- For technical information, see § Stations.

God's Learning Channel (GLC) is an American religious television network based in Odessa, Texas, which teaches a biblical point of view of Messianic Judaism. The network was founded in 1982 by Al and Tommie Cooper, who had the vision to share the teachings of Jesus Christ with Southeastern New Mexico. The network later grew to five television transmitters located in New Mexico and West Texas. While the focus of programming has been to teach believers their ties to the Bible and the spiritual world, it has expanded to cover a wide range of themes related to the Land of Israel and the Jewish people, presenting Jesus, in Hebrew pronounced Yeshua, as the Jewish Messiah.

GLC provides 24-hour streaming media of its broadcast (accessible through the GLC website), as well as internet platforms, such as Roku.

== History ==
On January 30, 1985, the Federal Communications Commission granted a construction permit for a new television station on channel 27 in Roswell, New Mexico, to Prime Time Christian Broadcasting. PTCB, at the time carrying programming from the Trinity Broadcasting Network, had already been broadcasting over the local cable system on channel 12. Channel 27 began broadcasting September 15, 1986, and over the years that followed, Prime Time built additional translators and full-service stations, the first of which was constructed at Artesia. Additionally, new studios were built in Roswell in 1987.

It made its first full-power station purchase of KMLM in Odessa, Texas, in 1991, planning began to move the Prime Time headquarters there.

== Stations ==
Station	City of license; (other cities served)	Channel; RF / VC	First air date	Former callsigns	Former channel numbers	ERP	HAAT	Facility ID	Transmitter coordinates	Public license information
KMLM-DT; (flagship station)	Odessa, TX; (Midland, TX)	15 (UHF); 42	October 18, 1988 (Note: The Broadcasting and Cable Yearbook says October 18, while the Television and Cable Factbook says October 17.)	KMLM-TV (1988–2010)	Analog: 42 (UHF, 1988–2009); Digital: 42 (UHF, 2009–2018)	27.9 kW	145 m (476 ft)	53541	32°2′54.6″N 102°18′5.6″W	Public file; LMS
KPCB-DT	Snyder, TX; (Abilene, TX)	17 (UHF); 17	March 24, 1997	KPCB (1997–2010)	Analog: 17 (UHF, 1997–2009)	5 kW	135 m (443 ft)	77452	32°46′52″N 100°53′53″W	Public file; LMS
KPTF-DT	Farwell, TX; (Clovis, NM)	18 (UHF); 18	April 2001	KPTF-TV (2001–2010)	Analog: 18 (UHF, 2001–2009)	50 kW	112 m (367 ft)	81445	34°26′24.4″N 103°12′32.1″W	Public file; LMS
KPTB-DT	Lubbock, TX	16 (UHF); 16	April 28, 1995	KPTB-TV (1995–2010)	Analog: 16 (UHF, 1995–2009)	50 kW	83 m (272 ft)	53544	33°33′12″N 101°49′15″W	Public file; LMS
KRPV-DT	Roswell, NM; (Carlsbad, NM)	27 (UHF); 27	September 15, 1986	KRPV (1986–2010)	Analog: 27 (UHF, 1986–2009); Digital: 28 (UHF, until 2009)	50 kW	122 m (400 ft)	53539	33°23′49.8″N 104°22′34.4″W	Public file; LMS

=== Former repeaters ===
GLC programming was formerly relayed on the following translator stations:

- Abilene, TX – KPTA-LP 63 (translated KMLM)
- Alamogordo, NM – KAPT-LP 29 (translated KRPV)
- Fort Stockton, TX – K25GO (translated KMLM)
- Las Cruces, NM/El Paso, TX – KLCP-LP 30 (translated KRPV)
- McCamey, TX – K50ED (translated KMLM)
- Monahans, TX – KPDN-LP 27 (translated KMLM)
- Pecos, TX – K64EC (translated KMLM)
- Ruidoso, NM – KGDR-LP 47 (translated KRPV)
- Welch, TX – KWGD-LP 54 (translated KMLM)

== Satellites ==
- Galaxy 25 Ku-Band
