= WSOT-LD =

- Marion, Indiana; United States
- Channels: Digital: 27 (UHF); Virtual: 27
- Branding: WSOT-TV

Programming
- Affiliations: NRB TV

Ownership
- Owner: Sunnycrest Baptist Church

History
- First air date: December 23, 1990
- Former call signs: W25BN (1990–1995); WSOT-LP (1995–2012)
- Former channel numbers: Analog: 25 (UHF, 1990–2000); 57 (UHF, 2000–2011)
- Call sign meaning: Sunnycrest Outreach Television

Technical information
- Licensing authority: FCC
- Facility ID: 63934
- Class: LD
- ERP: 10 kW
- HAAT: 163.9 m (538 ft)
- Transmitter coordinates: 40°39′18.1″N 85°37′22.9″W

Links
- Public license information: LMS

WSOT-LD (channel 27) is a low-power religious television station in Marion, Indiana, United States. The station is owned by Sunnycrest Baptist Church.

== History ==
The station began operations on December 23, 1990, as W25BN on channel 25. Five years later, the station changed its call sign to WSOT-LP and was added to more local cable systems. The station moved in 2000 to channel 57 after channel 25 was granted to WRTV-DT in Indianapolis. By 2004, it aired local programming including Sunnycrest church services, local high school sports, and a public affairs program. The station converted to digital broadcasting on channel 27 in 2011.

== Subchannel ==
Subchannel of WSOT-LD
Channel	Res.	Short name	Programming
27.1	480i	WSOT-LD	NRB TV (4:3)
