= WILC-CD =

Television station in Sugar Grove, Illinois

- Sugar Grove–Chicago, Illinois; United States
- City: Sugar Grove, Illinois
- Channels: Digital: 27 (UHF); Virtual: 8

Programming
- Affiliations: 8.1: Daystar; 8.2: Daystar Español; 8.3: Daystar Reflections

Ownership
- Owner: Daystar Television Network; (Word of God Fellowship, Inc.)
- Sister stations: WDCI-LD

History
- Former call signs: W54BE (1989–2008); W40CN (2008–2011); W40CN-D (2011–2020); W27EB-D (2020–2022)
- Former channel numbers: Analog: 54 (UHF, 1992–2008); 40 (UHF, 2008–2011); Digital: 40 (UHF, 2011–2020)
- Former affiliations: Educational Independent (1989–2012); Commercial independent (2012–2020); Translator of WAOE (MyNetworkTV) (2020–2022); Corner Store TV (2022–2023)

Technical information
- Licensing authority: FCC
- Facility ID: 71111
- Class: CD
- ERP: 15 kW
- HAAT: 381.1 m (1,250 ft)
- Transmitter coordinates: 41°53′56.1″N 87°37′23.2″W

Links
- Public license information: Public file; LMS
- Website: www.daystar.com

WILC-CD (channel 8) is a low-power, Class A religious television station licensed to Sugar Grove, Illinois, United States, serving the Chicago area. The station is owned by the Daystar Television Network. WILC-CD's transmitter is located atop the John Hancock Center.

== History ==
Waubonsee Community College, which serves the Aurora area, launched the station on channel 54 as W54BE. Programming included distance education telecourses from the college and a community bulletin board. The station moved to channel 40 in 2008, with the call sign W40CN. The college marketed the station as primarily on cable: Comcast channel 99 or 17; Mediacom channel 15; or AT&T U-Verse channel 99.

The college was not able to construct a digital facility for the station, citing severe budget problems with Illinois state funding and the local district's real estate tax base as reasons. In April 2012, the college filed to sell W40CN to Local Media TV Holdings.

On November 24, 2020, the station moved to digital channel 27, as W27EB-D. On October 24, 2022, the station changed its call sign to WILC-CD. On April 19, 2023, it was announced that WILC-CD would be sold to Daystar for $4,975,000; the transaction was completed on June 15.

== Subchannels ==
Subchannels of WILC-CD
Subchannel	Res.	Short name	Programming
8.1	1080i	WILC-CD	Daystar
8.2	720p	WILC-ES	Daystar Español
8.3	480i	WILC-SD	Daystar Reflections
