= Channel 40 =

Channel 40 refers to several television stations:

== Canada ==
The following television stations operate on virtual channel 40 in Canada:

- CHOT-DT in Gatineau, Quebec
- CIVK-DT-2 in Percé, Quebec
- CJMT-DT in Toronto, Ontario

== Mexico ==
The following television station operates on virtual channel 40 in Mexico:

- XHTVM-TDT in Mexico City

== See also ==
- Channel 40 virtual TV stations in the United States

For UHF frequencies covering 627.25-631.75 MHz:

- Channel 40 TV stations in Canada
- Channel 40 TV stations in Mexico
- Channel 40 digital TV stations in the United States
- Channel 40 low-power TV stations in the United States
