= SCOLA =

SCOLA may refer to:

- Satellite Communications for Learning
- Sutton College, a school in London formerly known as Sutton College of Learning for Adults
- Second Consortium of Local Authorities - a later development of the CLASP system of prefabricated schools constructed in England in the second half of the 20th century
- Scola Tower, tower in Porto Venere, Italy

== People ==
- Scola (surname)
- Rufus Waller (born 1978), R & B musician who performed under the name Scola
