= KHDF-CD =

Television station in Las Vegas

- Las Vegas, Nevada; United States
- Channels: Digital: 19 (UHF); Virtual: 19

Programming
- Affiliations: see § Subchannels

Ownership
- Owner: Innovate Corp.; (HC2 Station Group, Inc.)

History
- First air date: 1992
- Former call signs: K19CS (1990−1992); KKJK-LP (1997−2002); KHDF-CA (2002−2011)
- Former affiliations: Azteca América (2002–2018, 2020–2022); Heartland (2018−2020); Visión Latina (2022–2025)
- Call sign meaning: From XHDF-TV, the call sign of the flagship of TV Azteca, whose Azteca América aired on the network in the 2000s and 2010s

Technical information
- Licensing authority: FCC
- Facility ID: 66807
- Class: CD
- ERP: 15 kW

Links
- Public license information: Public file; LMS

KHDF-CD (channel 19) is a low-power Class A television station in Las Vegas, Nevada, United States, owned by Innovate Corp. Its studios are located at Whitney Ranch Drive in Henderson, and its transmitter is located at Black Mountain.

== History ==
Azteca América Las Vegas logo used until 2011

KHDF-CD began with an original construction permit issued on June 15, 1990, to "Hey Buddy" ... Broadcasting Company. The station was to be built on UHF channel 19 and was assigned the call sign K19CS, though it went by "KNLV". Charles K. "Harry" Tootle began broadcasting from the station in March 1992. Programming mostly consisted of locally produced talk shows (some simulcast from radio station KLAV); programs from NASA TV, which Tootle claimed K19CS was the only broadcast station anywhere to carry; and local public access programs. One program was a call-in show hosted by Tootle; Ken White, television columnist for the Las Vegas Review-Journal, called him "a way-out kind of guy, a nice, well-intentioned man who will put on anyone with something to say, even the wacky fringe elements".

Thomas C. Griner purchased the station and gave it call letters KKJK-LP in November 1997. When the FCC released its initial digital channel allocations on April 21, 1997, it had assigned KUPN's digital companion channel to UHF channel 20. The allocations met with considerable resistance from low-power broadcasters who would be displaced by the digital channel allocations, and on February 17, 1998, the FCC issued a revised final DTV allocation table. KUPN's original allocation would have displaced KKJK-LP and a co-channel TBN station in Bullhead City, Arizona, so the FCC substituted UHF channel 22.

In May 2000, Griner sold the station to Amanda Orrick Mintz. The station upgraded to a Class A license on December 21, 2001, and changed its call letters to KHDF-CA in July 2002. Una Vez Más Holdings was already controlling the station ahead of acquiring it outright in 2004, programming it with Azteca América and signing an agreement to have the sales staff of Las Vegas Fox affiliate KVVU-TV sell commercials on KHDF. During 2011, the station converted to a digital signal and became KHDF-CD.

Northstar Media acquired Una Vez Más's broadcast properties in 2014. HC2 in turn acquired these properties and Azteca América itself in 2017. The network closed at the end of 2022. In 2023, after Azteca América ceased operations, the station flipped to Visión Latina.

On August 1, 2025, MovieSphere Gold has now been placed as the primary affiliate.

== Subchannels ==
Subchannels of KHDF-CD
Subchannel	Res.	Short name	Programming
19.1	480i	KHDF-CD	MovieSphere Gold
19.2	480i	KHDF-CD	NTD America
19.3	480i	KHDF-CD	ESNE TV
19.4	480i	KHDF-CD	Fubo Sports Network
19.5	480i	KHDF-CD	Salem News Channel
19.6	480i	KHDF-CD	Almavision
