= PBS North Carolina =

PBS member state network in North Carolina

University of North Carolina Center for Public Media
- Type: Non-commercial educational broadcast television network
- Branding: PBS North Carolina
- Country: United States
- Availability: statewide North Carolina
- TV stations: See § Stations
- TV transmitters: 12
- Headquarters: 10 UNC-TV Drive, Research Triangle Park, NC
- Owner: University of North Carolina
- Launch date: January 8, 1955
- Picture format: 480i (SDTV) (1955–2009); 1080i (HDTV) (2009–present)
- Affiliation: PBS
- Former affiliations: NET (1955–1970)
- Official website: www.pbsnc.org

The University of North Carolina Center for Public Media, branded PBS North Carolina or commonly PBS NC, is a public television network serving the state of North Carolina. It is operated by the University of North Carolina system, which holds the licenses for all but one of the thirteen PBS member television stations licensed in the state—WTVI (channel 42) in Charlotte is owned by Central Piedmont Community College. The broadcast signals of the twelve television stations cover almost all of the state, as well as parts of Georgia, South Carolina, Tennessee, and Virginia. The network's operations are located at the Joseph and Kathleen Bryan Communications Center at Research Triangle Park between Raleigh and Durham.

== History ==
WUNC-TV in Chapel Hill, the state network's flagship station, first signed on the air on January 8, 1955, as the second non-commercial educational television station located south of Washington, D.C.—one day after Cheaha, Alabama–licensed WCIQ-TV. Over the next twelve years, four more satellite stations signed on. WUND-TV in Edenton (originally WUNB-TV, licensed to Columbia) was the first of these satellites to debut on September 10, 1965, followed by the launches of WUNE-TV in Linville, WUNF-TV in Asheville, and WUNG-TV in Concord—all on September 11, 1967, and WUNJ-TV in Wilmington on June 4, 1971. This was supplemented with a network of translator stations in the Appalachian Mountains that also allowed the network's programming to reach across the entire state.

Logo under the "UNC-TV" brand, used from 1995 to January 11, 2021; the circular "hurricane" emblem had been used in some capacity since 1978.

Five additional satellites debuted afterward: WUNK-TV in Greenville in May 1972, WUNL-TV in Winston-Salem in February 1973, WUNM-TV in Jacksonville in November 1982, WUNP-TV in Roanoke Rapids in October 1986, and WUNU-TV in Lumberton in September 1996. The state network's youngest station, WUNW in Canton, signed on in July 2010 to replace a translator that had served the area since the 1980s. The state network was branded on-air as North Carolina Public Television from 1979 to the mid-1990s, when it rebranded itself as University of North Carolina Television. It simplified the brand name to UNC-TV later in the 1990s; it had previously used that brand for most of the 1970s. On January 12, 2021, in recognition of PBS' growing online content delivery, the state network rebranded itself as "PBS North Carolina," while continuing to acknowledge its ties to the university system as being "Powered by the UNC System".

== Programming ==
The state network produces many programs of local interest, including the weeknightly public affairs program North Carolina Now, Our State, Carolina Outdoor Journal, Exploring North Carolina, North Carolina Bookwatch with D. G. Martin, and special programs about the state's history and culture. It also produces Growing a Greener World, The Zula Patrol, and Song of the Mountains for national distribution. In addition to PBS and American Public Television programs and local productions, the station also runs programming from the United Kingdom, including "Britcoms" on Saturday evenings and the soap opera EastEnders on Sunday evenings. In the 1990s, UNC-TV introduced "Read-A-Roo," a kangaroo used as the mascot for the network's children's programming. PBS North Carolina airs its own public affairs programming on Sunday mornings.

== Stations ==
PBS North Carolina stations in North Carolina.

PBS NC operates twelve stations that relay its programming across the entire state as well as into portions of Virginia, Tennessee, Georgia, and South Carolina.

Each station's callsign consists of "UN" for the University of North Carolina, followed by a letter assigned sequentially in the order in which it was activated, except for the first station.

Station	City of license (Note: Aside from their transmitters, the network's stations (except WUNC-TV) do not maintain any physical presence in their cities of license.)	Channel; TV (RF)	Facility ID	ERP	HAAT	Transmitter coordinates	First air date	Public license information
WUNC-TV	Chapel Hill	4 (20)	69080	1,000 kW	461.9 m (1,515 ft)	35°51′59″N 79°10′0.5″W	January 8, 1955	Public file; LMS
WUND-TV	Edenton (Note: WUND-TV was originally licensed to Columbia; the license was moved to Edenton in 2005, effectively gaining must-carry rights in the Norfolk–Newport News–Portsmouth television market, which includes several northeastern North Carolina counties.)	2 (29)	69292	657 kW	489.8 m (1,607 ft)	35°54′1″N 76°20′44″W	September 10, 1965 (Note: WUND-TV formerly used the callsign WUNB-TV from its 1965 inception to 1967.)	Public file; LMS
WUNE-TV	Linville	17 (36)	69114	1,000 kW	546.9 m (1,794 ft)	36°3′50″N 81°50′32″W	September 11, 1967 (Note: WUNE-TV formerly used the callsign WUND-TV during its construction permit from 1966 to 1967.)	Public file; LMS
WUNF-TV	Asheville	33 (20)	69300	125 kW	816 m (2,677 ft)	35°25′32″N 82°45′24″W	September 11, 1967 (Note: WUNF-TV formerly used the callsign WVLE during its construction permit from 1966 to 1967.)	Public file; LMS
WUNF-TV	Asheville	33 (20)	69300	1,000 kW	550.7 m (1,807 ft)	35°13′20″N 82°32′58″W	September 11, 1967	Public file; LMS
WUNF-TV	Asheville	33 (20)	69300	1.73 kW	−144.8 m (−475 ft)	35°28′25.4″N 83°19′22.5″W	September 11, 1967	Public file; LMS
WUNG-TV	Concord	58 (21)	69124	260 kW	416.7 m (1,367 ft)	35°21′30.7″N 80°36′36.4″W	September 11, 1967	Public file; LMS
WUNJ-TV	Wilmington	39 (21)	69332	1,000 kW	294.5 m (966 ft)	34°19′17.2″N 78°13′41.4″W	June 4, 1971	Public file; LMS
WUNK-TV	Greenville	25 (25)	69149	1,000 kW	348 m (1,142 ft)	35°33′11″N 77°36′4.8″W	May 7, 1972	Public file; LMS
WUNL-TV	Winston-Salem	26 (33)	69360	1,000 kW	500.2 m (1,641 ft)	36°22′31.7″N 80°22′17.5″W	February 22, 1973	Public file; LMS
WUNM-TV	Jacksonville	19 (28)	69444	700 kW	562.1 m (1,844 ft)	35°6′16″N 77°20′11″W	November 16, 1982	Public file; LMS
WUNP-TV	Roanoke Rapids	36 (27)	69397	248 kW	364 m (1,194 ft)	36°17′29.2″N 77°50′9.4″W	October 16, 1986	Public file; LMS
WUNU	Lumberton	31 (30)	69416	329 kW	317.1 m (1,040 ft)	34°47′51″N 79°2′41″W	September 23, 1996	Public file; LMS
WUNW	Canton	27 (27)	83822	115 kW	504.9 m (1,656 ft)	35°34′7″N 82°54′26.2″W	July 21, 2010	Public file; LMS
WUNW	Canton	27 (27)	83822	0.9 kW	429.2 m (1,408 ft)	35°10′36.4″N 82°40′53.5″W	July 21, 2010	Public file; LMS
WUNW	Canton	27 (27)	83822	0.94 kW	320.7 m (1,052 ft)	36°2′0.4″N 82°12′8.5″W	July 21, 2010	Public file; LMS
WUNW	Canton	27 (27)	83822	0.88 kW	570.2 m (1,871 ft)	35°7′56.7″N 82°59′0.6″W	July 21, 2010	Public file; LMS
WUNW	Canton	27 (27)	83822	0.94 kW	279.5 m (917 ft)	35°24′47″N 83°30′2″W	July 21, 2010	Public file; LMS
WUNW	Canton	27 (27)	83822	0.94 kW	−146 m (−479 ft)	35°18′12.4″N 83°10′39.5″W	July 21, 2010	Public file; LMS

== Technical information ==
=== Subchannels ===
PBS NC's current over-the-air digital configuration, which is multiplexed among three subchannels, was introduced on September 25, 2008. On that date, UNC-TV revised its subchannel lineup on its stations, reducing the number of channels to three: UNC-TV (the main channel of each station, which now carries high definition programming), and the standard definition–only services UNC-KD and UNC-EX ("The Explorer Channel"). UNC-TV HD and UNC-EX are also available to DirecTV customers with MPEG4-compatible receivers. Prior to February 1, 2016, Time Warner Cable customers also received UNC-MX (described as "an eclectic mix of programming for adults") in standard definition; the North Carolina Channel has since replaced UNC-MX on Time Warner Cable systems. Prior to November 1, 2009, the third subchannel was named UNC-NC.

This configuration is used for WUND, WUNF, WUNG, WUNJ, WUNK, and WUNU:

PBS NC multiplex
Subchannel	Res.	Short name	Programming
xx.1	1080i	PBS NC	PBS
xx.2	480i	ROOTLE	PBS Kids
xx.3	480i	UNC-EX	The Explorer Channel
xx.4	480i	NCCHL	The North Carolina Channel

This configuration is used for WUNC and WUNL:

Subchannels of WUNC-TV/WUNL-TV and WRAY-TV/WLXI
License	Subchannel	Res.	Short name	Programming
WUNC-TV/WUNL-TV	4.1/26.1	1080i	PBS NC	PBS
WUNC-TV/WUNL-TV	4.2/26.2	480i	ROOTLE	PBS Kids
WUNC-TV/WUNL-TV	4.3/26.3	480i	UNC-EX	The Explorer Channel
WUNC-TV/WUNL-TV	4.4/26.4	480i	NCCHL	The North Carolina Channel
WRAY-TV/WLXI	30.1/43.1	1080i	WRAY/WLXI	TCT

An alternate configuration is used for WUNE, WUNM, WUNP, and WUNW. The original purpose for this was to obtain must-carry status for UNC-KD since those are secondary stations in their respective markets. On June 15, 2010, UNC-KD switched subchannels with UNC-EX on the four stations previously mentioned, which transferred UNC-KD's must-carry status to UNC-EX.

Subchannels of WUNE, WUNM, WUNP, and WUNW
Subchannel	Res.	Short name	Programming
xx.1	480i	UNC-EX	The Explorer Channel
xx.2	1080i	PBS NC	PBS
xx.3	480i	ROOTLE	PBS Kids
xx.4	480i	NCCHL	The North Carolina Channel

Subscribers of Charter Spectrum, the major cable provider in the state, have direct-fiber optic versions of each of PBS North Carolina's networks rather than an antenna feed of their local station, as Spectrum forerunner company Time Warner Cable built out a direct connection to PBS NC's studios at the RTP, a connection inherited by Spectrum parent Charter Communications when it merged with Time Warner Cable in 2016.

Cable providers with a direct fiber optic link to UNC-TV (including Spectrum) formerly had exclusivity in carrying UNC-MX (formerly UNC-ED) on their digital tiers. UNC-MX featured a mix of how-to and public affairs programs, along with encore presentations of programs originally broadcast on main UNC-TV service. On February 1, 2016, UNC-MX was renamed UNC-NC "The North Carolina Channel" and was added over-the-air on DT4, allowing full access to the service by over-the-air and non-Spectrum viewers. On July 2, 2016, UNC-KD was rebranded as ROOTLE.

Prior to September 25, 2008, UNC-TV formerly operated four digital channels: in addition to the main signal on the primary channel, the second digital subchannel of each station carried UNC-HD (which carried PBS and regional programming in high-definition), the third subchannel carried UNC-KD (which carried children's programs), the fourth subchannel carried UNC-ED (an educational television service) and the fifth subchannel carried UNC-NC (centering on North Carolina public affairs and original local productions). Due to bandwidth limitations at the time, the over-the-air feed of UNC-HD was only available between 8-11 p.m., during which UNC-ED and UNC-NC ceased transmission in the interim. Cable systems with a direct fiber link to UNC-TV facilities aired all five channels on a 24-hour schedule.

On April 16, 2018, WRAY-TV and WLXI were merged onto WUNC's spectrum, after parent company Tri-State Christian Television (TCT) sold the stations' individual bandwidth in the 2016 FCC incentive auction. WUNC is the only station in the 12-station network that has a channel sharing agreement.

=== Analog-to-digital conversion ===
UNC-TV's stations ended regular programming on their analog signals on June 12, 2009, the official date on which full-power television stations in the United States transitioned from analog to digital broadcasts under federal mandate. The station's digital channel allocations pre- and post-transition are as follows:

Call sign	Analog channel	Pre-transition digital channel	Post-transition digital channel	FCC Repack Plan (2017)
WUNC	4	59	25	20
WUND	2	20	20	29
WUNE	17	54	17	36
WUNF	33	25	25	20
WUNG	58	44	44	21
WUNJ	39	29	29	21
WUNK	25	23	23	25
WUNL	26	32	32	33
WUNM	19	18	19	28
WUNP	36	39	36	27
WUNU	31	25	31	30
WUNW	—	—	27	27

All channels retained their original numbering for display to viewers via PSIP.

UNC-TV opted not to join other broadcasters in the Wilmington market in an early switch to digital-only broadcasts on September 8, 2008, nine months ahead of the national transition deadline. Following that date, WUNJ-TV became only full-power station in Wilmington that continued to broadcast an analog signal until the national digital transition on June 12, 2009.

As part of the SAFER Act, WUND and WUNF kept its analog signal on the air until July 12 (for WUND) and June 26 (for WUNF) to inform viewers of the digital television transition through a loop of public service announcements from the National Association of Broadcasters.

=== ATSC 3.0 ===
On March 22, 2021, WUNC-TV began broadcasting in ATSC 3.0, with a 1080p stream (virtual channel 4.11) on Capitol Broadcasting Company's host station WARZ-CD (now WNGT-CD). On June 29, 2021, WUNK-TV was converted to ATSC 3.0 with all sub-channels included. While a simulcast of WUNK-TV is shared on WUNM-TV, areas outside WUNM-TV are covered by other nearby network stations, thus the conversion did not result in any loss of over-the-air PBS service.

== Translators ==
PBS NC operates 19 translators. Each translator is assigned to the license of a parent PBS NC full-power station, all of which simulcast the same network signal. Two directly repeat WUNC-TV, two directly repeat WUNE-TV, two directly repeat WUNG-TV, three directly repeat WUNL-TV, and 10 directly repeat WUNF-TV.

The 17 mountain-based translators serve as low-power, limited-area repeaters that bring the network's signal to towns in deep mountain valleys where the parent signal is blocked by the surrounding terrain. The translators of WUNC-TV act as digital replacement translators serving the few areas of the Triangle where WUNC-TV lost over-the-air coverage during the analog-digital conversion in 2009.

The following digital replacement translators rebroadcast WUNC-TV:

- Raleigh: WUNC-DRT
- Oxford: WUNC-DRT

The following translators rebroadcast WUNE-TV:

- Marion: W22FB-D
- Bat Cave: W29FE-D

The following translators rebroadcast WUNF-TV:

- Franklin (Wine Spring Bald): W19DB-D
- Andrews, etc.: W20EK-D
- Canton, etc.: W28EE-D
- Hayesville: W29DE-D
- Murphy: W31AN-D
- Franklin (Cowee Bald): W31DH-D
- Black Mountain: W33EH-D
- Highlands: W35CK-D
- Burnsville: W35CO-D

The following translators rebroadcast WUNG-TV:

- Tryon: W16DZ-D
- Jefferson: W30EF-D
- Spruce Pine: W31DI-D

The following translators rebroadcast WUNL-TV:

- Sparta: W15EF-D
- Boone: W27EK-D
- Zionville: W30CS-D

The licenses for translators in Bakersville (W42AX-D), Brevard (W19DD-D), Bryson City (W46AX-D), Cashiers (W42DF-D) and Cullowhee (W47DM-D) were surrendered to the Federal Communications Commission and cancelled on October 27, 2021. These were replaced with a distributed transmission system using the channel 27 frequency of WUNW.

== Cable and satellite carriage ==
PBS NC is carried on all cable television providers in North Carolina. In Georgia, Kinetic TV carries WUNF in Blairsville. In South Carolina, Charter Spectrum carries WUNF in Greenville and Spartanburg, and WUNJ in Conway and Myrtle Beach. In Tennessee, Charter Spectrum carries WUNE and SkyBest TV carries WUNL, in Mountain City. In Virginia, WUND is carried by Cox Communications and Xfinity in the southern portion of the Hampton Roads market, WUNL is carried by Chatmoss Cablevision and Xfinity in Danville, and WUNP is carried on Xfinity in South Boston and South Hill.

On AT&T U-verse, DirecTV, and Dish Network, WUNC-TV, WUNG, WUNL, WUNF, WUND, WUNJ, and WUNU are carried on the respective local feeds for the Research Triangle, Charlotte, the Piedmont Triad, Greenville/Spartanburg/Asheville, Hampton Roads, Wilmington, and Florence/Myrtle Beach markets. In previous years, WUNL has also been carried on the Roanoke DirecTV feed; the Piedmont Triad market includes portions of western Virginia.

== See also ==
- North Carolina Public Radio
