= MovieSphere Gold =

American free-to-air movie television network

- Type: Free-to-air television network (movies)
- Country: United States
- Broadcast area: Nationwide, via OTA digital TV (coverage 79.81%)
- Affiliates: List of affiliates
- Headquarters: Santa Monica, California

Programming
- Language: English
- Picture format: 720p HDTV master feed; (downscaled to 480i (SDTV) on most over-the-air affiliates)

Ownership
- Owner: Lionsgate Worldwide Television Distribution Group; Debmar-Mercury; (joint effort)
- Parent: Lionsgate Studios

History
- Launched: August 1, 2025; 15 months ago

Links
- Website: moviespheregold.com

Availability

Streaming media
- Service(s): Frndly TV, Sling Freestream

MovieSphere Gold is an American free-to-air movie television network owned and operated by Lionsgate Worldwide Television Distribution Group and its subsidiary Debmar-Mercury.

Similar to Weigel Broadcasting-owned digital free-to-air movie television network Movies! (though airing more classic films), the network showcases premium films and TV movies ranging from the 1970s to the present day (mostly from Lionsgate's library). To comply with FCC guidelines, the network edits out profanity and obscene scenes on films shown, although the network airs on an off-the-clock schedule except when paid programming is shown everyday at 6 a.m. ET.

== History ==
Around July 2025, Lionsgate Studios–owned FAST channel MovieSphere's Facebook account showed promotions for MovieSphere Gold, an over-the-air television counterpart set to quietly launch on August 1.

In October 2025, the network was added to Frndly TV. The following month, the network was confirmed to be available on DirecTV, Dish Network and Sling Freestream. CBS Media Ventures would also handle the national advertising sales. It was also announced that Nielsen would begin measuring both MovieSphere and MovieSphere Gold.

In December 2025, LTN was selected to add the network on its IP video distribution network.

== Affiliates ==
As of November 2025, MovieSphere Gold is available in over 80% of the United States, with the majority being owned TelevisaUnivision and HC2 Holdings.

List of MovieSphere Gold affiliates
Media market	State/District	Station	Channel
Birmingham	Alabama	WVUA	23.2
Huntsville	Alabama	W34EY-D	38.2
Mobile	Alabama	WPAN	53.4
Montgomery	Alabama	WDSF-LD	19.1
Montgomery	Alabama	WQAP-LD	36.1
Phoenix	Arizona	KTVW-DT	33.7
Tucson	Arizona	KUVE-DT	46.4
Yuma	Arizona	KBFY-LD	41.1
Fayetteville	Arkansas	KFFS-CD	36.2
Fort Smith	Arkansas	KQRY-LD	36.2
Little Rock	Arkansas	KKYK-CD	30.3
Bakersfield	California	KUVI-DT	45.8
Chico	California	KKRM-LD	11.4
Fresno	California	KTFF-DT	61.4
Los Angeles	California	KMEX-DT	34.3
Monterey	California	K09AAF-D	9.5
Palm Springs	California	K21DO-D	21.3
Sacramento	California	KTFK-DT	64.7
San Diego	California	KSKT-CD	43.1
San Francisco	California	KFSF-DT	66.3
San Luis Obispo	California	KSBO-CD	42.2
Santa Barbara	California	KVMM-CD	41.1
Santa Maria	California	KDFS-CD	30.1
Denver	Colorado	KCEC	14.2
Grand Junction	Colorado	KLML	20.7
Hartford	Connecticut	WRNT-LD	32.3
Hartford	Connecticut	WTXX-LD	34.1
Washington	District of Columbia	WRZB-LD	31.3
Fort Myers–Naples	Florida	WXDT-LD	23.4
Fort Myers–Naples	Florida	WZDT-LD	39.2
Gainesville	Florida	WNFT-LD	8.7
Jacksonville	Florida	WKBJ-LD	20.2
Jacksonville	Florida	WODH-LD	34.2
Jacksonville	Florida	WRCZ-LD	35.1
Miami–Fort Lauderdale	Florida	WLTV-DT	23.4
Orlando	Florida	WVEN-TV	43.3
Panama City	Florida	WPFN-CD	22.7
Tallahassee	Florida	WXTL-LD	36.2
Tampa–St. Petersburg	Florida	WVEA-TV	50.2
West Palm Beach	Florida	WPTV-TV	5.8
Atlanta	Georgia	WUVG-DT	34.6
Columbus	Georgia	W31EU-D	29.1
Columbus	Georgia	W29FD-D	43.3
Macon	Georgia	W28EU-D	42.3
Macon	Georgia	WJDO-LD	44.1
Savannah	Georgia	WUET-LD	43.5
Honolulu	Hawaii	KHON-TV	2.4
Boise	Idaho	KKJB	39.3
Pocatello–Idaho Falls	Idaho	KVUI	31.7
Twin Falls	Idaho	KGLW-LD	23.3
Chicago	Illinois	WGBO-DT	66.2
Peoria	Illinois	W27EQ-D	27.6
Springfield–Champaign	Illinois	WCQA-LD	16.5
Springfield–Champaign	Illinois	WEAE-LD	21.6
Springfield–Champaign	Illinois	W23EW-D	41.2
Quincy	Illinois	K14SU-D	14.6
Evansville	Indiana	WDLH-LD	21.1
Evansville	Indiana	WELW-LD	30.1
Fort Wayne	Indiana	WCUH-LD	16.6
Fort Wayne	Indiana	WFWC-CD	45.6
Indianapolis	Indiana	WUDZ-LD	28.3
Indianapolis	Indiana	WSDI-LD	32.1
Indianapolis	Indiana	WQDE-LD	33.1
Cedar Rapids	Iowa	KFKZ-LD	35.4
Davenport	Iowa	K33QA-D	16.2
Topeka	Kansas	K35KX-D	35.1
Wichita	Kansas	KFVT-LD	34.3
Lexington	Kentucky	WBON-LD	9.3
Louisville	Kentucky	WBNA	21.3
Lafayette	Louisiana	K21OM-D	20.4
Lake Charles	Louisiana	KVHP	29.3
Monroe–West Monroe	Louisiana	KMCT-TV	39.7
New Orleans	Louisiana	KGLA-DT	42.3
Shreveport	Louisiana	K27NA-D	42.2
Bangor	Maine	WVII-TV	7.3
Baltimore	Maryland	WMJF-CD	39.2
Salisbury	Maryland	WOWZ-LD	33.5
Boston	Massachusetts	WUNI	66.2
Springfield	Massachusetts	WTXX-LD	34.1
Detroit	Michigan	WDWO-CD	18.4
Detroit	Michigan	WUDL-LD	19.4
Detroit	Michigan	WADL	38.4
Flint–Saginaw–Bay City	Michigan	W35DQ-D	24.1
Grand Rapids	Michigan	WXMI	17.7
Grand Rapids	Michigan	W27ED-D	48.2
Traverse City–Cadillac	Michigan	W36FH-D	36.8
Saint Paul	Minnesota	KMYN-LD	32.3
Minneapolis–Saint Paul	Minnesota	KWJM-LD	15.1
Minneapolis–Saint Paul	Minnesota	KMBD-LD	43.1
Rochester	Minnesota	KXSH-LD	35.3
Rochester	Minnesota	KMQV-LD	49.2
Columbia–Jefferson City	Missouri	K35OY-D	35.6
Joplin	Missouri	K34NJ-D	41.2
Kansas City	Missouri	KAJF-LD	21.1
Kansas City	Missouri	KCMN-LD	42.1
Kansas City	Missouri	KQML-LD	46.1
St. Louis	Missouri	KPTN-LD	7.1
St. Louis	Missouri	W29CI-D	29.2
St. Louis	Missouri	KBGU-LD	33.4
St. Louis	Missouri	WODK-LD	45.2
Billings	Montana	KTVQ	2.7
Missoula	Montana	KPAX-TV	8.7
Kalispell	Montana	KAJJ-CD	18.7
Lincoln	Nebraska	KAJS-LD	33.3
Omaha	Nebraska	KQMK-LD	25.1
Las Vegas	Nevada	KHDF-CD	19.1
Las Vegas	Nevada	K36NE-D	21.2
Las Vegas	Nevada	KNBX-CD	31.1
Reno	Nevada	KCNL-LD	3.4
Albuquerque–Santa Fe	New Mexico	KLUZ-TV	14.8
Albany	New York	WYBN-LD	14.4
Buffalo	New York	WKBW-TV	7.6
Buffalo	New York	WVTT-CD	34.2
New York City	New York	WXTV-DT	41.2
Rochester	New York	WAWW-LD	13.4
Syracuse	New York	WMJQ-CD	40.4
Charlotte	North Carolina	WWJS	14.5
Greensboro	North Carolina	WGSR-LD	19.3
Greenville	North Carolina	W35DW-D	45.1
Wilmington	North Carolina	WQDH-LD	49.3
Fargo	North Dakota	K15MR-D	51.8
Cleveland	Ohio	WQHS-DT	61.8
Columbus	Ohio	WDEM-CD	17.2
Dayton	Ohio	WRCX-LD	40.6
Toledo	Ohio	WMNT-CD	48.7
Oklahoma City	Oklahoma	KTUZ-TV	30.5
Tulsa	Oklahoma	KQCW-DT	19.2
Eugene	Oregon	KORY-CD	15.8
Eugene	Oregon	K06QR-D	41.3
Portland	Oregon	KOXI-CD	20.1
Philadelphia	Pennsylvania	WFPA-CD	28.4
Philadelphia	Pennsylvania	WMCN-TV	44.4
Philadelphia	Pennsylvania	WTVE	51.2
Pittsburgh	Pennsylvania	WOSC-CD	22.2
Pittsburgh	Pennsylvania	WPTG-CD	69.1
Scranton–Wilkes-Barre	Pennsylvania	WRLD-LD	30.10
Providence	Rhode Island	WVMA-CD	17.3
Charleston	South Carolina	WBSE-LD	20.1
Chattanooga	Tennessee	WYHB-CD	39.8
Knoxville	Tennessee	WEZK-LD	28.2
Memphis	Tennessee	WREG-TV	3.4
Memphis	Tennessee	WTME-LD	35.4
Nashville	Tennessee	WCTZ-LD	35.2
Nashville	Tennessee	WKUW-LD	40.1
Amarillo	Texas	KLKW-LD	22.1
Amarillo	Texas	KAUO-LD	15.3
Austin	Texas	KTFO-CD	31.8
Austin	Texas	KAKW-DT	62.8
Beaumont	Texas	KUMJ-LD	23.3
Brownsville	Texas	KNWS-LD	64.1/8
Corpus Christi	Texas	K32OC-D	29.1
Corpus Christi	Texas	KYDF-LD	34.1
El Paso	Texas	KINT-TV	26.5
Dallas–Fort Worth	Texas	KUVN-DT	23.4
Harlingen	Texas	KAZH-LD	57.4
Houston	Texas	KXLN-DT	45.4
Lubbock	Texas	K32OV-D	24.6
Lubbock	Texas	KNKC-LD	29.1
San Antonio	Texas	KNIC-DT	17.3
Tyler	Texas	KDKJ-LD	27.2
Tyler	Texas	KBJE-LD	29.1
Tyler	Texas	KKPD-LD	30.1
Waco	Texas	KXXV	25.7
Waco	Texas	KZCZ-LD	34.2
Waco	Texas	KAXW-LD	35.3
Salt Lake City	Utah	KUTH-DT	32.7
Vernal	Utah	KEMS	16.6
Bristol	Virginia	WLFG	68.9
Chesapeake–Norfolk–Virginia Beach	Virginia	WSKY-TV	4.7
Richmond	Virginia	WWBK-LD	28.3
Richmond	Virginia	WFWG-LD	30.2
Richmond	Virginia	WUDW-LD	53.2
Roanoke–Lynchburg	Virginia	WWCW	21.3
Roanoke–Lynchburg	Virginia	WMDV-LD	23.3
Roanoke–Lynchburg	Virginia	WYAT-LD	40.2
Seattle–Tacoma	Washington	KSTW	11.5
Spokane	Washington	KDYS-LD	32.2
Yakima	Washington	KYPK-LD	32.4
Charleston–Huntington	West Virginia	WOCW-LD	21.1
Eau Claire–La Crosse	Wisconsin	WZEO-LD	26.3
Madison	Wisconsin	WZCK-LD	8.1
Milwaukee–Green Bay	Wisconsin	WIWN	68.2
Rhinelander–Wausau	Wisconsin	WJFW-TV	12.6
