= Walking in the Kingdom =

- Created by: Tom Renfro
- Starring: Tom Renfro
- Country of origin: United States
- No. of seasons: 7
- No. of episodes: 68

Production
- Producers: Tom Renfro, Sid Renfro & Davin Stanley
- Editors: Jeff Newberry & Davin Stanley
- Running time: 30 minutes (approx 18 min)

Original release
- Network: WLFG
- Release: October 13, 2005 – present

Walking in the Kingdom is an American religious TV show produced by Living Faith Television (LFTV) that began broadcasting on WLFG in Grundy, Virginia, on October 13, 2005. The show was created by Tom Renfro, MD and is hosted by him and Sid Renfro. The show is divided into three parts: Christian round table discussions, scripture reading and songs of worship.

At least 40 hours a week are recorded for the show, which are then edited into a 30-minute program. It is taped at the Renfro Manor. The program airs on LFTV and Heritage TV.

== Creator and co-host ==
Dr. Thomas E. Renfro, born February 7, 1955, in Norton, Virginia to Mildred and Ed Renfro, is best known for overcoming his battle with Mantle Cell Lymphoma. He graduated from the University of Virginia, and became a medical doctor. Renfro had one son, Jason, who died in a farming accident. He is married to Sid Renfro.

Renfro has appeared on many religious TV shows, such as The 700 Club giving his testimony. He is an ordained minister.

== Production cast and crew ==
The TV series operates under a small crew.

- Hosts: Dr. Tom Renfro and Sid Renfro
- Director: Dr. Tom Renfro
- Assistant Director: Davin S. Stanley
- Supervising Editor: Jeff Newberry
- Assistant Editor: Davin S. Stanley
- Producers: Dr. Tom and Sid Renfro

Production Company: Living Faith Television
