= WWMW-LD =

Television station in Milwaukee

- Milwaukee, Wisconsin (Note: Originally licensed to Sheboygan, Wisconsin; moved to Milwaukee in 2011.); United States
- Channels: Digital: 9 (VHF); Virtual: 16

Programming
- Affiliations: see § Subchannels

Ownership
- Owner: SagamoreHill Broadcasting; (Roseland Broadcasting, Inc.)
- Sister stations: WMWI-LD

History
- Founded: October 26, 1990
- First air date: 1990
- Former call signs: W20AG (1990–2000); W16BS (2000–2008); W29DJ (2008–2010); WPVS-LP (2010–2022); WPVS-LD (2022–2024)
- Former channel numbers: Analog: 20 (UHF, 1990–2000), 16 (UHF, 2000–2008); Virtual: 9.2 (2022–2023), 29 (2023–2024)
- Former affiliations: TBN (1990–2007)
- Call sign meaning: Wisconsin/Milwaukee

Technical information
- Licensing authority: FCC
- Facility ID: 67976
- Class: LD
- ERP: 3 kW
- HAAT: 229.2 m (752 ft)
- Transmitter coordinates: 43°5′46.2″N 87°54′15″W

Links
- Public license information: LMS

WWMW-LD (channel 16) is a low-power television station in Milwaukee, Wisconsin, United States. The station is owned by SagamoreHill Broadcasting. It had been licensed to Sheboygan until 2011.

== History ==
=== In Sheboygan ===
For seventeen years, the station acted as the local translator station for TBN, launching in March 1990 as W20AG from a site on Sheboygan's south side along Weeden Creek Road (County Trunk Highway EE), in an industrial park just west of a WisDOT emissions testing station on land leased from Lakeshore Technical College, which broadcast telecourses and programming from SCOLA on W08BW (channel 8) until the early 2000s. In its first year of operation, TBN was forced by FCC action to station a broadcast engineer in Sheboygan to take calls regarding adjacent-channel interference, and to retune its transmitter to reduce it which affected the reception of the Milwaukee market's two major UHF commercial stations (by coincidence, both on the other sides of W20AG's spectrum), WVTV on channel 18, and WCGV-TV on channel 24, especially on Sheboygan's west side along the Interstate 43 corridor. The interference was so severe, that Star Cablevision, the major cable provider for the area (now part of Spectrum), was forced to adjust its reception antenna with a band-stop filter to filter out the 506 MHz frequency of W20AG, with local television shops and Memorial Mall's Radio Shack also making consumer filters available. Star and its successor companies were not required to carry translator stations, even locally originated, and never cleared W20AG on its programming lineup, nor TBN's satellite feed.

In the summer of 2000, the station moved to channel 16 as W16BS due to channel reassignments ahead of the 2009 digital television transition, continuing to transmit the TBN schedule without local deviation.

Several factors influenced the sale of the station, including a declining audience via antenna for TBN's translator stations, and the signals of religious stations WTLJ (channel 54) and WLLA (channel 64) from Western Michigan being easily receivable during the summer months in the Sheboygan area.

The launch by TBN of WWRS (channel 52) from Mayville did not affect W16BS as that station's signal was blocked by the Kettle Moraine range east of Fond du Lac, blocking any signal from entering Sheboygan and leaving TBN to continue to operate W16BS. TBN would finally acquire coverage through Charter Communications in late August 2007 via satellite. Time Warner Cable systems in the county also carried the network via WWRS via must-carry election. These carriage agreements, associated costs of the digital transition, and universal coverage by the major satellite broadcasters were likely the impetus for TBN's sale of the station to another party.

The station was taken silent after TBN sold the station to Sarasota, Florida–based Sheboygan Community Broadcasting, LLC in August 2007, which was likely a holding company designed solely to profit from a sale of the station's license without a commitment to broadcast (notably, the FCC application misspelled the city of license in the above LLC as "Sheboygen").

FCC records indicate that the station returned to the air on channel 29 as W29DJ on March 6, 2008, but from a different transmitter located south of Random Lake east of Highway 57, which had no Sheboygan coverage and served a small scattering of communities in southeast Sheboygan County and northeast Ozaukee County. Service from Random Lake was intermittent, as SCB's transmitter equipment was leased from another party and seized several times for non-payment before the sale to Polnet. As of May 2011 the station's FCC coverage maps showed its broadcast range was an area of 4 square miles (10 km^{2}) southeast of Random Lake only covering several farms to maintain service and the license.

A return to Sheboygan became unlikely around July 2008, when the tower, transmitter, and TBN's satellite equipment was removed from the Weeden Creek Road site after LTC ended their lease with the city of Sheboygan for the land within the industrial park, leaving only the transmitter shed remaining for storage; it was eventually sold off for new development to a local commercial bakery.

The station previously covered the eastern part of Sheboygan County, with the original footprint of the digital signal from Sheboygan expected to fully cover the county, southern Manitowoc County and northern Ozaukee County.

=== In Milwaukee ===
According to FCC records, Sheboygan Community Broadcasting sold the station on November 23, 2009, to Polnet Communications, which provides ethnic programming in Polish and other languages and owns several ethnic radio stations in the Chicago area, and formerly had a time-lease arrangement for Polish language television programming on WCIU-DT6 in Chicago before launching their own station in the area in 2010, WPVN-CA (channel 24). Polnet planned to air "quality ethnic programming", according to their FCC statements, but never actually broadcast any programming as its entire twelve-year ownership period had them struggle to build out the station's permanent digital facilities.

A construction permit for channel 36 from the Milwaukee PBS Tower in Milwaukee was contested by Milwaukee PBS (then branded as MPTV) itself, which asserted their existing analog rights from WMVT being on analog channel 36 to place a digital translator station for WMVS there to address inefficiencies with WMVS's digital channel 8 signal in Milwaukee proper. Polnet subsequently withdrew the application for 36 and petitioned for a digital application on channel 30 in early December 2009, also from the Milwaukee PBS Tower. The placement of the station's transmitter in Milwaukee likely meant that Polnet did not intend to keep any kind of service to Sheboygan, and the placement of the analog tower in Random Lake was solely intended to "skip" the station down to Milwaukee, a move allowed under FCC regulations.

On April 9, 2010, the station was reclassified as a low-power station, and took the lettered calls WPVS-LP. On January 3, 2011, the FCC authorized the change of city of license from Sheboygan to Milwaukee with a license expiration of December 2013. The station's license was to expire on December 1, 2021; it has continued to operate under 'silent and licensed' authority from the FCC, with occasional operation from the rented Random Lake site to maintain the license while it looks to permanently operate from the Milwaukee PBS Tower.

On July 31, 2018, HC2 Holdings announced it would purchase WPVS-LP for $400,000, and in the interim a new construction permit for VHF channel 9 from the Milwaukee PBS tower has been filed (HC2 had filed a purchase agreement for WPVN in Chicago two months before). This would have had WPVS-LP become a sister station to WTSJ-LP (channel 38). However, the sale never closed and it remained owned by Polvision past the July 13, 2021, deadline to build permanent digital facilities, and the station was under a perpetual cycling of tolling and special temporary authority requests to remain silent throughout the late 2010s into 2021.

On November 3, 2021, it was announced that SagamoreHill Broadcasting would purchase WPVS-LP for $100,000 under subsidiary Roseland Broadcasting; the sale was completed on June 29, 2022.

The station was licensed for digital operation on channel 9 effective January 14, 2022. As of October 2023, the station broadcasts four subchannels, with the main channel carrying a network of unknown origin called SportStak. Before the end of 2023, when it began to map channels by its originally intended physical channel of 29, it had mapped its channels from channel 9.2 for its physical channel, presumably to avoid any confusion with Chicago's WGN-TV. Its station identification also erroneously identifies WXON-LD, a low-power television station in Flint, Michigan, which is also on RF channel 9, but is not owned by SagamoreHill itself.

The station changed its callsign to WWMW-LD as of April 29, 2024. At the start of July 2024, the station's manager, Roseland Broadcasting, launched a centrist/moderate political news channel, Purple TV, across both WWMW and its Madison sister station, WMWI-LD on its main channel, timed with the 2024 Republican National Convention taking place in Milwaukee, and with it, another virtual channel change back to its second Sheboygan-era channel of 16 took place.

== Subchannels ==
The station's signal is multiplexed:

Subchannels of WWMW-LD
Subchannel	Res.	Short name	Programming
16.1	720p	WWMW-LD	Purple TV
16.2	480i	SportSt	SportStak
16.3	480i	OnTV4U	OnTV4U
16.4	480i	JTV	Jewelry TV
16.5	480i	Sonlife	SonLife
16.6	480i	Nost	NOST
16.7	480i	Diya	Diya TV
