= KBTV =

KBTV may refer to:

== Current television stations ==
- KBTV-TV, a television station (channel 4) licensed to Port Arthur, Texas, United States
- KBTV-CD, a television station (channel 8) licensed to Sacramento, California, United States

== Former television stations ==
- KBTV, the callsign of WFAA from 1949 to 1950, a television station (channel 8) licensed to Dallas, Texas, United States
- KBTV, the callsign of KUSA from 1952 to 1984, a television station (channel 9) licensed to Denver, Colorado, United States

== Airports ==
- The ICAO code for Burlington International Airport in Burlington, Vermont, United States
