= Channel 9 digital TV stations in the United States =

The following television stations broadcast on digital channel 9 in the United States:

- K09AI-D in Las Vegas, New Mexico
- K09BE-D in Ekalaka, Montana
- K09BG-D in Basin, Montana
- K09BI-D in Methow, Washington
- K09BX-D in Saco, Montana
- K09CJ-D in Cedar City, Utah, on virtual channel 2, which rebroadcasts KUTV
- K09DF-D in Juliaetta, Idaho
- K09DM-D in Cortez, Colorado
- K09DW-D in Ruth, Nevada
- K09DY-D in Westcliffe, Colorado
- K09EA-D in Ely & Mcgill, Nevada
- K09EP-D in Grants, etc., New Mexico
- K09ES-D in Cashmere, Washington
- K09FJ-D in Pioche, Nevada
- K09FK-D in Ursine, Nevada
- K09FL-D in Caliente, Nevada
- K09FQ-D in Thompson Falls, Montana
- K09HY-D in Glasgow, Montana
- K09IV-D in Plevna, Montana
- K09JG-D in Malta, Montana
- K09KJ-D in Tierra Amarilla, New Mexico
- K09LO-D in Cascade, Idaho
- K09LW-D in Martinsdale/Lennep, Montana
- K09MH-D in White Sulphur Springs, Montana
- K09MY-D in Polaris, Montana
- K09NH-D in Shungnak, Alaska
- K09NI-D in Mekoryuk, Alaska
- K09NK-D in Perryville, Alaska
- K09NO-D in Pilot Point, Alaska
- K09OT-D in Valdez, Alaska
- K09OV-D in Kotzebue, Alaska
- K09OW-D in Nome, Alaska
- K09OY-D in Colstrip, Montana
- K09PC-D in Grayling, Alaska
- K09PJ-D in Ouray, Colorado
- K09PL-D in Dingle, etc., Idaho
- K09PO-D in Chevak, Alaska
- K09QC-D in McGrath, Alaska
- K09QG-D in Chalkyitsik, Alaska
- K09QH-D in Kenai, Alaska
- K09QK-D in Karluk, Alaska
- K09QM-D in Nelson Lagoon, Alaska
- K09QP-D in Kake, Alaska
- K09QR-D in Gambell, Alaska
- K09QU-D in Togiak, Alaska
- K09QW-D in King Cove, Alaska
- K09QX-D in St. Michael, Alaska
- K09RA-D in Sand Point, Alaska
- K09RB-D in St. Paul, Alaska
- K09RC-D in Unalakleet, Alaska
- K09RE-D in St. George, Alaska
- K09RF-D in Eagle Village, Alaska
- K09RP-D in False Pass, Alaska
- K09SA-D in Koyuk, Alaska
- K09SD-D in Lemhi, etc., Idaho
- K09SG-D in Goodnews Bay, Alaska
- K09SL-D in Kotlik, Alaska
- K09SP-D in Igiugig, Alaska
- K09SR-D in Port Lions, Alaska
- K09SU-D in Hildale, etc., Utah
- K09TH-D in Gunnison, Colorado, on virtual channel 2
- K09TK-D in Elfin Cove, Alaska
- K09TR-D in Kalskag, Alaska
- K09TT-D in Circle, Alaska
- K09TW-D in Venetie, Alaska
- K09TX-D in Kaltag, Alaska
- K09UP-D in Colville, Washington
- K09VC-D in Paisley, Oregon
- K09VL-D in Boyes & Hammond, Montana
- K09WB-D in Powderhorn, Colorado, on virtual channel 9, which rebroadcasts K25PT-D
- K09XK-D in Sheridan, Wyoming
- K09XL-D in Douglas, Wyoming
- K09XW-D in Palm Desert, etc., California
- K09XY-D in Coolin, Idaho
- K09YE-D in La Pine, Oregon
- K09YH-D in Scottsbluff, Nebraska
- K09YK-D in Durango, Purgatory, Colorado
- K09YO-D in Thomasville, Colorado
- K09YP-D in Mink Creek, Idaho, on virtual channel 7, which rebroadcasts KUED
- K09YR-D in Harlowton, Montana
- K09YT-D in Sula, Montana
- K09YW-D in Leamington, Utah
- K09YZ-D in Beeville-Refugio, Texas
- K09ZA-D in Leavenworth, Washington
- K09ZB-D in Havre, Montana
- K09ZK-D in Long Valley Junction, Utah
- K09ZN-D in Blanding/Monticello, Utah
- K09ZO-D in Juab, Utah
- K09ZP-D in Sigurd & Salina, Utah
- K09ZQ-D in Marysvale, Utah
- K09ZR-D in Woodland & Kamas, Utah
- K09ZS-D in Gateway, Colorado
- K09ZT-D in Beaver, Utah
- K09ZU-D in East Price, Utah, on virtual channel 5, which rebroadcasts KSL-TV
- K09ZV-D in Helper, Utah
- K09ZW-D in Roosevelt, etc., Utah, on virtual channel 5, which rebroadcasts KSL-TV
- K09AAD-D in Sitka, Alaska
- K09AAF-D in Monterey, California
- KACV-TV in Amarillo, Texas
- KAFT in Fayetteville, Arkansas
- KAWE in Bemidji, Minnesota, on virtual channel 9
- KBCI-LD in Bonners Ferry, Idaho
- KBHO-LD in Richmond, Texas
- KBMN-LD in Houston, Texas, on virtual channel 40
- KBOI-TV in Boise, Idaho
- KCAL-TV in Los Angeles, California, on virtual channel 9
- KCAU-TV in Sioux City, Iowa
- KCEN-TV in Temple, Texas
- KCFW-TV in Kalispell, Montana
- KCRG-TV in Cedar Rapids, Iowa
- KCTS-TV in Seattle, Washington, on virtual channel 9
- KDSE in Dickinson, North Dakota
- KECY-TV in El Centro, California
- KEZI in Eugene, Oregon
- KFNR in Rawlins, Wyoming
- KFWD in Fort Worth, Texas, on virtual channel 52
- KGMD-TV in Hilo, Hawaii
- KGUN-TV in Tucson, Arizona
- KIXE-TV in Redding, California
- KKCO in Paonia, Colorado
- KLRN in San Antonio, Texas
- KMSP-TV in Minneapolis, Minnesota, on virtual channel 9
- KMYU in St. George, Utah, to move to channel 21, on virtual channel 2
- KNPG-LD in Saint Joseph, Missouri, on virtual channel 21
- KOPA-CD in Gillette, Wyoming
- KPDS-LD in Wolcott, Indiana, on virtual channel 49
- KPNE-TV in North Platte, Nebraska
- KSDX-LD in San Diego, California, on virtual channel 9
- KTRE in Lufkin, Texas
- KUAC-TV in Fairbanks, Alaska
- KUBN-LD in Madras, Oregon
- KUSA in Denver, Colorado, on virtual channel 9
- KVIE in Sacramento, California, on virtual channel 6
- KVVG-LD in Porterville, California
- KVVU-TV in Henderson, Nevada
- KWES-TV in Odessa, Texas
- KXLH-LD in Helena, Montana
- KXMN-LD in Spokane, etc., Washington
- W09AF-D in Sylva, North Carolina
- W09AG-D in Franklin, North Carolina
- W09AT-D in Fajardo, Puerto Rico, on virtual channel 2, which rebroadcasts WKAQ-TV
- W09CZ-D in Roslyn, New York, on virtual channel 17
- W09DB-D in Williamsport, Pennsylvania
- W09DJ-D in Wilkes-Barre, etc., Pennsylvania
- W09DL-D in Mount Vernon, Illinois, on virtual channel 42
- WAFB in Baton Rouge, Louisiana
- WALA-TV in Mobile, Alabama
- WAOW in Wausau, Wisconsin
- WBON-LD in Richmond, Kentucky
- WBPH-TV in Bethlehem, Pennsylvania, on virtual channel 60
- WEDN in Norwich, Connecticut, on virtual channel 53
- WEQT-LD in Atlanta, Georgia, on virtual channel 9
- WFLA-TV in Tampa, Florida, on virtual channel 8
- WFMZ-TV in Allentown, Pennsylvania, uses WBPH-TV's spectrum, on virtual channel 69
- WGWW in Anniston, Alabama
- WHAM-TV in Rochester, New York
- WHCQ-LD in Cleveland, Mississippi
- WILL-TV in Urbana, Illinois
- WISH-TV in Indianapolis, Indiana, on virtual channel 8
- WJAL in Silver Spring, Maryland, uses WUSA's spectrum, on virtual channel 68
- WJCT in Jacksonville, Florida
- WJHL-TV in Johnson City, Tennessee
- WLVT-TV in Allentown, Pennsylvania, uses WBPH-TV's spectrum, on virtual channel 39
- WMAE-TV in Booneville, Mississippi
- WMUM-TV in Cochran, Georgia
- WMUR-TV in Manchester, New Hampshire, on virtual channel 9
- WNDY-TV in Marion, Indiana, uses WISH-TV's spectrum, on virtual channel 23
- WNGG-LD in Gouverneur, New York
- WNIN in Evansville, Indiana
- WNSH-LD in Nashville, Tennessee
- WPGX in Panama City, Florida
- WPPT in Philadelphia, Pennsylvania, uses WBPH-TV's spectrum, on virtual channel 35
- WPVS-LD in Milwaukee, Wisconsin
- WRCX-LD in Dayton, Ohio
- WSLN in Freeport, Illinois
- WSUR-DT in Ponce, Puerto Rico, on virtual channel 9
- WSVN in Miami, Florida, on virtual channel 7
- WTOV-TV in Steubenville, Ohio
- WTTA in St. Petersburg, Florida, uses WLFA-TV's spectrum, on virtual channel 38
- WTVC in Chattanooga, Tennessee
- WTVD in Durham, North Carolina, on virtual channel 11
- WTVI in Charlotte, North Carolina, on virtual channel 42
- WUSA in Washington, D.C., on virtual channel 9
- WVPB-TV in Huntington, West Virginia
- WWTV in Cadillac, Michigan

The following stations, which are no longer licensed, formerly broadcast on digital channel 9:

- K09BJ-D in Entiat, Washington
- K09CL-D in Rock Island, Washington
- K09FF-D in Squilchuck St. Park, Washington
- K09QD-D in Huslia, Alaska
- K09QE-D in Larsen Bay, Alaska
- K09QL-D in Allakaket, Alaska
- K09RG-D in Kongiganak, Alaska
- K09RV-D in Arctic Village, Alaska
- K09SO-D in Chignik Lagoon, Alaska
- K09TM-D in Kakhonak, Alaska
- K09UB-D in Whittier, Alaska
- K09WP-D in Checkerboard, Montana
- K09XO-D in Homer, Alaska
- K09YQ-D in Ketchikan, Alaska
- KABY-TV in Aberdeen, South Dakota
- W09CT-D in Mathias, etc., West Virginia
