= Del Harrison =

American stand-up comedian

Del Harrison is an American stand-up comedian from New Orleans. On top of being a comedian, she is also an actress, soul singer, writer, host and entrepreneur. Her comedy, stage presence and onstage persona have gained her a large following from fans. She has a large following on social media and she designed her own shirt line, which she regular sells out at her shows.

== Early life ==
Harrison was born in New Orleans, Louisiana. She grew up as an only child living with her mother and grandmother. She took courses at the Computer Learning Center in Alexandria, Virginia. She eventually landed a job in technical support. She worked there until she met an actress named Toni Hunter who would ultimately steer her career back into entertainment.

== Career ==
Her comedy career broke out in In 2005. She was eventually named one of the best new faces of comedy at Jamie Foxx’s Laffapalooza. Then, Harrison was offered a spot on Robert Towsend's stand-up comedy show Partners in Crime: The Next Generation Atlanta on the Black Family Channel. In 2009, Harrison moved to New York City where she created Another Sketch Comedy Show and kicked it off by spoofing The Mo'Nique Show (BET).

In 2011, Harrison made her big-stage acting debut when she co-starred in and wrote for the stage-play After the Walk, alongside Grammy-winner Kelly Price. In 2013 she debuted on MTV’s Made, hosting Caribbean Comedy Wednesdays.

During 2014-2015, Harrison was a featured comedian on the Fox Broadcasting Company’s new stand-up show Laughs, Arise Entertainment 360, NickMom’s new web series Actual Housewives of PTO, FLOW (the stage play), two independent films and also did the voice-overs for Fox's Laughs. Over her career, her sketches have reached a combined total of over two million views.
