= WGSR =

WGSR may refer to:

- WGSR-LD, a low-power television station (channel 19) licensed to serve Reidsville, North Carolina, United States
- Water-gas shift reaction
