= WRCX-LD =

Television station in Dayton, Ohio

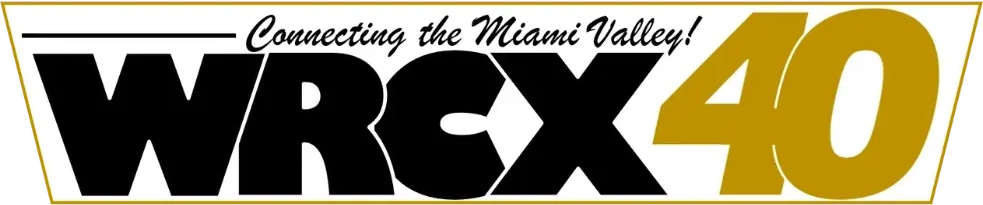
- Dayton, Ohio; United States
- Channels: Digital: 9 (VHF); Virtual: 40
- Branding: WRCX-TV 40

Programming
- Affiliations: 40.1: Independent; for others, see § Subchannels

Ownership
- Owner: Ross Communications, Ltd.

History
- Founded: August 24, 1987
- First air date: August 21, 1995
- Former call signs: W56BR (1987–1994); W51CJ (1994–1995); WUCT-LP (1995–2000); WRCX-LP (2000–2021)
- Former channel numbers: Analog: 51 (UHF, 1995–2002), 40 (UHF, 2002–2018)
- Former affiliations: The WB (1995–1999); Pax/i/Ion (1999–2001, 2008–2012); MBC Channel (2001–2004); Black Family Channel (2004–2007); Independent (2007−2008, 2012−2013); Soul of the South (2013–2016); AMGTV (2016−2018, 2021−2022); Jewelry Television/Entertainment Studios (2016–2018); Silent (2018–2021)
- Call sign meaning: Ross Communications

Technical information
- Licensing authority: FCC
- Facility ID: 69535
- Class: LD
- ERP: 3 kW
- HAAT: 292.2 m (959 ft)
- Transmitter coordinates: 39°43′28″N 84°15′18″W

Links
- Public license information: LMS
- Website: watchwrcx.tv

WRCX-LD (channel 40) is a low-power independent television station in Dayton, Ohio, United States. The station is owned by Ross Communications, Ltd., and its transmitter is located on Gettysburg Avenue south of Dayton.

== History ==
The station was founded on August 24, 1987, and signed on for the first time on August 21, 1995, as WB affiliate WUCT-LP (channel 51). However, it lost the affiliation to WBDT in 1999, in part due to management trouble. WBDT's then-ownership group (ACME Communications) was run by Jamie Kellner, the founding president of The WB.

Ross Communications, owned by Dayton resident Glenn "Skip" Ross, purchased the station from Higher Calling Enterprises. At one point, the Higher Calling group was locked out of the building due to unpaid rent. The station's lone master control operator at the time, broke into the building to bring the station back on the air.

Upon taking the station over, Ross began programming to appeal to the area's minority community, and offered programming unavailable on other stations.

During the time of transition of ownership, the previous group was barred from going onto the property, while the legal battles over the license continued.

=== New ownership and staff ===
Although the company's offices are located on Hillcrest Avenue in Dayton, the station continued to physically broadcast from WUCT-LP's studios on Gettysburg Avenue, which housed the transmitter and was owned by WPTD, the local PBS station. The building serviced as studios, offices, and the transmitter facility for WRCX-LP, WUCT-LP and WPTD.

Ross replaced Program Director Walter Briggs, a local sports personality, with Michael Crook, who had been a master control operator at various television stations. Ross also employed the services of Fran Robinson, who at the time was an on-air personality at local station WDTN, although she was mostly on the production side, rarely appearing on-air. She mostly did voiceovers for commercials that the company did for the local Ross automobile dealerships, owned by Ross' cousin.

=== Programming ===
With supervision from Ross, Crook ensured that new programming was added constantly, including children's programming, such as Zebby's Zoo and Blinky Bill. During this time of transition, sports programming was added, which consisted mostly of live coverage of black college teams. The station added numerous musical specials.

When the September 11, 2001, attacks occurred, the station aired around the clock news coverage, thanks in large part to agreements with World Harvest Television, America One, and a special arrangement with CNN. WRCX-LP was also one of the many stations nationwide who aired a live concert as a benefit for the victims' families.

For a time, the station aired Music and the Spoken Word, a program produced by the LDS Church, and aired by WRCX-LP through an agreement with the church that was negotiated by Crook. This program was added upon Ross' learning that Gladys Knight is a member of the church. Another religious show, Singsation!, aired from Chicago. That program was removed from the lineup in 2001, due to a lack of new episodes being produced.

Around this time, Ross was searching for a network that would provide programming and resources for WRCX-LP. Ross wanted UPN, which was on the Miami Valley Channel, a cable-only channel operated by WHIO-TV, but did not receive the affiliation. Another network considered was Pax TV; at the time, Pax's local affiliate was WBDT, which aired Pax's programming in the mornings and overnights; the idea was dropped when it was learned the network wanted a ten-year deal. WRCX-LP eventually became an affiliate of Black Family Channel, then known as MBC, a network that caters to black families.

Also added during this time was an agreement with the Cleveland Cavaliers.

=== Move from channel 51 to channel 40 ===
The station began to transition to facilities at the Hillcrest location, in preparation for the loss of their channel 51 signal. WRCX-LP began sending a signal directly to the cable company to ensure that they would remain available to most of their viewers while arrangements were made to broadcast on channel 40.

In spring 2002, fellow Dayton station WKEF took over the channel 51 slot for its digital allocation, leaving WRCX-LP without an over-the-air signal for a time, though it remained on channel 22 for much of the area's Time Warner Cable subscribers. The station soon gained approval to broadcast on channel 40.

In 2004, the license and ownership transferred to Ross Communications after years of appeals and battles with one of WUCT-LP's former members. The station broadcast original and syndicated programming to Dayton and the Miami Valley, including high school sports coverage.

=== Black Family Channel and Ion ===
WRCX-LP "ION 40" logo, briefly used in the Summer of 2008.

On April 24, 2007, Black Family Channel announced that it would cease as a cable channel, effective April 30, 2007, as part of a deal in which BFC's programming and subscriber base would be sold to the Gospel Music Channel. It was announced on June 3, 2008, that the station would become the newest affiliate of Ion Television, as announced on the home page of its website. However, as of June 25, 2008, the station did not appear in the station listings for Ion's website, and the deal was not announced until July 24. This returned Ion service to southwestern Ohio for the first time since the early 2000s, after the Ion network itself (then Paxson Communications) sold channel 26 to ACME Communications to become the area's WB/CW affiliate as WBDT. In 2012, the station announced via its website that Ion Television had decided to no longer provide its programming to WRCX-LP. The station substituted other programming in place of Ion. WRCX-LP became an affiliate of Soul of the South Network in October 2013. In 2016, the station switched to programming from AMGTV, Jewelry Television, and Entertainment Studios.

=== Digital television ===
In the summer of 2009, WRCX-LP began the transition to digital. It shut off its analog signal to install a new digital transmitter, but encountered technical problems resulting in its old analog transmitter being turned back on for the time being. It remained on the air until August 1, 2018, when the station temporarily ceased operations after being informed by T-Mobile that cellular service in the 600 MHz band would begin the following August 17; WRCX-LP was allotted digital channel 9 as part of the Federal Communications Commission (FCC)'s spectrum reallocation process. That same day, WRCX-LP's displacement construction permit was granted by the FCC. The station made some progress in the succeeding nine months toward building the facility, but all work halted after the May 27, 2019, tornado outbreak struck the Dayton area. The WRCX-LP facility sustained damage to its roof, air conditioning compressors, satellite dishes and tower, while principals in Ross Communications also dealt with damage to their homes; the group asked the FCC for a special 180-day extension in order to not lose its license on August 1, 2019. Despite being off the air, WRCX-LP has remained available on Charter Spectrum cable in the Dayton area. The station finally signed on its digital signal on January 8, 2021.

== Subchannels ==
The station's signal is multiplexed:

Subchannels of WRCX-LD
Subchannel	Res.	Short name	Programming
40.1	1080i	WRCXHD1	Main WRCX-LD programming
40.2	1080i	WRCXHD2	Defy
40.3	480i	WRCXSD3	365BLK
40.4	480i	WRCXSD4	Video Mix TV
40.5	480i	WRCXSD5	Urban Trendsetters
40.6	480i	WRCXSD6	MovieSphere Gold

== See also ==
- Channel 40 virtual TV stations in the United States
- Channel 9 digital TV stations in the United States
- List of television stations in Ohio
- List of television stations in Ohio (by channel number)
- List of television stations in the United States by call sign (initial letter W)
