= Visión Latina =

American Spanish-language TV network

- Type: Broadcast television network
- Country: United States

History
- Launched: January 1, 2022; 4 years ago

Links
- Website: www.visionlatina.com

Visión Latina is an American Spanish-language religious television network airing programs produced by the Universal Church of the Kingdom of God, as well as some secular programming. It has mostly low-power affiliates across large metropolitan areas of the United States, most of which are former Azteca América affiliates. The Universal Church also owns an English-language channel, ULFN (the Universal Living Faith Network).

The brand is also used by radio station KWIZ since 2023.

== History and programming ==
Visión Latina started broadcasting at midnight on January 1, 2022, replacing Azteca América on KJLA in Los Angeles. The channel has its studios in Los Angeles where it produces both religious (UCKG formats such as Rompiendo el Silencio, Habla Que Te Escucho, Los Milagros de Jesús, a prayer segment with Bishop Clodomir Santos) and secular programming (the newscast La Voz de la Ciudad, gossip show Famosos and the current affairs program Punto de Visión). Other programming as of 2023 included Latina Kids and biblical telenovelas produced for Brazil's Record network, dubbed in Spanish. Before its launch, the UCKG operated a network of Spanish-speaking channels called Canal de la Fe, with locally originated programming on KWHY in Los Angeles, as early as August 2018. Promotion of the channel was limited to UCKG chapters and organizations. The network also employs reporters in some cities. The network claims that 95% of its programming is secular in nature.

The shutdown of Azteca América saw Visión Latina filling the void left by the network, in an attempt to increase its number of affiliates. The network at launch was available in seven states, within a year, it was made available in 42. In Chicago, it moved from WJYS to WPVN-CD, the latter being the former Azteca affiliate, and in October 2022, the ethnic format on KBTV-CD in Sacramento moved to the second subchannel in order to give the network a local affiliate (being replaced in May 2024 by game show channel Buzzr).

Nicaraguan and Panamanian versions of the channel exist on cable in their respective countries. There is also a Canadian version in Spanish, English and Portuguese. International branches receive selected programming from the main facilities in Los Angeles, including the biblical telenovelas.

== Affiliates ==
At launch, a significant number of Visión Latina and Canal de la Fe affiliates were owned by HC2 Holdings. As of August 2026, the network has the following stations:

- Los Angeles, CA: KJLA 57.1
- San Diego, CA: KSDY-LD 50.4
- Miami, FL: WSBS-CD 22.2 with WSBS-TV 22.2 in Key West
- Albuquerque, NM: KQDF-LD 25.1

=== Canal de la Fe ===
- Los Angeles, CA: KWHY 63.1
- Chicago, IL: WJYS 62.7
- Bakersfield, CA: KBBV-CD 19.2
