= WLXI =

Television station in Greensboro, North Carolina

- Greensboro–Winston-Salem–; High Point, North Carolina; United States
- City: Greensboro, North Carolina
- Channels: Digital: 33 (UHF), shared with WUNL-TV; Virtual: 43

Programming
- Affiliations: 43.1: TCT

Ownership
- Owner: Total Christian Television; (Radiant Life Ministries, Inc.)

History
- First air date: March 5, 1984
- Former channel numbers: Analog: 61 (UHF, 1984–2009); Digital: 43 (UHF, until 2018), 25 (UHF, 2018–2019), 20 (UHF, 2019–2023)
- Former affiliations: Independent (1984–1985); TBN (1985–2007)
- Call sign meaning: "LXI" = Roman numeral 61 (former analog channel)

Technical information
- Licensing authority: FCC
- Facility ID: 54452
- ERP: 1,000 kW
- HAAT: 500 m (1,640 ft)
- Transmitter coordinates: 36°22′31.7″N 80°22′17.5″W

Links
- Public license information: Public file; LMS
- Website: www.tct.tv

WLXI (channel 43) is a religious television station licensed to Greensboro, North Carolina, United States, serving the Piedmont Triad area. The station is owned by Total Christian Television (TCT). WLXI shares a transmitter on Sauratown Mountain with the Triad's PBS North Carolina satellite, WUNL-TV. Programs are fed to the transmitter from the TCT studio center in Marion, Illinois; WLXI maintained studios on Patterson Street in Greensboro until TCT ended local operations nationally in June 2018.

WLXI went on the air in 1984 and originally aired music videos. This lasted for under 18 months until a new owner who vehemently objected to the music video format converted the station to all-Christian programming in the summer of 1985. The station was sold to national Christian broadcaster Trinity Broadcasting Network soon afterward. Four years later, current owner TCT bought the station and retained it as a TBN affiliate for almost two decades before switching to its own religious programming.

== History ==
UHF channel 61 was first assigned to Greensboro in the 1960s, but no application was made for it until 1979, when Consolidated Broadcasting Corporation filed with the Federal Communications Commission (FCC), to build it. It originally proposed a low-power facility operating on the former tower of WFMY-TV. Consolidated's principals included Eugene Johnston, a Greensboro attorney, and two lawyers from Winston-Salem. The FCC granted the construction permit on July 28, 1981, but before going on air, Johnston exited most of his share in the business as a result of having been elected to Congress in 1980. At that time, it was hoped that WLXI would be in service by midyear from a tower used by WQMG and studios that a decade earlier had housed WUBC (channel 48), a short-lived UHF outlet.

However, it would be another two years, as Consolidated opted instead to build studios near Kernersville. By February 1983, Consolidated had decided instead to format the station as an all-music video outlet. Under this format, WLXI began broadcasting on March 5, 1984, with an airstaff of local video jockeys (VJs); the first program manager left within a week of signing on. Despite difficulties attracting advertisers to the format and turnover of the entire initial staff (including on-air and sales employees), ownership claimed to have found stable footing by November. A stunt in which the station played "This is the Life" by "Weird Al" Yankovic for 18 straight hours attracted national press attention.

This was not enough to save the station's format as Billy Satterfield of Winston-Salem bought controlling interest in Consolidated Broadcasters. On July 1, VJ Todd Yohn walked off the job after playing "Take This Job and Shove It" by Johnny Paycheck after hearing rumors that WLXI had been sold to a religious broadcaster. Another VJ resigned the next day, with Jay Johnson telling viewers he was leaving "because I feel like the station won't exist very much longer". WLXI experienced no further staff changes for the rest of July, but on August 1, another VJ, Erin Spencer, and a receptionist were fired by Satterfield. Spencer told the News & Record that when Satterfield fired her, he said to her, "You shouldn't be doing this. It's the devil's work. Think of those 7- and 8-year-olds who are watching and being influenced. Video music is the work of the devil." Spencer also said that Satterfield intended to turn channel 61 into a Christian station.

The next day, Satterfield confirmed the station would gradually switch to an all-Christian format and that he had met with executives of the Trinity Broadcasting Network (TBN). TBN then bought WLXI from Satterfield for $300,000 and a $1.4 million loan to cover station debts. The full conversion to TBN programming took place in September 1985 ahead of the network closing on the sale in February.

In 1989, TBN put WLXI and KNAT-TV in Albuquerque, New Mexico, up for sale; one possible reason was that cable systems in the area had dropped WLXI in 1986 for not having a measurable audience. Two years later, it sold WLXI to Tri-State Christian Television (TCT) of Marion, Illinois, for $1.9 million, giving TCT its first station in the South. In April 2007, TCT pulled TBN programming from its stations in favor of programming supplied by the company.

From 1993 to 2009, WLXI's signal was relayed on low-power translator station W18BG (channel 18, now WMDV-LD) in Danville, Virginia. In June 2009, that station was sold to the Star News Corporation (owners of WGSR-LD in that market) and stopped rebroadcasting WLXI's programming.

At the end of June 2018, TCT closed WLXI's local studio and ended its local programming with the FCC's repeal of the Main Studio Rule, and the station from then on would be programmed through TCT's default national schedule.

== Technical information ==
=== Subchannel ===
WLXI is broadcast as one subchannel on a shared multiplex with WUNL-TV.

Subchannels of WUNC-TV/WUNL-TV and WRAY-TV/WLXI
License	Subchannel	Res.	Short name	Programming
WUNC-TV/WUNL-TV	4.1/26.1	1080i	PBS NC	PBS
WUNC-TV/WUNL-TV	4.2/26.2	480i	ROOTLE	PBS Kids
WUNC-TV/WUNL-TV	4.3/26.3	480i	UNC-EX	The Explorer Channel
WUNC-TV/WUNL-TV	4.4/26.4	480i	NCCHL	The North Carolina Channel
WRAY-TV/WLXI	30.1/43.1	1080i	WRAY/WLXI	TCT

=== Analog-to-digital conversion ===
WLXI shut down its analog signal on June 12, 2009, as part of the FCC-mandated transition to digital television for full-power stations. The station then adopted channel 43 as its virtual channel instead of 61.
