= WPVN-CD =

Television station in Chicago

- Chicago, Illinois; United States
- Channels: Digital: 26 (UHF); Virtual: 24

Programming
- Affiliations: see § Subchannels

Ownership
- Owner: Innovate Corp.; (HC2 Station Group, Inc.)
- Sister stations: W31EZ-D

History
- Founded: May 27, 1987
- Former call signs: W24AJ (1987–2007); W22DG-D (2007–May 2009); W20CX-D (May–June 2009); WPVN-CA (2009–2011)
- Former channel numbers: Analog: 24 (UHF, 1987–2011); Digital: 20 (UHF, 2010–2021)
- Former affiliations: Retro TV (2010−2013); Movee4U (2013−2019); Azteca América (2019−2022); Visión Latina (2023−2025); Fubo Sports Network (February–July 2025)
- Call sign meaning: Polvision

Technical information
- Licensing authority: FCC
- Facility ID: 168237
- Class: CD
- ERP: 15 kW
- HAAT: 388.4 m (1,274 ft)
- Transmitter coordinates: 41°53′56.1″N 87°37′23.2″W

Links
- Public license information: Public file; LMS

WPVN-CD (channel 24) is a low-power, Class A television station in Chicago, Illinois, United States, owned by Innovate Corp. The station's studios are located on West Belmont Avenue in northwest Chicago, with transmitter atop the John Hancock Center in downtown Chicago.

== History ==
The station became a Retro TV affiliate for the Chicago television market on November 13, 2010 (through June 30, 2013), but the main purpose of the station is to relocate much of the ethnic programming removed by Weigel Broadcasting in December 2010 when they decided to end carrying it over to WCIU-DT6.

On March 28, 2011, WPVN-CA applied to move its transmitting facilities to the Trump International Hotel and Tower from its current analog and digital locations. The application was approved on August 31, 2011, along with getting Class A digital status on October 7, 2011.

In July 2016, a 24-hour broadcast of JBTV replaced KBS World on channel 24.7.

On May 25, 2018, HC2 Holdings announced it would purchase WPVN-CD for $7 million plus costs.). it became an owned-and-operated station of HC2's network Azteca América, Replacing WCHU-LD (channel 61). With Polvision also selling off Milwaukee sister station WPVS-LP (channel 29) (which launched in eight years since Polvision's purchase of the license), the company will complete a withdrawal from over-the-air television broadcasting ownership, though retains control of WPVN's fourth subchannel.

In February 2020, WPVN-CD was issued a license to transmit from the John Hancock Center in Chicago.

In 2023, due to Azteca América ceasing operations, the station flipped to Visión Latina.

In 2025, the station flipped to Fubo Sports Network after Fubo partnered with Innovate Corp. to add the network to low-powered stations.

== Subchannels ==
The station's signal is multiplexed:

Subchannels of WPVN-CD
Subchannel	Res.	Short name	Programming
24.1	720p	WPVN-CD	Win-TV / MBC-D (Korean) / MCTV (Korean)
24.2	480i	WPVN-CD	Infomercials (4:3)
24.3	480i	WPVN-CD	SWAAG TV (Shows With African-American Greatness)
24.4	480i	WPVN-CD	365BLK
24.5	480i	WPVN-CD	America's Voice Español
24.6	480i	WPVN-CD	Defy
24.7	480i	WPVN-CD	QVC en Español
24.8	480i	WPVN-CD	Outlaw
24.9	480i	WPVN-CD	Law & Crime
24.10	480i	WPVN-CD	Fubo Sports Network
24.11	480i	WPVN-CD	Hasbro Legends
24.12	480i	WPVN-CD	Newsmax2
