= KBTV-CD =

Television station in Sacramento, California

- Sacramento–Stockton–Modesto, California; United States
- Channels: Digital: 27 (UHF); Virtual: 8

Programming
- Affiliations: 8.1: Buzzr; 8.2: Independent; for others, see § Subchannels

Ownership
- Owner: Innovate Corp.; (HC2 LPTV Holdings, Inc.)
- Sister stations: K04QR-D, KAHC-LD, KFKK-LD, KFMS-LD

History
- Founded: January 29, 1992
- First air date: December 19, 1994
- Former call signs: K25EL (1992–1996); KBTV-LP (1996–2005); KBTV-CA (2005–2011)
- Former affiliations: HSN (1994–2005); Funimation Channel (2005–2009); Independent (2009–2022, now on CD2); Visión Latina (2022–2024)

Technical information
- Licensing authority: FCC
- Facility ID: 2424
- Class: CD
- ERP: 15 kW
- HAAT: 96 metres (315 ft)
- Transmitter coordinates: 38°33′59.01″N 121°28′47.05″W

Links
- Public license information: Public file; LMS

KBTV-CD (channel 8) is a low-power, Class A television station in Sacramento, California, United States, affiliated with the digital television network Buzzr. It is also a multicultural independent station, branded on-air as Crossings TV, on its second digital subchannel. KBTV-CD is owned by Innovate Corp. and its second subchannel is also available throughout the Central Valley on Comcast Xfinity channel 398. KBTV-CD has studios on West El Camino Avenue in the Natomas district of Sacramento, in the same building as KVIE, but with completely separate operations from that station. The station's transmitter is located in downtown Sacramento. KBTV-CD on its second subchannel broadcasts programs in various ethnic languages as well as programming from Shop LC during the late-night hours.

== History ==
KBTV-CD began broadcasting as K25EL on December 19, 1994. By 1997, it was airing programming from the American Independent Network and America One as well as local programming. By 2004, it had changed formats to home shopping.

In 2005, KBTV-LP was sold to a group of investors led by Frank Washington. The new owners converted it into a multicultural station airing imported and independently produced local programming in languages including Russian, Chinese, Tagalog, and Hmong; they also secured coverage on regional Comcast cable systems. Washington had some experience with multicultural television, having installed such a format on KBCB in the Seattle market. This service grew into Crossings TV by January 2013.

Crossings itself, through Tower of Babel LLC, owned KBTV until 2010, when it was sold to Mako Communications, who conducted the station's conversion to digital television in December of that year. Mako attempted in 2013 to sell KBTV-CD to Landover 5 LLC as part of a larger deal involving 51 other low-power television stations; the sale fell through in June 2016. Mako Communications sold its stations, including KBTV-CD, to HC2 Holdings (now Innovate Corp.) in 2017.

Crossings TV moved from subchannel 8.1 to 8.2 on October 3, 2022, exchanging positions with the newly launched Visión Latina, the United States television venture of the Universal Church of the Kingdom of God, which had been added the month before.

On May 18, 2024, Visión Latina was dropped and the station affiliated with Buzzr.

== Technical information ==
=== Subchannels ===
The station's signal is multiplexed:

Subchannels of KBTV-CD
Subchannel	Res.	Short name	Programming
8.1	480i	KBTV-CD	Buzzr
8.2	480i	KBTV-CD	Crossings TV / Shop LC (12am–6am) (4:3)
8.3	480i	KBTV-CD	SonLife
8.4	480i	KBTV-CD	365BLK
8.5	480i	KBTV-CD	Defy
8.6	480i	KBTV-CD	Newsmax2
8.7	480i	KBTV-CD	Outlaw
