= WMDV-LD =

Television station in Danville, Virginia

- Danville–Martinsville, Virginia; United States
- City: Danville, Virginia
- Channels: Digital: 23 (UHF); Virtual: 23

Programming
- Affiliations: 23.1: Independent; for others, see § Subchannels

Ownership
- Owner: Star News Corporation
- Sister stations: WGSR-LD

History
- First air date: May 26, 2010
- Former call signs: W18BG, W63CR, WMDV–LP
- Former channel numbers: Analog: 18 (UHF), 63 (UHF); Digital: 45 (UHF, until 2018); Virtual: 44 (until 2018)
- Former affiliations: TBN (via WLXI-TV, 1993–2007); TCT (via WLXI-TV, 2007–2009); Dark (2009–2010)
- Call sign meaning: Wonderful Martinsville and Danville, Virginia

Technical information
- Licensing authority: FCC
- Facility ID: 67782
- Class: LD
- ERP: 15 kW
- HAAT: 150.2 m (493 ft)
- Transmitter coordinates: 36°44′32.4″N 79°23′1.2″W

Links
- Public license information: LMS

WMDV-LD (channel 23) is a low-power independent television station in Danville, Virginia, United States. Owned by the Star News Corporation, it is sister to fellow independent station WGSR-LD in Reidsville, North Carolina. WMDV-LD's transmitter is located atop White Oak Mountain south of Chatham, Virginia.

Under former owners Tri-State Christian Television (TCT), the station aired the schedule of full-power Christian broadcaster WLXI-TV from Greensboro, North Carolina. Star News re-launched the station as an independent outlet serving the cities of Martinsville and Danville.

== History ==
The station first broadcast in 1993 as W18BG. The majority of its programming was provided by the Trinity Broadcasting Network through WLXI. This arrangement ended in April 2007 when TCT replaced TBN programming with its own programming for all of its stations.

In November 2008, TCT decided to divest itself of its Danville translator. In June 2009, TCT passed ownership of W18BG to Star News, which temporarily took the station dark. In early May 2010, the Federal Communications Commission (FCC) issued the construction permit to build the station on RF channel 45, with a virtual channel number of 44 since Winston-Salem ABC affiliate WXLV-TV uses 45 as its virtual channel.

The station's callsign was changed to WMDV-LP on October 9, 2009. WMDV-LP returned to the air on the afternoon of May 26, 2010, after about 50 weeks of being dark.

== Technical information ==
=== Subchannels ===
The station's digital signal is multiplexed:

Subchannels of WMDV-LD
Subchannel	Res.	Short name	Programming
23.1	480i	WMDV-HD	Main WMDV-LD programming
23.2	480i	WMDV	Main WMDV-LD programming
23.3	480i	WMDV	MovieSphere Gold

=== 2017 auction and repack ===
In 2017, the FCC authorized the auction of TV channels 38 and above, and the subsequent relocation of all TV stations operating on those channels to new locations below channel 37. On September 1, 2018, WMDV-LD ceased broadcasting on channel 45 and commenced operation on RF channel 23. The station has also moved its virtual channel to 23 to match its RF channel.
