= Channel 40 virtual TV stations in the United States =

The following television stations operate on virtual channel 40 in the United States:

- K13ZQ-D in Lubbock, Texas
- K20MJ-D in Milton-Freewater, Oregon
- K20PC-D in Centerville, Texas
- K21KJ-D in Mineral Wells, Texas
- K22OB-D in Medford, Oregon
- K27OW-D in Rochester, Minnesota
- K28QQ-D in Williston, North Dakota
- K33PE-D in Truth or Consequences, New Mexico
- K35OZ-D in Chico, California
- K40IJ-D in Topeka, Kansas
- K40KC-D in Tulsa, Oklahoma
- KADO-CD in Shreveport, Louisiana
- KAJN-CD in Lafayette, Louisiana
- KBMN-LD in Houston, Texas
- KCWL-LD in Monroe, Louisiana
- KEJR-LD in Phoenix, Arizona
- KEVO-LD in Reno, Nevada
- KFXB-TV in Dubuque, Iowa
- KHBS in Fort Smith, Arkansas
- KHPL-CD in La Grange, Texas
- KHPM-CD in San Marcos, Texas
- KHRR in Tucson, Arizona
- KISA-LD in San Antonio, Texas
- KMMC-LD in San Francisco, California
- KRHD-CD in Bryan–College Station, Texas
- KTBN-TV in Santa Ana, California
- KTES-LD in Abilene, Texas
- KTLM in Rio Grande City, Texas
- KTXL in Sacramento, California
- KXLK-CD in Austin, Texas
- W14EQ-D in Tupelo, Mississippi
- W26EU-D in Boston, Massachusetts
- W34FF-D in Panama City, Florida
- WAAO-LD in Andalusia, Alabama
- WBUY-TV in Holly Springs, Mississippi
- WDBD in Jackson, Mississippi
- WEIN-LD in Evansville, Indiana
- WESV-LD in Chicago, Illinois
- WGGB-TV in Springfield, Massachusetts
- WGWW in Anniston, Alabama
- WHMB-TV in Indianapolis, Indiana
- WICZ-TV in Binghamton, New York
- WKUW-LD in White House, Tennessee
- WLFB in Bluefield, West Virginia
- WLMB in Toledo, Ohio
- WLZH-LD in Baltimore, Maryland
- WMGM-TV in Wildwood, New Jersey
- WMJQ-CD in Syracuse, New York
- WMTJ in Fajardo, Puerto Rico
- WMYA-TV in Anderson, South Carolina
- WNJJ-LD in New York, New York
- WNKY in Bowling Green, Kentucky
- WPCB-TV in Greensburg, Pennsylvania
- WRCX-LD in Dayton, Ohio
- WTWC-TV in Tallahassee, Florida
- WUVC-DT in Fayetteville, North Carolina
- WVDM-LD in Quincy, Illinois
- WVVC-LD in Utica, New York
- WWSB in Sarasota, Florida
- WYAT-LD in Martinsville, Virginia
- WYCI in Saranac Lake, New York

The following stations formerly operated on virtual channel 40, but are no longer licensed:

- K26NT-D in Granite Falls, Minnesota
- K40HE-D in Redding, California
- K40KQ-D in Wyola, Montana
- K40LJ-D in Lincoln, Nebraska
- WODF-LD in Rockford, Illinois
- WYDJ-LD in Myrtle Beach, South Carolina
