= Channel 40 low-power TV stations in the United States =

The following low-power television stations broadcast on digital or analog channel 40 in the United States:

- K40AE-D in Cashmere, etc., Washington, to move to channel 15
- K40IJ-D in Topeka, Kansas, to move to channel 22
- K40KC-D in Tulsa, Oklahoma, to move to channel 27

The following low-power stations, which are no longer licensed, formerly broadcast on digital or analog channel 40:

- K40BP in Alamogordo, New Mexico
- K40BX in Bigelow Bench Area, Wyoming
- K40CI in Eureka, Nevada
- K40DD-D in Gruver, Texas
- K40EE in Pullman, Washington
- K40EN in Fairbanks, Alaska
- K40FY in Randolph & Woodruff, Utah
- K40GD in Fillmore, etc., Utah
- K40GZ-D in Preston, Idaho
- K40HC in Chama, New Mexico
- K40HE-D in Redding, California
- K40HJ in Lordsburg, New Mexico
- K40HZ in Wichita Falls, Texas
- K40IK-D in Wallowa, Oregon
- K40JV-D in Stateline, etc., California
- K40KQ-D in Wyola, Montana
- K40KZ in St. George, Utah
- K40LJ-D in Lincoln, Nebraska
- KCXP-LP in Aspen, Colorado
- KFBU-LD in Bozeman, Montana
- W40AN-D in Escanaba, Michigan
- WODF-LD in Rockford, Illinois
- WYDJ-LD in Myrtle Beach, South Carolina
