= WGSR-LD =

Television station in Reidsville, North Carolina

- Reidsville–Greensboro, North Carolina; Danville, Virginia; United States
- City: Reidsville, North Carolina
- Channels: Digital: 19 (UHF); Virtual: 19
- Branding: Star-19

Programming
- Affiliations: 19.1: Independent; 19.2: Buzzr; 19.3: MovieSphere Gold

Ownership
- Owner: Star News Corporation
- Sister stations: WMDV-LD

History
- First air date: March 7, 1988
- Former call signs: W14AU (1988–1996); WXIV-LP (1996–2004); WGSR-LP (2004–2011)
- Former channel numbers: Analog: 14 (UHF, 1988–2004), 39 (UHF, 2004–2011); Digital: 47 (UHF, 2011–2018)
- Call sign meaning: "Greensboro Star"

Technical information
- Licensing authority: FCC
- Facility ID: 12834
- Class: LD
- ERP: 11.2 kW
- HAAT: 74.1 m (243 ft)
- Transmitter coordinates: 36°21′36.1″N 79°39′50.1″W

Links
- Public license information: LMS

WGSR-LD (channel 19) is a low-power independent television station in Reidsville, North Carolina, United States. Owned by the Star News Corporation, it is sister to fellow independent station WMDV-LD in Danville, Virginia. WGSR-LD's transmitter is located in downtown Reidsville, although live programming no longer emanates from the studio building there. Programming is sent from the company's main offices and studios located in Martinsville, Virginia.

== History ==
The station traces its history back to 1982 when "WCTV-3", a public-access television station on what was then Alert Cable in Reidsville launched. On March 7, 1988, the Federal Communications Commission (FCC) granted an original construction permit to then-station manager Robert Tudor to broadcast on UHF channel 14, under the call letters W14AU. Over-the-air programming was largely supplied by satellite networks, but the station produced its own nightly newscast. W14AU also began airing a weekly call-in program, Monday Night Live.

The station was sold to Carolina Blue Communications, owned by Daniel Falinski, in early 1996; the FCC approved the purchase that August. Under Falinski's leadership, the station expanded its programming to a more regional focus. Following an established custom of television stations in the Greensboro market (following WXII-TV, WXLV-TV and WLXI), the station changed its call letters to WXIV-LP (the letters "XIV" representing the roman numerals for the station's then-channel number, "14"), and changed its on-air branding to "The Boob Tube". Second-run situation comedies dominated the broadcast schedule during this period, with overnight programming brokered to a home shopping network.

WXIV-LP was forced to seek a new channel allocation in order to allow Burlington-based WGPX-TV (channel 16) to begin operating its digital signal on UHF channel 14. Engineering studies determined that moving WXIV to UHF channel 39 was the only possible allocation for the station to continue broadcasting; the station moved there in April 2004.

At the time of the channel switch, Carolina Blue Communications was in the process of selling the station to Star News Corporation, owner of Martinsville-based NewsChannel 18, a regional cable news channel. Since WXIV-LP was moving from channel 14 to channel 39, its call letters no longer held any meaning, so the station changed its call sign to WGSR-LP in 2004, reflecting the station's new "Star-39" brand (the calls were modified to WGSR-LD on June 4, 2009).

== Programming ==
WGSR-LD has expanded its local coverage of the Reidsville/Martinsville/Danville area. Star News has gained a reputation for tackling controversial subjects not approached by the region's full-power television stations, as well as giving extensive coverage to news stories in the Dan River Region.

As a service to NASCAR racing fans, WGSR-LD devotes six hours on the weekends to providing driver and race previews. When races are being run at Martinsville Speedway, coverage of racing action is significantly expanded with local reporters covering action at the track. Other sports covered by the station in weekend programs include snowmobiling, softball and obstacle track racing.

Starting before Thanksgiving and continuing almost to Christmas, the station broadcasts all of the area municipal Christmas parades and joins with the merchants of Reidsville and Stoneville in promoting holiday shopping seasons in those towns and the lighting of Christmas decorations.

WGSR-LP began organizing the annual Reidsville Downtown Christmas Parade in late 2006, and broadcasts the event live annually. Star News also produces the annual Martinsville Christmas Parade.

Prior to the shuttering of Raycom Sports's syndicated ACC sports packages and replacement with the cable-only ACC Network, WFMY-TV (channel 2) held the rights to broadcast Atlantic Coast Conference basketball games. As a result, some telecasts produced by CBS were aired on the station; until October 2006, the station also broadcast Baltimore Orioles baseball games. On May 31, 2008, WGSR-LP aired EliteXC: Primetime through its secondary affiliation with CBS, after primary affiliate WFMY declined to carry the program.

== Technical information ==
=== Subchannels ===
The station's digital signal is multiplexed:

Subchannels of WGSR-LD
Subchannel	Res.	Short name	Programming
19.1	720p	WGSR-HD	Main WGSR-LD programming
19.2	480i	BUZZR	Buzzr (4:3)
19.3	480i	Movie	MovieSphere Gold (4:3)

=== Analog-to-digital conversion ===
WGSR shut down its analog signal on June 4, 2009. The station flash-cut its digital signal into operation on UHF channel 47, and received FCC permission to use that as the station's virtual channel, instead of using its former UHF analog channel 39. The station began carrying second and third digital subchannels on August 17, 2009. Digital channel 47.1 began transmitting programming in high definition on February 23, 2011.

=== 2017 auction and repack ===
In 2017, the FCC authorized the auction of TV channels 38 and above, and the subsequent relocation of all TV stations operating on those channels to new locations below channel 37. On September 1, 2018, WGSR-LD ceased broadcasting on channel 47 and commenced operation on RF channel 19. At the time, the station retained its references to virtual channels 47.1 and 47.3.

Due to further interference issues, the station signed off on February 27, 2019, to move to a new tower. On March 23, 2019, the station returned to the air from a tower in downtown Reidsville, with its virtual channel number changed to reflect the station's physical channel 19.
