= Channel 40 digital TV stations in the United States =

The following television stations broadcast on digital channel 40 in the United States:

- K40AE-D in Cashmere, etc., Washington, to move to channel 15
- K40IJ-D in Topeka, Kansas, to move to channel 22
- K40KC-D in Tulsa, Oklahoma, to move to channel 27

The following stations, which are no longer licensed, formerly broadcast on digital channel 40:

- K40DD-D in Gruver, Texas
- K40GZ-D in Preston, Idaho
- K40HE-D in Redding, California
- K40IK-D in Wallowa, Oregon
- K40JV-D in Stateline, etc., California
- K40KQ-D in Wyola, Montana
- K40LJ-D in Lincoln, Nebraska
- W40AN-D in Escanaba, Michigan
- WODF-LD in Rockford, Illinois
- WYDJ-LD in Myrtle Beach, South Carolina
