= Black Family Channel =

- Country: United States

Ownership
- Owner: Major Broadcasting Corporation

History
- Launched: 1999; 27 years ago
- Closed: April 30, 2007; 19 years ago
- Former names: MBC (Major Broadcasting Cable) Network

Black Family Channel (launched in 1999 as MBC Network) was an American cable television network which featured programming aimed at African-American audiences. The network's schedule included a variety of programs including religious programs, sports, music, talk shows, and children's programs. During much of the time of its existence, it was the only fully black-owned and operated cable television network (BET was bought by Viacom in 2001, and TV One was owned by Comcast and Radio One at the time) in the United States.

The network was started by noted Florida attorney and philanthropist Willie E. Gary, former all-star baseball player Cecil Fielder, four-time heavyweight boxing champ Evander Holyfield, Marlon Jackson of The Jackson 5, and broadcast television veteran Alvin James through their business venture Major Broadcasting Corporation.

The channel started off as Major Broadcasting Cable (MBC) Network. The name was rebranded Black Family Channel on October 1, 2004 in hopes that it would better identify the channel's content.

BFC would effectively be run by actor/director Robert Townsend, who developed original programming for the network, including its most notable effort—the children's educational game show, Thousand Dollar Bee, in which every kid would participate in sort of tournament rounds of spelling challenges toward which the champion would receive a $1,000 bond for their college education.

Unlike its primary rival, the Viacom-owned BET, Black Family Channel avoided rap and hip hop-based programming (they showed gospel music instead). The network was available in up to 16 million households in the United States.

In June 2006, the channel started airing Total Television's King Leonardo and His Short Subjects and Looney Tunes shorts in the public domain. Prior to this (around January of that year), episodes of Tennessee Tuxedo and His Tales along with The Underdog Show also aired on the channel as well.

On April 24, 2007, BFC announced that they would cease as a cable channel, effective April 30, 2007, as part of a deal in which BFC's programming and subscriber base would be sold to the Gospel Music Channel. On May 1, 2007, the deal was closed.

The station was an associate member of the Caribbean Cable Cooperative.

== Over-the-air coverage ==
Formerly, the network was also carried on two low-power television stations, W23BC serving the Jackson, MS media market, and WRCX-LP, which serves the Dayton, Ohio area. W23BC has since affiliated with Colours TV and (more recently) America One. WRCX has since affiliated with Ion Television.
