= Scola (surname) =

Scola is an Italian surname. Notable people with the surname include:

- Angelo Scola (born 1941), Italian prelate of the Catholic Church, philosopher and theologian
- Ettore Scola (1931–2016), Italian screenwriter and film director
- Fulvio Scola (born 1982), Italian cross country skier
- Kathryn Scola (1891–1982), American screenwriter
- Luis Scola (born 1980), Argentine professional basketball player
- Robert N. Scola, Jr. (born 1955), judge of the United States District Court
- Vincenzo La Scola (1958–2011), Italian tenor
