= Channel 40 TV stations in Canada =

The following television stations formerly broadcast on digital or analog channel 40 in Canada:

- CFCN-TV-13 in Pigeon Mountain, Alberta
- CHNB-TV-13 in Miramichi, New Brunswick
- CHOT-DT in Gatineau, Quebec
- CIVK-DT-2 in Percé, Quebec
- CJCH-TV-7 in Yarmouth, Nova Scotia
- CJMT-DT in Toronto, Ontario
- CKND-DT in Winnipeg, Manitoba
