= Windstream North Carolina =

Windstream North Carolina LLC
- Company type: Private (Subsidiary of Windstream)
- Industry: Telecommunications
- Founded: 1948
- Products: Local Telephone Service
- Parent: Alltel (until 2006); Windstream (2006-present)
- Website: windstream.com

Windstream North Carolina LLC is a telephone company operating in the state of North Carolina.

== History ==
Windstream North Carolina was established in 1948 as the Thermal Belt Telephone Company. It was founded to establish telephone service in Polk County, North Carolina.

In 1974, Thermal Belt Telephone absorbed the operations of Eastern Rowan Telephone, Mid-Carolina Telephone, and Mooresville Telephone. Following the merger, Thermal Belt Telephone became Mid-Carolina Telephone Company. It also absorbed The Old Town Telephone System and North Carolina Telephone in 1977.

In 1984, the company became ALLTEL-Carolina, Inc. The name was later changed to remove the hyphen.

In 2006, the company was sold to Valor Telecom, which changed its name to Windstream. It is a separate company from Windstream Concord Telephone, which was acquired by Windstream in 2007.
