= SCOLA (TV service) =

Educational organization providing international news programming

SCOLA is a non-profit educational organization that receives and re-transmits television programming from more than 140 countries in more than 170 native languages. These programs are available via Internet, satellite, and cable TV systems. SCOLA content reaches more than 20 million viewers worldwide. The service currently has one over-the-air affiliate, Miami, Florida's WLMF-LD, carrying its first channel, offering news and programming from Europe. SCOLA also has 11 different web services that provide language training resources.

== History ==
SCOLA was started by Rev. Leland Lubbers, a Jesuit priest, on the campus of Creighton University. Inspiration was drawn from worldwide satellite television systems receiving programs from a myriad of countries. Lubbers proceeded to build a $750 satellite receiver in a garage on the Creighton campus. One year later, the campus was wired with a cable TV system featuring French and Mexican television broadcasts. The one channel created was originally known as Jay TV (named after the Creighton mascot). Assisted by future SCOLA CEO Frank Lajba, Lubbers developed a computer program tracking Soviet communications satellites.

SCOLA was broadcast on the local cable service in 1992; one year, it relocated to McClelland, Iowa, building a 13.5-acre (55,000 m^{2}) plot known as the SCOLA Antenna Farm. In spring 1994, the SCOLA World Conference was held in Taiyuan, China; about 40 American educators attended. In 1995, SCOLA partnered with China Yellow River Television (based in Taiyuan, China) to send Chinese news personnel to the US to broadcast news programs from the SCOLA antenna farm. On 27 June 2008, Lubbers died.

The company has 13 full and part-time employees.

SCOLA content is streamed on the Internet and is available on a variety of cable systems throughout North America.

SCOLA has eight channels:

- Channel 1: News and variety programs mainly from Europe. The primary channel carried by cable systems offering SCOLA.
- Channel 2: Programs from 11 Spanish-speaking regions and Portuguese-speaking countries
- Channel 3 (the Confucius Institute Channel): Mandarin programs, including CYRTV and other Chinese networks.
- Channel 4: Asian broadcasts
- Channel 5: African programs
- Channel 6: Middle East programs
- Channel 7: Additional Asian/Near East programs
- Channel 8: Eurasian programs
