= WJKB =

Television station in Grundy, Virginia

- Grundy–Bristol, Virginia; Bristol–Johnson City–; Kingsport, Tennessee; United States
- City: Grundy, Virginia
- Channels: Digital: 14 (UHF), shared with WAGV; Virtual: 68
- Branding: LFTV: Living Faith Television

Programming
- Affiliations: 68.1: Religious Independent; for others, see § Subchannels

Ownership
- Owner: Living Faith Ministries, Inc. (sale to Gray Media pending)

History
- First air date: January 2, 1995
- Former call signs: WLFG (1995–2026)
- Former channel numbers: Analog: 68 (UHF, 1995–2007); Digital: 49 (UHF, 2003–2019)
- Call sign meaning: Johnson City, Kingsport and Bristol

Technical information
- Licensing authority: FCC
- Facility ID: 37808
- ERP: DTS1: 479 kW; DTS2: 0.1 kW
- HAAT: DTS1: 662 m (2,172 ft); DTS2: 482 m (1,581 ft)
- Transmitter coordinates: DTS1: 36°49′47.3″N 82°4′44.4″W; DTS2: 36°48′0.3″N 83°22′35.6″W

Links
- Public license information: Public file; LMS
- Website: livingfaithtv.com

WJKB (channel 68) is a religious independent station licensed to Grundy, Virginia, United States, serving the Tri-Cities area of southwestern Virginia and northeastern Tennessee. The station is owned by Abingdon, Virginia–based Living Faith Television. WJKB broadcasts from a two-site distributed transmission system, with transmitters near Hansonville, Virginia, and Harlan, Kentucky.

The station's programming is relayed on three satellite stations: WAGV (channel 68) in Harlan (which shares transmitter facilities with WJKB), WLFB (channel 40) in Bluefield, West Virginia (with transmitter atop East River Mountain, south of Bluefield, Virginia), and low-power WEZK-LD (channel 28) in Knoxville, Tennessee. WAGV was the first to broadcast exclusively in digital following a malfunction at its analog transmitter.

== History ==
Living Faith Television was founded by Buford Smith and began broadcasting at the start of 1995, initially simulcasting WPCB-TV in Pittsburgh. His Living Faith Ministries had previously bought airtime for programs for 19 years on WKPT-TV in Kingsport, Tennessee. Smith, who had stated that he was instructed by God to start the station, had spent a decade getting channel 68 on the air. The station grew from the original station in Grundy, Virginia, to include the other two transmitters. WAGV in Harlan, Kentucky, began broadcasting in 1999 from Fox Knob, the second-highest point in Kentucky.

Buford Smith was pastor of Tookland Pentecostal Church in Grundy until his death in May 2003. His son, Michael Smith, succeeded him president and CEO of Living Faith Television. Tookland Pentecostal Church was a major financier when the station was founded; it broke most of its ties with the station after it declared its independence in 2006.

On October 7, 2026, Living Faith Ministries filed a sale of WLFG and its satellite stations to Gray Media for $2.25 million. Gray owns WVLT-TV (channel 8) and WBXX-TV (channel 20) in the Knoxville market and WVVA-TV (channel 6) in the Bluefield market. The call sign for WLFG was changed to WJKB on November 1.

== Programming ==
The station's programming consists mostly of content by other ministries that purchase air time, along with some infomercials. Original programming is spread throughout the broadcast day by the flagship program Living Faith Now! (formerly From These Hills), along with Sing Time, Fred Schmidt, and Life Begins at Calvary, a program produced by Calvary Church of the Tri-Cities, and other programs.

== Technical information ==
The stations' signals are multiplexed:

=== WJKB/WAGV subchannels ===
Subchannels of WJKB and WAGV
Subchannel	Res.	Short name	Programming
68.1	480i	WLFG-DT	Main programming
68.2	480i	ShopLC	Shop LC
68.3	480i	ION	Ion
68.4	480i	JTV	Jewelry TV
68.5	480i	Outlaw	Outlaw
68.6	480i	Buzzr	Buzzr
68.7	480i	Defy	Defy
68.8	480i	Quest	Quest
68.9	480i	MovieSp	MovieSphere Gold (4:3)
68.11	480i	GetTv	Great

=== WLFB subchannels ===
Subchannels of WLFB
Subchannel	Res.	Short name	Programming
40.1	480i	WLFB-DT	Main WLFB programming
40.2	720p	IONplus	Shop LC
40.3	480i	Ion	MovieSphere Gold
40.4	480i	Mystery	Ion Mystery
40.5	480i	Grit	Grit
40.6	480i	Laff	Laff
40.7	480i	Bounce	Bounce TV
40.10	480i	JTV	Jewelry TV
40.12	480i	Buzzr	Buzzr

=== WEZK-LD subchannels ===
Subchannels of WEZK-LD
Subchannel	Res.	Short name	Programming
28.1	480i	WEZK-DT	Main WEZK-LD programming
28.2	480i	MovieSp	MovieSphere Gold
28.4	480i	Ace-TV	ACE TV
28.6	480i	Movies	Movies!
28.8	480i	Catchy	Catchy Comedy
28.11	480i	SBN	Sonlife
28.12	480i	QVCII	QVC2

=== Analog-to-digital conversion ===
WJKB (as WLFG) shut down its analog signal, over UHF channel 68, in May 2007. The station's digital signal remained on its pre-transition UHF channel 49, using virtual channel 68.

== Satellite stations ==
Station	City of license	Channels (RF / VC)	First air date	ERP	HAAT	Facility ID	Transmitter coordinates	Public license information
WAGV	Harlan, Kentucky	14 (UHF) (shared with WJKB); 68	August 12, 1999 (on analog channel 44)	DTS1: 479 kW; DTS2: 0.1 kW	DTS1: 662 m (2,172 ft); DTS2: 482 m (1,581 ft)	37809	DTS1: 36°49′47.3″N 82°4′44.4″W; DTS2: 36°48′0.3″N 83°22′35.6″W	Public file LMS
WEZK-LD	Knoxville, Tennessee	16 (UHF); 28	March 15, 1990	15 kW	348.3 m (1,143 ft)	61017	36°0′36″N 83°55′57″W	LMS
WLFB	Bluefield, West Virginia	25 (UHF); 40	November 2, 2000	734 kW	399 m (1,309 ft)	37806	37°13′12.3″N 81°15′19″W	Public file LMS
