= Innovate Corp. =

American financial services and holding company

- Formerly: Primus Telecommunications Group; (1994–2014); HC2 Holdings; (2014–2021)
- Type: Public
- Traded as: NYSE: VATE; Russell 2000 component
- Industry: Financial services, Broadcasting
- Founded: 1994; 32 years ago
- Headquarters: New York, New York, United States
- Key people: Paul K. Voigt (Interim CEO)
- Products: A Diversified Holding Company
- Brands: DBM Global; Pansend; HC2 Broadcasting; DTV America
- Website: www.innovatecorp.com

Innovate Corp. (formerly known as HC2 Holdings, Inc. and Primus Telecommunications Group, Inc.) is an American public financial services company founded in 1994.

== History ==
=== Beginning (1994–1997) ===
First logo as Primus Telecom

Primus commenced operations in 1994 intent on being a global, facilities-based service provider. They entered the U.S. market in 1995 by assembling their core management team and beginning operations.

In 1996, Primus began its global expansion by acquiring Australia's then-fourth largest telecommunications service provider, Axicorp. The same year, Primus obtained a long-distance carrier license in the then-newly deregulated United Kingdom and also released their initial public offering. They completed their public listing the following year with the completion of the sale of more than US$225 million in senior notes and warrants.

=== Global expansion (1997–1999) ===
Primus' global expansion continued in 1997 with key acquisitions and international network expansion. They completed the build and activation of their Australian switched network, international gateway switches in New York and Los Angeles, and trans-Pacific links. 1997 was also the beginning of Primus' growth through acquisitions. In April, Primus purchased Cam-Net Communications Network Inc. to allow them to enter the Canadian long-distance market. Later that year, Primus acquired Telepassport LLC and the assets of USFI Inc; this expanded Primus' long-distance services operations into Germany, Japan, Austria, Switzerland and South Africa.

1998 saw Primus expand their operations further in Australia with the acquisition of Eclipse Telecommunications Pty. Ltd. and Hotkey Internet Services Pty Limited. These acquisitions, along with Primus' new Australian Carriers License, meant they were able to offer Internet and data services to Australians. This, however, was not Primus' most significant activity in 1998. In February that year, they announced the acquisition of TresCom International Inc. for a sum of US$125 million which was later completed for US$150 million. The completion of this acquisition increased Primus' customer base to approximately 200,000 corporate, small and medium-sized business, residential and wholesale customers in the North America, Europe and the Asia-Pacific regions. That same year, Primus received international carrier status from Canada's Radio and Telephone Commission and signed a significant deal with Qwest for fiber and increased bandwidth capacity for their U.S. points of presence.

In March 1999, Primus' Canadian subsidiary purchased Toronto-based London Telecom Group Inc. Earlier in the year Primus also purchased GlobalServe Communications, a privately owned Canadian Internet service provider. These acquisitions were closely followed by the purchase of many of the retail operations of Telegroup Inc, including their Australian subsidiary. A long-distance telephone company based in Fairfield, Iowa with 350,000 customers around the world, Telegroup was in Chapter 11 bankruptcy before Primus purchased their assets for $72 million. Primus' growth did not end there. In March of the same year, they were granted a Type 1 Telecommunications Carrier License in Japan, which made them one of the first foreign-based carriers to be awarded the license. They were also approved for a Public Telecommunications Operations license to offer voice telephony services in France and to capitalize on their agreement to interconnect with Deutsche Telekom they purchased German Internet service provider, TCP/IP GmbH. These developments and Primus' investment in pan-European fiber optic systems such as their Atlantic Crossing 1, Aphrodite Aphrodite, Arianne, CANTAT, Gemini and TAT12/13 meant Primus at the time offered services to 25 major cities located in 11 countries, including Austria, Denmark, England, France, Germany, Italy, The Netherlands, Norway, Spain, Sweden and Switzerland. Primus continued to pursue growth through the purchase of assets in 1999. They purchased a 51% controlling stake in Brazil's fifth largest Internet service provider, Matrix Internet S.A to gain access to the Brazilian market; they also acquired DSL provider DigitalSelect LLC to improve their residential broadband capabilities and firm 1492 Technologies to add e-commerce and web services capabilities to the organization.

=== Peak (2000–2001) ===
In January Primus won the Washington Technology Fast 50 award. Later that year they were recognized by Deloitte & Touche as the fastest growing technology company according to their Fast 500 ranking, an award subsequently won by eBay in 2001 and Google in 2004. Primus continued their network expansion by furthering their relationship with Qwest, they signed an agreement to purchase capacity for their nationwide fiber optic cable ring and connecting routes. This agreement came on the back of announcements that Primus had begun strategic alliances with Akamai Technologies and Hewlett-Packard. Their relationship with Akamai involved an agreement to jointly deploy Akamai servers in select Primus points of presence to further Akamai's global content delivery capabilities. Primus' venture with Hewlett-Packard involved both parties joining forces to provide business services through HP-powered data centers across Primus' global network, the relationship involved a US$50 million investment by Hewlett-Packard. While Primus continued expanding their ATM and IP networks in the U.S. and internationally they also continued their acquisition growth strategy by purchasing LCR Telecom Group, a London-based voice and data reseller; Infinity Online Systems Inc., a Canadian Internet service provider; a 38% stake in Bekkoame Internet Inc., a Japanese Internet service provider; Shore.Net, a New-England based Internet service provider with data center facilities and InterNeXt S.A., a French Internet service provider with national operations. These acquisitions also coincided with Primus entering the Puerto Rico market by partnering with Virtual Inc. and receiving a Competitive Local Exchange Carrier (CLEC) license.

At its peak in March 2000, Primus' stock price was valued at US$51.69 per share and the business was generating US$1.2 billion in revenue annually.

=== U.S. financial downturn (2001–2004) ===
Following the dot-com bubble "bursting" in 2000, and the subsequent U.S. financial downturn and stock market crash in 2001 after September 11, Primus reportedly began scaling back growth plans and reducing their debt in response to their stock value dropping to US$0.54 in June 2002.

This pre-emptive measure allowed Primus to avoid bankruptcy at the time and continue to remain profitable and record full-year earnings before interest, taxes, depreciation, and amortization (EBITDA) of $101 million in 2002. Primus did make some acquisitions in this period purchasing the U.S. retail voice customer base of Cable & Wireless in 2002, Canadian Internet provider Magma Communications Ltd and in Australia the internet service and interactive media businesses of AOL/7 as well as small Australian dot-com firms UseOz, Blue Mountains Internet and Standard.net.

This period was still a period of growth and relative success for Primus. In 2003, Primus was added to the Russell 3000 index, a U.S. equity index that captures the 3,000 largest U.S. stocks based on market capitalization. They were included in the 2004 'Fortune 1000', Forbes magazines ranking of the largest public companies, based on revenue, in the United States and a 2002 TeleGeography study found Primus was on aggregate the world's fifth largest carrier of international public switched telephone network (PSTN) voice traffic. Primus also used this period of growth to move their stock from the NASDAQ SmallCap Market to the NASDAQ National Market to gain more transparency.

=== Financial issues (2005–2009) ===
Towards the end of 2004, Primus' stock fell 69% and continued to fall in 2005 as their core revenue streams of long-distance telephone service, dial-up Internet connections and prepaid calling began shrinking.

To remedy this trend Primus announced they would be shifting their focus from their long-distance voice heritage to become a fully integrated service provider--capable of delivering and bundling high-growth telecommunication services, including local, wireless, and broadband...with the capability of offering arrays of bundled wireline/wireless/broadband/VOIP products in its major markets.

In 2004, Primus made their first product release in line with their new vision by releasing a high-speed VoIP Internet phone service dubbed 'Lingo'. Designed to leverage Primus international data network to provide a cost-effective retail voice service, Lingo offered U.S. customers unlimited calling in the U.S., Canada and Western Europe for only $19.95 per month.

Despite 6% revenue growth in Primus' new services, broadband and VOIP, on March 14, 2006, Primus Telecommunications stock was transferred from the NASDAQ National Market to the NASDAQ Capital Market due to the value of the stock dropping below $1.00. This setback, however, did not stop the business from continuing to roll out their own DSLAM network internationally, especially in Australia.

In 2007, Primus Telecom admitted paying more than $22 million to settle a lawsuit alleging illegal or fraudulent transfers of funds. Primus Telecom has also been named as a defendant in additional federal litigation.

As of 2008, the company's stock had dropped more than 99% from its peak in early 2000, amid declining revenue and accelerating losses. According to the company's SEC filings, Primus did not maintain effective internal control over financial reporting as of December 31, 2006, due to the material weakness in the company's internal control over accounting for income taxes.

=== Bankruptcy and recovery (2009-2010) ===
Primus' struggles finally culminated in the company filing for Chapter 11 bankruptcy protection on March 16, 2009.

However, months later, Primus emerged from Chapter 11 on July 1, 2009. The value recovered by shareholders of old common stock (ticker NASDAQ:PRTL) will depend on the company's financial performance over the four years following their emergence from Chapter 11. As a result of the reorganization, Primus's creditors have also become significant shareholders in the organization. Under the terms of the plan of reorganization Primus has reduced its debt by $316 million, or 55%, and will emerge from bankruptcy with approximately $255 million of debt. Additionally, Primus reduced interest payments by approximately 50% and extended certain debt maturities. None of Primus' operating companies in the United States, Australia, Canada, India, Europe, or Brazil were included in the restructuring. The operating units have and will continue to manage and operate their businesses normally.

The newly emerged public company was not listed on any stock exchange until June 23, 2011, when it began trading under the ticker PTGI on the NYSE.

=== Acquisition of Arbinet (2010-2013) ===
As of March 4, 2010, Primus appeared on the recovery track as they reported 2009 net revenue of US$814 million and free cash flow of $27.9 million; revenue increases they claim are partly the result of sales of IP-PBX, data hosting, and other managed services to small and medium enterprises...

On November 11, 2010, Primus announced the acquisition of Arbinet Corporation. A provider of international voice and IP solutions to carriers and service providers globally, Arbinet provides platform intelligence, call routing, and credit management and settlement capabilities. The deal was reportedly worth approximately $28 million in a stock-for-stock transaction, reportedly Arbinet shareholders will own approximately 23% of the combined company and Primus shareholders are expected to own approximately 77% of the combined company.

With more than 1,100 carriers worldwide utilizing the Arbinet network Primus expects the deal to add $300 million a year in revenue to its global wholesale group and deliver cost savings of $3 million to $7 million for each of the first two years.

=== Primus delists from NYSE and name changes (2013-present) ===
On November 8, 2013, Primus's board of directors decided to delist from the NYSE and de-register its common stock saying that the savings that would benefit shareholders and the company outweighed the advantages of continuing as a NYSE listed and a reporting company. Without the annual accounting and legal costs, and administrative burdens associated with SEC reporting obligations and compliance with Sarbenes-Oxley Act, Primus said it would be able to reduce its costs while still maintaining an environment with appropriate financial controls.

On January 7, 2014, HRG Group Inc. purchased a 40.5% stake in Primus. On April 14, 2014, Primus was renamed HC2 Holdings, Inc.

On July 9, 2021, HC2 announced that it would be renamed INNOVATE Corp., stating the new name "reflects the Company’s focus on innovative growth businesses". Despite its parent company's renaming, the broadcasting unit is still known as HC2 Broadcasting.

=== United Kingdom operations ===
Primus had a subsidiary in the United Kingdom. A management buyout of the UK business in 2010 saw this subsidiary separate from Primus Telecom to form New Call Telecom.

=== Broadcast expansion ===
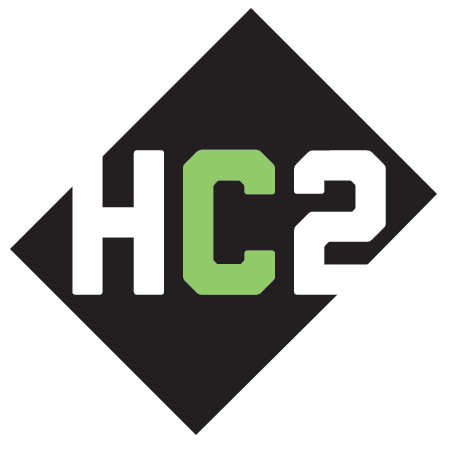
HC2 Holdings logo, in use from April 2014 to July 2021.

HC2 entered into the field of broadcast television ownership in July 2017 with their purchase of a 50 percent stake in DTV America, which owned 50 low-power television (LPTV) stations in 42 markets in the United States; this transaction became an outright purchase by October 2017. Deals to purchase 38 low-power stations from Mako Communications and 14 low-power stations from Three Angels Broadcasting Network, followed in September and October, respectively. By November 2017, HC2 acquired seven stations from OTA Broadcasting that didn't have their spectrum sold during the FCC's 2016 auction, two stations from Abrahantes Communications, 19 stations from Northstar Media, LLC (including two full-power stations) and the Azteca América network from TV Azteca. Seven Azteca América affiliates, including San Francisco market station KEMO-TV, were purchased from Jericho Partners LLC for $411,318 the following month.

The string of purchases continued into 2018, with stations purchased from HERO Broadcasting, Tyche Media LLC, Joseph W Shaffer, Prime Time Partners LLC, Tran Star LLC, Iglesia Manmin Toda La Creacio USA Inc, Dallas De Mujer A Mujer International and the Benns Family, all for a combined $9.67 million. KCEB in Longview, Texas, one of the two remaining stations in London Broadcasting Co.'s portfolio, was purchased in April 2018 for $225,000. Additional stations were purchased by NRJ TV for $9.25 million and One Ministries Inc. for $2.15 million. In June 2018, HC2 purchased stations from KM Communications for $1.85 million, Marion, Illinois–based Tri-State Christian Television (TCT) for $4 million and Estrella Media for $3,325,000. WPVN-CD of Chicago, Illinois was purchased from Polnet Communications for $7 million. Further transactions included WVTT-CD from Woodland Communications LLC for $1.5 million, along with stations from Milachi Media for $1,172,661, CNZ Communications for $1.75 million, and V1 Productions Inc for $503,000.

September 2018 saw the announcement of the purchase of WJFB in Lebanon, Tennessee from Radiant Life Ministries for $5.75 million. HC2 also purchased Columbus, Ohio station WDEM-CD from Minority Brands for $850,000. Also in September, a multi-station deal in Puerto Rico was announced with HC2 buying WOST, WQQZ-CD and WWKQ-LD from Corporate Media Consultants Group LLC for $2.85 million. In October, HC2 purchased K20JX-D from Amazing Facts Inc for $800,000.

In May 2019, HC2 Holdings announced they were acquiring a full-power station from Lowcountry Media for $2.6 million. WSCG of Baxley, Georgia serves the Savannah market. The purchase of two low-power stations was announced in June 2019. WBEH-CD of Miami, Florida and WSPF-CD of St. Petersburg, Florida were sold by WPMF Miami LLC for $3.7 million. The sales of these stations would fall through by the end of the year. WSCG and WSPF would later be sold to TCT, while WBEH would later be acquired by the Word of God Fellowship, parent of the Daystar Television Network.

On October 21, 2022, INNOVATE Corp. announced that Azteca América would cease operations on December 31, after 22 years of operation as a competitor to leading Spanish networks Univision and Telemundo. Prior to the announcement, INNOVATE had been selling most of the full-power stations operated by Azteca América, and began notifying affiliates and advertising partners of the network's planned closure.

== See also ==
- iPrimus
- Primus Canada
