= WXLV-TV =

Television station in Winston-Salem, North Carolina

- Winston-Salem–Greensboro–; High Point, North Carolina; United States
- City: Winston-Salem, North Carolina
- Channels: Digital: 29 (UHF); Virtual: 45
- Branding: ABC 45

Programming
- Affiliations: 45.1: ABC; for others, see § Subchannels

Ownership
- Owner: Sinclair Broadcast Group; (WXLV Licensee, LLC)
- Sister stations: WMYV

History
- First air date: September 22, 1979
- Former call signs: WGNN-TV (1979–1980); WJTM-TV (1980–1984); WNRW (1984–1995)
- Former channel numbers: Analog: 45 (UHF, 1979–2009)
- Former affiliations: Independent (1979–1986); Fox (1986–1995); UPN (secondary, 1995–1996)
- Call sign meaning: XLV = Roman numeral 45

Technical information
- Licensing authority: FCC
- Facility ID: 414
- ERP: 990 kW
- HAAT: 576 m (1,890 ft)
- Transmitter coordinates: 35°52′2.6″N 79°49′25.4″W

Links
- Public license information: Public file; LMS
- Website: abc45.com

WXLV-TV (channel 45) is a television station licensed to Winston-Salem, North Carolina, United States, serving as the ABC affiliate for the Piedmont Triad region. It is owned by Sinclair Broadcast Group alongside WMYV (channel 48), an independent station with MyNetworkTV. The two stations share studios on Myer Lee Drive (along US 421) in Winston-Salem; WXLV-TV's transmitter is located in Randleman (along I-73/US 220).

Channel 45 went on the air in 1979 as WGNN-TV, a Christian-oriented TV station. It was sold to Television Corporation Stations—later renamed TVX Broadcast Group—in 1980 and changed its call sign to WJTM-TV, becoming the Triad's first general-entertainment independent station. After a gunman killed the general sales manager in 1984, TVX renamed the station WNRW, incorporating his initials. WNRW became the market's first Fox affiliate in 1986; TVX then sold it to Act III Broadcasting in 1986 in order to acquire a station in the adjacent Raleigh market. Act III combined the station's schedule and programming with Greensboro independent WGGT in 1991, creating a simulcast.

In 1995, as a result of regional ABC affiliate WGHP switching to Fox, channel 45 became an ABC affiliate under new WXLV call letters and began broadcasting local news programming. It also picked up a secondary affiliation with UPN, which became channel 48's primary programming when the simulcast was split the next year. Sinclair acquired WXLV in 1998. The station's local newscasts failed to make headway against the established stations in the Triad. Sinclair shuttered the local news department in January 2002. Since then, Sinclair has implemented smaller-scale news programs for the station, first as part of the News Central service, then with cable news channel News 14 Carolina (later Spectrum News North Carolina) and since 2021 with local reporters and anchors at a Sinclair station in Texas.

== As an independent station and Fox affiliate ==
=== WGNN-TV and WJTM-TV: Establishment ===
In February 1976, Good News TV Network filed with the Federal Communications Commission (FCC) for a construction permit to build a new commercial TV station in Winston-Salem, which the commission granted in August 1977. Good News TV had been formed after the local Calvary Baptist Church voted to set aside $139,000 (equivalent to $786,000 in 2025) for the construction of the proposed outlet; one of the directors was Stuart Epperson, the founder of Salem Communications. The station was originally proposed to operate on a non-commercial basis with Christian religious programs and some secular classic films, though it eventually decided to accept some commercial advertising. Delays in equipment delivery and installation pushed the station's start from 1978 back into 1979; the station also had to settle a payment dispute with an equipment installer. From a transmitter on the Wachovia Building in Winston-Salem and studios on its top floor, program testing for WGNN-TV began on September 22, 1979.

Shortly before going on air, Good News TV Network had sold the construction permit for the station to a subsidiary of Piece Goods Stores, a chain of fabric stores in Winston-Salem. Piece Goods had stepped in when Good News TV Network ran out of cash to put the station on the air. The proprietors of Piece Goods, twin brothers Dudley and John Simms, also appeared on air giving editorials that were strongly conservative in character. The station's programming turned out to be more middle-of-the-road than the religion-heavy, family-friendly lineup once advertised, including films with sexual mentions and violence, as the Simms brothers sought to make channel 45 profitable. However, the station never attracted more than one percent of the audience.

In 1980, Piece Goods sold 85 percent of WGNN-TV and operational control to the Television Corporation of North Carolina, a company controlled by investors from the Hampton Roads area of Virginia. After WTVZ in Norfolk, it was the second station to be owned by Television Corporation Stations (abbreviated TVX and later changed to TVX Broadcast Group). The Simms brothers disappeared from the airwaves, while TVX announced it would seek better programming and build a more powerful transmitter facility on Sauratown Mountain. The call letters were changed to WJTM-TV (Note: For John Trinder and Tim McDonald, the executive vice president and president of TVX. After WJTM-TV became WNRW, TVX built KJTM-TV in Pine Bluff, Arkansas, in 1986.) on October 20, 1980, as TVX sought to bring to Winston-Salem the programming style that had made WTVZ immediately competitive in Norfolk. Immediately, and even before the transmitter move to Sauratown in April 1981, ratings ticked up slightly; at the same time, the studios moved to their present site. Even as TVX took over, Piece Goods found itself facing lawsuits for debts the station had owed to a bank prior to the sale.

=== 1984 hostage situation and call sign change to WNRW ===
On June 5, 1984, 32-year-old Ronnell Leverne Jackson drove to the studios of WJTM-TV in Winston-Salem. He fatally shot 48-year-old William Norbert Rismiller, the station's general sales manager, then kidnapped a secretary and took her to his great-aunt's house, where he lived. Having previously made an unsuccessful demand of the station, the hostage-taker agreed to surrender if Winston-Salem station WXII-TV apologized to him. Jackson believed that the two stations and the Christian television program The 700 Club, which they aired, were spying on him through his TV set. It was found out that the home was subscribed to cable television, and the cable system coordinated with WXII to have their personnel record a false apology, which was then played on tape over WXII's channel confined to the home's neighborhood node, resulting in the release of the secretary after more than six hours. Two days after the murder, TVX applied to change WJTM-TV's call sign to WNRW (William Norbert Rismiller, Winston-Salem), which became effective on June 25 and was accompanied by memorial advertising in such publications as Broadcasting. It also increased security at the station.

=== Act III ownership and Fox affiliation ===
TVX announced in August 1985 that it would acquire WLFL, an independent station in Raleigh, and that it expected to have to sell the smaller-market WNRW to complete the purchase, as the two stations had overlapping signals; FCC rules of the time generally prohibited ownership of stations that shared a portion of their coverage areas. The FCC approved the WLFL transaction in February 1986 and gave TVX 12 months to divest itself of WNRW. In November, TVX filed with the FCC to sell the station for $11 million (equivalent to $32 million in 2025) to a new broadcasting group, Act III Broadcasting, owned by television producer Norman Lear. During 1986, WNRW also became the market's first Fox affiliate when the network launched on October 9, 1986.

As an independent station in the Triad, WNRW was not alone. In 1981, WGGT had reactivated channel 48 from Greensboro. However, beginning at the end of 1986, that station began to fight through a years-long bankruptcy proceeding, burdened by expensive purchases of syndicated programming. It did not emerge from bankruptcy until July 1991; two months later, in September, WNRW and WGGT signed an agreement to simulcast almost all of the broadcast day, a combination billed as a "super station". WNRW–WGGT also became a secondary affiliate of UPN in January 1995.

== WXLV-TV: ABC affiliate ==
=== Switch to ABC and news launch ===
On May 23, 1994, as part of a deal between Fox and New World Communications, it was announced that High Point-based ABC affiliate WGHP (channel 8) would change from ABC to Fox. The deal left WNRW–WGGT as a Fox affiliate with an uncertain future once the network moved and ABC without an affiliate in the Triad. In the meantime, during the first season of the NFL on Fox, the station took the step of allowing fans to vote by telephone on which NFC football game it would telecast each week, a year before the Carolina Panthers first took the field. This was particularly unusual because Fox assigned games to stations; when the Greensboro News & Record interviewed the director of media relations for Fox Sports, he reacted, "They're doing what?"

The timing of the affiliation switch in the Triad market was mostly driven by the station ownership juggling that New World had to conduct with WGHP. With 15 stations under option, New World was three stations over the 12-station limit then in force. In February 1995, WGHP finally gave ABC its six months' notice of its plan to disaffiliate from the network, with WNRW–WGGT immediately earmarked as the new ABC affiliate in the market.

The arrival of ABC to channels 45 and 48 came with plans to start a local newsroom. In May 1995, the station hired its first news director, and a total of 33 people—mostly from out of the market, with the notable exception of sportscaster Johnny Phelps—were hired to produce and present the station's newscasts. As channel 45 staffed up its newsroom, the station was sold. In June, Act III Broadcasting merged with ABRY Broadcast Partners; the firm named Dan Sullivan, president of the TV division of Clear Channel Communications, to run Sullivan Broadcasting, a joint venture with ABRY to manage the former Act III portfolio.

Eleven years after the murder of William Rismiller, the station also sought to change its call letters in order to establish a new identity for the station as an ABC affiliate. After discussions with Rismiller's widow, the station announced it would change its call sign to WXLV-TV on September 3, 1995, the date it would become an ABC affiliate; simultaneously, plans were announced to establish a scholarship in his name and dedicate the newsroom in his memory. To obtain permission to share the WXLV call sign from its existing user, the FM radio station at Lehigh Carbon Community College in Pennsylvania, it donated a used audio board.

Founding news director Chris Huston promised a focus on regional coverage and issues, hoping to leave aside a perceived focus on Winston-Salem, Greensboro, or High Point. However, despite ABC's strong national standing, viewers did not flock to WXLV's new 6 a.m., 6 p.m., and 11 p.m. local newscasts. Where WFMY-TV and WXII drew 28 and 25 percent of the news audience at 11, WXLV attracted just 5 percent. An 11:30 a.m. newscast was tested but failed to draw ratings and was canceled after 13 weeks.

After five years, the simulcast of channels 45 and 48 was unwound on September 1, 1996, when channel 48 regained separate programming as full-time UPN affiliate WUPN.

=== Sinclair acquisition; news department closure ===
In 1998, Sinclair Broadcast Group bought Sullivan Broadcasting; it also assumed Sullivan's local marketing agreement to program WUPN on behalf of its owner, Mission Broadcasting. Sinclair initially invested in the WXLV news operation. To save money, WXLV had discontinued its morning newscast in March 1997. After the sale to Sinclair, the company restored the morning news and bought new equipment for the station. New lead-in The Jerry Springer Show beat the other three stations' 5 p.m. newscasts and also helped the station lift its 6 p.m. news ratings slightly.

However, as the station continued to make little progress at challenging the existing stations in the ratings, Sinclair cut back in the newsroom. In November 2000, the station discontinued its morning and weekend newscasts and laid off 10 full-time employees in hopes of focusing attention on its 6 and 11 p.m. broadcasts. A new news set and two new vehicles were acquired during the course of 2001, and WXLV-TV also hoped to move from Pilot Mountain to a site in Greensboro in hopes of adding 25,000 additional viewers. It needed the viewers: the station's 6 p.m. newscast was being outrated by reruns of The Drew Carey Show on WTWB-TV. It was not to be. On January 2, 2002, the station announced that it would air its last newscast on January 11, laying off another 35 employees. General manager Will Davis noted that the news department had not turned a profit in 2001 due to a soft economy and its low ratings.

=== News Central ===
While a full-scale news department was scrapped, a new corporate initiative at Sinclair put the restoration of news programming to its Triad stations on the table before 2002 had concluded. The company launched News Central, a hybrid national-local news service designed to service Sinclair's stations that were not producing news. In July 2003, WUPN debuted its News Central newscast; as with others of its type, the newscasts combined local news coverage read by anchors in Winston-Salem with national news and weather from Sinclair's corporate headquarters in Hunt Valley, Maryland. In January 2004, a second News Central newscast debuted, this time an 11 p.m. broadcast for WXLV. The newscasts aired until August 10, 2005, when the newsroom was shut down and 22 people lost their jobs. At 10 p.m., the WUPN newscast attracted two percent of the audience compared with 15 percent viewing WGHP; the 11 p.m. newscast also attracted two percent of the audience, while 19 percent watched WXII and 16 percent watched WFMY.

=== News 14 Carolina/Time Warner Cable/Spectrum News on ABC 45 ===
In February 2011, Sinclair resolved a retransmission consent dispute with Time Warner Cable (TWC) covering 28 stations in 17 markets, including WXLV-TV and WMYV; the group's carriage contract had lapsed, though no stations were temporarily removed. As part of the multiyear agreement, News 14 Carolina, Time Warner Cable's local news channel, would begin producing 6:30 a.m. and 6 and 11 p.m. local newscasts for WXLV-TV beginning in 2012. The goal for the News 14 broadcasts, which were produced in Raleigh with Triad-area reporters and weather and sports from Charlotte, was to provide news programming for channel 45 while advertising the cable news service to non-Time Warner subscribers. News 14 Carolina was renamed Time Warner Cable News North Carolina in 2013 and Spectrum News North Carolina in 2016.

During this time, the future ownership of WXLV came into question. On May 8, 2017, Sinclair entered into an agreement to acquire WGHP owner Tribune Media. It intended to keep WGHP and WMYV, selling WXLV-TV and eight other stations to Standard Media Group. The transaction was designated in July 2018 for hearing by an FCC administrative law judge, and Tribune moved to terminate the deal the next month.

=== Return of in-house newscasts ===
In anticipation of taking news production in house, the Spectrum News newscast ceased airing in 2019. Sinclair announced the return of local news to WXLV to air weeknights at 6 and 11 p.m. in January 2021. The newscasts are produced out of San Antonio sister station KABB and featured KABB anchor Camilla Rambaldi until her departure from Sinclair in January 2024.

== Technical information ==
=== Subchannels ===
WXLV-TV's transmitter is located in Randleman (along I-73/US 220). The station's signal is multiplexed:

Subchannels of WXLV-TV
Subchannel	Res.	Short name	Programming
45.1	720p	WXLV HD	ABC
45.2	480i	ROAR	Roar
45.3	480i	CHARGE	Charge!
45.4	480i	TheNest	The Nest
48.1	720p	WMYV	WMYV (Independent with MyNetworkTV)

Broadcast on behalf of another station

WXLV-TV and WMYV were the first stations in the market to convert to digital-only broadcast transmissions, shutting down on February 17, 2009. The station's digital signal remained on its pre-transition UHF channel 29, using virtual channel 45.
