= Attempted acquisition of Tribune Media by Sinclair Broadcast Group =

Failed 2017 business transaction

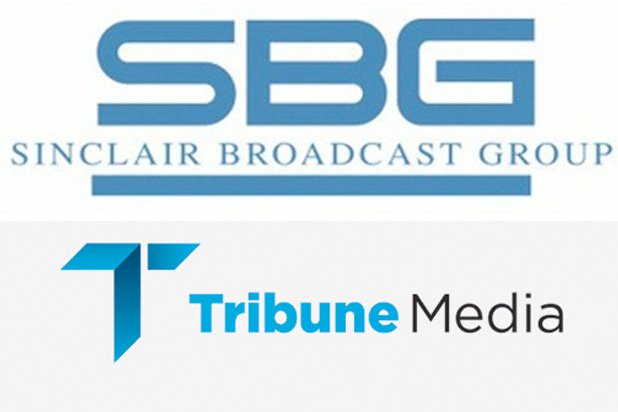
- Initiator: Sinclair Broadcast Group
- Target: Tribune Media
- Type: Full acquisition
- Cost: US$3.9 billion
- Initiated: May 8, 2017
- Canceled: August 9, 2018

The attempted acquisition of Tribune Media by Sinclair Broadcast Group was a proposed broadcast media transaction between Sinclair Broadcast Group and Tribune Media in the United States. Formally announced on May 8, 2017, the $3.9 billion deal would have resulted in Sinclair owning—or having operational control over—stations available in 72% of all households with a television set in the United States.

The deal received criticism from multiple special interest groups and Democratic and Republican politicians who felt that the deal could give Sinclair an effective oligopoly on television broadcasting. Sinclair's prior track record of running public affairs shows and commentary segments in local newscasts among their station group supportive of conservative platforms induced concern over possible imperiled editorial independence among the Tribune stations, with said programming potentially used by Sinclair for favoritism of Republican presidential and congressional candidates in swing states. Federal Communications Commission (FCC) chairman Ajit Pai also encountered backlash over the deal; prior to the merger announcement, Pai reversed several decades-old policies pertaining to broadcast ownership—along with policies implemented by prior chairman Tom Wheeler—leading some to speculate that Pai instituted those changes to benefit Sinclair.

The purchase attempt was ultimately terminated by Tribune Media on August 9, 2018, after emerging scrutiny over proposed divestitures by Sinclair, prompting the FCC to put the deal up for review by an administrative law judge and Pai to publicly reject it. Several months after the deal's termination, Tribune Media was successfully acquired by Nexstar Media Group.

This unsuccessful acquisition occurred concurrently with two successful major media mergers: The Walt Disney Company's acquisition of 21st Century Fox and AT&T's purchase of Time Warner.

== Background ==
On February 29, 2016, Tribune announced that it would review various "strategic alternatives" to increase the company's value to shareholders, which include a possible sale of the entire company and/or select assets, or the formation of programming alliances or strategic partnerships with other companies, due to the decrease in its stock price since the Tribune Publishing spin-off and a $385 million revenue write-down for the 2015 fiscal year, partly due to original scripted programming expenditures for WGN America since it converted the cable network from a superstation in 2014.

On March 1, 2017, reports surfaced that Sinclair Broadcast Group was in discussions to acquire Tribune Media, which was approached by Sinclair management about a possible merger deal in late February. Any deal would have been forged pending FCC review of the UHF discount, a rule enacted by the agency in 1985 with the intent of encouraging ownership of UHF television stations by subtracting their total market coverage by 50% of their overall signal distribution, which had been eliminated in a 3–2 vote led by former FCC chairman Tom Wheeler in September 2016 because of its obsolescence on technological grounds. (UHF stations transmitting over the ATSC digital format have improved signal reception compared to those which broadcast over the NTSC analog standard prior to the 2009 analog-to-digital transition for full-power television stations.) Such a deal would complement Sinclair, as it only had an 11% market overlap with Tribune and required minimum divestment of broadcasting assets; additionally, Sinclair would expand its reach within the top-10 markets, which currently consist of two television properties in Washington, D.C.: one television station, ABC affiliate WJLA-TV (channel 7), and its associated 24-hour cable news channel, NewsChannel 8 (now WJLA 24/7 News). Reports later stated that Sinclair was offering to buy Tribune at a per-share price in the high $30s.

The reports of Sinclair's interest in acquiring Tribune led several unnamed station owners – which also inquired about purchasing some or all of Tribune's assets outright or through a consortium – as well as leading Tribune shareholder Starboard Value to approach 21st Century Fox about taking options to thwart the deal as a defensive measure; the major impetus was that a combination of Sinclair (which is already the largest Fox affiliate operator by station count, with 54 primary and subchannel-only affiliates) and Tribune (the network's largest affiliate operator by total market reach, as its 14 Fox stations are concentrated in top-50 markets) would potentially result in Sinclair obtaining leverage over 21st Century Fox in reverse compensation negotiations for its Fox- and MyNetworkTV-affiliated stations (the 68 Fox affiliates that the two companies own, in particular, cover a combined 28% of the U.S.). These reports were confirmed on May 8, when Sinclair announced that it would acquire Tribune for $3.9 billion, along with the assumption of Tribune's $2.7 billion debt load; it beat Irving, Texas-based broadcaster Nexstar Media Group, which at the time was not willing to make a higher bid closer to Tribune's appraisal price, for the stations.

== Assets that would have been acquired ==
Had the merger been successful, Sinclair would have acquired the majority of the 42 television stations owned and/or operated by Tribune Broadcasting and their associated digital properties, along with two websites not associated with any television stations. Tribune has stations in the five largest media markets – CW affiliate WPIX (channel 11) in New York City, CW affiliate KTLA (channel 5) in Los Angeles, independent station WGN-TV (channel 9) in Chicago, MyNetworkTV affiliate WPHL-TV (channel 17) in Philadelphia, and CW affiliate KDAF (channel 33) in Dallas–Fort Worth in order from #1 through #5 – adding to Sinclair's existing station property in a Top 10 market, WJLA-TV (Washington, D.C./Hagerstown), which would have been supplanted as the largest market in which Sinclair owned a station (Sinclair would also have gained a duopoly in D.C. with the acquisition of CW affiliate WDCW). The two websites that were to have been acquired by Sinclair were entertainment news and television listings service Screener (also known as Zap2It) and its subsidiary website TV by the Numbers. On the radio side, Sinclair would also have acquired ownership of WGN (720 AM) in Chicago, which was Tribune's lone radio property.

Also acquired would have been the following assets associated with WGN-TV:

- WGN America – a cable-satellite television network that formerly served as the superstation feed of WGN-TV from November 1978 until December 2014
- Antenna TV – a digital multicast network focusing on classic television sitcoms
- Chicagoland Television (CLTV) – a regional cable news channel founded by Tribune in January 1993 and shares resources with the WGN-TV news department
- Tribune (FN) Cable Ventures Inc. – an umbrella cable television network unit

The following equity stakes would also have been acquired by Sinclair:

- A 50 percent stake in This TV (co-owned with MGM Holdings)
- A 30 percent stake in each of the Food Network and Cooking Channel (majority owned by Discovery, Inc.)

With the purchase of Tribune, speculation arose about how Sinclair would utilize WGN America, which was in the process of shifting away from scripted content at the time of the purchase announcement. Sinclair CEO Christopher Ripley stated that it would de-emphasize high-end scripted series from WGN America's programming slate (an effort undertaken by Tribune beginning in 2015, following its reformatting of the network from serving as the superstation feed of WGN-TV into a conventional entertainment-based basic cable channel devoid of WGN-TV's news and sports programming); Ripley cited that the network's original programming budget was unjustified based on the channel's ratings (while not among the top 25 highest-rated cable networks, WGN America's viewership had gradually increased since the introduction of original scripted series, posting its highest monthly ratings in March 2017, during which it total viewership averaged 446,000 viewers and viewership among adults ages 25 to 54 totaled at 157,000).

Media analysts revived speculation tracing to the group's January 2016 purchase of Tennis Channel that Sinclair would launch a conservative-leaning cable news rival to Fox News, Newsmax TV and One America News Network (OANN) to suggest that Sinclair would use the network's existing wide national reach to launch such an effort over WGN's existing transponder and channel space. However, Variety reporter Cynthia Littleton noted in a May 8, 2017, article that launching a national news venture would create undue financial risk by adding further debt to that Sinclair had accrued since it began its spate of station purchases with the 2011 acquisition of Four Points Media Group (estimated at $3.268 billion as of March 31, 2017) as well as the debt it would have assumed through the Tribune deal. Former professional wrestling executive Eric Bischoff also posited during a Q&A session on his official Periscope account on March 14, 2018, that the Sinclair-Tribune deal would allow the former to utilize WGN America to expand the reach of Ring of Honor – which has produced a weekly program, Ring of Honor Wrestling, that has been syndicated to the group's television stations since shortly after Sinclair bought the wrestling promotion in 2011 – in a manner similar to how the Turner Broadcasting System utilized World Championship Wrestling (WCW) and its predecessors (including Jim Crockett Promotions and Georgia Championship Wrestling) from the 1970s until the early 2000s through TBS and TNT. Had the acquisition gone through and the promotion moved its broadcasts to the network, Ring of Honor Wrestling would have marked WGN America's first foray into professional wrestling since WWE Superstars left the network in 2011.

Tribune Media's former newspaper division, then called Tronc (Tribune Online Content; the company was renamed to its former Tribune Publishing moniker in November 2018), would not have been part of the merger as it was spun off from Tribune in August 2014. Many Tronc-owned newspapers posted disclaimers that they were no longer operated as part of the former Tribune parent company when covering the Sinclair–Tribune merger, including within articles that had originally been written by the Associated Press and Reuters and syndicated to those publications.

=== Proposed divestitures and sales ===
Although Sinclair intended to acquire all of Tribune's television stations, in order to comply with FCC ownership regulations forbidding either common ownership of two of the four highest-rated stations or more than two stations in the same market as well as to comply with national ownership caps, Sinclair planned to flip 22 of the stations – fifteen owned by Tribune and seven stations owned and/or operated by Sinclair – to other buyers (although it would have ultimately retained control of stations in top-10 markets). Prior to its referral to an administrative law judge, the divestitures were reduced to 18 stations, with Sinclair choosing to rescind proposals to sell four television stations located in top-10 markets to third-party entities and instead directly acquire them.

==== Stations marked for divestiture ====
Sinclair proposed station divestitures to the following entities to ensure compliance with local and national ownership restrictions: († - owned by Sinclair)

- To Cunningham Broadcasting
  - WPIX (channel 11), New York City, New York – affiliated with The CW
  - KDAF (channel 33), Dallas–Fort Worth, Texas – affiliated with The CW
  - KIAH (channel 39), Houston, Texas – affiliated with The CW

Cunningham Broadcasting acts as an effective subsidiary of Sinclair Broadcast Group, as its shareholding structure consists of trusts controlled by the estate of Carolyn C. Smith, who was the wife of Sinclair's founder Julian Sinclair Smith, in the name of Julian's four sons, all of whom (including current Sinclair executive chairman David D. Smith) are also the majority owners of Sinclair.

- To WGN-TV, LLC
  - WGN-TV (channel 9), Chicago, Illinois – then-operated as an independent station
- To Fox Television Stations
  - KCPQ (channel 13), Seattle, Washington – affiliated with Fox
  - KDVR (channel 31), Denver, Colorado – affiliated with Fox
  - KSTU (channel 13), Salt Lake City, Utah – affiliated with Fox
  - KSWB-TV (channel 69), San Diego, California – affiliated with Fox
  - KTXL (channel 40), Sacramento, California – affiliated with Fox
  - WJW (channel 8), Cleveland, Ohio – affiliated with Fox
  - WSFL-TV (channel 39), Miami, Florida – then-affiliated with The CW

The purchase of WSFL raised the specter that Fox planned to convert it into an owned-and-operated station of the Fox Broadcasting Company to replace Sunbeam Television flagship station WSVN (channel 7), which had been serving as the network's Miami affiliate since January 1, 1989. (KCPQ would eventually be acquired by Fox in a separate transaction.)

- To Howard Stirk Holdings
  - KAUT-TV (channel 43), Oklahoma City, Oklahoma – then-operated as an independent station
  - KMYU (channel 12), St. George, Utah – affiliated with MyNetworkTV†
  - KUNS-TV (channel 51), Bellevue, Washington – then-affiliated with Univision†

Howard Stirk Holdings acts as a partner company to Sinclair and is owned and controlled by Armstrong Williams, an African-American conservative political commentator who hosts The Right Side with Armstrong Williams, a political discussion program syndicated to Sinclair-operated and Stirk-owned stations. The company was originally formed in April 2013 to acquire NBC affiliate WEYI-TV (channel 25) in Flint, Michigan and CW affiliate WWMB (channel 21) in Myrtle Beach, South Carolina as part of its purchase of Barrington Broadcasting, and, in December 2014, began operating stations independently of Sinclair – located in Tuscaloosa and Anniston, Alabama (WCFT [now WSES] and WJSU-TV [now WGWW]) and Charleston, South Carolina (WCIV [now WGWG]), all three of which were formerly ABC affiliates and became affiliated with digital multicast-originated networks upon coming under the purview of Howard Stirk – through spin-offs made as part of that group's purchase of Allbritton Communications.

As with the Cunningham sales, Sinclair intended to hold operational control of the three stations through shared services agreements.

- To Meredith Corporation
  - KPLR-TV (channel 11), St. Louis, Missouri – affiliated with The CW
- To Standard Media
  - KDSM-TV (channel 17), Des Moines, Iowa – affiliated with Fox†
  - KOKH-TV (channel 25), Oklahoma City, Oklahoma – affiliated with Fox†
  - WPMT (channel 43), York, Pennsylvania – affiliated with Fox
  - WRLH-TV (channel 35), Richmond, Virginia – affiliated with Fox†
  - WQMY (channel 53), Williamsport, Pennsylvania – affiliated with MyNetworkTV
  - WXLV-TV (channel 45), Greensboro, North Carolina – affiliated with ABC†
  - WXMI (channel 17), Grand Rapids, Michigan – affiliated with Fox

Also to have been transferred to Standard Media as part of the Standard General agreement would be the local marketing agreements to Fox affiliate WOLF-TV (channel 56) in Hazleton and CW affiliate WSWB (channel 38) in Scranton, Pennsylvania, which were locally owned by New Age Media and operated alongside Sinclair-owned WQMY. (All three stations serve the Scranton–Wilkes-Barre television market.)

==== Overview of proposed divestitures ====
To comply with Department of Justice antitrust and FCC ownership regulations (assuming a draft of the latter agency's media ownership review was unable to receive Congressional approval), Sinclair Broadcast Group was expected to likely be required to sell stations owned by either Tribune or Sinclair in up to twelve markets in order to address ownership conflicts associated with the Tribune acquisition. The most significant conflicts exist in Seattle, Salt Lake City, Oklahoma City, Harrisburg–Lancaster–Lebanon–York and Grand Rapids–Kalamazoo–Battle Creek, where Sinclair and Tribune each have two stations that rank among the four highest-rated in terms of total viewership and maintain news departments. Other divestitures or signal reshuffling were likely to be required in St. Louis, Portland, Oregon, Norfolk/Virginia Beach/Hampton, Greensboro/Winston-Salem/High Point, Richmond, Scranton/Wilkes-Barre and Des Moines where ownership regulations would be violated (either because Sinclair already had or would have operational stewardship of three or more stations, or just two stations with too few independent station owners to permit a duopoly). Presumptive of the cap not being raised any further, Sinclair would also have to divest certain stations in non-conflict markets that would put its total reach over the current 39% coverage limit on national station ownership. (The enlarged group would effectively cover nearly 72% of the U.S., but would still reach over 45% coverage even with the UHF discount factored in.) Sinclair CEO Christopher Ripley stated that the company would consider full divestitures of any conflict stations to independent buyers (stating the markets where station divestitures were likeliest to occur, to comply with antitrust regulations on advertising share, are in Seattle, Scranton/Wilkes-Barre and Salt Lake City).

On August 2, 2017, reports surfaced that Fox Television Stations was in talks with Ion Media to create a joint venture that would own the respective stations of both groups. The partnership was said to include plans to shift Fox network affiliations from Sinclair stations to Ion-owned stations, such as those in which affiliation agreements were set to expire by the end of 2017. Fox was reportedly concerned about Sinclair's growing influence, and that its conservative syndicated news inserts would harm its cable news channel, Fox News. It had been suggested that the proposed partnership was meant to place pressure on Sinclair to divest some of the Fox stations owned by Sinclair and (especially) Tribune, because of the market share that it would have if the deal were to be consummated. The Ion stations have historically had little local staff, infrastructure, or programming, including local news (having terminated news share agreements that allowed them to rebroadcast newscasts from major network affiliates in their respective markets in July 2005 upon the rebranding of the former Pax TV to i: Independent Television, the brand preceded the network's January 2007 relaunch as Ion Television), leading an analyst to consider the plan unfeasible. Sinclair's stock prices slipped following the news. On October 19, 2017, Tribune Media shareholders approved the $3.9-billion acquisition by Sinclair.

On November 29, 2017, it was reported that Sinclair Broadcast Group – which attempted to convince the Assistant Attorney General of the Department of Justice Antitrust Division, Makan Delrahim, to relax rules pertaining to a broadcast television combination's total advertising share within a media market but was denied in their efforts – was reportedly close to a deal with the U.S. Department of Justice to sell thirteen unspecified television stations (although Sinclair had attempted to gain DOJ permission to divest only ten stations) as a condition of the approval for its $3.9 billion acquisition of Tribune Media. Nexstar Media Group, Tegna Inc. and the Meredith Corporation were among the groups that reportedly made offers to acquire the divested outlets. Fox Television Stations (FTS) also was reported to have entered into negotiations to acquire between six and ten stations, among those involved in the DOJ consent agreement and/or those already owned by Sinclair or Tribune that are located in markets where neither groups' stations conflict with FCC rules (among them, KCPQ and its MyNetworkTV-affiliated sister KZJO in Seattle, the former of which was earlier sought by Fox in 2014 in a failed attempt to leverage KCPQ's Fox affiliation in order to convince Tribune into selling as part of the group's attempt to expand its reach in markets with NFL franchises based in the National Football Conference, to which the Fox network holds national broadcast television rights).

On December 6, 2017, reports stated that FTS would purchase up to 10 Fox-affiliated stations from Sinclair (all in NFL markets), in order to allow the latter to reduce the acquisition's effects on its reach under national ownership cap limits. The deal would have purportedly included Tribune's Seattle duopoly of Fox affiliate KCPQ and MyNetworkTV affiliate KZJO, since Sinclair already owns ABC affiliate KOMO-TV (channel 4) and then-Univision affiliate KUNS-TV. Other Fox affiliates owned by either Sinclair or Tribune involving NFL markets include former O&Os in Cleveland (WJW), Denver (KDVR), Kansas City (WDAF-TV, channel 4) and Milwaukee (WITI, channel 6) as well as stations in Baltimore (WBFF, channel 45), Buffalo (WUTV, channel 29), Green Bay (WLUK-TV, channel 11), Indianapolis (WXIN, channel 59), Nashville (WZTV, channel 17) and Pittsburgh (WPGH-TV, channel 53). Of these markets, only Milwaukee had overlapping properties operated by both Sinclair and Tribune that were in conflict with FCC regulations, as Sinclair owned CW affiliate WVTV (channel 18) and MyNetworkTV affiliate WCGV (channel 24, which had its license terminated and intellectual assets merged into a digital subchannel of WVTV through the sale of its broadcast spectrum through the 2017 spectrum incentive auction); the Baltimore station, being Sinclair's flagship, likely would not have been sold in any event as the nearest Tribune properties to it were in Washington, D.C. (WDCW), Philadelphia (WPHL-TV) and Harrisburg (WPMT). FTS was also reported to be considering exchanging the Orlando duopoly of WOFL (channel 35) and WRBW (channel 65) as well as Ocala semi-satellite WOGX (channel 51) to Sinclair in return. After the Department of Justice approved the Sinclair–Tribune deal, it was reported that Fox would be purchasing KCPQ/KZJO in Seattle, and was at least interested in the Tribune-owned Fox affiliates in Cleveland, Denver, Kansas City, and San Diego (KSWB-TV, channel 69), as well as some of the other aforementioned Fox affiliates owned by Sinclair and Tribune. The then-ongoing acquisition of the 20th Century Fox film and television production units and certain related cable television assets by The Walt Disney Company – which was precluded from acquiring the Fox network and Fox Television Stations as these properties were spun-off into Fox Corporation due to FCC local ownership restrictions as well as a rule barring common ownership of any two of the four major broadcast networks, as Disney already owned ABC and its eight owned-and-operated stations – would reportedly fund the acquisition of stations by Fox.

On February 21, 2018, Sinclair informed the FCC that it would sell CW affiliate WPIX in New York City to Cunningham Broadcasting for a below market-value price of $15 million, receiving an option to acquire WPIX outright. It also announced that it planned to sell off Tribune-owned stations in Chicago (WGN-TV) and San Diego (KSWB-TV), while intending to seek waivers to purchase the Tribune stations in Indianapolis (WXIN and CBS affiliate WTTV [channel 4] as well as its Kokomo-based satellite WTTK [channel 29]), South Central Pennsylvania (WPMT and CBS affiliate WHP-TV [channel 21]) and North Carolina's Piedmont Triad region (WXLV and Fox affiliate WGHP [channel 8]) under relaxed rules that allowed for case-by-case acquisitions of two stations ranked among the top four in terms of overall viewership. Sinclair intended to enter into local marketing agreements to handle programming and advertising sales for WPIX and WGN-TV, and sell off KSWB outright to an independent third-party licensee. Overlapping stations in Seattle, St. Louis, Salt Lake City, Oklahoma City, Grand Rapids, Richmond and Des Moines, Iowa would be sold off to unaffiliated third parties. On February 28, 2018, Tribune announced the sale of WGN-TV to WGN-TV LLC (a limited liability company to have been controlled by Steven Fader, a Baltimore-based automotive executive with close business ties to Sinclair executive chairman Smith) for $60 million, intending to operate it under a master services agreement and receiving an option for Sinclair to buy WGN-TV outright within eight years.

On April 24, 2018, Sinclair filed an amendment to the Tribune acquisition, withdrawing the sale of WPIX to Cunningham to acquire WPIX directly and proposing the sale of 22 other stations to both independent and affiliated third-party companies to comply with FCC and DOJ rules. CW affiliate KPLR-TV in St. Louis would be sold to the Meredith Corporation (owner of CBS affiliate KMOV, channel 4) for $65 million. Cunningham Broadcasting was to have acquired two stations in Dallas (KDAF) and Houston (KIAH) for a combined $63.8 million; while Howard Stirk Holdings was to have acquired Sinclair stations in Seattle (KUNS-TV) and Salt Lake City (KMYU) and a Tribune station in Oklahoma City (KAUT-TV) for a combined $4.95 million; and Standard Media – a broadcast holding company formed by private equity firm Standard General – would have bought seven stations from Sinclair in Oklahoma City (KOKH-TV), Greensboro (WXLV-TV), Richmond (WRLH-TV), Scranton-Wilkes-Barre (WQMY and master services agreements involving sister stations WSWB and WOLF-TV) and Des Moines (KDSM-TV), and two from Tribune in Grand Rapids (WXMI) and Harrisburg (WPMT) in a $441.1-million group deal. In four of the affected markets, Sinclair would have formed new duopolies or virtual triopolies involving existing stations that would have been separated from their existing duopoly partners and Tribune-owned stations in those markets:

- In St. Louis, Sinclair would have directly acquired Tribune-owned Fox affiliate KTVI (channel 2) to form a duopoly with ABC affiliate KDNL-TV (channel 30);
- in Portland, Sinclair would have directly acquired Tribune-owned CW affiliate KRCW-TV (channel 33) to form a duopoly with ABC affiliate KATU (channel 2);
- in Oklahoma City, Sinclair would have directly acquired Tribune-owned NBC affiliate KFOR-TV (channel 4) to form a virtual triopoly involving then-CW affiliate KOCB (channel 34) and KAUT-TV (channel 43), the latter of which Howard Stirk would lease operational rights to Sinclair under a shared services agreement;
- and in Greensboro, Sinclair would have directly acquired Tribune-owned WGHP to form a duopoly with MyNetworkTV affiliate WMYV (channel 48).

On May 9, 2018, Fox Television Stations confirmed that it would acquire Fox affiliates KCPQ in Seattle, KDVR in Denver, WJW in Cleveland, KTXL in Sacramento, KSWB-TV in San Diego and KSTU in Salt Lake City, and CW affiliate WSFL-TV in Miami for $910 million in cash and value stock. In exchange for the seven Tribune-owned Fox affiliates, Sinclair received options to purchase MyNetworkTV owned-and-operated station WPWR-TV (channel 50) in Chicago and Fox owned-and-operated station KTBC (channel 7) in Austin, Texas from Fox Television Stations. (A purchase of KTBC would have resulted in an ownership conflict for Sinclair in Austin as the group already owns CBS affiliate KEYE-TV [channel 42], which both fall within the FCC's top-four market viewership restrictions.)

Amid objections by the Justice Department, Sinclair terminated the planned sale of KPLR to Meredith on May 15. (The termination of the sale likely resulted from similar viewership and advertising market conditions in St. Louis that scuttled a 2013 proposal by the Gannett Company, which spun off its broadcasting unit into Tegna, Inc. in June 2015, in which it planned to sell KMOV's license to Tucker Operating Company LLC upon its acquisition of that station from the Belo Corporation and transfer its operations to Gannett under an LMA with NBC affiliate KSDK [channel 5].) Sinclair disclosed it would instead put KPLR into a divestiture trust administered by Rafamedia LLC (managed by media broker Richard A. Foreman) for sale to an independent third party that would handle operational responsibilities. However, such a sale was ultimately hampered because the owner would have to operate KPLR as a standalone affiliate of The CW (the lowest-rated of the six English language commercial networks, whose affiliates are largely operated as part of duopolies with affiliates of one of the Big Four television networks – ABC, CBS, Fox and NBC – as most CW and MyNetworkTV stations tend to fall outside the "top-four" ratings threshold) and address local programming issues associated with its news operations being integrated with those of KTVI.

== Criticism ==
=== Sinclair ===
The prospect of Sinclair acquiring Tribune Media's television and radio properties was met with consternation among media advocacy groups that were in opposition of the merger and employees with the Tribune stations concerned about the influence the group might have on their news content. A principal issue was the perceived politicized nature of some of the news and opinion segments that Sinclair produces internally and syndicates to its stations for inclusion in their local newscasts (both those produced by the stations directly and those produced under news share or shared services agreements with other Sinclair-operated stations or competing stations in certain markets). Sinclair has been producing syndicated news content for its television stations since January 2003, when it launched News Central, a concept through which it produced long-form national news and sports segments and shorter, localized weather segments originating from the group's Hunt Valley, Maryland headquarters for inclusion within local newscasts on the stations. Continuing after the dissolution of News Central in 2005, the company has also produced commentaries – presented first by Mark Hyman (through the opinion segments The Point and Behind the Headlines) and later by Boris Epshteyn (through his segment Bottom Line with Boris) – that reflect a conservative perspective; the company also produces a segment, Terrorism Alert Desk, which has been criticized for utilizing Islamophobic stereotypes citing past stories that have focused on Muslims with no association with terrorism (such as a 2016 segment centering on a French law prohibiting burkinis from being worn at public beaches within the country).

Further attention to the content in the Sinclair-syndicated news segments was brought about in April 2018, when Deadspin released a compilation of promotions in which anchors from the group's local news departments and certain unaffiliated stations that maintain news share agreements with Sinclair-run stations read a promotional script disseminated by the company that critics noted had echoed talking points long used by many conservatives (including President Donald Trump) and conservative-focused media outlets (including, most prominently, Fox News Channel) accusing the mainstream media of having a liberal slant in and fabricating their coverage, claiming that such an "agenda" is "dangerous to our democracy." (Critics of both mainstream media and the Republican Party in independent media have long criticized statements similar to those made in the promotions for being used as a form of conservative propaganda to delegitimize mainstream media platforms and limit their willingness to report on certain political matters in a factual and objective manner and, in turn, have accused mainstream outlets of being cowed into journalistic neutrality to avoid being perceived as having bias against conservatives.)

These issues – along with the company's past history of producing specials critical of Democratic presidential candidates John Kerry (in 2004) and Barack Obama (planned for 2008, only to be scuttled amid pressure from interest groups that included those who opposed the Tribune purchase) – raised concerns that Sinclair would have the potential of persuading voters to support Republican presidential candidates in key swing states, creating a disadvantage over their Democratic Party competitors. Some of the Tribune markets where Sinclair would have entered through the deal have predominate voter support of Democratic candidates in national and local elections, with the exception of some outlying areas in some of the affected cities that tend to lean conservative. (Some Sinclair stations in liberal-leaning markets, such as ABC affiliate KOMO-TV in Seattle, have opted to put the commentary and Terrorism Alert Desk segments in lower-profile time slots or immediately preceding or following commercial breaks to blend in with commercial spots.) Observers also expressed concern that the expansion of partisan content by Sinclair into new markets could worsen existing distrust of American media organizations to local media, which has maintained higher ratings of trustworthiness among the general public over national media in large part because of their localized focus and tendency to forego political opinion.

Opponents of the deal had pointed out that if approved, the deal would create an oligarchy in the broadcast television industry – through which Sinclair and Nexstar Media Group, which has a station portfolio of similar size and has historically used outsourcing agreements to acquire and operate stations it cannot legally own directly as Sinclair historically has done as well, would run a large share of the local television stations operating in the United States – and may lead to more consolidation, including among the Big Four television networks (ABC, CBS, Fox and NBC) in order to expand their own respective O&O groups, leading to the networks adopting a similar model to their Canadian counterparts in that the majority of their stations are owned-and-operated with only a few affiliates. (Unlike in Canada, which has considerably fewer densely populated areas and media markets than the U.S., such a move would be unfeasible as it would necessitate the piecemeal breakup of station groups based on network affiliation in the majority, if not all, of the 210 American media markets, likely tacking on heavy amounts of debt for the parent companies of all four networks. It would also necessitate the breakup of companies like Sinclair and Nexstar to be able to allow such consolidation even in a downscaled manner.) In addition to Fox purchasing stations as part of the Sinclair–Tribune deal, CBS Corporation CEO Leslie Moonves stated it would purchase more stations if ownership caps were lifted.

The concerns about Sinclair potentially led public interest groups to file petitions to block the FCC reinstatement of the UHF discount in an end-run to stop the merger, as the rule would artificially reduce cap space under national group ownership limits to allow Sinclair to acquire Tribune stations in most of the markets where that group has broadcast properties. On June 1, 2017, the District of Columbia Court of Appeals issued a seven-day administrative stay to the UHF discount rulemaking, in order to allow review of an emergency stay motion filed by The Institute for Public Representation (a coalition of public interest groups comprising Free Press, the United Church of Christ, Media Mobilizing Project, the Prometheus Radio Project, the National Hispanic Media Coalition and Common Cause) on May 15. The coalition argued that the UHF discount was no longer logical from a technical standpoint (as stations that transmit on the UHF band have typically maintained better digital signal quality than those transmitting on VHF, a reversal of the technical issues with both bands during the analog era) and would trigger a wave of mergers and acquisitions in the broadcast television industry that would further reduce diversity in station ownership, with particular disadvantages to the abilities of females and ethnic minorities to acquire local broadcast media. The D.C. Court of Appeals denied the emergency stay motion on June 15, 2017, though it is still subject to a pending court proceeding to appeal the UHF discount implementation.

=== Ajit Pai ===
FCC chairman Ajit Pai's relaxed scrutiny on outsourcing agreements raised concerns by opponents of the deal – most notably by then-House Minority Leader Nancy Pelosi and House Committee on Energy and Commerce ranking member Frank Pallone in a letter they co-authored in advance of the FCC's vote on April 20, 2017, which reinstated the UHF discount – that Sinclair could choose to retain the conflict stations through its partner companies, potentially eliminating an independent news voice in those markets. On October 24, 2017, the FCC Commissioner's Board, in a 3–1 vote passed by the board's conservative majority, eliminated a rule (dating to 1934) that required broadcast station groups to maintain a physical presence in the community of their primary local coverage areas, a move that would help media companies further consolidate their operations and potentially assist Sinclair Broadcast Group's media ambitions. Such a rule also sparked concerns by some interest groups that it would allow Sinclair to outsource news production and personnel to out-of-market stations that would be acquired through the Tribune purchase.

In November 2017, two Democratic members of the U.S. House of Representatives, John Conyers (Mich.) and David Cicilline (R.I.), asked David L. Hunt, the inspector general of the FCC, to investigate whether Pai's legislative actions regarding the relaxation of broadcast ownership rules were biased in favor of Sinclair. The FCC, under Pai, undertook a number of actions that the legislators believe would benefit Sinclair – which has lobbied for such changes for several years – including rolling back certain broadcast television station ownership limitations (including allowing exceptions to duopoly rules that forbid common ownership of two television stations in the same market if both are among the four highest-rated or if such a combination would dilute independent media voices, reinstating a 1985 discount quota on UHF stations repealed two years earlier by Wheeler and his Democratic-led majority, a requirement dating to the FCC's inception for broadcast outlets to maintain office operations within the community of their primary local coverage areas, and removing ownership attribution rules applying to joint sales and shared services agreements).

The issues concerning Pai's legislative efforts also drew attention to efforts by Sinclair to ingratiate itself with the Trump administration in the weeks leading up to Trump's January 2017 inauguration, as analyzed in an August 2017 New York Times article. The article reported that Trump adviser and son-in-law Jared Kushner had arranged an agreement with Sinclair to have reporters from the group's stations interview Trump with the provision that they do not challenge any inaccurate statements, and that Sinclair representatives had met with Pai prior to his expected promotion to agency chief to replace colleague and former FCC Commissioner Tom Wheeler to discuss his deregulatory policies and had given Pai a list of deregulatory actions that they wanted Pai and his soon-to-be conservative FCC majority to enact (including many of the regulations, such as the UHF discount reinstatement and ownership relaxations, that the FCC approved under his leadership). A spokeswoman for Pai said "the request appears to be part of many Democrats' attempt to target one particular company because of its perceived political views... . Any claim that Chairman Pai is modifying the rules now to benefit one particular company is completely baseless."

== Termination of transaction and subsequent history ==
On July 16, 2018, Pai was reported to have "serious concerns" about the merger – particularly regarding whether Sinclair was upfront about its intentions to sell certain conflict properties in its sale applications – and proposed to have the deal be given a hearing before an administrative law judge, which the FCC Commissioner's Board voted to remand the merger review toward on August 9. U.S. President Donald Trump – who employed Sinclair commentator Boris Epshteyn as a foreign policy adviser for his 2016 presidential campaign – spoke in favor of the Sinclair-Tribune deal on July 25, calling the FCC's move to refer the deal to an administrative law judge "so sad and unfair" and "disgraceful" and stating the Sinclair-Tribune merger could provide a "conservative voice for and of the people" over the Comcast's acquisition of NBCUniversal in 2011.

Despite facing the prospect of having to appear before an administrative law judge to defend the deal, Sinclair, on August 8, 2018, during its second-quarter earnings call, announced its intention to attempt to complete the deal, with the parties free to walk away after midnight. However, the following day (August 9), Tribune Media announced that it had terminated the sale agreement with Sinclair, intending to seek other M&A opportunities; it also filed a breach of contract lawsuit against Sinclair in the Delaware Court of Chancery, seeking $1 billion in damages for "repeatedly and willfully breach[ing] its contractual obligations in spectacular fashion". Tribune cited violations of the sale agreement in regards to divestiture of stations, including "belligerent and unnecessarily protracted negations" with the Department of Justice and FCC in an effort to maintain control of stations that it had been advised to divest, and violating conditions barring divestitures from attracting "even the threat" of regulatory scrutiny. If the lawsuit by Tribune was unsuccessful, Tribune would owe Sinclair a $135 million termination fee. Nineteen days later, on August 28, Sinclair responded to the Tribune Media lawsuit by countersuing Tribune for $1 billion in a filing in the same chancery court. With the deal terminated, the sale of stations to Cunningham, Fox, Meredith and Standard Media, which was to have been a sale from Sinclair to those entities (as those all involved Tribune stations) as well as the sales of its stations (and LMAs) to Howard Stirk were also terminated. Fox, however, would eventually trade its Charlotte stations (WJZY and WMYT) to Nexstar Media Group for the former Tribune Broadcasting stations in Seattle (KCPQ and KZJO) and Milwaukee (WITI), with Fox paying $350 million for the three stations and Nexstar paying $45 million for the Charlotte stations, in a deal completed on March 2, 2020. All three stations acquired by Fox were initially intended to be acquired from Sinclair in the aforementioned side deals.

On December 3, 2018, four months after Tribune aborted the Sinclair acquisition, Sinclair rival Nexstar Media Group announced that it would finally seek to acquire Tribune, raising its purchase offer to $4.1 billion (plus $2.3 billion in debt, less debt than Sinclair would have assumed had its deal been successful), totaling the value of the all-cash deal at $6.4 billion and representing a 15.5% premium of Tribune's valuation on the day the transaction was announced. Unlike the Sinclair-Tribune deal, opposition to Nexstar's purchase of Tribune was limited, despite the similar broadcast oligopoly concerns raised in the Sinclair acquisition applying to the Nexstar purchase; Nexstar has also tended to focus around local content with the only nationally syndicated news content produced by the group being more traditional in nature (consisting only of reports filed by its Washington, D.C. news bureau). Nexstar intended to sell off stations in 13 of 15 markets where the two companies' station clusters would conflict; the group announced the sale of 19 Nexstar and Tribune stations to McLean, Virginia-based Tegna Inc. and the Cincinnati-based E. W. Scripps Company on March 20, 2019, in separate deals worth $1.32 billion. (Of the stations sold, only WPIX was not part of an ownership conflict, likely being sold as its transmission over a VHF digital channel assignment, given that the New York City market accounts for 6.44% of all U.S. television households according to Nielsen market tabulations, precludes its applications under the UHF discount and would put Nexstar over the 39% national ownership cap.) Nexstar's purchase of Tribune was valued at a higher price than Sinclair was willing to pay. Despite the Nexstar deal, Tribune and Sinclair continued their respective lawsuits against one another, although a planned hearing by an administrative law judge was cancelled in February 2019 per the grant of a request by Sinclair and the FCC. On August 1, 2019, the Nexstar acquisition of Tribune Media was approved by the United States Department of Justice. The deal was approved by the FCC on September 16, 2019, and was completed on September 19.

Nine months after the unsuccessful bid to buy Tribune, Sinclair announced its intention instead to buy Fox Sports Networks and Fox College Sports from The Walt Disney Company, which was ordered to divest the networks as part of the agreement to allow the acquisition of most Fox assets by Disney, for $10.6 billion. That transaction did not include the YES Network, although in a separate transaction, Sinclair acquired a 20% stake in that channel, being reacquired by team ownership pursuant to a prior right of first refusal.

The lawsuit between Sinclair and Nexstar (having inherited the action from Tribune) was finally settled in early 2020, with Sinclair paying Nexstar $60 million, and transferring ownership of WDKY-TV and the non-license assets of KGBT-TV (including the CBS affiliation to a KVEO-TV subchannel) to Nexstar. On May 7, 2020, Sinclair was fined $48 million to settle investigations related to reports and statements made to the FCC. In August 2020, Sinclair reached a $25 million settlement agreement for its shareholders related to three lawsuits. Of the $25 million, $20.5 million will be paid into a settlement fund.
