= WMYV =

Television station in Greensboro, North Carolina

ATSC 3.0 station
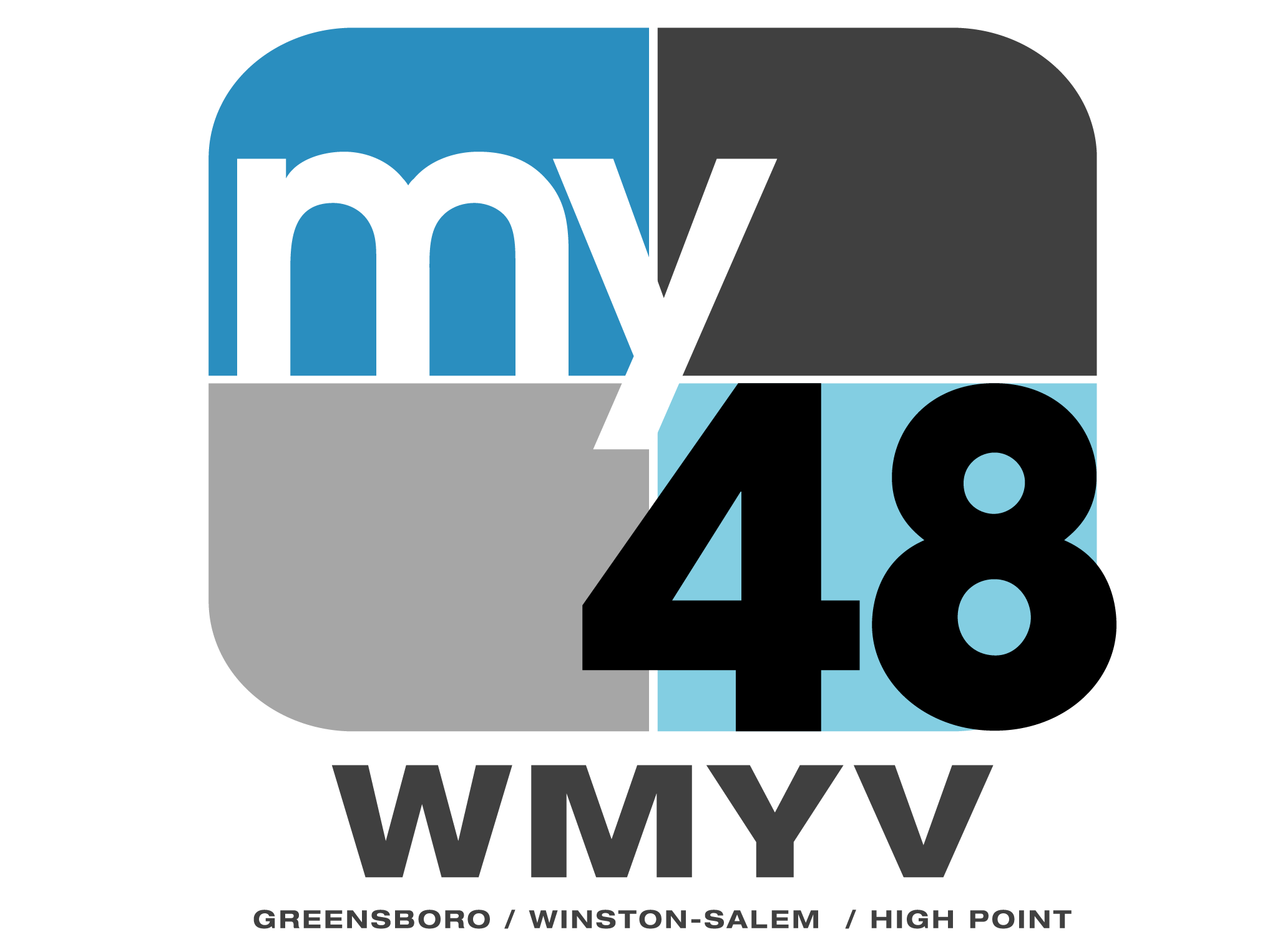
- Greensboro–Winston-Salem–; High Point, North Carolina; United States
- City: Greensboro, North Carolina
- Channels: Digital: 28 (UHF); Virtual: 48
- Branding: My48

Programming
- Affiliations: 48.1: Independent with MyNetworkTV; for others, see § Subchannels

Ownership
- Owner: Sinclair Broadcast Group; (WUPN Licensee, LLC)
- Sister stations: WXLV-TV

History
- Founded: May 1, 1981
- First air date: May 9, 1981
- Former call signs: WGGT (1981–1996); WUPN-TV (1996–2006)
- Former channel numbers: Analog: 48 (UHF, 1981–2009); Digital: 33 (UHF, 2002–2019)
- Former affiliations: Independent (1981–1991); Fox (1991–1995, as satellite of WNRW); ABC (1995–1996, as satellite of WXLV); UPN (secondary 1995–1996, primary 1996–2006)
- Call sign meaning: MyNetworkTV

Technical information
- Licensing authority: FCC
- Facility ID: 25544
- ERP: 800 kW
- HAAT: 574.8 m (1,886 ft)
- Transmitter coordinates: 35°52′2.6″N 79°49′25.4″W

Links
- Public license information: Public file; LMS
- Website: my48.tv

WMYV (channel 48) is a television station licensed to Greensboro, North Carolina, United States, serving the Piedmont Triad region. It is programmed primarily as an independent station, but maintains a secondary affiliation with MyNetworkTV. WMYV is owned by Sinclair Broadcast Group alongside ABC affiliate WXLV-TV (channel 45) and the two stations share studios on Myer Lee Drive (along US 421) in Winston-Salem; WMYV's transmitter is located in Randleman (along I-73/US 220).

== History ==
=== Prior history of UHF channel 48 in the Piedmont Triad ===
The UHF channel 48 allocation in Greensboro was originally occupied by WUBC, an independent station that operated from 1967 until 1970.

=== Early history ===
The current licensed station on channel 48 first signed on the air on May 9, 1981, as WGGT, running a general entertainment format featuring cartoons, classic movies, classic sitcoms, religious programs, and CBS network shows that were preempted by WFMY-TV (channel 2), as well as business news programming from the Financial News Network. It was owned locally by Guilford Broadcasters. The station was initially a strong competitor with the area's other independent station, WJTM-TV (channel 45). However, it took a toll financially.

The Piedmont Triad region was too small at the time to support two independent stations, and there was not enough programming to go around. In addition, WGGT's signal was considerably weaker than rival WJTM's. WGGT fell further behind when TVX Broadcast Group bought WJTM in 1983 and changed its call letters to WNRW. With stronger ownership, WNRW was able to pick clean most of the better programming that was available, and had also beat out WGGT for the Triad's Fox affiliation in 1986. In the mid-1980s, the station aired a program on Sunday mornings called Pet Pals, which showcased a variety of information for people and pets. Co-hosted by Greensboro native Jerry Cunningham, Pet Pals was North Carolina's first weekly program dedicated to pets and became a hit. The most visible on-air personality at WGGT was "Billy Bobb" (created by comedian Dana Lowell), who hosted Billy Bobb's Action Theater and Billy Bobb's Fun Club from January 14, 1987, to December 18, 1991.

WGGT was unable to fill the void left by WNRW joining Fox. Like most early Fox affiliates, WNRW was still essentially programmed as an independent; Fox would not air a full week's worth of programming until 1993. By 1987, WGGT was forced to file for Chapter 11 bankruptcy. It managed to stay on the air, albeit with far more barter programming. The financial woes continued unabated and it was close to filing for Chapter 7 bankruptcy in 1991. At the end of December 1991, Act III Broadcasting, which had bought WNRW in 1988, stepped in and bought WGGT's stronger programming, then merged it onto WNRW's schedule. WGGT began simulcasting WNRW, creating a strong combined signal with over 60% overlap in the market. The two stations became known as the "Piedmont Superstation". At that time, Act III took over management of WGGT as well, and nearly all of its employees were laid off, except for a secretary and a master control technician. The simulcast continued after Act III merged with Abry in 1993.

=== As an ABC/UPN affiliate ===
WNRW and WGGT took a secondary affiliation with UPN when it debuted on January 16, 1995, while retaining its primary Fox affiliation. The two stations then jointly became the market's ABC affiliate that September after longtime ABC station WGHP (channel 8) became a Fox station following its purchase by the network. In 1995, Act III sold all stations to Sullivan Broadcasting, a company backed by ABRY Broadcast Partners for an undisclosed price. In 1998, Sullivan Broadcasting was merged with the Sinclair Broadcast Group, with a local marketing agreement (LMA) with WGGT included in the deal. Guilford Broadcasters then sold WGGT to Mission Broadcasting. However, 90 percent of Mission's stock was owned by David S. Smith, as well as ABRY's own shareholders. In effect, Sullivan/Sinclair owned both stations and now had a duopoly in the Triad in violation of Federal Communications Commission (FCC) rules. Sullivan/Sinclair further circumvented the rules by taking control of WGGT's operations under the LMA with WNRW (now WXLV) as the senior partner. Under the terms of the LMA, Sullivan/Sinclair dropped the simulcast, with UPN programming becoming exclusive to channel 48. WGGT changed its call letters to WUPN-TV after Mission officially took control on June 19. The station was purchased by Sinclair outright in 2001, creating the market's first legal duopoly.

=== As a MyNetworkTV affiliate ===
On January 24, 2006, the Warner Bros. unit of Time Warner and CBS Corporation announced that the two companies would shut down The WB and UPN and combine the networks' respective programming to create a new "fifth" network called The CW. On February 22, 2006, News Corporation announced the launch of a competing "sixth" network called MyNetworkTV, which would be operated by Fox Television Stations and its syndication division Twentieth Television. On March 2, Sinclair announced that all of its UPN and WB affiliates, except for one of its stations in markets where the company owned affiliates of both networks, would join MyNetworkTV. This cleared the way for WTWB-TV to sign an affiliation deal with The CW on March 17, 2006. On June 19, channel 48 changed its call letters to the current WMYV in anticipation of this affiliation switch, which took place on September 5, 2006.

On May 8, 2017, Sinclair entered into an agreement to acquire WGHP owner Tribune Media. It intended to keep WGHP and WMYV, selling WXLV-TV and eight other stations to Standard Media Group. The transaction was designated in July 2018 for hearing by an FCC administrative law judge, and Tribune moved to terminate the deal the next month.

== Newscasts ==
WMYV started its newscasts in April 1983, titled 48 Newsbreak, in partnership with WBIG-AM; hosted by Lloyd Gordon with 2-minute newsbreak segments, focusing on local and regional news and the weather. In February 1985, the partnership replaced WBIG with WMAG due to Gordon's retirement, with Frank Laseter taking over hosting duties.

Former news logo.

From the fall of 2003 until August 2005, WUPN aired a nightly prime time newscast at 10 p.m., titled UPN 48 News at 10; it was anchored by former WFMY anchor Frank Fraboni. As part of Sinclair's News Central operation, local news segments originated from its studios in Winston-Salem, while national news, sports and weather segments were produced from studios at Sinclair's corporate headquarters on Beaver Dam Road in Hunt Valley, Maryland. News programming expanded to sister station WXLV (whose previous news department had shut down in January 2002), known as ABC 45 News Late Edition, aired weeknights at 11 p.m. from 2004 until 2005 and also featured the News Central format. Both newscasts were canceled in August 2005 due to poor ratings; the News Central format would be phased out entirely in Sinclair's other markets by March 2006.

In lieu of newscasts, WMYV currently airs a rebroadcast of Triad Today, a pre-recorded public affairs program produced for WXLV that is hosted by Jim Longworth, on Sunday nights at 10 p.m.

== Technical information ==
=== Subchannels ===
The station's ATSC 1.0 channels are carried on the multiplexed signals of other Piedmont Triad television stations:

Subchannels provided by WMYV (ATSC 1.0)
Subchannel	Res.	Short name	Programming	ATSC 1.0 host
48.1	720p	WMYV	Main WMYV programming	WXLV-TV
48.2	480i	REWIND	Rewind TV	WGHP
48.3	480i	Comet	Comet	WGHP

WMYV previously carried TheCoolTV until August 31, 2012, when parent company Sinclair dropped the network from 35 of its stations.

=== Analog-to-digital conversion ===
On February 2, 2009, Sinclair told cable and satellite television providers via e-mail that regardless of the exact mandatory switchover date to digital-only broadcasting for full-power stations (which Congress rescheduled for June 12 days later), the station would shut down its analog signal on the original transition date of February 17, making WMYV and WXLV the first stations in the market to convert to digital-only broadcast transmissions. WMYV shut down its analog signal at 11:59 p.m. on that date. The station's digital signal remained on its pre-transition UHF channel 33, using virtual channel 48.

As part of the SAFER Act, WXLV-TV kept its analog signal on the air until March 13 to inform viewers of the digital television transition through a loop of public service announcements from the National Association of Broadcasters.

=== ATSC 3.0 lighthouse ===
Subchannels of WMYV (ATSC 3.0)
Subchannel	Res.	Short name	Programming
8.1	720p	WGHP	Fox (WGHP)
12.1	1080p	WXII	NBC (WXII-TV)
45.1	720p	WXLV	ABC (WXLV-TV)
45.10	1080p	T2	T2
45.11		PBTV	Pickleballtv
48.1	720p	WMYV	MyNetworkTV

Subchannel broadcast with digital rights management
Subchannel streamed via the Internet

== Issue with Time Warner Cable ==
In early 2011, Sinclair Broadcast Group became involved in a retransmission dispute with Time Warner Cable, whose original agreement ended on December 31, 2010. Negotiations between the two parties were extended for another two weeks until January 15, 2011, to allow time for an agreement to be reached. Sinclair and TWC struck a new carriage agreement on February 2, 2011, with no disruption to carriage of WXLV and WMYV; this same deal resulted in the aforementioned news share agreement with News 14 Carolina.

== Out-of-market cable and satellite carriage ==
In recent years, WMYV has been carried on cable in areas outside of the Greensboro television market including cable providers within the Charlotte, Raleigh and Roanoke, Virginia markets. On DirecTV, WMYV has been carried in Grayson County, Virginia, which is part of the Roanoke market.
