= CW 20 =

CW 20 may refer to the following television stations in the U.S. affiliated with The CW:

== Current ==
- WBXX-TV in Crossville–Knoxville, Tennessee
- WCCT-TV in Hartford–New Haven, Connecticut
- WCWG in Greensboro–High Point–Winston-Salem, North Carolina

== Former ==
- WMYD in Detroit, Michigan (2023–2024)
