= Jennie Stencel =

American comedian (born 1976)

Jennie Stencel (born May 19, 1976) is an American journalist, comedian, and television news anchor. She is best known for her time at WXII-TV, an NBC affiliate in Winston-Salem, North Carolina, where she worked from January 2006 to May 2010.

She was formerly the traffic reporter at KENS-TV, a CBS affiliate in San Antonio, Texas, United States. She started on-air at the station in August 2014 and she departed after one year to return to North Carolina. She cited the early mornings as her reason for leaving.

According to WXII-TV's segment which appeared in June 2006, Stencel was hired because of her comedic background and talents to provide the lighter side of the news. She was known for her on-air antics including rapping the traffic report, appearing in her pajamas and reporting as Traffic Girl, the traffic superhero (in costume), "flying" across the triad.

Stencel's traffic rap was used on VH1's WebJunk in June 2006 and ended up as #11 in the year's top forty viral videos on the VH1 countdown. The traffic rap is known to have aired on MSNBC's Countdown with Keith Olbermann, E!'s The Soup, and CNN. The rap, as well as the Traffic Girl segments, can also be found on YouTube.com.

== Background ==
Stencel's earliest known performances were at an improvisational comedy club, ComedySportz in Chapel Hill, North Carolina where she performed from 1995 to 2000.

In 2003, she helped found the Idiot Box, an improvisational comedy club at which she appears weekly, in Greensboro, North Carolina. In addition, she is a regular cast member of the sketch comedy team "There Is No "F" In Sketch".

Stencel was the stand-in for the actress Monica Potter in the film Patch Adams.

Stencel can be seen in Uncle Otto's Truck, a Steven King short story adapted to a short film. She is a regular improv and standup comedian and is the founder of The North Carolina Comedy Festival.
