= WGHP =

Television station in High Point, North Carolina

- High Point–Greensboro–; Winston-Salem, North Carolina; United States
- City: High Point, North Carolina
- Channels: Digital: 31 (UHF); Virtual: 8
- Branding: Fox 8 WGHP

Programming
- Affiliations: 8.1: Fox; for others, see § Subchannels

Ownership
- Owner: Nexstar Media Group; (Tribune Broadcasting Company II, LLC)
- Sister stations: Tegna: WFMY-TV

History
- First air date: October 14, 1963
- Former call signs: WGHP-TV (1963–1998)
- Former channel numbers: Analog: 8 (VHF, 1963–2009); Digital: 8 (VHF, 2009–2010), 35 (UHF, 2000–2009 and 2010–2020)
- Former affiliations: ABC (1963–1995)
- Call sign meaning: Winston-Salem; Greensboro; High Point

Technical information
- Licensing authority: FCC
- Facility ID: 72106
- ERP: 1,000 kW
- HAAT: 397 m (1,302 ft)
- Transmitter coordinates: 35°48′46.5″N 79°50′28.1″W

Links
- Public license information: Public file; LMS
- Website: myfox8.com

WGHP (channel 8) is a television station licensed to High Point, North Carolina, United States, serving the Piedmont Triad region as an affiliate of the Fox network. It is owned by Nexstar Media Group, whose Tegna subsidiary owns CBS affiliate WFMY-TV (channel 2). WGHP's studios on Francis Street just outside downtown High Point, and its transmitter is located in Sophia, North Carolina.

== History ==
=== As an ABC affiliate ===
In 1958, the Federal Communications Commission (FCC) assigned a third VHF channel frequency to the Piedmont Triad area. The channel 8 allocation was freed up by the move of Florence, South Carolina's WBTW to channel 13, and was short-spaced to WCHS-TV in Charleston, West Virginia, and WXEX-TV (now WRIC-TV) in Petersburg, Virginia. Applicants for the High Point channel 8 allocation included Jefferson Standard Broadcasting, owner of WBTV in Charlotte and WBTW. The owner of WTOB-TV (channel 26; whose channel allocation is now occupied by WUNL-TV) in Winston-Salem was also interested.

Southern Broadcast Company—which was 55 percent owned by former WTOB-TV principals, with the remainder owned by former Raleigh UHF station WNAO-TV and residents of High Point—was awarded the license and signed on WGHP on October 14, 1963. It originally operated as an ABC affiliate, taking the affiliation from both WFMY-TV (channel 2) and WSJS-TV (channel 12, now WXII-TV), which previously shared secondary affiliations with the network, taking the Triad region 14 years to gain full-time affiliations for each of the three major networks. WGHP's original studios were located inside the Sheraton Hotel on North Main Street in downtown High Point.

WGHP was subsequently sold to Gulf Broadcasting in 1978. Gulf then sold the station to Taft Broadcasting as part of a group deal in 1984. That same year, the station moved to its current location on Francis Street outside of downtown High Point. On October 12, 1987, Taft was restructured into Great American Broadcasting after a hostile takeover. Former Taft president Dudley Taft formed a new company that took the Taft Broadcasting name and bought WGHP from Great American. The new Taft held onto channel 8 until 1992, when Great American repurchased the station. In December 1993, Great American Broadcasting filed for Chapter 11 bankruptcy and was restructured again to become Citicasters; it then put its entire television division up for sale.

=== As a Fox O&O ===
In the winter of 1993, New World Communications (which acquired stations from SCI in a similar type of business reorganization to the one Citicasters had come out of) agreed to buy WGHP and three other Citicasters-owned stations: WBRC in Birmingham, WDAF-TV in Kansas City and KSAZ-TV in Phoenix. Around the same time, New World had also agreed to buy Argyle Television's four television stations, including WVTM-TV in Birmingham (the transfer applications of the Argyle stations to New World were not submitted to the FCC until after New World closed on the Citicasters purchase). The two purchases combined, along with New World's existing seven stations, left the company with 15 stations—three more than the FCC had permitted a single station owner to operate at the time—and left New World with an ownership conflict in Birmingham.

On May 23, 1994, Fox agreed to affiliate with 12 of New World's stations, with WVTM, NBC affiliate KNSD in San Diego, and independent WSBK-TV in Boston left out of the agreement (the two NBC affiliates were bought by the network and became O&Os while WSBK was sold to the Paramount Stations Group and joined UPN).

New World later determined that due to the ownership conflicts and the fact it would go over the FCC's ownership limit, it would sell WGHP and WBRC to Fox directly. Since Fox was not able to immediately acquire WGHP and WBRC due to questions over the American citizenship of then-parent company News Corporation's Australian-born CEO Rupert Murdoch, New World decided to acquire WGHP but place it in an outside trust on September 9, 1994; WBRC was also put in this trust the following month on October 12. While WDAF switched to Fox and KSAZ became an independent station (a temporary move in preparation for its December switch to Fox) on September 12, three days after New World's purchase of those stations was consummated, ABC still had one year left on its affiliation contract with WGHP (likewise, the network's affiliation contract with WBRC would not run out for two years, which would give ABC time to find a replacement affiliate in Birmingham, which would turn out to be WBMA-LP). These factors also led to New World's decision to sell the two stations to Fox almost immediately.

WGHP logo used through the mid-1980s.

Fox's owned stations division took over the operations of both stations under local marketing agreements in September 1995; WGHP subsequently switched to Fox on September 3. Fox completed its purchases of WGHP and WBRC on January 17, 1996, with WGHP becoming a Fox owned-and-operated station, and the first commercial station in the Piedmont Triad area to be owned by a major network (WBRC had to wait another 7 1/2 months, until September 1996, to switch from ABC to Fox). The move gave WGHP its fifth owner in a little over a decade. The market's original Fox affiliate, WNRW (channel 45), assumed the ABC affiliation and changed its call letters to WXLV-TV.

On September 10, 2007, WGHP debuted a new logo and graphics package as part of a standardized on-air look that was rolled out all of Fox's owned-and-operated stations.

=== Sale to Local TV and then to Tribune ===
On December 22, 2007, Fox sold WGHP and seven other Fox O&O stations to the Oak Hill Capital Partners subsidiary Local TV, which had earlier bought nine stations from The New York Times Company; the sale was finalized on July 14, 2008. On July 1, 2013, the Tribune Company (which formed a management company that operated both Tribune and Local TV's stations in 2008) acquired the Local TV stations for $2.75 billion; the sale was completed on December 27, reuniting WGHP with MyNetworkTV affiliate WPHL-TV in Philadelphia, which Tribune acquired in 1992.

=== Aborted sale to Sinclair; sale to Nexstar ===
Sinclair Broadcast Group—owner of WXLV-TV and WMYV (channel 48)—entered into an agreement to acquire Tribune Media on May 8, 2017, for $3.9 billion, plus the assumption of $2.7 billion in Tribune debt. Sinclair intended to keep WGHP and WMYV, selling WXLV-TV and eight other stations to Standard Media Group. The deal received significant scrutiny over Sinclair's forthrightness in its applications to sell certain conflict properties, prompting the FCC to designate it for hearing and leading Tribune to terminate the deal and sue Sinclair for breach of contract.

Following the Sinclair deal's collapse, Nexstar Media Group of Irving, Texas, announced its purchase of Tribune Media on December 3, 2018, for $6.4 billion in cash and debt. The sale was completed on September 19, 2019.

== Programming ==
As an ABC affiliate, the station occasionally delayed or declined some network programs; for example, it carried the paranormal-themed soap opera Dark Shadows during its network run on ABC, but in the mornings on a day-behind basis, choosing to run classic movies in the afternoons. On the other hand, it did not carry The Edge of Night during its 1975 to 1984 run. In its last years as an ABC affiliate, WGHP aired Nightline on a 30-minute delay in favor of running syndicated programs, most notably M*A*S*H.

When WGHP became a Fox affiliate in 1995, it carried all of the network's programs, including Fox Kids (whose weekday afternoon block ran from 1 to 4 p.m., replacing ABC's soap operas, as well as on Saturday mornings where a local newscast previously ran). WGHP added a few more talk and reality shows, as well as some off-network sitcoms such as I Love Lucy and Seinfeld.

Upon gaining new affiliates through New World, Fox executives at the time decided to change the carriage policies for Fox Kids, to allow a station to choose to keep airing it or be granted the right to pass the block to another station in the market. In February 1996, Pappas Telecasting Companies approached WGHP about acquiring Fox Kids programming for its newly acquired WB affiliate WBFX (channel 20; now CW affiliate WCWG). WGHP accepted the offer, and permitted the Fox Kids block to move to WBFX beginning in March 1996, becoming the first Fox-owned station to no longer run the block, and only one of two (along with WBRC) to do so, before New World merged with Fox in 1997. WGHP added more talk and court shows in the afternoon. WTWB dropped Fox's children's programming in late 2001, when Fox canceled the weekday block nationwide; WGHP chose not to pick up Fox's new Saturday morning cartoon block, Fox Box (later 4Kids TV), which replaced Fox Kids in 2002. As a result, the block did not air at all in the Piedmont Triad. Fox discontinued children's programming on December 28, 2008, replacing it with a two-hour Saturday morning infomercial block called Weekend Marketplace, which WGHP also declined to air; it airs instead on MyNetworkTV affiliate WMYV.

=== News operation ===
WGHP presently broadcasts 55 3/4 hours of locally produced newscasts each week (with 10 1/2 hours on Monday–Thursday, 10 1/4 hours on Fridays and 1 3/4 hours each on Saturdays and Sundays); in regards to the number of hours devoted to news programming, it is the highest local newscast output of any television station in the Piedmont Triad. Now, WGHP also opens a 15-minute sports show following the 10 p.m. newscasts from Friday to Sunday only.

Local news has been a stable product on WGHP since it went on the air in 1963. During the 1960s and 1970s, the station aired newscasts at noon, 6 and 11 p.m., and occasionally at 7 p.m. During the late 1980s and early 1990s, WGHP sporadically maintained a 24-hour broadcast schedule so 11 p.m. newscast rebroadcasts during the early morning hours were only scheduled when ABC network programming was extended long enough to warrant its scheduling; in 1994, the station began broadcasting 24 hours a day.

During the 1980s, channel 8 ran various long-form morning news programs, eventually settling towards five-minute updates during ABC's Good Morning America, along with a noon newscast (that was dropped in the late 1980s). In the early 1990s, the current morning newscast began as an hour-long program at 6 a.m.; it was joined by a half-hour 5 p.m. newscast that expanded to a full hour in 1994. When WGHP affiliated with Fox in 1995, the station began placing more emphasis on its local newscasts: the station's newscasts expanded to just under 40 hours each week. Around this time, WGHP aired three hours of daily newscasts with news on weekday mornings expanding to 2 hours to occupy GMA's former 7–9: a.m. timeslot on the station (the 8 a.m. hour was occupied with syndicated programming), along with the addition of a 5:30 p.m. newscast; the station's late evening newscast was also moved from 11 p.m. to 10 p.m. and was expanded to one hour.

Daily newscasts expanded to 4 1/2 hours—with a half-hour expansion of its morning newscast and the return of a noon newscast—immediately after it became a Fox owned-and-operated station in 1996. The morning newscast would eventually expand over time to five hours by 2011. WGHP is one of only two ex-New World stations that were acquired by Fox and sold by the network in 2008, that did not relaunch a newscast in the traditional late news timeslot—in WGHP's case, 11 p.m. Eastern Time—as Fox did with some of its other O&Os (Cleveland's WJW is the other). On September 13, 2009, WGHP began broadcasting its newscasts in 16:9 widescreen standard definition.

On September 12, 2010, WGHP became the first station in the Piedmont Triad to begin broadcasting its local newscasts in high definition. It remained the only station in the Piedmont Triad with high-definition newscasts until WFMY-TV upgraded its newscasts from widescreen enhanced definition to full high definition on November 13, 2011. However, WGHP remains the only station in the market that broadcasts all of its field video in high definition. On September 12, 2011, WGHP expanded its weekday morning newscast by one hour, adding a fifth hour from 9 to 10 a.m. On January 9, 2012, WGHP's weekday morning newscast expanded a half-hour early to 4:30 a.m. On February 3, 2014, WGHP expanded its noon and 6 p.m. newscasts on weekdays by an additional half-hour (extending both broadcasts to one hour). On April 21, 2014, WGHP debuted an hour-long 4 p.m. newscast on weekday afternoons. On January 3, 2022, WGHP debuted a 7 p.m. newscast.

==== Notable former on-air staff ====
- Dr. Paul Bearer (Dick Bennick) – host of Shock Theatre (1966–1971)
- Rich Brenner – sports anchor (1987–2008)
- Sharon Crews – news and weather anchor (1977–1980)
- Mike Hogewood – sports anchor (1985–1987)

== Technical information ==
=== Subchannels ===
The station's signal is multiplexed:

Subchannels of WGHP
Subchannel	Res.	Short name	Programming
8.1	720p	WGHP	Fox
8.2	480i	TV8.2	Antenna TV
8.3	480i	GRIT	Grit
8.4	480i	DEFY	Defy
48.2	480i	REWIND	Rewind TV (WMYV)
48.3	480i	Comet	Comet (WMYV)

Broadcast on behalf of another station

WGHP broadcasts programming from Antenna TV on digital subchannel 8.2, the subchannel launched on January 1, 2011, as a charter affiliate of the network through an affiliation agreement related to network owner Tribune Broadcasting's management agreement with Local TV. The subchannel uses the on-air branding "TV8.2", a reference to the "TV8" branding used by WGHP from 1977 to 1987. It uses a modified version of the logo that the station used from 1977 to 1982.

=== Analog-to-digital conversion ===
WGHP shut down its analog signal at approximately 11:05 p.m. on June 12, 2009, as part of the FCC-mandated transition to digital television for full-power stations. The station's digital signal relocated from its pre-transition UHF channel 35 to VHF channel 8. The signal had broadcast at full power from an auxiliary tower until the analog transmitter on the main tower was converted two weeks after the transition.

Due to the number of complaints from those unable to pick up the signal on channel 8, WGHP received temporary authorization to broadcast an alternate digital signal on UHF channel 35 on August 19, 2009. While technical issues with the channel 8 signal were being worked out, WGHP transmitted digitally on both 8 and 35 beginning on August 19, 2009. On October 14, WGHP requested that the FCC change its digital signal's physical channel from VHF 8 to UHF 35. After the station lost "a sizeable number" of its viewers, the FCC agreed with WGHP's assessment that it would be "best served" by staying on channel 35. On December 15, 2009, the FCC issued a Report & Order, approving WGHP's move from channel 8 to channel 35. At 11:02 a.m. WGHP terminated operations on channel 8 on March 8, 2010, operating solely on channel 35 on a permanent basis. On April 27, 2020, WGHP transferred to channel 31, as part of the FCC's "repack" initiative.
