= Monica Malpass =

American journalist (born 1961)

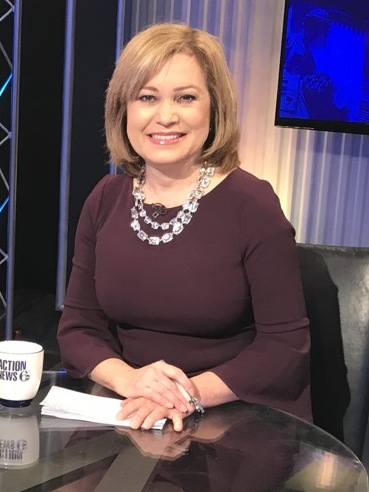
Malpass in 2018

Monica Malpass (born April 28, 1961) is an American journalist and former television anchor for WPVI Action News in Philadelphia, Pennsylvania. She co-anchored the WPVI 5 p.m. weekday newscast and hosted the station's political talk show, Inside Story.

Malpass was born on April 28, 1961 in High Point, North Carolina. She received a bachelor's degree in journalism in 1983 from the University of North Carolina at Chapel Hill. She won a Rotary scholarship to the University of Puerto Rico in 1984.

Malpass began her career as a reporter for the student-run newspaper, The Daily Tar Heel, at the University of North Carolina at Chapel Hill. She then worked as a news anchor and reporter for WCHL-AM in Chapel Hill, North Carolina; a reporter for WFMY-TV, in Greensboro, North Carolina; and a reporter and anchor at WXII-TV in Winston-Salem, North Carolina.

Malpass joined WPVI (Channel 6), the local ABC affiliate in Philadelphia, in January 1988. She initially anchored the morning newscasts.

Malpass obtained a master's degree in political science from Villanova University in 1999. She has also completed the Inside Washington program at the Brookings Institution and was a recipient of an honorary Doctorate of Humane Letters from Neumann College in Pennsylvania.

Malpass announced on the 5 p.m. newscast that she was pregnant with twins on January 11, 2010. She gave birth to twin boys. Malpass has another son with her former husband, David Cutler.

On May 22, 2019, Malpass disclosed that she was leaving WPVI after 31 years. It was not disclosed where she was going.
