= WTOB-TV =

Television station in Winston-Salem, North Carolina (1953–1957)

- Winston-Salem, North Carolina; United States
- Channels: Analog: 26 (UHF)

Programming
- Affiliations: ABC (1953–1957); DuMont (secondary, 1953–1955)

Ownership
- Owner: Winston-Salem Broadcasting Company

History
- First air date: September 26, 1953
- Last air date: May 11, 1957

Technical information
- ERP: 74.1 kW (operated with 13.7 kW)
- HAAT: 174 m (570 ft)
- Transmitter coordinates: 36°05′30″N 80°16′59″W

WTOB-TV (channel 26) was a television station in Winston-Salem, North Carolina, United States, owned by the Winston-Salem Broadcasting Company. The first station on the air in Winston-Salem, it broadcast programming from ABC and operated from September 26, 1953, to May 11, 1957. It was hampered by economic difficulties common to early ultra high frequency (UHF) television stations. After closing, the Winston-Salem Broadcasting Company joined with the Sir Walter Television Company of Raleigh, which owned the similarly shuttered WNAO-TV there, and residents of High Point to win the construction permit for and build WGHP. The transmitting tower used by WTOB-TV in Winston-Salem remained an area landmark for a decade after it shut down.

== Establishment ==
On February 7, 1953, the Winston-Salem Broadcasting Company, which owned Twin City radio station WTOB, obtained a construction permit from the Federal Communications Commission (FCC) to build a station on channel 26 in the new ultra high frequency (UHF) band. The company announced that its new station would be an affiliate of NBC and would open that fall. However, the FCC soon awarded Winston-Salem's VHF channel 12 to radio station WSJS, and its WSJS-TV had secured the NBC affiliation by August, leaving WTOB-TV with ABC. To accommodate television, WTOB radio and the new TV operation moved from the former's existing studios to the Smoke House on Stratford Road, where a 557-foot (170 m) tower, billed as the tallest man-made structure in North Carolina, was erected.

Channel 26 began broadcasting test programs on September 18, 1953, making it the first station to broadcast in Winston-Salem, and programming commenced on September 26 with a sweepstakes and a local talent program. Channel 26 was not alone for long, as WSJS-TV debuted on September 30, in time to carry the first game of the 1953 World Series from NBC. To fill the time between offerings from ABC and the DuMont Television Network, channel 26 produced an array of local programs. WTOB-TV offered its viewers live boxing; Club 26, an all-Black variety show hosted by LaFayette Cooke, the first Black disc jockey on Winston-Salem radio; the children's show Junior Jamboree; filmed high school football; and the country music program Saturday Night Hoedown with Dwight Barker, later seen on WSJS-TV. In 1955, the area around the Smoke House was developed intensively as the Thruway Shopping Center, a local outdoor shopping mall.

The station was hampered in its development by inequities common to UHF stations before the All-Channel Receiver Act took effect in 1964. Most sets had to be converted to tune UHF stations, which hindered the advertising reach of UHF stations; this was the case even though more than 38,000 TV homes in the Piedmont Triad had converted sets to watch channel 26. In 1956, Winston-Salem Broadcasting unsuccessfully asked the FCC to assign channel 8 there; the firm cited its financial losses, which had forced cutbacks in service, and the preference of advertisers to have ABC shows air on a secondary basis on fringe VHF stations instead of a locally based UHF network affiliate.

== Closure; fight for channel 8 ==
The WTOB-TV tower remained standing for another decade and was lit every year at Christmas by the adjacent Thruway Shopping Center.

WTOB-TV suspended operations on May 11, 1957. Company president James W. Coan said that while he believed Winston-Salem could support two TV stations, he wanted the federal government to make up its mind on whether to continue having VHF and UHF stations competing in the same areas. In a later article on the company, in 1964, chairman Gick Johnson attributed the failure of WTOB-TV not to the disadvantages of UHF broadcasting at the time—such as the need to convert sets—but rather to an underdeveloped ABC network. It lost $350,000 in its 3 1/2 years of operation.

Another North Carolina UHF station, Raleigh's WNAO-TV, announced it would cease operations at the end of 1957. That station's owners, the Sir Walter Television Company, then teamed with Winston-Salem Broadcasting on a proposal to assign VHF channel 8 to the Piedmont Triad. The petition supported changing WBTW-TV in Florence, South Carolina, from channel 8 to channel 13 so that channel 8 could be assigned in the Piedmont Triad region; WTOB-TV proposed to move to the channel temporarily, and the two stations founded the Southern Broadcast Company in order to apply for the channel if it were placed there.

Southern formally filed for channel 8 at High Point in November 1958. Its proposal specified that the former WTOB-TV studios would contribute programming to the new High Point station. For the next five years, Southern pursued the High Point channel 8 allotment; an initial decision by a hearing examiner in 1961 favored the owners of WKIX radio in Raleigh, but in 1962, the FCC gave the nod to Southern. As a condition of the award, the WNAO-TV and WTOB-TV construction permits were surrendered for cancellation.

WGHP began broadcasting October 14, 1963; the Winston-Salem studio would originate some of the station's local programming. In 1965, Winston-Salem Broadcasting bought out the other shareholders for $1.2 million.

After WTOB-TV ceased broadcasting, Thruway Shopping Center merchants obtained permission to string the former channel 26 tower with lights and illuminate it at Christmastime. The idea was hatched by Robert Cox, who headed the shopping center's merchants association in 1957, based on the regional draw of the Rockefeller Center Christmas tree. The "Tower of Light" became a local landmark during the holiday season and claimed to be the tallest Christmas tree in the world; several airlines advised passengers to look for it on night flights over North Carolina. While much taller than another contender for "world's tallest tree", the Soldiers and Sailors Monument in Indianapolis, a columnist for The Indianapolis Star derided it as "so slender it looks more like a darning needle than a tree". However, in October 1967, Southern Broadcasting announced it would dismantle the tower because of the hazard posed to shoppers and others from falling ice in the winter as well as the costs of upkeep.
