= WNAO-TV =

Television station in Raleigh, North Carolina (1953–1957)

- Raleigh, North Carolina; United States
- Channels: Analog: 28 (UHF)

Programming
- Affiliations: CBS (1953–1957); NBC (secondary, 1953–1954); DuMont (secondary, 1953–1955); ABC (secondary, 1953–1957)

Ownership
- Owner: Sir Walter Television Company

History
- First air date: July 12, 1953
- Last air date: December 31, 1957

Technical information
- ERP: 182 kW
- HAAT: 140 m (460 ft)
- Transmitter coordinates: 35°47′29″N 78°44′24″W

WNAO-TV (channel 28) was a television station in Raleigh, North Carolina, United States, affiliated with CBS. Owned by the Sir Walter Television Company, it was the first television station in the Raleigh–Durham area and the first ultra high frequency (UHF) television station in North Carolina, broadcasting from July 12, 1953, to December 31, 1957. The station closed because of the establishment of higher-powered, more accessible very high frequency (VHF) television stations in the region.

== History ==
=== Construction and early years ===
On October 16, 1952, the Sir Walter Television and Broadcasting Company was granted a construction permit to build channel 28 in Raleigh. Sir Walter primarily consisted of investors from the Northeastern U.S., some of whom were contesting station assignments in Erie, Pennsylvania, and Baton Rouge, Louisiana; the company had chosen Raleigh over Durham, Winston-Salem, and Roanoke, Virginia, because of the accessibility of talent and the presence of North Carolina State University. The permit originally bore the call letters WETV. However, that December, Sir Walter acquired WNAO (850 AM) and WNAO-FM 96.1 from The News & Observer newspaper in a $250,000 transaction; at the same time, Sir Walter restructured into the Sir Walter Television Company to accommodate a stock purchase by the Jarecki family. The acquisition of the radio stations gave Sir Walter an FM transmission site and was seen by the seller as hastening the arrival of television to Raleigh. The call letters of the television construction permit immediately were changed to WNAO-TV. The station's launch was pushed back from April due to an inability to secure equipment parts on time, particularly the transmitter. WNAO-TV was co-located with the WNAO radio stations at 219 South McDowell Street, near the News & Observer offices.

After airing test patterns since July 8, WNAO-TV began broadcasting at 5:25 p.m. on July 12, 1953, from a transmitter at Asbury (about six miles (9.7 km) west of Raleigh), which also served as the initial studio site until the downtown facility was ready. It was primarily affiliated with CBS, though it aired programming from all four networks, including ABC, NBC, and DuMont. Additional delays meant that all programming had to be aired from films in the early months until the station was interconnected on September 29, in time to air the World Series. Channel 28 boosted its power in 1954, transmitting with 182,000 watts instead of 17,500; plans were also drafted to move all television operations from the Raleigh studio to the Asbury transmitter site. However, many viewers, especially those whose sets could not receive UHF channels, watched their CBS programming on WFMY-TV out of Greensboro, which had the first regularly receivable television signal in Raleigh when it started in 1949.

=== VHF competitors arrive ===
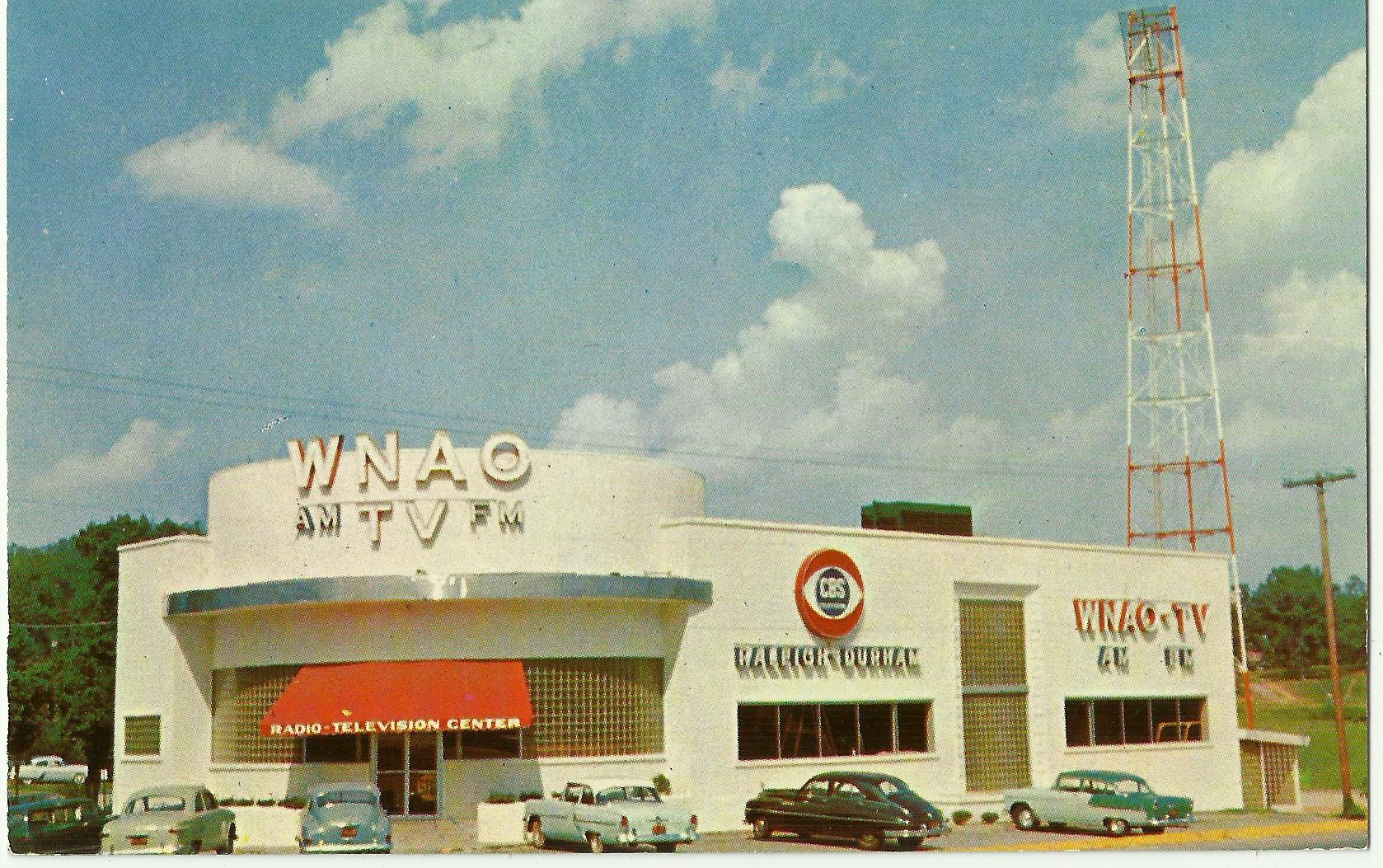
The WNAO radio-TV studio on Western Boulevard in Raleigh, as seen in a 1950s postcard

While WNAO-TV went on air, the two VHF channels for Raleigh and Durham, channels 5 and 11, remained in comparative hearings at the Federal Communications Commission (FCC). The arrival of VHF television in the Triangle, which would begin with the September 2, 1954, launch of WTVD, created increasing concern at Sir Walter as to WNAO-TV's continued viability, given the unequal economic environment faced by UHF stations in the presence of stronger VHF; at the time, not all television sets could tune UHF channels; one local dealer in the Durham area noted the WTVD launch would "make it really tough" on channel 28 to continue operating. In July 1954, Sir Walter petitioned the FCC to change channels 5 and 11 to noncommercial assignments and substitute UHF channels 22 and 40 in their place, which would have deintermixed the region and placed all commercial channels on the UHF band. Radio station WPTF, which was one of two applicants for channel 5 at Raleigh, contested WNAO-TV's proposal. The petition was denied that October.

In 1955, WNAO radio and television moved from 219 South McDowell Street into the former Club Bon Air supper club building on Western Boulevard at Pullen Pike, which had been built in 1946 and had last operated as the Chez Gourmet restaurant. It also became able to begin carrying CBS network color presentations. That year, the company entered into discussions with the University of North Carolina. The year before, UNC had launched educational station WUNC-TV (channel 4), which now found itself in budgetary trouble; while three parties inquired as to potential use of the channel, it was reserved by the FCC as a noncommercial frequency, and the university doubted that it could turn over the facility to commercial interests.

In June 1956, WNAO-TV proposed that channel 5 be moved from Raleigh to Rocky Mount and a UHF allotment be assigned in its stead; the FCC disregarded the proposal and went ahead with awarding the channel to Capitol Broadcasting Company, which built WRAL-TV. Earlier that year, in an appeals court, Sir Walter warned that the award of that channel to Capitol would make it unlikely that WNAO-TV could survive. However, the station declared that, if the FCC were to level the playing field for UHF stations with a plan to require all-channel reception, the station had drafted a proposal to move its transmitter site and broadcast at the maximum of 5 million watts.

In August 1957, Sir Walter sold the radio stations, which had been renamed WKIX-AM-FM, to the Ted Oberfelder Broadcasting Company in order to concentrate on channel 28; the FCC approved the sale in November.

=== Closure and fight for High Point channel 8 ===
In early October 1957, CBS announced that WTVD would assume the network affiliation in the Raleigh-Durham market effective April 1, 1958; the Durham station was an ABC affiliate with a handful of CBS programs, and it was expected that upon the affiliation switch, WNAO-TV would become the new ABC affiliate in the market. A month later, however, WNAO-TV announced that it would suspend operations on December 31 and apply for VHF channel 8 in a joint venture with another silent UHF station, Winston-Salem's WTOB-TV (channel 26). The petition supported changing WBTW-TV in Florence, South Carolina, from channel 8 to channel 13 so that channel 8 could be assigned in the Piedmont Triad region; WTOB-TV proposed to move to the channel temporarily, and the two stations founded the Southern Broadcast Company in order to apply for the channel if it were placed there. Sir Walter reported that it had lost $650,000 since WNAO-TV signed on.

CBS immediately moved ahead its affiliation date with WTVD to January 1 instead of April 1, though it would take months for the entire CBS lineup to move to the new station. WNAO-TV was sued after closure by Ziv Television Programs for more than $8,600 in unpaid program rights fees.

For the next five years, Southern pursued the High Point channel 8 allotment; an initial decision by a hearing examiner in 1961 favored the owners of WKIX radio, but in 1962, the FCC gave the nod to Southern. As a condition of the award, the WNAO-TV and WTOB-TV construction permits were surrendered for cancellation. At the time of the award, Sir Walter principals owned 35 percent of Southern (Winston-Salem principals held 55 percent and five residents of High Point the remainder); in 1965, the Winston-Salem group bought out the other shareholders for $1.2 million.

After the closure of WNAO-TV, the former studios on Western Boulevard housed a furniture store. A fire on the morning of February 23, 1964, gutted the store, causing $175,000 in damage. Channel 28 in the Triangle was reactivated when WRDU-TV, licensed to Durham, began telecasting in November 1968, initially airing programming from CBS and NBC.
