= WCWG =

Television station in Lexington, North Carolina

- Lexington–Winston-Salem–Greensboro–; High Point, North Carolina; United States
- City: Lexington, North Carolina
- Channels: Digital: 16 (UHF), shared with WXII-TV; Virtual: 20
- Branding: Triad CW; WXII 12 News on Triad CW

Programming
- Affiliations: 20.1: The CW; 20.4: Dabl

Ownership
- Owner: Hearst Television; (Hearst Properties Inc.)
- Sister stations: WXII-TV

History
- Founded: May 3, 1983
- First air date: October 30, 1985
- Former call signs: WEJC (1985–1996); WBFX (1996–2000); WTWB-TV (2000–2006)
- Former channel numbers: Analog: 20 (UHF, 1985–2009); Digital: 19 (UHF, 2003–2017), 31 (UHF, 2017–2019)
- Former affiliations: Religious Independent (1985–1990); CTN (1990–1996); The WB (secondary 1995–1996, primary 1996–2006); Fox Kids (secondary, 1996–2001)
- Call sign meaning: "CW Greensboro"

Technical information
- Licensing authority: FCC
- Facility ID: 35385
- ERP: 1,000 kW
- HAAT: 571.9 m (1,876 ft)
- Transmitter coordinates: 36°22′31″N 80°22′25″W

Links
- Public license information: Public file; LMS
- Website: www.wxii12.com/cw

WCWG (channel 20) is a television station licensed to Lexington, North Carolina, United States, serving the Piedmont Triad region as an affiliate of The CW. It is owned by Hearst Television alongside Winston-Salem–licensed NBC affiliate WXII-TV (channel 12). WCWG and WXII-TV share studios on Coliseum Drive in Winston-Salem; through a channel sharing agreement, the stations transmit using WXII-TV's spectrum from an antenna on Sauratown Mountain in Stokes County.

== History ==
The station first signed on the air on October 30, 1985, as WEJC (standing for "We Exalt Jesus Christ"; operating as an independent station, it originally maintained a religious educational format. Initially, the programming was Baptist- and Reformed-based and stayed away from "Signs and Wonders" preaching. The station first operated from studios located off I-85 Business in Lexington. Due to lack of suitable programming as well as the perception of religious programs due to hard times in Christian broadcasting following the Jim Bakker and Jimmy Swaggart scandals starting in 1987, the station was reduced to minimum staffing and operations from the transmitter building near Randleman. It was originally owned by Koinonia Broadcasting. During this time, WEJC's programming was split in approximately half between the Home Shopping Club and religious programming. In 1990, the station moved its operations to a new studio facility located on Guilford College Road in Greensboro, eventually resuming local studio production and eliminated most of the HSN programming. The station was affiliated with the broader-based evangelical Christian Television Network from 1990 until March 1996.

Koinonia sold the station to Pappas Telecasting in 1995. Initially it kept the religious format, but it soon became a WB affiliate, and added that network's programming to its lineup immediately after the sale was finalized. On March 14, 1996, it changed its call letters to WBFX. Religious programming was reduced to mornings from 5 to 7 a.m. and 9 a.m. to noon in the spring of 1996, with the rest of the schedule filled by syndicated cartoons from 7 to 9 a.m., westerns in the early afternoon, cartoons until 5 p.m., additional westerns in the evening, WB programs and older movies in prime time, and drama series and classic movies in the late night hours.

That summer, the station reached an agreement with Fox owned-and-operated WGHP (channel 8) to carry the Fox Kids programming block, which had aired on that station since it switched to Fox in September 1995. Upon gaining new affiliates through its group affiliation deal with New World Communications (which sold WGHP directly to Fox as it placed New World over the 12-station ownership limit at the time), Fox executives had decided to change the carriage policies for Fox Kids, allowing a station to choose to keep airing it or be granted the right to pass the block to another station in the market. More recent off-network sitcoms were added to WBFX's schedule, and more of its religious shows were dropped.

The station's call letters changed to WTWB-TV (for "Triad WB") on August 28, 2000. WTWB dropped Fox's children's programming in March 2001, and WGHP chose not to pick up Fox's new Saturday morning cartoon block, Fox Box (later 4Kids TV), which replaced Fox Kids in 2002. As a result, the block did not air at all in the Piedmont Triad.

On January 24, 2006, the Warner Bros. unit of Time Warner and CBS Corporation announced that the two companies would shut down The WB and UPN and combine the networks' respective programming to create a new "fifth" network called The CW. On March 2, 2006, UPN affiliate WUPN-TV (channel 48, now WMYV) was announced as an affiliate of MyNetworkTV. Two weeks later on March 17, 2006, WTWB was confirmed as the market's CW outlet. On August 10, 2006, the call sign was changed to WCWG (for "CW Greensboro") to reflect the affiliation.

On January 16, 2009, Pappas announced that several of its stations, including WCWG, would be sold to New World TV Group, after the acquisition received United States bankruptcy court approval. At some point, New World TV Group would change its name to Titan Broadcasting. On April 1, 2013, Lockwood Broadcast Group announced it would be acquiring WCWG from Titan Broadcasting; the sale was consummated on September 23.

In the Federal Communications Commission (FCC)'s incentive auction, WCWG sold its spectrum for $105,731,122 and indicated that it would enter into a post-auction channel sharing agreement. WCWG subsequently reached a channel sharing agreement with WXII-TV (channel 12); the station also entered into a separate shared services agreement allowing WXII's owner, Hearst Television, to provide additional services to WCWG. With the spectrum move, WCWG dropped Escape and Laff from their channel lineup on July 31, 2017.

On October 4, 2017, it was announced that Hearst would buy WCWG outright for $3.3 million. The purchase was completed on February 16, 2018.

== News operation ==
As part of the shared services agreement with WXII, the station moved its 10 p.m. newscast from its MeTV subchannel to WCWG beginning July 31, 2017. The newscast was also expanded to a full hour on weeknights while remaining a half-hour on weekends.

On August 28, 2017, WCWG additionally added a two-hour extension of WXII's morning show.

== Technical information ==
=== Subchannels ===
WXII-TV and WCWG transmit using WXII-TV's spectrum from an antenna atop Sauratown Mountain. The stations' signals are multiplexed:

Subchannels of WXII-TV and WCWG
License	Subchannel	Res.	Short name	Programming
WXII-TV	12.1	1080i	WXII-TV	NBC
WXII-TV	12.2	480i	Me-TV	MeTV
WXII-TV	12.3	480i	Story	Story Television
WXII-TV	12.4	480i	QVC2	QVC2
WCWG	20.1	1080i	WCWG CW	The CW
WCWG	20.4	480i	Dabl	Dabl

Subchannel broadcast with MPEG-4 video

Video Mix TV, a localized viewer request music video channel which originated for ten years in the South Florida market, was carried on digital subchannel 20.2 from June 1, 2009, to December 26, 2010. On December 27, 2010, the subchannel affiliated with Black Network Television, an African American-oriented service with emphasis on the local community. BNT's programming was supplemented with syndicated programs, and at launch also included offerings from the AMG TV network. On July 1, 2015, WCWG replaced BNT with the Escape TV channel.

In May 2010, WCWG began carrying Spanish-language network Estrella TV on digital subchannel 20.3. In the summer of 2012, Bounce TV was added to digital channel 20.4. On June 1, 2015, WCWG replaced Estrella TV with the Laff network.

=== Analog-to-digital conversion ===
WCWG shut down its analog signal on June 12, 2009, as part of the FCC-mandated transition to digital television for full-power stations. The station's digital signal remained on its pre-transition UHF channel 19, using virtual channel 20.

== Out-of-market cable and satellite carriage ==
In recent years, WCWG has been carried on cable in Siler City, which is part of the Raleigh television market and in Wytheville, Virginia, which is part of the Roanoke market. On DirecTV, WCWG has been carried in Grayson County, Virginia, which is also part of the Roanoke market.
