= WFMY-TV =

Television station in Greensboro, North Carolina

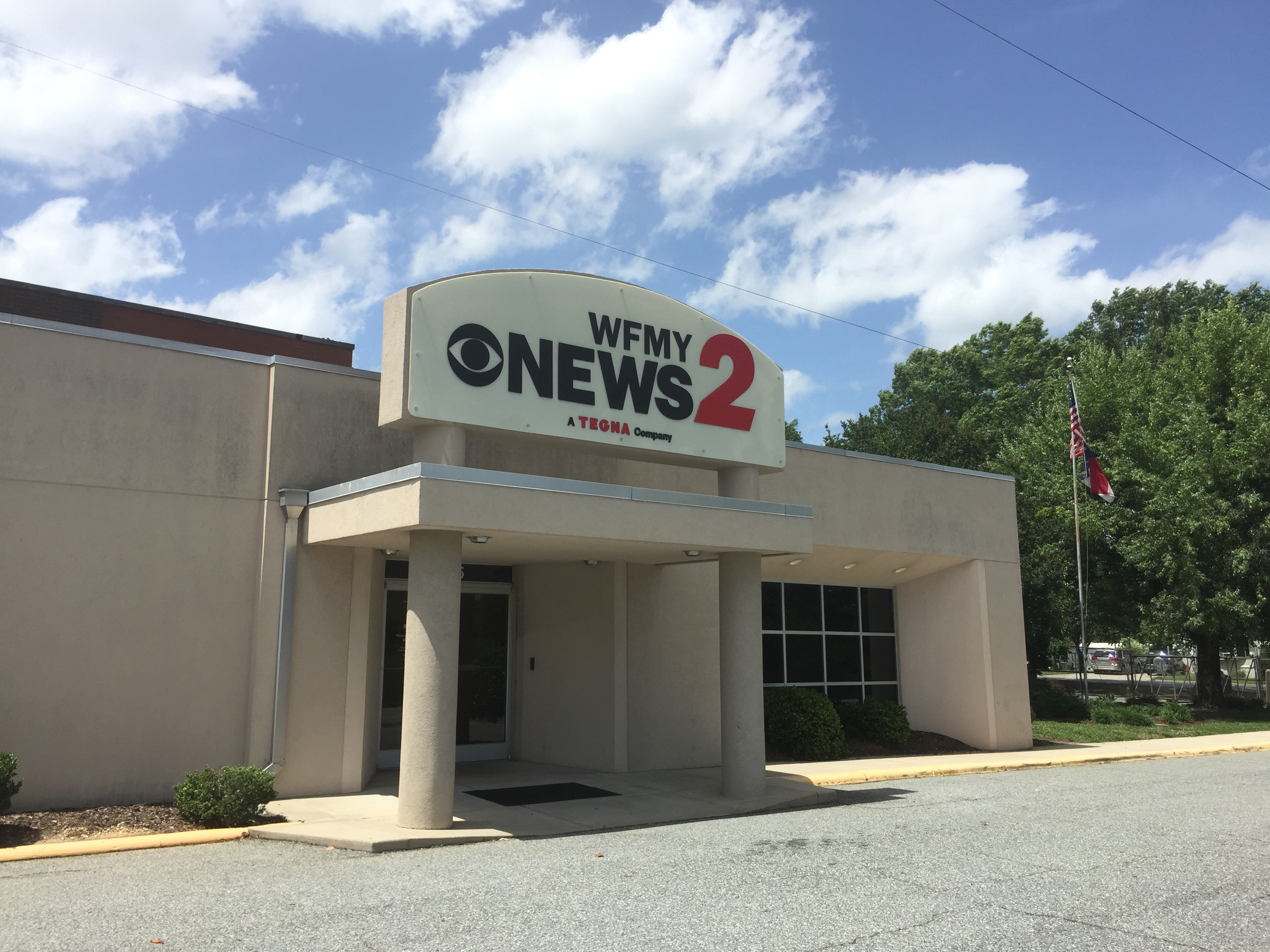
- Greensboro–Winston-Salem–; High Point, North Carolina; United States
- City: Greensboro, North Carolina
- Channels: Digital: 35 (UHF); Virtual: 2
- Branding: WFMY News 2

Programming
- Affiliations: 2.1: CBS; for others, see § Subchannels

Ownership
- Owner: Tegna Inc., a subsidiary of Nexstar Media Group; (WFMY Television, LLC)
- Sister stations: Nexstar: WGHP

History
- First air date: September 22, 1949
- Former channel numbers: Analog: 2 (VHF, 1949–2009); Digital: 51 (UHF, 2002–2020)
- Former affiliations: All secondary: NBC (1949–1953); DuMont (1949–1956); ABC (1949–1963); United (1967)
- Call sign meaning: Began as the television sister of FM station WFMY

Technical information
- Licensing authority: FCC
- Facility ID: 72064
- ERP: 743 kW
- HAAT: 568.8 m (1,866 ft)
- Transmitter coordinates: 35°52′13.3″N 79°50′24.1″W

Links
- Public license information: Public file; LMS
- Website: www.wfmynews2.com

WFMY-TV (channel 2) is a television station licensed to Greensboro, North Carolina, United States, serving as the CBS affiliate for the Piedmont Triad region. It is owned by the Tegna subsidiary of Nexstar Media Group; Nexstar also owns Fox affiliate WGHP (channel 8). WFMY-TV's studios are located on Phillips Avenue in Greensboro, and its transmitter is located in Randleman, North Carolina.

WFMY began broadcasting in 1949; it was the second television station in North Carolina after WBTV in Charlotte and the first to originate a live broadcast. It was owned by the Greensboro News Company, publishers of the Greensboro Daily News and Daily Record. It aired programming from all major networks in its early years, when it was the only station in the Triad, though it was always primarily a CBS affiliate. WFMY became the highest-rated station in the market and the traditional ratings leader, with such regionally popular local shows as The Old Rebel Show and The Good Morning Show. Beginning in the late 1990s, sharper competition from the other major stations in the market has reduced and at times eliminated the lead WFMY-TV once had.

== Early years ==
=== Construction ===
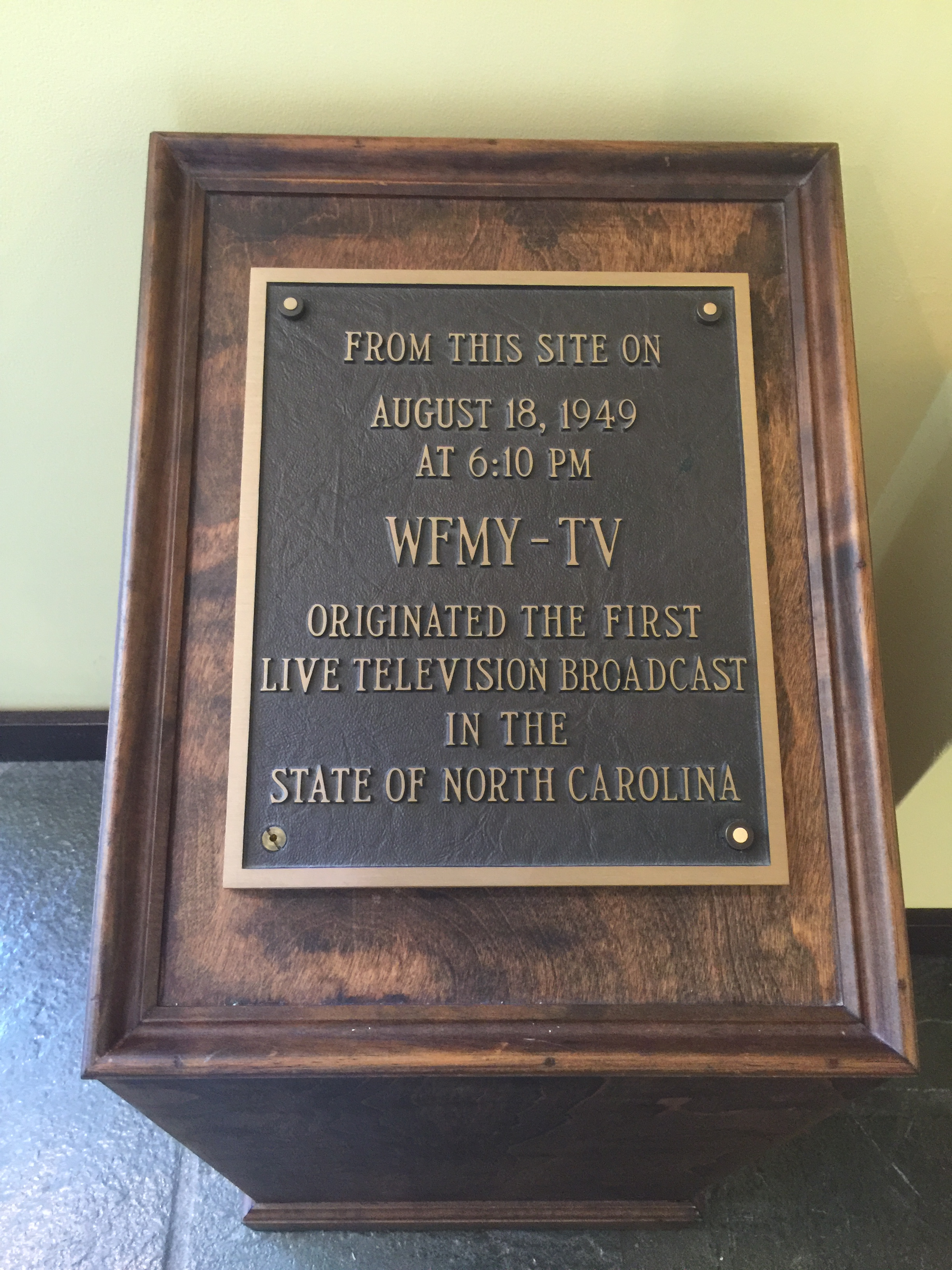
Historical plaque in the lobby of the WFMY-TV studios recognizing the first live television broadcast in North Carolina.

The Greensboro News Company, publisher of the Greensboro Daily News and Daily Record newspapers, began its foray into broadcasting with FM radio. On January 8, 1947, ground was broken on a tower for a new FM radio station, WFMY, near the Daily News building on Davie Street. Construction proceeded slowly; the tower was not completed until December, and WFMY made its first broadcast on March 14, 1948, on 97.3 MHz.

A month before WFMY radio debuted, the Greensboro News Company applied on February 26, 1948, for authority to build a television station. The Federal Communications Commission (FCC) approved the request on June 2, but preparations for the new station began in earnest in April 1949, after final construction approval for changes. Among the last items was a modification to the existing WFMY radio tower, which was set back by the failure of a cable, causing the antenna to drop and be damaged.

WFMY-TV made its first test broadcasts on August 18, 1949. At 6:10 p.m., viewers saw staff announcer Don Hardison; the newscast did not start correctly with sound, and the first words viewers heard Hardison say were "Judas Priest". This was the first live television broadcast in North Carolina; while WBTV in Charlotte was already on the air, it lacked the capability to originate local broadcasts. Full programming began on September 22, 1949, and the station initially aired six days a week, going off the air every Saturday. WFMY-TV was a primary affiliate of CBS, but it had arrangements to use programming from all four networks of the day, including NBC, ABC, and DuMont Television Network. Network programs were presented by kinescopes—filmed recordings of telecasts as seen in New York—until September 1950, when network coaxial cable service reached Greensboro. WFMY radio closed on April 19, 1953, with its studio space and personnel absorbed into the growing television operation.

WFMY and WBTV were the only authorized television stations in North Carolina prior to the FCC's freeze on new television station awards, which lasted from October 1948 to July 1952. As a result, channel 2 was the first television station to provide dependable service not only to the Triad but areas of east-central North Carolina; this included Durham and the state capital, Raleigh, which did not get a local station until July 1953. Even then, WNAO-TV was an ultra high frequency (UHF) station and required a converter to view, so many households in Raleigh continued to mostly watch WFMY until WTVD began in Durham in September 1954. The end of the freeze also brought new stations to the Triad. WFMY-TV became a sole CBS affiliate in September 1953 when two new stations went on the air in Winston-Salem. First on air was WTOB-TV (channel 26), an affiliate of ABC and DuMont, followed by NBC affiliate WSJS-TV (now WXII-TV) on channel 12. WTOB-TV closed in 1957, and channels 2 and 12 split ABC programming until WGHP began on channel 8 in 1963.

=== New studios and new programming ===
Beginning at the end of 1953, WFMY-TV built new facilities and a new tower, 659 feet (201 m) high plus a 101-foot (31 m) antenna, at its present studio site at Phillips and Summit avenues. The new building was six times larger than the 4,500-square-foot (420 m^{2}) facility on Davie Street and boasted two studios, each larger than the original studio of 14 by 26 feet (4.3 by 7.9 m). The station moved to the new studios on January 2, 1955, and simultaneously increased its power to the maximum of 100,000 watts.

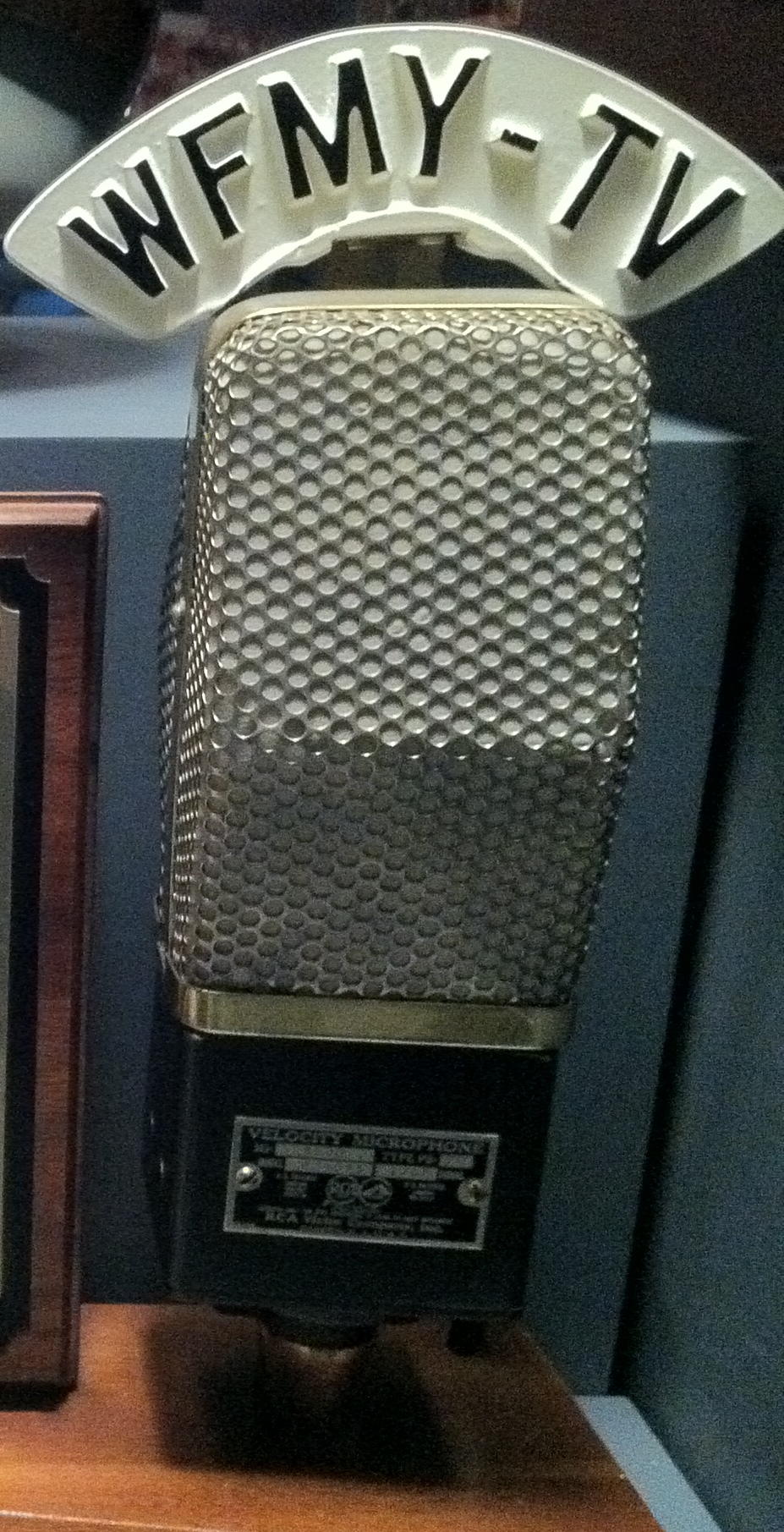
A vintage WFMY-TV microphone

Over the course of the 1950s, WFMY-TV launched three long-running local programs. In 1951, the station debuted the children's show Six-Gun Playhouse. It was hosted by George Perry, who noted a fad of Confederate fashion at the University of North Carolina at Chapel Hill and adopted a "Rebel cap" for his character. The Old Rebel Show—filmed before a live studio audience of dozens of children—remained on the station for 26 years, first in afternoons and then in mornings before becoming a weekly Saturday program in its final year. What's Cooking Today, a cooking series hosted by Cordelia Kelly, ran for 18 years from 1953 to 1971.

The third major program in the 1950s came about as the result of a schedule change by CBS. When the network dropped an early incarnation of The Jimmy Dean Show, program director Gomer Lesch sought to fill the 7:30 a.m. slot it vacated with a local program along the lines of a radio morning show. On December 16, 1957, The Good Morning Show debuted, hosted by WFMY-TV announcer Lee Kinard. Over the years, the program evolved from a half-hour show that played music into a morning show with news, weather, sports, and community features. It expanded first to an hour, then 90 minutes and finally two hours in 1971. Kinard also hosted a variety show in the afternoon, TV Matinee, that lasted until 1965, in addition to presenting the weather on WFMY's early evening newscast.

== Landmark and Harte-Hanks ownership ==
The Greensboro News Company, its newspapers and WFMY-TV included, were acquired by Norfolk–Portsmouth Newspapers Inc. in a $17.1 million transaction in 1964; half the transaction cost was estimated to represent the television station. Despite objections from some FCC commissioners over excessive concentration of media, the deal received approval in December. Norfolk–Portsmouth Newspapers, now with media interests beyond Virginia, renamed itself Landmark Communications in 1967.

The Greensboro sit-ins in 1960 spurred changes in the short- and long-term at WFMY-TV as well as the growth of the news department. These changes became visible in the late 1960s and 1970s as the station hired Black presenters and reporters. Fred Davis, hired in December 1968, was the first Black reporter at the station; his wife received death threats for Fred, threatening a reprise of "what happened to Martin Luther King". Davis left for Michigan, but he recommended television to another graduate of North Carolina A&T State University, Sandra Hughes. Hughes joined in 1972 and two years later was hosting a daily talk show, Sandra & Friends, making her the first African American to host such a program in North Carolina. At times, bomb threats were called into the station; she stayed in the studio as almost everyone else evacuated, keeping the program going.

Harte-Hanks Newspapers acquired WFMY-TV from Landmark in a $19 million deal announced in July 1976 and closed in January 1977. Old Rebel was canceled by the station, having "run its course". Landmark never gave a specific reason for selling WFMY-TV, but newspaper–broadcast cross-ownership limitations were suggested, as was a concurrent project to build a new printing press for the Greensboro newspapers. When Sandra & Friends ended in 1978, Hughes initially moved to hosting the station's version of PM Magazine. By this time, the station had cemented itself as the ratings leader; when one survey in 1978 showed WXII ahead of WFMY-TV at 6 p.m., Jerry Kenion of the Greensboro Daily News called it "the first time in recent memory (and perhaps the first time ever)" that WFMY had been surpassed. That turned out to be a fluke, even by the admission of WXII management. In 1981, the station expanded its evening newscast to an hour, the first in North Carolina outside of Charlotte. In 1982, when CBS expanded its morning offerings, the weekday edition of the network morning show—then titled Morning—was removed from channel 2's schedule to keep the highly popular The Good Morning Show intact, and WFMY also lost Captain Kangaroo due to the scheduling difference.

WFMY-TV built its current tower near Sophia, North Carolina, south of Greensboro, in 1980. The 1,914-foot (583 m) mast cost $3 million to build and was part of a plan to increase the station's coverage area from 11,720 square miles (30,400 km^{2}) to 19,730 square miles (51,100 km^{2}). While it provided at least secondary coverage as far east as Laurinburg, North Carolina, it also impaired reception for residents in its shadow.

On the evening of September 25, 1984, the station's leased Bell JetRanger news helicopter, "Sky 2", crashed while attempting to assist in the rescue of a construction worker trapped atop a water tower in Kernersville (near Winston-Salem). The tower was being dismantled when a piece of steel snapped and trapped the worker for hours, causing him to bleed profusely; "Sky 2" was called in to assist in the rescue. Pilot Tom Haroski began lowering the chopper above the tower, as an EMS worker on board was preparing to rescue the man. The chopper's tail rotor hit one of the steel beams as it hovered over the tower, sending it spiraling nose-first into the ground, killing Haroski and the rescue worker instantly.

== Gannett/Tegna ownership ==
In 1984, Harte-Hanks underwent a leveraged buyout that saddled it with $700 million in debt. To reduce this load, Harte-Hanks put a number of its divisions up for sale in October 1987, including three newspapers, seven cable systems, and WFMY-TV and WTLV in Jacksonville, Florida. That December, Gannett agreed to buy WFMY-TV and WTLV for $155 million. The transaction was completed in February 1988. WFMY's first general manager under Gannett, Hank Price, found the station in good condition and not needing any major changes. CBS This Morning began airing on tape delay in 1988, running after The Good Morning Show.

As late as 1995, WFMY held leads in all time periods where it had newscasts. However, its ratings soon came under pressure. Kinard left The Good Morning Show in November 1997 after just under 40 years, and the station was experiencing increased competition from WGHP and WXII, to which it responded by updating the look and feel of its newscasts and the format of Good Morning—now airing for three hours—to appeal to younger viewers. The 1998 local introduction of people meters for ratings purposes also hurt WFMY by increasing the representation of younger viewers, who were less likely to be loyal to the station.

Kinard retired from the 6 p.m. newscast in December 1999. By then, WXII had come to surpass WFMY at 11 p.m., and WGHP was more competitive in the morning. For WXII, this was the result of a strategy over the course of the 1990s to increase its coverage of news events beyond the western Piedmont and into Greensboro, the market's largest city; WGHP, which had made a similar decision, benefited from its 1995 affiliation switch from ABC to Fox. WFMY, with a news viewership described in 2000 as "older and more ethnic", now found itself in a regularly close ratings race. Hughes retired in 2010, capping a 20-year run as evening anchor at the station, which named its newsroom for her.

In 2011, under general manager Larry Audas, WFMY revamped its news format, dubbed "News 2.0". Shortly after, the station launched an expansion of The Good Morning Show to 4:30 a.m. A new newscast displaced a fixture on channel 2's schedule: the 5:30 p.m. airing of The Andy Griffith Show, which WFMY-TV had aired in that time period for decades.

On June 29, 2015, the Gannett Company split in two, with one side specializing in print media and the other side specializing in broadcast and digital media. WFMY was retained by the latter company, named Tegna.

In December 2019, The Good Morning Show was changed to end at 7 a.m., allowing CBS This Morning to air live for the first time on WFMY; this was part of a larger schedule overhaul that included a 4 p.m. newscast.

Nexstar Media Group, owner of WGHP in the Piedmont Triad market, acquired Tegna in a deal announced in August 2025 and completed in March 2026. A temporary restraining order issued one week later by the U.S. District Court for the Eastern District of California, later escalated to a preliminary injunction, has prevented Nexstar from integrating the two stations.

== Notable former on-air staff ==
- Chip Caray – weekend sports anchor, 1988–1989
- Woody Durham – sports director, 1963–1977
- Mike Hogewood – sports director, 1987–2001
- Monica Malpass – news researcher, early 1980s
- Topper Shutt – weekend meteorologist, 1987–1988
- Rolonda Watts – reporter, early 1980s

== Technical information ==
=== Subchannels ===
WFMY-TV's transmitter is located in Randleman, North Carolina. The station's signal is multiplexed:

Subchannels of WFMY-TV
Subchannel	Res.	Short name	Programming
2.1	1080i	WFMY HD	CBS
2.2	480i	Crime	True Crime Network
2.3	480i	Mystery	Ion Mystery
2.4	480i	Quest	Quest
2.5	480i	365 NET	365BLK
2.6	480i	Crimes	Outlaw
2.7	480i	QVC	QVC Over the Air
2.8	480i	HSN	HSN

=== Analog-to-digital conversion ===
WFMY-TV began digital broadcasting on April 18, 2002, as the second local station to do so. It ended regular programming on its analog signal on June 12, 2009, as part of the FCC-mandated transition to digital television for full-power stations. The station's digital signal remained on its pre-transition UHF channel 51, using virtual channel 2. As part of the SAFER Act, WFMY-TV kept its analog signal on the air until July 12 to inform viewers of the digital television transition through a loop of public service announcements from the National Association of Broadcasters.

On May 15, 2020, under the provisions of the FCC's spectrum reallocation program, WFMY's transmissions moved to channel 35.
