= WXII-TV =

Television station in Winston-Salem, North Carolina

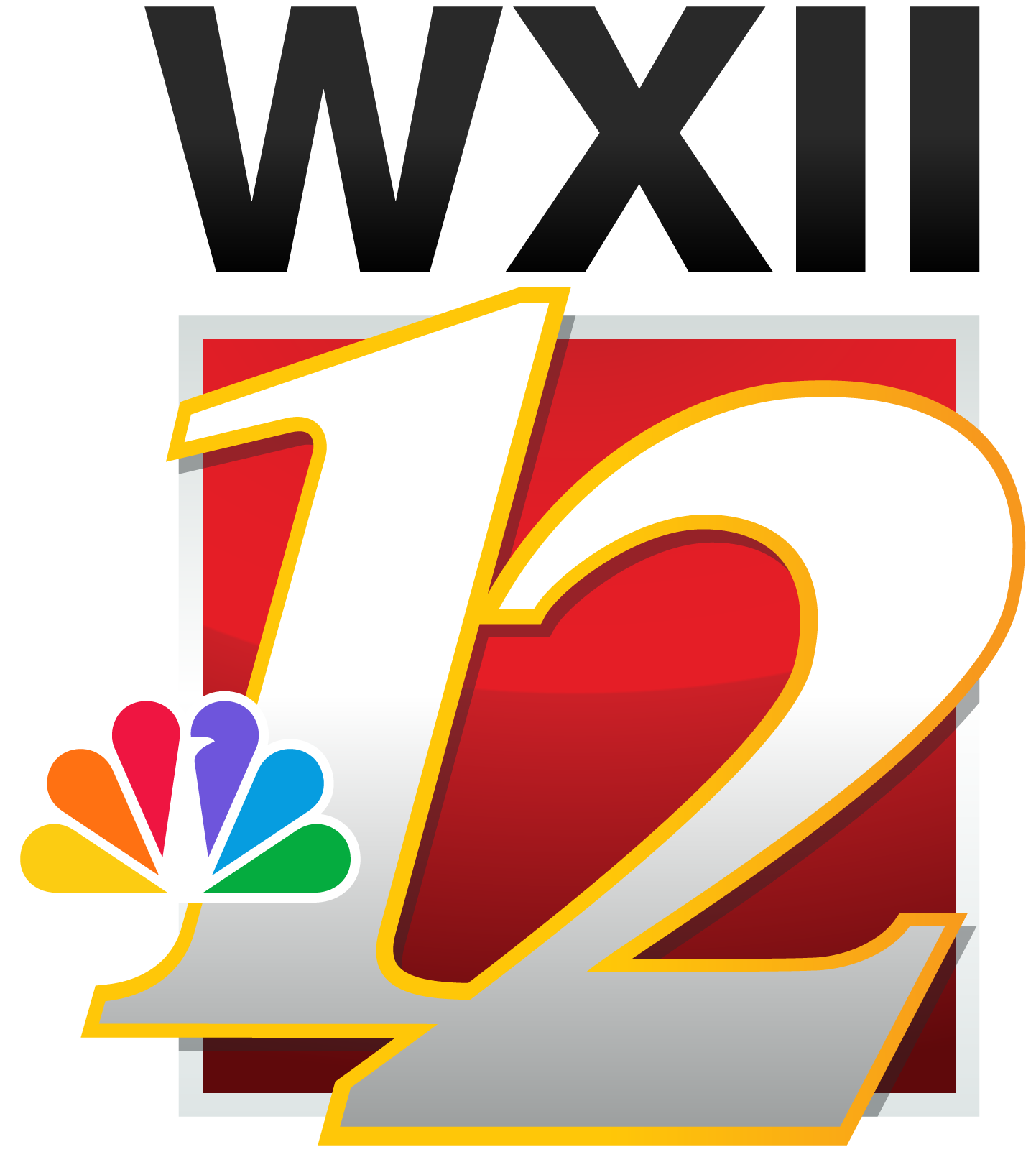
- Winston-Salem–Greensboro–; High Point, North Carolina; United States
- City: Winston-Salem, North Carolina
- Channels: Digital: 16 (UHF), shared with WCWG; Virtual: 12
- Branding: WXII 12

Programming
- Affiliations: 12.1: NBC; for others, see § Subchannels

Ownership
- Owner: Hearst Television; (Hearst Properties Inc.)
- Sister stations: WCWG

History
- First air date: September 30, 1953
- Former call signs: WSJS-TV (1953–1972); WXII (1972–1982)
- Former channel numbers: Analog: 12 (VHF, 1953–2009); Digital: 31 (UHF, 1999–2019)
- Former affiliations: ABC (secondary, 1953–1963)
- Call sign meaning: "XII" is the Roman numeral for 12

Technical information
- Licensing authority: FCC
- Facility ID: 53921
- ERP: 1,000 kW
- HAAT: 571.9 m (1,876 ft)
- Transmitter coordinates: 36°22′31″N 80°22′25″W

Links
- Public license information: Public file; LMS
- Website: www.wxii12.com

WXII-TV (channel 12) is a television station licensed to Winston-Salem, North Carolina, United States, serving the Piedmont Triad region as an affiliate of NBC. It is owned by Hearst Television alongside Lexington-licensed CW affiliate WCWG (channel 20). WXII-TV and WCWG share studios on Coliseum Drive in Winston-Salem and broadcast from the same transmitter on Sauratown Mountain in Stokes County.

The station began broadcasting as WSJS-TV on September 30, 1953, and has been an NBC affiliate since its first day on air. It was the second television station to start in Winston-Salem, days after WTOB-TV (channel 26), which lasted four years, and was owned by Triangle Broadcasting, a consortium of the Piedmont Publishing Company—publisher of the Winston-Salem Journal and Twin City Sentinel newspapers and owner of radio station WSJS—and actress Mary Pickford, who sold her shares in 1966. Originally housed in cramped quarters at the WSJS radio studios, in 1966 it moved to its present facility, the purpose-built Broadcast House.

After divesting the newspapers and starting a cable television system, Triangle Broadcasting sold the station to Multimedia, Inc. in 1972; in being separated from WSJS radio, the station became WXII. It struggled in the late 1970s and early 1980s due to poor news ratings, which were strong in Forsyth County but weak elsewhere, and the underperformance of the NBC network. After being part of a trade to Pulitzer Publishing in 1983, WXII slowly improved its standing in the market and its news ratings. In the late 1990s, it owned and operated WXII (830 AM), an all-news radio station. By the time Pulitzer exited broadcasting in 1998, WXII—which still emphasized "Western Piedmont"–area news from Winston-Salem and counties to the west—was competitive in the Triad, a market once dominated by WFMY-TV.

Pulitzer sold its broadcasting division to Hearst in 1998. Seeking to follow population growth, in 2000 WXII added Guilford County—containing Greensboro and High Point—to its news coverage area. It emerged as the news leader in total households. WCWG was acquired in 2017 and broadcasts additional WXII-TV newscasts.

== WSJS-TV: Early years ==
The Piedmont Publishing Company, publisher of the Winston-Salem Journal and Twin City Sentinel newspapers and owner of radio station WSJS, filed in May 1949 for channel 6, then assigned to Winston-Salem. The other application for channel 6 came from the actress Mary Pickford, who filed concurrently for stations at Winston-Salem and Durham. These applications were left to wait for the Federal Communications Commission (FCC) to end its then-prevailing freeze on new television station grants. When the FCC changed its allocations ahead of lifting the freeze in April 1952, it instead gave Winston-Salem channel 12. Piedmont Publishing petitioned the FCC to restore channel 6, to no avail. The end of the freeze brought a third applicant into the channel 12 fight: Winston-Salem radio station WTOB, which filed in June but had been planning a television station since 1947. WTOB opted at the start of 1953 to switch its application from channel 12 to UHF channel 26.

On May 26, 1953, Piedmont Publishing and Pickford agreed to combine their applications, with Pickford receiving a one-third stake in the Triangle Broadcasting Corporation, the proposed licensee of channel 12. The move appeared to speed up the arrival of channel 12 until the owner of WAAA, Community Broadcasting, tendered its own application days later. Recognizing that this application would stall the availability of television in Winston-Salem, Community president F. Roger Page Jr. withdrew his company's application, and the FCC awarded a permit for WSJS-TV on July 9, 1953. The new station was announced to broadcast from the WSJS-FM site east of Winston-Salem. WSJS-TV began broadcasting on September 30, 1953, airing the 1953 World Series and NBC network programming. It was the second TV station to go on the air in Winston-Salem in four days, with WTOB-TV starting service on September 26 and airing ABC and DuMont programs. In 1955, the station relocated its transmitter facility to Sauratown Mountain in Stokes County and increased its effective radiated power to the maximum 316,000 watts. The WSJS television operation, which had been accommodated in the radio station's existing offices on Spruce Street, expanded into a basement previously used to store newsprint. WTOB-TV ceased broadcasting in 1957, and ABC programs were split between WSJS-TV and WFMY-TV (channel 2) in Greensboro until a third VHF station, WGHP (channel 8) in High Point, began in 1963.

The station went through many staff in its early days as television was a new industry in itself. Local programs such as The Johnny Comas Show and the news attracted audiences; staff moved back and forth between radio and television. The cramped quarters prompted the lobby to become storage for appliances shown in commercials, and the air conditioning system could not compensate for the hot studio lights. Johnny Beckman, who later was a meteorologist for several stations in Atlanta, joined the WSJS-TV staff in 1954 and recalled working in its early years:

There were three of us, and we all did multiple jobs—the weather, commercials, a teenage dance party. We were all scrambling around trying to make a living. Broadcasting was not high-paying then. The pay has certainly improved, but it was a more enjoyable career than it has become now.

Piedmont Publishing held an option to buy out Pickford's stake in WSJS-TV and exercised it in 1956. However, in April 1958, Piedmont Publishing sued Pickford in Los Angeles County Superior Court in California, alleging that Pickford and her husband Charles "Buddy" Rogers had turned down the $126,812 in checks sent to them—on an initial investment of $50,000—as not enough money. The case went to trial in March 1959; lawyers for Pickford and Rogers stated that their clients valued their stake in the station at $1 million. Pickford claimed that she was made to believe that Piedmont would never exercise the option. After 11 weeks, the judge ordered Pickford and Rogers to sell their stock for $133,243, a price just above what Piedmont had paid for it. Pickford petitioned for this amount to be increased but lost. The matter was settled in 1966, when Pickford and Rogers sold their stake back to Piedmont Publishing for an undisclosed price.

In January 1963, Piedmont Publishing purchased a parcel of land on Coliseum Drive for future expansion use by the WSJS stations. Construction began on a 33,408-square-foot (3,103.7 m^{2}) studio facility in May 1965. The new building offered two television studios, up from one, as well as an internal courtyard capable of being used as a studio. WSJS-TV began operating from the new building, known as Broadcast House, in November 1966. Though WSJS-TV had broadcast network color programs since 1954, the new equipment at Broadcast House included color studio cameras, allowing local news and other programs to be presented in color. The newspapers were spun off to separate ownership in 1969 when they merged with Richmond Newspapers Inc. to form Media General.

== WXII-TV: The Multimedia era ==
In 1971, the FCC adopted a rule barring cross-ownership of a television station and a cable system in the same area. Triangle Broadcasting, which had expanded into the latter field by operating Winston-Salem's Tele-Cable system, opted to keep that business and divest WSJS-TV. In October 1971, it agreed to sell the television station to Multimedia, Inc., which had media interests in the Carolinas, Georgia, and Tennessee. Gordon Gray, whose family owned Triangle, announced his intention to use proceeds from the sale to acquire the Graylyn estate—built by his father, Bowman Gray Sr., from Wake Forest University. On a 5–0 vote, the FCC approved the $7.3 million transaction in September 1972. The transaction led to the untangling of channel 12 from the WSJS radio stations. The TV station changed its call sign to WXII—containing the Roman numeral for 12—on October 3 and retained 77 employees, with the formerly combined news department being split and WSJS radio remaining in Broadcast House for the short term.

In 1978, Reynard Corley was hired by Multimedia to revamp WXII and improve its ratings beyond Forsyth County, home to Winston-Salem, where it had been strongest. Though one ratings survey—apparently an outlier—showed WXII beating WFMY in the news ratings in 1978, WXII generally rated in second or third behind WGHP and the traditional news ratings leader, WFMY. The station struggled due to poor news ratings, exacerbated by the changes made by Corley at the start, as well as the poor national ratings of its network, NBC. In 1980, it dismissed three employees whose on-air tenures with the station exceeded 20 years, closed a recently opened bureau in Raleigh, and reassigned several other employees.

== Pulitzer ownership ==
In 1981, Multimedia announced it would trade WXII and WFBC-TV (now WYFF) in Greenville, South Carolina, to Pulitzer Publishing Company in exchange for KSDK in St. Louis. WXII was included to equalize the trade of the other two stations, which were both cross-owned with newspapers in their respective communities at a time when pressure was increasing to end such ownership. The transaction required Pulitzer to divest one of the VHF TV stations it owned elsewhere, which materialized in a sale of WLNE-TV in New Bedford, Massachusetts. The trade—which had received petitions to deny from Black media groups in St. Louis and Greenville—received FCC approval in February 1983 and closed later that month.

Pulitzer stepped into a situation that had been stifled by the transaction. A news director who had been hired by Multimedia three days before the trade was announced left and went to work for WFMY-TV instead; while the trade was pending, the station froze purchases of syndicated programming. Pulitzer invested in equipment and new full-time news positions for the station to try and improve its longtime third-place ratings position. Though WXII slightly increased its late news ratings, it still found itself well behind WFMY by 1988. By the end of the decade, it was narrowly ahead of WGHP at 11 p.m. but still six percentage points behind WGHP at 6 p.m., at a time when WGHP was making small ratings gains. A morning newscast debuted in 1990; WXII had previously had various local morning programs, none of them successful in the long term in a time period dominated by WFMY's The Good Morning Show.

WXII's news history began to turn with the 1996 Summer Olympics, which NBC aired. Ahead of the Olympics, the station relaunched its news product as NewsChannel 12 and began focusing its news coverage on Winston-Salem and areas to the west—a concept promoted by the station as the "Western Piedmont". The Olympics temporarily boosted the station's ratings across the day. Though WFMY regained its ratings strength in the next survey, pushing WXII back to a firm second place, it was the first time WFMY had not been in first place in local news in some time. WXII edged past WFMY again at 11 p.m., this time without the aid of the Olympics, in the November 1997 ratings. Though WXII had the number-one 11 p.m. newscast by 1998, it had fewer viewers than the 10 p.m. newscast from WGHP, by now a Fox affiliate. The "Western Piedmont" format built a strong regional news specialty for WXII, with audience shares surpassing 50 percent in the area even if it did not cover Guilford County, home to Greensboro and High Point.

In 1997, Pulitzer agreed to acquire WETR (830 AM), a radio station licensed to Eden with a 50,000-watt signal. The deal received FCC approval in September 1997, after which the station was moved to a new five-tower array north of Winston-Salem and returned to the air as WXII AM in March 1998. It offered simulcasts of local and NBC newscasts, an all-news radio service from the Associated Press, and coverage of Wake Forest Demon Deacons athletics while also serving as a promotional tool for the TV station.

== Hearst ownership ==
Pulitzer agreed to sell its entire broadcasting division, including WXII, to Hearst-Argyle Television (Note: In 2009, the Hearst Corporation acquired Argyle's stake in the venture, took it private, and renamed it Hearst Television.) in 1998.

When I flew over Greensboro, I saw all those new housing developments on every other block. So I think we have to pay attention to demographics and economic trends to be a better business. This is a very diversified region; we have to diversify our coverage.

— Michelle Butt, news director, WXII-TV, on adding Greensboro to the station's news coverage area

In 2000, Hearst made two major changes to the operation. Citing increasing growth in Guilford County, home to Greensboro and High Point, Hearst ended the "Western Piedmont" orientation and began covering Guilford County news. It was the first time the station had a presence in Greensboro since 1990, when it closed its most recent news bureau. Hearst sold WXII radio to the Truth Broadcasting Company, owned by Stuart Epperson, which flipped it to a Christian talk and teaching format as WTRU.

WXII continued to improve its market standing after the change. By 2003, it was in a close second place behind WGHP in all evening news time slots among adults 25–54, with the 2002 acquisition of The Oprah Winfrey Show helping increase early evening ratings. One laggard was the morning newscast, which still rated third; general manager Hank Price admitted that it was "the one place we have not made the progress we would have liked". Under Price, who had previously held the same position at WFMY, several former personalities of that station made appearances on WXII as part-time reporters or in unpaid capacities, including Lee Kinard, who spent 43 years at WFMY, and Randy Jackson, who spent 21. In 2005, WXII was the fourth NBC affiliate to debut an NBC Weather Plus subchannel; Price had been part of the product development team for the venture. By 2011, the station led in total households in almost all news time slots, except noon (second to WFMY) and late (a close second to WGHP's 10 p.m. news).

The second subchannel changed from weather to This TV in 2009 and to MeTV in 2012. Alongside the switch to MeTV, WXII began airing a 10 p.m. newscast, which was conceived by Price to complement the diginet's popularity and reach an audience unserved by WGHP's newscast in that time slot.

In 2017, Hearst entered into channel sharing and shared services agreements with WCWG (channel 20), the Triad's affiliate of The CW, which sold its spectrum in the incentive auction. As part of the agreement, the WXII-TV news department expanded to WCWG; the 10 p.m. news moved there in July and became a full hour on weeknights, while a morning news extension from 7 to 9 a.m. debuted on August 28. Hearst acquired the WCWG license outright from Lockwood Broadcasting in a deal announced in October 2017 and completed in February 2018.

== Notable former on-air staff ==
- Ken Ackerman – sportscaster
- John Beard – 11 p.m. anchor, –1977
- Paul Dellegatto – chief meteorologist, 1986–1989
- Monica Malpass – weekend anchor and reporter, 1985–1988
- Bonnie Schneider – meteorologist, 1994–1997
- Jennie Stencel – traffic reporter, 2006–2010

== Technical information ==
=== Subchannels ===
WXII-TV and WCWG transmit using WXII-TV's spectrum from an antenna atop Sauratown Mountain. The stations' signals are multiplexed:

Subchannels of WXII-TV and WCWG
License	Subchannel	Res.	Short name	Programming
WXII-TV	12.1	1080i	WXII-TV	NBC
WXII-TV	12.2	480i	Me-TV	MeTV
WXII-TV	12.3	480i	Story	Story Television
WXII-TV	12.4	480i	QVC2	QVC2
WCWG	20.1	1080i	WCWG CW	The CW
WCWG	20.4	480i	Dabl	Dabl

Subchannel broadcast with MPEG-4 video

=== Analog-to-digital conversion ===
WXII-TV was the first station in the Piedmont Triad market to broadcast in digital, beginning digital broadcasts either in September 2001 or on March 19, 2002. WXII-TV ended regular programming on its analog signal, over VHF channel 12, on June 12, 2009, as part of the digital television transition. The station's digital signal remained on its pre-transition UHF channel 31 until being repacked to channel 16 on September 6, 2019, as a result of the 2016 United States wireless spectrum auction.
