= WECT =

Television station in Wilmington, North Carolina

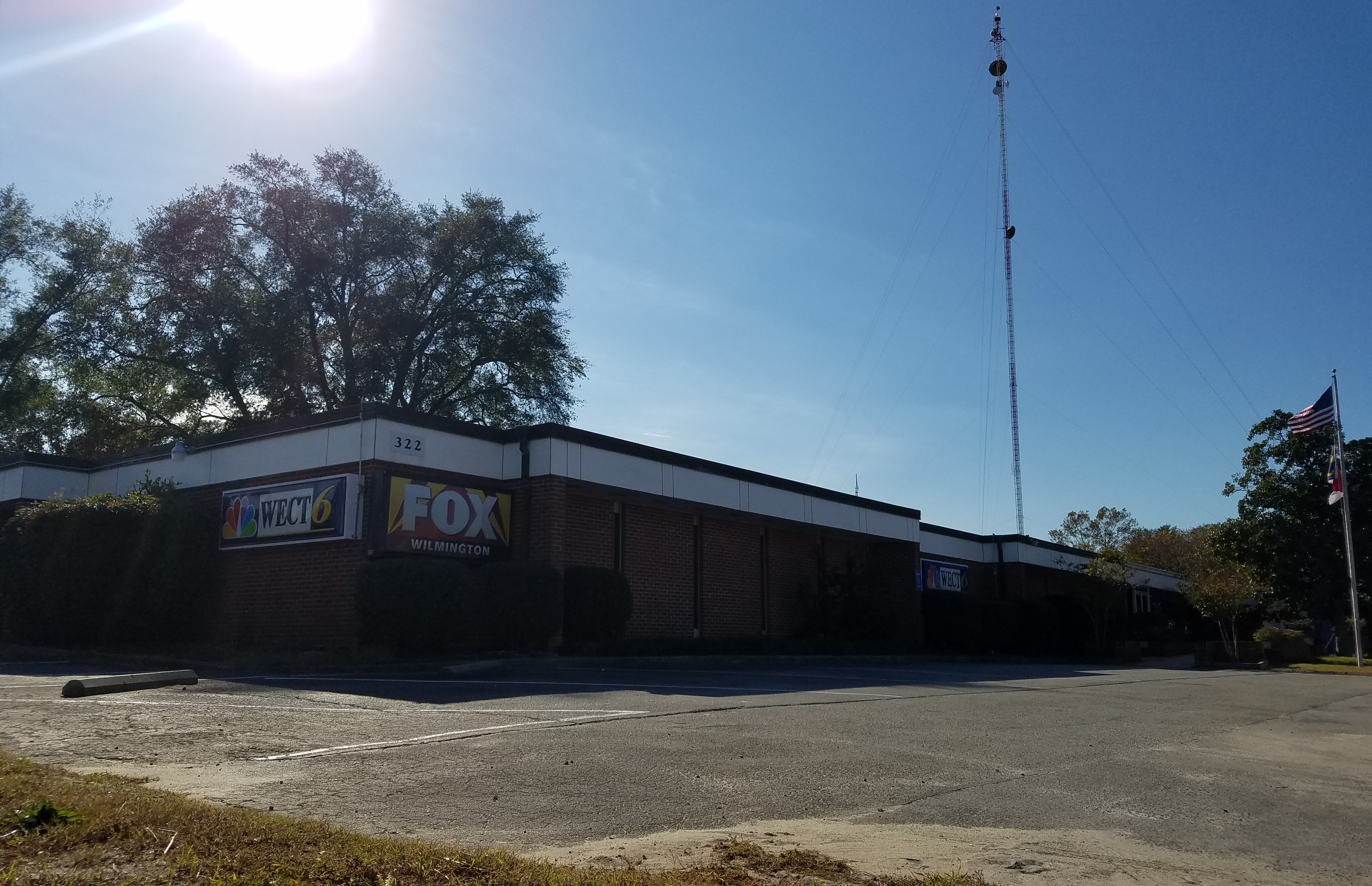
- WECT and WSFX headquarters in Wilmington, North Carolina
- Wilmington, North Carolina; United States
- Channels: Digital: 23 (UHF); Virtual: 6
- Branding: WECT; WECT News

Programming
- Affiliations: 6.1: NBC; for others, see § Subchannels

Ownership
- Owner: Gray Media; (Gray Television Licensee, LLC)
- Sister stations: WSFX-TV, WTWL-LD

History
- First air date: April 9, 1954
- Former call signs: WMFD-TV (1954–1958)
- Former channel numbers: Analog: 6 (VHF, 1954–2008); Digital: 44 (UHF, until 2020)
- Former affiliations: All secondary: DuMont (1954–1956); ABC (1954–1964); CBS (1954–1975)
- Call sign meaning: We're Eastern Carolina Television

Technical information
- Licensing authority: FCC
- Facility ID: 48666
- ERP: 550 kW
- HAAT: 592.2 m (1,943 ft)
- Transmitter coordinates: 34°7′54″N 78°11′16″W

Links
- Public license information: Public file; LMS
- Website: www.wect.com

WECT (channel 6) is a television station in Wilmington, North Carolina, United States, affiliated with NBC. It is owned by Gray Media alongside Telemundo affiliate WTWL-LD (channel 31) and Fox affiliate WSFX-TV (channel 26). The three stations share studios on Shipyard Boulevard in Wilmington; WECT's transmitter is located near Winnabow, North Carolina.

== History ==
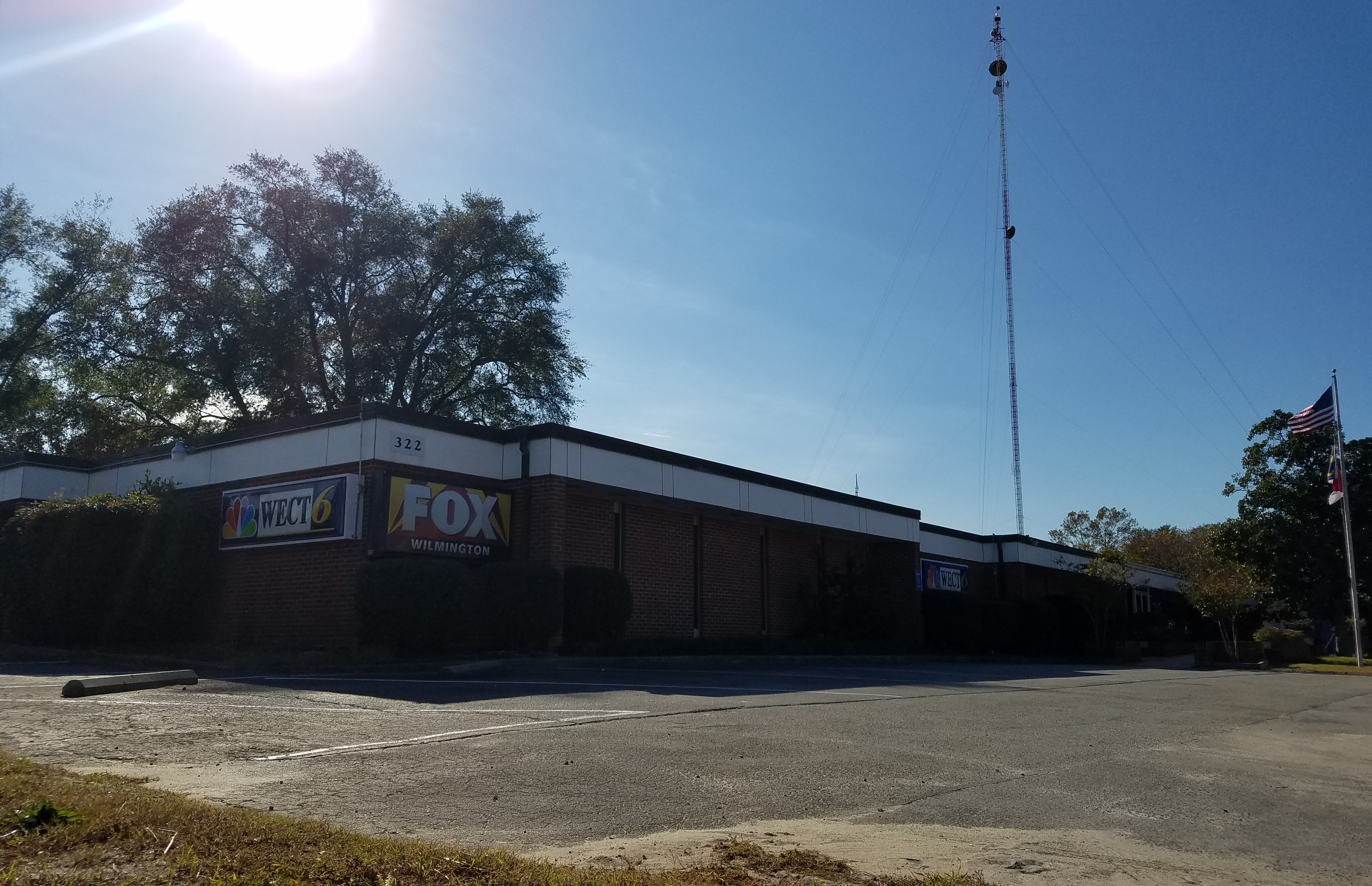
WECT and WSFX headquarters in Wilmington, North Carolina

Channel 6 began broadcasting on April 9, 1954, with the call sign WMFD-TV. It aired an analog signal on VHF channel 6 from a 941-foot (287 m) transmitter near Delco. The station was owned by Atlantic Telecasting Corporation alongside Wilmington's oldest radio station, WMFD. Atlantic Telecasting sold off the radio station in 1958 and changed the television station's calls changed to the current WECT. The callsign WMFD-TV is now used by an independent television station in Mansfield, Ohio.

At its launch, channel 6 was affiliated with all four networks of the day—NBC, CBS, DuMont and ABC. However, it has always been a primary NBC affiliate. It lost DuMont when that network went silent in 1956. The station finally got local competition in 1964 when WWAY signed on. However, WWAY opted to affiliate with the much weaker ABC, forcing WECT to shoehorn NBC and CBS onto its schedule until the 1970s, when cable arrived in the Wilmington market. It primarily carried CBS soap operas and CBS' Sunday afternoon NFL coverage. At one point, this station was carried on cable systems in the Triangle region of North Carolina (Raleigh, Durham, Fayetteville, and Chapel Hill) for a time when NBC did not have a full-time affiliate in that market. At one time, WECT had a Fayetteville news bureau.

In 1969, WECT moved to a 2,000-foot (610 m) tall tower near White Lake—among the tallest east of the Mississippi. From the 1970s to the 1980s, WECT was picked up by numerous cable systems from Fayetteville eastward. At one point, it was carried on cable as far west as Wadesboro and as far north as Greenville. Due to its longstanding popularity, WECT is still carried on cable systems in the eastern portion of the Triangle market, including Fayetteville and Southern Pines. It is also available on cable in Jacksonville, which is part of the Greenville–Washington–New Bern market.

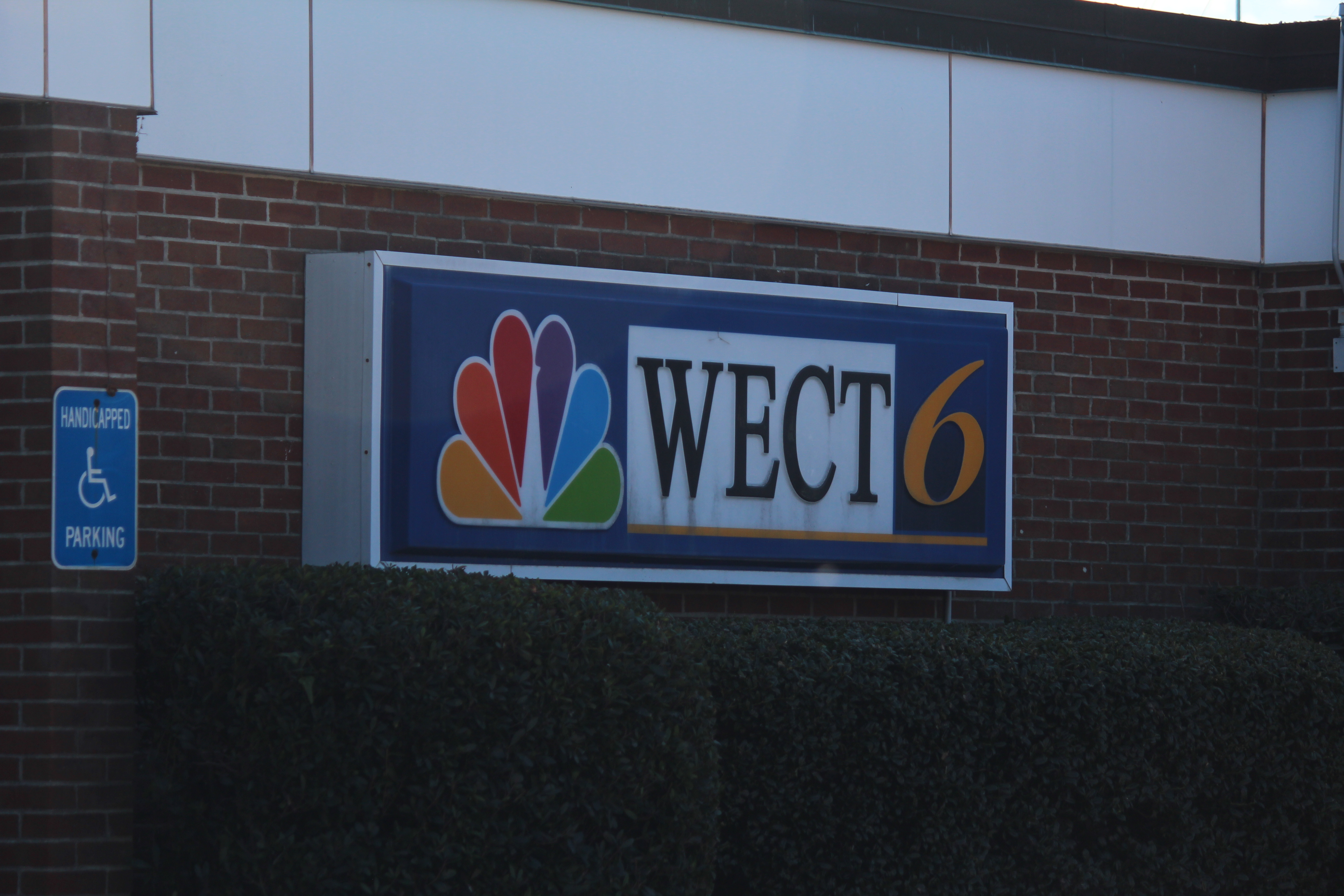
WECT and NBC logo on side of studio building

For its first half-century on the air, the station served as the default NBC affiliate for the northern and eastern portions of the Florence–Myrtle Beach, South Carolina market, including Myrtle Beach itself. That market was one of the last on the East Coast without its own NBC affiliate. It was carried on cable as far south as Georgetown, South Carolina. Well into the 1990s, it identified as "Wilmington–Fayetteville–Myrtle Beach" to acknowledge its viewership in Fayetteville and the Grand Strand. However, WECT's signal was somewhat weak on the North Carolina side of the market, such as Laurinburg.

Atlantic Telecasting sold the station to the News-Press & Gazette Company in 1986. That company then sold its entire station group to the first incarnation of New Vision Television in 1993. New Vision turned around and sold its entire group to Ellis Communications in 1995. Ellis was folded into Raycom Media in 1997. In 2006, Raycom bought out the Liberty Corporation, owner of WWAY. However, FCC duopoly rules forced Raycom to spin off WWAY to Morris Multimedia as a condition of the Raycom–Liberty merger.

=== Digital transition ===
On May 8, 2008, the FCC announced that five stations in Wilmington (including WECT) had agreed to voluntarily cease analog broadcasting on September 8 five months ahead of the February 17, 2009, tentative date for television stations to complete the analog-to-digital transition. The market was used by the FCC as a pre-transition test market. After the digital transition, WGNI radio agreed to air emergency weather information from WECT. Previously, because channel 6 is adjacent to the FM band, its broadcasts could be heard on FM 87.7.

The September 8, 2008, transition, (Note: The analog signal was kept running until the end of September to provide conversion information.) was particularly noteworthy for WECT because the digital transmitter site at Winnabow was more than 35 miles (56 km) from the White Lake tower in Bladen County. This site was closer to Wilmington but put Fayetteville—a city where WECT once maintained a news bureau—outside of the coverage area. Another area that lost WECT was Myrtle Beach, where WECT and WIS were supplanted by a new Raycom-owned NBC affiliate, WMBF-TV, which began broadcasting on August 7, 2008.

Raycom donated the White Lake tower site and 77 acres (31 ha) of land to the Green Beret Foundation in 2011. On September 20, 2012, the tower was imploded by Controlled Demolition, Inc., which did the work on a pro bono basis. At the time, it was the tallest-ever man-made structure leveled via explosive demolition. Plans called for the scrap metal and land to be sold to benefit the foundation.

=== Sale to Gray Television ===
WECT logo from 2001 to 2020. An earlier variant was used from 1995 to 2001.

On June 25, 2018, Atlanta-based Gray Television announced it had reached an agreement to merge with Raycom, with Gray as the surviving company. The cash-and-stock merger transaction valued at $3.6 billion—in which Gray shareholders would acquire preferred stock currently held by Raycom—made WECT a sister station to fellow NBC affiliate WITN-TV in Greenville. WITN-TV and WECT had briefly been sister stations when Raycom was formed in 1997. However, Raycom was forced to sell WITN to Gray in 1997 because WITN's signal has city-grade quality in the northern portion of the Wilmington market. At the time, the FCC normally did not allow one company to own two stations with overlapping signals, and would not even consider a waiver for a city-grade overlap. The sale was approved on December 20 and completed on January 2, 2019.

== News operation ==
On September 22, 2003, through a news share agreement, WECT began producing a nightly half-hour prime time newscast on WSFX (Fox 26 News at 10, now Fox Wilmington News at 10). By 2006, an hour-long extension of WECT's Carolina in the Morning at 7 a.m. had been added to the news lineup.

On August 31, 2008, WECT became Wilmington's first television outlet to upgrade local news production to high definition level and the broadcasts on WSFX were included in the change. At some point in time, WECT added a third newscast to WSFX, under the title Fox 26 News at 6:30 (later became Fox Wilmington News at 6:30). It only aired on weeknights and attempted to compete against the national evening newscasts seen on the big three networks. It would be canceled by the end of 2013 in preparation to expand the weeknight edition of the 10 p.m. show to an hour (which occurred on January 15, 2014).

After WWAY stopped producing weekend evening newscasts on August 1, 2009, WECT and WSFX became the only outlets in Wilmington to offer evening broadcasts seen seven nights a week. Although WWAY eventually reintroduced a local newscast airing Sunday nights at 11, WECT and WSFX remain the only channels in the market to air newscasts throughout the weekend. All newscasts on WSFX air from WECT's primary set but with modified duratrans indicating the Fox-branded shows.

== Subchannels ==
The station's signal is multiplexed:

Subchanels of WECT
Subchannel	Res.	Short name	Programming
6.1	1080i	WECT	NBC
6.2	480i	Bounce	Bounce TV
6.3	720p	The365	365BLK / MyNetworkTV
6.4	480i	Laff	Laff
6.5	480i	Mystery	Ion Mystery
6.6	480i	Crime	True Crime Network
6.7	480i	Oxygen	Oxygen

Prior to September 26, 2012, WECT-DT2 aired a 24-hour local weather channel with the branding "WECT Plus". The subchannel also aired repeats of the main channel's weeknight 6 and 11 p.m. newscasts as well as local traffic and travel information. Occasionally, other special programming aired on WECT-DT2. From April 15, 2005, until the end of December 2008, WECT-DT2 carried the defunct NBC Weather Plus. WECT replaced the local weather channel with Bounce TV on August 18, 2014. Escape (now Ion Mystery) was later added to a new subchannel.
