= List of television stations in North Carolina =

This is a list of broadcast television stations that are licensed in the U.S. state of North Carolina.

== Full-power ==
- Stations are arranged by media market served and channel position.

Full-power television stations in North Carolina
| Media market | Station | Channel | Primary affiliation(s) | Notes | Refs |
|---|---|---|---|---|---|
| Charlotte | WBTV | 3 | CBS | | |
| Charlotte | WSOC-TV | 9 | ABC, Telemundo on 9.2 | | |
| Charlotte | WWJS | 14 | Independent | (Note: Licensed to Hickory, North Carolina.) | |
| Charlotte | WUNE-TV | 17 | The Explorer Channel, PBS on 17.2 | (Note: Licensed to Linville, North Carolina.) (Note: Satellite of WUNC-TV.) | |
| Charlotte | WCCB | 18 | Independent | | |
| Charlotte | WCNC-TV | 36 | NBC | | |
| Charlotte | WTVI | 42 | PBS | | |
| Charlotte | WJZY | 46 | Fox | (Note: Licensed to Belmont, North Carolina.) | |
| Charlotte | WMYT-TV | 55 | The CW | (Note: Licensed to Rock Hill, South Carolina.) | |
| Charlotte | WUNG-TV | 58 | PBS | (Note: Licensed to Concord, North Carolina.) | |
| Charlotte | WAXN-TV | 64 | Independent | (Note: Licensed to Kannapolis, North Carolina.) | |
| Greensboro | WFMY-TV | 2 | CBS | | |
| Greensboro | WGHP | 8 | Fox | (Note: Licensed to High Point, North Carolina.) | |
| Greensboro | WXII-TV | 12 | NBC | (Note: Licensed to Winston-Salem, North Carolina.) | |
| Greensboro | WGPX-TV | 16 | Ion Television | (Note: Licensed to Burlington, North Carolina.) | |
| Greensboro | WCWG | 20 | The CW | (Note: Licensed to Lexington, North Carolina.) | |
| Greensboro | WUNL-TV | 26 | PBS | | |
| Greensboro | WXLV-TV | 45 | ABC | | |
| Greensboro | WMYV | 48 | MyNetworkTV | | |
| Greenville | WITN-TV | 7 | NBC, MyNetworkTV on 7.2 | (Note: Licensed to Washington, North Carolina.) | |
| Greenville | WNCT-TV | 9 | CBS, The CW on 9.2 | | |
| Greenville | WCTI-TV | 12 | ABC, Fox on 12.2 | (Note: Licensed to New Bern, North Carolina.) | |
| Greenville | WYDO | 14 | Roar | | |
| Greenville | WUNM-TV | 19 | The Explorer Channel, PBS on 19.2 | (Note: Licensed to Jacksonville, North Carolina.) | |
| Greenville | WUNK-TV | 25 | PBS | | |
| Greenville | WPXU-TV | 35 | Ion Television | | |
| Greenville | WEPX-TV | 38 | Ion Television | | |
| Raleigh–Durham | WUNC-TV | 4 | PBS | (Note: Licensed to Chapel Hill, North Carolina.) | |
| Raleigh–Durham | WRAL-TV | 5 | NBC | | |
| Raleigh–Durham | WTVD | 11 | ABC | | |
| Raleigh–Durham | WNCN | 17 | CBS | (Note: Licensed to Goldsboro, North Carolina.) | |
| Raleigh–Durham | WLFL | 22 | The CW | | |
| Raleigh–Durham | WRDC | 28 | MyNetworkTV | | |
| Raleigh–Durham | WRAY-TV | 30 | TCT | (Note: Licensed to Wilson, North Carolina.) | |
| Raleigh–Durham | WUNP-TV | 36 | The Explorer Channel, PBS on 36.2 | (Note: Licensed to Roanoke Rapids, North Carolina.) | |
| Raleigh–Durham | WUVC-DT | 40 | Univision, UniMás on 40.2 | (Note: Licensed to Fayetteville, North Carolina.) | |
| Raleigh–Durham | WRPX-TV | 47 | Ion Television | (Note: Licensed to Rocky Mount, North Carolina.) | |
| Raleigh–Durham | WRAZ | 50 | Fox | | |
| Raleigh–Durham | WFPX-TV | 62 | Bounce TV | | |
| Wilmington | WWAY | 3 | ABC, CBS on 3.2, The CW on 3.3 | | |
| Wilmington | WECT | 6 | NBC | | |
| Wilmington | WSFX-TV | 26 | Fox | | |
| Wilmington | WUNJ-TV | 39 | PBS | | |
| ~Greenville, SC | WLOS | 13 | ABC, MyNetworkTV on 13.2 | (Note: Licensed to Asheville, North Carolina.) | |
| ~Greenville, SC | WUNW | 27 | The Explorer Channel, PBS on 27.2 | (Note: Licensed to Canton, North Carolina.) | |
| ~Greenville, SC | WUNF-TV | 33 | PBS | | |
| ~Greenville, SC | WYCW | 62 | Independent | | |
| ~Myrtle Beach, SC | WUNU | 31 | PBS | (Note: Licensed to Lumberton, North Carolina.) | |
| ~Norfolk, VA | WUND-TV | 2 | PBS | (Note: Licensed to Edenton, North Carolina.) | |
| ~Norfolk, VA | WSKY-TV | 4 | Independent | (Note: Licensed to Manteo, North Carolina.) | |

== Low-power ==
Low-power television stations in North Carolina
| Media market | Station | Channel | Primary affiliation(s) | Notes | Refs |
|---|---|---|---|---|---|
| Charlotte | WCEE-LD | 16 | Quiero TV | | |
| Charlotte | W15EB-D | 21 | Various | | |
| Charlotte | WVEB-LD | 22 | Infomercials | | |
| Charlotte | WDMC-LD | 25 | Daystar | | |
| Charlotte | WGTB-CD | 28 | The Walk TV | | |
| Charlotte | WHEH-LD | 41 | Various | | |
| Greensboro | WGSR-LD | 19 | Independent | (Note: Licensed to Reidsville, North Carolina.) | |
| Greensboro | WHWD-LD | 21 | Daystar | | |
| Greensboro | WACN-LD | 34 | Daystar | (Note: Licensed to Raleigh, North Carolina.) | |
| Greenville | W18EV-D | 18 | [Blank] | | |
| Greenville | W22FC-D | 18 | [Blank] | | |
| Greenville | W20EM-D | 20 | [Blank] | | |
| Greenville | W27DP-D | 27 | Telemundo | | |
| Greenville | WJGC-LD | 33 | Various | | |
| Greenville | W22EY-D | 41 | 3ABN | | |
| Greenville | W35DW-D | 45 | Various | | |
| Greenville | WNGS-LD | 50 | Various | | |
| Raleigh–Durham | WAUG-LD | 8 | Independent | | |
| Raleigh–Durham | WDRH-LD | 16 | Various | | |
| Raleigh–Durham | WNCB-LD | 16 | Various | | |
| Raleigh–Durham | WARZ-LD | 21 | Religious independent | (Note: Licensed to Smithfield, North Carolina.) | |
| Raleigh–Durham | WNCR-LD | 21 | [Blank] | (Note: Licensed to Tarboro, North Carolina.) | |
| Raleigh–Durham | W36FG-D | 24 | Silent | | |
| Raleigh–Durham | WIRP-LD | 27 | Various | | |
| Raleigh–Durham | WUBX-CD | 31 | Various | | |
| Raleigh–Durham | WHIG-CD | 31 | Local programming | | |
| Raleigh–Durham | WNGT-CD | 34 | Independent | | |
| Raleigh–Durham | WHFL-CD | 43 | Religious independent | | |
| Raleigh–Durham | WYBE-CD | 44 | Local programming | (Note: Licensed to Pinehurst, North Carolina.) | |
| Raleigh–Durham | WDRN-LD | 45 | Daystar | | |
| Raleigh–Durham | W33EI-D | 46 | HSN | | |
| Raleigh–Durham | WBFT-CD | 46 | TCT | (Note: Licensed to Sanford, North Carolina.) | |
| Raleigh–Durham | WRTD-CD | 54 | Telemundo | | |
| Raleigh–Durham | WWIW-LD | 66 | Daystar | | |
| Wilmington | WWAY-LD | 4 | Ion Plus | | |
| Wilmington | WILM-LD | 10 | Independent | | |
| Wilmington | W19EU-D | 28 | [Blank] | | |
| Wilmington | WTWL-LD | 31 | Telemundo | | |
| Wilmington | WIDO-LD | 34 | 365BLK | | |
| Wilmington | WQDH-LD | 49 | Various | | |
| ~Greenville, SC | WDKT-LD | 31 | Telemundo | (Note: Licensed to Hendersonville, North Carolina.) | |
| ~Myrtle Beach, SC | WPEM-LD | 47 | Religious | | |
| ~Norfolk, VA | W26EY-D | 45 | YouToo America | | |

== Translators ==
Television station translators in North Carolina
| Media market | Station | Channel | Translating | Notes | Refs |
|---|---|---|---|---|---|
| Charlotte | W26FA-D | 6 | WSOC-TV | (Note: Licensed to Marion, North Carolina.) | |
| Charlotte | WSOC-CR | 9.5 | WSOC-TV | (Note: Licensed to Shelby, North Carolina.) | |
| Charlotte | WSOC-ST | 9.9 | WSOC-TV | (Note: Licensed to Statesville, North Carolina.) | |
| Charlotte | W34FH-D | 18.11 | WCCB | | |
| Charlotte | W36FB-D | 36 | WCNC-TV | (Note: Licensed to Biscoe, North Carolina.) | |
| Charlotte | WAXN-CG | 64 | WAXN-TV | (Note: Licensed to China Grove, North Carolina.) | |
| Greenville | WTGC-LD | 7 | WITN-TV | | |
| Greenville | W15DY-D | 13 | WLOS | | |
| Raleigh–Durham | WTNC-LD | 26 | WUVC-DT | | |
| Western North Carolina | W03AK-D | 4 | WYFF | (Note: Licensed to Ela, North Carolina.) | |
| Western North Carolina | W04DW-D | 4 | WYFF | (Note: Licensed to Sylva, North Carolina.) | |
| Western North Carolina | W05AR-D | 4 | WYFF | (Note: Licensed to Bryson City, North Carolina.) | |
| Western North Carolina | W06AJ-D | 4 | WYFF | (Note: Licensed to Franklin, North Carolina.) | |
| Western North Carolina | W10AL-D | 4 | WYFF | (Note: Licensed to Cherokee, North Carolina.) | |
| Western North Carolina | W10DF-D | 4 | WYFF | | |
| Western North Carolina | W08AT-D | 7 | WSPA-TV | | |
| Western North Carolina | W09AF-D | 7 | WSPA-TV | | |
| Western North Carolina | W09AG-D | 7 | WSPA-TV | | |
| Western North Carolina | W11AN-D | 7 | WSPA-TV | | |
| Western North Carolina | W23EY-D | 7 | WSPA-TV | | |
| Western North Carolina | W11AJ-D | 13 | WLOS | | |
| Western North Carolina | W12AR-D | 13 | WLOS | (Note: Licensed to Waynesville, North Carolina.) | |
| Western North Carolina | W14EG-D | 13 | WLOS | (Note: Licensed to Robbinsville, North Carolina.) | |
| Western North Carolina | W15DR-D | 13 | WLOS | (Note: Licensed to Maggie Valley, North Carolina.) | |
| Western North Carolina | W17DS-D | 13 | WLOS | | |
| Western North Carolina | W30DX-D | 13 | WLOS | | |
| Western North Carolina | W15CW-D | 21 | WHNS | | |
| Western North Carolina | W21DV-D | 21 | WHNS | | |
| Western North Carolina | W23EZ-D | 21 | WHNS | | |
| Western North Carolina | W26FB-D | 21 | WHNS | | |
| Western North Carolina | W19DB-D | 33 | WUNF-TV | | |
| Western North Carolina | W20EK-D | 33 | WUNF-TV | (Note: Licensed to Andrews, North Carolina.) | |
| Western North Carolina | W28EE-D | 33 | WUNF-TV | | |
| Western North Carolina | W29DE-D | 33 | WUNF-TV | (Note: Licensed to Hayesville, North Carolina.) | |
| Western North Carolina | W31AN-D | 33 | WUNF-TV | (Note: Licensed to Murphy, North Carolina.) | |
| Western North Carolina | W31DH-D | 33 | WUNF-TV | | |
| Western North Carolina | W35CK-D | 33 | WUNF-TV | (Note: Licensed to Highlands, North Carolina.) | |
| Wilmington | W30ER-D | 10 | WILM-LD | | |
| Wilmington | W11DR-D | 11 | W22FN-D | | |
| Wilmington | W17DO-D | 17 | W22FN-D | | |
| Wilmington | W20EY-D | 20 | W22FN-D | | |
| Wilmington | W22FN-D | 22 | WBPI-CD | | |
| Wilmington | WILT-LD | 24 | WILM-LD | | |
| ~Greenville, SC | W07DS-D | 4 | WYFF | (Note: Licensed to Burnsville, North Carolina.) | |
| ~Greenville, SC | W07DT-D | 4 | WYFF | (Note: Licensed to Tryon, North Carolina.) | |
| ~Greenville, SC | W18EP-D | 7 | WSPA-TV | (Note: Licensed to Weaverville, North Carolina.) | |
| ~Greenville, SC | W32FI-D | 7 | WSPA-TV | (Note: Licensed to Brevard, North Carolina.) | |
| ~Greenville, SC | W35DT-D | 7 | WSPA-TV | (Note: Licensed to Beaver Dam, North Carolina.) | |
| ~Greenville, SC | W15EL-D | 7 | WSPA-TV | (Note: Licensed to Mars Hill, North Carolina.) | |
| ~Greenville, SC | W23ES-D | 7 | WSPA-TV | (Note: Licensed to Marshall, North Carolina.) | |
| ~Greenville, SC | W10AD-D | 7 | WSPA-TV | (Note: Licensed to Montreat, North Carolina.) | |
| ~Greenville, SC | W12AQ-D | 13 | WLOS | (Note: Licensed to Black Mountain, North Carolina.) | |
| ~Greenville, SC | W12CI-D | 13 | WLOS | (Note: Licensed to Hot Springs, North Carolina.) | |
| ~Greenville, SC | W32EO-D | 13 | WLOS | | |
| ~Greenville, SC | W34EP-D | 13 | WLOS | (Note: Licensed to Sapphire Valley, North Carolina.) | |
| ~Greenville, SC | W22FB-D | 17 | WUNE-TV | | |
| ~Greenville, SC | W29FE-D | 17 | WUNE-TV | (Note: Licensed to Bat Cave, North Carolina.) | |
| ~Greenville, SC | W34DX-D | 21 | WHNS | (Note: Licensed to West Asheville, North Carolina.) | |
| ~Greenville, SC | W33EH-D | 33 | WUNF-TV | | |
| ~Greenville, SC | W35CO-D | 33 | WUNF-TV | | |
| ~Greenville, SC | W16DZ-D | 58 | WUNG-TV | | |
| ~Greenville, SC | W31DI-D | 58 | WUNG-TV | (Note: Licensed to Spruce Pine, North Carolina.) | |
| ~Myrtle Beach, SC | W17EE-D | 36 | WCNC-TV | (Note: Licensed to Lilesville and Wadesboro, North Carolina.) | |
| ~Johnson City, TN | W30CS-D | 26 | WUNL-TV | (Note: Licensed to Zionville, North Carolina.) | |
| ~Johnson City, TN | W30EF-D | 58 | WUNG-TV | (Note: Licensed to Jefferson, North Carolina.) | |

== Defunct ==
- WFLB-TV Fayetteville (1955–1958)
- WFXI Morehead City (1988–2017)
- WISE-TV Asheville (1953–1978)
- WNAO-TV Raleigh (1953–1957)
- WTOB-TV Winston-Salem (1953–1957)
- WUBC Greensboro (1967–1970)

== See also ==
- North Carolina § Media

== Bibliography ==
- "United States TV Stations: North Carolina", Yearbook of Radio and Television, New York: Radio Television Daily, 1964, OCLC 7469377 – via Internet Archive
- Williams, Wiley J. (2006), William S. Powell (ed.), "Television Stations", Encyclopedia of North Carolina, University of North Carolina Press
