= WWAY =

Television station in Wilmington, North Carolina

- WWAY's logo; depending on the channel, the ABC or CBS logo is shown to the right of the "3" on-air.

- Wilmington, North Carolina; United States
- Channels: Digital: 24 (UHF); Virtual: 3
- Branding: WWAY-TV 3, WWAY News; WWAY ABC (3.1); WWAY CBS (3.2); Cape Fear CW (3.3)

Programming
- Affiliations: 3.1: ABC; 3.2: CBS; 3.3: CW+; for others, see § Subchannels

Ownership
- Owner: Morris Multimedia; (WWAY-TV, LLC)

History
- First air date: October 30, 1964
- Former channel numbers: Analog: 3 (VHF, 1964–2008); Digital: 46 (UHF, until 2020)
- Call sign meaning: "Wonderful Watching All Year"

Technical information
- Licensing authority: FCC
- Facility ID: 12033
- ERP: 700 kW
- HAAT: 592.2 m (1,943 ft)
- Transmitter coordinates: 34°7′54″N 78°11′16″W

Links
- Public license information: Public file; LMS
- Website: www.wwaytv3.com

WWAY (channel 3) is a television station in Wilmington, North Carolina, United States, affiliated with ABC, CBS, and The CW Plus. Owned by Morris Multimedia, the station has studios on Magnolia Village Way in Leland, and its transmitter is located west of Winnabow in Town Creek Township.

== History ==
WWAY signed on the air on October 30, 1964, as the second television station in Wilmington, 10 1/2 years after WECT (channel 6). It was originally owned by Cape Fear Telecasting, a firm controlled by local interests. The station's first studios were located on the 10th floor of the Murchison Building in downtown Wilmington.

Previously, primary NBC affiliate WECT had shoehorned all three networks onto its schedule. Thus, WWAY should have logically signed on as a CBS affiliate. However, it has been an ABC affiliate from the very first day. This was somewhat unusual for a two-station market, especially one of Wilmington's size. For most of its first 20 years in television, ABC, as the smallest and weakest of the Big Three networks, was relegated to secondary status on existing stations in most two-station markets. However, at the time channel 3 signed on, no ABC affiliate put even a grade B signal into Wilmington. In contrast, WBTW in Florence, South Carolina, put a fairly strong grade B signal into the area. While WECT continued to cherry-pick CBS programming, WBTW remained CBS's affiliate of record for southeastern North Carolina until WJKA-TV (channel 26, now WSFX-TV, a Fox affiliate) signed on 20 years later; the former continued to serve some portions of the market until WILM-LD switched its affiliation to CBS in 2000. Cape Fear thus figured that if it signed with ABC, it would not get much local competition.

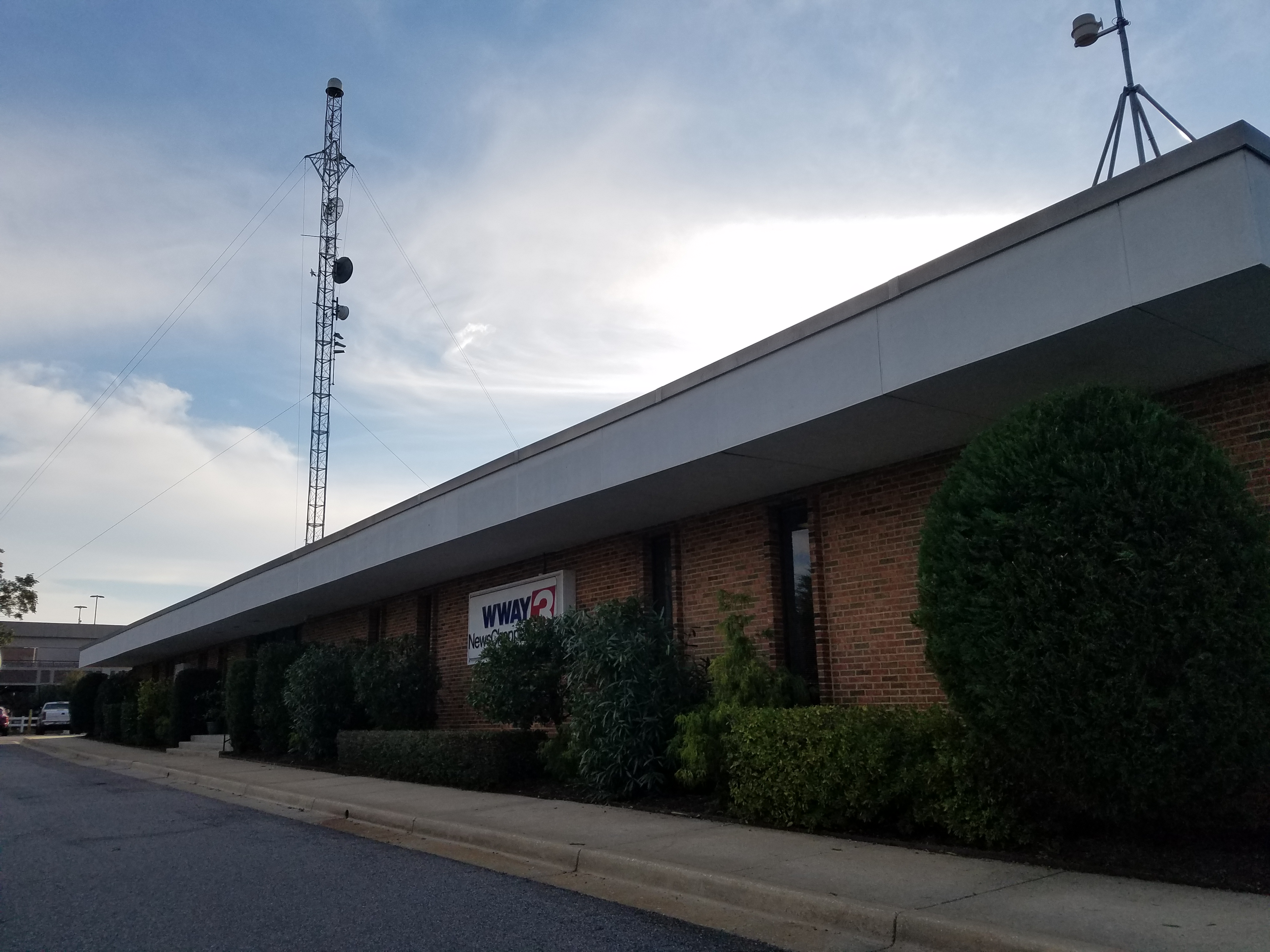
WWAY's former studios in downtown Wilmington.

Cape Fear sold WWAY to Clay Broadcasting (later to become Clay Communications) in 1968. In 1969, the station moved its studios to a new building a few blocks north on Front Street that was the first piece of a redevelopment of the north end of downtown. In 1981, a military jet destroyed the WWAY broadcast tower near Winnabow. The tower was replaced with one nearly 2,000 feet (610 m) tall. As part of the divestiture of the company's newspaper and television properties, on April 30, 1987, Clay sold its WWAY and its four sister television stations—NBC affiliates KJAC-TV (now Roar affiliate KBTV-TV) in Beaumont–Port Arthur, Texas, KFDX-TV in Wichita Falls, Texas, and ABC affiliate WAPT in Jackson, Mississippi—to New York City–based Price Communications Corporation for $60 million; the sale was approved by the FCC on June 23. In 1988, Price sold WWAY to Adams Communications. Adams then sold the station to CLG Media in 1993, who then flipped it to Hillside Broadcasting in 1995. Hillside then sold WWAY to Cosmos Broadcasting, a subsidiary of the Liberty Corporation, in 1999. That company sold off its insurance interests two years later, bringing WWAY directly under the Liberty banner. In 2004, WWAY, following the lead of then-owner Liberty's ABC-affiliated stations, preempted a showing of the 1998 movie Saving Private Ryan.

In 2005, Liberty merged with Raycom Media, which already owned WECT. That company could not keep both stations as Federal Communications Commission (FCC) duopoly rules do not allow common ownership of two of the four largest stations in a single market. (In addition, the Wilmington market has only four full-power stations, prohibiting a duopoly in any event.) As a result, Raycom opted to keep the longer-established and higher-rated WECT and spun off WWAY to current owner Morris Multimedia in 2006. However, the station retained the Liberty-era logo that was introduced in 2003. On May 8, 2008, the FCC announced that Wilmington had been selected as a test market for the 2009 national digital television transition. Five stations in Wilmington, including WWAY, also agreed to voluntarily cease analog broadcasting on September 8. Channel 3 made its transition from analog to digital at Noon on that date. On June 15, WWAY started broadcasting the Retro Television Network on its second digital channel. This had previously served as a 24-hour local weather channel.

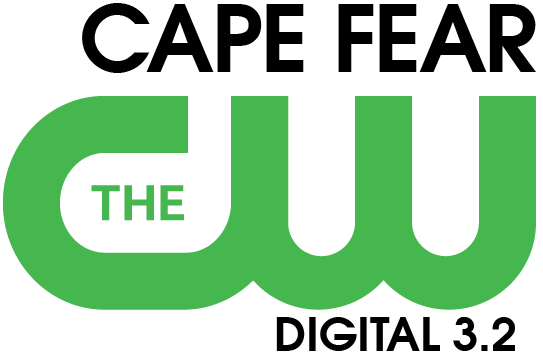
WWAY-DT2's former CW logo before moving to WWAY-DT3, dropping Cozi TV.

In September 2013, WWAY announced that it would add The CW on a digital subchannel. The new channel launched on September 30, 2013, under the branding "Cape Fear CW". The addition of The CW pushed RTV to channel 3.3, before Cozi TV took over the tertiary frequency in January 2015. On March 30, 2016, CBS announced that it would move its local affiliation to WWAY-DT2 from WILM-LD on January 1, 2017. The move shifted Cape Fear CW to 3.3, thereby bumping Cozi TV from that spot.

In March 2017, the station's parent announced the purchase of the former Thunder Alley bowling center in Leland, to be converted to the station's new state-of-the-art broadcast studios. On April 29, 2018, WWAY began on-air programming from the Leland facilities at 1224 Magnolia Village Way, completing the move from the 615 North Front Street studios in Downtown Wilmington that the station had occupied since 1969.

== News operation ==
In January 1984, WWAY launched an early morning show known as Good Morning Carolina. The show was devoted to national and regional news, musical segments and interviews.

On August 5, 1984, WWAY announced that it would add a 5:30 p.m. newscast known as The Carolinas at 5:30, a program different from other newscasts, focusing on reports from the North Carolina News Network. The station began airing the newscast on September 3.

In May 1989, the 6 p.m. newscast began simulcasting on radio stations WTXY and WLSQ, reaching communities such as Whiteville and Loris.

Rival WECT has been the longtime market leader in terms of attaining consistent viewership and higher Nielsen ratings. WWAY is the only other Wilmington station that produces local news since WILM-LD did not operate a news department of its own while it was affiliated with CBS (unlike most big three network-affiliated television stations). However, that outlet does simulcast some newscasts from WRAL-TV in Raleigh with Wilmington-specific weather inserts (that are taped in advance), but there is no news coverage of the Cape Fear region. In order to provide WILM with more localized coverage, a news share agreement was established with WWAY allowing this ABC outlet to produce a live newscast on weeknights at 7 p.m. This half-hour production aired from March 10, 2008, until February 27, 2009.

On August 1, 2009, WWAY stopped airing weekend newscasts, leaving WECT as the only option for viewers. Although it would eventually bring back a Sunday night show at 11 p.m. on October 3, 2010, WECT retained its ratings and viewership dominance throughout all dayparts. On January 6, 2014, WWAY launched a thirty-minute weeknight newscast on WWAY-DT2 under the title Cape Fear CW Primetime News at 10. This was the first competition to Fox affiliate WSFX-TV, which has a well-established nightly newscast at 10 p.m. produced by WECT. Unlike most ABC outlets, WWAY does not air a full two-hour weekday morning show (its Good Morning Carolina program is only seen from 5:30 a.m. until 7 a.m.). It also does not carry a 4 p.m. newscast during the week. WWAY is one of a few ABC affiliates to air paid programming on weekday mornings and afternoons.

On January 2, 2017, WWAY began producing a midday newscast and a full-hour 7 p.m. newscast for WWAY-DT2, when the subchannel became a CBS affiliate. The 10 p.m. newscast on WWAY-DT2 moved with the rest of the CW Plus schedule to WWAY-DT3. In addition, WWAY-DT2 simulcasts all of the main WWAY subchannel's other newscasts.

=== Notable current on–air staff ===
- Brett Blizzard – Full Court Press host (sports)
- Trot Nixon – Fifth Quarter host (sports)

== Subchannels ==
The station's signal is multiplexed:

Subchannels of WWAY
Subchannel	Res.	Short name	Programming
3.1	720p	WWAYABC	ABC
3.2	1080i	WWAYCBS	CBS
3.3	720p	WWAYCW	The CW Plus
3.4	480i	Ion+	Ion Plus
3.5	480i	START	Start TV

After CBS moved to WWAY-DT2 from WILM-LD (which became an independent station with a secondary affiliation with MeTV), the multiplex bandwidth was switched around so that the main ABC signal continued to be carried in 720p, with WWAY-DT2 broadcasting in CBS' default 1080i resolution. In August 2021, WWAY-DT3's CW feed was upgraded to high definition. Prior to this, the feed was only carried in HD on select cable providers.
