= WSFX-TV =

Television station in Wilmington, North Carolina

- Wilmington, North Carolina; United States
- Channels: Digital: 29 (UHF); Virtual: 26
- Branding: Fox Wilmington

Programming
- Affiliations: 26.1: Fox; for others, see § Subchannels

Ownership
- Owner: Gray Media; (Gray Television Licensee, LLC)
- Sister stations: WECT, WTWL-LD

History
- First air date: September 24, 1984
- Former call signs: WJKA (1984–1994)
- Former channel numbers: Analog: 26 (UHF, 1984–2008); Digital: 30 (UHF, 2002–2020)
- Former affiliations: CBS (1984–1994); UPN (secondary, 2001–2004)
- Call sign meaning: "SuperFox" (former branding)

Technical information
- Licensing authority: FCC
- Facility ID: 72871
- ERP: 240 kW
- HAAT: 592.2 m (1,943 ft)
- Transmitter coordinates: 34°7′54″N 78°11′16″W

Links
- Public license information: Public file; LMS
- Website: foxwilmington.com

WSFX-TV (channel 26) is a television station in Wilmington, North Carolina, United States, affiliated with the Fox network. It is owned by Gray Media alongside NBC affiliate WECT (channel 6) and Telemundo affiliate WTWL-LD (channel 31). The three stations share studios on Shipyard Boulevard in Wilmington; WSFX-TV's transmitter is located near Winnabow, North Carolina.

Channel 26 went on the air September 24, 1984, as WJKA, Wilmington's third commercial TV station. Originally a CBS affiliate owned by the Everett family and other investors and named for its lawyer in Washington, D.C., it struggled amid widespread viewer loyalty to Wilmington's established WWAY and WECT in local programming and competition from as many as three CBS affiliates offered by local cable systems. Various attempts at local news programming, most notably a news department that lasted for nine and a half months in 1990, ended due to low ratings. In 1994, WJKA became WSFX-TV "Superfox", the area's only Fox affiliate, with a service area that at its height included Myrtle Beach, South Carolina. The station resumed producing a newscast, this time at 10 p.m. Southeastern Media Holdings acquired WSFX-TV in 2003 and initiated a services agreement with WECT, with that station assuming local newscast production duties and expanding news on channel 26 beyond 10 p.m. to include morning and 7 p.m. newscasts.

== WJKA: CBS for Wilmington ==
In 1981, two groups applied to the Federal Communications Commission (FCC) to build a new television station on channel 29 in Wilmington. Cape Fear Television proposed a CBS affiliate, while Wilmington Telecasters—a consortium of North Carolina businessmen including Robinson and Katherine Everett—originally proposed an independent station similar to a sister property, WGGT in Greensboro, North Carolina. Wilmington lacked a CBS affiliate; local cable providers rebroadcast either WBTW from Florence, South Carolina, or WTVD from Durham, North Carolina, to their subscribers. The two parties reached an agreement, approved in April 1982, that granted Wilmington's application and gave Cape Fear Television an option to purchase a 30-percent stake. Wilmington Telecasters in turn successfully petitioned the FCC to change its channel allocation from 29 to 26.

By March 1984, Wilmington Telecasters's station had made several steps forward. It took the call sign WJKA, drawing from the initials of its attorney in Washington, D.C., which was said to be temporary and likely to change for launch. In addition, Wilmington Telecasters had signed a network affiliation agreement with CBS and agreed to share the tower of ABC affiliate WWAY near Bolivia, North Carolina. The new station selected a site on Oleander Drive to build its studios. After delays attributable to construction and Hurricane Diana, WJKA signed on September 24, 1984. Its main immediate effect was to make available CBS and a variety of syndicated programs previously only available to households with cable. WJKA debuted without local newscasts, largely because it expected viewers to stick with the long-established and familiar news offerings of WWAY and WECT, but eased its way into local programming. Its first effort was Midday, a noontime news and talk show that debuted in January 1986. After two years, Midday was retooled and moved to 5 p.m. under the title Live at Five. Station management hoped that being the market's first early evening newscast would attract viewers, but ratings proved them wrong, and the newscast was canceled after 15 weeks.

In October 1988, Wilmington Telecasters agreed to sell the station to Park Communications, which proposed to operate WJKA as a semi-satellite of WNCT-TV, the CBS affiliate in Greenville, North Carolina. Park announced plans to expand local programming at WJKA and add coverage of Wilmington events to WNCT-TV's newscasts. This was not enough to prevent protests from WWAY, as well as WNCT-TV's northeastern North Carolina competitors, WITN-TV and WCTI-TV. The stations contended that the signals of WNCT-TV and WJKA had excessive overlap in five counties and that the combination would create unfair competition as it would be cheaper to run and serve two television markets; Park countered, noting that WJKA was challenged competing with WECT and WWAY and that no other buyer had emerged who could make necessary signal upgrades. The FCC ruled in November 1989 that it was unlikely to approve Park's purchase of WJKA, finding that the transaction would effectively take away a full-service TV station from Wilmington and that WJKA had made progress in reducing its annual losses.

WJKA management was then able to move ahead with a project that had been slated since 1987: starting a news department. The station made a second attempt at local newscasts beginning March 5, 1990, this time competing at 6 and 11 p.m. Action News 26 sought to differentiate itself from WECT and WWAY by emphasizing Wilmington metro-area news, largely matching its smaller coverage area and fewer resources. The news department was led by Tedd O'Donnell, who had worked for 15 years at WISC-TV in Madison, Wisconsin. Ratings surveys showed that the newscasts had few viewers. In May 1990, at 6 p.m., WJKA had a 3% share in the full area of dominant influence (ADI) and a 7% share in the metro area of New Hanover and Brunswick counties. By comparison, WECT—the traditional full-market leader—had a 42% ADI share and 27% metro share, and WWAY—the regular ratings leader in Wilmington proper—had a 29% ADI share and 51% metro share. The November survey showed no improvement, and WJKA discontinued Action News 26 after the December 21, 1990 broadcast, laying off 20 employees, which was about half the staff. General manager Ty Watts told the Wilmington Morning Star, "We have now found out that the market is too small to support three 6 and 11 o'clock news programs."

== WSFX-TV: Fox for Wilmington ==
On April 14, 1994, WJKA announced it would change affiliations from CBS to Fox on September 19 of that year, in time for the new television season. As part of the affiliation change, WJKA changed its call sign to WSFX-TV for "Superfox", aiming to capitalize on its status as the only Fox affiliate available in the Wilmington area and as far south as Myrtle Beach, South Carolina. Previously, Fox had only been available to cable subscribers in both areas. This was in contrast to the situation WJKA had faced as a CBS affiliate, overlapping WRAL-TV (replacing WTVD), WNCT-TV, and WBTW. Several factors motivated the Everetts to switch, not just in Wilmington but at KECY-TV in El Centro, California, including CBS's insistence that the stations restore previously unsuccessful news operations; a desire for more network compensation in Wilmington; and particularly CBS's refusal to make KECY-TV translator "KDBA" the CBS affiliate of record for Palm Springs, California, because it felt cable coverage of Los Angeles station KCBS-TV was adequate. CBS was left with a low-power station, W10BZ, rebroadcasting WNCT-TV's programming for the benefit of Wilmington viewers without cable. The agreement, which prevented WWMB from becoming the Florence–Myrtle Beach Fox affiliate, was partly motivated by WSFX's plans for transmitter facility improvement to cover the Myrtle Beach area—plans that never came to fruition. WSFX-TV lost rights to the Myrtle Beach area when that city's WGSE (channel 43) became Fox affiliate WFXB on November 10, 1996. That station was owned by Greg Everett, son of Robinson Everett.

Under general pressure from Fox, the station began a return to producing local news programming. In March 2000, the station began airing local sports segments; though plans for a 10 p.m. newscast were postponed, the newscast was on the air by January 2001. Later that year, WSFX became a secondary affiliate of UPN, airing Buffy the Vampire Slayer, Roswell, and Star Trek: Enterprise. WILM-LP (the former W10BZ) had previously been a secondary UPN affiliate but discontinued the programming due to low ratings. At the time, due to technical limitations imposed by the network, no UPN affiliate was available on cable in Wilmington. WILM reclaimed the UPN affiliation in 2004.

=== Common operation with WECT ===
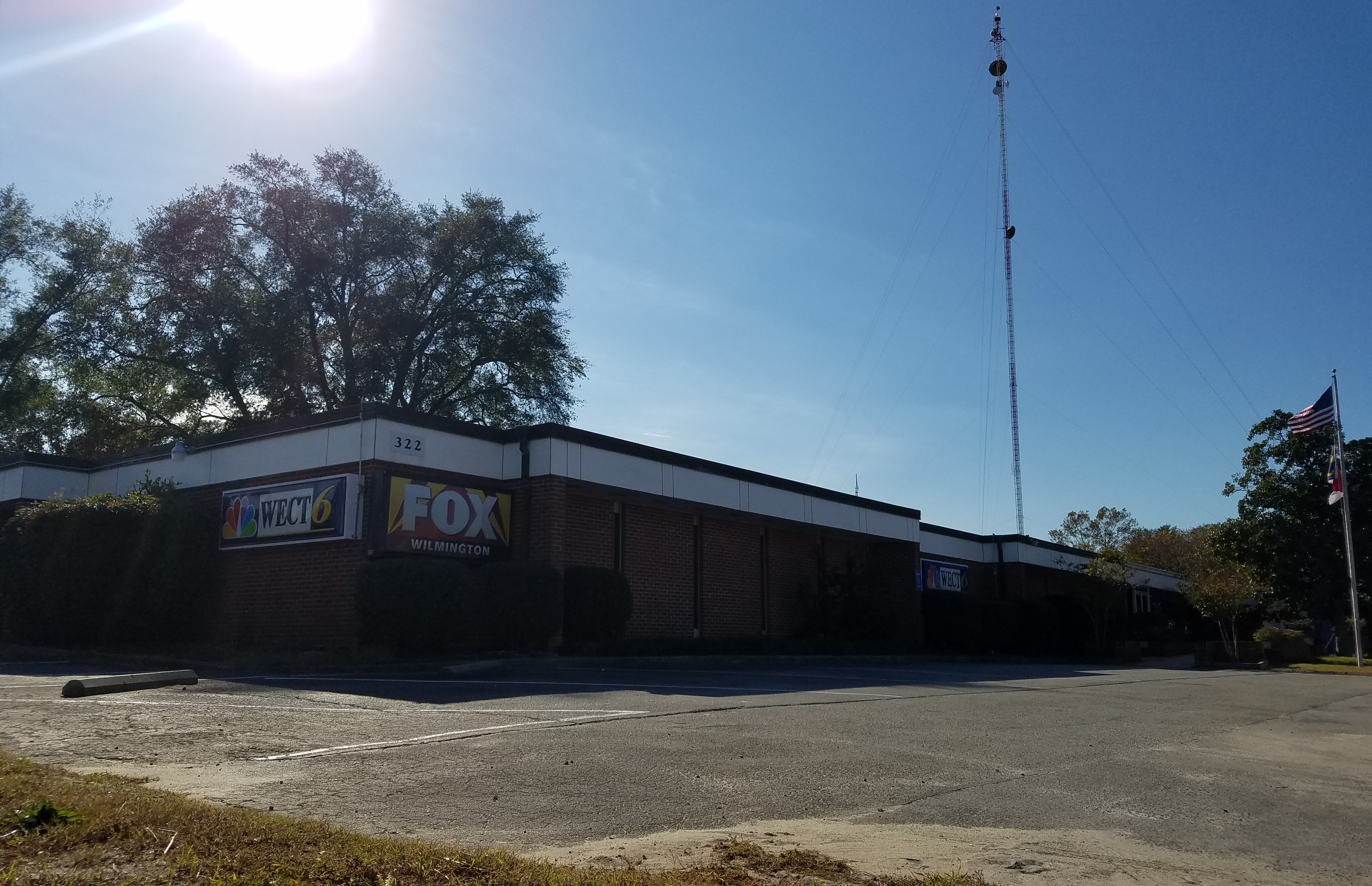
WECT and WSFX headquarters in Wilmington, North Carolina

In 2003, the Everett family sold the station to Southeastern Media Holdings. Raycom Media then took over WSFX's operations through a shared service agreement with WECT. Beginning September 22, 2003, WECT produced WSFX's 10 p.m. newscast; channel 26 began sharing news, engineering, and promotion staff, and its separate sales unit began working out of WECT's facility. By 2006, an hour-long extension of WECT's Carolina in the Morning at 7 a.m. had been added to the news lineup.

WSFX and three other commercial TV stations in Wilmington participated in an early digital switchover on September 8, 2008, to serve as a test market for the 2009 national transition to digital television. In 2011, Community Newspaper Holdings sold Southeastern Media Holdings and its four stations (including WSFX-TV) to Thomas Henson and his American Spirit Media for $24 million and the assumption of $50 million in debt.

In 2024, WSFX reached an agreement with the University of North Carolina Wilmington to broadcast select men's basketball games and a coach's show. By that year, the station was airing 13 1/2 hours of news a week, consisting of the extended Carolina in the Morning; a 7 p.m. newscast on weeknights; and the 10 p.m. news (a full hour on weeknights, half an hour on weekends).

Gray Media announced on July 1, 2026, that it would buy American Spirit Media's six stations, including WSFX, for $50 million; the deal was permissible because of the 2025 federal appeals court decision Zimmer Radio of Mid-Missouri v. FCC, which struck down limitations on one company owning two of the top four stations in a market.

== Subchannels ==
WSFX-TV's transmitter is located near Winnabow, North Carolina. The station's signal is multiplexed:

Subchannels of WSFX-TV
Subchannel	Res.	Short name	Programming
26.1	720p	WSFX-DT	Fox
26.2	480i	CourtTV	Court TV
26.3	480i	Grit	Grit
26.4	480i	ION	Ion
26.5	480i	DABL	Dabl
26.6	480i	WSFX 26	[Blank]
26.7	480i	Nosey	Nosey
