= WMBF-TV =

Television station in Myrtle Beach, South Carolina

- Myrtle Beach–Florence, South Carolina; United States
- City: Myrtle Beach, South Carolina
- Channels: Digital: 32 (UHF); Virtual: 32
- Branding: WMBF News

Programming
- Affiliations: 32.1: NBC; for others, see § Technical information and subchannels

Ownership
- Owner: Gray Media; (Gray Television Licensee, LLC)
- Sister stations: WXIV-LD

History
- Founded: October 18, 2005
- First air date: August 7, 2008
- Call sign meaning: Myrtle Beach–Florence

Technical information
- Licensing authority: FCC
- Facility ID: 83969
- ERP: 530 kW
- HAAT: 183 m (600 ft)
- Transmitter coordinates: 33°43′50.9″N 79°4′31.4″W
- Translator(s): see § Translators

Links
- Public license information: Public file; LMS
- Website: www.wmbfnews.com

WMBF-TV (channel 32) is a television station licensed to Myrtle Beach, South Carolina, United States, serving as the NBC affiliate for the Grand Strand and Pee Dee regions of South Carolina. It is owned by Gray Media alongside low-power Telemundo affiliate WXIV-LD (channel 14). The two stations share studios on Frontage Road East (along US 17) in Myrtle Beach, as well as a secondary studio and news bureau on West Cheves Street in Florence; WMBF-TV's transmitter is located on Flossie Road in Bucksville, South Carolina.

Among the youngest full-power major network affiliates in the United States, WMBF-TV began broadcasting in 2008 under Raycom Media, which had inherited the construction permit from Liberty Corporation. Its construction gave the region its first in-market NBC affiliate, replacing cable and over-the-air broadcasts of two co-owned stations in adjacent markets, and a third source of local news coverage. Due to technical restrictions, WMBF's over-the-air signal is not viewable in much of the market's inland portion, including Florence, the market's second-largest city; a network of five low-power translators extends WMBF's signal to much of this area for viewers without access to cable or satellite.

== History ==
In 1984, Moore Broadcast Industries petitioned the Federal Communications Commission (FCC) to add channel 32 to the table of allotments at Myrtle Beach, specifying the station had to be located 14 miles (23 km) southwest of town to protect two unused allotments in North Carolina, at High Point and Wilmington. Moore filed for the channel alongside seven other groups, but only three were still in the running in November 1986, when the FCC gave the nod to Coastal Carolina Broadcasting Company, a group of residents of Conway. Coastal Carolina's proposed station got a call sign, WCRD, but little else, being unable to secure financing.

The channel assignment lay fallow with no activity until 1996, when the FCC opened a last-chance window for filings to build new TV stations before turning the channels over to possible use for digital television facilities. An application was made by Cosmos Broadcasting, the broadcasting subsidiary of the Liberty Corporation and owner of WIS in Columbia. The president of Cosmos told The Sun News that the odds were "fairly long" for Cosmos to actually be granted the channel.

In October 2005, the FCC granted Liberty the permit. Two months earlier, though, Liberty had announced its sale to Raycom Media in a 15-station, $987 million transaction. Under the radar, the deal included the construction permit for channel 32 in Myrtle Beach. The Liberty purchase by Raycom united WIS with WECT in Wilmington. These stations had, for decades, provided NBC service to northeastern South Carolina. WIS and WECT were on the Myrtle Beach cable system when it debuted in 1962; said cable system was co-owned with WIS. Beginning in 1995, WIS and Time Warner Cable had been engaged in a joint venture to produce a customized feed of the station for the market's inland portion, "WIS–Florence", complete with its own advertising sales staff.

Facilities were approved in early 2007, and it was announced at that time that the station would replace WIS and WECT on regional cable systems. Raycom selected a building formerly used by cell phone company SunCom on Frontage Road and began construction later that year. For Raycom, the construction of WMBF served several goals. Because the digital television transition was looming—with the Wilmington stations, including WECT, part of a pilot switchover in September 2008—the Myrtle Beach station, built as a digital-only facility from the outset, would fill in gaps in coverage after WECT's analog signal shut down. It also would allow Raycom to sell advertising in the rapidly growing Grand Strand area for the first time and give NBC its first in-market affiliate for Florence and Myrtle Beach.

The transmitter was turned on in late July 2008, and the station began programming at 11:59 p.m. on August 7, with NBC welcoming the station on-air the following day on Today, NBC Nightly News, and Late Night with Conan O'Brien. The sign-on of WMBF-TV occurred in time for the opening ceremony of the 2008 Summer Olympics. The construction of WMBF cost Raycom an estimated $10 million.

=== Sale to Gray Television ===
In June 2018, Atlanta-based Gray Television announced it had reached an agreement to merge with Raycom in a transaction valued at $3.6 billion. The sale was approved on December 20 and completed on January 2, 2019.

== Newscasts ==
As a new build, WMBF-TV went on the air with high-definition local newscasts from the outset, including live shots from the field. A number of its early personalities had roots in the area; general manager Ted Fortenberry said that it was important to "find people who know the lay of the land". In the station's early years, managers elsewhere in the Raycom group were often instructed to seek advice from WMBF on technical issues related to HD news conversion. WMBF was the first local station to launch weekend morning newscasts, doing so in the early 2010s.

== Technical information and subchannels ==
The station's signal is multiplexed:

Subchannels of WMBF-TV
Subchannel	Res.	Short name	Programming
32.1	1080i	WMBFDT	NBC
32.2	480i	WMBFBNC	Bounce TV
32.3	480i	WMBFPSE	Palmetto Sports & Entertainment
32.4	480i	WMBFLAF	Laff
32.5	480i	WMBFGRT	Grit
32.6	480i	WMBFQST	Quest
32.7	480i	WMBFION	Ion Plus

=== Translators ===
The signal from WMBF's main transmitter, located on Flossie Road in Bucksville, South Carolina, does not reach much of the market's inland portion, including its second-largest city, Florence. To make up for the shortfall in coverage, WMBF is relayed on four translators licensed to Florence—W06DK-D, W19FC-D, W24EX-D, and W35ED-D; all remap to virtual channel 32. These translators, particularly W35ED-D, serve the few viewers in the market's inland portion without access to cable or satellite.

On January 3, 2022, Jeffrey Winemiller's Lowcountry 34 Media reached a deal to sell W19FC-D, W35ED-D, and 21 other low-power TV stations to Gray Television for $3.75 million.

Translators of WMBF-TV
Call sign	City of license	Channel	Facility ID	ERP	HAAT	Transmitter coordinates
W06DK-D	Florence, SC	6	185609	3 kW	110 m (361 ft)	34°16′18.0″N 79°43′33.0″W
W19FC-D	Florence, SC	19	185607	15 kW	92 m (302 ft)	34°22′5.0″N 79°19′20.0″W
W24EX-D	Florence, SC	24	182022	15 kW	102 m (335 ft)	34°16′18.0″N 79°43′33.0″W
W25FQ-D	Florence, SC	25	182020	15 kW	22.3 m (73 ft)	34°10′51.0″N 79°23′51.0″W
W35ED-D	Florence, SC	35	185608	15 kW	231 m (758 ft)	34°16′48.1″N 79°44′34.4″W

Grade A signal contours for WMBF-TV and all associated translators. All broadcast on virtual channel 32.; WMBF-TV main signal; Low-power translators
