= Bucksport, South Carolina =

- Census-designated place
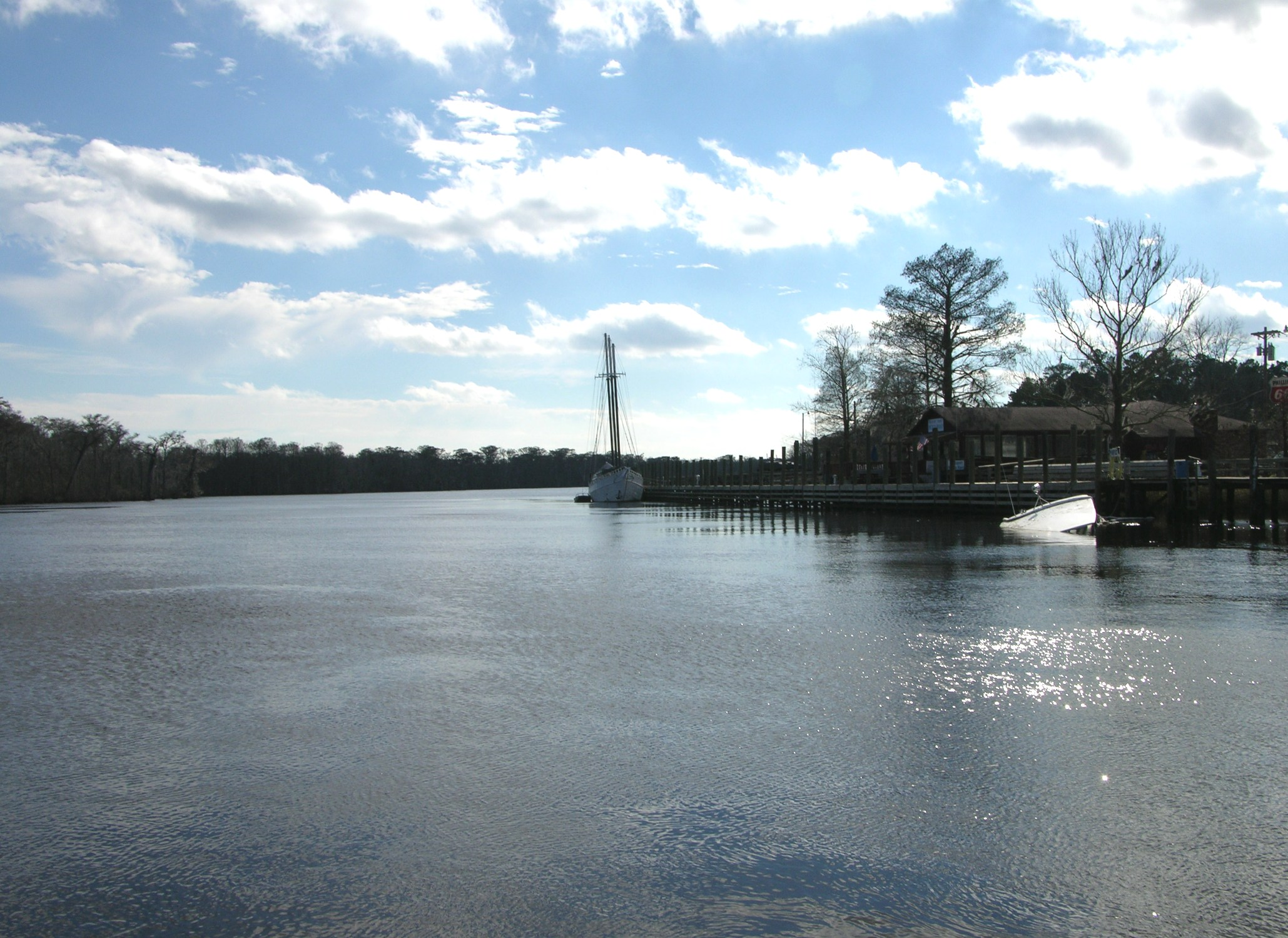
- Along the Intracoastal Waterway at Bucksport

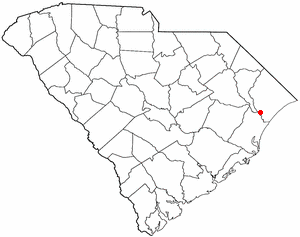
- Location in South Carolina
- Coordinates: 33°40′10″N 79°07′18″W
- Country: United States
- State: South Carolina
- County: Horry

Area
  - Total: 4.22 sq mi (10.94 km^{2})
  - Land: 4.20 sq mi (10.89 km^{2})
  - Water: 0.019 sq mi (0.05 km^{2})
- Elevation: 20 ft (6.1 m)

Population (2020)
  - Total: 745
  - Density: 177.2/sq mi (68.42/km^{2})
- Time zone: UTC-5 (EST)
  - Summer (DST): UTC-4 (EDT)
- ZIP code: 29527
- Area codes: 843, 854
- FIPS code: 45-10000
- GNIS feature ID: 2402728

Bucksport is an unincorporated community and census-designated place (CDP) in Horry County, South Carolina, United States. The population was 876 at the 2010 census. It is a rural port on the Atlantic Intracoastal Waterway at the merger point with the Waccamaw River.

== History ==
Henry Buck of Bucksport, Maine, moved to South Carolina in the 1820s to start lumber mills; Horry County had a significant timber industry with its cypress, pine and hardwood forests. One of Buck's mills was in what became Bucksport. Sawmills in Bucksport and Bucksville produced three million board feet of lumber annually by 1850. Buck used his ships to transport lumber to Georgetown and Charleston in South Carolina and as far away as New York City and Boston, and even to other countries. Lumber from Buck's operation even went into the construction of the Brooklyn Bridge. The Independent Republic Quarterly said, "By 1860, due largely to Bucksville and Bucksport, Horry District had become one of the five greatest timber-producing districts in the state."

== Geography ==
Bucksport is in southwestern Horry County. The CDP extends from the Waccamaw River in the southeast to U.S. Route 701 in the north, with Bucksport Road forming the main road through the community. US 701 leads northeast 11 miles (18 km) to Conway, the Horry county seat, and southwest 25 miles (40 km) to Georgetown. Myrtle Beach, 12 miles (19 km) to the east as the crow flies, is 25 miles (40 km) away by highway across the Waccamaw River and Intracoastal Waterway.

According to the United States Census Bureau, the Bucksport CDP has a total area of 4.2 square miles (10.9 km^{2}), of which 0.02 square miles (0.05 km^{2}), or 0.48%, are water.

== Demographics ==
Historical population
Census	Pop.	Note	%±
2000	1,117		—
2010	876		−21.6%
2020	745		−15.0%
U.S. Decennial Census

=== 2020 census ===
Bucksport racial composition
Race	Num.	Perc.			
Black or African American (non-Hispanic)	660	88.59%	White (non-Hispanic)	51	6.85%
Other/Mixed	27	3.62%			
Hispanic or Latino	7	0.94%			

As of the 2020 United States census, there were 745 people, 280 households, and 163 families residing in the CDP.

=== 2000 census ===
As of the census of 2000, there were 1,117 people, 359 households, and 285 families residing in the CDP. The population density was 290.8 inhabitants per square mile (112.3/km^{2}). There were 388 housing units at an average density of 101.0 per square mile (39.0/km^{2}). The racial makeup of the CDP was 2.24% White, 96.60% African American, 0.45% Native American, 0.18% from other races, and 0.54% from two or more races. Hispanic or Latino of any race were 0.09% of the population.

There were 359 households, out of which 36.8% had children under the age of 18 living with them, 38.4% were married couples living together, 34.8% had a female householder with no husband present, and 20.6% were non-families. 18.7% of all households were made up of individuals, and 7.8% had someone living alone who was 65 years of age or older. The average household size was 3.11 and the average family size was 3.53.

In the CDP, the population was spread out, with 32.9% under the age of 18, 9.5% from 18 to 24, 28.9% from 25 to 44, 18.3% from 45 to 64, and 10.5% who were 65 years of age or older. The median age was 32 years. For every 100 females, there were 86.2 males. For every 100 females age 18 and over, there were 77.3 males.

The median income for a household in the CDP was $24,038, and the median income for a family was $23,750. Males had a median income of $31,618 versus $19,186 for females. The per capita income for the CDP was $10,832. About 14.9% of families and 20.9% of the population were below the poverty line, including 28.6% of those under age 18 and 35.6% of those age 65 or over.

== Education ==
Horry County School District is the sole school district in the county.

Bucksport has a public library, a branch of the Horry County Memorial Library.
