= WTMH =

WTMH may refer to:

- WTMH-LD, a low-power television station (channel 21) licensed to serve Macon, Georgia, United States; see List of television stations in Georgia (U.S. state)
- WARZ-LD, a low-power television station (channel 26, virtual 21) licensed to Smithfield, North Carolina, United States, which held the call sign WTMH-LD from 2013 to 2021
