= Statesboro Herald =

- Type: Daily newspaper
- Format: Broadsheet
- Owner: Morris Multimedia
- Editor: Jim Healy
- Founded: 1937
- Headquarters: Statesboro, Georgia
- Circulation: 6,926 (as of 2013)
- Website: statesboroherald.com

The Statesboro Herald is a newspaper published one day a week located in Statesboro, Georgia, United States. Owned by Morris Multimedia, it has a circulation of about 5,300, and primarily serves Bulloch, Screven, Evans, and Candler counties.

The newspaper's website, statesboroherald.com, was named "Best Newspaper Website" by the National Newspaper Association in 2009.
