= WXXV-TV =

Television station in Gulfport, Mississippi

- Gulfport–Biloxi–; Pascagoula, Mississippi; United States
- City: Gulfport, Mississippi
- Channels: Digital: 25 (UHF); Virtual: 25
- Branding: WXXV Fox 25; WXXV NBC 25 (25.2); News 25; Gulf Coast CW (25.3)

Programming
- Affiliations: 25.1: Fox/MyNetworkTV; 25.2: NBC; 25.3: CW+; for others, see § Subchannels

Ownership
- Owner: Morris Multimedia; (Morris Network of Mississippi, Inc.)

History
- First air date: February 14, 1987
- Former channel numbers: Analog: 25 (UHF, 1987–2009); Digital: 48 (UHF, until 2019)
- Former affiliations: Independent (February–April 1987); ABC (NYPD Blue, 1994–2005)
- Call sign meaning: "XXV" is 25 Roman numerals

Technical information
- Licensing authority: FCC
- Facility ID: 53517
- ERP: 190 kW
- HAAT: 483 m (1,585 ft)
- Transmitter coordinates: 30°44′48″N 89°3′30″W

Links
- Public license information: Public file; LMS
- Website: wxxv25.com

WXXV-TV (channel 25) is a television station licensed to Gulfport, Mississippi, United States, serving the Mississippi Gulf Coast as an affiliate of Fox, MyNetworkTV, NBC and The CW Plus. The station is owned by Morris Multimedia, and maintains studios on US 49 in Lyman (with a Gulfport mailing address); its transmitter is located on Wire Road East in unincorporated Stone County, northeast of McHenry.

Channel 25 began broadcasting in February 1987 as the second local station on the Mississippi Gulf Coast. It affiliated with Fox two months after signing on the air. After an early history that was financially turbulent, including a bankruptcy filing in order to stave off a public auction, the station stabilized under owners Prime Cities Broadcasting in the 1990s. Morris acquired WXXV in 1997 and debuted its first local newscast, which ran from 1999 to 2001 before being shelved for economic reasons. In the digital era, WXXV has used digital subchannels to add NBC and The CW to its lineup. As part of the addition of NBC, in 2013, the station returned to producing local newscasts and has expanded to provide full-day coverage on the Fox and NBC channels.

== History ==
=== Construction and early years ===
In July 1982, the Federal Communications Commission (FCC) received three applications for channel 25 on the Mississippi Gulf Coast, all seeking to build the area's second local station (after ABC affiliate WLOX). The firms were Payvision Communications of Knoxville, Tennessee; Hightower Communications, owner of WPMI-TV in Mobile, Alabama; and Four-O Inc. of Brandon, Mississippi. Four-O won the permit and selected the call sign WXXV, but it had yet to choose by September 1983 whether channel 25 would be a network affiliate or an independent station. It elected to run the station as an independent outlet, and construction was under way on the station's studios in Lyman by March 1986. Work on the tower at McHenry was considerably delayed, and station officials repeatedly pushed back WXXV's projected sign-on.

WXXV-TV made its first broadcast on February 8, 1987; owing to technical difficulties on start-up, it then left the air and began full-time broadcasting on February 14. Its programs included brief local news updates, live sports, and other syndicated shows, which were broadcast as far north as Hattiesburg. In April, channel 25 joined the Fox network, picking up its weekend prime time and late-night programming.

=== Financial difficulties and Prime Cities ownership ===
Within months of signing on, the station encountered financial difficulties. In the construction process, Four-O had become the managing general partner in the station's licensee, Gulf Coast Television. The station sought new limited partners, only to put the round on hold; it owed money to several large creditors, most notably AmSouth Bank of Birmingham, Alabama. During this time, in January 1988, WXXV debuted a call-in public affairs program, 25 Live.

AmSouth moved to put WXXV-TV up for public auction in September 1988, with the station having fallen several months behind on its loan repayments. Days before the auction was to take place, Gulf Coast Television preempted the action by filing for Chapter 11 bankruptcy protection. A year later, the bankruptcy case was resolved in a settlement that transferred the station to AmSouth. The new management grappled with WXXV's prior reputation as a station that did not pay its bills; to earn the trust of syndicators and other vendors, the station paid them early.

The bank, through its realty division, put channel 25 on the market a year later; it was acquired by Prime Cities Broadcasting, a partnership of Dick Shively and Jim Tupper. Shively had been serving as consultant to WXXV since AmSouth took control. Under Prime Cities ownership, WXXV-TV began airing the ABC drama series NYPD Blue; WLOX, along with all other ABC affiliates in Mississippi, refused to air it when it debuted in 1993, and channel 25 picked it up beginning with the second season.

=== Morris ownership and digital expansion ===
By 1996, Prime Cities was shopping WXXV to potential buyers, including the owners of WWTV and WWUP in northern Michigan. Prime Cities announced the sale of WXXV to Morris Network for $17.5 million in February 1997, with the new owners taking over in June. In the 2000s, WXXV switched from analog to digital broadcasting, launching its digital signal before going digital-only on February 17, 2009.

Morris announced in March 2012 that it would add NBC to a subchannel of WXXV, displacing MyNetworkTV, that July; in addition, it would expand the studios in Lyman and start a news operation to support the Fox and NBC channels. The move coincided with WLOX, its competitor with an 80 percent share of market revenue, adding a CBS subchannel, giving the four major networks in-market affiliates on the Mississippi Gulf Coast. On January 1, 2015, WXXV added a subchannel for The CW, replacing MyNetworkTV, which began running during late nights on WXXV–Fox.

== News operation ==
Channel 25 picked up its first long-form local news program when the station began airing Mississippi News Tonight, a 9 p.m. newscast produced in Jackson, in January 1992. Mississippi News Tonight was produced by Love Communications, a venture from the same family as the then-owners of WLOX, Love Broadcasting. The program only aired for three months on WXXV before being canceled altogether on April 4.

While station management considered producing full-length local news to debut sometime in 1993 or early 1994 following the discontinuation of MNT, general manager Bill Ritchie opted against expanding beyond news breaks because of the management hassle and expense the endeavor would incur. Morris demonstrated more interest in producing a newscast and launched Fox 25 News at Nine in March 1999. The news department was not an economic success and was discontinued on January 6, 2001, for financial reasons.

After obtaining the NBC affiliation, Morris announced its plans to expand the Lyman studios to support a news operation. On September 30, 2013, the newscasts launched on the Fox and NBC subchannels; the station hired 15 personnel to staff the startup operation. The original newscast lineup included 9 p.m. news on WXXV–Fox and 5:30 and 10 p.m. newscasts on WXXV–NBC, both only airing on weeknights. In 2015, the news lineup was expanded with a morning newscast, initially airing for two hours total across the NBC and Fox channels, and Sunday night newscasts. Since then, the station has added noon (on NBC, in 2016) and 5 p.m. (on Fox, in 2017) newscasts; it also extended its morning news to four hours and its 9 p.m. news to a full hour. The 5:30 p.m. newscast moved to 6 p.m. in 2023.

== Subchannels ==
WXXV-TV's transmitter is located on Wire Road East in unincorporated Stone County, northeast of McHenry. The station's signal is multiplexed:

Subchannels of WXXV-TV
Subchannel	Res.	Short name	Programming
25.1	720p	WXXVFOX	Fox/MyNetworkTV
25.2	720p	WXXVNBC	NBC
25.3	720p	WXXVCW+	The CW Plus
25.4	480i	WXXVION	Ion Plus
25.5	480i	WXXVGRT	Grit
