= Murchison Building =

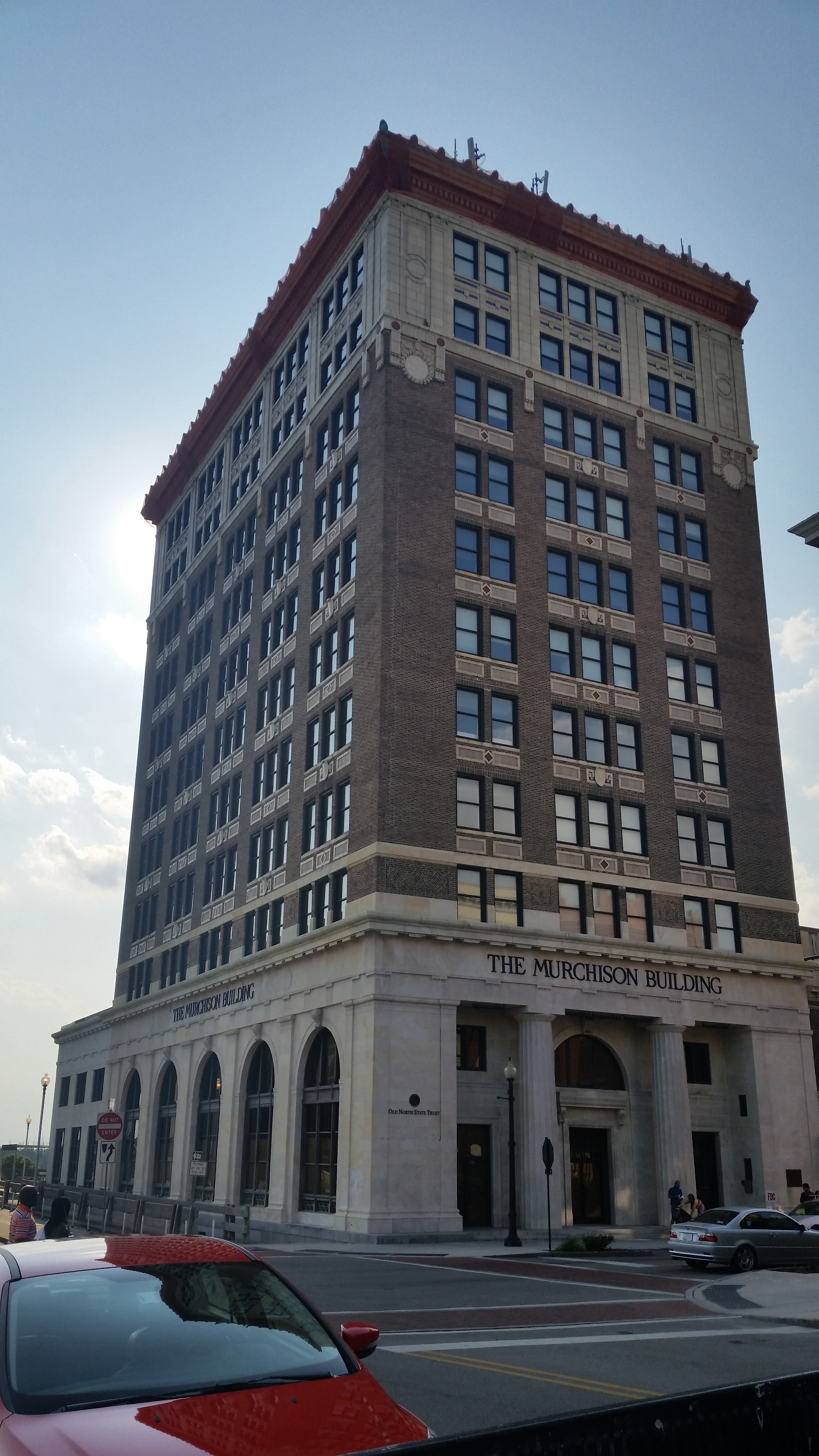

General information
- Type: Mixed use
- Location: 201 N. Front Street; Wilmington, North Carolina
- Coordinates: 34.237681°N 77.949068°W
- Completed: 1914

Height
- Roof: 137.76 ft (41.99 m)

Technical details
- Floor count: 11
- Floor area: 62,230 sq ft (5,781 m^{2})
- Lifts/elevators: 2, made by Otis Elevator Company, one manually operated

Design and construction
- Architect: Kenneth M. Murchison
- Developer: Murchison National Bank
- Main contractor: J. Henry Miller, Inc

The Murchison Building (pronounced Murk-i-son) is an eleven-story brick and marble building in Wilmington, North Carolina, USA. It occupies the corner of Front and Chestnut Street. Sitting on historic waterfront property, the building overlooks the Cotton Exchange and Cape Fear Community College to the north, USS North Carolina Battleship Memorial and Cape Fear to the west, Riverfront Park and Chandlers Wharf to the south and Wilmington Downtown including its Courthouse to the east.

== History ==
The Murchison Building, at the corner of Front and Chestnut Streets, has been a staple of the waterfront skyline for nearly a century. "The Murch" was built for and by the Murchison National Bank, and until 1972 was called the Murchison National Bank Building. Another building, the original four-story Murchison National Bank built in 1902, is directly across the street.

In its infancy, the Murchison was considered top-of-the-line. It was heated by two boilers, sending steam heat to radiators throughout the building. It had an onsite artesian well, supplying its own water. Female employees and patrons had a women's restroom on the fourth floor. The second and third floors were provided with gas and electric appliances so that those occupants (mostly doctors and dentists) would have the most modern surgical equipment available.

A claim to fame of the 1914 Murchison Building was that it had human elevator operators. One operator "survived" the 1983 renovations intact, and remains as the lift's operator. She is the building's longest tenant, with 16 years tenure. Another quaint feature was a woman's bathroom on the fourth floor, touted as a selling point for the building.

In 1921 a hospital was built next door.

== Construction ==
The building

Construction began on the site in August 1913. The previous structure was owned by the 'Cape Fear Club for Men' according to a bronze plaque fixed to the building's front.

It was built in 1914 as The Murchison National Bank, WILMINGTON, N. C. The waterproofing was by Impervious Products Co. The terra cotta was by South Amboy Terra Cotta Co. The cement floors and walks were by Harrison & Meyer. The Kentucky Blue Stone was supplied by the Rowan County Freestone Co.

It was designed by Wilmington native Kenneth M. Murchison of New York.

== Architecture ==
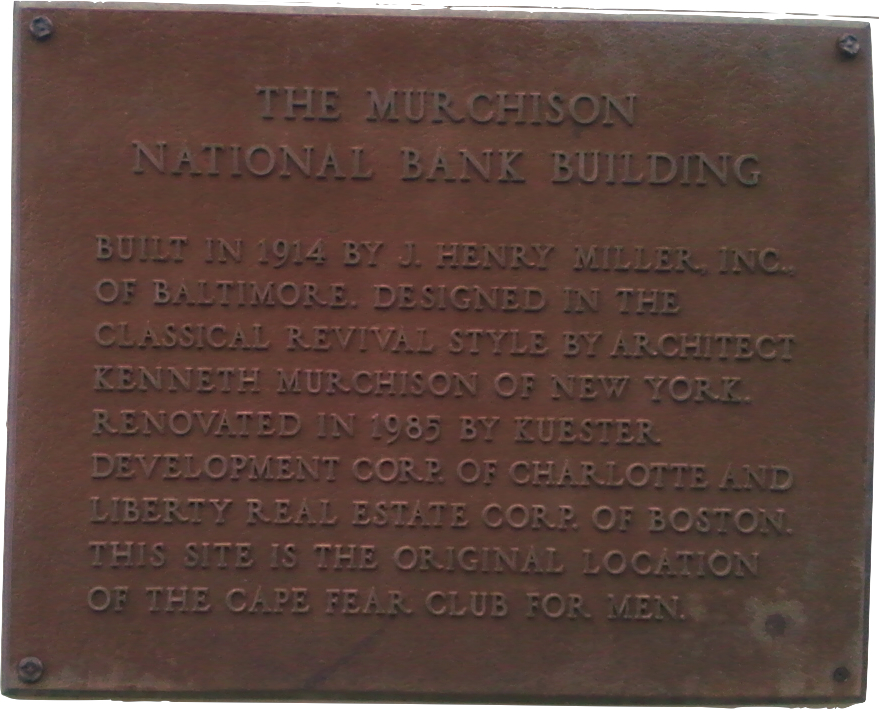
A plaque on the building

The Murchison still juts into the sky above the downtown skyline nearly a century since its inception. It is second only to the PPD building in heights of buildings in Wilmington. A plaque on the front of the building denotes that the building's architecture is of the Classical Revival style. A number of US skyscrapers built in the 1910s and 1920s have startlingly similar looks to the Murchison.

=== Features of neoclassical revival architecture ===
Neoclassical (or neoclassical revival) buildings have traits such as classical symmetry, full-height porch with columns and temple-like fronts. Ornamentation that iconifies this style are classics, such as dentil cornices.

== Historic waterfront neighborhood ==
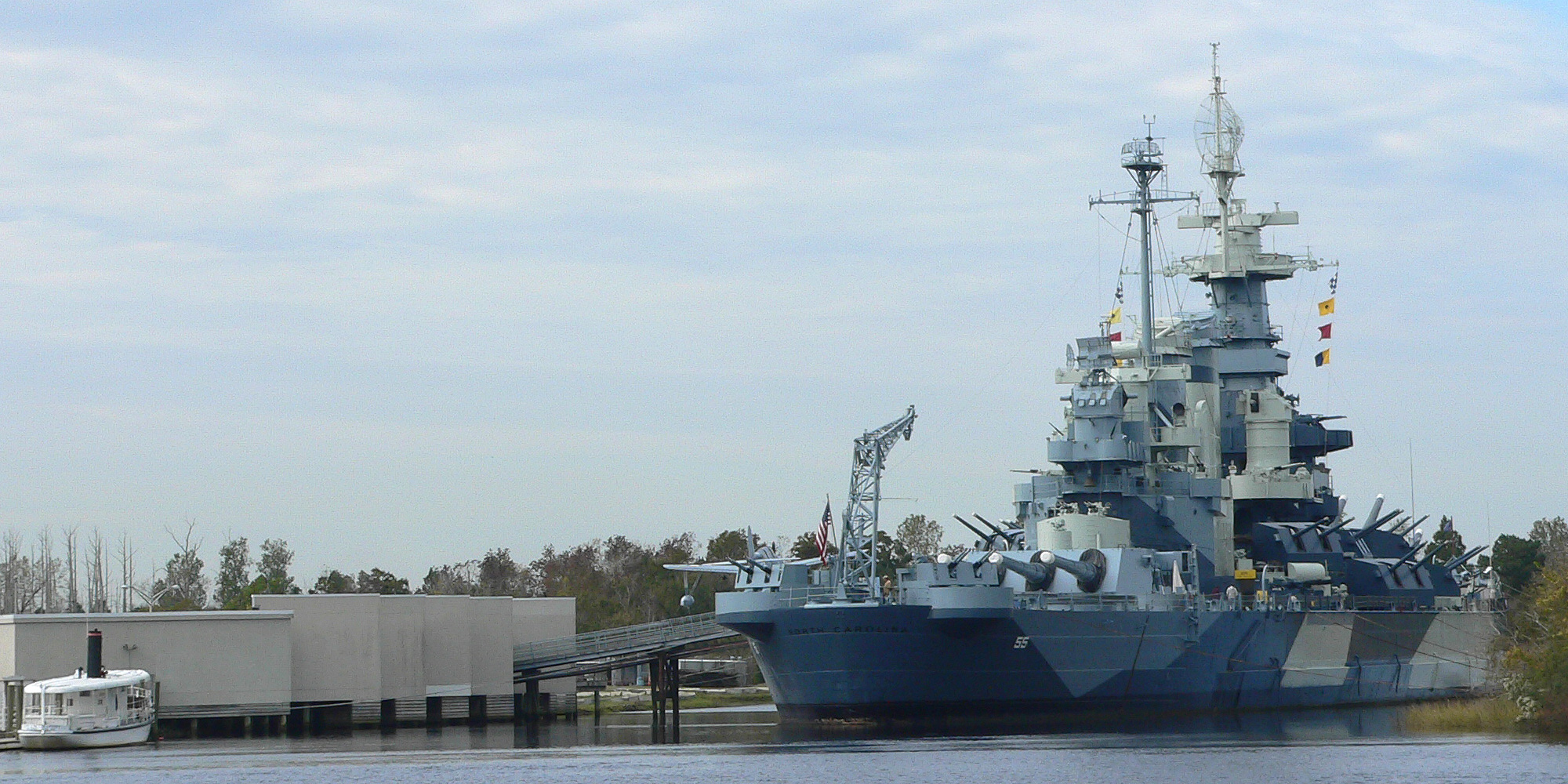
The USS North Carolina Battleship Memorial, seen from downtown Wilmington, looking across the mouth of the Cape Fear.

The Murchison is near the northern terminus of Wilmington's Riverwalk, a historic waterfront pedestrian stroll among buildings and businesses that front the Cape Fear River. This inland port thrived from the cotton trade during the late 19th century and early 20th century and is now home to restaurants, theaters, nightclubs and weekly free concerts during the summer months.

== Riverfront district ==
Wilmington's downtown riverfront district contains restaurants, cafes, historic buildings, art galleries, antique shops, pubs, nightclubs, music clubs. It has several pedestrian-friendly environments. Wilmington's Nationally Preserved Historic District is anchored by nautical, civic, wartime, and other landmarks.

== World War II battleship ==
The Murchison Building (location: 34.237681°N 77.949068°W) enjoys a commanding view of Battleship Park and the floating museum USS North Carolina (ship memorial location: 34.236344°N 77.953405°W) located across the Cape Fear River. The ship is viewable in aerial photography of the area, e.g. Google Earth and can serve as a landmark when pinpointing the building from them.

The USS-North Carolina was towed and placed in her permanent berth on October 2, 1961 and is a National Historic Landmark.

== Occupancy ==
Early business occupancy would have characterized the Murchison Building as prestigious: banks, dentists, doctors, and the city's newspaper have called this building home. Business occupants now include The Upper Room Barbershop (http://theupperoombarbershop.com) on the 5th floor, Atlantic Shopper, the headquarters for state and national-level politicians, a legal-aid agency, a radio station, web and logo design services, engineers and architects. Brian Ballard, owner of Pour Taproom, will be leasing the space and be opening the self serve taproom in early April

=== Significant commercial occupants (past) ===
- Wilmington Star-News ground floor 1935-1970
- First Union National Bank
- Wilmington Chamber of Commerce 1914-1924
- The Edge 88.5 FM Radio Station

=== Significant commercial occupants (present) ===
- Atlantic Shopper
- e-Interchange, Internet Marketing
- BlueTone Media: 2005–Present
- US Senator Richard Burr (R)
- Northern Trust
- Legal Aid of NC
- Viewpoint Screening
- Mark Loudermilk Architecture
