= Bucksville, South Carolina =

Coordinates: 33°43′08″N 79°03′46″W

- Unincorporated community
- Interactive map of Bucksville, South Carolina
- Country: United States
- State: South Carolina
- County: Horry
- Elevation: 20 ft (6.1 m)
- Time zone: UTC-5 (Eastern (EST))
  - Summer (DST): UTC-4 (EDT)
- ZIP Code: 29527
- Area code: 843
- GNIS feature ID: 1247045

Bucksville is a small unincorporated community in Horry County, South Carolina, United States. It lies near Bucksport on the Pee Dee River and Waccamaw River. Two properties are listed on the National Register of Historic Places: the Buck's Upper Mill Farm and Hebron Church.

== History ==
Henry Buck of Bucksport, Maine moved to South Carolina in the 1820s to start lumber mills; Horry County had a significant timber industry with its cypress, pine and hardwood forests. One of Buck's mills was in what became Bucksport. Sawmills in Bucksport and Bucksville produced 3 million board feet of lumber annually by 1850. Buck used his ships to transport lumber to Georgetown and Charleston in South Carolina and as far away as New York City and Boston, and even to other countries. Lumber from Buck's operation even went into the construction of the Brooklyn Bridge. The Independent Republic Quarterly said, "By 1860, due largely to Bucksville and Bucksport, Horry District had become one of the five greatest timber-producing districts in the state." Buck also was one of the largest slave owners in Horry County, with a plantation of 20,000 acres in the Bucksville community. The house, built in 1828, was restored in 1984 by Buck family members who continue to live there in 2011. The slave cemetery is still in use.
