= Buck's Upper Mill Farm =

Historic house in South Carolina, United States

- U.S. National Register of Historic Places
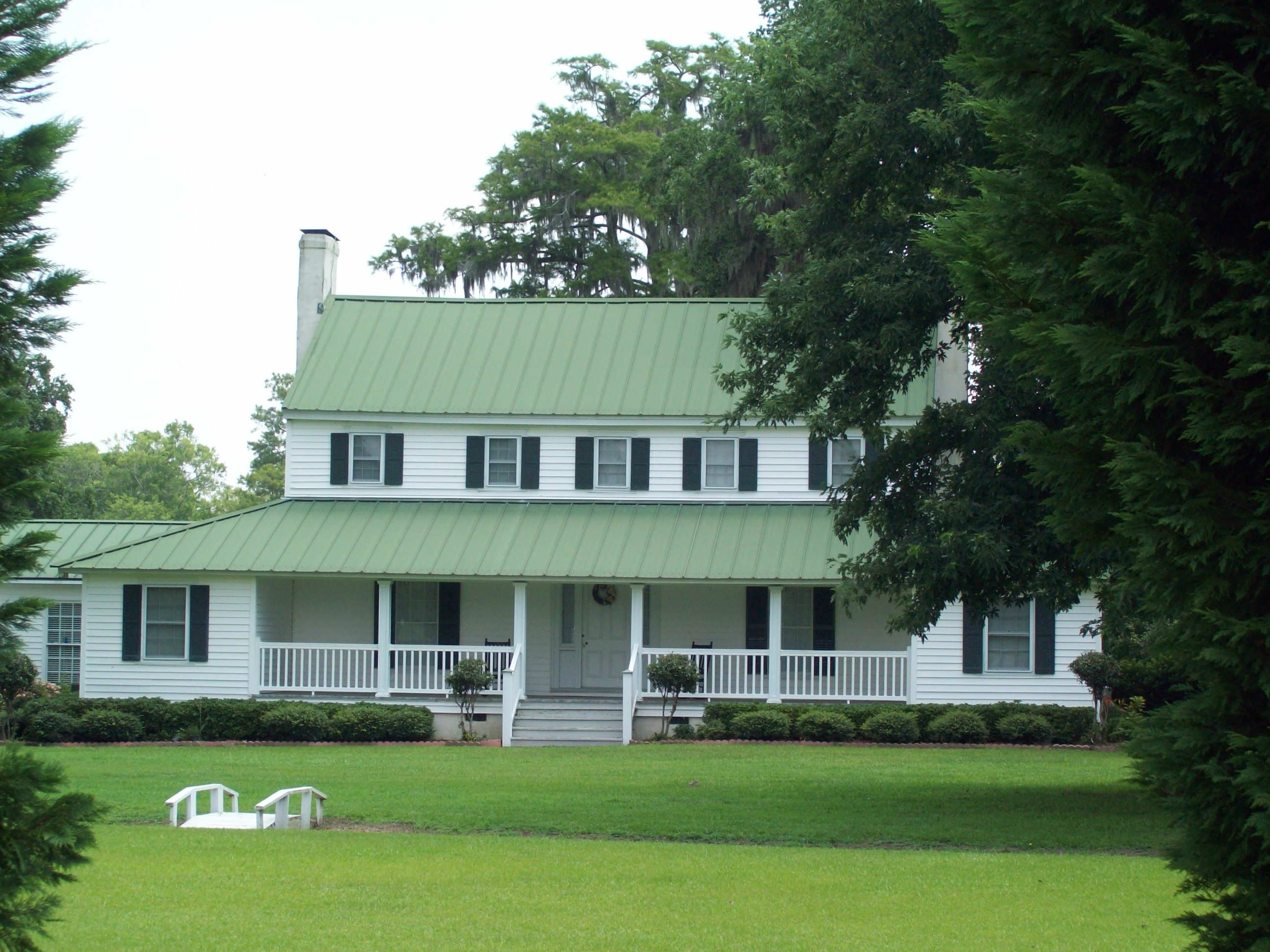
- Buck's Upper Mill Farm, June 2010

- Location within South Carolina Location within the United States
- Nearest city: Bucksville, South Carolina
- Coordinates: 33°44′19″N 79°3′48″W
- Area: 8.3 acres (3.4 ha)
- Built: 1838
- Architectural style: Central-hall farmhouse
- NRHP reference No.: 82003868
- Added to NRHP: March 25, 1982

Buck's Upper Mill Farm, also known as Henry Buck House, is a historic home located at Bucksville in Horry County, South Carolina. The house was built about 1838 and is a typical two-story, central hall, framed farmhouse, or "I"-House. The front façade features a full-length, one-story porch with a shed roof supported by six square posts. Also on the property are a one-story frame building constructed in the 19th century as a commissary for Buck's lumber business, and the ruins of a sawmill (such as a round brick smokestack on a square base).

It was listed on the National Register of Historic Places in 1982.
