= The Boscobel Dial =

Weekly newspaper in Boscobel, Wisconsin, U.S.

- Type: Weekly Newspaper
- Format: Broadsheet
- Owner(s): Morris Multimedia
- Publisher: John Ingebritsen
- Editor: Joe Hart
- Founded: 1872
- Headquarters: Lancaster, Wisconsin
- Circulation: 2,967 (as of 2022)
- OCLC number: 11619186
- Website: swnews4u.com

The Boscobel Dial is a weekly newspaper based in Boscobel, Wisconsin and printed in Lancaster, Wisconsin. It publishes Thursday and is owned by Morris Multimedia.

== History ==
The newspaper was first published in 1872.

In 1956, the Dial was bought by reporter and editor Ralph Goldsmith, who ran it with his wife until selling it in 1992. On its sale, Goldsmith cited his son's reluctance to follow him into the business. Goldsmith was entered into the Wisconsin Newspaper Hall of Fame in 2002.

The paper was sold by William Hale to Morris Multimedia in 2002 as one paper in a seven paper deal.
