= Hebron Church (Bucksville, South Carolina) =

Historic church in South Carolina, United States

- U.S. National Register of Historic Places
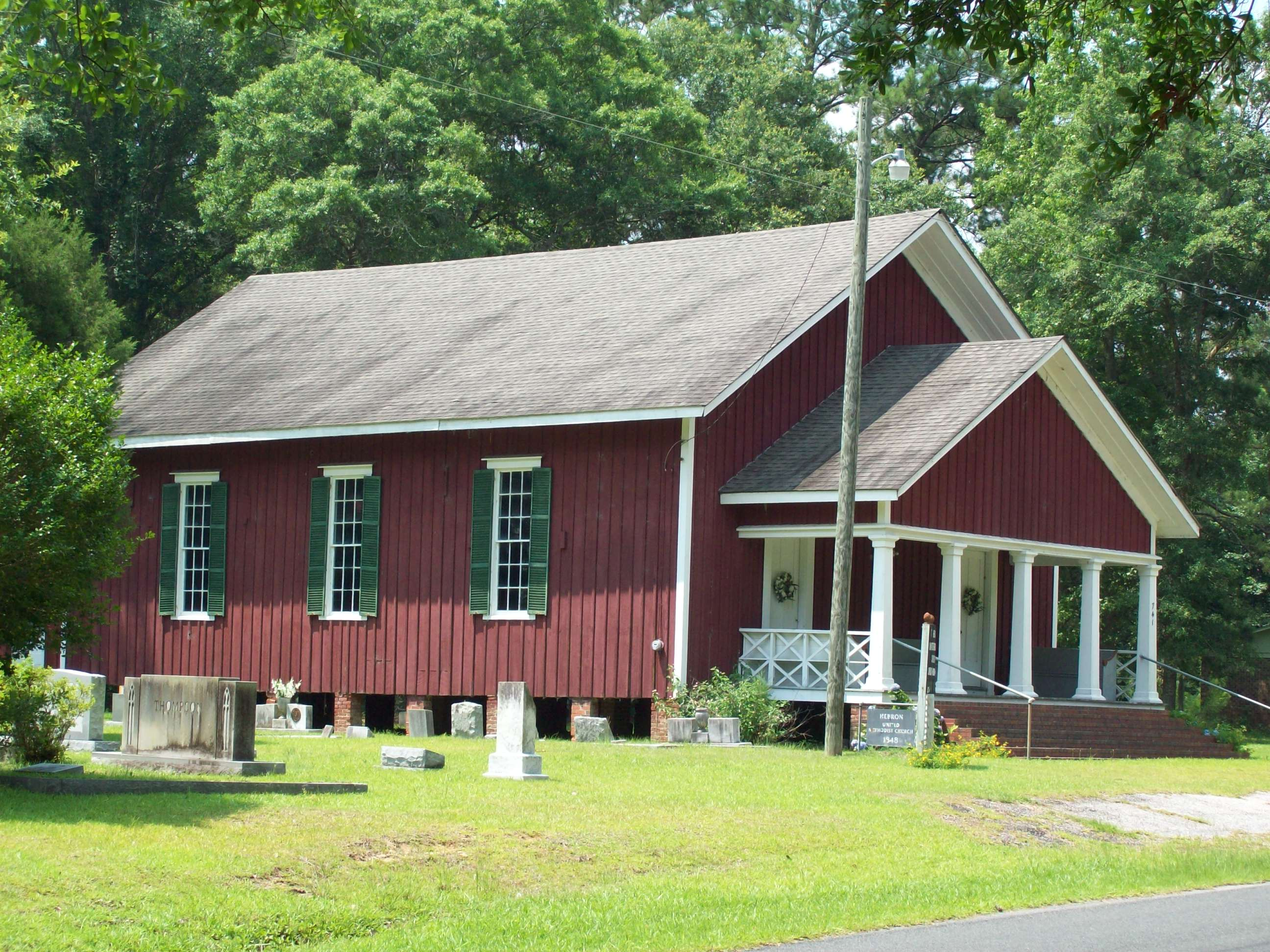
- Hebron Church, June 2010

- Location within South Carolina Location within the United States
- Nearest city: Bucksville, South Carolina
- Coordinates: 33°42′57″N 79°4′3″W
- Area: 5 acres (2.0 ha)
- Built: 1855
- NRHP reference No.: 77001227
- Added to NRHP: May 16, 1977

Hebron Church, also known as Hebron Methodist Church, is a historic Methodist church located at Bucksville in Horry County, South Carolina. The sanctuary was built about 1855 and is a rectangular "meeting house form" one-story frame church with batten siding and a gable roof covered with tin. It features a slightly lower, pedimented, projecting portico supported by five square, wooden columns. Also on the property are two graveyards: the church graveyard and the Henry Buck family graveyard located across the road.

It was listed on the National Register of Historic Places in 1977.

== Gallery ==
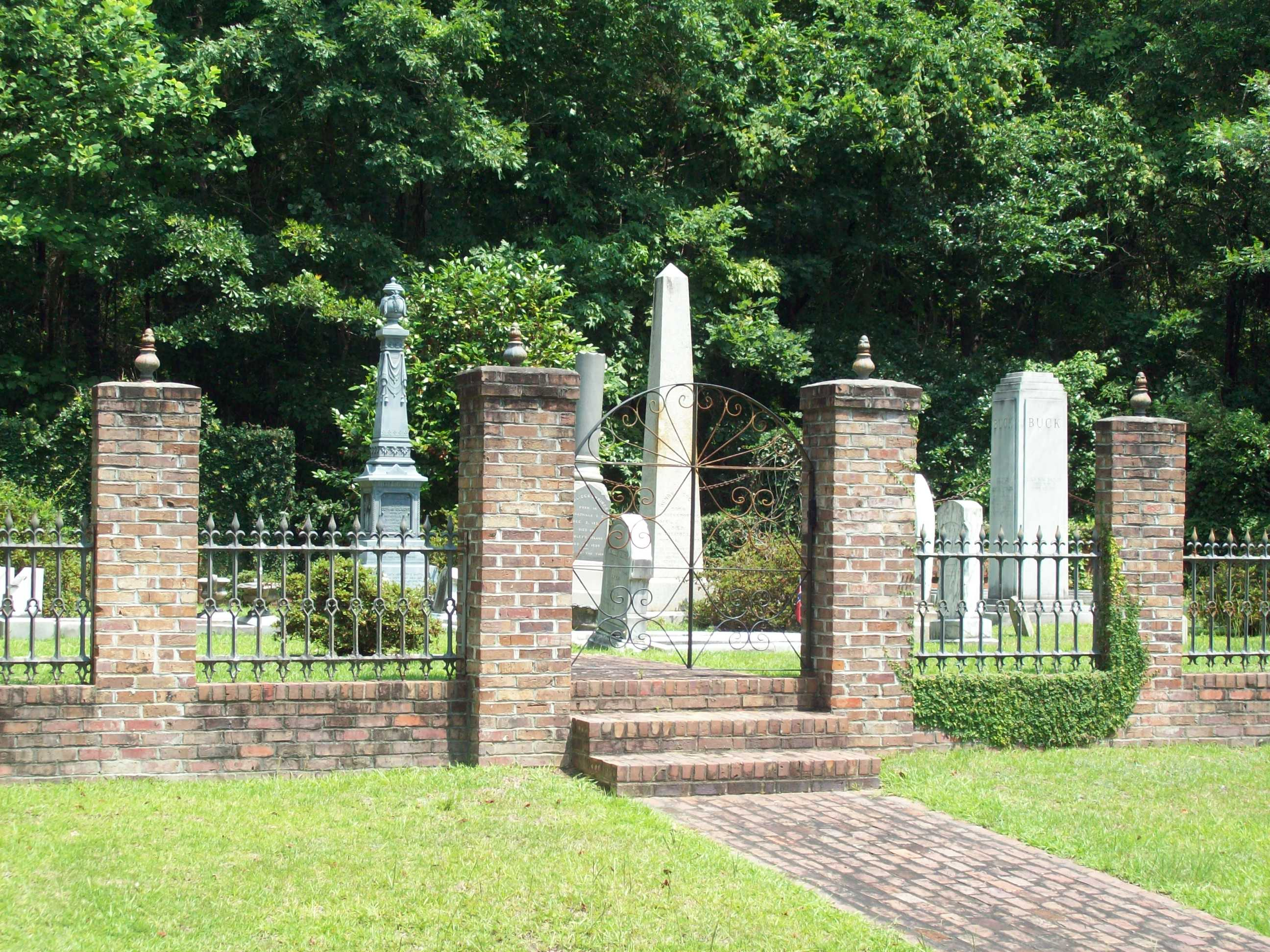
Henry Buck Family Graveyard
