= WILM-LD =

Television station in Wilmington, North Carolina

- Wilmington, North Carolina; United States
- Channels: Digital: 15 (UHF); Virtual: 10
- Branding: WILM-TV 10 (general); WRAL News (newscasts)

Programming
- Affiliations: 10.1: Independent/MeTV (secondary); 10.2: full MeTV schedule; 10.3: Heroes & Icons

Ownership
- Owner: Capitol Broadcasting Company; (WILM, Inc.)
- Sister stations: WRAL-TV, WRAZ

History
- First air date: August 29, 1990
- Former call signs: W10BZ (1989–1995); WSSN-LP (1995–2000); WILM-LP (2000–2008)
- Former channel numbers: Analog: 10 (VHF, 1989–2008); Digital: 40 (UHF, 2008–2018)
- Former affiliations: Independent (1989–1997); UPN (primary 1997–2000, secondary 2000–2006); CBS (2000–2016)
- Call sign meaning: Wilmington

Technical information
- Licensing authority: FCC
- Facility ID: 167819
- Class: LD
- ERP: 15 kW
- HAAT: 250.3 m (821 ft)
- Transmitter coordinates: 34°19′16.6″N 78°13′42″W
- Translator(s): W33FF-D 24 Wilmington; W30ER-D Wilmington

Links
- Public license information: LMS
- Website: www.wilm-tv.com

WILM-LD (channel 10) is a low-power Independent/MeTV affiliate station in Wilmington, North Carolina, United States, owned by the Capitol Broadcasting Company. The station's studios are located on Wrightsville Avenue (US 76) in Wilmington, and its transmitter is located in Delco, North Carolina. Master control and some internal operations are based at the facilities of sister station, NBC affiliate and company flagship WRAL-TV in Raleigh.

On December 31, 2016, WILM lost its CBS affiliation to a digital subchannel of ABC affiliate WWAY (channel 3) and became an independent station.

== History ==
The current station is actually the second TV outlet to have the WILM calls. WILM-TV (proposed for Wilmington, Delaware) was granted a construction permit in 1953, but never made it to the air, surrendering its license in 1955. WILM would have broadcast on channel 83, the only U.S. TV station in history to be allocated the very top of the UHF spectrum.

The station began on August 29, 1990, as independent outlet W10BZ. It aired an analog signal on VHF channel 10 from a transmitter near the studios. W10BZ changed its call sign to WSSN-LP in 1995. It joined the United Paramount Network (UPN) in the fall of 1997. In 1999, Capitol Broadcasting acquired the station.

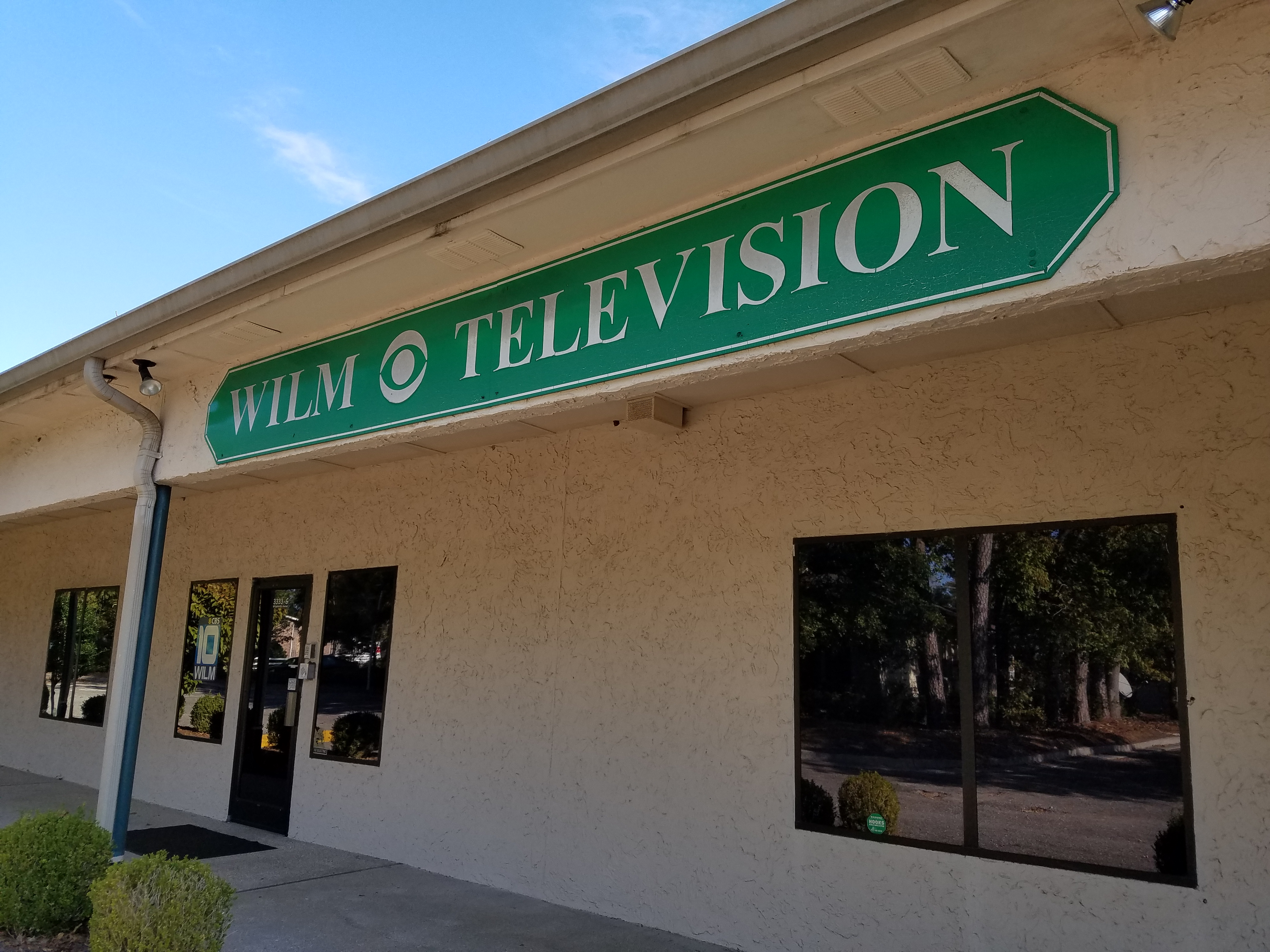
WILM studios

On March 23, 2000, it became a CBS affiliate, filling a void created when previous CBS affiliate WJKA changed its calls to WSFX-TV and dropped the network to join Fox. WSSN changed its call sign to WILM-LP on that date as well. Before WILM gained the CBS affiliation, programming from that network was seen in Wilmington on cable from WNCT-TV in Greenville, WBTW in Florence, South Carolina, or WRAL.

WILM retained its UPN affiliation on a secondary basis until the network shut down and merged with The WB. After UPN and The WB merged to form The CW on September 18, 2006, cable-only WB 100+ affiliate "WBW" joined the new network through the CW Plus cable group. Fox's sister programming service MyNetworkTV was formed around the same time and aligned with new sign-on W47CK, leaving WILM as a full-time CBS station.

The station's low-power digital signal began broadcasting on UHF channel 40 in August 2008. This increased the station's effective radiated power from its former 75 watts (analog VHF) to 15 kW (digital UHF) which is the highest power available for U.S. low-power digital television. WILM's new transmitter was no longer centrally located in Wilmington itself but located alongside other local broadcast sites in Delco.

WILM is one of five Wilmington commercial television stations that agreed to end analog transmissions early and became digital-only on September 8, 2008. This move was intended to make the area the first all-digital market in the United States. On that date, WILM shut down its analog signal along with four other Wilmington television stations as part of the voluntary early digital transition. If this agreement had not happened, the decision to shut off analog transmission at any time would have been voluntary for WILM because Federal Communications Commission (FCC) regulations exempted low-power television stations from the 2009 analog shutdown. Its analog channel 10 identification is still used as its virtual channel.

In 2015, WILM signed on a translator on channel 24, WILT-LD (now W33FF-D), to better serve areas such as Monkey Junction, Carolina Beach, and Wrightsville Beach south to Southport and Oak Island.

In January 2016, sister station and Capitol Broadcasting flagship WRAL announced it would drop its CBS affiliation due to a contract impasse, effective February 29, 2016. Immediately, WRAL struck a pending affiliation agreement to switch to NBC. On March 30, 2016, CBS announced it would pull its affiliation from WILM and transfer it to the second subchannel of WWAY on January 1, 2017. WILM subsequently became an independent station, adding additional syndicated programming, and promising increased coverage of local college sports.

== Newscasts ==
WILM-LD simulcasts WRAL's newscasts weekdays from 6 to 7 a.m. and at 6 p.m., with local weather inserts for the Wilmington area. This practice dates to its tenure with CBS; its studios were not large enough for a full-fledged news department.

From March 10, 2008, until February 27, 2009, through a news share agreement, WWAY produced a prime time newscast weeknights at 7 p.m.

== Technical information ==
=== Subchannels ===
The stations' signals are multiplexed:

Subchannels of WILM-LD and W33FF-D
| Subchannel | | Res. | Short name | Programming |
| WILM-LD | W33FF-D | Res. | Short name | Programming |
|---|---|---|---|---|
| 10.1 | 24.1 | 720p | WILM HD | Independent (primary); MeTV (secondary) |
| 10.2 | 24.2 | 480i | WILM ME | MeTV (full-time) |
| 10.3 | 24.3 | 480i | WILM 3 | Heroes & Icons |

=== Translators ===
- W30ER-D Wilmington (ATSC 3.0)
- W33FF-D Wilmington
