= Cotton Exchange of Wilmington =

Shopping complex in North Carolina, US

Coordinates: 34.2395°N 77.9493°W

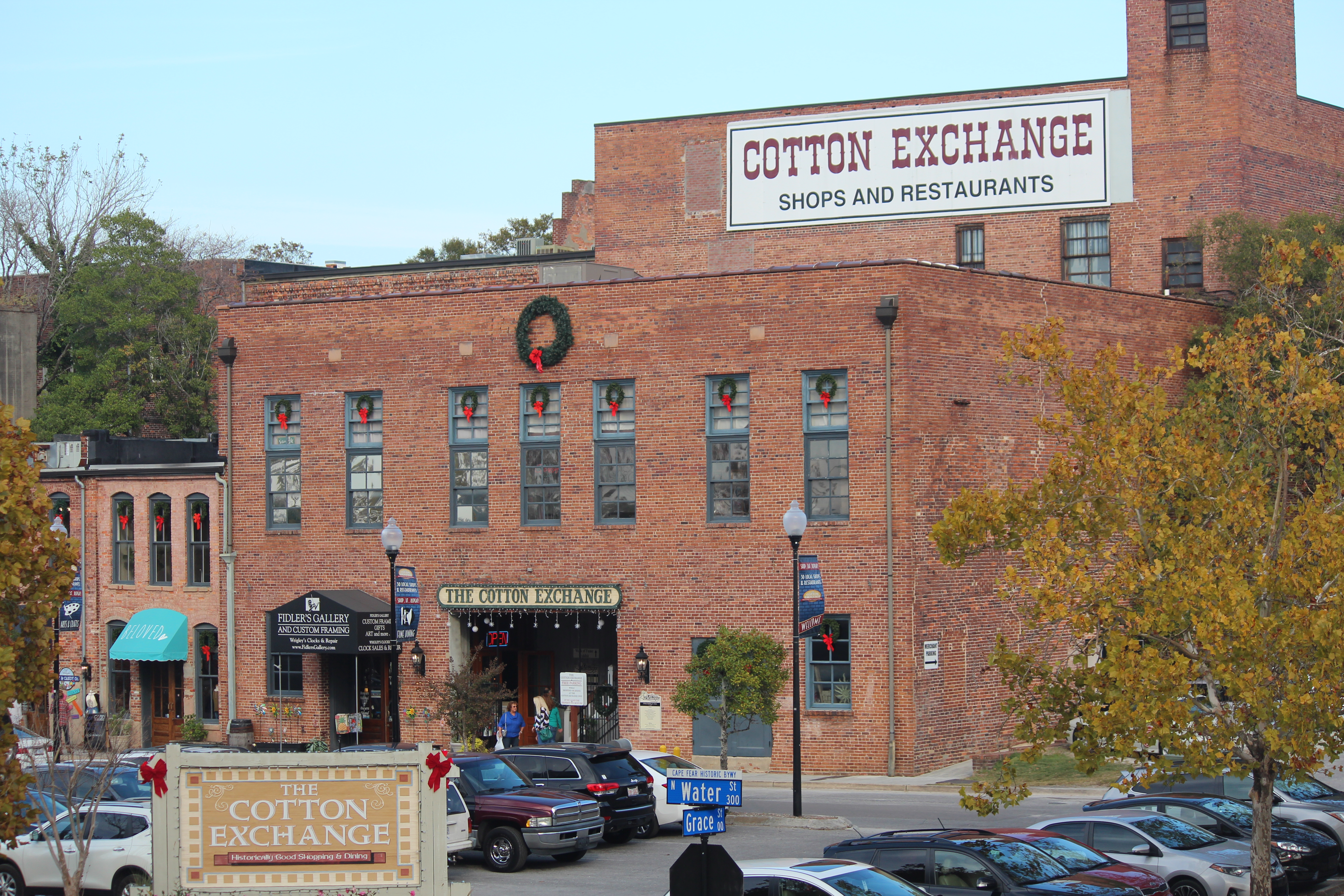
The Cotton Exchange in downtown Wilmington, North Carolina.

The Cotton Exchange of Wilmington, North Carolina, is a shopping complex consisting of over eight historical buildings dating back to the late 19th and early 20th centuries. It is so named due to the inclusion of the Old James Sprunt Cotton Exchange building; a business that claimed to be the largest exporter of cotton on the east coast until its dissolution in 1950. The Cotton Exchange is located on what is now North Front Street in downtown Wilmington. It currently comprises over 20 shops and restaurants, all within the confines of restored historical structures. The center is currently privately owned by Jean and John Bullock who purchased it in 1990.

== History ==
Promotional Pamphlet (1976)

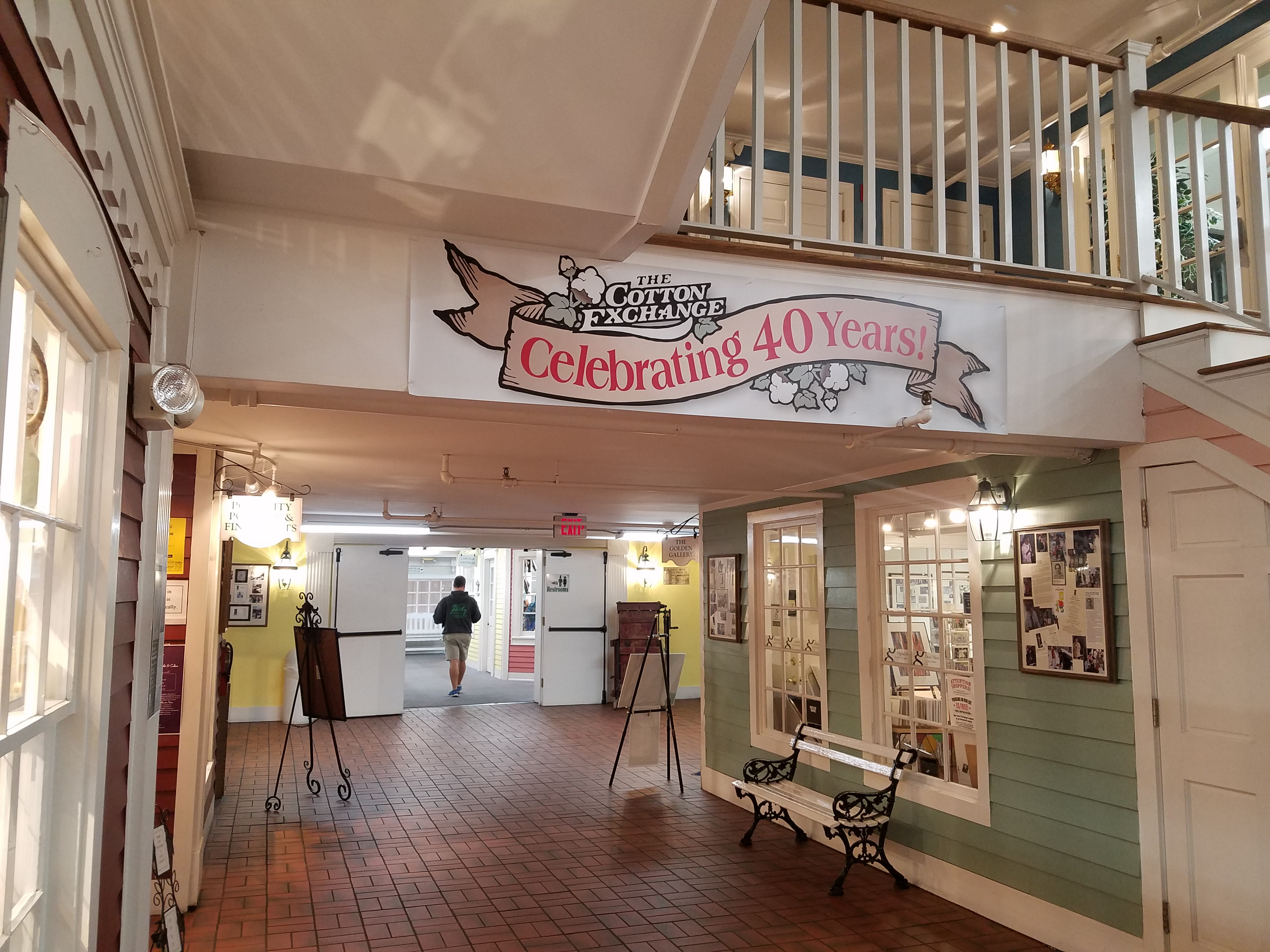
The Cotton Exchange interior

By the 1970s, the once bustling railroad hub and port city of Wilmington, North Carolina had greatly deteriorated. Many industries had left when the Atlantic Coastline Railroad decided to move its headquarters to Florida in 1961. Dilapidated buildings now stood where once had been a prosperous economy. In an attempt to recreate Wilmington, the Wilmington Redevelopment Commission began demolishing buildings in an attempt to make room for new ones (Demolition was, at the time, cheaper than renovation costing $21 per sq. ft. and $26 per sq. ft. respectively).

By 1974 several buildings had been razed in and around downtown, and several more were scheduled to be destroyed; this included a group of eight buildings currently in use as furniture storage on what was then Nutt Street. However, just as demolitions were about to get under way, a limited partnership of general partners J.R. Reaves and M.T. Murray bought the eight buildings from the Wilmington Redevelopment Commission for the sum of $242,416. They planned to renovate the building and rent it out as retail space. After visiting several other cities that had undergone renovations, including Charleston, Savannah, Atlanta, and San Francisco, Reaves and Murray developed a business plan for their new space.

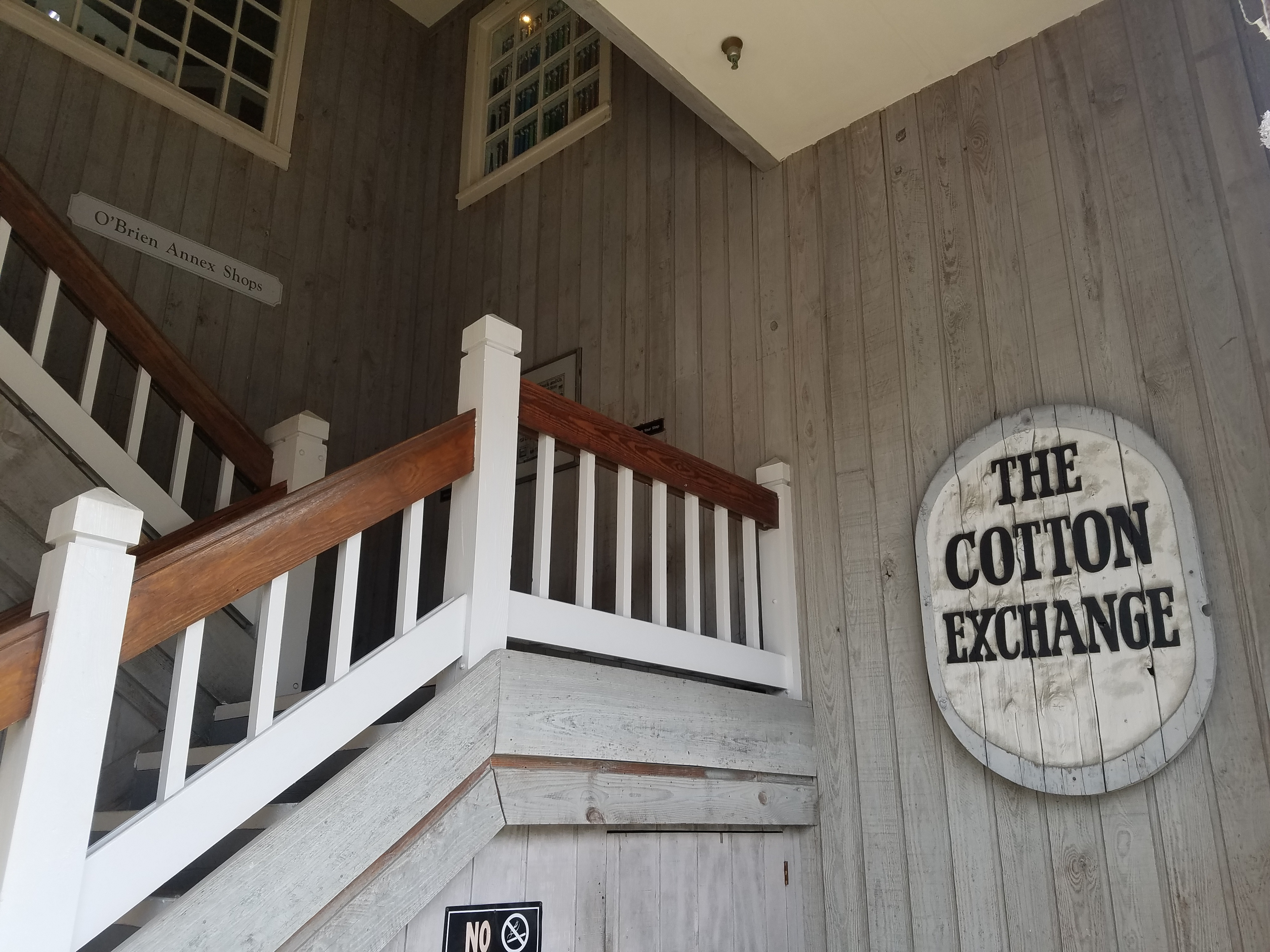
The Cotton Exchange entrance

They planned to keep most of the structures intact, adding only some modern amenities to the already existing buildings. They wanted to create a “Historic Adventure in Trade”, where pedestrians could go and enjoy modern shopping in an old space. After a minor setback due to smoke damage from the fire of 1974, renovation went smoothly. Reaves and Murray exposed walls made from old ships ballast, and wooden beams 40 feet long and hand-hewn. They imported period furniture to go along with the group of buildings, and placed gigantic lamps once belonging to Wilmington’s old customs house at the entrance to the stores. The Cotton Exchange opened in 1976, and within the first year of its operation had already received awards of merit from the North Carolina Chapter of the American Institute of Architects and the North Carolina Preservation Society. It brought over 200 new jobs into the area, and continues to expand both economically and physically. The complex now has five sections: The Wood Seed Building (a building that once housed a Chinese laundromat and a seed company), The Bear Building (an early 20th-century grocery), The O’Brien Building (originally Sears, Roebuck and Co.), The Granary Building, and The DahnHardt Building (a late 19th-century saloon building).

== Further Information on Historical Buildings ==
The Cotton Exchange prior to renovations

Much of the historical importance of what is now called the Cotton Exchange is derived from the eight buildings of which it was originally composed. Initially it spanned from 308-16 Nutt Street (Now North Front Street). This was an area with a rich industrial background, heavily connected to the city's function as a chief shipping port. • 308-308 ½ Nutt Street comprised a wholesale grocer and a warehouse used by the Boney and Harper Mill (the dominant industry on the block).

• 310 ½ Nutt Street was a warehouse used for flour by 1900, though it had originally (1893) been part of an outdoor beer garden adjacent to a saloon.

• 310-312 Nutt Street contained a two-story boarding house and saloon circa 1886. Formerly, it had been a three-story mariner’s saloon, though this structure was destroyed in the fire of February 21, 1886. By 1893 the boarding house function of the business had been abandoned, though the saloon was still operational. In 1900 the building was purchased by Cooper Wholesale Grocers, who used the space to clean and shell peanuts.

• 314 Nutt Street housed a steam engine used to power the neighboring mill, Boney and Harper. The steam engine continued operations until 1915.

• 316 Nutt Street was the Boney and Harper Homing and Corn Mill, begun circa 1886. By 1912 it was said to be the only mill of its kind east of Tennessee. They produced four-thousand bushels of pearl hominy, grits, and corn meal a day.

Expansion since the original purchase added buildings such as the previously mentioned Sprunt Cotton Exchange, and the former pub and brothel known as Paddy’s Hollow.
