= Liberty Corporation =

American media company (1919–2006)

The Liberty Corporation
- Company type: Public
- Traded as: NYSE: LC
- Industry: Broadcast Television, Insurance
- Founded: 1919
- Defunct: January 31, 2006
- Fate: Acquired by Raycom Media
- Successor: Raycom Media; Gray Media
- Headquarters: Greenville, South Carolina, United States
- Area served: United States (Nationwide)
- Key people: Elliott Estes; A. H. Twitchell; W. Frank Hipp; Herman Hipp; W. Hayne Hipp
- Products: CableVantage; Take Ten Productions; Broadcasting Merchandising Corporation

The Liberty Corporation was a media corporation originally based in Greenville, South Carolina. At its peak, Liberty owned 15 network-affiliated television stations across the Midwest and Southern regions of the United States. Cable advertising sales group CableVantage Inc., video production facility Take Ten Productions and broadcast equipment distributor Broadcast Merchandising Corporation were also some of its assets.

Liberty was founded in 1919 when W. Frank Hipp, a former top agent at Spartanburg-based Southeastern Life Insurance Company, struck out on his own. Within a decade, Liberty had grown large enough to buy his former employer. It entered broadcasting in 1930, when it bought WIS in Columbia—the start of what would become the Broadcasting Company of the South, renamed Cosmos Broadcasting in 1965. Under Francis Hipp, who succeeded his father in 1943, Liberty reorganized as a holding company, The Liberty Corporation, in 1967.

Liberty sold its insurance subsidiaries, Liberty Life and Pierce National Life, to Royal Bank of Canada in 2000. Cosmos was then folded directly into the Liberty banner.

After the sale of its insurance division, the company employed approximately 1,400 people. The executive officers included chairman and CEO W. Hayne Hipp (who, with his family, owned about 25% of the company before its sale to Raycom Media), president and COO James M. Keelor, CFO Howard L. Schrott.

On August 25, 2005, Liberty agreed to be bought out by Raycom Media. Raycom paid $987 million, or $47.35 per Liberty share, and assumed Liberty's debts of approximately $110 million in the buyout. The acquisition was completed on January 31, 2006. After closing the deal, Raycom sold a number of stations, including two from the Liberty portfolio. They included ABC affiliate WWAY-TV in Wilmington, North Carolina to Morris Multimedia and CBS affiliate KGBT-TV in Harlingen, Texas to Barrington Broadcasting. Also included with the merger was a construction permit for a new station in the Myrtle Beach–Florence, South Carolina market that Liberty applied for in 1996 and was granted by the FCC in October 2005, shortly after the merger announcement; Raycom would use the permit to build and sign-on WMBF-TV on August 7, 2008.

Liberty stations at the time of the merger are now under the ownership of Gray Media, which acquired Raycom in 2019.

== Former stations ==
Stations are arranged in order by state and city of license.

- (**) – Indicates station was built and signed-on by Liberty.

Stations owned by Liberty Corporation
Media market	State	Station	Purchased	Sold	Notes
Montgomery–Selma	Alabama	WSFA-TV	1959	2006	
Jonesboro	Arkansas	KAIT	1986	2006	
Albany	Georgia	WALB	1998	2006	
Evansville	Indiana	WFIE	1981	2006	
Louisville	Kentucky	WAVE	1981	2006	
Lake Charles	Louisiana	KPLC	1986	2006	
New Orleans	Louisiana	WDSU	1972	1989	
Marquette–Escanaba	Michigan	WJMN-TV	1981	1984	(Note: Semi-satellite of WFRV-TV.)
Biloxi–Gulfport	Mississippi	WLOX	1995	2006	
Jackson	Mississippi	WLBT	2000	2006	
Wilmington	North Carolina	WWAY	1999	2006	
Toledo	Ohio	WTOL	1965	2006	
Columbia	South Carolina	WIS **	1953	2006	
Myrtle Beach–Florence	South Carolina	WMBF-TV	–		(Note: Raycom acquired WMBF's construction permit from Liberty, applied for in 1996 and granted in 2005, prior to the station's sign-on in 2008.)
Harlingen–Brownsville	Texas	KGBT-TV	1998	2006	
Lubbock	Texas	KCBD	2000	2006	
Tyler–Longview	Texas	KLTV	2002	2006	
Lufkin–Nacogdoches	Texas	KTRE	2002	2006	(Note: Semi-satellite of KLTV.)
Green Bay	Wisconsin	WFRV-TV	1981	1984	
