= Morris Multimedia =

American media company

Morris Multimedia, Inc.
- Type: Private
- Industry: Media conglomerate
- Founded: 1970
- Headquarters: Savannah, Georgia, United States
- Website: MorrisMultimedia.com

Morris Multimedia, Inc. is an American media company based in Savannah, Georgia, founded in 1970 by Charles H. Morris. Morris Multimedia is the parent company of Morris Newspaper Corporation and Morris Network. The company's offices are in the Oliver Sturges House at 27 Abercorn Street in Savannah.

== Publications ==
The Morris Newspaper Corporation division owns and operates publications including dailies, shoppers, and specialty magazines in four states:

=== Georgia ===
- Bryan County News
- Coastal Courier
- Connect Savannah
- Effingham Herald
- Effingham Living
- Statesboro Herald
- Statesboro Magazine
- Statesboro MOMents
- The Reidsville Journal Sentinel

=== Iowa ===
- Clayton County Times Register
- The Guttenberg Press
- The Guttenberg Trader

=== Kansas ===
- Ellsworth County Independent Reporter
- Great Bend Tribune
- Marquette Tribune

=== Wisconsin ===
- The Boscobel Dial
- Prairie du Chien Courier Press
- Crawford County Independent and Kickapoo Scout
- Fennimore Times
- Grant County Herald Independent
- The Monroe Times
- Muscoda Progressive
- The Platteville Journal
- Lancaster Reminder
- Republican Journal
- Cuba City Round Up
- The Richland Observer
- The Prairie du Chien Trader
- Cuba City Tri County Press

== Television ==
Morris Multimedia has its own broadcasting division, Morris Network, who owns and operates several television stations. In 2003, Morris Multimedia announced that they would sell KARK in Little Rock, Arkansas and WDHN in Dothan, Alabama to Nexstar Broadcasting Group for an undisclosed price. Later that year, it purchased WCBI in Columbus from Imes Communications for an undisclosed price. Between 2006 and 2008, Morris Multimedia purchased two television stations from Media General. These were WDEF-TV in Chattanooga and WTVQ-DT in Lexington. The former was part of the acquisition that Media General also saw that they would purchase the smaller NBC O&Os, while the latter was to reduce debt flow Media General had invested in. Also in 2006, it purchased WWAY from Raycom Media for $18.5 million as part of divestitures regarding Raycom's acquisition of Liberty Corporation.

=== Current stations ===
Media market	State	Station	Purchased	Affiliation	Notes
Macon	Georgia	WMGT-TV	1978	NBC	
Biloxi–Gulfport	Mississippi	WXXV-TV	1997	Fox/MyTV; NBC (DT2); CW+ (DT3)	
Columbus–Tupelo–West Point	Mississippi	WCBI-TV	2004	CBS; Fox (DT2); MyTV (DT3)	
Columbus–Tupelo–West Point	Mississippi	WLOV-TV	2024	CW+	(Note: Owned by Coastal Television Broadcasting Company.)
Wilmington	North Carolina	WWAY	2006	ABC; CBS (DT2); CW+ (DT3)	
Wilmington	North Carolina	WWAY-LD	2022	QVC	
Chattanooga	Tennessee	WDEF-TV	2006	CBS	

=== Former stations ===
Media market	State	Station	Purchased	Sold	Notes
Dothan	Alabama	WDHN	1986	2003	
Little Rock	Arkansas	KARK-TV	1988	2003	
Valdosta–Albany	Georgia	WVGA	1986	1992	
Lexington	Kentucky	WTVQ-DT	2008	2026	

== Morris Technology ==
Morris also owns Morris Technology, a company specializing in infrastructural services for the media industry.
