= Independent Republic Quarterly =

Publication from South Carolina

The Independent Republic Quarterly is a publication of the Historical Society in Horry County, South Carolina founded in 1967. It is one of the few secondary sources on the Grand Strand and Myrtle Beach areas.
