= Winnabow, North Carolina =

- Census-designated place
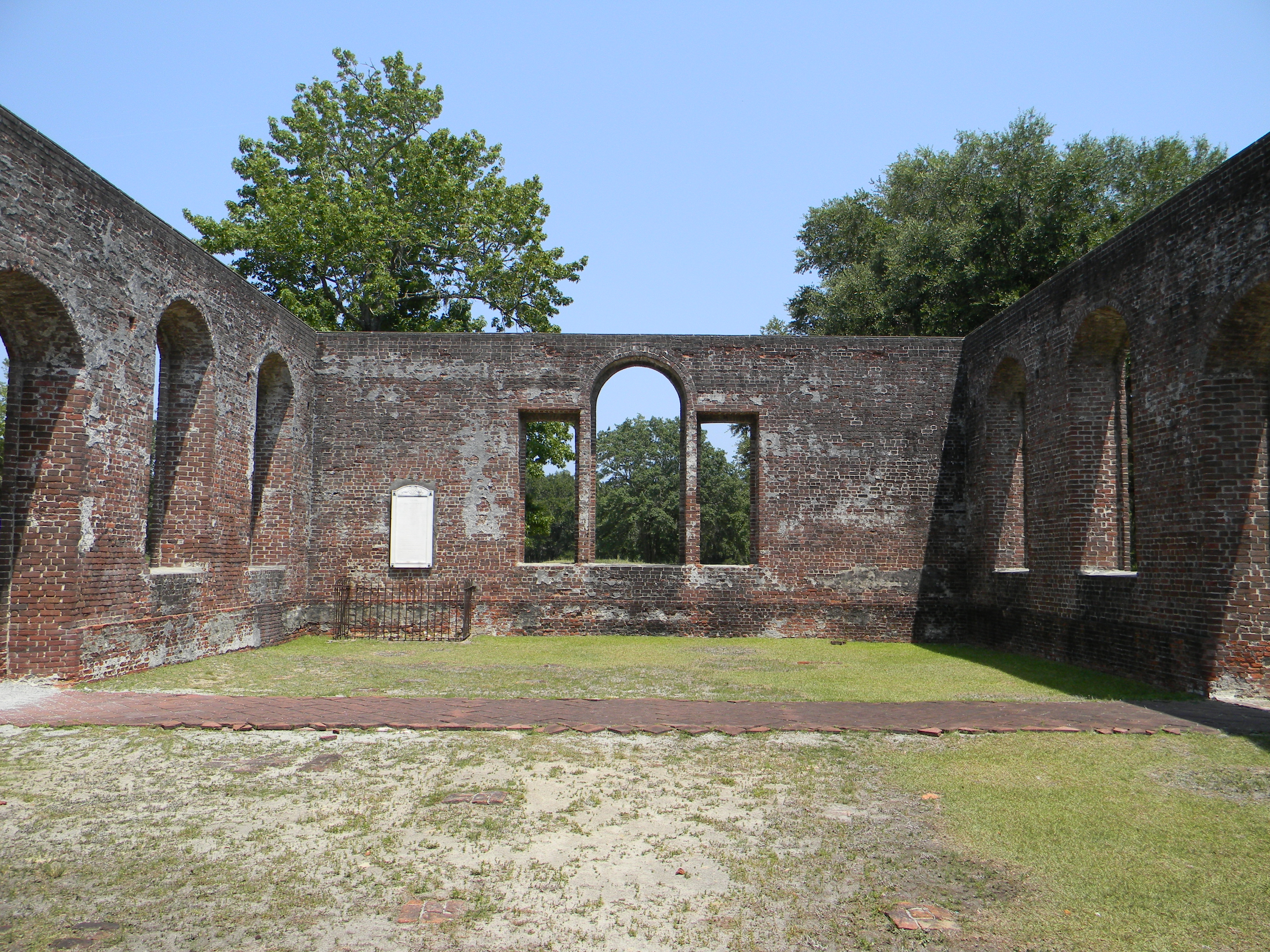
- St. Philip's Church in Winnabow

- Location in North Carolina Location in the United States
- Country: United States
- State: North Carolina
- County: Brunswick
- Elevation: 26 ft (7.9 m)
- Time zone: UTC-5 (Eastern (EST))
  - Summer (DST): UTC-4 (EDT)
- Area codes: 910, 472
- GNIS ID: 1023285

Winnabow is an unincorporated community and census-designated place in Brunswick County in the U.S. state of North Carolina. It is mainly a farming community along U.S. Route 17. There is no large retail presence in the area, except a Han Dee Hugo's convenience store at the intersection of NC 87 and US 17 South. Mill Creek Farm and Garden Center is the feed store for the area and is located beside Willetts Farm. Winnabow has a post office.

In 2022, residents of the community petitioned for the area to be incorporated, but the proposal was rejected by the North Carolina Local Government Commission.
