= WLTR =

- Columbia, South Carolina; United States
- Broadcast area: Columbia metropolitan area
- Frequency: 91.3 MHz (HD Radio)
- Branding: 91.3 WLTR

Programming
- Format: Public radio; Classical music
- Affiliations: National Public Radio; Public Radio Exchange; American Public Media

Ownership
- Owner: South Carolina Public Radio; (South Carolina Educational TV Commission)

History
- First air date: July 1, 1976

Technical information
- Licensing authority: FCC
- Facility ID: 60984
- Class: C1
- ERP: 98,000 watts
- HAAT: 232 meters (761 ft)
- Transmitter coordinates: 34°7′7.5″N 80°56′11.3″W

Links
- Public license information: Public file; LMS
- Webcast: Listen live
- Website: southcarolinapublicradio.org

WLTR (91.3 FM) is a noncommercial public radio station in Columbia, South Carolina, United States. The station primarily features news and information radio format with programs from National Public Radio, along with classical and other genres of music during late mornings, nights and weekends. WLTR is the flagship station of the statewide "News and Music Network" from South Carolina Public Radio.

WLTR broadcast with an effective radiated power (ERP) of 100,000 watts, the maximum allowed for non-grandfathered FM stations. The transmitter is located on Hardscrabble Road near Sloan Road in Columbia.

== History ==
WLTR first signed on the air on July 1, 1976. Over time, additional non-commercial FM stations were added to the network around the state, operated jointly with South Carolina Educational Television (SCETV). These FM stations largely simulcast programming from originating on flagship station WLTR, featuring a mix of NPR news and information on weekday mornings and afternoons, with classical music predominantly played during middays, nights and weekends. By the end of the 1990s, many non-commercial NPR stations nationwide began phasing out music programming from their schedules and focusing on news, talk and information formats.

In 2001, the South Carolina Educational Radio Network stations split its statewide network. Stations WRJA-FM in Sumter, WJWJ-FM in Beaufort and WHMC-FM in Conway started broadcasting all NPR and local news and information programming. WLTR maintained its format, continuing to feature news and information in mornings and afternoons, with some classical music and other musical programs, middays, nights and weekends. 89.3 WSCI Charleston and 90.1 WEPR Greenville continue to simulcast WLTR.
