= WHMC =

WHMC may refer to:

- WHMC (TV), a television station (channel 28, virtual 23) licensed to Conway, South Carolina, United States
- WHMC-FM, a radio station (90.1 FM) licensed to Conway, South Carolina, United States
- WHMC (AM) (1150 kHz) a defunct radio station that operated in Gaithersburg, Maryland from the 1960s to the 80s (see WMET)
- Wyckoff Heights Medical Center, a hospital in Brooklyn, New York, United States
