= WTVI =

Television station in Charlotte, North Carolina

- Charlotte, North Carolina; United States
- Channels: Digital: 9 (VHF); Virtual: 42
- Branding: PBS Charlotte

Programming
- Affiliations: 42.1: PBS

Ownership
- Owner: Central Piedmont Community College (sale to the University of North Carolina pending)

History
- First air date: August 27, 1965
- Former channel numbers: Analog: 42 (UHF, 1965–2009); Digital: 11 (VHF, 2002–2020)
- Former affiliations: NET (1965–1970); NHK World (42.2, 2016–2025)
- Call sign meaning: Television Information

Technical information
- Licensing authority: FCC
- Facility ID: 10645
- ERP: 2.57 kW
- HAAT: 359 m (1,178 ft)
- Transmitter coordinates: 35°17′15″N 80°41′44″W
- Translator(s): 28 (UHF) Hickory

Links
- Public license information: Public file; LMS
- Website: www.wtvi.org

WTVI (channel 42) is a PBS member television station in Charlotte, North Carolina, United States, owned by Central Piedmont Community College. The station's studios are located on Commonwealth Avenue in east Charlotte, and its transmitter is located in the unincorporated area of Newell in northeastern Mecklenburg County. It is one of three PBS stations serving the Charlotte metropolitan area and the only public television station in the Carolinas that is not part of either state's statewide network—PBS North Carolina and South Carolina Educational Television.

Though Charlotte had been allocated channel 42 for educational use in 1952, the city pursued educational broadcasting first through airtime on commercial stations and then through the facilities of Charlotte's commercial WUTV (channel 36), which were offered at no cost. However, the school system was ineligible for membership in National Educational Television if it operated using a commercial station, and the owners of WUTV began charging for airtime. In 1962, Charlotte-Mecklenburg Schools acquired the equipment of the failed WTVI in Fort Pierce, Florida, for use as the basis to start a local educational TV station. WTVI began broadcasting on August 27, 1965, providing daytime programs for schools and evening programs for the community. Its manager, Dona Lee Davenport, was the first woman to run an educational TV station.

In the late 1970s, WTVI began community fundraising but was stymied by strained relations between the school board and station supporters. The school board began exploring ways to transfer WTVI out of its control, including a merger with the statewide UNC-TV network (now PBS North Carolina), but any merger would have seen WTVI's local facility closed, which generated concerns about how such a setup would serve Charlotte interests. In 1981, the station was spun off as a community licensee, the Charlotte–Mecklenburg Public Broadcasting Authority, which received county support. Through the 1980s and 1990s, WTVI expanded its technical facilities and local programming, though it changed approaches as to how to distinguish its prime-time lineup from that of UNC-TV and South Carolina ETV. For five years, commercial station WBTV produced a 10 p.m. newscast for WTVI.

Under Elise Garner, who took over as general manager in 2003, WTVI initially succeeded with a highly differentiated lineup and scheduling practice of PBS shows, but over time it lost viewers and donors. The onset of the Great Recession caused shortfalls in viewer support and prompted Mecklenburg County to discontinue its funding support for WTVI. The station was nearly insolvent when it merged into Central Piedmont Community College (CPCC) in 2012. CPCC integrated its existing television operation and academic programs into WTVI, and the station's finances improved. After the Rescissions Act of 2025 eliminated federal funding for public broadcasting, in November 2026, WTVI announced it would merge into PBS North Carolina in a deal that will keep the Charlotte studio open. In addition to airing national public television programs, WTVI produces local programming focusing on the Charlotte area.

== History ==
=== Construction and early years ===
In 1952, the Federal Communications Commission (FCC) allocated channel 42 in Charlotte, North Carolina, for use by an educational television station. In 1953, a group of civic leaders including a committee convened by the mayor of Charlotte resolved to seek financial and other support to put such a station on the air. Three years later, under superintendent Elmer Garinger, the Charlotte school system pushed to provide the city's schools with educational television in some form: a closed-circuit network, rebroadcasting of WUNC-TV of Chapel Hill into the Charlotte area, or the construction of channel 42. Another option was also available to the Charlotte schools. Charlotte's then-silent commercial station WQMC-TV (channel 36 (Note: This is the same station that became WCCB on channel 18.)) offered its facilities for educational broadcasting. In 1957, programs from WUNC-TV began to become available in the Charlotte area, rebroadcast by WSOC-TV (channel 9). By 1959, both WSOC-TV and WBTV (channel 3) were making time available to broadcast WUNC-produced programs for Charlotte schools' benefit. When WBTV and WSOC-TV inadvertently cleared the same half-hour on their schedules in 1959, for a time leaving schools to choose one or the other program being made available, the idea of building a microwave transmission relay from Chapel Hill was floated. Channel 42 was a long-term plan at this point, impractical due to its cost but seen as the eventual answer. On July 1, 1960, the school systems of Charlotte and Mecklenburg County merged to form Charlotte-Mecklenburg Schools.

The teachers looked at these programs and said, 'Why I can do better than that', and they could. Those shows were for the rural areas where teachers had no access to up-to-date resources. The philosophy of ETV in the Charlotte–Mecklenburg system was not the same philosophy the state embraced.

— Dona Lee Davenport, on how Charlotte's educational television programs differed from those produced by WUNC

That year, a different plan came about when a group of local businessmen proposed putting channel 36 back on the air and donating its airtime for school use. The station, then bearing the call sign WUTV, intended to be on the air by September 1, 1960, but it debuted a year behind schedule in time for the 1961 fall semester, on September 5, 1961. In preparation, 25 junior and senior high schools in Charlotte were made capable of receiving WUTV's ultra high frequency (UHF) telecasts. The advent of WUTV doubled the number of programs from Chapel Hill that were available in Charlotte. The arrangement between the schools and WUTV's ownership, the Century Advertising Company, provided free use of the channel 36 facility during the day for three years. In 1962, the 75 elementary schools in the city were equipped, and the program of locally originated French-language classes was expanded. Outside of programs for schools, WUTV operated on a minimum schedule to keep its broadcast license, airing filmed travelogues in the evenings. It lacked facilities to produce live programming, so all material was pre-recorded or rebroadcast from WUNC. However, because WUTV operated on a commercial license, Charlotte–Mecklenburg schools could not become a member of National Educational Television (NET), a distributor of educational programming, using channel 36. The school board asked Century to enter into a share-time relationship much like that used at the time by WMSB at Michigan State University, in which Michigan State held its own license and a commercial group shared the channel, but Century did not agree to this. NET officials urged the school system to set up its own TV service. Dona Lee Davenport, a Charlotte teacher who became involved with local television, looked on at the WUNC programs and found they did not meet the needs of Charlotte–Mecklenburg schools.

On May 1, 1962, the Charlotte–Mecklenburg Board of Education agreed to buy the equipment and assets of WTVI (channel 19), a failed commercial UHF station in Fort Pierce, Florida. Its owner, Gene Dyer, spent half the year in Highlands, North Carolina. For $86,200, the school board purchased studio equipment and towers to hold an antenna and a microwave relay. Aside from a building and land, the school system now had the basis to pursue construction of its own station. Later that month, the new superintendent, A. Craig Phillips, was authorized and instructed to prepare an application for channel 42. This application was completed and filed in November, and on March 18, 1963, the FCC awarded the construction permit, which took the call sign WTVI. Davenport gave several meanings for the I, such as instruction. That same month, Century began charging for the airtime on WUTV; it billed $5,000 for the remainder of the 1962–63 school year and proposed a fee of more than $30,000 for the 1963–64 school year. The board of education opted to close out the year on channel 36 and not to renew. Further, there was a dispute between the city and the school board as to where to place the studios for channel 42, planned to be co-located with an education center. The school board forged ahead with a site near the Charlotte Coliseum. Tower erection and building construction were underway by November 1963 for the new station. Though the 14,000-square-foot (1,300 m^{2}) building was complete by August 1964, when the station was slated for a debut later that year, the launch of channel 42 was postponed several times due to late arrival of equipment. Station manager Davenport was injured in a car accident, further delaying operations.

WTVI made its first broadcast on August 27, 1965, opening with two hours of NET programming. Davenport became the first woman to run a public television station. (Note: WTVI went on the air more than a month before Betty Cope was named manager of WVIZ in Cleveland in October 1965, though it was reported at that time in Cleveland that Cope was first.) Within six months, the station had 15 employees and was on the air 15 hours a day, including local programs for teachers. In 1968, WBTV donated its old black-and-white outside broadcasting unit to WTVI. Two years later, WSOC-TV donated color-capable film and slide equipment, allowing the station to begin broadcasting some programming in color. Early programs included the public affairs series Observations, featuring the reporters of The Charlotte Observer, and the 1972 series You're On, which opened channel 42's cameras to the public to express their views. WTVI was not the only source of public television programming in metro Charlotte. The University of North Carolina, owner of WUNC, extended its television service into a statewide network and opened WUNG-TV (channel 58), licensed to Concord, in September 1967. South Carolina Educational Television opened a translator at Rock Hill in January 1969 and replaced it with the high-power WNSC-TV (channel 30) in 1978. In 1970, NET was supplanted by PBS as the network for public broadcasting.

=== From school to community ownership ===
The Friends of WTVI, a support and volunteer group for the station, was formed in February 1975 to support the station's public television operations. At the time, the station could not conduct on-air fundraising because North Carolina law prohibited tax-funded organizations, such as the Charlotte–Mecklenburg school board, from holding fund drives. To resolve this issue, the school board approved the creation of WTVI Inc., an affiliate charged with raising funds from the local community for the station's operation. The next year, WTVI raised funds in a drive to buy a new, color-capable outside broadcasting van. The advent of outside support coincided with competing funding priorities for the school board and the county, which trimmed their appropriations for channel 42. That year, Davenport was transferred from working for the school board to working for WTVI Inc. after six managers complained that WTVI had missed out on opportunities to obtain federal funds that would have improved its financial position. One major purpose of WTVI Inc., was to eventually become self-sufficient so that it might one day take over the station from the school board. At the time, the adoption of video tape recorders made educational stations less necessary at the school level than they once had been, and the number of public TV stations operated by school systems was dwindling. WMFE-TV in Orlando, Florida, which had similarly transitioned to a community licensee, had a budget twice as large as WTVI despite being in a smaller market.

In January 1979, the school board voted to study ways to spin off WTVI. At the same time, WTVI Inc. struggled to raise money on its own and suffered from image problems. The continued presence of Davenport contributed to poor relations between company and school board. Bob Wisehart of The Charlotte News noted that it "seems to function in a climate of paranoia", while Ron Alridge of The Charlotte Observer called it "too secretive and elitist" and pondered that the failure of WTVI Inc. might be the best outcome for the station. In May, WTVI Inc. fired Davenport, whom Alridge hailed for her efficiency in organizing the station and getting it to air but received poor marks for her handling of people and personnel issues. Upon her death in 2001, she was remembered for her ability to attract community support to the station in its infancy.

In the wake of Davenport's firing, station staff resumed handling on-air fundraising activities, and channel 42 pushed into more local programming by debuting the nightlife and music series After Dark and the newsmagazine Sunday at Six. These joined Final Edition, a public affairs roundtable that debuted in February 1979. During this time, a new solution to WTVI's financial situation was being discussed: transfer WTVI, the only independent public television station in North Carolina, to the University of North Carolina for integration into its network. While UNC-TV was seen as Chapel Hill–centric and likely to benefit from adding production facilities in Charlotte, and WUNG-TV was not receivable in all metro-area households, the idea raised questions as to the autonomy and long-term role of Charlotte in such a setup and whether UNC-TV could adequately serve the needs of Charlotte. In late 1980, representatives of WTVI and UNC-TV conferred about a possible merger. However, UNC-TV management's plan for WTVI involved closing the Charlotte studio. Jake Dunlop, director of the Center for Public Television, believed maintaining facilities in Charlotte would be expensive and duplicative to the Chapel Hill operation and suggested stationing a mobile unit in Charlotte instead. By January 1981, merger plans had dried up.

After UNC merger talks failed to yield results, the task force proposed in January 1981 that the station be spun out of the school board to a community licensee, the Charlotte–Mecklenburg Public Broadcasting Authority. The idea was favorably received by the school board, which voted unanimously to set up the authority in March. Under the arrangement, WTVI leased its studios from the school system for a peppercorn rent and received more fundraising powers. At the time, the station only had two corporate underwriters and had never held an on-air auction, a common fundraiser for public TV stations elsewhere.

=== The Bouton era ===
Hal Bouton left KIXE-TV in Redding, California, to become WTVI's general manager in 1983. Under Bouton, the station held its first auction in 1984, a five-night event supported by three local commercial stations. New telemarketing methods enabled the station to grow its base of members from 9,500 to 13,000 between 1985 and 1986. In 1985, WTVI began producing the exercise program Homestretch, hosted by Amy Esterhay. The program went into national distribution in 1987 and aired on between 50 and 80 public TV stations nationwide.

The Bouton era also saw expansion and upgrading of WTVI's physical plant. One of his first priorities was to replace the aged transmitter and improve channel 42's signal. The station received a federal grant in 1984, and the new transmitter went into service in 1985, increasing the coverage radius by about 7 miles (11 km). Once the new transmitter was in place, Bouton shifted focus to an expansion of production facilities and the studio, which the station was beginning to outgrow. Mecklenburg County voters approved a bond issue in 1987 to fund a $3.1 million, 20,000-square-foot (1,900 m^{2}) addition to add space and make the station, per Bouton, "look like a television studio and not like a school". Among the features of the addition, completed in 1990, was a stained glass window depicting the history of public television. A plan to replace WTVI's tower, the same tower moved to Charlotte from Fort Pierce in 1962, ran into more difficulty. The originally proposed site in Charlotte's Reedy Creek Park met with opposition from residents and was withdrawn. Voters approved a second bond issue for the tower in 1989, and in 1990 the station acquired 46 acres (19 ha) on Caldwell Road east of UNC Charlotte for the erection of a 1,200-foot (370 m) tower. The facility, completed in 1992, expanded WTVI's coverage radius to 85 miles (137 km).

During this period, WTVI purchased a smaller package of programs from PBS, which was unusual for PBS stations in markets the size of Charlotte. Under an agreement with UNC-TV, all non-timely PBS programs were timeshifted by at least 24 hours to reduce overlap to the main PBS schedule. The station changed tack in 1997 and began airing programs in the PBS national pattern in response to displeasure by viewers that the Ken Burns documentary on Thomas Jefferson would not air at its national time. Local programming produced by WTVI in the 1990s included Carolina Business Review, which debuted in 1991 and also began airing on South Carolina ETV and UNC-TV in 1995; the arts series Spotlight; and a teen call-in and panel show, The Zone.

Beginning June 26, 1995, WTVI entered into an agreement with WBTV to become the new home of the latter station's 10 p.m. local newscast, paying $91,000 a year for the program. WBTV had been producing a 10 p.m. newscast for WJZY (channel 46); even though the move meant the newscast would not include commercials, WBTV management considered the move promotional, and WJZY's airings of movies and Charlotte Hornets basketball games led to preemptions. This was believed to be the first newscast of its kind produced for a public station by a commercial station. WTVI likewise hoped to increase corporate support and visibility, at a time when Republicans in federal government and on the Mecklenburg County commission were signaling cuts to support of public broadcasting, by airing the newscast. Commercial competitors criticized the deal as a waste of public funds. The general manager of WCCB, which aired a competing newscast, complained to Mecklenburg County commissioners; the general manager at WSOC-TV lamented that WTVI did not put the project out to bid for his station or WCNC-TV. The newscast won critical plaudits for its focus on longer stories and interviews but did not gain ratings traction. Citing increasing competition in the 10 p.m. news market in Charlotte and scheduling conflicts with PBS, the WTVI newscast aired for the last time on September 8, 2000. At the time, WCNC-TV was preparing to launch a competing 10 p.m. newscast, and Bouton noted that he did not want to compete with the quality-oriented news output of WCNC. The arrangement had also become unprofitable for WBTV.

WTVI began broadcasting a digital signal on channel 11 on April 1, 2002.

=== Garner era and financial crisis ===
Bouton retired in 2003 and was replaced by Elise Garner, a longtime employee of WEDU in Tampa, Florida. In response to Mecklenburg County cutting its funding for the station by 45 percent, within months Garner laid off eight employees; canceled its public affairs programs, Final Edition and Charlotte Tonight; and discontinued its monthly program guide. In response to community outcry, the station revised its planned cuts to spare Final Edition. Later in 2003, WTVI aired the pilot of the cartoon series Danger Rangers, which went into national distribution the next year.

In 2004, WTVI made major changes to its scheduling practices, ceasing to air national PBS programs in pattern. It established themed nights for nature, history, and science shows among others as part of an effort to once again differentiate its schedule from UNC-TV and South Carolina ETV. The changes occurred even though WTVI viewership was up 30 percent year-over-year in prime time and fundraising was steady. The changes were initially successful. WTVI trailed only KBYU-TV in Provo, Utah, in audience share in markets with multiple public TV stations, and prime time ratings posted more gains. However, viewership and support began to decline as the station ceased to offer PBS's highest-profile programming. In turn, this meant that WTVI could afford fewer PBS series. On February 17, 2009, the originally planned digital TV transition date, the station turned off its analog signal; the digital signal continued to broadcast on channel 11, using virtual channel 42.

The onset of the Great Recession affected two critical sources of funding for WTVI. After its winter 2009 fund drive fell short, it immediately laid off four employees, with Garner expecting a reduction in Mecklenburg County support as the county trimmed its budget. Two months later, Final Edition went on hiatus, coming to an end after 30 years. By March 2010, station management was concerned that Mecklenburg County was about to cease supporting WTVI altogether, threatening 23 percent of its budget. The county proceeded with the cuts, leaving a smaller annual contribution for meeting and debate telecasts. In response, the station closed down its Public Square digital subchannel, replacing it with the no-cost MHz Worldview; ceased buying some PBS shows; and launched a $1 million fundraising campaign, which fell nearly 14 percent short of its goal.

Within a year or two, if nothing changes, the lights go out.

— C. Lal Vishin, treasurer, WTVI, on the station's financial situation in 2011

Mecklenburg County's 2011–12 budget provided no operating funds for WTVI, and fundraising and membership continued to drop. To cover a deficit of nearly $300,000, WTVI relied on its reserves, a situation that was untenable.

=== Central Piedmont Community College ownership ===
Amid continued shortfalls in viewer support and a lack of financial viability due to the fragmentation of public television in Charlotte, WTVI approached Central Piedmont Community College (CPCC) about a possible merger. CPCC programmed a cable channel that provided local programming to the community, including shows such as Trail of History and Charlotte Cooks, and job experience to students taking videography courses at the college. The college needed funding from the county to make a merger possible, but county manager Harry Jones rejected the idea as "a government-funded bailout of a failed business model" that should not be shouldered by taxpayers. The commissioners disagreed and, on a 6–3 vote, approved funding to permit CPCC to take over WTVI on March 21, 2012. The FCC approved the transfer in May 2012, and CPCC took over on July 1. WTVI became one of a handful of PBS stations operated by a community college.

WTVI was relaunched by CPCC in October 2012 under the brand name PBS Charlotte. It returned to primary PBS scheduling at this time. Several programs CPCC produced for cable were added to the WTVI lineup, and a new public affairs program, Off the Record, premiered. Garner retired and was replaced in 2013 by Amy Burkett, formerly of WLVT-TV serving the Lehigh Valley of Pennsylvania—like WTVI, a secondary PBS station in its market. That September, Burkett became the host of a new public affairs program, Carolina Impact. A CPCC classroom was built in the WTVI studio to support college programs. Burkett moved the station back to a differentiated program schedule in 2014, requiring one of the largest common carriage waivers in PBS's history, and outsourced master control functions to a facility in Syracuse, New York.

It took several years for WTVI to turn around its finances, but fundraising activity immediately increased. In the first half of the 2013–14 fiscal year, WTVI raised more money than it had in all of 2012–13. WTVI halved its deficit that year, on rising viewer and corporate support, and turned its first surplus of the CPCC era in 2014–15. WTVI was the last local station to change its channel as a result of the 2016 United States wireless spectrum auction, moving from channel 11 to channel 9 on July 3, 2020.

Two long-running WTVI programs came to an end in 2025 and 2026. Charlotte Cooks, hosted by CPCC culinary instructor Pam Roberts, concluded its run after 20 seasons. Carolina Business Review ended in 2026, when host Chris William retired. Also coming to an end in 2025 was federal support of public broadcasting in the wake of the Rescissions Act of 2025, which caused a 25% budget reduction by eliminating station support from the Corporation for Public Broadcasting (CPB).

=== Merger with PBS North Carolina ===
Though a surge in fundraising helped WTVI in the short term recover from the impact of the discontinuation of CPB funding, Central Piedmont Community College was concerned about the long-term viability of keeping WTVI running as a standalone service. On November 11, 2026, PBS North Carolina announced that it had reached a deal to acquire WTVI from Central Piedmont Community College, including continuing to use CPCC's Charlotte studio. The transaction requires FCC approval.

== Local programming ==
Carolina Impact is the station's flagship public affairs program. In 2025, WTVI debuted Unspun, a weekly politics program hosted by former North Carolina governor and Charlotte mayor Pat McCrory. It also debuted the cooking series Dapper Dad's Kitchen.

== Funding ==
For the year ending June 30, 2025, WTVI reported operating revenues of $5.55 million and $5.49 million in operating expenses, figures that each include more than $2 million in donated administrative support. More than half of the revenue, $2.9 million, came in the form of grants and contributions.

== Technical information ==
WTVI is broadcast from a primary transmitter located on Caldwell Road in northeast Mecklenburg County, as well as a digital replacement translator on physical channel 28 in Hickory. The station currently broadcasts one subchannel:

Subchannel of WTVI
Subchannel	Res.	Short name	Programming
42.1	1080i	WTVI HD	PBS
