= WNSC =

WNSC may refer to:

- WNSC-FM
- WNSC-TV
- WNSC, an abbreviation for White Nile Sugar Company
