= WJWJ =

WJWJ may refer to:

- WJWJ-FM, a radio station (89.9 FM) licensed to Beaufort, South Carolina, United States
- WJWJ-TV, a television station (channel 32, virtual 16) licensed to Beaufort, South Carolina, United States
