= WRJA =

WRJA may refer to:

- WRJA-FM, a radio station (88.1 FM) licensed to Sumter, South Carolina, United States
- WRJA-TV, a television station (channel 29, virtual 27) licensed to Sumter, South Carolina, United States
