= WAXN-TV =

Television station in Kannapolis, North Carolina

ATSC 3.0 station
- Kannapolis–Charlotte, North Carolina; United States
- City: Kannapolis, North Carolina
- Channels: Digital: 32 (UHF); Virtual: 64
- Branding: TV 64

Programming
- Affiliations: 64.1: Independent; 64.2: Laff; 64.3: Ion Mystery

Ownership
- Owner: Cox Media Group; (WSOC Television, LLC)
- Sister stations: WSOC-TV

History
- First air date: October 15, 1994
- Former call signs: WKAY (1994–1996)
- Former channel numbers: Analog: 64 (UHF, 1994–2009); Digital: 50 (UHF, until 2019)
- Former affiliations: Pax TV (secondary, 1998–2000)
- Call sign meaning: "Action" (station originally branded as "Action 64")

Technical information
- Licensing authority: FCC
- Facility ID: 12793
- ERP: 200 kW
- HAAT: 372 m (1,220 ft)
- Transmitter coordinates: 35°15′41.1″N 80°43′36.5″W
- Translator(s): 36 WAXNTV1 China Grove; 26 W26FA-D Marion; 30 WSOCTV1, Shelby; 46 WSOCTV2, Statesville

Links
- Public license information: Public file; LMS
- Website: www.wsoctv.com/tv64/

WAXN-TV (channel 64) is an independent television station licensed to Kannapolis, North Carolina, United States, serving the Charlotte area. It is owned by Cox Media Group alongside dual ABC/Telemundo affiliate WSOC-TV (channel 9). The two stations share studios on West 23rd Street north of uptown Charlotte; WAXN-TV's transmitter is located near Reedy Creek Park in the Newell section of the city.

== History ==
The station first signed on the air on October 15, 1994, as WKAY-TV. It was originally owned by Kannapolis Television Company, a subsidiary of Truth Temple in Kannapolis. It had originally received a construction permit as WDZH, but changed the call letters to WKAY on November 15, 1989. The pastor of Truth Temple, Garland Faw, named the station WKAY after his wife Kay. The station aired a mix of religious programming, older movies, and barter syndicated programs, as well as the locally produced special Magic or Something in 1995. Kannapolis Television entered into a joint sales agreement (JSA) with WSOC-TV owner Cox Enterprises, and formally changed the call letters to WAXN-TV in August 1996.

Under the agreement, channel 9 took over channel 64's operations and re-branded the station as "Action 64". The "Action" branding had also been used at the time on Cox's two other independent stations, WRDQ in Orlando and KICU-TV in San Jose, California, the latter of which is now owned by Fox Television Stations since 2014. Cox invested over $3 million toward relaunching the station and making other improvements. The station moved its operations to WSOC-TV's facilities and underwent a significant technical overhaul, boosting its transmitting power to a level comparable with other Charlotte area stations. Previously, it could only be seen on cable television in most of the market, as its over-the-air analog signal barely made it out of Cabarrus County.

WSOC-TV owned the rights to a large amount of syndicated programming, but increased local news commitments left channel 9 without nearly enough time in its broadcast day to air it all. Under the JSA, WSOC-TV bought WAXN's entire broadcast day and placed much of this surplus programming on WAXN, giving channel 64 a much stronger schedule. One of these shows was The Andy Griffith Show, which had aired on channel 9 for many years. From 2001 to 2012, WAXN had also been the Charlotte home of the Jerry Lewis MDA Labor Day Telethon, which had aired on WSOC-TV since 1974; Cox's overall local rights to the telethon ended with the 2012 edition, as the Muscular Dystrophy Association decided to move the telethon from syndication to ABC for the final two years of its existence (by then known as the MDA Show of Strength), effectively returning it to WSOC.

From 1998 to 2000, WAXN aired many programs from Pax TV (later i: Independent Television, now Ion Television), although the station was never formally affiliated with the network. Until WJZY (channel 46) added Ion as a digital subchannel in 2016, Charlotte was the largest market in the United States that never had an owned-and-operated station or affiliate of Pax/i/Ion. WAXN later began airing repeated episodes of Dr. Phil and The Oprah Winfrey Show that were seen earlier in the day on WSOC in prime time.

On August 5, 1999, the Federal Communications Commission (FCC) reversed its long standing regulations against duopoly ownerships in the same television market. As stipulated in the original joint sales agreement, Cox was now able to acquire the station outright, doing so for the purchase price of $3 million. The sale was officially approved by the FCC in 2000. In 2007, WAXN dropped the "Action" moniker and rebranded as "TV64".

WAXN had been Charlotte's home to Southeastern Conference football and basketball games from Jefferson-Pilot/Raycom Sports from the SEC's addition of the University of South Carolina in 1991 until 2009, and SEC games syndicated through ESPN Plus-oriented SEC TV from 2009 to the end of the 2013–14 basketball season. This ended in 2014 due to those games being moved to the new SEC Network that launched on August 14, 2014, as a result of a new contract between the Southeastern Conference and ESPN to launch that new network.

In February 2019, it was announced that Apollo Global Management would acquire Cox Media Group and Northwest Broadcasting's stations. Although the group planned to operate under the name Terrier Media, it was later announced in June 2019 that Apollo would also acquire Cox's radio and advertising businesses, and retain the Cox Media Group name. The sale was completed on December 17, 2019.

During the 2024–25 season, the Charlotte Hornets, FanDuel Sports Network Southeast and Cox Media Group reached an agreement allowing CMG to simulcast five Hornets games on over-the-air stations. In Charlotte, three games will air on WAXN with the other two games on sister station WSOC. WAXN also announced an agreement with Charlotte FC of Major League Soccer to rebroadcast the teams matches. The matches primarily air on Monday nights. WAXN also announced an agreement with the Carolina Ascent of the USL Super League to broadcast matches. In August 2026, following the closure of the FanDuel Sports Networks, WAXN and WSOC would become the full-time home of the Hornets for the 2026–27 season.

== Newscasts ==
WSOC-TV produces 22 hours of locally produced newscasts each week for WAXN-TV (with four hours each weekday and a half-hour each on Saturdays and Sundays). Although WSOC had operated WAXN since the station's inception, it did not produce a newscast for channel 64 until 1999, when it began producing a nightly 10 p.m. newscast. The program launched shortly after WSOC ended a news share agreement with then-Fox affiliate WCCB (channel 18), not long after that station announced plans to take over production responsibilities of its 10 p.m. newscast through the formation of its own news department (the second in that station's history). The prime time newscast on WAXN currently places first in the 10 o'clock timeslot, beating rival news programs airing on CW affiliate WCCB and Fox affiliate WJZY, which are both produced respectively by those stations. The strong lead-ins from rebroadcasts of Dr. Phil and The Dr. Oz Show have been cited as a contributing factor for the program's success.

In October 2008, WAXN began broadcasting the 10 p.m. newscast in high definition, becoming the first prime time news broadcast in the Charlotte market to be televised in HD; WSOC had been producing its own newscasts in HD since it upgraded to the format on April 22, 2007, however the prime time newscast on WAXN was downconverted to standard definition in the stations' shared master control facility for the next year and a half. In September 2010, WAXN added a two-hour-long extension of WSOC's weekday morning newscast, running from 7 to 9 a.m. On December 2, 2013, WSOC expanded the weeknight edition of the WAXN 10 p.m. newscast to one hour, citing the program's high ratings and viewership increases as the reason for the expansion. In January 2020, WAXN debuted an hour-long 7 p.m. newscast.

== Technical information ==
=== Subchannels ===
The station's ATSC 1.0 channels using WAXN-TV's physical channel 32 prior to June 29, 2021, are now carried on the multiplexed signals of three other Charlotte television stations. However, they retain their virtual channel 64 identities.

Subchannels provided by WAXN-TV (ATSC 1.0)
Channel	Res.	Short name	Programming	ATSC 1.0 host
64.1	720p	WAXN	Main WAXN-TV programming	WBTV
64.2	480i	Laff	Laff	WCNC-TV
64.3	480i	Mystery	Ion Mystery	WSOC-TV

On February 14, 2014, WAXN-TV began testing of a new second digital subchannel, which initially displayed color bars. On April 1, 2014, at 4 a.m., WAXN began carrying programming from GetTV on the subchannel. WAXN-TV added a third subchannel carrying Escape (now Ion Mystery) at 12 noon on August 18, 2014. On March 9, 2017, WSOC-TV announced that they would launch Telemundo on its DT2 subchannel effective June 1. WSOC-DT2's former Laff affiliation, which had been in place since April 15, 2015, would be moved to WAXN. On May 31, 2017, Laff was officially added to WAXN's new DT4 subchannel. On May 2, 2022, GetTV switched channels from WAXN-TV to WSOC-TV; subchannel 2 became Laff, while subchannel 4 was removed.

=== Analog-to-digital conversion ===
WAXN-TV shut down its analog signal, over UHF channel 64, on February 17, 2009, the original date on which full-power television stations in the United States were to transition from analog to digital broadcasts under federal mandate. The station's digital signal remained on its pre-transition UHF channel 50, using virtual channel 64.

On May 10, 2009, WAXN installed a larger digital transmitter and increased its effective radiated power from 50 to 91 kilowatts. On July 13, 2011, WAXN saw a further power increase to 150 kW, with the installation of a new directional antenna designed to reduce interference to WFMY-TV in Greensboro.

=== ATSC 3.0 lighthouse service ===
On June 29, 2021, WAXN-TV converted the digital channel 32 to ATSC 3.0, hosting simulcasts from WBTV, WSOC-TV, WCNC-TV and WJZY. Existing ATSC 1.0 channels from WAXN-TV previously on channel 32 are hosted by WBTV, WSOC-TV and WCNC-TV, but retain their virtual channel 64 identities as part of the arrangement.

Subchannels of WAXN-TV (ATSC 3.0)
Channel	Res.	Short name	Programming
3.1	1080p	WBTV	CBS (WBTV)
9.1	1080p	WSOC	ABC (WSOC-TV)
36.1	1080p	WCNC	NBC (WCNC-TV)
46.1	1080p	WJZY	Fox (WJZY)
64.1	1080p	WAXN	Main WAXN-TV programming

Subchannel broadcast with digital rights management
