= WCCB =

Television station in Charlotte, North Carolina

- Charlotte, North Carolina; United States
- Channels: Digital: 18 (UHF); Virtual: 18
- Branding: WCCB Charlotte; WCCB News

Programming
- Affiliations: 18.1: Independent; for others, see § Technical information and subchannels

Ownership
- Owner: Bahakel Communications; (North Carolina Broadcasting Partners)

History
- First air date: First incarnation: January 5, 1954; Second incarnation: September 5, 1961; Current incarnation: November 1, 1964
- Last air date: First incarnation: March 15, 1955; Second incarnation: May 16, 1963
- Former call signs: WAYS-TV (1954–1955); WQMC (1955–1957); WUTV (1957–1964)
- Former channel numbers: Analog: 36 (UHF, 1954–1966), 18 (UHF, 1966–2009); Digital: 27 (UHF, 1999–2019)
- Former affiliations: ABC (1954–1955, 1967–1978); NBC (secondary, 1954–1955 and 1964–1967); Dark (1955–1961, 1963–1964); Independent (1961–1963, 1964–1967, 1978–1986); ABC (secondary, 1964–1967); CBS (secondary, 1964–1967); United (1967); Fox (1986–2013); The CW (2013–2025)
- Call sign meaning: Charlotte Cy Bahakel (station owner and founder)

Technical information
- Licensing authority: FCC
- Facility ID: 49157
- ERP: 963 kW
- HAAT: 364 m (1,194 ft)
- Transmitter coordinates: 35°16′2″N 80°44′4″W
- Translator(s): W34FH-D Marion

Links
- Public license information: Public file; LMS
- Website: www.wccbcharlotte.com

WCCB (channel 18) is an independent television station in Charlotte, North Carolina, United States. It serves as the flagship station of locally based Bahakel Communications. WCCB's studios are located just outside Uptown Charlotte, off Independence Boulevard (across from Bojangles Coliseum), and its transmitter is located in Newell, an unincorporated area of Mecklenburg County just northeast of the Charlotte city limits.

== History ==
=== Beginnings ===
WCCB traces its roots to WAYS-TV, which signed on the air on January 5, 1954, as Charlotte's second television station. It was a primary ABC affiliate with a secondary NBC affiliation. Broadcasting on channel 36, it was North Carolina's second UHF station (after WNAO-TV in Raleigh). It was owned by George Dowdy and his company, Inter-City Advertising, owners of WAYS radio (610 AM, now WPZS); Inter-City had filed for channel 11 prior to the 1948 TV freeze, amended its application to specify channel 9 in 1952, then sought channel 36 instead to avoid a comparative hearing. Hugh Deadwyler became co-owner of the station later that year and acquired the station outright after buying Inter-City's interest in 1955; it sold for $4 and the assumption of liabilities. With the sale, WAYS-TV became WQMC.

Channel 36 had a very weak 132,000-watt signal which was spotty further than 10 miles (16 km) from the transmitter, making it virtually unviewable even in some parts of Mecklenburg County. Even then, like most UHF stations, it was only viewable on most sets with an expensive UHF converter, and picture quality was marginal at best. Television set manufacturers were not required to include UHF tuners at the time; this would not change until Congress passed the All-Channel Receiver Act in 1964. As a result, it made almost no headway against CBS affiliate WBTV (channel 3), which continued to cherry-pick certain NBC programs.

The station went dark on March 15, 1955, in what was intended to be a temporary hiatus while it underwent technical improvements, including the construction of a more powerful transmitter at a new location. However, Deadwyler was unable to get the station back on track. In March 1956, Inter-City Advertising sued to place channel 36 into receivership. Inter-City claimed that Deadwyler had not paid any of the $86,220 debt to Radio Corporation of America that was transferred to him and for which RCA was seeking payment from Inter-City.

=== WUTV ===
Deadwyler organized Century Advertising Co., Inc., which planned to relaunch channel 36 in 1957 as ABC affiliate WUTV, with a more powerful signal than its predecessor. However, these plans were derailed when Charlotte's second VHF station, WSOC-TV (channel 9), signed on the air that April as an NBC affiliate. Even with the stronger signal, WUTV would have still been all but unviewable in most of the market. In addition, most of the market (particularly the western portion) got a fairly decent signal from WLOS-TV out of Asheville; which was included in the Charlotte television listings for many years and even ran ads for its programs in Charlotte area newspapers.

After four years of delays, Century Advertising relaunched WUTV on September 5, 1961. The station broadcast non-commercial educational programming from the University of North Carolina and Charlotte-Mecklenburg Schools, though it retained a commercial license. A full new facility was constructed behind the Charlotte Coliseum at 1 Television Place—still home to WCCB today—including a new transmitter site. WUTV's effective radiated power was 206 kW visual. In the meantime, Century pursued the allocation of VHF channel 6 to Charlotte.

WUTV, however, was not capable of live programming. The Charlotte-Mecklenburg School Board began to pursue the construction of a full educational TV station on reserved channel 42, buying the equipment of a failed station in Fort Pierce, Florida. While channel 36 might have remained on air until the school board was ready to launch WTVI, Century Advertising decided to ask the educational groups to pay rent in early 1963 after having initially verbally agreed to a three-year rent-free contract. They opted to pay to finish out the 1962–1963 school year but no further, causing WUTV to go silent on May 16, 1963.

=== Relaunch ===
In June 1964, businessman Cy Bahakel—who moved from Roanoke, Virginia, to Charlotte—bought the dormant channel 36 license and facilities from Century for $175,000. An addition would be made to the studio building as part of Bahakel's efforts to return the station to the air.

Bahakel returned the station to air on November 1 of that year as WCCB-TV (for "Charlotte Cy Bahakel"). The call letters had recently been used by what is now WNCF in Montgomery, Alabama, which was acquired by Bahakel earlier that year. Logically, it should have returned as a full-time ABC affiliate. Charlotte had only two network-affiliated stations, CBS affiliate WBTV and NBC affiliate WSOC-TV. On paper, Charlotte had been large enough to support three full network affiliates since the 1950s. However, WCCB's signal, like its predecessor, was nowhere near adequate for a market that stretched from the Sandhills in the east to the High Country in the west. Its signal only operated at 200,000 watts, essentially limiting its coverage area to Charlotte proper and its inner suburbs. Additionally, the FCC had only begun requiring television sets to have all-channel tuning a few months before, and most Charlotte households did not yet have UHF-capable sets. Under the circumstances, ABC decided to retain its secondary affiliation agreements with WBTV and WSOC. WCCB was forced to settle for a secondary affiliation with all three networks, airing most of the network shows that WBTV and WSOC chose to turn down. As of March 1965, the nine-county area had 42,887 homes with UHF, with the number increasing by 3,000 per month. Bahakel said this "exceeds our expectation". For the next three years, WCCB split most of NBC and ABC's programming roughly equally with WSOC. It also picked up some CBS shows from WBTV, which still cleared a few ABC shows.

On November 1, 1966, WCCB moved from channel 36 to channel 18, broadcasting from a new tower located on Newell Hickory Grove Road in northeast Charlotte. The new channel 18 facility was capable of 1.35 million watts of power, giving WCCB a coverage area comparable to those of WBTV and WSOC-TV. In 1967, WSOC-TV dropped all ABC programming and became a full-time NBC affiliate, leaving WCCB-TV to be the exclusive ABC affiliate. It took Charlotte 18 years to finally gain full service from all three major networks of the time. The state's largest market thus got a full-fledged ABC affiliate after the state's two smallest markets, Greenville–New Bern–Washington and Wilmington, received ABC affiliates of their own (WCTI-TV and WWAY respectively). However, despite the stronger signal and the first consistent airing of all network programs in Charlotte TV history, WCCB-TV remained a distant third in the ratings.

In 1977, ABC announced that it had lured away WSOC-TV to be its new outlet in the Charlotte market beginning July 1, 1978, replacing WCCB. That decision set off a two-station showdown between WCCB and nine-year-old independent WRET-TV (channel 36, now WCNC-TV) for the NBC affiliation in Charlotte. WCCB was initially seen as the favorite. Unlike WRET, it had a news department. Sources at NBC were said to see channel 36 as their last option, behind WCCB, with its stronger signal, and long-dominant WBTV, which the network was trying to woo from CBS to no avail.

However, WRET owner Ted Turner promised NBC officials that he would spend $2.5 million on station improvements if the network affiliated with channel 36. Of that total, $1 million would go toward starting a news department within one year. The proposed news department would employ 22 people, almost double the size of WCCB's 12-person news operation and the same size as WSOC's 22-person department. On April 29, news broke that WRET-TV had been selected for the NBC affiliation, with the network preferring it to WCCB based on Turner's record of turning around the station and his ownership of the Atlanta Braves and Atlanta Hawks.

With the decision, WCCB became an independent station. It bought a large chunk of syndicated programming from WRET, including cartoons and older sitcoms. For a time in the late 1970s and early 1980s, after-school cartoons (Afternoon Express) were hosted by the costumed Sonic Man space alien character, played by Larry Sprinkle, who has been a staple in Charlotte radio and television, including serving as a weather anchor for channel 36 since the 1980s. WCCB carried on for almost a decade as a typical UHF general entertainment independent station.

=== Fox affiliation ===
Former logo as "Fox 18", used from 1996 to 2002.

In 1986, WCCB became the last station in a top-50 market to join Fox as one of the upstart network's charter affiliates, since it was doing so well in the ratings as an independent. WCCB affiliated with the network when it launched on October 6 of that year. For most of the next quarter-century, WCCB was one of the strongest Fox stations in the country – even claiming to be the highest-rated Fox affiliate in the nation during the 2008–09 television season. The station reaped a major windfall after the NFL moved its National Football Conference television package from CBS to Fox in 1994. By coincidence, this made WCCB the unofficial "home" station of the Carolina Panthers upon the team's 1995 inception. WCCB carried most Panthers regular season games during the team's first 18 seasons, and later acquired the local rights to the team's preseason games from WBTV. Panthers games had generally been the most-watched programs in the market during the NFL football season. After having branded itself as "TV18" since sign-on, WCCB changed its branding to "Fox 18" in 1988 and then to "Fox Charlotte" in 2002.

Former logo as "Fox Charlotte", 3D variant used from 2002 to 2013.

Cy Bahakel was an original partner in the NBA's Charlotte Hornets, and WCCB served as the team's flagship station for the Hornets' first four seasons in Charlotte from 1988 to 1992. Bahakel owned WCCB until his death on April 20, 2006, with his family taking over the duties of running the station (and its parent company, Bahakel Communications) since that point. In 2007, WCCB's website switched to Fox Interactive Media's "MyFox" platform (which was originally intended for Fox's owned-and-operated stations), with the domain transitioning from foxcharlotte.tv to myfoxcharlotte.com; however, the station de-emphasized the "MyFox" corporate reference within a year, with the URL becoming known simply as foxcharlotte.com. The revamped page continued to use the "MyFox" webpage template (sans the "MyFox" branding) until 2010, when Broadcast Interactive Media became WCCB's site host.

=== CW affiliation ===
On January 28, 2013, Fox Television Stations announced the purchase of CW affiliate WJZY (channel 46) and MyNetworkTV affiliate WMYT-TV (channel 55) from Capitol Broadcasting Company for $18 million. While WCCB had been one of the network's strongest affiliates, Fox had been looking to buy a station in what had become the 25th-largest market. It also wanted to own as many stations in NFC markets as possible; at the time Charlotte was the only NFC market in the Eastern Time Zone where the Fox station was only an affiliate. Another likely factor in the purchase was an option by Fox to purchase the Raleigh–Durham CW/MyNetworkTV duopoly of WLFL and WRDC from Sinclair Broadcast Group, which would have resulted in WRAZ (a sister station to WJZY and WMYT at the time) losing its Fox affiliation.

Former logo as "WCCB Charlotte", used from March to June 2013.

On April 18, one day after Fox completed its purchase of WJZY and WMYT, WCCB announced that it would replace WJZY as Charlotte's CW affiliate on July 1. On May 9, it was reported that Bahakel reserved the domain CharlottesCW.com for two years. Given the station's strong performance as a Fox affiliate and its half-century of service to the area (in its current incarnation), WCCB was expected to become one of the ten strongest CW affiliates in the nation when it formally joined that network. The old "Fox Charlotte" logo remained at the entrance to the station's studios until mid-May when it was replaced with signage bearing the "Charlotte CW" logo.

Former logo as "WCCB Charlotte CW", used from 2024 to 2025

WCCB's relationship with Fox formally ended after 27 years on June 30. With the loss of WCCB's Fox affiliation, WCCB formally rolled out its new on-air branding and logo the next afternoon, July 1, 2013, its first day as a CW affiliate. However, most verbal references to the station were to its call letters, with any CW references used obliquely (in the manner of "WCCB, Charlotte's CW"). It marked the first time in a quarter-century that the station used its call letters on a permanent basis in its branding.

=== Return to independence ===
In 2025, Nexstar Media Group announced in an earnings release that WMYT would become an owned-and-operated station of The CW on September 1. As a result, WCCB would lose its CW affiliation and become an independent station for the first time since 1986, when it affiliated with the Fox network.

== Programming ==
WCCB was one of the few stations broadcasting Siskel & Ebert that was affiliated with Fox, with others including WLFL, Fox's Raleigh–Durham affiliate from 1986 to 1998, and Fox's New York City flagship station WNYW.

WCCB remained home to Panthers preseason football games until losing them to WSOC-TV for the 2019 season. It also began airing Charlotte 49ers college football games in September 2013, with WCCB carrying any 49er home games not carried by Conference USA's national and regional television partners; these games have since moved to ESPN+ after the 49ers joined the American Conference for all sports. After going independent in 2025, WCCB increased live local sports coverage under the Bahakel Sports banner, including a top high school football game each week and a package of Charlotte Checkers hockey games.

=== News operation ===
WCCB aired newscasts at various times between 1964 until its ABC disaffiliation in 1978. It reduced its news department to a skeleton staff after becoming an independent station and did not carry a regularly scheduled newscast again until 1994, when it began airing a nightly 10 p.m. news program produced by WSOC-TV. In 1999, WCCB announced plans to launch its own news department. That summer, WSOC-TV relocated its prime time newscast to its sister independent station WAXN-TV (channel 64). WCNC then temporarily took over production of the late-evening newscast on WCCB until the launch of the station's in-house news department on January 1, 2000, with the debut of a half-hour 10 p.m. newscast. Ironically, the WCNC-produced newscast on WCCB drew a larger audience at the time than the newscasts that actually aired on WCNC.

On September 28, 2008, beginning with the 10 p.m. newscast, WCCB became the second television station in the Charlotte market to begin broadcasting its local newscasts in high definition. The upgrade included the debut of a brand new HD-ready news set. On February 4, 2013, Ken White, who had served as WCCB's news director since the 2000 inception of its current news department, was reassigned to sister station WBBJ-TV in Jackson, Tennessee, as its interim news director; assistant news director Angela Robbins was appointed as White's replacement at WCCB.

After WCCB became a CW affiliate on July 1, 2013, it retained its weekday morning and nightly prime time newscasts. On November 9, 2013, WCCB debuted half-hour 6 p.m. newscasts on Saturday and Sunday evenings, making it one of the few television stations to have carried an early evening newscast on weekends without an existing newscast in that daypart on weekdays.

== Technical information and subchannels ==
WCCB's transmitter is located in Newell, an unincorporated area of Mecklenburg County just northeast of the Charlotte city limits. The station's signal is multiplexed:

Subchannels of WCCB
Subchannel	Res.	Short name	Programming
18.1	720p	WCCB-DT	Main WCCB programming
18.2	480i	WCCB-ST	Start TV
18.3	480i	WCCB-ME	MeTV
18.4	480i	QVC-TV	QVC
18.5	480i	WCCB-HI	Heroes & Icons
18.6	480i	WCCB-DB	Dabl
18.7	480i	HSN-TV	HSN
18.8	480i	WCCB-CZ	Cozi TV
18.9	480i	MeToons	MeTV Toons
18.10	480i	NwsMax2	Newsmax2

Previously, a standard-definition simulcast of the station's main channel was carried on its second digital subchannel; this simulcast feed was later upgraded to high-definition with the addition of SAP and DVS audio channels. In June 2012, the SAP/DVS feed was added to the main channel as well. The second subchannel was removed in December 2013, as well as the SAP/DVS feed from the main channel which was unused at that time by The CW (it later returned due to FCC description and weather warning read-out requirements, along with it being utilized by The CW for One Magnificent Morning and a Spanish dub of Jane the Virgin); digital subchannel 18.2 would return in April 2014 carrying QVC's "Over the Air" simulcast service. On July 21, 2014, it was announced that Antenna TV would be added to the second subchannel on August 15, 2014, bringing it back to the Charlotte market after being dropped by its previous affiliate WJZY. Antenna TV began airing that day, replacing QVC Over the Air, which went to a new fourth digital subchannel. On August 29, 2019, the Home Shopping Network was added on 18.7; this was followed by Dabl, which premiered on September 9 on 18.6. On January 8, 2020, Cozi TV was added to 18.8. On October 27, 2020, Antenna TV (18.2) and Start TV (18.5) swapped subchannels.

Until March 1, 2011, WCCB carried a feed of its weather radar on its third subchannel, which provided NOAA Weather Radio feeds from Spencer Mountain, North Carolina, and Columbia and Rock Hill, South Carolina, through SAP. On that date, MeTV replaced the weather radar feed after having the start date of its affiliation delayed for a month due to contractual issues. The weather radar feed remained available through WCCB's mobile DTV service, but this has since been discontinued. The Spencer Mountain and Rock Hill NOAA feeds were initially retained on MeTV through SAP. The Spencer Mountain feed was removed in mid-2012, and the Rock Hill feed was removed in December 2013.

=== Translator ===
- W34FH-D Marion

=== Analog-to-digital conversion ===
WCCB shut down its analog signal, over UHF channel 18, on June 12, 2009, the official date on which full-power television stations in the United States transitioned from analog to digital broadcasts under federal mandate. The station's digital signal remained on its pre-transition UHF channel 27, using virtual channel 18. On February 4, 2010, WCCB signed on a translator located near Connelly Springs on UHF channel 20, W20DD-D. The translator was licensed to Marion as W08BJ. It was purchased from WSPA-TV and moved to Smith Mountain.

== Out-of-market cable carriage ==
In recent years, WCCB has been carried on cable in several areas outside the Charlotte television market, including on cable systems within the Asheville and Greensboro–Winston-Salem–High Point markets, the Columbia market in South Carolina, and the Tri-Cities market in Tennessee and Virginia.
