= Central Piedmont Community College =

Public college in Charlotte, North Carolina, U.S.

- Other names: Central Piedmont, CPCC, CP
- Type: Public community college
- Established: 1963; 63 years ago
- Parent institution: North Carolina Community College System
- Academic affiliations: Southern Association of Colleges and Schools
- Endowment: $68.6 million (2025)
- President: Kandi Deitemeyer
- Students: 42,955 (2020–21)
- Location: Charlotte, North Carolina, United States
- Campus: Urban
- Colors: Gray and gold
- Sporting affiliations: Previously NJCAA
- Mascot: Tigers
- Website: www.cpcc.edu

Central Piedmont Community College (Central Piedmont) is a public community college in Charlotte, North Carolina. With an enrollment of more than 40,000 students annually, Central Piedmont is the second-largest community college in the North Carolina Community College System and the largest in the Charlotte metropolitan area. The college has six campuses and three centers and offers nearly 300 degree, diploma and certificate programs.

The college was founded in 1963, the year the North Carolina General Assembly passed the state community college bill. It is the result of a merger between Mecklenburg College and the Central Industrial Education Center.

== History ==
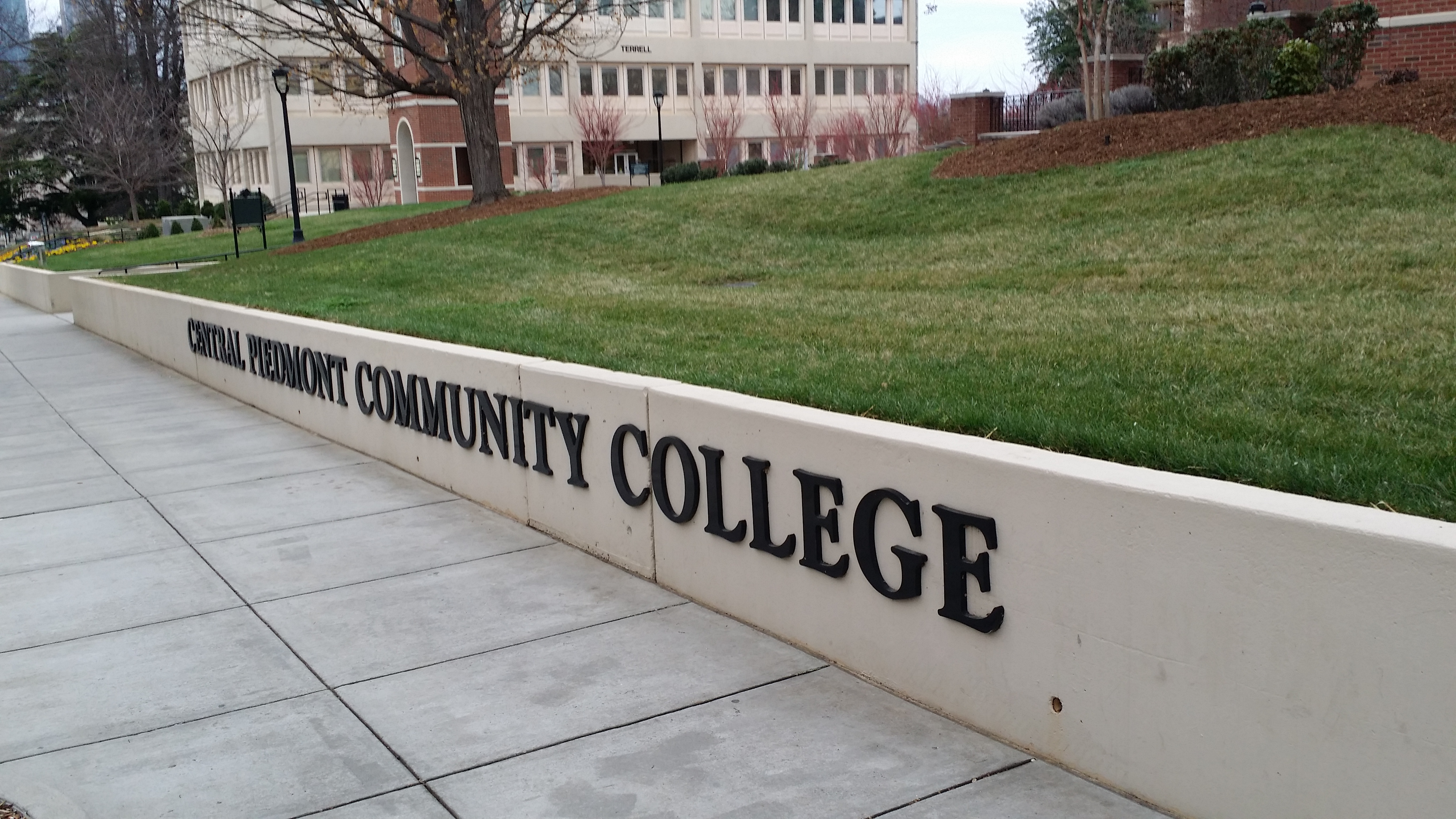
CPCC Central Campus

From 1923 to 1959, Central High School was located on Elizabeth Avenue at Kings Drive, where Central Piedmont Community College is now located. In 1959, its students moved into the new Garinger High School. With the building vacant, Charlotte College (later University of North Carolina at Charlotte, UNCC) used the space. Starting in 1959, the Central Industrial Education Center shared the old high school. As a result of the 1963 N.C. Community College Act, the Central Industrial Education Center and the black Mecklenburg College combined to become Central Piedmont Community College. The three-story Central High building is now the oldest building on the CPCC campus. CPCC trustees in July 2002 approved changing the building's name from Garinger Hall to the Central High School building, and a fund-raising campaign for the building's renovation was planned. The Central High School Legacy Fund funded renovation of the Central High building, used for administrative offices and admissions, and provided scholarship money. A rededication took place September 30, 2007, after restoration of the original facade.

WTVI, Charlotte's PBS affiliate now run by Central Piedmont Community College, was to become a laboratory for the college's new associate degree program launching in August 2015 in broadcasting and production technology.

== Campuses ==
=== Central Campus ===
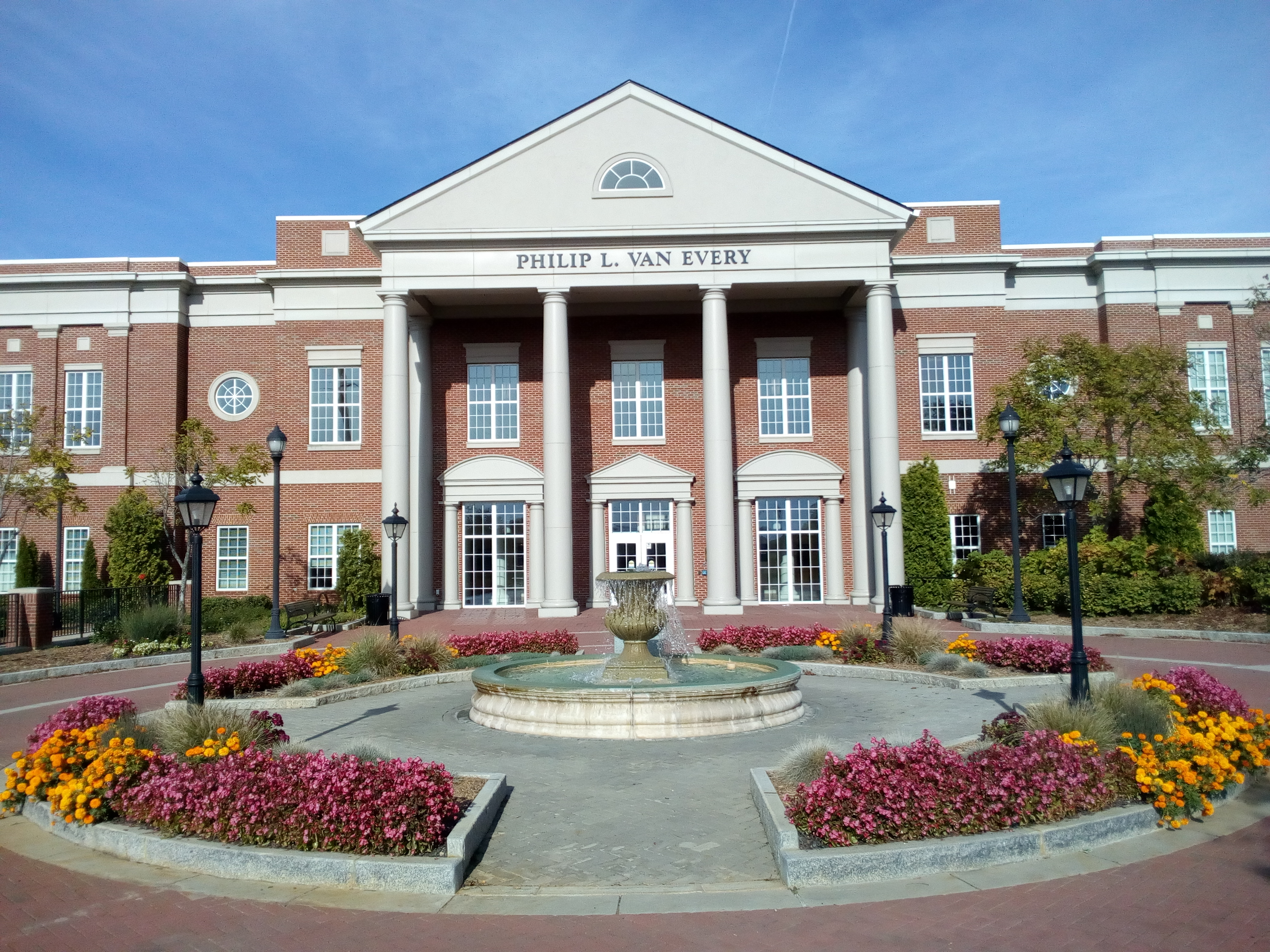
The Van Every Building at CPCC's Central Campus

Central Campus is in the Elizabeth neighborhood (adjacent to Independence Park and the Little Sugar Creek Greenway). The campus is set up more like a traditional university campus, housing many buildings on many different blocks. Currently, certain buildings on campus are being expanded and renovated, while others are being replaced all together.

The campus is serviced by the CityLynx Gold Line streetcar, with a designated station (CPCC station).

=== Cato Campus ===
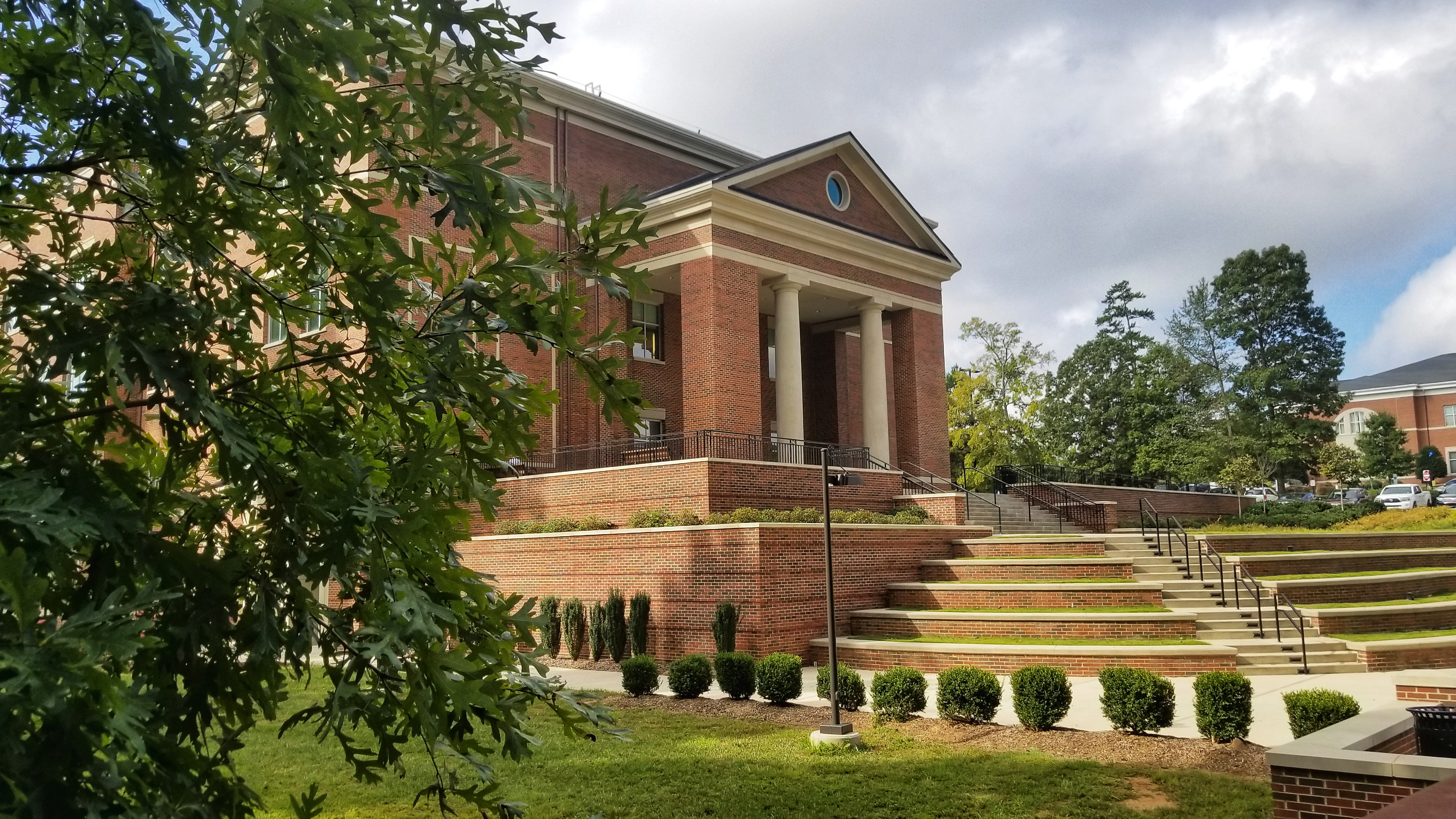
Cato campus, building III

Originally named "Northeast Campus", it is located near Reedy Creek Nature Reserve and was opened in the summer of 2002 with two buildings totaling 50,000 sq ft (4,600 m^{2}). Built to relieve overcrowding at Central Campus, this location's focus area is horticulture due to its hilly and shady terrain, close proximity to local parks, and ease of access to the rest of the county. It is also located in the University City section of Charlotte, the campus is only 3 miles from UNCC, providing close proximity for students of both institutions to take classes at either campus.

In the summer of 2005, the campus was renamed after Wayland H. Cato, a retailer who donates to the college. The campus also expanded and has since added another building, but the main focus of the Cato Campus is still horticulture and turf management.

=== Harper Campus ===
Opened in winter of 1998 as the Southwest Campus, this satellite campus is located on Hebron St. off of Nations Ford Rd. in southwest Charlotte. The campus focuses on construction technologies, welding, HVAC systems, graphic design and arts, and general studies.

=== Levine Campus ===
Opened as the 'South Campus' in the fall of 1998, this satellite campus is located in southeast Mecklenburg County, in Matthews, North Carolina. The campus opened with a 116,000 sq ft (10,800 m^{2}) building on a 32 acres, aimed at relieving the overcrowding at the Central Campus. The campus features a book store, computer lab and a food court in a three-story building. The campus was renamed and increased to 220,000 sq ft (20,000 m^{2}) with the aim to make the new Levine Campus into a full-fledged college campus. In late 2005 the Levine Campus grew again, when NASCAR owner Rick Hendrick donated money to build the $4 million, 25,000 sq ft (2,300 m^{2}) facility, 'Joe Hendrick Center for Automotive Technology'.

With the construction of I-485 nearby, the college has expanded the role for the campus, particularly for computer and information technology, as the Levine Campus houses the largest enrollment of this kind of all Central Piedmont campuses.

=== Merancas Campus ===
The first of Central Piedmont's satellite campuses, it was opened in 1990 as the North Center, eventually growing with the addition of the Public Safety building in 1996 and being renamed the North Campus. The campus is located north of Charlotte, in Huntersville, North Carolina. This campus is home to the college's Public Safety and Transportation Systems programs. In 2011 the college renamed the campus to the Merancas Campus, after longtime donors Casey and Anke Mermans and their Merancas Foundation.

=== Harris Campus ===
Harris Campus opened in the West Charlotte area in 2001. It is located next to the Charlotte-Douglas International Airport. The campus houses meeting and convention spaces.

=== Online Learning ===
Central Piedmont is accredited by the Southern Association of Colleges and Schools and offers online courses (full, partial, and hybrid) to meet the needs of students.

== Notable alumni ==
- Calvin Brock, Olympian
- Ken McCool, member-elect of the North Carolina House of Representatives from the 105th district
- Jay Thomas, actor, comedian, and radio talk-show host
- Anne Tompkins, former United States attorney for the United States District Court for the Western District of North Carolina
- John H. White, photojournalist, 1982 Pulitzer Prize for Feature Photography recipient
