= Chuck Goudie =

American journalist (born 1956)

Chuck Goudie (born January 17, 1956, in Detroit, Michigan) is an American television journalist based in Chicago. He has been the investigative reporter of NBC owned NBC-5, in Chicago since February 10, 2025. He was with ABC7 from April 1980 until December 2024.

== Social media ==
Goudie is a frequent provider of news stories and investigations via a Twitter page at https://twitter.com/ChuckGoudieNBC

== Major stories ==
Goudie has reported stories from around the world, and was the first Chicago reporter on the air from New York's "Ground Zero" following the 9/11 attack.

In 1998, Goudie and his team broke the "Licenses-for-Bribes" investigation which revealed that Illinois commercial drivers' licenses were being sold to hundreds of unqualified truckers. The TV investigation motivated the FBI to send agents undercover in Illinois Secretary of State facilities and led to dozens of federal corruption indictments. The Justice Department's “Operation: Safe Roads” led all the way to former Governor George Ryan.

The 2004 “Changing of the Guard” investigation documented misconduct, accidents and negligence by top members of the Illinois State Police unit that guarded Illinois Governor Rod Blagojevich. It resulted in the governor ordering a thorough state police overhaul.

In 1993, Goudie's investigation of sexual abuse allegations against the late Cardinal Joseph Bernardin resulted in the cardinal's accuser withdrawing charges.

== Major awards ==
Goudie has received a National Emmy Award for Investigative Reporting. Goudie's series “Worst Case Scenario” exposed how government agencies and chemical companies were unprotected against an attack. The reports found significant gaps in security at Illinois chemical plants; significant because there are more chemical facilities containing large amounts of hazardous chemicals in Illinois than any state in the USA.

The national "Edward R. Murrow Award" from the Radio-Television News Directors Association, for continuing coverage a nationwide murder spree.

Numerous Associated Press journalism awards including a national AP award for enterprise reporting.

== Personal history ==
At age 12, Goudie was a regular on two weekly children's shows on WXYZ-TV in Detroit, Michigan. (1968–72). From 1975 to 1976, he was the news director at the Michigan State Network, the campus radio network serving Michigan State University in East Lansing, Michigan. He worked full-time as a radio newsman for both WILS-Radio and WVIC-Radio in Lansing and was a contributor to WXYZ-Radio in Detroit.

Goudie also worked at WSOC-TV, the ABC affiliate in Charlotte, N.C., where he was a main sports anchor (1978–80) and general assignment reporter (1977–78).

He is a member of Investigative Reporters and Editors (IRE) and a regular speaker at their annual international conference.

Goudie holds a degree from Michigan State University where he was a member of Delta Chi fraternity. In 1982 he married Teri Goudie, a former ABC producer who now leads a media consulting and corporate crisis training company. They have five children. Brittany Goudie, one of Chuck and Teri's children, started her career at HARPO Studios in Chicago working on The Oprah Winfrey Show, music management at Nashville-based Starstruck Entertainment, and now as producer of SiriusXM The Highway morning show with Storme Warren.
