= Walter Edgar =

American historian and author (born 1943)

Walter B. Edgar
- Born: December 10, 1943 (age 82); Mobile, Alabama, United States
- Education: B.A. Davidson College, 1965; M.A.South Carolina, 1966; Ph.D South Carolina, 1969
- Occupations: Historian, writer
- Writing career
- Period: Professor: 1972–2012
- Genre: Southern history
- Subject: South Carolina
- Notable works: South Carolina: A History; The South Carolina Encyclopedia
- Website: southcarolinapublicradio.org/programs/walter-edgars-journal

Walter B. Edgar (born December 10, 1943) is an American historian and author specializing in Southern history and culture, particularly for South Carolina. Edgar has authored or edited several books about the state, including South Carolina: A History and The South Carolina Encyclopedia. He is known for hosting the popular weekly radio show Walter Edgar's Journal on South Carolina Public Radio on historic and cultural topics, as well as the daily feature South Carolina A to Z on South Carolina Public Radio.

Edgar was born in 1943 in Mobile, Alabama, and was raised there. Edgar went to Davidson College in North Carolina for undergraduate studies, receiving a B.A. in history. Edgar elected to continue history studies at the University of South Carolina, graduating with both a masters and doctorate degree. Following active duty in the U.S. Army including a tour in Vietnam, Edgar returned to USC as a professor in 1972 while remaining in the Army Reserve, from which he retired as a colonel. He retired from USC after 40 years of teaching and research in 2012. Edgar was married to his first wife Betty in 1966. She died in 2005 following health complications. Edgar remarried in 2007 to his current wife Nela; they live in Columbia, South Carolina.

== Works ==
- History of Santee Cooper, 1934–1984. Columbia, South Carolina: R.L. Bryan Company. 1984. ISBN 978-0-934870-10-8.
- Columbia: Portrait of a City. Norfolk, Virginia: Donning Company. 1986. ISBN 978-0-89865-495-0., a pictorial volume
- new introduction and two new appendices by Walter B. Edgar in South Carolina: The WPA Guide to the Palmetto State. Columbia, South Carolina: University of South Carolina Press. 1988. ISBN 978-0-87249-603-3. originally published 1941
- South Carolina in the Modern Age. Columbia, South Carolina: University of South Carolina Press. 1992. ISBN 978-0-87249-831-0.
- South Carolina: A History. Columbia, South Carolina: University of South Carolina Press. 1998. ISBN 978-1-57003-255-4.
- Partisans and Redcoats: The Southern Conflict That Turned the Tide of the American Revolution. New York: William Morrow. 2001. ISBN 978-0-380-80643-0.
- The South Carolina Encyclopedia. Columbia, South Carolina: University of South Carolina Press. 2006. ISBN 978-1-57003-598-2.
