= Robinson Rock House Ruin and Plantation Site =

- U.S. National Register of Historic Places
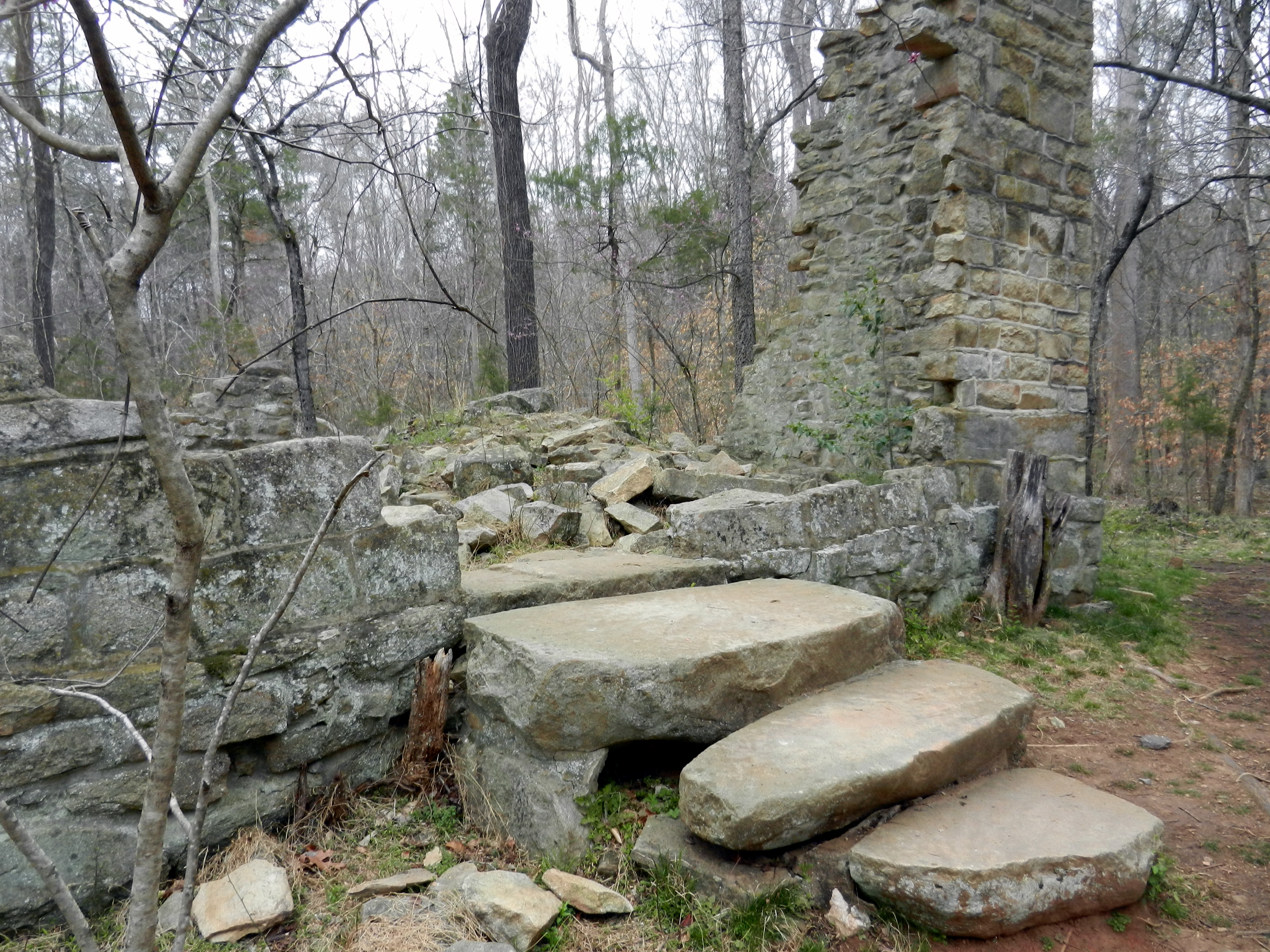

- Location within North Carolina Location within the United States
- Location: Reedy Creek Park-2900 Rocky River Rd., Charlotte, North Carolina
- Coordinates: 35°15′41″N 80°42′27″W
- Area: 80 acres (32 ha)
- Built: c. 1780-1810
- Architectural style: Colonial
- NRHP reference No.: 08001365
- Added to NRHP: January 22, 2009

Robinson Rock House Ruin and Plantation Site, also known as Site 31MK272, is a historic archaeological site located in Reedy Creek Park at Charlotte, Mecklenburg County, North Carolina. It is the remnants of an 18th-century stone dwelling of the Colonial period. The Robinson Stone House was probably built between 1780 and 1810. In September, 1979, the site was acquired by the City of Charlotte to be incorporated into a new park and nature preserve.

It was added to the National Register of Historic Places in 2009.
