= South Carolina Public Radio =

Public radio network in South Carolina, United States

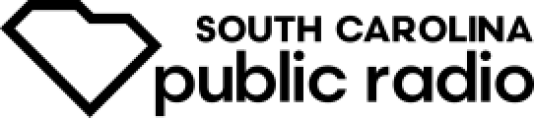
- Country: United States
- Headquarters: Columbia, South Carolina

Programming
- Affiliations: National Public Radio, American Public Media

Ownership
- Owner: South Carolina Educational Television Commission
- Sister stations: South Carolina ETV

History
- Launch date: 1972

Coverage
- Availability: South Carolina, South-Central North Carolina, Eastern Georgia

Links
- Website: www.southcarolinapublicradio.org

South Carolina Public Radio (SCPR) is the National Public Radio member network serving the state of South Carolina. It is licensed to the South Carolina Educational Television Commission, an agency of South Carolina state government. It is a sister network to South Carolina Educational Television.

The radio network's primary operations and Public Information Files are located at the SCETV Telecommunications Center on the campus of the University of South Carolina on George Rogers Boulevard across from Williams-Brice Stadium in Columbia.

The network's 8 transmitters at 100 kW (5) and 30 kW (3) provide at least secondary coverage to nearly all of South Carolina, with portions of North Carolina and Georgia.

== History ==
The S.C. Educational Television Commission had its mission broadened to include FM radio in the late 1960s. In 1972, WEPR in Clemson (now in Greenville) signed on the air as the state's first public radio station. 7 more transmitters signed on in the 1970s and 1980s.

Until 2001, the stations were known as the South Carolina Educational Radio Network (SCERN), airing a mix of classical music, NPR news and locally produced programs. However, since much of the state receives grade B coverage from at least two transmitters, ETV management opted to split transmitters into two programming networks. Four stations continued to air a mix of classical music and NPR programming, while three aired an expanded schedule of NPR news and talk. The 8th station, WNSC-FM in Rock Hill, began airing exclusively jazz music in order to avoid programming duplication with WFAE and WDAV in Charlotte.

In 2003, SCERN rebranded as "ETV Radio" in order to link the radio stations more closely with public awareness of South Carolina ETV.

In 2009, ETV Radio began streaming online the Classical and News networks.

In 2011, listeners gave $1.5 million in donations toward the construction of a new studio facility, which opened in April 2013.

In 2015, ETV Radio rebranded as South Carolina Public Radio.

== Network ==
South Carolina Public Radio consists of 8 FM transmitters. Three broadcast a mix of both NPR news and classical music; 5 broadcast NPR news and information programming. All stations simulcast NPR's Morning Edition and All Things Considered along with distinctive local programming.

=== News/classical service ===
| Call sign | Frequency | City of license | FID | ERP (W) | HAAT | Class | Transmitter coordinates | FCC info |
|---|---|---|---|---|---|---|---|---|
| WEPR | 90.1 FM | Greenville, South Carolina | 60926 | 83,000 | 367 m (1,204 ft) | C | 34°56′29.00″N 82°24′38.00″W | LMS |
| WLTR | 91.3 FM | Columbia, South Carolina | 60984 | 98,000 (100,000 with beam tilt) | 232 m (761 ft) | C1 | 34°7′7.5″N 80°56′11.3″W | LMS |
| WSCI | 89.3 FM | Charleston, South Carolina | 60950 | 97,000 (100,000 with beam tilt) | 418 m (1,371 ft) | C | 32°55′28.6″N 79°41′57.3″W | LMS |

=== News/talk service ===
| Call sign | Frequency | City of license | FID | ERP (W) | HAAT | Class | Transmitter coordinates | FCC info |
|---|---|---|---|---|---|---|---|---|
| WHMC-FM | 90.1 FM | Conway, South Carolina | 60998 | 30,000 | 215 m (705 ft) | C1 | 33°57′5.00″N 79°6′31.00″W | LMS |
| WJWJ-FM | 89.9 FM | Beaufort, South Carolina | 61006 | 48,000 | 334 m (1,096 ft) | C1 | 32°42′42″N 80°40′54″W | LMS |
| WLJK | 89.1 FM | Aiken, South Carolina | 60960 | 10,000 | 419 m (1,375 ft) | C1 | 33°24′18″N 81°50′13″W | LMS |
| WNSC-FM | 88.9 FM | Rock Hill, South Carolina | 60962 | 97,900 (100,000 with beam tilt) | 183 m (600 ft) | C1 | 34°50′24″N 81°01′05″W | LMS |
| WRJA-FM | 88.1 FM | Sumter, South Carolina | 60974 | 98,000 (100,000 with beam tilt) | 305 m (1,001 ft) | C | 33°52′52″N 80°16′12″W | LMS |
| WSCI-HD2 | (89.3-2) FM | Charleston, South Carolina | 60950 | 3,980 (digital) | 418 m (1,371 ft) | C | 32°55′28.6″N 79°41′57.3″W | LMS |

South Carolina Public Radio programming split into a 2-channel network in 2001 to provide more public radio choices to state listeners. WJWJ-FM was the first to split off later that year. Nearly all of its coverage area also receives classical music programming from WSVH in Savannah, and it offers at least grade B coverage to most of the Charleston area. WRJA-FM came next later in 2001 since much of its coverage area overlaps WLTR. WHMC-FM followed in late 2001, with WLJK joining in 2003.

On July 1, 2008, WNSC-FM joined the NPR News radio service. Then-SCETV president Moss Bresnahan told the Charlotte Observer that SCETV did not want to deny listeners on the South Carolina side of the Charlotte market access to SCETV's growing slate of local programming. The move left the Charlotte market without a jazz station of its own. WNSC-FM was the Charlotte area's first NPR station when it signed on in 1979 as WFAE did not sign on until 1981. Presently, the only area of the state that does not receive grade B overlap coverage from two NPR stations is WEPR's coverage area in the Upstate. Recently, ETV Radio added a simulcast of its all-news format on WSCI's second HD subcarrier in order to improve reception for that format in Charleston.

All stations are fed programming directly from Columbia, although ETV/South Carolina Public Radio maintains several local offices.

=== State-produced programming ===
- Chamber Music from Spoleto USA
- Marian McPartland's Piano Jazz
- Piano Jazz Rising Stars
- Song Travels with Michael Feinstein
- Walter Edgar's Journal
- Your Day (produced by Clemson University Radio Productions)
- Standard Time
- Roots Music Karamu
- On The Keys with David Kiser
- Sonatas and Soundscapes
