= WSOC-TV =

Television station in Charlotte, North Carolina

- Charlotte, North Carolina; United States
- Channels: Digital: 19 (UHF); Virtual: 9
- Branding: Channel 9; Channel 9 Eyewitness News; Telemundo Charlotte (9.2)

Programming
- Affiliations: 9.1: ABC; 9.2: Telemundo; for others, see § Subchannels

Ownership
- Owner: Cox Media Group; (WSOC Television, LLC)
- Sister stations: WAXN-TV

History
- First air date: April 28, 1957
- Former channel numbers: Analog: 9 (VHF, 1957–2009); Digital: 34 (UHF, 1999–2019)
- Former affiliations: NBC (1957–1978)
- Call sign meaning: "We Serve Our Community"; -or-; "Sounds of Charlotte"; (both from WSOC radio)

Technical information
- Licensing authority: FCC
- Facility ID: 74070
- ERP: 1,000 kW
- HAAT: 356 m (1,168 ft)
- Transmitter coordinates: 35°15′41.1″N 80°43′36.5″W
- Translator(s): see § Translators

Links
- Public license information: Public file; LMS
- Website: www.wsoctv.com

WSOC-TV (channel 9) is a television station in Charlotte, North Carolina, United States, affiliated with ABC and Telemundo. It is owned by Cox Media Group alongside Kannapolis-licensed WAXN-TV (channel 64), an independent station. The two outlets share studios on West 23rd Street north of uptown Charlotte; WSOC-TV's transmitter is located near Reedy Creek Park in the Newell section of the city.

== History ==
The station first signed on the air on April 28, 1957, as the third television station in Charlotte, North Carolina, after WBTV (channel 3) and WAYS-TV (channel 36, later WQMC-TV); it was also Charlotte's second station on the VHF band. It operated from a temporary facility on Plaza Road Extension in what was then a rural portion of eastern Mecklenburg County.

WSOC was originally locally owned by Carolina Broadcasting, operated by the Jones family, along with WSOC (1240 AM) and WSOC-FM 103.7. WSOC was the second radio station to sign on in Charlotte, having made its debut in 1929, seven years after the debut of WBT (1110 AM). Channel 9 originally operated as a primary NBC affiliate (owing to WSOC radio's affiliation with the NBC Radio Network), and maintained a secondary affiliation with ABC, sharing the network with WBTV. In 1959, Carolina Broadcasting merged with the Miami Valley Broadcasting Company, forerunner of Cox Enterprises. That same year, it dedicated its studios on North Tryon Street.

Jimmy Kilgo hosted Kilgo's Kanteen, a show for teens similar to American Bandstand, from 1957 to 1970 on WSOC. The show aired on other stations as well. Clown Carnival, a children's program hosted by Brooks Lindsay as Joey the Clown, ran from 1959 to 1970.

Channel 36 went off the air in 1955. It operated as educational WUTV from 1961 to 1963, then returned to the air in November 1964 as WCCB. WCCB moved to the stronger UHF channel 18 allocation in November 1966, but it continued to be at a competitive disadvantage because many Charlotte-area households did not yet have television sets with UHF tuning capability. As a result, ABC retained a secondary affiliation with WSOC and WBTV, while WCCB aired programs from all three networks (ABC, NBC and CBS) that WSOC and WBTV declined to air. In 1967, WSOC became an exclusive NBC affiliate, while WCCB became a full-time ABC affiliate.

By 1978, ABC had become the highest-rated broadcast television network in the United States for the first time; the network wanted a stronger affiliate in Charlotte than WCCB. WSOC switched its affiliation back to ABC on July 1, 1978, this time as a full-time affiliate. NBC programming was moved over to former independent station WRET (channel 36, now WCNC-TV), due to a promise by then-owner Ted Turner to make $2.5 million in upgrades to that station, including the planned launch of a news department and a more powerful transmitter. WCCB became an independent station by default, remaining so for the next nine years until it affiliated with Fox when that network launched in October 1986. The radio stations–WSOC (930 AM) and WSOC-FM–were sold off in the early 1990s.

By the mid-1990s, WSOC-TV had a problem. It owned the rights to a large amount of syndicated programming, but increased local news commitments left it without enough time in its broadcast day to air it all. In 1996, it found a solution in the form of a joint sales agreement (JSA) with independent station WKAY-TV (channel 64). As part of the deal, WKAY moved its operations to WSOC-TV's studios and changed its call letters to WAXN-TV. Under the JSA, channel 9 bought WAXN's entire broadcast day, using it to air much of channel 9's surplus inventory of syndicated programming. One of those programs was The Andy Griffith Show; it had been a mainstay on channel 9 for decades on weekday afternoons at 5 p.m. before being bumped in favor of a 5 p.m. newscast. Cox purchased WAXN outright for $3 million in 1999, shortly after the Federal Communications Commission (FCC) reversed its long-standing ban on television station duopolies; the sale was officially approved by the FCC in 2000. WSOC-TV served as the Charlotte "Love Network" affiliate of the Jerry Lewis MDA Labor Day Telethon from 1975 to 2001; the program moved to WAXN thereafter, before returning to WSOC in 2013 (by this point, known as the MDA Show of Strength) after the program abandoned its syndicated long-form telethon format and became a shortened two-hour network telecast on ABC; the telecast was discontinued after 2014.

On December 21, 2010, a distraught 51-year-old woman armed with a gun entered the WSOC-TV studios, forcing the station to temporarily go off the air just after the start of that evening's 5 p.m. newscast. After a one-hour standoff, the woman was taken into custody; it was later determined that the gun was not loaded. No injuries were reported in the incident.

In February 2019, it was announced that Apollo Global Management would acquire Cox Media Group and Northwest Broadcasting's stations. Although the group planned to operate under the name Terrier Media, it was later announced in June 2019 that Apollo would also acquire Cox's radio and advertising businesses, and retain the Cox Media Group name. The sale was completed on December 17, 2019.

During the 2024–25 season, the Charlotte Hornets, FanDuel Sports Network Southeast and Cox Media Group reached an agreement allowing CMG to simulcast five Hornets games on over-the-air stations. In Charlotte, two games will air on WSOC with the other three games on sister station WAXN. In August 2026, following the closure of the FanDuel Sports Networks, WSOC and WAXN would become the full-time home of the Hornets for the 2026–27 season.

== News operation ==
WSOC-TV presently broadcasts 37 1/2 hours of locally produced newscasts each week (with 5 1/2 hours each weekday and five hours each on Saturdays and Sundays); in addition, the station produces an additional 17 hours of newscasts each week for sister station WAXN-TV (in the form of a two-hour extension of WSOC's weekday morning newscast and an hour-long 10 p.m. newscast).

Since the early 1970s, WSOC-TV has used the Eyewitness News brand for its newscasts. However, its overall news presentation is very similar to the Action News format at Atlanta sister station WSB-TV. When channel 9 expanded its 6 p.m. newscast to a full hour, it began airing ABC World News Tonight at 7 p.m. This ended in 1993, when the addition of a newscast at 5:30 p.m. led the station to cut back the 6 p.m. newscast to a half hour and World News Tonight moved back to 6:30.

For most of its first quarter-century on the air, WSOC's newscasts placed a very distant second in the Charlotte market, behind the longer-established WBTV. However, in 1981, the station scored a major coup when longtime WBTV anchorman Doug Mayes moved to WSOC as its noon anchor, where he stayed until his retirement in 1992. Mayes said years later that WSOC made an offer too generous for him to turn down, considering that he had two kids in college at the time. The move quickly paid off; in 1982, it overtook WBTV for the lead at 11 p.m., a lead it held for almost 25 years. It surpassed WBTV in most other timeslots beginning in 1990, but lost the lead in the noon time period to WBTV in 1994.

Channel 9's two-decade dominance of the early evening news timeslots largely stemmed from the former presence of Oprah as a lead-in to the 5 p.m. newscast; the syndicated talk show aired on channel 9 throughout its national run from 1986 to 2011. During the February 2011 ratings period, the station's newscasts won in every time slot except noon and 11 p.m., which were won by WBTV. WSOC-TV lost the lead at noon as well in the February 2013 sweeps period.

By the February 2016 sweeps, however, the departure of a number of key reporters in 2015 resulted in WSOC-TV falling to second place in all timeslots. However, it maintained its historic dominance east of the Catawba River. WSOC-TV would regain the market lead by 2023, where the station leads in three key timeslots.

Since 2000, WSOC-TV has produced a 10 p.m. newscast for sister station WAXN-TV. The program originated on then-Fox affiliate WCCB through a news share agreement established with that station in 1999, until the summer of 1999, when WCNC took over production of the prime time newscast shortly before WCCB launched its own news department in January 2000. During the February 2011 ratings period, WSOC's 10 p.m. newscast on WAXN placed second behind WCCB's in-house newscast; it also placed ahead of the WBTV-produced newscast on then-CW affiliate WJZY (channel 46, now a Fox affiliate), as well as the 11 p.m. newscast on WCNC. Bill Walker served as WSOC's main anchor from 1971 until his retirement in 2005, the longest tenure of any news anchor in Charlotte television history.

On April 22, 2007, WSOC-TV became the first television station in the Charlotte market and the second station in North Carolina overall (after Raleigh CBS affiliate WRAL-TV) to begin broadcasting its local newscasts in high definition (WSOC was also the fourth Cox-owned station to upgrade its newscasts to HD, following WSB-TV and Orlando's WFTV); the WAXN broadcasts were not included in the upgrade until October 2008. In September 2010, WSOC began producing a two-hour extension of its morning newscast for WAXN, airing from 7 to 9 a.m. (which competes with WSOC's broadcast of Good Morning America).

On August 26, 2012, starting with its 6 p.m. newscast, WSOC-TV debuted a brand new news set and graphics package as well as an updated version of the station's "Circle 9" logo, which has been in use since 1984. On December 2, 2013, WSOC expanded the WAXN 10 p.m. newscast to one hour, citing the growing audience for the program (which had been placing at #1, among the prime time newscast in the Charlotte market; ahead of WCCB's late evening newscast and a WBTV-produced program on WJZY, which has since been replaced with its own in-house newscast) as the reason for the expansion.

=== Notable former on-air staff ===
- Peter Daut – anchor/reporter (2012–2014)
- Doreen Gentzler – anchor/reporter (1979–1983)
- Chuck Goudie – news reporter/sports anchor (1977–1980)
- Harold Johnson – sports director (1979–2006)
- Michelle Kosinski – reporter
- Bob Lamey – sportscaster
- Diana Williams – reporter (1979–1982)

== Technical information ==
=== Subchannels ===
The station's signal is multiplexed:

Subchannels of WSOC-TV
Channel	Res.	Short name	Programming
9.1	720p	WSOC-TV	ABC
9.2	1080i	TMNDO.	Telemundo
9.3	480i	getTV	Great (4:3)
9.4	480i	CometTV	Comet
64.3	480i	Mystery	Ion Mystery (WAXN-TV)

Broadcast on behalf of another station

On March 9, 2017, WSOC-TV announced that it would launch Telemundo Charlotte, on subchannel 9.2, which launched on June 1 of that year. Laff, which was on subchannel 9.2 since April 15, 2015, relocated to WAXN-DT4. WSOC-DT2 effectively took over the channel positions on pay-TV providers in the Charlotte market upon that day for Telemundo's national feed. WSOC-DT2 also features a secondary Spanish-language local news operation which draws from both the resources of WSOC and its own reporting. It is the first full-power over-the-air Spanish-language station in Charlotte. On May 2, 2022, GetTV switched channels from WAXN-TV to WSOC-TV subchannel 9.3.

=== Analog to digital conversion ===
WSOC-TV shut down its analog signal, over VHF channel 9, on June 12, 2009, the official date on which full-power television stations in the United States transitioned from analog to digital broadcasts under federal mandate. The station's digital signal remained on its pre-transition UHF channel 34, until it moved to channel 19 as part of the digital repack in 2019. With the switch to digital, viewers in several parts of Charlotte itself needed an attic-mounted or roof-mounted antenna to get a clear picture from the station. Digital television receivers display the station's virtual channel as its former VHF analog channel 9.

=== NextGen TV ===
WSOC-TV upgraded to NextGen TV on June 29, 2021.

=== Translators ===
Although WSOC-TV's digital transmitter operates at a full million watts, several portions of the market lost coverage when the station switched to digital. The station operates three digital translators to improve coverage in these areas: W26FA-D in Valdese signed on the air on May 28, 2009 (simulcasting WSOC on digital channel 6.1 and a widescreen standard definition feed of WAXN on digital subchannel 6.2), in order to serve the Unifour region of the state. WSOCTV1 is a displacement translator on VHF channel 12 (virtual channel 9.5), which transmits from Crowders Mountain to serve Shelby, it signed on the air on January 15, 2010. WSOCTV2, Statesville went on the air on June 23, 2012, at 5:58 p.m., broadcasting on VHF channel 12 (virtual channel 9.9). WSOC previously operated a displacement translator for WAXN-TV in China Grove, on WAXNTV1 (UHF channel 30), which also carried a widescreen standard definition feed of WSOC-TV on virtual channel 9.7, until it was shut down on October 15, 2012.

==== W26FA-D Marion ====
Subchannels of W26FA-D Marion
Channel	Res.	Short name	Programming
6.1	720p	WSOC-TR	Simulcast of WSOC-TV
6.2	480i	WAXN-TR	Ion Mystery (WAXN-TV)

Broadcast on behalf of another station

==== WSOC-CR Shelby ====
Subchannels of WSOC from the Crowders Mountain transmitter (Shelby)
Channel	Res.	Short name	Programming
9.5	720p	WSOC-CR	Simulcast of WSOC-TV
9.6	480i	TELE-CR	Simulcast of WSOC 9.2

==== WSOC-ST Statesville ====
Subchannels of WSOC from the Statesville transmitter
Channel	Res.	Short name	Programming
9.9	720p	WSOC-ST	Simulcast of WSOC-TV
9.10	480i	Tele-ST	Simulcast of WSOC 9.2

== Out-of-market cable and DirecTV carriage ==
In recent years, WSOC has been carried on cable in several areas outside of the Charlotte television market, including on cable systems within the Greensboro–Winston-Salem–High Point market in North Carolina, the Greenville and Florence–Myrtle Beach markets in South Carolina, and the Tri-Cities market in Tennessee and Virginia. On DirecTV, WSOC has been carried in several counties that are part of the Greensboro–Winston-Salem–High Point market.
