= WTVI (Florida) =

Television station in Fort Pierce, Florida (1960–1962)

- Fort Pierce, Florida; United States
- Channels: Analog: 19 (UHF)

Programming
- Affiliations: CBS (1960–1962)

Ownership
- Owner: Atlantic Broadcasting Company, Inc.

History
- First air date: November 21, 1960
- Last air date: January 6, 1962

Technical information
- ERP: 237 kW
- HAAT: 134 m (438 ft)
- Transmitter coordinates: 27°32′47″N 80°22′6.5″W

WTVI (channel 19) was a television station in Fort Pierce, Florida, United States. It was the first television station to operate in the Treasure Coast region. The station made two unsuccessful attempts operating, once from November 1960 to February 1961 and again from September 1961 to January 1962. Financial problems related to its UHF operation and competition from a local cable system doomed the venture. WTVI equipment, buildings and personnel later were used in the start-up of two other stations, one of them in Fort Pierce.

== History ==
=== Construction and first incarnation ===
On April 19, 1955, the Federal Communications Commission (FCC) granted Gene T. Dyer a construction permit for a new television station to operate on channel 19 at Fort Pierce, Florida. Dyer was no stranger to broadcasting; he owned WAIT in Chicago and founded WFTL in Fort Lauderdale and was described in a 1948 profile of the Chicago market by Broadcasting magazine as "one of Chicago's best-known radio figures", while he was a tomato packer and vegetable farmer in Florida, alongside major land holdings in St. Lucie County. The call letters WTVI were assigned in May. In 1956, WTVI proposed to have the then-vacant channel 3 allocation at St. Petersburg moved to Fort Pierce for its use, noting that there were no applicants for the channel and UHF conversion rates in Fort Pierce were below 10 percent. Educational interests in the St. Petersburg area resisted the proposal, noting that a group was being formed to apply for it, and the bid to move channel 3 was denied in 1957.

Construction activity for channel 19 started in earnest in early 1960, and conflict emerged on two fronts. The larger of the two was that a cable system was gearing up to serve Fort Pierce at the same time WTVI began building its facility. Florida Cablevision promised to fill the blanks for Treasure Coast viewers with missing CBS and ABC service (the only station that came in regularly was WPTV), which WTVI sought to provide directly. Meanwhile, WTVI was approved to build its studio halfway between Fort Pierce and Vero Beach, complete with a 445-foot (136 m) tower. The Federal Aviation Administration (FAA) cleared the tower, four miles (6.4 km) from the county airport, though some on the county's airport commission feared the approval could jeopardize the airport's eligibility for federal funds. Dyer protested the cable system's plan to import distant network affiliates, which it saw as competition. Cablevision alleged that Dyer was attempting to force Cablevision out and obtain a franchise for himself.

WTVI began telecasting on November 21, 1960. The signal was also available on the cable system; subscribers to Florida Cablevision would not need a UHF converter to see WTVI. The station was an exclusive CBS affiliate and aired network programming as well as local newscasts and a children's show known as Uncle Harry's Fun Club, hosted by Harry Heritage, who doubled as Santa Claus in Fort Pierce. However, channel 19's first incarnation would not last three months. On February 10, 1961, owner Dyer announced that the station would cease telecasting at the end of the day due to financial troubles. In a statement, Dyer noted that he had spent $500,000—more than the projected $250,000—and wanted investors to help shoulder the burden. Several viewers were frustrated to have bought UHF converters to receive WTVI, only for the station to fail.

=== Atlantic Broadcasting ownership and second incarnation ===
Dyer sold the dark television station for $175,795 to Atlantic Broadcasting Company, which owned KFEQ-TV in St. Joseph, Missouri, and a radio station in Jefferson City in the same state, in mid-1961. The sale price was less than the $300,000 in costs Dyer incurred building WTVI and mostly consisted of a debt to General Electric. Channel 19 returned to the air September 10, 1961, but further financial problems dogged WTVI. It missed an interest payment to Dyer in October, and in December, Atlantic told Dyer that it wanted to cancel its purchase of the business. WTVI went off the air on January 6, 1962. Later that month, Atlantic filed a formal complaint with the FCC, stating that competition from the cable system had placed a financial strain on WTVI. The special temporary authority that Atlantic sought when the station went dark turned permanent when Atlantic conveyed the facility back to Dyer and surrendered the license. Jesse D. Fine, the president of Atlantic, explained that if WTVI had operated for a year, it would have lost an estimated $80,000 to $100,000.

=== After closure ===
When WTVI closed for the second time, local leaders sensed an opportunity to provide a facility that did not exist in the Indian River area: an instructional television station. The county school superintendent and an engineer from the Florida Educational Television Commission met with Dyer in March to survey the former WTVI facilities, finding them in excellent condition. Arrangements had been worked out with Dyer and with GE, whose mortgage on station equipment continued in force, for potential purchase of the facility, as backers waited on Congress to pass an appropriations bill for educational television. However, the St. Lucie County Taxpayers Association mounted a revolt; its president called the reported $25,000 monthly cost "not feasible from a cost standpoint" and said an educational TV station was too expensive for the low school population it would serve in St. Lucie County.

While officials from four counties attempted to figure out a way forward, the taxpayer revolt and cost disagreements with Dyer scuttled the plan. On May 1, the Charlotte-Mecklenburg Board of Education purchased all of the equipment used in operating WTVI in Fort Pierce, minus the building, to be moved to start an instructional television station in Charlotte, North Carolina; the facility cost $86,200. In a statement, Dyer blamed the local press and the taxpayers' association for scuttling any possibility of channel 19 being reactivated as an educational station for the Fort Pierce area, though school officials contended he was still asking $120,000 instead of offering to donate it outright. When the Charlotte station got its construction permit, it selected the WTVI call letters for itself.

In 1965, Indian River Television, owned by Michael Beacom, applied to build a new television station on channel 19 in Fort Pierce. Beacom had been a 10 percent owner of WTVI, but he was not active in its management because he was tending to problems that had arisen at another station he owned, WJPB-TV in Fairmont, West Virginia. However, that summer, the FCC overhauled the UHF table of allocations nationwide in Docket 14229 and substituted channel 34 for 19 at Fort Pierce. After acquiring the former WTVI building from Dyer for $50,000, Indian River's station—taking the call letters WTVX—signed on with a test pattern on March 24, 1966. WTVX operated from the old WTVI studios until relocating to larger, more modern quarters in 1980; a church later occupied the facility.
