= WNSC-FM =

Coordinates: 34.840°N 81.018°W

- Rock Hill, South Carolina; United States
- Frequency: 88.9 MHz (HD Radio)
- Branding: 88.9 WNSC

Programming
- Format: Public radio, news/talk
- Affiliations: NPR, South Carolina Public Radio

Ownership
- Owner: South Carolina Educational Television Commission

History
- First air date: January 3, 1978 (as WPRV)
- Former call signs: WPRV (1978–1980)
- Call sign meaning: "North and South Carolina"

Technical information
- Licensing authority: FCC
- Facility ID: 60962
- Class: C1
- ERP: 100,000 watts
- HAAT: 183 meters (600 ft)

Links
- Public license information: Public file; LMS
- Webcast: Listen live
- Website: southcarolinapublicradio.org

WNSC-FM (88.9 MHz) is a National Public Radio station in Rock Hill, South Carolina. A member of South Carolina Public Radio (formerly ETV Radio), it carries programming from South Carolina Public Radio's all-news network.

== History ==
=== News and classical music ===
WNSC-FM signed on January 3, 1978, as WPRV, initially broadcasting instructional programs during the day before beginning full-time broadcasting in July. The same day it went on the air, WNSC-TV channel 30 began broadcasting. WPRV was the first NPR station in the Charlotte area; the market's flagship NPR station, WFAE, did not sign on in its current form until 1981. The call letters were changed to WNSC-FM on October 27, 1980. From its sign-on until 2001, it aired a format of NPR news and classical music along with the rest of what was then the South Carolina Educational Radio Network (SCERN).

=== Jazz and talk ===
In 2001, it broke off from the rest of the SCERN stations to air jazz music under the moniker of "Carolinas Jazz 88.9" in order to avoid programming conflicts with WFAE. Before the switch, WNSC-FM aired many of the same news and talk programs as WFAE, such as Fresh Air, Morning Edition and This American Life. Barbara Nail moved from WFAE to host a jazz show on Friday nights.

However, on July 1, 2008, it joined ETV Radio's NPR news network. SCETV president Moss Bresnahan told The Charlotte Observer that SCETV did not want to deny people on the South Carolina side of the Charlotte market access to SCETV's growing slate of local programming. The move left the Charlotte market without a jazz station of its own.

== Penetration ==
WNSC is one of only two stations on the South Carolina side of the market (the other being WOSF, which is licensed to Gaffney) that penetrates Charlotte to any significant extent. Its 97,900-watt signal easily covers Charlotte itself, as well as Gaston and Union counties. However, it only provides fringe coverage to the northern part of the market (Concord, Lincolnton, Mooresville, etc.). Until the spring of 2011, it identified as "Rock Hill/Charlotte," making it the only ETV station to include a second city in its legal ID. This is despite the fact that sister station WLJK in Aiken also serves Augusta, Georgia.

== Studios and tower ==
Its studios are at York Technical College, with its transmitting tower five miles south of Rock Hill (at 34° 50' 23.00" North Latitude, 81° 01' 6.00" West Longitude).
