= WNSC-TV =

Television station in Rock Hill, South Carolina

Satellite of WRLK-TV, Columbia, South Carolina
- Rock Hill, South Carolina; Charlotte, North Carolina; United States
- City: Rock Hill, South Carolina
- Channels: Digital: 34 (UHF); Virtual: 30
- Branding: ETV Carolinas

Programming
- Affiliations: 30.1: PBS; for others, see § Subchannels

Ownership
- Owner: South Carolina Educational Television Commission
- Sister stations: WNSC-FM

History
- First air date: January 3, 1978
- Former channel numbers: Analog: 30 (UHF, 1978–2009); Digital: 15 (UHF, until 2019)
- Call sign meaning: North and South Carolina

Technical information
- Licensing authority: FCC
- Facility ID: 61009
- ERP: 1,000 kW
- HAAT: 209.9 m (689 ft)
- Transmitter coordinates: 34°50′23.3″N 81°1′6″W

Links
- Public license information: Public file; LMS
- Website: www.scetv.org

WNSC-TV (channel 30) is a PBS member television station in Rock Hill, South Carolina, United States. It is owned by the South Carolina Educational Television Commission alongside public radio station WNSC-FM (88.9). WNSC-TV's studios are located inside the C Building on the campus of York Technical College on South Anderson Road in Rock Hill, and its transmitter is located in southeastern York County (east of I-77).

WNSC-TV operates as a member station of South Carolina Educational Television (SCETV). Master control and most internal operations are based at SCETV's headquarters at the SCETV Telecommunications Center on the campus of the University of South Carolina on George Rogers Boulevard across from Williams-Brice Stadium in Columbia. On cable, WNSC-TV is available on channel 15 throughout most of the Charlotte, North Carolina, television market.

== History ==
The station first signed on the air on January 3, 1978, initially broadcasting instructional programs during the day before beginning full-time broadcasting in July. (WPRV, now WNSC-FM, signed on the same day.) WNSC debuted as the sixth full-power station aligned with SCETV, and the third public television station to serve the Charlotte area, after WTVI (channel 42) and Concord-based UNC-TV station WUNG-TV (channel 58). Previously, SCETV programming had been seen in the Rock Hill area via low-power translator station W55AA on UHF channel 55 (that channel was later occupied by MyNetworkTV affiliate WMYT-TV).

== Programming ==
WNSC-TV originates some local programming, including Piedmont Politics, and also carries national and statewide programs from PBS and SCETV. Its digital subchannels carry the South Carolina Channel, ETV World and SCETV PBS Kids.

=== Local and regional programming ===
- Talk of the Town – a community affairs talk show hosted by Bill Curry
- Mary Long's Yesteryear – hosted by Mary Long
- Fret & Fiddle – a songwriter performance showcase
- Metrolina Illustrated Newsmagazine created, hosted and produced by Chuck Smith (1988–1991)
- Rock Hill: Primetime – created and produced by Chuck Smith (1991–1992)
- Carolina Weekends – created, hosted and produced by Chuck Smith (1988–1991)

== Technical information ==
=== Subchannels ===
The station's digital signal is multiplexed:

Subchannels of WNSC-TV
Channel	Res.	Short name	Programming
30.1	1080i	ETV	PBS
30.2	480i	SCC	South Carolina Channel (local documentaries / Create from 12 midnight to 8 p.m.)
30.3	480i	ETVW	ETV World (PBS West Coast feed and block programming from BBC, DW-TV and NHK World)
30.4	480i	ETVK	ETV Kids

=== Analog-to-digital conversion ===
WNSC-TV shut down its analog signal, over UHF channel 30, at midnight on February 18, 2009 (along with the other SCETV stations), the day after some full-power television stations in the United States transitioned from analog to digital broadcasts (February 17 was the original target date for the transition until the Federal Communications Commission moved the transition date to June 12 earlier in the month). The station's digital signal remained on its pre-transition UHF channel 15, using virtual channel 30.
