= WEPR =

- Greenville, South Carolina; United States
- Broadcast area: Upstate South Carolina & Western North Carolina
- Frequency: 90.1 MHz (HD Radio)
- Branding: WEPR 90.1

Programming
- Format: Public radio; Classical music
- Affiliations: NPR; South Carolina Public Radio

Ownership
- Owner: South Carolina Educational TV Commission

History
- First air date: September 3, 1972; 53 years ago
- Call sign meaning: "Public radio"

Technical information
- Licensing authority: FCC
- Facility ID: 60926
- Class: C
- ERP: 85,000 watts
- HAAT: 361 meters
- Transmitter coordinates: 34°56′29.00″N 82°24′38.00″W

Links
- Public license information: Public file; LMS
- Webcast: Listen live
- Website: southcarolinapublicradio.org

WEPR (90.1 FM) is a noncommercial radio station in Greenville, South Carolina featuring Classical music as well as news and other programs from NPR. The station is part of the statewide "Classical NPR network" from South Carolina Public Radio.

With its 85,000-watt ERP, WEPR is one of ETV Radio's most powerful stations. In addition to its primary coverage area of the Upstate, its signal penetrates well into Western North Carolina, providing city-grade coverage as far north as Asheville.

WEPR was the first public radio station in South Carolina, signing on in 1972. Originally licensed to Clemson, it moved to Greenville in the 1980s.
