= WRJA-FM =

- Sumter, South Carolina; United States
- Broadcast area: Central South Carolina - Columbia metropolitan area
- Frequency: 88.1 MHz (HD Radio)
- Branding: South Carolina Public Radio

Programming
- Format: Public radio and talk
- Affiliations: National Public Radio; Public Radio Exchange; American Public Media; BBC World Service

Ownership
- Owner: South Carolina Educational TV Commission

History
- First air date: August 25, 1975
- Former call signs: WMPR (1975–1980)
- Call sign meaning: R. J. Aycock

Technical information
- Licensing authority: FCC
- Facility ID: 60974
- Class: C
- ERP: 98,000 watts
- HAAT: 305 meters (1,001 ft)
- Transmitter coordinates: 33°52′52″N 80°16′12″W

Links
- Public license information: Public file; LMS
- Webcast: Listen live
- Website: southcarolinapublicradio.org

WRJA-FM (88.1 MHz) is a non-commercial radio station licensed to Sumter, South Carolina, United States, serving both Columbia and Florence, South Carolina. It is the flagship of the statewide public radio "News and Talk Network" from South Carolina Public Radio (SCPR) and is a member of NPR.

WRJA-FM's offices and studios are on George Rogers Boulevard in Columbia. The transmitter is on ETV Tower Road in Sumter, sharing a tower with co-owned WRJA-TV.

WRJA broadcasts in HD radio, carrying its primary NPR/South Carolina Public Radio signal over HD-1, while also carrying "Sound Shift", a new program featuring classical music, jazz, and much more music on its HD-2.

== History ==
The station signed on the air on August 25, 1975. Its original call sign was WMPR. It was part of the South Carolina Educational Radio Network, featuring local programming from SCERN as well as network shows from NPR. It became WRJA-FM in 1980.

In 2001, the station, along with WJWJ-FM in Beaufort/Charleston and WHMC in Conway/Myrtle Beach, began airing a separate program schedule from the rest of the SCERN stations. These outlets, part of the "News and Talk Network," began carrying a mix of news and information programs with some jazz, blues and world music on weekends. The remaining stations, part of the "News and Music Network," play classical music during middays and nights with news and information programs during morning and afternoon drive times and some hours on weekends.

In 2026, SCETV/SCPR announced that all SCPR radio stations would begin carrying a new music channel on HD-2 called "Sound Shift", featuring classical music, jazz, and much more. This operation is said to fully begin by the end of the year, as not all SCPR stations have HD channels as of this edit being made.

== Programming ==
On weekdays, the "News and Talk Network," including WRJA, carries news programs from NPR and other public radio networks. BBC World Service runs all night. SCPR also produces Roots Music Karamu with Osei Chandler, heard on all stations (music network and talk network) on Saturday nights.
