= WHMC-FM =

- Conway, South Carolina; United States
- Broadcast area: Myrtle Beach, South Carolina
- Frequency: 90.1 MHz
- Branding: WHMC 90.1

Programming
- Format: Public radio; News/Talk
- Affiliations: National Public Radio

Ownership
- Owner: South Carolina Educational TV Commission

History
- First air date: 1981; 45 years ago

Technical information
- Licensing authority: FCC
- Facility ID: 60998
- Class: C1
- ERP: 30,000 watts
- HAAT: 215 meters
- Transmitter coordinates: 33°57′5.00″N 79°6′31.00″W

Links
- Public license information: Public file; LMS
- Website: www.southcarolinapublicradio.org

WHMC-FM (90.1 FM) is a public radio station, licensed to Conway, South Carolina, and serving the Grand Strand. The station is owned by South Carolina Educational TV Commission. WHMC-FM is a member of NPR and an affiliate of South Carolina Public Radio's all-news network, airing a talk radio format with some jazz and special music programs on weekends.

== History ==
This station signed on in 1981 and played classical music most of the time until 2005, when the decision was made to provide more NPR news programming to the Grand Strand.
