= WJWJ-FM =

- Beaufort, South Carolina; United States
- Broadcast area: South Carolina Lowcountry
- Frequency: 89.9 MHz
- Branding: South Carolina Public Radio

Programming
- Format: Public Radio and talk
- Affiliations: NPR; APM; PRX; BBC World Service

Ownership
- Owner: South Carolina Educational TV Commission

History
- First air date: August 1, 1980
- Call sign meaning: James M. Waddell, Jr., former state legislator

Technical information
- Licensing authority: FCC
- Facility ID: 61006
- Class: C1
- ERP: 48,000 watts
- HAAT: 334 meters (1,096 ft)
- Transmitter coordinates: 32°42′42″N 80°40′54″W

Links
- Public license information: Public file; LMS
- Webcast: Listen live
- Website: southcarolinapublicradio.org

WJWJ-FM (89.9 FM) is a non-commercial radio station licensed to Beaufort, South Carolina, United States, and serving the South Carolina Lowcountry. It is part of the statewide "News and Talk Network" from South Carolina Public Radio (SCPR) and is a member of National Public Radio (NPR). The offices and studios are on George Rogers Boulevard in Columbia.

WJWJ-FM's transmitter is off White Hall Road near Green Pond, South Carolina, in Colleton County.

== History ==
The station signed on the air on August 1, 1980, using the same tower as WJWJ-TV and same call sign as the television station, named after James M. Waddell, Jr., a former state legislator.

At first, WJWJ-FM offered a format of NPR information shows and classical music. In 2001, WJWJ-FM was the first SCPR station to switch to an all-spoken word format as part its "News and Talk Network." At the time, both 91.1 WSVH in Savannah (owned by Georgia Public Radio) and 89.3 WSCI in Charleston (owned by SCPR) provided the WJWJ-FM listening area with fine arts programming while WJWJ-FM could go all news and information, ending all music shows except for a few on weekends.

WJWJ-FM occasionally broke from the network to air local shows from SCETV's studios in Beaufort. However, with the change in formats, all local programming ended. WJWJ-FM's entire schedule is now fed from Columbia. It is the only full-time NPR news/talk station in the area, as WSVH and WSCI still have blocks of classical and other music.

== Programming ==
On weekdays, the "News and Talk Network," including WJWJ-FM, airs news programs from NPR and other public radio networks. The BBC World Service runs all night. SCPR also produces Roots Music Karamu with Osei Chandler, heard on all stations (music network and talk network) on Saturday nights.
