= Reedy Creek Park =

Park in North Carolina, US

- Interactive map of Reedy Creek Park
- Type: Public park
- Location: Charlotte, North Carolina
- Coordinates: 35.2755°N 80.7169°W
- Area: 125 acres (51 ha)
- Created: 1981
- Operator: Mecklenburg County Parks and Recreation
- Website: Reedy Creek Park

Reedy Creek Park is a 125-acre (51 ha) urban park at 2900 Rocky River Road in the Newell section of Charlotte, North Carolina. Adjacent to the park is a 737 acre nature preserve.

The main park contains courts and fields for basketball, softball, tennis, soccer, horseshoes, cricket, and volleyball. There are indoor and outdoor picnic facilities, extensive benches, playgrounds, a disc golf course, a dog park, a community garden, several ponds, and a lakeside fishing pier. Reedy Creek Park is the home of the Charlotte based South Park Cricket Club.

The ruins of the John Robinson Rockhouse, a revolutionary era structure dating from the 1780s, lies deep within Reedy Creek Park, and can be reached by one of the popular trails leading through the nature preserve. It was added to the National Register of Historic Places in 2009.

== Reedy Creek Nature Center and Preserve ==
The associated nature preserve is heavily forested and contains over ten miles of hiking trails, some of them quite challenging. Within the preserve headquarters there are exhibit halls, classrooms, a gift shop, and a National Wildlife Federation certified Habitat Garden which features bird feeding stations. Each year the preserve is the site of the Reedy Creek Nature Center Hummingbird Festival, which attracts up to 3000 visitors.

The City of Charlotte purchased the land that now comprises Reedy Creek Park in 1981. Mecklenburg County became the owner when the City and County Park and Recreation Departments merged in 1991, and shortly after that built the Reedy Creek Environmental Center (later to be named the Nature Center).

In May 2010 the Mecklenburg County Park and Recreation Department, with over $50,000 in donations from local and state organizations, opened a special children's playground in the Nature Center. This playground, dubbed a "Nature Explorer Zone" and designed by Robin Moore of North Carolina State University and the Arbor Day Foundation, is built entirely in the woods and features various children's activities such as stump jumps, a sand play area, log balancing, a grapevine crawl, a fort building area, a "messy materials" area, and a stage for dramatic plays.
