= South Carolina Educational Television =

PBS member network in South Carolina

- Type: Non-commercial educational broadcast television network
- Branding: SCETV
- Country: United States
- Availability: statewide South Carolina
- TV stations: See § Regional television stations
- TV transmitters: 11
- Headquarters: 1041 George Rogers Boulevard, Columbia, South Carolina
- Owner: South Carolina Educational Television Commission
- Launch date: September 8, 1958; 68 years ago
- Picture format: 480i (SDTV) (1958–2009); 1080i (HDTV) (2009–present)
- Affiliations: PBS, APT
- Former affiliations: NET (1958–1970)
- Official website: www.scetv.org

South Carolina Educational Television (branded as South Carolina ETV, SCETV or simply ETV) is a state network of PBS member television stations serving the U.S. state of South Carolina. It is operated by the South Carolina Educational Television Commission, an agency of the state government which holds the licenses for all of the PBS member stations licensed in the state. The broadcast signals of the eleven television stations cover almost all of the state, as well as parts of North Carolina and Georgia.

The network's primary operations are located at the SCETV Telecommunications Center on the campus of the University of South Carolina on George Rogers Boulevard across from Williams-Brice Stadium in Columbia; SCETV operates satellite studios inside the Media Building on the campus of the University of South Carolina Upstate on University Way in Spartanburg, on North Harvin Street in Sumter, inside the C Building on the campus of York Technical College on South Anderson Road in Rock Hill, and on the campus of the Technical College of the Lowcountry on Ribaut Road in Beaufort.

== History ==
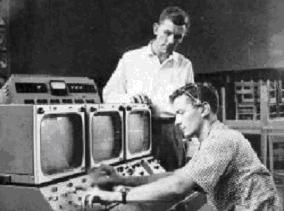
SCETV's first telecast in 1958, from Dreher High School.

The South Carolina General Assembly in 1958 authorized a study to see if instructional television could assist the state's public schools. Dreher High School in Columbia, South Carolina lent its library to be the study's studio. The first courses (a French course taught by Madame Lucille Turney-High and a geometry course taught by Cornelia Turnbull) were transmitted on September 8, 1958, via closed-circuit television. Following the study's success, the South Carolina Educational Television Commission (ETV) was created as a state agency, on July 1, 1960. By 1962 ETV extended closed-circuit, classroom television service to most South Carolina counties.

In 1963, the Commission launched the first open-circuit (broadcast) educational station in South Carolina, WNTV in Greenville. One year later, WITV in Charleston signed on. Two years later, WRLK-TV in Columbia, made its debut. The network grew to eleven television transmitters covering all of the state. After years of receiving NET and PBS programs on tape delay, it entered PBS' satellite network in 1978. In 2000, SCETV broadcast the first digital television program in the state. Since 2003, the state network identifies on-air as simply "ETV."

Station identification for ETV HD (circa 2009).

South Carolina Educational Radio (public radio) began in 1972, when WEPR in Clemson signed on the air with maximum power of 100,000 watts (WEPR later moved its city of license to Greenville). The network eventually expanded to eight radio transmitters (five 100 kW and three 30 kW transmitters). The South Carolina Educational Radio Network was renamed ETV Radio in 2003. "ETV" was viewed as a general brand name for both radio and television. In 2015, the radio network was called South Carolina Public Radio.

R. Lynn Kalmbach was selected as the network's project director in 1958 and led it until his death in 1965. Henry J. Cauthen became ETV's president and general manager and served in numerous leadership roles developing American public broadcasting, including chair of the Corporation for Public Broadcasting (CPB). Cauthen retired in 1997. Paul Amos served as ETV's third president from 1998 until his death in 2000. Maurice "Moss" Bresnahan was ETV's president and CEO from 2001 to 2008. David Crouch served as interim president in 2009. Linda O'Bryon was president from 2010 to 2017. Anthony Padgett is the current president and CEO.

=== Digital TV era ===
Despite the DTV Delay Act national transition extension to June 12, 2009, SCETV discontinued the analog signals of its 11 full-power stations February 18, 2009.

Each station's post-transition digital allocations and the FCC Repack Plan (2017) are as follows:

Call Letters	Initial Analog Channel	Pre-Transition Digital Channel	Post-Transition Digital Channel	FCC Repack Plan (2017)
WEBA-TV	14	33	33	21
WHMC	23	9	9	11 (28)
WITV	7	49	7	9 (24)
WJPM-TV	33	45	45	16
WJWJ-TV	16	44	44	32
WNEH	38	18	18	26
WNSC-TV	30	15	15	34
WNTV	29	9	9	8
WRET-TV	49	43	43	8 (shared with WNTV)
WRJA-TV	27	28	28	29
WRLK-TV	35	32	32	33

On April 13, 2017, the FCC identified SCETV will be compensated $43.2 million to have WRET-TV go off-the-air as part of the Spectrum auction. WRET will relinquish RF 43 and go into a channel sharing arrangement with WNTV, starting on January 23, 2018. On August 30, 2017, PBS Kids was added on new subchannel .4 and online.

On October 31, 2017, SCETV submitted an application to change the digital terrestrial signal of WITV from channel 7 (VHF) to channel 24 (UHF); the changeover was scheduled to take place between May and July 2020.

== Commission ==
There are nine members of the ETV Commission. Eight are appointed by the Governor for six-year terms—one from each Congressional District and one from the State at-large who serves as Chairman. The ninth member is the State Superintendent of Education who is ex-officio.

== Network ==
SCETV's television network of 11 digital transmitters covers South Carolina, as well as eastern portions of Georgia (including Augusta and Savannah) and southern portions of North Carolina (including Charlotte and Asheville). SCETV's headquarters and main production facility is located in Columbia, with production facilities (regional stations) in Rock Hill, Spartanburg and Sumter.

=== Regional television stations ===
SCETV initially planned to make all eleven of its television stations capable of airing local programming. Four full-fledged stations were built and staffed in Beaufort, Rock Hill, Spartanburg and Sumter before the idea was abandoned in the early 1980s. In 2012, WJWJ-TV in Beaufort was converted into a repeater of the network.

The original plan was for each station to carry callsigns of the form WxTV, but after WNTV and WITV signed on it was determined that there were not enough such callsigns available. Beginning with the third station, WRLK-TV in Columbia, most of the remaining callsigns represent prominent officials who either supported SCETV or represented the station's coverage area.

SCETV stations
Station	City of license	Channel; TV (RF)	Facility ID	ERP	HAAT	Transmitter coordinates	First air date	Public license information
WEBA-TV	Allendale	14 (21)	61003	371 kW	240.4 m (788.7 ft)	33°11′16″N 81°23′49.5″W	September 5, 1967	Public file; LMS
WJWJ-TV	Beaufort	16 (32)	61007	385 kW	365.5 m (1,199.1 ft)	32°42′42.5″N 80°40′53.8″W	September 6, 1975	Public file; LMS
WITV	Charleston	7 (24)	61005	1,000 kW	561.8 m (1,843.2 ft)	32°55′29″N 79°41′57″W	January 19, 1964	Public file; LMS
WRLK-TV	Columbia	35 (33)	61013	281 kW	316.9 m (1,039.7 ft)	34°7′7″N 80°56′12.7″W	September 6, 1966	Public file; LMS
WHMC	Conway	23 (28)	61004	950 kW	245.8 m (806.4 ft)	33°56′59″N 79°6′30″W	September 2, 1980	Public file; LMS
WJPM-TV	Florence	33 (16)	61008	67 kW	241.9 m (793.6 ft)	34°16′48.1″N 79°44′34.4″W	September 3, 1967	Public file; LMS
WNTV	Greenville	29 (8)	61010	180 kW	389.3 m (1,277.2 ft)	34°56′28.4″N 82°24′37″W	September 29, 1963	Public file; LMS
WNEH	Greenwood	38 (26)	60931	147 kW	234.4 m (769.0 ft)	34°22′19.9″N 82°10′3.9″W	September 10, 1984	Public file; LMS
WNSC-TV	Rock Hill	30 (34)	61009	1,000 kW	209.9 m (688.6 ft)	34°50′23.3″N 81°1′6″W	January 3, 1978	Public file; LMS
WRET-TV	Spartanburg	49 (8)	61011	180 kW	389.3 m (1,277.2 ft)	34°56′28.4″N 82°24′37″W	September 8, 1980	Public file; LMS
WRJA-TV	Sumter	27 (29)	61012	158.8 kW	354.6 m (1,163.4 ft)	33°52′52″N 80°16′14″W	September 7, 1975	Public file; LMS

Many of the stations have call signs named after former elected officials in the state. WRLK-TV was named after R. Lynn Kalmbach, the first general manager of ETV Commission, while WRET-TV was named for Richard E. Tukey, the director of Spartanburg County's Chamber of Commerce from 1951 to 1979. WJPM-TV, WJWJ-TV and WRJA-TV were all named after state legislators: WEBA-TV for Edgar Brown, WJPM-TV for James Pierce Mozingo III, WJWJ-TV for James M. Waddell, Jr. and WRJA-TV for R. J. Aycock.

WHMC used the callsign WIIB before sign-on. WJWJ-TV (branded as "ETV Lowcountry") previously maintained a regional production facility which was closed down in 2012. WNSC-TV (branded as "ETV Carolinas"), WRET-TV (branded as "ETV Upstate"), and WRJA-TV (branded as "ETV Sumter") are regional production facilities. The other six transmitters are full-time relays of WRLK (branded as "ETV Headquarters"). WRET-TV used the callsign WRTS-TV before sign-on.

=== Digital television ===
SCETV offers four digital television services available over-the-air, and through the digital tiers of some cable television providers. ETV HD is the primary feed with high definition content from PBS and SCETV broadcast in the 1080i resolution format. The South Carolina Channel (SCC) carries the national Create service daily, with regionally produced documentary programs focusing on the Carolinas airing during the evening hours. ETV World (ETVW) provides live newscasts from Europe, notably from Germany's Deutsche Welle and the United Kingdom's BBC television networks, along with live coverage from the South Carolina State House. SCETV PBS Kids is the fourth channel, a 24/7 service also available online. SCC, ETVW and ETVK are transmitted in 480i widescreen standard definition.

SCETV multiplex
Subchannel	Res.	Short name	Programming
xx.1	1080i	ETV	PBS
xx.2	480i	SCC	South Carolina Channel (local documentaries / Create from 12 midnight to 8 p.m.)
xx.3	480i	ETVW	ETV World (PBS West Coast feed and block programming from BBC, DW-TV and NHK World)
xx.4	480i	ETVK	ETV Kids

== Cable and satellite availability ==
SCETV's television network is carried on nearly every cable television provider in South Carolina. Additionally, Rock Hill's WNSC-TV is carried on Charter Spectrum's systems on the North Carolina side of the Charlotte market.

On DirecTV and Dish Network, WRLK-TV, WNTV, WITV, WNSC-TV, WJWJ-TV, WEBA-TV and WJPM-TV are respectively carried on the Columbia, Greenville–Spartanburg–Asheville, Charleston, Charlotte, Savannah, Augusta and Florence–Myrtle Beach local feeds. The South Carolina Channel, ETV World and SCETV PBS Kids have yet to be offered by satellite services.

== Former logos ==
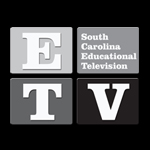
South Carolina Educational Television logo, 1958

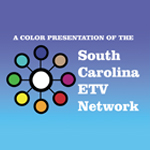
South Carolina ETV Network, first color logo, 1970

== SCETV original programming ==
- By the River
- Carolina Business Review (in conjunction with PBS NC and WTVI in Charlotte)
- Carolina Classrooms
- A Chef's Life (with Markay Media, Peabody 2013), Emmy for Outstanding Directing Lifestyle/Culinary/Travel, 2014
- ETV Classics
- Expeditions with Patrick McMillan
- For Your Home
- From the Sky
- Live at the Charleston Music Hall
- Live coverage of the South Carolina State House
- Making it Grow
- Palmetto Scene
- Reel South (in conjunction with UNC-TV and The Southern Documentary Fund)
- This Week in South Carolina

=== Past programming ===
- Action Packed Cliffhangers (1980s series on the serials from the golden age of cinemas)
- American Playhouse: Roanoak (mini-series, 1986) PBS
- At Home Southern Style
- Carolina Journal
- Crucible of Empire: The Spanish American War (1999) Great Projects Film Company Inc. for PBS
- The Day the Universe Changed (BBC series, presented by SCETV in the U.S., 1986) PBS
- The Dooley and Pals Show (SCETV distributed the secular version of this children's series to PBS stations)
- Enemies of War (2001) ITVS & PBS
- Firing Line (produced by SCETV for PBS from 1971 to 1999)
- Germans in America (four-part history series 2008) public TV (syndicated)
- Great Performances: The Consul (opera, 1977) PBS
- Great Performances: Vanessa (opera, 1978) PBS
- Great Projects: The Building of America (2002) Great Projects Film Company Inc. for PBS
- Jobman Caravan
- The Magic School Bus (Animated Nelvana Limited & Scholastic co-production based on the children's book series; presented by SCETV and aired on PBS from 1994–1998), later moved to the Fox network.
- Mary Long's Yesteryear (Mary Long died in 1998, but reruns continue on The South Carolina Channel)
- NatureScene (nature walk series with hosts Rudy Mancke and Jim Welch, videography by Allen Sharpe, 1978–2003) syndicated, public television
- Palmetto Places
- Piedmont Quiz Bowl – 1980s and 1990s (WRET-TV in Spartanburg)
- Primary Colors: The Story of Corita (documentary on Corita Kent, 1990) PBS
- Priscilla's Yoga Stretches
- Profile
- Ralph Bunche: An American Odyssey (2001) Schomburg Center for Research in Black Culture, William Greaves & PBS
- Stateline
- Sandlapper's Corner (Late 1970s children's educational show focused on South Carolina culture and history)
- Six Gun Heroes (1980s series on the western stars from the golden age of cinema)
- Studio See (SCETV's magazine-style children's show, seen nationwide on PBS in the late 1970s and early 1980s)
- Under the Blue Umbrella (In-school program from the 1970s that dealt with a single-subject; nationally syndicated to PBS stations)
- Under the Yellow Balloon (Similar to Blue Umbrella; from the early 1980s)
- Voices and Visions (13-part poetry series, 2004) PBS
