= KWBU-TV =

Television station in Waco, Texas (1989–2010)

- Waco, Texas; United States
- Channels: Digital: 20 (UHF); Virtual: 34

Programming
- Affiliations: PBS (1989–2010)

Ownership
- Owner: Brazos Valley Public Broadcasting Foundation

History
- First air date: May 22, 1989 (originally low-power 1979–1989)
- Last air date: July 31, 2010
- Former call signs: KCTF (1989–2000); KWBU-TV (2000–2011); KDYW (2011–2012)
- Former channel numbers: Analog: 34 (UHF, 1989–2009)
- Call sign meaning: Waco/Baylor University

Technical information
- Facility ID: 6673
- ERP: 700 kW
- HAAT: 319 m (1,047 ft)
- Transmitter coordinates: 31°19′17″N 97°20′40″W

KWBU-TV (channel 34) was a public television station in Waco, Texas, United States, which operated from 1989 to 2010. It was owned by the Brazos Valley Public Broadcasting Foundation in an alliance with Baylor University, from whose campus it operated from 1994 to its dissolution and which held six of the foundation's twelve board seats.

Central Texas College, owner of KNCT in Belton, set up a low-power translator to extend public television service to Waco in 1979. It replaced KNCT with the high-power KCTF in 1989 and set up a studio in Waco. When the college re-evaluated its commitment to Waco, it spun KCTF out to a local community licensee, the Brazos Valley Public Broadcasting Foundation. In the 1990s, at KCTF's request, local cable systems blacked out part of the signal of Dallas public station KERA-TV, a move designed to reduce competition but which alienated potential viewers and donors.

In 1998, Brazos Valley and Baylor University teamed up. The alliance ended the KERA-TV blackout, which earned goodwill among supporters, and it brought NPR programming to the Brazos Valley with the 2000 relaunch of KWBU-FM 107.1 as a public radio station, with KCTF changing call signs to KWBU-TV. However, community support waned because the perception was that Baylor financed station operations. A shortfall in revenue and a series of funding difficulties led Baylor to refuse a request for additional support in 2010, forcing the station to leave the air. The Brazos Valley Public Broadcasting Foundation attempted to sell the license to Community Television Educators of Waco, a group associated with the Daystar Television Network, and changed the call sign to KDYW in conjunction with the pending transactions. However, questions about the nature of Daystar's proposed operation, spurred by protests to a similar station purchase in Florida, led to the deal being questioned by the Federal Communications Commission and later canceled.

== KCTF ==
=== Under Central Texas College ===
On September 23, 1977, Central Texas College, owner of KNCT in Belton, applied to the Federal Communications Commission (FCC) to set up a low-power translator of the station on channel 34 in Waco, as a way to bring PBS programming to the city. More than 400,000 people in Waco had no over-the-air public television service. The translator was installed on the grounds of Waco's VA Hospital and opened in February 1979. Viewers with cable television in Waco received KNCT and KERA-TV from Dallas as part of their lineup.

Sensing a demand for their programming in areas unserved by the 1,000-watt translator, Central Texas College looked for a way to expand in Waco. In 1987, the National Telecommunications and Information Administration awarded KNCT a grant to build a higher-power public TV station for Waco with an effective radiated power of 80,000 watts and extend public TV service to another 70,000 people. This grant and another from The Meadows Foundation made the new station, given the call sign KCTF, possible. Translator K34AB closed in January 1989 so KCTF could be built at the same site. KCTF began broadcasting on May 22, 1989. Local programming began shortly thereafter, temporarily from studios at Baylor University. In September 1989, KCTF opened its permanent studio in the St. Charles Place complex on Austin Avenue, where it produced local programs such as the public affairs program Brazos Lights, the arts program On Stage and Canvas, and the high school football show Pigskin Preview.

=== Change to community licensee ===
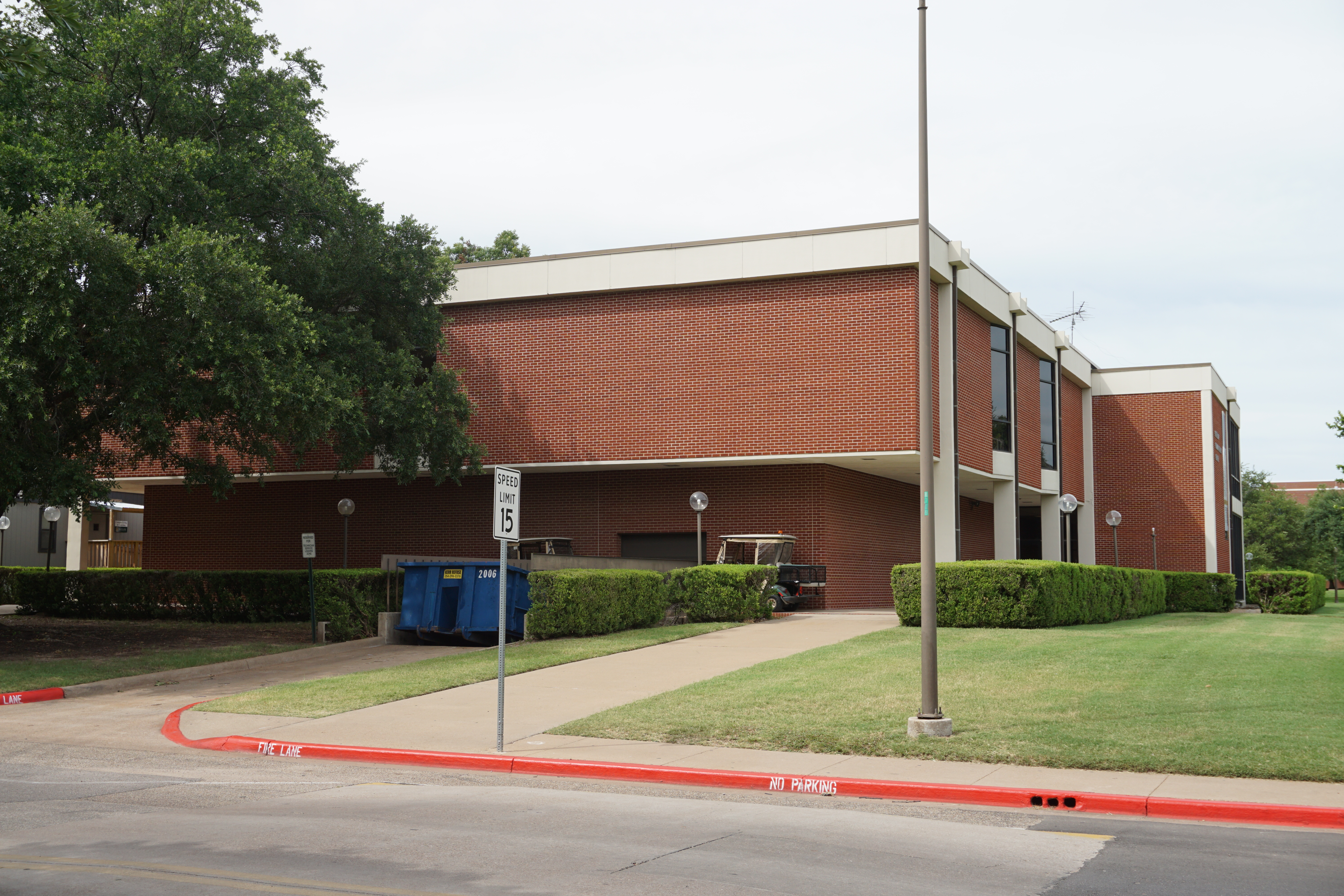
The Castellaw Communications Building...

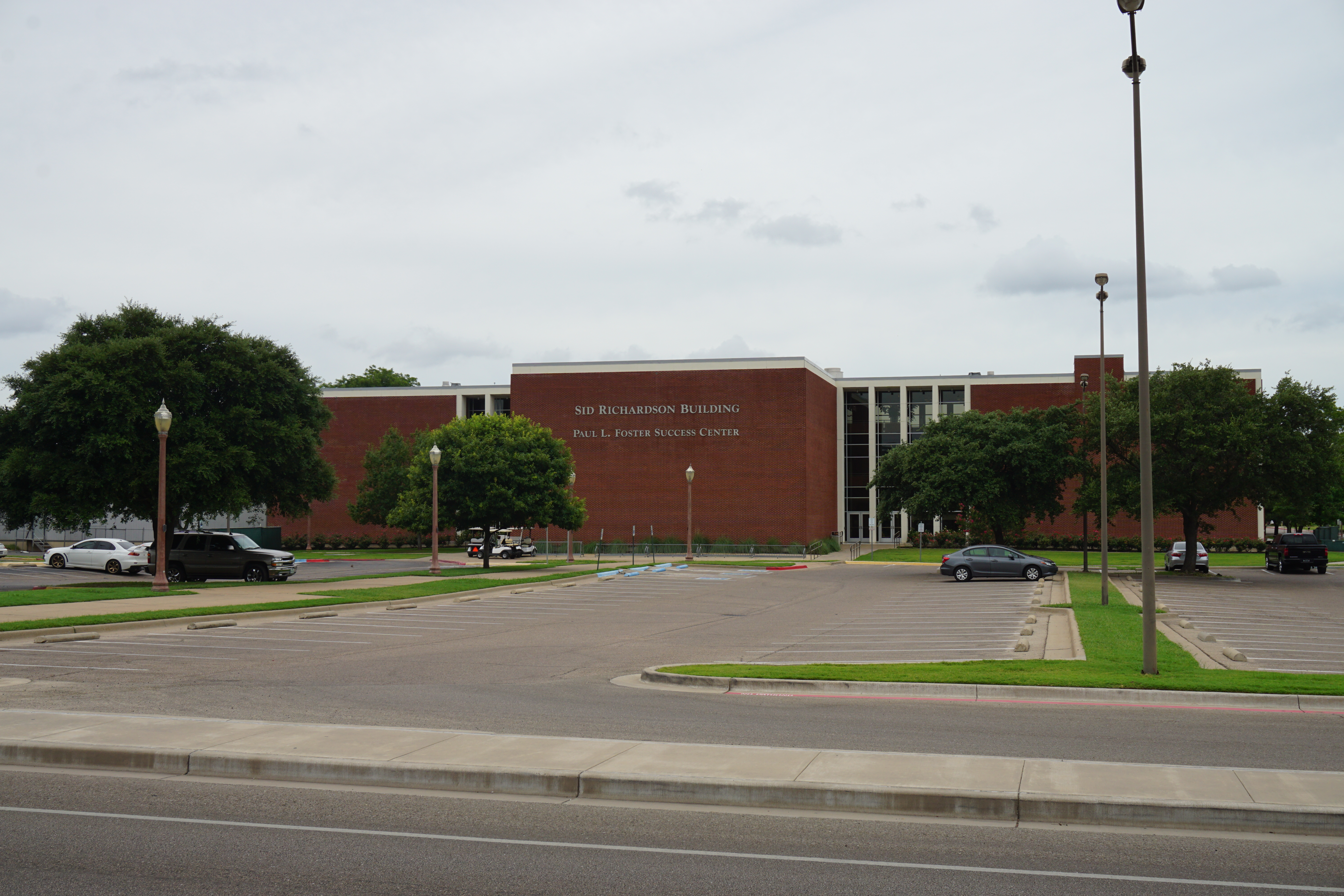
...and Sid Richardson Science Building at Baylor housed KCTF's operations beginning in 1994.

In 1991, Central Texas College began reevaluating its commitment to the Waco area, which was some distance from the college's campus in Killeen. Some in the college considered giving up KCTF. The station's advisory board found willing backers in three local educational institutions: Baylor University, Texas State Technical College, and McLennan Community College. The Brazos Valley Public Broadcasting Foundation was formed, and in 1993, it was announced that the foundation would take over KCTF. KCTF had 670 members by 1994 and 1,300 by August 1995. After the change in licensee, the station moved its operations from St. Charles Place to Baylor, operating from the Castellaw Communications Building and Sid Richardson Science Building. Brazos Lights and another program, Snapshots, were canceled due to lack of resources, though two local series remained and one—My Town, produced by Sherry Kuehl and her husband Kliff—debuted.

In October 1995, KCTF requested that CableVision of Waco black out programs from KERA-TV that also aired on KCTF. The request was part of a strategy by the station to become the primary provider of PBS programming in Waco and thereby increase viewer support that otherwise would be split between the two stations. At the time, 42 percent of KCTF's funding came from the Corporation for Public Broadcasting, a level of dependence nearly three times the average PBS station, and KERA had more members in Waco than KCTF had total. The result was that 70 percent of KERA's broadcast day was blacked out on Waco cable, angering that station's supporters and leaving some KCTF donors vowing to discontinue their memberships. Some believed that the station's stated desire to show programming meeting Waco's "community standards" as opposed to those of Dallas opened the door to censorship.

== KWBU-TV ==
=== The Baylor era ===
Brazos Valley board members, concerned that the costs of converting to digital television broadcasting would be excessive, entered into conversations with other entities in the late 1990s to transfer KCTF. Deals with KERA and with Austin's KLRU failed to materialize. In October 1998, the Brazos Valley Public Broadcasting Foundation and Baylor University reached an agreement for Baylor to provide annual support to KCTF. The college received six of the twelve seats on the new board, including Baylor president Robert B. Sloan. The tie with Baylor brought two immediate announcements. Sloan favored ending the blackout arrangement with KERA, and Gulfstar Communications, which held the rights to radio broadcasts of Baylor football, offered free use for 25 years of a tower in Moody. The FCC approved the transaction in December 1998. Public support for KCTF increased at the beginning of the Baylor era, aided by several viewers who cited the end of the blackout as their reason for giving to KCTF. A $500,000 donation from philanthropist Bernard Rapoport, the largest in station history to that time, supported the tower move, more than doubling the population served by KCTF and overlapping most of KNCT's service area.

The Brazos Valley Public Broadcasting Foundation also investigated the possibility of setting up a public radio station. At the time, Waco was the largest market in the nation without an NPR outlet. With no frequencies available to start a new station, it began talking to Baylor about adding NPR programming to the student station, KWBU-FM (then at 107.1 MHz). On July 1, 2000, KWBU-FM began airing NPR programming, and KCTF changed its call sign to KWBU-TV to match.

The new transmission facility at Moody was activated in August 2002, laying the groundwork for KWBU-TV to begin digital broadcasting in August 2003. After the change, KWBU-TV invoked must-carry to appear on the Time Warner Cable systems for Killeen and Temple, at the same time that KNCT did the same in Waco. By 2009, the station offered Create and the Spanish-language V-me as subchannels. The analog transmitter failed on February 3, 2009, two weeks before the originally planned digital television transition.

=== Funding problems and shutdown ===
The Great Recession caused community support for KWBU-TV to decline by 20 percent at the same time that debt, production, and programming costs all increased. Because of Baylor's extensive involvement in the KWBU stations, the community perceived them to be Baylor stations and not the community-licensed outlets they were, reducing local support. They only had a combined 1,600 members, insufficient to continue operations. In the late 2000s, Baylor extended a $1 million line of credit to KWBU-TV. With those funds exhausted; no further credit from Baylor, which was in the midst of installing Ken Starr as president; and a $380,000 shortfall predicted for 2010–11, the Brazos Valley Public Broadcasting Foundation announced on April 26, 2010, that the station would leave the air. Ten full-time and four part-time employees lost their jobs. KWBU-FM was continued, as it was less expensive to operate. (Note: Baylor University ended funding for the radio station in March 2025, though it would be allowed to continue using studios and offices on the Baylor campus.)

Though local programming ended at the end of May, KWBU-TV found it was contractually bound to its arrangements with PBS through June 30, forcing the station to continue another month with national programming. The Create and V-me subchannels also continued. The station was taken off the air on July 31, 2010. KNCT filled the void, being added to Grande Communications's Waco cable system, DirecTV, and Dish Network. (Note: Central Texas College sold KNCT to Gray Television in 2018, marking its end as a public station. KLRU was the replacement for cable customers and KAMU-TV in College Station for satellite customers.)

== Daystar sale attempt ==
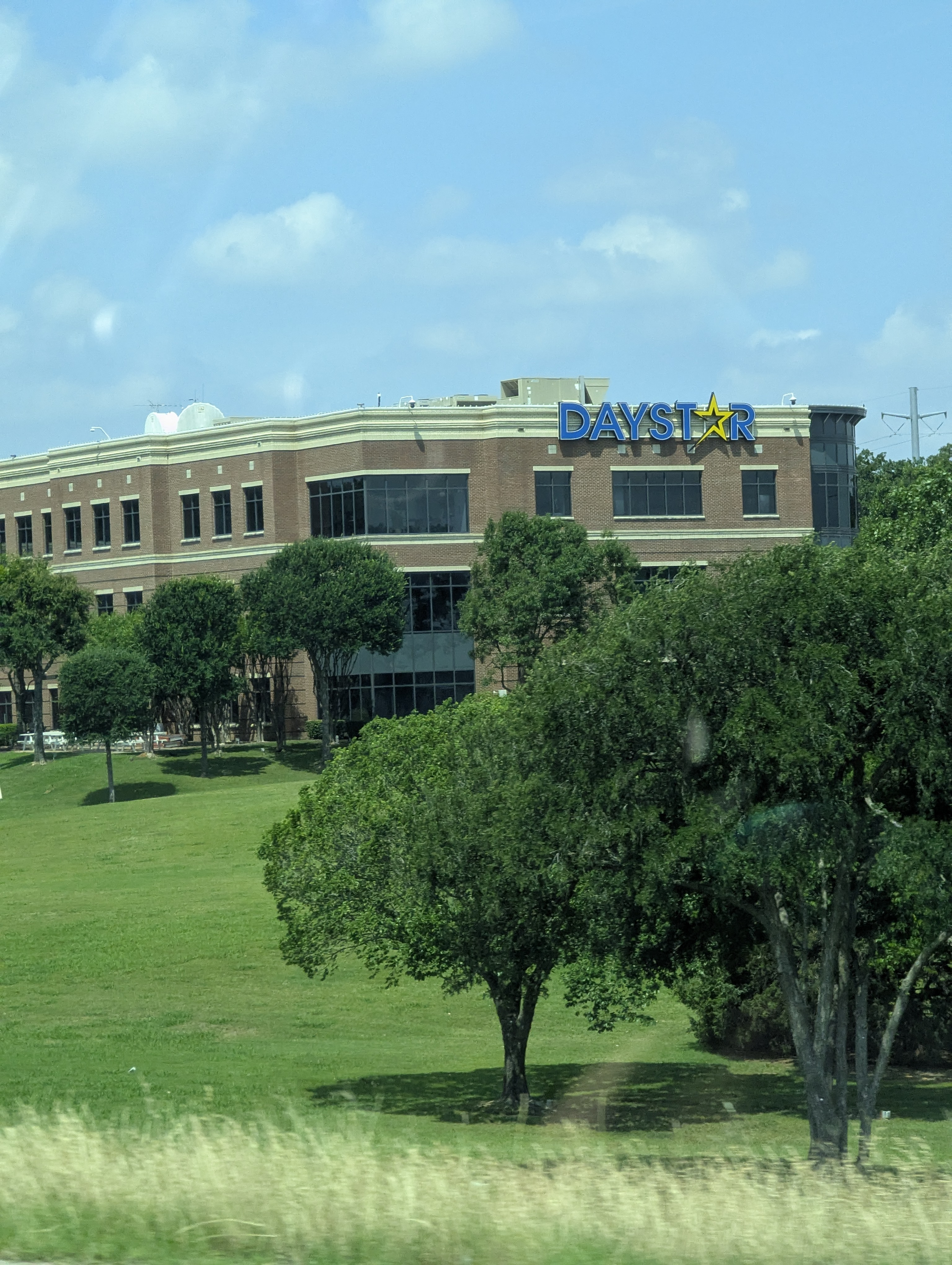
An affiliate of the Bedford, Texas–based Daystar Television Network (headquarters pictured) attempted to purchase KWBU-TV after it left the air.

Brazos Valley Public Broadcasting Foundation offered KWBU-TV's license for sale but did not attract interested buyers for months. On May 31, 2011, KWBU-TV changed its call sign to KDYW. It temporarily broadcast again from July 15 to August 5, 2011. However, it was not until mid-August 2011 that a sale contract was filed with the FCC. Brazos Valley proposed to sell KDYW for $250,000 to Community Television Educators of Waco, Inc. It was a group led by Marcus Lamb, the head of the Daystar Television Network. In paperwork filed by the purchasers, the owners planned to use the station to broadcast local, educational, ethnic and socially-relevant programming, in addition to the religious programming offered by Daystar.

KDYW was one of two non-commercial educational TV stations an affiliate of Daystar attempted to buy in 2011. That April, Community Educators of Orlando applied to acquire WMFE-TV in Orlando, Florida, a struggling PBS station whose community licensee wanted to focus on radio. The Orlando sale attracted significant pushback in that community; the FCC received more than 500 submissions protesting the sale of that station. The applications by the two Daystar affiliates were very similar in nature, with almost identical programming statements; Marcus Lamb and his wife Joni Lamb as the only officers; and a proposal for 11 hours a week of local programming, which in Waco amounted to programming from Waco's government access cable channel. The FCC questioned whether the nonprofits listed as the prospective owners of WMFE and KDYW were actually shell companies for Daystar and whether the stations would air enough educational programming to meet the conditions for the stations' non-commercial licenses. In March 2012, it requested more information from the two proposed licensees.

On September 7, 2012, the Brazos Valley Public Broadcasting Foundation informed the FCC that it would request the dismissal of the license assignment application and return the KDYW license to the commission. Per the foundation's request, the FCC canceled the channel 34 license on September 27.
