= KNCT =

KNCT may refer to:

- KNCT-FM, a radio station (91.3 FM) licensed to Killeen, Texas, United States
- KNCT (TV), a television station (channel 17, virtual 46) licensed to Belton, Texas, United States
