= KWBU =

KWBU may refer to:

- KWBU-FM, a radio station (103.3 FM) licensed to Waco, Texas, United States
- KWBU-TV, a defunct television station (channel 34 analog/20 digital) licensed to Waco, Texas, United States that broadcast under the "KWBU-TV" callsign
