= KNCT (TV) =

Television station in Belton, Texas

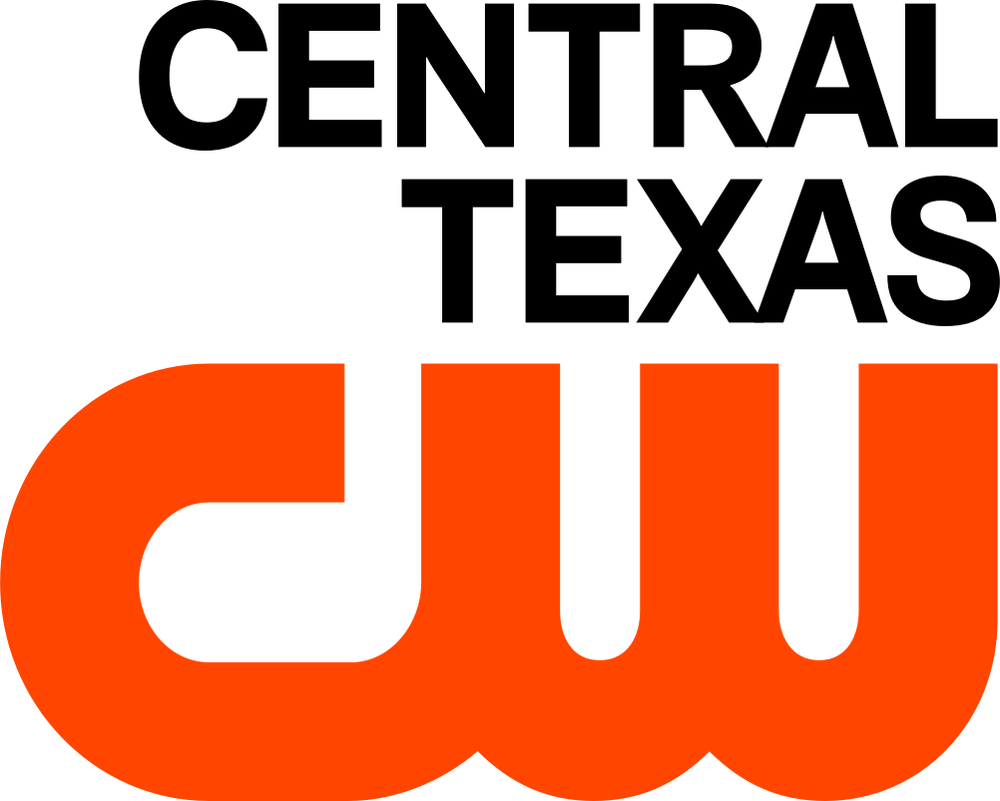
- Belton–Killeen–Temple–Waco, Texas; United States
- City: Belton, Texas
- Channels: Digital: 17 (UHF); Virtual: 46
- Branding: CW Central Texas; Central Texas CW News at 9

Programming
- Affiliations: 46.1: The CW; for others, see § Technical information and subchannels

Ownership
- Owner: Gray Media; (Gray Television Licensee, LLC)
- Sister stations: KWTX-TV; KBTX-TV

History
- First air date: November 23, 1970
- Former channel numbers: Analog: 46 (UHF, 1970–2009); Digital: 38 (UHF, 2001–2009), 46 (UHF, 2009–2019)
- Former affiliations: PBS (1970–2018); Silent (2018–2019)
- Call sign meaning: Knowledge Network for Central Texas

Technical information
- Licensing authority: FCC
- Facility ID: 9754
- ERP: 1,000 kW
- HAAT: 505.7 m (1,659 ft)
- Transmitter coordinates: 31°19′19.2″N 97°19′3″W

Links
- Public license information: Public file; LMS
- Website: www.kwtx.com/cw12tv/

KNCT (channel 46) is a television station licensed to Belton, Texas, United States, serving as the CW affiliate for Central Texas. It is owned by Gray Media alongside Waco-licensed CBS/Telemundo affiliate KWTX-TV (channel 10) and Bryan-licensed dual CBS/CW affiliate KBTX-TV (channel 3), a semi-satellite of KWTX-TV. KNCT and KWTX-TV share studios on American Plaza in Waco; KNCT's transmitter is located near Moody, Texas.

KNCT serves as the CW affiliate for the western half of the Waco–Temple–Bryan television market, while KBTX-TV's second digital subchannel serves the eastern half.

Until August 31, 2018, KNCT served as the PBS member station for the Waco market, owned by Central Texas College, with studios located at the CTC campus in Killeen.

== History ==
When KNCT signed on in November 1970, it was the sole PBS station for the western portion of the market, with the eastern portion served by Texas A&M's KAMU-TV, which signed on in February 1970. In 1978, KNCT set up a low-powered translator in Waco. The main KNCT signal barely covered Waco, while KAMU's signal just missed it. In 1989, it was upgraded to a full-fledged station, KCTF, which was spun off as a separate station in 1994 and ultimately taken over by Baylor University in 2000 as KWBU-TV. However, in July 2010, KWBU-TV began winding down operations and dropped all PBS programming prior to going off the air entirely on July 31 (it would later become KDYW, whose license was voluntarily canceled in 2012 following a failed attempt to sell the station to Daystar). This left KNCT, once again, as the sole PBS station for the western side of the market. On July 1, KNCT took over KWBU's cable slots on Time Warner Cable (now Charter Spectrum) and Grande Communications, and became available on DirecTV.

As part of the Federal Communications Commission (FCC)'s spectrum repacking, KNCT would have been required to move from RF channel 46 to RF channel 17 for testing starting in January 2020, with completion by March 13, 2020. However, on February 27, 2018, the Central Texas College Board of Trustees voted to close down KNCT due to budgetary concerns relating to the repacking. Central Texas College would have been responsible for 40 percent of the expenses related to the repacking, which would have amounted to $1.6 million in expenses for the college. Combined with the need to replace the station's transmitter, which had been in use since the station signed on, the trustees concluded that it no longer made sense to keep the station on the air. KNCT general manager Max Rudolph said that area cable systems could replace KNCT with KERA-TV from Dallas or KLRU from Austin. Sister radio station KNCT-FM (which was launched the same day as the television station), as well as the college's radio and television broadcasting courses, were not affected by the closure of KNCT television.

Former PBS station logo used from 2015 to 2018.

On June 22, the board voted to shut down the station at midnight on August 31, 2018.

On August 28, 2018, it was reported that the Central Texas College Board of Trustees had voted to assign KNCT's broadcast license to Gray Television, which would create a duopoly with KWTX-TV. This was possible because KNCT broadcasts on a channel not reserved for non-commercial broadcasting. The sale was approved by the FCC on December 12, and it was completed on December 17.

When KNCT went dark three days later, KAMU became the sole PBS member station in the Waco–Temple–Bryan market. Most cable systems on the western side of the market replaced KNCT with Austin's KLRU.

On December 31, 2018, Gray filed an application to move KNCT's transmitter to KWTX's tower outside Moody, Texas. Two days later, on January 2, 2019, Gray Television formally assumed operations of KNCT and made it The CW affiliate for the western half of the market. The CW had aired on KWTX-DT2 since the network launched in September 2006.

== Technical information and subchannels ==
The station's signal is multiplexed:

Subchannels of KNCT
Subchannel	Res.	Short name	Programming
46.1	720p	KNCT-CW	The CW
46.2	480p	OUTLAW	Outlaw
46.3	480p	StartTV	Start TV
46.4	480p	DABL	Dabl
46.5	480p	H&I	Heroes & Icons
46.6	480p	Defy	Defy
46.7	480p	MeToons	MeTV Toons

As a PBS member station, KNCT carried PBS Kids on subchannel 46.2. KNCT would later add Create to 46.3 in July 2010, after the closedown of KWBU-TV. However, KNCT did not offer the Spanish-language V-me network, which was seen on KWBU until that station's closedown.

In coincidence with the station's conversion into a commercial station, on January 2, 2019, KNCT began carrying programming from MeTV on its 46.2 subchannel (with a simulcast on KWTX-TV 10.3, which was concurrently established with the relaunch of KNCT) and Start TV on its 46.3 subchannel.

=== Analog-to-digital conversion ===
KNCT shut down its analog signal, over UHF channel 46, on June 12, 2009, the official date on which full-power television stations in the United States transitioned from analog to digital broadcasts under federal mandate. The station's digital signal relocated from its pre-transition UHF channel 38 to channel 46 for post-transition operation.

== See also ==
- Channel 12 branded TV stations in the United States
- Channel 17 digital TV stations in the United States
- Channel 46 virtual TV stations in the United States
- KNCT-FM
