= Channel 46 virtual TV stations in the United States =

The following television stations operate on virtual channel 46 in the United States:

- K04SB-D in Bakersfield, California
- K12LU-D in West Glacier, etc., Montana
- K15KO-D in Redding, California
- K16MV-D in Redwood Falls, Minnesota
- K17NF-D in Brookings, South Dakota
- K21MV-D in Farmington, New Mexico
- K22GX-D in Tri City, Oregon
- K24MO-D in Tyler, Texas
- K24MX-D in Deming, New Mexico
- K25QA-D in Odessa, Texas
- K27MV-D in Durant, Oklahoma
- K27NF-D in Jackson, Minnesota
- K27NX-D in Ridgecrest, California
- K28MS-D in Bismarck, North Dakota
- K30OK-D in Tulsa, Oklahoma
- K31NA-D in Altus, Oklahoma
- K33MI-D in Aberdeen, South Dakota
- K35GR-D in Badger, South Dakota
- KBPX-LD in Houston, Texas
- KCCF-LD in Atascadero, California
- KDCU-DT in Derby, Kansas
- KDLT-TV in Sioux Falls, South Dakota
- KEXI-LD in Kalispell, Montana
- KFTR-DT in Ontario, California
- KION-TV in Monterey, California
- KNCT in Belton, Texas
- KNMW-LD in Mineral Wells, Texas
- KOCM in Norman, Oklahoma
- KQML-LD in Kansas City, Missouri
- KQVE-LD in San Antonio, Texas
- KRNS-CD in Reno, Nevada
- KTCW in Roseburg, Oregon
- KTLO-LD in Colorado Springs, Colorado
- KUKL-TV in Kalispell, Montana
- KUSE-LD in Seattle, Washington
- KUVE-DT in Green Valley, Arizona
- KUVN-CD in Fort Worth, Texas
- KXTQ-CD in Lubbock, Texas
- W20EH-D in Pownal, etc., Vermont
- W33EI-D in Raleigh, North Carolina
- W34FB-D in Hamilton, Alabama
- W36FK-D in Pittsburgh, Pennsylvania
- W45DN-D in Washington, D.C.
- WALV-CD in Indianapolis, Indiana
- WANF in Atlanta, Georgia
- WBFT-CD in Sanford, North Carolina
- WBGT-CD in Rochester, New York
- WBSF in Bay City, Michigan
- WCTU-LD in Pensacola, Florida
- WHME-TV in South Bend, Indiana
- WIDP in Guayama, Puerto Rico
- WJZY in Belmont, North Carolina
- WKLE in Lexington, Kentucky
- WMBQ-CD in New York, New York
- WPCT in Panama City Beach, FLorida
- WRBU in East St. Louis, Illinois
- WSKG-TV in Binghamton, New York
- WTPX-TV in Antigo, Wisconsin
- WUOA-LD in Birmingham, Alabama
- WWDP in Norwell, Massachusetts
- WWWN-LD in Memphis, Tennessee
- WXCW in Naples, Florida

The following stations, which are no longer licensed, formerly operated on virtual channel 46:

- K35NI-D in Three Forks, Montana
- K46MX-D in Lowry, South Dakota
- KHLU-CD in Honolulu, Hawaii
- KMKI-LD in Cedar Falls, Iowa
- W46EO-D in Culebra, Puerto Rico
- WWEK-LD in Augusta, Georgia
