= Peter Youngren =

Canadian Christian evangelist

Peter Youngren, also known as Peter Ljunggren, is a Canadian Christian evangelist, pastor, and author. He is the founder of World Impact Ministries (WIM), an international Christian organization with outreaches in more than 100 nations. In recognition of his success in Gospel ministry in non-Christian nations, Ministry Today listed Youngren as one of the most influential international evangelists of the 20th century.

== Education ==
Born in 1954 in Sweden as Peter Ljunggren into a missionary family, Youngren relocated to Canada as a teenager. He attended Zion Bible College in Rhode Island, pursuing further education years thereafter at the Florida Christian University, where he obtained a Doctorate of Philosophy in 2001 and an Honorary Degree of Christian Doctor of Philosophy in Business Administration in 2002.

== Personal life ==
Youngren's third wife, Taina Kuusiluoma, assists him in his ministries.

== Festival History ==
Youngren is known for his Friendship Festivals, having conducted them in over 60 nations during the last 35 years. Some of the Friendship Festivals have gathered as many as 600,000 people in a single service - with 16 million new believers having received followup.

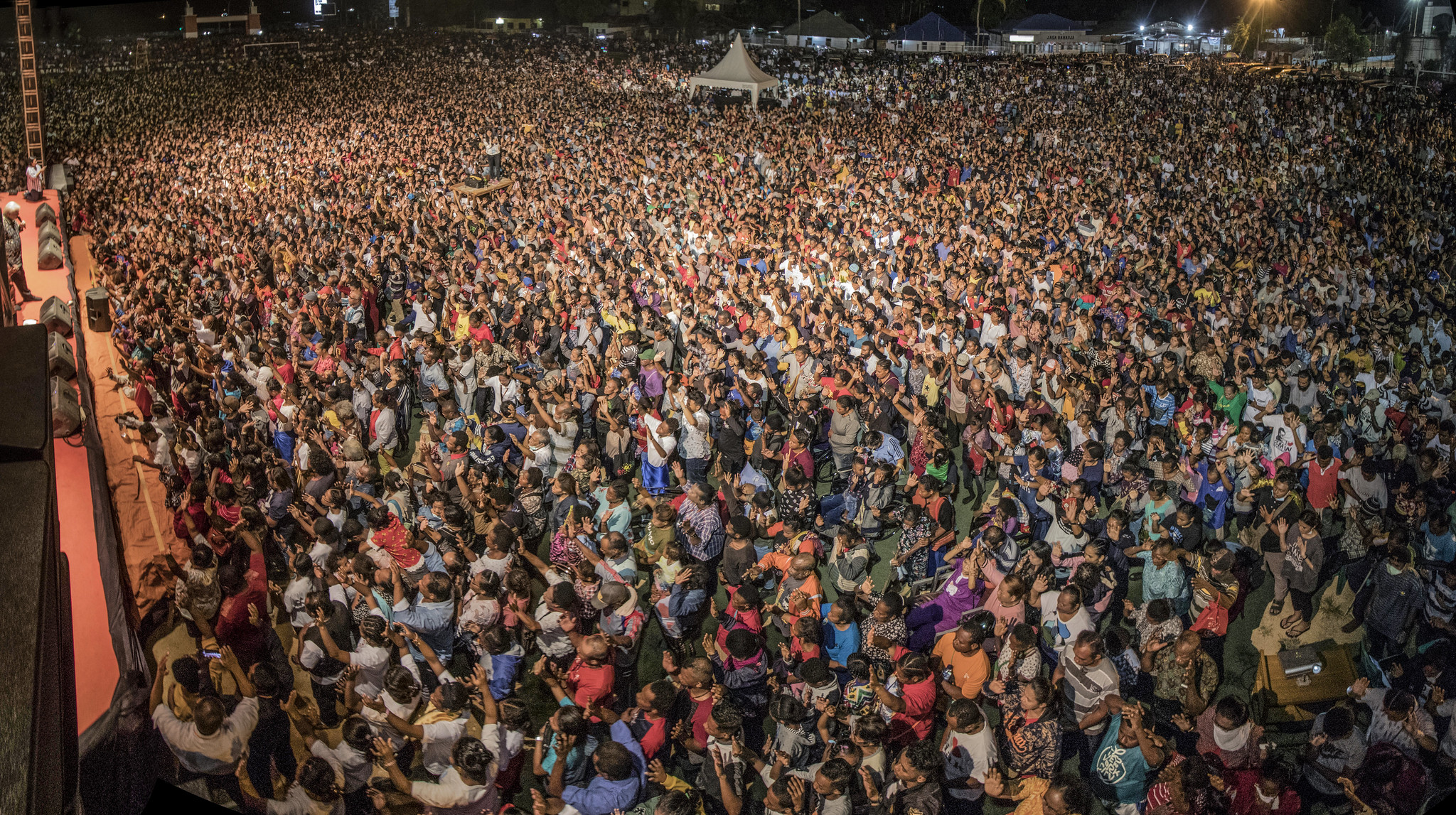
Peter Youngren Festival in Sorong, Indonesia - 2020

In 1990 Youngren held a stadium crusade in the Soviet Union.

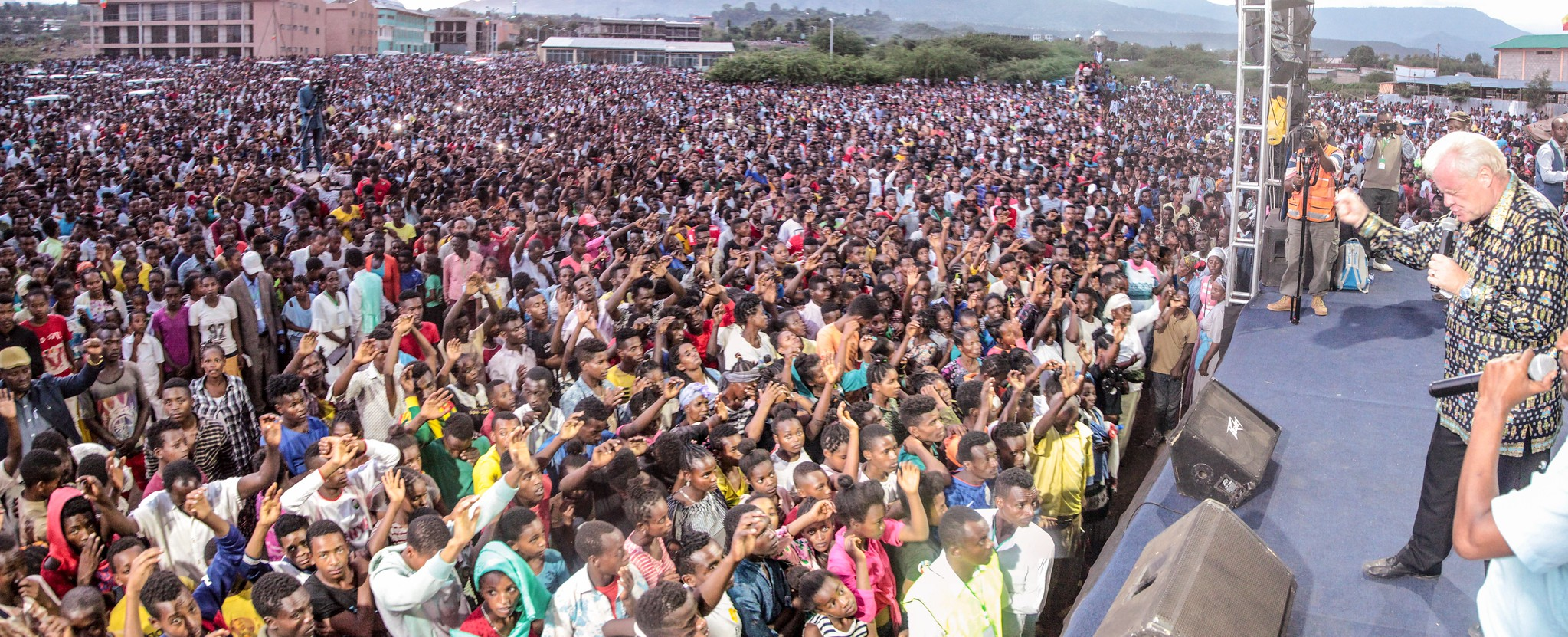
Peter Youngren in Arba Minch, Ethiopia - March 2020

In 1991, around 200,000 people attended Youngren's crusade in the Central Square in Sofia, Bulgaria.

== Professional life ==
Youngren founded World Impact Ministries (WIM) in 1976, while still a student in Rhode Island. Ordained in 1982, he started working in television in 1985. In 1988, he opened the World Impact Bible Institute (WIBI), a small Christian college that began in Niagara Falls, Ontario.

Youngren established the Open Bible Faith Fellowship in 1994. In 2003 Youngren stepped down as president of the Open Bible Faith Fellowship when it was discovered that during his second marriage to RoxAnne Rutkey he had fathered a child in an affair with one of the women in his Niagara congregation. The organization has subsequently severed ties.

In 2000, Youngren and his son, Peter Karl Youngren, established the Toronto International Celebration Church. The church subsequently became the base of the WIBI.

In 2005, Youngren founded Way of Peace, a ministry focused on Israel and the Middle East.

In 2009, Youngren purchased Canada's The Christian Channel, relaunching it as "Grace TV", a name it retained until his partnership with Daystar in 2013 led to its rebranding as Daystar Canada. Currently, his You Are Loved telecast is aired throughout the week across the United States, Canada, India, Indonesia and the Middle East.

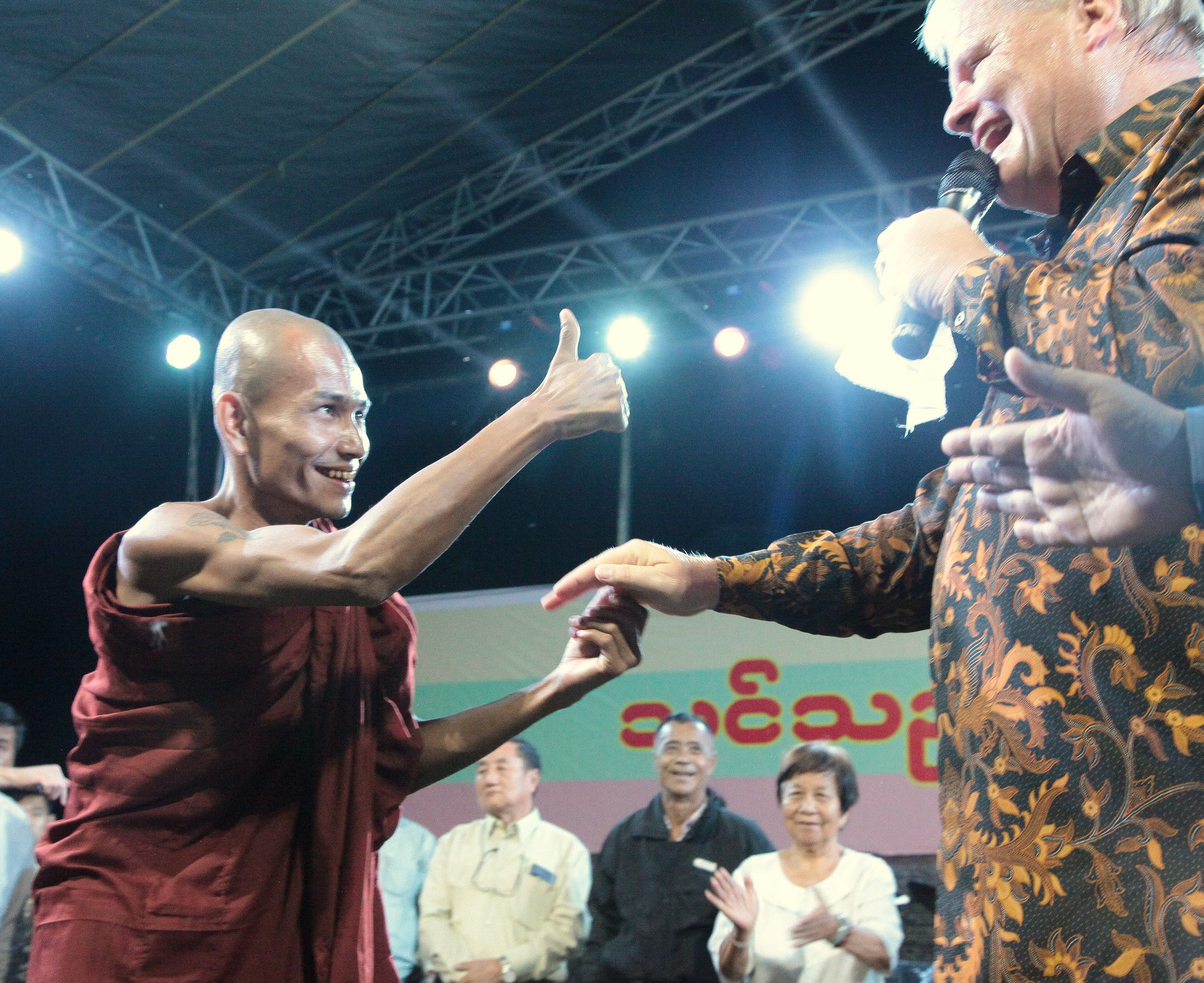

In 2011, Finnish religious organization Evankeliumi Kaikkiin Maihin complained to Finnish police that, after they had suspended Youngren from some activities for his separation from his second wife, Youngren had misappropriated their confidential mailing list and were using it themselves. Youngren countered that he had rights to the list, which he said he had compiled from his own work. In 2013, a Finnish court fined Youngren's third wife Tania Youngren, as WIM's Finnish representative, for using the list without right.

== Books ==
- My Muslim Friends, Celebrate Publications (2006) ISBN 1895868513
- The Faith That Works, Graceworld (2015) ISBN 9781987948004
- Great faith for Great Miracles, Celebrate Jesus International (2004) ISBN 1895868505
- One Sacred Hour, Dominion Media Productions (1994)
- The Sign, Dominion Media Productions (1996) ISBN 1895868122
- You Can Receive Healing from God. Dominion Media (2000) ASIN B0015T143C
- Salvation: God's Gift to You, Dominion Media Productions (1994) ASIN 1895868041
- Fire from Heaven, Dominion Media Productions (1982) ISBN 1895868009
- Blood-Bought Victory, Dominion Media Productions, (1994) ISBN 1895868068
