= WMYT-TV =

Television station in Rock Hill, South Carolina

- Rock Hill, South Carolina; Charlotte, North Carolina; United States
- City: Rock Hill, South Carolina
- Channels: Digital: 25 (UHF), shared with WJZY; Virtual: 55
- Branding: Charlotte CW (Channel 55.1)

Programming
- Affiliations: The CW

Ownership
- Owner: Nexstar Media Group; (Tribune Media Company)
- Sister stations: WJZY; Tegna: WCNC-TV

History
- Founded: December 3, 1992
- First air date: October 21, 1994
- Former call signs: WFVT (1994–2001); WWWB (2001–2006)
- Former channel numbers: Analog: 55 (UHF, 1994–2009); Digital: 39 (UHF, 1999–2018), 47 (UHF, 2018–2019)
- Former affiliations: Independent (1994–1995); The WB (1995–2006); MyNetworkTV (2006–2025)
- Call sign meaning: MyNetworkTV (previous affiliation)

Technical information
- Licensing authority: FCC
- Facility ID: 20624
- ERP: 1,000 kW
- HAAT: 589 m (1,932 ft)
- Transmitter coordinates: 35°21′44.5″N 81°9′18.3″W

Links
- Public license information: Public file; LMS
- Website: qcnews.com/wmyt/

WMYT-TV (channel 55, cable channel 12) is a television station licensed to Rock Hill, South Carolina, United States, serving as the Charlotte, North Carolina, market's outlet for The CW. It is owned by Nexstar Media Group alongside Fox affiliate WJZY (channel 46); Nexstar's Tegna subsidiary owns NBC affiliate WCNC-TV (channel 36). WMYT-TV and WJZY share studios on Performance Road (along I-85) in unincorporated western Mecklenburg County (with a Charlotte mailing address) and broadcast from the same transmitter near Dallas, North Carolina, along the Catawba River.

Channel 55 spent nearly a decade in applications and hearings. Twelve applicants competed for the channel, and different levels of FCC review awarded the construction permit to three different applicants in three consecutive years. After the last winning applicant was unable to build the station, it sold the permit to Family Fifty Five Inc., which put WFVT on the air on October 21, 1994. WJZY, then owned by Capitol Broadcasting Company, supplied WFVT's programming under a local marketing agreement before Capitol acquired it outright in 1999. The station affiliated with The WB upon its launch in January 1995, changing its call sign to WWWB in 2001 to promote its affiliation, and aired a local 10 p.m. newscast between 2000 and 2002.

When The WB and UPN merged to form The CW in 2006, the network affiliated with WJZY, leaving WWWB to affiliate with MyNetworkTV under new WMYT-TV call letters. Fox acquired WJZY and WMYT in 2013 and sold them in 2019 to Nexstar. WMYT became Charlotte's affiliate of The CW on September 1, 2025.

== History ==
=== Application process and construction ===
Channel 55 at Rock Hill, South Carolina, had been used since January 1969 by a translator for the South Carolina Educational Television network. This facility was superseded in 1978 by the launch of WNSC-TV (channel 30).

In 1981, the York County Television Corporation, a subsidiary of the Hi-Ho Television Group, applied to the Federal Communications Commission (FCC) for permission to build a new commercial TV station on channel 55, which remained assigned to Rock Hill. However, the group had to change its application to channel 30—challenging the renewal of WNSC-TV—because of an unusual quirk. Channel 55 was a reserved non-commercial allocation, but the non-commercial WNSC-TV had instead built on the non-reserved channel 30, which had a lower frequency and better signal reach. Two other companies had also expressed interest in building a new commercial station in Rock Hill, and in December 1983, the FCC un-reserved channel 55, opening it to use by a commercial TV station.

By 1985, twelve applicants had filed seeking channel 55, with the FCC placing their proposals into comparative hearing. While each proposed some amount of programming aimed at York County, South Carolina, which contains Rock Hill, observers expected the process to produce an independent station competing for the Charlotte TV market. In alphabetical order by company name, the applicants were:

- The Beverly Hills Hotel Corporation, which owned KOCB in Oklahoma City and KITN in Minneapolis;
- Catawba Communications Inc., headed by the former general manager of KLTV in Tyler, Texas;
- DSL Broadcasting Inc. of Charlotte, North Carolina, presided by the then-president of public television station WTVI;
- Family 55 TV Inc., owned by Diane Wells, a parks and information employee for the city of Rock Hill, as well as partner Jonathan Byrd, and former TV station owner from Indiana;
- Faye Daye Corp. of Columbia, South Carolina, which had station applications pending in multiple states;
- Koontz Communications Limited Partnership, based in Charlotte, with Jim Berry, a Washington, D.C., news anchor, as one of the limited partners;
- Metrolina Media Inc. of Charlotte;
- Moore Broadcast Industries Inc. of Myrtle Beach, South Carolina;
- Susan S. Mulkey of Pensacola, Florida;
- Neisler Limited Partnership, owned by Scott and Janice Neisler, a husband and wife from Kings Mountain, North Carolina;
- Rock Hill Telecasters Associates Ltd., a partnership featuring Robinson Everett and several members of his family; and
- Urban Broadcasting Inc., owned by a woman from High Point, North Carolina.

In May 1987, FCC administrative law judge John Frysiak awarded the permit to Neisler Limited Partnership because Janice Neisler had the most control of any applicant. By this time, the field had narrowed from twelve applicants to seven; three others were either dismissed on technical or financial grounds, while Catawba lost because its general manager did not plan to move to Rock Hill; Wells had too little control of Family 55 TV and Byrd too much; and Koontz Communications had flaws in its limited partnership structure. However, several of the losing applicants disputed Frysiak accepting the claim that Scott Neisler, Janice's husband and 49% owner of their limited partnership, would not be involved. An attorney for Family 55 TV called the idea that a husband-and-wife limited partnership could be run that way "a fantasy". With almost all losing applicants appealing, the case went to the FCC review board, which in February 1988 rendered its decision. It selected Koontz Communications as the best of a bad crop of proposals, noting that it avoided the "questions as to bona fides ... that are unavoidably raised by the machinations of the other applicants".

The matter came before the full commission in 1989, and the commission rendered a third ruling in three years, overturning the 1988 review board decision in favor of Koontz and awarding the permit to Family 55 TV. The ruling was foreseen as having favored Wells for her minority and female status and as a Rock Hill resident. However, the commission's action did not clear the field. Wells was one of six parties with pending applications in January 1990, when George Shinn, owner of the Charlotte Hornets basketball team, announced he had bought out the interests of all six to obtain the channel 55 permit. The Hornets broadcast their games on WCCB-TV (channel 18), but Shinn and WCCB-TV owner Cy Bahakel were in litigation over the latter's stake in the team. The Shinn proposal met with opposition from Bahakel and the United Church of Christ, which sent separate petitions to deny the transfers in May 1990. The Bahakel petition to deny questioned the qualifications of Shinn in his prior business dealings with the Rutledge College group of business schools and with regard to one of his associates, Spencer Stolpen, who was disbarred and had previously given false testimony. The United Church of Christ expressed disfavor with Shinn being allowed to act as a "third-party white knight". The FCC's Mass Media Bureau concurred with Bahakel and the United Church of Christ, recommending the commission deny the application. In November 1990, Shinn withdrew the application because the settlement had been delayed by the petitions to deny; the move came amid reports Shinn was trying to buy another Charlotte-market TV station, WJZY (channel 46).

=== Early years and WB affiliation ===
After the Shinn deal fell apart, Koontz Communications reached a deal to merge with Family 55 TV and Neisler Limited Partnership as part of a settlement agreement. However, Koontz was unable to come up with the $175,000 necessary to buy out the other two applicants after a dispute over attorney fees. Unable to finance the deal, in 1993, Koontz sold the channel 55 permit to Family Fifty Five Inc., headed by Fundamentalist minister Gene Hood. Several companies approached Family Fifty Five about providing programming. Jefferson-Pilot Communications, owner of Charlotte CBS affiliate WBTV, was interested in producing a 10 p.m. newscast, but the company insisted on a more intensive local marketing agreement. In June 1994, it reached such a deal with Capitol Broadcasting Company, owner of WJZY, to run channel 55 (now with the call sign WFVT). WFVT would be mostly programmed by Capitol from the WJZY studios (in Charlotte), and broadcast from that station's tower in Gastonia, though Family Fifty Five would produce limited public-affairs programming.

WFVT began broadcasting on October 21, 1994, as an independent station. Its programming included older movies, classic TV series, and a syndicated package of Southeastern Conference sporting events. Capitol intended that WFVT would be a movies-and-sports outlet, much as WJZY had been positioned; however, WJZY was affiliating with the new UPN network for January 1995. When The WB started up that same month, WFVT became its Charlotte-area affiliate.

WFVT was sold in 1996 from Family Fifty Five to TV 55 LLC, a company owned by H. Wharton Winstead Jr. In December 1999, one month after the FCC began permitting television station duopolies, Capitol purchased WFVT from TV 55 LLC for $4.5 million, creating a legal duopoly with WJZY. The next year, the station began airing a 10 p.m. newscast produced by Charlotte's NBC affiliate, WCNC-TV (channel 36). It was the third such newscast in the market after broadcasts by WCCB and WAXN-TV; it was intended to be compatible with The WB's female-skewing audience by focusing on lifestyle and health segments. It was not successful in the ratings and was canceled effective March 31, 2002. By that time, the station was no longer WFVT; it changed its call sign to WWWB in August 2001 as a tie-in to its network.

=== MyNetworkTV affiliation ===
In 2006, The WB and UPN merged to form The CW. WJZY was among the first stations to commit to the network in early March, and shortly after, Capitol committed WWWB to MyNetworkTV, set up by Fox Television Stations to serve its own ex-UPN outlets and other displaced stations. Ahead of the change, WWWB changed its call sign to WMYT-TV on April 28, 2006, and began branding as "My TV12", using its common channel number on most local cable systems. That same year, over-the-air broadcasts of Charlotte Bobcats basketball moved from WJZY to WMYT, with 15 telecasts a season. All local television rights to the team were acquired by Fox Sports Carolinas for the 2008–09 season.

WMYT began airing a newscast again on April 9, 2012. On that date, the 10 p.m. newscast that WBTV had been producing for WJZY since 2003 moved to WMYT due to a perception that channel 55's audience was more compatible with a newscast. The WBTV News at Ten on My TV 12 ran for 30 minutes, unlike the hourlong format used on WJZY.

On January 14, 2013, Fox Television Stations entered into an agreement to acquire WJZY and WMYT from Capitol Broadcasting for $18 million. The sale resulted in the Fox affiliation in Charlotte moving from WCCB to WJZY. Since WJZY was not ready to go with its own news department, the WBTV-produced newscast moved back to channel 46 on July 1, when the affiliation switch occurred; it was discontinued altogether the day prior to the January 1, 2014, launch of WJZY's news department.

Fox Television Stations sold the spectrum of WMYT in the 2017 broadcast incentive spectrum auction and received $46.4 million for the station's channel. Beginning June 6, 2018, WJZY began broadcasting from its transmitter.

In 2019, Fox agreed to sell WJZY and WMYT to Nexstar Media Group in a $45 million acquisition.

=== CW affiliation ===
In 2025, Nexstar Media Group announced in an earnings release that WMYT would become an owned-and-operated station of The CW on September 1, 2025.

== Subchannels ==
WJZY and WMYT-TV broadcast from a tower north of Dallas, North Carolina.

Subchannels of WJZY and WMYT-TV
License	Subchannel	Res.	Short name	Programming
WJZY	46.1	720p	WJZY-HD	Fox
WJZY	46.3	480i	CHARGE	Charge!
WJZY	46.4	480i	Grit	Grit
WJZY	46.5	480i	ShopLC	Shop LC
WJZY	46.6	480i	ION	Ion
WJZY	46.7	480i	ANTENNA	Antenna TV
WJZY	46.8	480i	REWIND	Rewind TV
WMYT-TV	55.1	720p	WMYT-HD	The CW

== See also ==
- Channel 12 branded TV stations in the United States
- Channel 25 digital TV stations in the United States
- Channel 55 virtual TV stations in the United States
- List of television stations in South Carolina
