= Nick Kosir =

American meteorologist (born 1983)

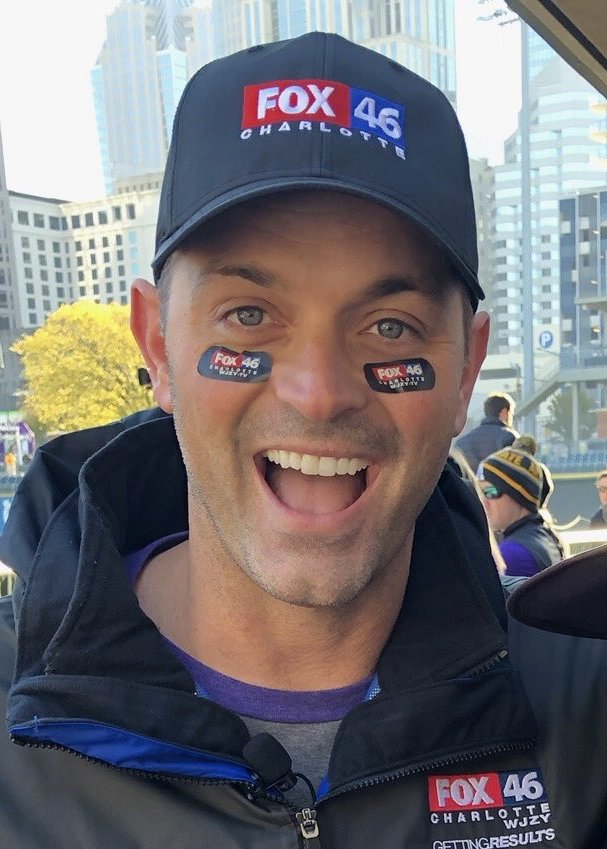
- Kosir in 2019.
- Born: October 7, 1983 (age 42); Cleveland, Ohio, U.S.
- Education: University of Akron, Mississippi State University
- Occupations: Weather presenter; TikToker
- Employer: Fox Weather
- Children: 1

Nick Kosir (born October 7, 1983) is an American television meteorologist. He is known for his dancing videos online, hitting 5 million followers on TikTok as of September 2022. Kosir signed on to join the Fox Weather channel which launched on October 25, 2021.

== Education ==
Kosir was born and raised in Cleveland, Ohio. He earned a bachelor of arts in communicational organization from the University of Akron. He earned a certificate in broadcast meteorology from Mississippi State University.

== Career ==
Kosir worked as a reporter and part-time weather forecaster at WMFD-TV in Mansfield, Ohio and later became the weather director. In October 2008, he began working as a morning meteorologist on KBTV-TV in Beaumont, Texas. While there, he became known as "The Rapping Weatherman". Kosir worked for three years at KMVT in Twin Falls, Idaho.

For seven years he worked for WJZY Fox 46 in Charlotte, North Carolina, where employees are encouraged to post on social media daily. Kosir began by making skits with his best friend Hans and eventually imitating Cam Newton.

== Personal life ==
Kosir lives in New York City with his wife and son. Kosir is of Slovenian descent.
