= Channel 12 branded TV stations in the United States =

The following television stations in the United States brand as channel 12 (though neither using virtual channel 12 or broadcasting on physical RF channel 12):

- KNCT in Belton, Texas
- KTVZ-DT2 in Bend, Oregon
- WMYT-TV in Rock Hill, South Carolina
- KPYX in San Francisco, California

The following television stations in the United States formerly branded as channel 14:

- KGNS-DT2 in Laredo, Texas
