= Daystar Television Canada =

Canadian religious TV channel

- Country: Canada
- Broadcast area: National
- Headquarters: Vancouver, British Columbia

Programming
- Picture format: 480i (SDTV)

Ownership
- Owner: World Impact Ministries (branding licensed from Word of God Fellowship)

History
- Launched: October 1, 2005
- Former names: The Christian Channel (2005-2009); Grace TV (2009-2013)

Links
- Website: canada.daystar.com

Daystar Television Canada is a Canadian specialty channel that broadcasts Religious programming dedicated to the Christian faith.

It is owned by World Media Ministries.

Originally known as The Christian Channel from 2005 to 2009, it was re-branded as Grace TV in September 2009. As of June 2013, the majority of its programming became sourced from the U.S. Evangelical Christian network Daystar Television, and the network ultimately took on the Daystar brand in November 2013.

== History ==
Logo used under The Christian Channel brand.

The channel was launched on October 1, 2005 as The Christian Channel by previous owners S-VOX.

On January 26, 2009, S-VOX announced that it had reached an agreement to sell the Christian Channel to World Impact Ministries. The sale was subject to Canadian Radio-television and Telecommunications Commission (CRTC) approval. It was approved by the CRTC on May 4, 2009. World Impact Ministries took control of the channel on June 1, 2009 and introduced new programming including eNcounter- its flagship program airing daily. The channel was renamed Grace TV on September 16, 2009.

Logo used under the Grace TV brand.

In May 2013, Grace TV entered into a partnership with the U.S. based religious broadcaster Daystar Television, in which the majority of Grace TV's programming would come from Daystar, with the remaining 35% provided by Canadian producers. On November 23, 2013, the network announced that it would drop the Grace TV name in favor of branding as Daystar full-time.

== High-definition feed ==
A high-definition feed will be launched first by Shaw Direct on 4 September 2019.

== See also ==
- Televangelism
