= Joni Lamb =

American television evangelist (1960–2026)

- Born: Joni Trammell; July 19, 1960; Colleyville, Texas, U.S.
- Died: May 7, 2026 (aged 65); Bedford, Texas, U.S.
- Occupation: Christian broadcaster
- Spouses: Marcus Lamb (m. 1982; died 2021) Doug Weiss (m. 2023)
- Children: 3

Ecclesiastical career
- Church: Christianity (Pentecostal)
- Congregations: Co-founder of Daystar Television Network
- Offices held: President of Daystar Network

Joni Lamb (née Trammell; July 19, 1960 – May 7, 2026) was an American Christian broadcaster who was the co-founder, president, and executive producer of the Daystar Television Network. She began to be involved in Christian television starting in the mid-1980s, and became known for her work with her first husband, Marcus Lamb, with Daystar.

== Early life ==
Joni Trammell was born in Colleyville, Texas, on July 19, 1960, and grew up in Greenville, South Carolina. Her family were members of the Tremont Avenue Church of God where Marcus Lamb ministered as a visiting preacher during a revival. They met at her home church and married two years later in 1982. They traveled for the next few years, visiting churches as evangelists.

== Career ==
In 1984, Joni and Marcus Lamb settled in Montgomery, Alabama, where they purchased a full power television station and began teaching the Bible on broadcast television the following year on WMCF-TV, called 45 Alive. That continued until they sold the station 1990. They moved to Dallas, starting a station in a larger Texas market. In 1993, they had raised enough money to purchase the defunct station KMPX-TV 29. Five years later, the station was renamed Daystar Television Network.

=== Joni Table Talk ===
Lamb hosted her self-titled half-hour program Joni Table Talk (initially titled Joni) each weekday on Daystar. The format of the show was typically a round table discussion with other ministers, singers, and celebrities discussing a wide range of topics which combined contemporary cultural issues and the Christian faith. In 2004, the show was given an award as the Best Television Talk Show by the National Religious Broadcasters.

=== Ministry Now! ===
Lamb co-hosted the Daystar flagship program Ministry Now! (previously called Marcus and Joni and initially titled Celebration). The hour-long program was broadcast five days a week on Daystar. Joni's children shared host duties and discussed news related to the network, ministry, and topics of interest to Christians with a daily guest or personalities.

=== On-air comments ===
Lamb generated controversy for some on-air comments during her career. She said, "thousands" of people "have come out of homosexuality" and "may be (among) the most discriminated people in the world today." She said homosexuality is "ungodly" and "God cannot bless you and you cannot fulfill your destiny while you are operating within the realm of homosexuality."

In 2012, Lamb said, "if you live in America and you understand that we are a Christian society then you can't be offended [by people's right to free speech], or you shouldn't live here." She spoke on her television program about being against vaccinations and spoke out about what she believed was voter fraud during the 2020 presidential election.

In 2024, Lamb's son Jonathan accused her of covering up a family member's alleged sexual assault of Jonathan's then-5-year-old daughter. Joni fired her son from Daystar Network days before the allegations became public. Afterwards, her relationship with her son became strained.

== Personal life and death ==
Joni and Marcus Lamb had three children: Jonathan Lamb, Rachel Lamb Brown, and Rebecca Lamb Weiss. In 2010, Marcus admitted to having an extramarital affair. On November 30, 2021, Marcus died from complications of COVID-19 due to co-morbidities at age 64. Her son Jonathan had previously worked in leadership roles at Daystar, and his wife, Suzy Lamb, also worked in Christian media.

Jonathan would not be a featured speaker at Lamb's public memorial service.

On June 10, 2023, Joni Lamb married Doug Weiss. Weiss is a television co-host, author, and psychologist and he became Joni's co-host on Daystar. At the time of her death, Lamb owned four houses (hers and possibly each of her children's homes) in Texas, a home in Georgia and a beach condominium in Miramar Beach, Florida. Weiss was previously married and was divorced before beginning a friendship with Lamb which led to them falling in love and marrying in June of 2023. However, conflicting accounts of Doug and Joni’s relationship timeline are in question, and some believe Doug ended his marriage in order to pursue Joni Lamb. At the time of her death, her net worth was estimated at $40 million.

Lamb died from complications of metastatic bone cancer, at her home in Bedford, Texas, on May 7, 2026, with additional complications due to an earlier back injury.
