= KNCT-FM =

- Killeen, Texas; United States
- Broadcast area: Killeen–Temple–Waco–Austin
- Frequency: 91.3 MHz
- Branding: Simply Beautiful 91.3

Programming
- Format: Easy listening; public radio
- Affiliations: AP Radio

Ownership
- Owner: Central Texas College

History
- First air date: November 23, 1970
- Call sign meaning: Knowledge Network for Central Texas

Technical information
- Licensing authority: FCC
- Facility ID: 9977
- Class: C1
- ERP: 50,000 watts
- HAAT: 357 meters (1,171 ft)
- Transmitter coordinates: 30°59′12″N 97°37′47″W

Links
- Public license information: Public file; LMS
- Webcast: Listen live
- Website: www.knct.org

KNCT-FM (91.3 MHz) is a public FM radio station licensed to Killeen, Texas, United States, and owned by Central Texas College. The station broadcasts an easy listening format branded as Simply Beautiful 91.3, along with local news, public affairs programming, and community features. The studios and offices are located on the campus of Central Texas College in Killeen. The transmitter is located on Eagle Nest Road in Harker Heights.

KNCT-FM broadcasts in the HD Radio format. Its HD2 subchannel carries a classical music format. KNCT-FM is listener-supported and operates as a noncommercial educational station.

KNCT-FM's 50,000 watt signal covers much of Central Texas, including the Killeen–Temple and Waco radio markets, as well as portions of the Austin market. The station is available through online streaming via its official website and mobile app. KNCT-FM also maintains MyKNCT, a digital content platform featuring station news, community features, and on-demand program content.

== Programming ==
KNCT-FM broadcasts an easy listening format branded as Simply Beautiful, featuring instrumental selections, soft adult contemporary music, and adult standards. In addition to music programming, the station airs local news, public affairs programming, educational features, and community-interest segments. KNCT-FM's HD2 subchannel carries a full-time classical music format.

The station's weekday programming includes locally produced news and public affairs segments, along with national and regional news updates. KNCT-FM also carries specialty music and spoken-word programming as part of its public service mission. Supplemental station content, including articles, community features, and archived program material, is published through the station's digital platform, MyKNCT.

== History ==
KNCT-FM first signed on the air on November 23, 1970. When KNCT-FM first went on the air, it aired an educational format as part of Central Texas College's service to the community. Over time, KNCT-FM adopted a beautiful music format in response to commercial easy listening stations shifting to more contemporary music formats.

In later years, KNCT-FM expanded its programming to include digital streaming, HD Radio broadcasting, and additional public affairs and community programming, while continuing its role as a noncommercial public radio service for Central Texas.

In June 2019, KNCT-FM named Michelle Flores as the station's general manager. Flores was the first woman to lead the station in its nearly 50-year history.

KNCT-FM had a co-owned television station, KNCT (channel 46), which was a PBS member station. The television station signed on the same day as the radio station and served Central Texas for 47 years. Financial pressures forced Central Texas College to take the station dark in August 2018; it was subsequently sold to Gray Television and became Central Texas's The CW affiliate. KNCT-FM's operations were not affected by the television station's closure and sale.

== See also ==
- KNCT (TV)
