= Marcus Lamb =

American televangelist (1957–2021)

- Born: October 7, 1957; Cordele, Georgia, U.S.
- Died: November 30, 2021 (aged 64); Bedford, Texas, U.S.
- Education: Lee College
- Occupations: Televangelist, prosperity theologian, minister, Christian broadcaster, anti-vaccine advocate
- Spouse: Joni Trammell (m. 1982)
- Children: 3

Ecclesiastical career
- Church: Christianity (Pentecostal)
- Congregations: Word of God Fellowship, Montgomery, Alabama
- Offices held: Co-founder, CEO, and president of Daystar Network

Marcus Daron Lamb (October 7, 1957 – November 30, 2021) was an American televangelist, minister, Christian broadcaster, and anti-vaccine advocate. He was the co-founder, president, and CEO of the Daystar Television Network, which in 2010 claimed to be the second-largest Christian television network in the world, with a claimed book value of US$230 million. Lamb died in late 2021 after contracting COVID-19.

== Early life ==
Lamb was born October 7, 1957, in Cordele, Georgia, and raised in Macon, Georgia. He became a Christian at the age of five and continued in church attendance and work as he grew older. He began to preach as an evangelist at age fifteen.

He graduated from high school and enrolled at age sixteen in Lee University (then known as Lee College), a Christian university based in Cleveland, Tennessee. He graduated three years later. In 1982, four years after graduation, he married Joni Trammell of Greenville, South Carolina.

The couple spent their early years of marriage as traveling evangelists, visiting churches in the Southeast to teach the gospel. Marcus was ordained as a bishop with the Church of God of Cleveland, Tennessee.

== Media ministry ==
In 1980, the same year that Marcus met his wife Joni, he founded The Word of God Fellowship, the company that would eventually start the Daystar Television Network. In 1985 Lamb began WMCF-TV in Montgomery, Alabama, the first Christian television station in Alabama. The Lambs sold the station to Trinity Broadcasting Network (TBN) for enough to cover its debts and moved to Dallas, Texas. Lamb launched the Daystar network at the end of 1997.

Lamb's Daystar TV applied for and was granted a loan under the 2020 United States government Paycheck Protection Program (PPP) to help pay employees' salaries during restrictions due to the COVID-19 pandemic; it received $3.9 million. Soon after receiving the funds, the church purchased a 1997 14-seat Gulfstream V aircraft worth $8–10 million. In December 2020, Daystar TV paid back the loan with interest after the television show Inside Edition investigated the purchase of the aircraft, which had been used for Lamb family vacations.

During the pandemic, Lamb and Daystar preached an anti-vaccine message, hosting many anti-vaccine activists such as Robert F. Kennedy Jr. and Del Bigtree, and posting on the Daystar website that vaccines are the "most dangerous thing" for children. When Lamb fell ill with COVID-19, his son called the infection "a spiritual attack from the enemy."

== Personal life ==
Lamb and his wife lived in Dallas; the couple had three children. In November 2010, Lamb admitted on the Daystar Network that he had an extramarital affair that had ended several years before. He and his wife sought the help of spiritual counselors.

On the advice of their counselors, the decision was made to keep this matter private as long as they could to heal adequately. The Lambs decided to publicly disclose the infidelity shortly after they claimed that three women asked for US $7.5 million in exchange for silence on the matter.

The Lambs shared their story publicly on television and refused to pay anything. No criminal charges were filed, although civil suits and counter-suits between Daystar and the three former employees were filed over the matter. By December 2011, all three employee claims had either been dropped or dismissed. Daystar subsequently dismissed its countersuits against each of the women.

== Death ==
Lamb died from COVID-19 complications in Bedford, Texas on November 30, 2021. He was diabetic.

He had said he had been taking ivermectin, an antiparasitic medication that does not protect against or treat COVID-19, but which was widely promoted as a quack remedy by disinformation proponents.

== See also ==
- COVID-19 pandemic in Texas
- Vaccination and religion
