= KWBU-FM =

- Waco, Texas; United States
- Broadcast area: Waco, Texas
- Frequency: 103.3 MHz
- Branding: 103.3 KWBU

Programming
- Format: Public radio; news/talk, classical, jazz
- Affiliations: National Public Radio

Ownership
- Owner: Baylor University; (Brazos Valley Public Broadcasting Foundation)

History
- First air date: March 15, 1966
- Former call signs: KWBU (1965–2000)
- Former frequencies: 89.9 MHz (1966–1968); 107.1 MHz (1968–2001)
- Call sign meaning: Waco Baylor University

Technical information
- Licensing authority: FCC
- Facility ID: 4124
- Class: A
- ERP: 3,200 watts
- HAAT: 138 meters (453 ft)
- Transmitter coordinates: 31°30′51.6″N 97°11′45″W

Links
- Public license information: Public file; LMS
- Webcast: Listen live
- Website: www.kwbu.org

KWBU-FM (103.3 MHz), is a public non-commercial FM radio station in Waco, Texas, serving the greater Brazos Valley region. It has studios on River Street in Waco. The station's Federal Communications Commission license is held by the Brazos Valley Public Broadcasting Foundation, a nonprofit community organization. Baylor University has a majority of votes on the foundation board.

Many shows come from National Public Radio (NPR), with Central Texas news and information updates. There are also blocks of classical music in late mornings and evenings, with jazz shows on weekends. The BBC World Service is heard overnight.

KWBU went on the air in 1966 as Baylor University's college radio station. It was transferred to the Brazos Valley Public Broadcasting Foundation and relaunched as an NPR station in 2000.

== History ==
KWBU first signed on March 15, 1966, originally on 89.9 MHz. In 1968, it moved to 107.1 MHz (now the location for regional Mexican music station KLZT). In its first decades, KWBU was the student-run college radio station at Baylor University.

The station, which had been a mixture of classical music and adult album alternative, joined NPR on July 1, 2000; before then, Waco had been the largest radio market in the nation without an NPR station. The KWBU license was concurrently transferred from Baylor University to the Brazos Valley Public Broadcasting Foundation. The station moved to 103.3 MHz on June 10, 2001. In 2003, KWBU-FM was the first radio station in Waco to broadcast an HD radio signal.

When sister PBS member station KWBU-TV closed its doors in 2010 due to budget shortfalls, KWBU-FM remained in operation. Historically, both stations had been plagued by low community support. While they were technically community licensees, Baylor's controlling stake in the Brazos Valley Public Broadcasting Foundation led to the perception that they were "Baylor stations", tamping down the support needed to keep the television station on the air. At the time of KWBU-TV's shutdown, the stations only had 1,600 members, a very low number even for a market as small as Waco and nowhere near what the foundation felt was necessary to keep the television station on the air. KWBU-FM was far less expensive to run; it operated with just under half the television side's operating budget.

On March 7, 2025, Baylor University announced that it would no longer fund KWBU-FM's operations; it continues to provide office space and back-end services to the station. KWBU stated that the loss of Baylor's funding would cost the station $200,000, representing 20 percent of its budget.

== Limited signal ==
KWBU-FM originally operated on 107.1 MHz at 2,750 watts from a 492-foot (150 m) tower near Hewitt. Now located at 103.3 MHz, it boosted its power to 3,200 watts from a 453-foot (138 m) tower near Texas State Highway 6 across from Richland Mall in Waco in May 2014. This is still fairly modest for a full NPR member on the FM band, especially compared to other Texas NPR stations such as KUT in Austin or KERA in Dallas, which are powered at a full 100,000 watts. The lower power helps protect KSSM in Copperas Cove, located at adjacent 103.1 FM. As a result, the station's signal does not make it too far out of McLennan County. Some of Waco's close-in suburbs in McLennan County only get a grade B signal. In some communities on the outskirts of Waco, listeners tune in to KUT or KERA for NPR programming.
