= WJZY =

Television station in Belmont, North Carolina

- Belmont–Charlotte, North Carolina; United States
- City: Belmont, North Carolina
- Channels: Digital: 25 (UHF), shared with WMYT-TV; Virtual: 46
- Branding: Queen City News

Programming
- Affiliations: 46.1: Fox; for others, see § Technical information and subchannels

Ownership
- Owner: Nexstar Media Group; (Tribune Media Company)
- Sister stations: WMYT-TV; Tegna: WCNC-TV

History
- First air date: March 9, 1987
- Former channel numbers: Analog: 46 (UHF, 1987–2009); Digital: 47 (UHF, 1999–2019)
- Former affiliations: Independent (1987–1995); UPN (1995–2006); The CW (2006–2013)
- Call sign meaning: Original owner wanted "J" and "Z" in calls to differentiate in the market

Technical information
- Licensing authority: FCC
- Facility ID: 73152
- ERP: 1,000 kW
- HAAT: 553.5 m (1,816 ft)
- Transmitter coordinates: 35°21′44.5″N 81°9′18.3″W

Links
- Public license information: Public file; LMS
- Website: qcnews.com

WJZY (channel 46) is a television station licensed to Belmont, North Carolina, United States, serving as the Fox affiliate for the Charlotte area. It is owned by Nexstar Media Group alongside CW outlet WMYT-TV (channel 55); Nexstar's Tegna subsidiary owns NBC affiliate WCNC-TV (channel 36). WJZY and WMYT-TV share studios on Performance Road (along I-85) in unincorporated western Mecklenburg County (with a Charlotte mailing address) and broadcast from the same transmitter near Dallas, North Carolina, along the Catawba River.

A merged group including Charlotte mayor Harvey Gantt obtained the construction permit from a field of as many as nine applicants in 1985. Gantt's involvement in the firm was not initially publicly disclosed, creating an ethical scandal that contributed to his losing re-election. The station began broadcasting on March 9, 1987. Capitol Broadcasting Company obtained a minority stake in the firm and bought the entirety of channel 46 later that year. WJZY was a competitive independent station to Charlotte's original Fox affiliate, WCCB (channel 18), and the broadcast home of Charlotte Hornets basketball from 1992 to 1998. The station affiliated with UPN in 1995 and The CW in 2006.

Fox Television Stations purchased WJZY in 2013, giving the network an owned-and-operated station in Charlotte, a market it coveted due to the presence of the Carolina Panthers football team. In time for the station to become the Fox affiliate in 2014, a news department was started; previously, WJZY had carried newscasts produced under contract by WBTV on three occasions. WJZY's newscasts originally had an alternative structure oriented toward younger viewers but struggled in the ratings and soon adopted a more conventional format. Nexstar acquired WJZY from Fox in 2020 and relaunched its news department under the brand Queen City News. The station produces 11 1/2 hours of local programming a day and is the television home of Panthers preseason football.

== History ==
=== Early history ===
In December 1983, the Federal Communications Commission (FCC) assigned UHF channel 46 to Belmont, North Carolina, near Gastonia. Nine groups applied for the channel; one group, Piedmont Crescent Broadcasting Company, included Charlotte mayor Harvey Gantt and officials associated with local radio station WPEG and its owner, the Suburban Radio Group. Another applicant, Metro Broadcasting, consisted of Charlotte dentist Spurgeon Webber and Winston-Salem attorney David Wagner. Metro and Piedmont Crescent merged to form Metro-Crescent Broadcasting, which settled with the other applicants and was awarded the construction permit. Originally, the station received the call sign WMHU. Capitol Broadcasting Company of Raleigh reached a deal in February 1986 to buy a 49-percent stake in Metro-Crescent, with an option to purchase the remainder once the station started; to do so, it had to divest itself of two Charlotte-market radio stations to meet FCC rules on multiple station ownership. The sale stood to make the partners, including Gantt, about $3 million (equivalent to $7.46 million in 2025); Gantt told Charlotte city council that he had violated city ethics policy in failing to disclose his stake in the firm among his business holdings, as required, in 1985 and 1986. Before the station went on the air, the call sign was changed to WJZY in November 1986 in order to differentiate the new channel 46 from other Charlotte television stations, none of which had a "J" or "Z" in their call signs.

WJZY, originally an independent station, made its first broadcast on March 9, 1987, testing its transmitter with a limited schedule of movies. It began full commercial operations in July, airing off-network syndicated shows, movies, and first-run cartoons. The full launch was accelerated to the start of July as an aid to cable companies such as Cablevision of Charlotte, who dropped out-of-town stations to carry WJZY. It was the first full-market Charlotte station since WCTU-TV (channel 36, now WCNC-TV) launched in July 1967.

Capitol exercised its option to buy the remainder of WJZY months after it signed on; a group petitioned against the sale, claiming Metro–Crescent had trafficked in the permit and reneged on its promises for local programming. The challenge was dropped, and the sale was approved by the FCC in November. By that time, Gantt's stake had been an issue in his run for re-election; he lost in a close race to Sue Myrick and admitted that her statements on Metro–Crescent may have swung the race for her.

By 1990, channel 46 was even in the ratings with WCCB (channel 18), the Fox affiliate, in key dayparts. In 1994, Capitol reached a deal to provide nearly all the programming of a new Charlotte-market TV station—WFVT (channel 55), licensed to Rock Hill, South Carolina—under a local marketing agreement (LMA) with its owner, Family Fifty Five.

=== UPN and CW affiliation ===
WJZY became a charter affiliate of the United Paramount Network (UPN) when the network launched on January 16, 1995; WFVT joined The WB at the same time. By 2006, WJZY was tied with WUPA, UPN's station in Atlanta, as the network's fifth highest-rated station.

WJZY served as the over-the-air home of the NBA's Charlotte Hornets from 1992 to 1998; the last two seasons were shared with WFVT. When the Hornets returned as the Charlotte Bobcats in 2004, WJZY served as the team's over-the-air flagship until the telecasts moved to WMYT in 2006.

On January 24, 2006, Time Warner and CBS Corporation announced that The WB and UPN would shut down, to be replaced by a merged network known as The CW that September. On March 1, WJZY was announced as the Charlotte-area affiliate of The CW, making it one of the first five stations outside of the core Tribune Company and CBS Television Stations groups to agree to carry the new network. WJZY affiliated with The CW upon the network's debut on September 18, 2006. Later that week, channel 55 signed with MyNetworkTV.

=== Sale to Fox Television Stations and switch to Fox ===
On January 14, 2013, Fox Television Stations entered into an agreement to acquire WJZY and WMYT from Capitol Broadcasting for $18 million, which was announced on January 28. Jack Abernathy, president of Fox Television Stations, noted that the company was interested in buying a station in a growing market that was home to a National Football Conference (NFC) team, the Carolina Panthers; Fox owns the rights to telecast most NFC games. After receiving FCC approval, the deal was consummated on April 17, 2013.

The Fox affiliation moved to WJZY on July 1, 2013; the station branded as "Fox 46 Carolinas" in a reflection of its two-state coverage area. CW programming moved to WCCB.

=== Nexstar ownership ===
On November 5, 2019, Fox Corporation announced that WJZY and WMYT-TV would be acquired by Nexstar Media Group for $45 million in a deal concurrent with Fox buying KCPQ and KZJO in Seattle and WITI in Milwaukee from Nexstar. Nexstar stated that WJZY and WMYT were "geographically complementary" to its existing properties in the Southeastern United States. The sale was completed on March 2, 2020.

WJZY replaced WSOC-TV and WAXN-TV as the preseason television broadcaster and "official station" of Carolina Panthers football ahead of the 2022 season. The five-year contract also includes the production of a variety of Panthers-related programming, including pre- and postgame shows.

== News operation ==
=== News share agreements ===
Three times between 1994 and 2013, WJZY aired 10 p.m. local newscasts produced for it by Charlotte CBS affiliate WBTV (channel 3). The first newscast, WBTV News at 10 on WJZY, debuted on May 30, 1994, as the first of two prime-time newscasts to start in the market within several weeks; it was quietly launched weeks before a competing newscast from WSOC-TV debuted on WCCB. In June 1995, the newscast ended when WBTV moved it to public television station WTVI (channel 42).

WBTV relaunched a newscast for WJZY in September 2003. This newscast rated third behind 10 p.m. newscasts aired by WCCB and WAXN-TV (from WSOC-TV); the low ratings for the program on WJZY and a more "news-friendly audience" on its sister station were cited as the reason for its move to WJZY's duopoly partner WMYT-TV in April 2012.

WJZY also aired the statewide weekly public affairs program NC Spin and produced the local public affairs show Charlotte Now with Mike Collins, which was discontinued following its June 30, 2013, edition, one day before the official switch to Fox.

=== Building a newsroom ===
With Fox's purchase of the WJZY/WMYT duopoly, Fox built a standalone news department for WJZY. In the meantime, WBTV's 10 p.m. production returned to WJZY from WMYT when channel 46 officially joined Fox on July 1, 2013. While initial reports suggested that Fox would move WJZY/WMYT to the facility in Charlotte's University City section used by Speed, it was instead decided to heavily renovate and expand the Performance Road studio to accommodate the news department. WJZY soft-launched its news operation on December 18, 2013, by livestreaming rehearsals on its website.

WJZY's local news service debuted on-air on January 1, 2014, with the premiere of a nightly hour-long 10 p.m. newscast titled MyFox Carolinas Primetime. The newscast adopted an alternative format designed to target younger viewers, with the anchor roaming the newsroom; it bore characteristics of the Chasing New Jersey program aired by Fox-owned WWOR-TV in Secaucus, New Jersey, but was more conventional. Jack Abernethy, the head of Fox Television Stations, felt that "when you're not being held by an existing show, it's much easier to do things differently". WJZY also operated five bureaus in Charlotte's outer suburbs staffed by reporters living in those communities to bolster its regional emphasis.

WJZY expanded its news operation in late June with the introduction of a 6 p.m. newscast, followed by the August 25 introduction of the station's morning show, Good Day Carolinas, which Mark Washburn of The Charlotte Observer described as being "more of a sofa-and-coffee-table production" than its competitors. Despite having the highly viewed Fox primetime lineup as its lead-in, the station continued to lose viewers at 10 p.m. to WAXN and WCCB, while the station's morning news was in fifth place among Charlotte stations. The newsroom had high turnover among its staff. By June 2015, WJZY had begun shifting back towards a traditional format; Washburn, who noted that viewers were turned away by the station's initial newscasts of "amateurish quality", found the station had "retreated to the formula it once mocked: chasing fire trucks and illustrating the police scanner". On December 21, 2021, the station announced it would change its news brand to Queen City News, which took effect in January 2022. The move came after Nexstar concluded that WJZY had no real brand, with viewers often confusing it with Fox News Channel. By September 2023, WCCB still had higher ratings in total households and among viewers aged 25–54 than WJZY at 10 p.m., though WJZY had expanded its local output to 11 1/2 hours a day on weekdays.

Nick Kosir worked for WJZY for seven years as the morning meteorologist. He was best known for humorous Instagram photos and later for dance videos. He had over 2 million followers on social media when he announced in April 2021 that he was leaving WJZY and moving to Fox Weather.

== Technical information and subchannels ==
WJZY and WMYT-TV broadcast from a tower north of Dallas, North Carolina.

Subchannels of WJZY and WMYT-TV
License	Subchannel	Res.	Short name	Programming
WJZY	46.1	720p	WJZY-HD	Fox
WJZY	46.3	480i	CHARGE	Charge!
WJZY	46.4	480i	Grit	Grit
WJZY	46.5	480i	ShopLC	Shop LC
WJZY	46.6	480i	ION	Ion
WJZY	46.7	480i	ANTENNA	Antenna TV
WJZY	46.8	480i	REWIND	Rewind TV
WMYT-TV	55.1	720p	WMYT-HD	The CW

=== Analog-to-digital conversion ===
WJZY began broadcasting a digital signal on May 14, 2002, on UHF channel 47. It ended regular programming on its analog signal, over UHF channel 46, on June 12, 2009, the official digital television transition date. The station's digital signal remained on its pre-transition UHF channel 47.

As part of the SAFER Act, WJZY kept its analog signal on the air in the immediate aftermath of the switch until July 9 to inform viewers of the digital television transition through a loop of public service announcements from the National Association of Broadcasters.

=== ATSC 3.0 ===
WJZY debuted on Charlotte's new ATSC 3.0 (NextGen TV) service, hosted by WAXN-TV, on July 7, 2021.
