= Daystar Television Network =

Religious television network

- Type: Religious broadcasting
- Country: United States
- Broadcast area: Nationwide; Worldwide
- Affiliates: List of Daystar stations
- Headquarters: Bedford, Texas

Programming
- Language: English
- Picture format: 1080i (HDTV) (downscaled to 480i/576i for the SDTV feed)

Ownership
- Owner: Word of God Fellowship
- Key people: Rachel Lamb Brown

History
- Founded: 1993; 33 years ago
- Launched: December 31, 1997 (28 years ago)
- Founder: Marcus and Joni Lamb

Links
- Website: www.daystar.com

The Daystar Television Network commonly known as Daystar Television or just Daystar, is an American evangelical Christian religious television network owned by the Word of God Fellowship, founded by Marcus Lamb in 1993. Daystar is headquartered in the Dallas/Fort Worth Metroplex in Bedford, Texas. The network is based around prosperity theology.

== History ==
In 1984, Marcus and Joni Lamb (née Trammell) moved to Montgomery, Alabama, to launch the state's first full-power Christian television station, WMCF-TV. The Lambs built the station for the next five years, and sold it in 1990. They next moved to Dallas, Texas, where, in 1993, they purchased the formerly defunct KMPX. In 1996, with a large contribution from Kenneth Copeland Ministries, the Lambs purchased a station in Colorado, officially turning their television ministry into a network. In August 1997, the small staff moved into a 32,000-square-foot (3,000 m^{2}) facility that included production studios; Daystar was officially launched on New Year's Eve 1997.

On March 21, 2011, Daystar announced that it would downsize its production studios in Ashland, Kentucky; Houston, Texas; and Denver, Colorado, effective the following month; the facilities would continue to be used as transmitters, but not broadcasting centers, leading to layoffs. Further studios were abandoned and centralized to the network's Bedford, Texas headquarters with the 2019 repeal of the FCC's Main Studio Rule.

On November 30, 2021, Marcus Lamb died after being hospitalized with COVID-19. In 2023, Joni would remarry to Doug Weiss, who became her Daystar co-host. Marcus and Joni Lamb son Jonathan, who previously served as Daystar Vice President, would be fired from the network in 2024. On May 7, 2026, Joni Lamb died following health challenges which worsened as a result of a back injury. With Joni Lamb's death, leadership of Daystar was transferred to the network board of directors.

== Controversies ==
=== FCC investigation ===
In 2003, Daystar was investigated by the Federal Communications Commission (FCC), centering on allegations that Daystar sold air time on its non-commercial educational stations to for-profit groups. The investigation complicated Daystar's US$21.5 million bid for KOCE-TV, a PBS station in Huntington Beach, California which at the time mainly served the suburban area of Orange County, and other license renewals. After a lengthy process, Daystar and KOCE-TV eventually came to an agreement where Daystar leased a digital subchannel of KOCE, and broadcast network programming over KOCE-DT3 into Orange County and the Los Angeles area. This agreement has remained in place into the early 2020s, with KOCE since becoming the flagship Los Angeles area member station of PBS in January 2011, replacing KCET after that station defected from the network (the groups eventually merged, with KCET re-joining PBS secondarily).

On December 22, 2008, the FCC and Daystar entered into an agreement whereby Daystar would continue to utilize a multi-level review process to make sure its programming would not breach the underwriting spot guidelines applied by the FCC to non-commercial television stations, and would make additional good faith efforts to review all content received from external providers and remove direct calls for action before broadcasting the programming on Daystar's non-commercial educational stations. Daystar also agreed to pay a fine of $17,500 for past non-compliance.

On March 13, 2012, the FCC questioned whether Daystar, through associated nonprofit companies, was qualified to purchase former PBS outlets KWBU-TV in Waco, Texas (which was renamed KDYW) and WMFE-TV in Orlando, Florida. The WMFE deal was canceled two days later; the station was later resold and returned to PBS as WUCF-TV. On September 7, 2012, KDYW's licensee, the Brazos Valley Broadcasting Foundation, informed the FCC that it would request the dismissal of the license assignment application and the cancellation of the KDYW license, with the cancellation becoming final on September 27.

=== Israel ===
Daystar became the first foreign Christian network to be given a broadcast license by the Israeli government in 2006. The announcement was criticized by Jewish leaders in both Israel and the United States, who believed the network aimed at converting Israeli Jews through its numerous Messianic Jewish programs. In 2007, Israeli cable provider HOT announced it would drop Daystar from its lineup, stating that the decision was made after the company received complaints about Daystar's content. Daystar filed a petition with the Israeli Supreme Court to hear the case, accusing HOT of religious discrimination. Two years later, HOT reversed its decision and resumed carrying Daystar.

=== Lawsuits ===
On November 30, 2010, Marcus Lamb appeared on Celebration and admitted to having had an extramarital affair several years before, telling viewers that unidentified individuals had attempted to extort money from him over the incident. He said that he had since reconciled with Joni over the matter; the Lambs subsequently appeared on Good Morning America and Dr. Phil to discuss their experiences with marriage counseling.

Lamb's confession sparked a series of legal actions against Daystar. Former Daystar executive Jeanette Hawkins filed a lawsuit against the network, claiming that her knowledge of the affair caused "great emotional pain". In February 2011, Jennifer Falcon, a former Daystar employee, filed a lawsuit claiming to have suffered sexual harassment, as well as demotion and defamation by the Lambs. The following month, Karen Thompson, a former producer for Joni, sued Daystar for wrongful termination, claiming to have been harassed and fired for dating a male co-worker.

An October 2011 decision, entered after a contested hearing by a Dallas court, dismissed the Hawkins fraud claim. All of the suits were withdrawn two months later when Falcon and Thompson withdrew their suit against the network, and no parties received compensation for the dispute.

=== Paycheck Protection Program ===
Word of God Fellowship applied for a Paycheck Protection Program loan and received $3.9 million, under the reasoning of meeting employee payroll. Two weeks later, WoGF purchased a Gulfstream V. Inside Edition questioned in an investigation if the organization had used the PPP loan funds to purchase the aircraft rather than for payroll purposes. Shortly after the report aired, the loan was paid back with interest.

=== COVID-19 claims ===
During the COVID-19 pandemic in the United States, Daystar was criticized for airing several programs which featured prominent anti-vaccine personalities such as Robert F. Kennedy Jr., Del Bigtree, and Simone Gold, who along with Daystar hosts promoted misinformation about the pandemic. In their broadcasts, Marcus and Joni Lamb repeatedly touted discredited COVID-19 treatments such as hydroxychloroquine and ivermectin; both contracted COVID-19 despite these treatments, with Marcus Lamb dying from COVID-related complications in November 2021. Daystar had also filed a lawsuit against the Biden administration over its COVID-19 vaccination mandate, calling it a "sin against God's Holy Word".

In October 2021, Australian pay television company Foxtel, which offers Daystar as part of its channel package, announced that it was conducting a review after receiving complaints about Daystar programs featuring interviews promoting conspiracy theories about, and unproven treatments for, COVID-19. The review subsequently found that Daystar did not breach any industry codes of practice for news and current affairs programs, or any federal or state law. Although the Australian Communications and Media Authority (ACMA) has issued a Code of Practice on Disinformation and Misinformation for online platforms, this does not include television broadcasters.

In February 2022, New Zealand’s Broadcasting Standards Authority (BSA) upheld a complaint concerning an episode of Marcus and Joni that aired on Daystar and was rebroadcast by Mainland TV. The BSA found the episode breached the accuracy standard by promoting misinformation about COVID-19 vaccines, including false claims about vaccine safety, conspiracy theories suggesting a planned pandemic, and the endorsement of ineffective treatments. The Authority determined the programme misled viewers and that Daystar had not made reasonable efforts to ensure accuracy. It ordered Daystar to broadcast a corrective statement and imposed costs of NZ$500 each on Daystar and Mainland TV, payable to the Crown.

=== Sexual abuse coverup allegations ===
In late November 2024, Jonathan Lamb, son of Daystar founders Marcus and Joni Lamb, and his wife Suzy went on social media and disclosed that their daughter had been molested by a man identified only under the pseudonym of "Pete." They said that when the incident was reported along with a later incident in which "Pete" was found with their daughter, Marcus and Joni Lamb allegedly covered up the abuse. Suzy Lamb made a separate allegation that she had been sexually assaulted by an unlicensed chiropractor hired by her in-laws and that Jonathan had been fired after refusing to sign a non-disclosure agreement. On November 26, Joni Lamb issued a response charging that Jonathan was dismissed following a poor performance review and accusing the younger Lambs of "fabricating a smear campaign" because Jonathan Lamb was disappointed that he was not made president of Daystar after the death of his father.

After an 18 month investigation, Colleyville, TX police closed the investigation due to lack of evidence. Additionally, "Pete" was never named a person of interest by police.

Despite this, several high profile Christian programmers, including Joyce Meyer, Jesse Duplantis, Lance Wallnau, Jack Graham, Ray Comfort, and Greg Laurie took their shows off the Daystar network following the scandal.

== Availability ==
Daystar is available on broadcast and cable television in the United States and worldwide on direct broadcast satellite systems such as DirecTV and Dish Network, and unencrypted satellite. The network is composed of two VHF and 37 UHF television stations, which each broadcast all or part of Daystar's program lineup. Daystar owns a number of television stations in the U.S., either directly or through its parent company, Word of God Fellowship, Inc. The network also offers Spanish language translation of most programming via the second audio program, which is sometimes offered by some pay television providers as its own network.

On June 13, 2013, Daystar entered into a strategic partnership with Canadian-based religious network Grace TV, in which the network's non-Canadian content (constituting 65% of programming) would be supplied by Daystar. Additionally, Daystar picked up You Are Loved, a program hosted by Grace TV's CEO, Peter Youngren. The network ultimately re-branded as Daystar Canada.

Daystar's HD service is available in the UK via the Astra 2G satellite as part of the Sky and Freesat platforms and via terrestrial TV on the Freeview platform.

== See also ==
- List of United States over-the-air television networks#Religious television networks
