= Central Texas College =

Community college in Killeen, Texas, U.S.

Coordinates: 31.119658°N 97.808951°W

- Type: Public community college
- Established: 1965
- Accreditation: SACS
- Chancellor: Michele Carter
- Students: 7,649 (Fall 2021)
- Location: Killeen, Texas, U.S.
- Nickname: Eagles
- Website: www.ctcd.edu

Central Texas College (CTC) is a public community college in Killeen, Texas. Founded in 1965, it has branch campuses in Europe and on military installations across the U.S.

== History ==
Central Texas College was established by a vote of the citizens of Central Texas in 1965 to serve the western section of Bell and Coryell Counties. The campus was constructed on more than 500 acres of land donated by Fort Hood between Killeen and Copperas Cove. In September 1967, the school opened its doors to 2,068 students. CTC has been accredited by the Southern Association of Colleges and Schools since 1969.

As defined by the Texas Legislature, the official service area of CTC comprises:

- All of Coryell, Hamilton, Lampasas, Llano, Mason, Mills, and San Saba Counties
- Killeen Independent School District, located in Bell County
- Copperas Cove Independent School District, located in Bell and Coryell Counties
- Fort Hood and North Fort Hood in Bell County
- Brady, Lohn, and Rochelle ISDs located within McCulloch County
- Burnet Consolidated Independent School District located within Burnet County
- Florence and Marble Falls school districts
- The portion of the Lampasas Independent School District located within Burnet and Bell Counties
- Fredericksburg ISD and Gillespie County, added effective September 1, 2015, after legislative approval

Due to its proximity to the US Army installation at FortHood, Central Texas College has a large number of military-affiliated students. CTC instituted classes and programs on the fort in 1970 and in Europe in 1974. Success with the military led to branch campuses at military installations such as Fort Leonard Wood in Missouri, South Korea, and on-ship with the Atlantic and Pacific Fleets of the US Navy in 1976. By the early 1980s, CTC offered classes to military personnel in the Pacific Command, Alaska, and Panama. CTC offered classes for the Texas Department of Criminal Justice in the prisons at Gatesville, Texas, in 1976.

In addition to its Texas locations, CTC still has a presence on more than 20 US military installations, in Europe, and deployed locations offer more than 100 programs fully online.

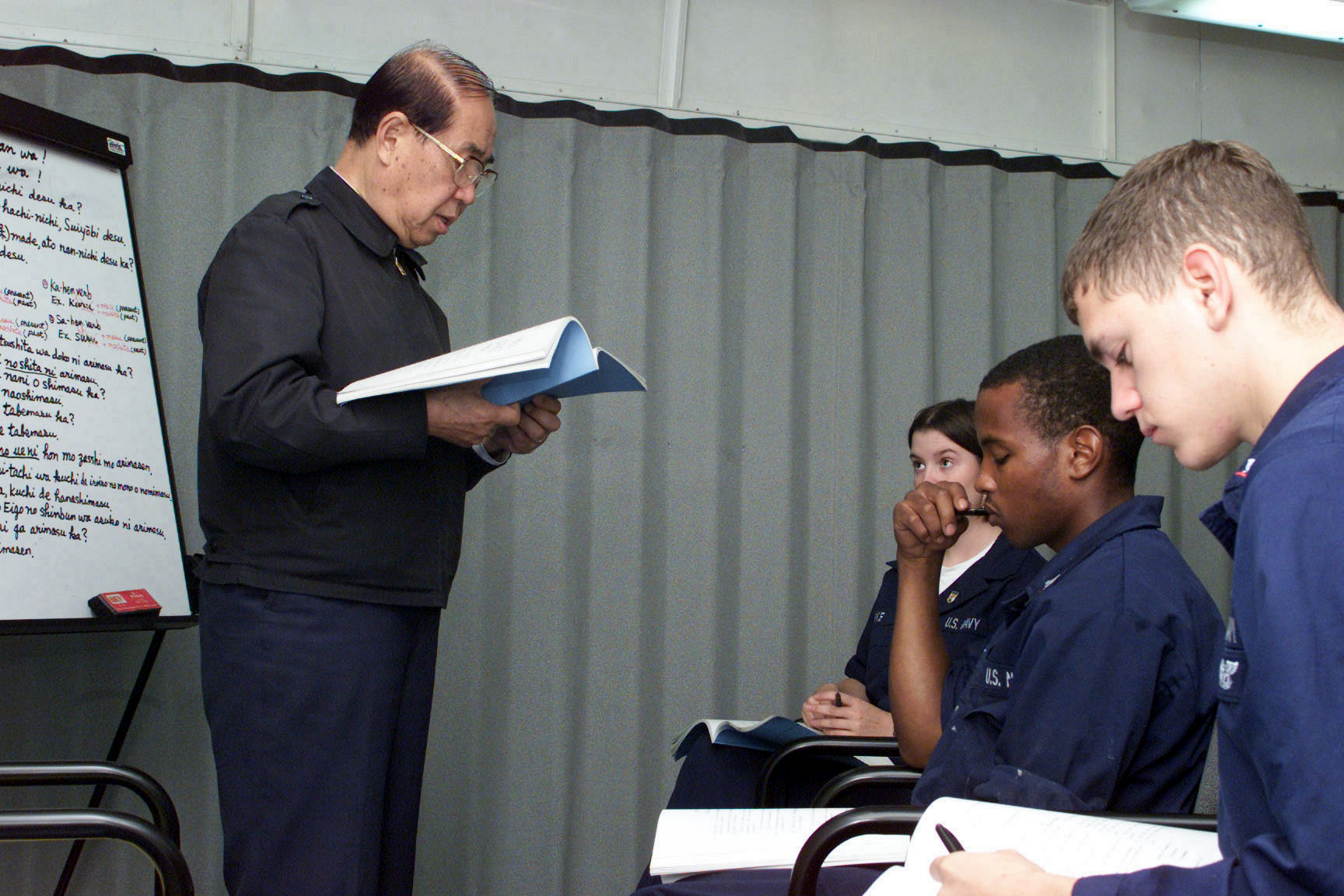
Dr. Minoru Fukuda, contracted instructor through Central Texas College, teaches crewmembers aboard the USS Essex in elementary Japanese

Central Texas College had a nationally ranked tennis team in the early 1970s, playing as the Golden Eagles. In 2013, a campus-wide vote led to the selection of CTC's new official mascot, the Eagle.

== Academics ==
Students enrolled at CTC may select a degree plan from associate of arts, associate of science, or associate in applied science degree programs, or an associate of arts in general studies, with more than 40 certificate programs.

== Main campus ==
At the main campus, which is partly in Copperas Cove and partly in Killeen, the central courtyard has a memorial statue to Lyndon Baines Johnson and a fountain by which metal markers indicate the boundary between Bell and Coryell Counties. CTC's main library is named in honor of Oveta Culp Hobby. CTC's older buildings are built in Spanish Colonial Revival Style.

CTC is also home to the beautiful music station KNCT-FM.
