= WRIW-CD =

WYCN-LD translator in Providence, Rhode Island

Translator of WYCN-LD, Providence, Rhode Island
- Providence, Rhode Island; United States
- Channels: Digital: 2 (VHF), shared with WPVD-TV; Virtual: 51
- Branding: Telemundo Providence; Noticiero Telemundo Nueva Inglaterra (newscasts)

Programming
- Affiliations: 51.1: Telemundo; 51.2: Cozi TV; 51.3: Oxygen

Ownership
- Owner: Telemundo Station Group; (NBC Telemundo License LLC)
- Sister stations: Broadcast: WYCN-LD, WNEU, WBTS-CD, WVIT, WRDM-CD; Cable: NECN, NBC Sports Boston

History
- First air date: June 7, 1993
- Former call signs: W23AS (1989–1995); WRIW-LP (1995–2008); WRIW-CA (2008–2013)
- Former channel numbers: Analog: 23 (UHF, 1993–1999), 50 (UHF, 1999–2013); Digital: 50 (UHF, 2013–2015), 36 (UHF, 2015–2018), 17 (UHF, shared with WPXQ-TV and WLWC, 2018–2021); Virtual: 50 (2012–2018)
- Former affiliations: Independent (1993–1995); America One (1995–2000)
- Call sign meaning: Rhode Island, Warwick

Technical information
- Licensing authority: FCC
- Facility ID: 70184
- Class: CD
- ERP: 13.6 kW
- HAAT: 273.4 m (897 ft)
- Transmitter coordinates: 41°51′55.4″N 71°17′12.7″W

Links
- Public license information: Public file; LMS
- Website: www.telemundonuevainglaterra.com/noticias/local/rhode-island/

WRIW-CD (channel 51) is a Class A television station in Providence, Rhode Island, United States. It is a standard-definition translator of Telemundo owned-and-operated station WYCN-LD (channel 8) which is owned by the Telemundo Station Group subsidiary of NBCUniversal. WRIW-CD's parent station maintains studios on Kenney Drive in Cranston (shared with dual NBC/ABC affiliate WJAR [channel 10], owned by the Sinclair Broadcast Group).

Under a channel sharing arrangement, WRIW-CD shares transmitter facilities with PBS member station WPVD-TV (channel 36) on Pine Street in Rehoboth, Massachusetts. Despite WRIW-CD legally holding a low-power Class A license, it transmits using WPVD-TV's full-power spectrum. This ensures complete reception across the Providence–New Bedford, Massachusetts television market.

== History ==
At one point, the station broadcast English-language programming, including locally produced programs hosted by former air talent at WHIM. WRIW-LP became a Telemundo affiliate in 2000; ZGS Communications then acquired the station from Viking Broadcasting in 2003.

On July 29, 2012, WRIW-CA began broadcasting its signal in digital from the WJAR tower in Rehoboth, Massachusetts, and subsequently changed its call sign to WRIW-CD on January 7, 2013.

On December 4, 2017, NBCUniversal's Telemundo Station Group announced its purchase of ZGS' 13 television stations, including WRIW-CD. This made WRIW the second television station in the Providence market to be owned and operated by NBC—after WJAR (channel 10, now an NBC/ABC affiliate owned by Sinclair Broadcast Group), which was owned by the network from 1996 to 2006. The sale was completed on July 20, 2018.

In October 2019, WRIW-CD began simulcasting low-power WYCN-LD in order to reach the entire Providence−New Bedford market (the latter station changed its city of license to Providence and moved its transmitter to Norton, Massachusetts).

== Newscasts ==
WRIW-CD began simulcasting the newscasts of Boston sister station WNEU on July 20, 2018, immediately following the completion of the sale to NBCUniversal. In the announcement, WNEU president and general manager Mike St. Peter stated his intention to hire a Providence-based reporter for the newscast.

== Subchannels ==
Subchannels of WPVD-TV and WRIW-CD
License	Subchannel	Res.	Short name	Programming
WPVD-TV	36.1	1080i	WSBE-HD	PBS
WPVD-TV	36.2	480i	WSBE-D2	[Blank] (4:3)
WRIW-CD	51.1	480i	WRIW-CD	Telemundo (WYCN-LD) in SD
WRIW-CD	51.2	480i	COZI	Cozi TV
WRIW-CD	51.3	480i	OXYGEN	Oxygen

Simulcast of subchannels of another station
