= WRTD-CD =

Television station in Raleigh, North Carolina

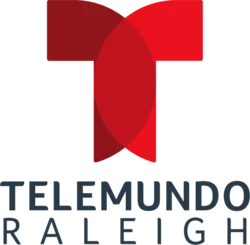
- Raleigh, North Carolina; United States
- Channels: Digital: 15 (UHF), shared with WRAZ; Virtual: 54
- Branding: Telemundo Raleigh

Programming
- Affiliations: 54.1: Telemundo

Ownership
- Owner: Telemundo Station Group; (NBC Telemundo License LLC)

History
- Founded: 1991
- Former call signs: W60BT (1991–1999); WHOA-LP (1999–2005); WZGS-CA (2005–2013); WZGS-CD (2013–2018)
- Former channel numbers: Digital: 44 (UHF, 2013–2018), 49 (UHF, 2018–2019); Virtual: 44 (2013–2018)
- Former affiliations: America's Store (c. 2002–2003); Telemundo (2005–2010); Independent (2010–2018)
- Call sign meaning: Raleigh/Research Triangle Telemundo/Durham

Technical information
- Licensing authority: FCC
- Facility ID: 41095
- ERP: 805.4 kW
- HAAT: 607 m (1,991 ft)
- Transmitter coordinates: 35°40′29″N 78°31′39″W

Links
- Public license information: Public file; LMS

WRTD-CD (channel 54) is a Class A television station licensed to Raleigh, North Carolina, United States, serving as the Research Triangle area's outlet for the Spanish-language network Telemundo. The station is owned and operated by the Telemundo Station Group subsidiary of NBCUniversal. Under a channel sharing agreement, WRTD-CD shares transmitter facilities with Fox affiliate WRAZ (channel 50, owned by locally based Capitol Broadcasting Company) near Auburn, North Carolina. The station originates its master control from the facilities of WZDC-CD in Washington, D.C., whose website links to WRTD's public file.

Despite WRTD-CD legally holding a low-power Class A license, it transmits using WRAZ's full-power spectrum. This ensures complete reception across the Research Triangle television market (Raleigh−Durham−Chapel Hill−Fayetteville).

== History ==
The station signed on in 1991 as W60BT. Its call sign was changed to WHOA-LP in 1999, and to WZGS-CA in 2005.

WZGS-CA went silent on April 1, 2010, due to losing its first affiliation with Telemundo. It then became an independent station, airing English, Spanish and Portuguese programming. In the interim, the national cable/satellite feed for Telemundo served the market.

WZGS-CA resumed broadcasting on March 25, 2011. The station changed its call sign to WZGS-CD on May 31, 2013.

On December 4, 2017, NBCUniversal's Telemundo Station Group announced its purchase of ZGS Communications' 13 television stations, including WZGS-CD. The sale marks NBCUniversal's re-entry into the Raleigh–Durham market, as they owned WNCN (channel 17) from 1996 to 2006 (it is now a CBS affiliate, owned by Nexstar Media Group). The sale was completed on July 20, 2018. NBCUniversal changed the station's call letters to WRTD-CD on July 25, 2018; the station also rejoined Telemundo.

== Subchannels ==
WRAZ/WRTD-CD's transmitter is located near Auburn, North Carolina.

Subchannels of WRAZ and WRTD-CD
License	Subchannel	Res.	Short name	Programming
WRAZ	50.1	720p	WRAZ-HD	Fox
WRAZ	50.2	720p	MeTV	MeTV
WRAZ	50.3	480i	DABL	Dabl
WRAZ	50.4	480i	WRAZ4	Heroes & Icons
WRTD-CD	54.1	480i	WRTD-CD	Telemundo
