= Telemundo 51 =

Telemundo 51 may refer to:

- WSCV, Miami, Florida
- KNSO, Fresno, California
- WRIW-CD, Providence, Rhode Island (repeats WYCN-LD)
