= WRDM-CD =

Television station in Hartford, Connecticut

WRDM-CD and WDMR-LD

WRDM-CD: Hartford–New Haven, Connecticut; WDMR-LD: Springfield, Massachusetts; United States
- Channels for WRDM-CD: Digital: 31 (UHF), shared with WVIT; Virtual: 19
- Channels for WDMR-LD: Digital: 23 (UHF); Virtual: 14
- Branding: Telemundo Connecticut; Noticiero Telemundo Nueva Inglaterra (newscasts)

Programming
- Affiliations: 19.1/14.1: Telemundo; 19.2/14.2: TeleXitos

Ownership
- Owner: Telemundo Station Group; (NBC Telemundo License LLC)
- Sister stations: WVIT

History
- Founded: WRDM-CD: 1985; WDMR-LD: 1988
- First air date: WRDM-CD: June 14, 1986; WDMR-LD: June 13, 1991
- Former call signs: WRDM-CD: W13BF (1985–1995); WRDM-LP (1995–2008); WRDM-CA (2008–2013); WDMR-LD: W65BX (1988–1995); WDMR-LP (1995–2012)
- Former channel number: WRDM-CD: Analog: 13 (VHF, 1986–2006), 50 (UHF, 2006–2013); Digital: 19 (UHF, 2013–2018), 35 (UHF, 2018–2019); Virtual: 50 (2013–2018); WDMR-LD: Analog: 65 (UHF, 1991–2006), 51 (UHF, 2006–2012); Digital: 51 (UHF, 2012–2019)
- Former affiliations: All secondary: Rai Internazionale Americas (1986–2001); TVP Polonia (per program, 1993–2001); Jewelry Television (overnights, c. 2001–2018)
- Call sign meaning: WRDM-CD: Ruzzier, D'Agostino, Minniti (former owners); WDMR-LD: anagram of WRDM-CD

Technical information
- Licensing authority: FCC
- Facility ID: WRDM-CD: 10153; WDMR-LD: 10154
- Class: WDMR-LD: LD
- ERP: WRDM-CD: 374 kW; WDMR-LD: 15 kW
- HAAT: WRDM-CD: 450 m (1,476 ft); WDMR-LD: 146 m (479 ft)
- Transmitter coordinates: WRDM-CD: 41°42′2″N 72°49′55″W; WDMR-LD: 42°5′7.3″N 72°42′10.3″W

Links
- Public license information: WRDM-CD: Public file; LMS; WDMR-LD: Public file; LMS
- Website: Connecticut section on WNEU's website

WRDM-CD (channel 19) is a Class A television station licensed to Hartford, Connecticut, United States, serving as the Hartford–New Haven market's outlet for the Spanish-language network Telemundo. It is owned and operated by NBCUniversal's Telemundo Station Group NBCUniversal's Telemundo Station Group alongside NBC outlet WVIT (channel 30). The two stations share studios on New Britain Avenue in West Hartford and transmitter facilities on Rattlesnake Mountain in Farmington, Connecticut. Despite WRDM-CD legally holding a low-power Class A license, it transmits using WVIT's full-power spectrum. This ensures complete reception across the Hartford–New Haven market.

WDMR-LD (channel 14) in Springfield, Massachusetts, operates as a translator of WRDM, serving the Pioneer Valley. This station's transmitter is located on Provin Mountain in the Feeding Hills section of Agawam, Massachusetts.

== History ==
WRDM logo when the station broadcast on channel 13

Previous logo; used until nationwide Telemundo rebrand on December 8, 2012.

WRDM-CD signed on June 14, 1986; it claims to be the first Spanish-language television station in New England. The station initially operated on channel 13 under the call letters W13BF. On June 13, 1991, the station added a simulcast in Springfield, W65BX (channel 65). Initially, in addition to Telemundo programming, W13BF and W65BX aired programming in Italian from public broadcaster Radiotelevisione Italiana (RAI)'s international service, with additional programming in Greek and Polish. The television stations were joined by radio station WRDM (1550 AM, now WSDK) in 1993; on September 1, 1995, W13BF changed its call letters to WRDM-LP, and W65BX became WDMR-LP. WRDM radio was sold off in 1998. During the late 1990s, WDMR-LP's schedule also included English-language Boston Red Sox telecasts produced by Boston's WABU (now Ion Television owned-and-operated station WBPX-TV). By 1997, WRDM-LP's programming was simulcast in New Haven on W10BQ (channel 10, now defunct) and in Hartford on W11BJ (channel 11, now WFXQ-CD channel 28 in Springfield).

Original owner Channel 13 Television sold WRDM-LP and WDMR-LP to ZGS Communications on March 27, 2001. In January 2006, WRDM-LP moved to channel 50; WDMR-LP moved to channel 51 that November. WRDM became a class A station as WRDM-CA on May 7, 2008. On November 15, 2012, WDMR flash cut from analog to digital as WDMR-LD; on January 7, 2013, WRDM followed suit and became WRDM-CD. WDMR-LD now serves as a complete simulcast of WRDM-CD.

On December 4, 2017, NBCUniversal's Telemundo Station Group announced its purchase of ZGS' 13 television stations, including WRDM-CD and WDMR-LD. The sale was completed on February 1, 2018. The deal made WRDM a sister station to NBC owned-and-operated station WVIT (channel 30), along with WNBC (channel 4) and WNJU (channel 47) to the southwest in New York City, and WBTS-LD (channel 8), WYCN-CD (channel 15) and WNEU (channel 60) to the northeast in Boston. WVIT began operating WRDM under a local marketing agreement on January 1, 2018 from WVIT's studios in West Hartford; WRDM later entered into a channel sharing agreement with WVIT. ZGS had sold WRDM's spectrum in the FCC's incentive auction for $10,574,516 and indicated that the station would enter into a post-auction channel sharing agreement. One immediate effect of the sale was the end of a brokered programming arrangement to carry English language Jewelry TV programming in overnights for Telemundo's regular overnight schedule, along with the addition of a Connecticut-specific part of the website for WNEU in place of the former WRDM website.

== Newscasts ==
WRDM-LP began producing a newscast in April 1998; at the outset, Noticiero 13 primarily featured reports from Puerto Rico and Latin America, with local news coverage being added in June 1999. The station's news operation was discontinued in the early 2000s; WRDM then began carrying Telenoticias Puerto Rico from WKAQ-TV in San Juan.

On December 15, 2017, NBCUniversal announced that, following its acquisition of WRDM-CD, the station (along with WDMR-LD) would begin simulcasting the newscasts of Boston sister station WNEU; the newscasts will include news from Connecticut and western Massachusetts from a reporter based at WRDM's facilities at the WVIT studios in West Hartford.

== Technical information ==
The stations' signals are multiplexed:

=== WRDM-CD subchannels ===
Subchannels of WVIT and WRDM-CD
License	Subchannel	Res.	Short name	Programming
WVIT	30.1	1080i	WVIT-HD	NBC
WVIT	30.2	480i	COZI-TV	Cozi TV
WVIT	30.3	480i	CRIMES	NBC True CRMZ
WVIT	30.4	480i	OXYGEN	Oxygen
WRDM-CD	19.1	1080i	TLMD	Telemundo
WRDM-CD	19.2	480i	EXITOS	TeleXitos

=== WDMR-LD subchannels ===
Subchannels of WDMR-LD
Subchannel	Res.	Short name	Programming
14.1	1080i	WDMR-DT	Telemundo
14.2	480i	XITOS	TeleXitos
14.3	480i	Crimes	NBC True CRMZ
14.4	480i	Oxygen	Oxygen

WDMR-LD also broadcasts the national services NBC True CRMZ and Oxygen, which are carried by WVIT as subchannels 30.3 and 30.4.

=== Spectrum auction repack ===
On August 2, 2019, WVIT and WRDM-CD were switched from RF 35 to RF 31.
