= Telemundo Station Group =

Television station division of Telemundo

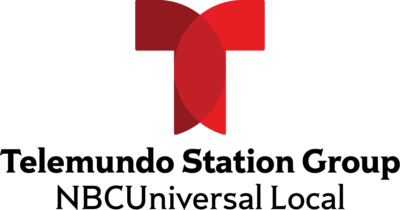
- Type: Division
- Industry: Broadcast television
- Owner: Sony Pictures Entertainment (majority) (1997–2001); Liberty Media (majority) (1997–2001)
- Parent: NBC Broadcasting (2001–2013); NBCUniversal Local (2013–present)
- Divisions: 25 TV stations; TeleXitos
- Website: together.nbcuni.com/n/telemundo-station-group/

Telemundo Station Group is the division of NBCUniversal Local (NBCUniversal), a subsidiary of Comcast that oversees their Telemundo owned-and-operated television stations and the TeleXitos network. The NBC owned-and-operated stations are held in the separate NBC Owned Television Stations division.

== History ==
Telemundo was formed as NetSpan in 1984 by the owners of WNJU in Linden, New Jersey (serving the New York City area) and KSTS in San Jose, California. These stations joined KVEA in Los Angeles in 1985. The following year, KVEA's part-owner, Reliance Group Holdings, purchased John Blair & Co., which owned WKAQ-TV in San Juan, Puerto Rico, branded on air as Telemundo, and WSCV in Fort Lauderdale–Miami-West Palm Beach. In late 1986, Reliance took control over WNJU and KSTS.

In 1987, Reliance merged all these stations into the Telemundo Group. The new corporation quickly went public, and in 1987, Reliance decided to rebrand NetSpan as Telemundo. It then established KTMD in Houston and KVDA in San Antonio.

On November 9, 1995, Essaness Communications sold a 74.5% controlling interest in WSNS-TV in Chicago to Telemundo for $44.7 million, with Essaness retaining a 25.5% stake. Essaness would later sell its stake in the partnership to Telemundo in 2003.

In 1997, Liberty Media and Sony Pictures Entertainment purchased a majority interest in Telemundo from Reliance Capital Group. NBC would then purchase Telemundo from Sony and Liberty Media in 2001. Telemundo in 2001 would also acquire KXTX-TV in Dallas.

In April 2002, NBC bought then Holbrook, Arizona station KPHZ (now KTAZ) and its translators un Phoenix, Arizona (KPHZ-LP and KPSW-LP) from Venture Technologies Group for $7,5 million. It was finalized on September 26, 2002. In 2005, NBC/Telemundo successfully got FCC approval to swap licenses with the Daystar Network's owned KDTP: the KPHZ license moved from Holbrook to Phoenix, broadcasting on channel 39. Daystar's KDTP license then moved from Phoenix to Holbrook, broadcasting on channel 11. These changes were completed in 2006.

In September 2002, NBC agreed to acquire WPXB in the Boston area from Paxson Communications, with the intention of making it a Telemundo owned-and-operated station. Paxson, which was in the process of selling some of its stations in order to raise $100 million, had originally planned to sell WPXB to another company, but NBC had a right of first refusal on Paxson's stations in the fifty largest markets, which it had obtained when it acquired a 32 percent stake in Paxson in 1999. NBC completed its purchase of WPXB on October 29, 2002; two days later, the call letters were changed to WNEU.

On October 8, 2002, NBC announced that it would acquire three Telemundo affiliates: KHRR (in Tucson) and KDRX-CA (in Phoenix) from Television Apogeo, and KNSO (in Fresno) from Sainte Partners II, L.P. The sale of Arizona stations were completed on January 1, 2003; while the acquisition of the Telemundo-affiliate in Fresno was completed on April 30, 2003.

On February 23, 2005, NBC bought Telemundo affiliate KBLR in Las Vegas for $32.1 million. The sale was completed on May 24, 2005.

In January 2006, NBCUniversal agreed to buy Denver's KDEN-TV from Longmont Broadcasting. The acquisition was completed on July 13. In November, NBCUniversal agreed to donate Steamboat Springs' KMAS-TV (who was the main Telemundo affiliate for Denver before NBC's acquisition of KDEN) to Rocky Mountain Public Broadcasting Network. The donation was completed on July 26, 2007.

On January 26, 2011, NBCUniversal announced the sale of its Spanish-language independent station KWHY-TV to the Meruelo Group due to its pending merger with Comcast. The sale was completed on July 1.

On March 21, 2013, NBCUniversal entered into an agreement to acquire WWSI from ZGS Communications for $20 million. Prior to the sale agreement, WWSI had been the largest station (in terms of market size) aligned with Telemundo that was not an owned-and-operated station of the network. The deal created a duopoly with NBC-owned Philadelphia station WCAU. The sale was completed on July 2.

In July 2013, NBC Owned Television Stations and Telemundo's owned stations were brought together under a newly formed division, NBCUniversal Owned Television Stations, under NBC TV Station president Valari Staab.

In 2017, NBCUniversal announced that it was hiring people for NBC-owned KNSD in San Diego with the intention of launching a new Telemundo-owned station in the area, replacing Tijuana, Mexico-licensed station XHAS-TDT (whose affiliation expired at the end of June 2017). The new Telemundo affiliate, branded as "Telemundo 20", launched on July 1 on KNSD's digital 39.20 subchannel. On September 12, 2017, NBCUniversal acquired KUAN-LD from NRJ TV, LLC, to serve as San Diego's Telemundo station instead; the sale was completed on December 21, 2017.

On December 4, 2017, NBCUniversal announced its purchase of ZGS Communications's ten Spanish-language television stations. The sale was completed in early 2018. Two of the stations (WRIW-CD and WZGS-CD) were filed separately, as ZGS were negotiating channel sharing agreements at the time of the sale. Those sales were completed in July 2018.

On March 5, 2019, KCSO-LD in Sacramento, California and KTMW in Salt Lake City (and their respective repeater stations) were acquired from Serestar Communications.

On July 30, 2021 NBCUniversal announced it was buying Albuquerque, New Mexico Telemundo affiliate KASA-TV and its repeater stations for $12.5 million dollars. In the short term NBC announced it was entering a transitional services agreement Gray Television, which had purchased Fox affiliate KJTV-TV and other Ramar television assets in Lubbock, Texas earlier in 2021. The deal will give NBCU Telemundo station group 31 stations and marks the end of 23 years of Ramar's ownership of the Telemundo affiliation in the city.

== Stations ==
City of license / Market	State	Station	Channel TV (RF)	Owned since	Secondary owned networks
Phoenix	Arizona	KTAZ	39 (29)	2002	TeleX, Cozi, NBC True CRMZ, Oxygen
Tucson	Arizona	KHRR	40 (16)	2003	TeleX, NBC True CRMZ, Oxygen
Corona - Los Angeles	California	KVEA (Note: Original "NetSpan" station (predecessor network to what would become Telemundo))	52 (25)	1985	TeleX
Clovis - Fresno	California	KNSO	51 (27)	2003	TeleX, Cozi, NBC True CRMZ, Oxygen
Poway - San Diego	California	KUAN-LD	48 (17)	2017	TeleX
Sacramento	California	KCSO-LD (Note: a station owned by Serestar Communications before its sale to NBC Universal's Telemundo Station Group in 2019)	33 (3)	2019	TeleX, NBC True CRMZ
Sacramento	California	KMUM-CD (Repeater of KCSO-LD)	33 (31)	2019	TeleX, NBC True CRMZ
San Jose - San Francisco - Oakland	California	KSTS	48 (19)	1984	TeleX, NBC True CRMZ, Oxygen
Salinas - Monterey	California	K15CU-D (Note: a station built and signed on by Telemundo) (Note: Though traditionally owned by Telemundo as a translator of KSTS, since 2014 this station no longer carries Telemundo programming and instead carries Cozi TV in English on its primary channel; Telemundo is now on KMUV-LD (owned by News-Press & Gazette Company).)	15 (15)	1990	Cozi, NBC True CRMZ, TeleX, Oxygen
Longmont - Denver	Colorado	KDEN-TV	25 (29)	2006	TeleX, Cozi, NBC True CRMZ, Oxygen
Hartford - New Haven	Connecticut	WRDM-CD (Note: Indicates a station owned by ZGS Communications before its sale to NBCUniversal's Telemundo Station Group in 2018)	19 (31)	2018	TeleX
Washington	District of Columbia	WZDC-CD	44 (34)	2018	TeleX
Fort Lauderdale - Miami - West Palm Beach	Florida	WSCV	51 (30)	1987	TeleX, Telemundo Palm Beach
Naples - Fort Myers	Florida	WWDT-CD	43 (43)	2018	NBC True CRMZ
Orlando	Florida	WTMO-CD	31 (31)	2018	TeleX, NBC True CRMZ
Tampa - St. Petersburg	Florida	WRMD-CD	49 (30)	2018	TeleX, NBC True CRMZ, Oxygen
Chicago	Illinois	WSNS-TV (Note: This station was jointly owned by Ensaness Communications from 1996 to 2003.)	44 (33)	1996	TeleX
Merrimack - Manchester, New Hampshire - Boston	Massachusetts	WNEU	60 (29)	2002	NBC True CRMZ
Springfield	Massachusetts	WDMR-LD	14 (23)	2018	TeleX, NBC True CRMZ, Oxygen
Paradise - Las Vegas	Nevada	KBLR	39 (20)	2005	TeleX, NBC True CRMZ, Cozi, Oxygen
Linden, New Jersey - New York	New York	WNJU	47 (35)	1984	TeleX
Santa Fe - Albuquerque	New Mexico	KASA-TV (Note: Owned by Ramar Communications prior to purchase by NBCUniversal in 2021.)	2 (27)	2021	TeleX, Roar, Cozi TV
Santa Fe - Albuquerque	New Mexico	KUPT-LD	2 (32)	2021	TeleX, NBC True CRMZ, Oxygen, Movies!, Roar, Cozi
Raleigh - Durham	North Carolina	WRTD-CD	54 (15)	2018	
Mount Laurel, New Jersey - Philadelphia	Pennsylvania	WWSI	62 (28)	2013	TeleX
San Juan	Puerto Rico	WKAQ-TV (Note: Since 2014, WKAQ-TV also carries a mainly WNBC-sourced NBC affiliate, NBC Puerto Rico, in English on their DT3 channel.)	2 (28)	1987	Spanish Independent, NBC (via WNBC in New York City), NBC True CRMZ
Providence	Rhode Island	WRIW-CD	51 (17)	2018	Cozi, Oxygen
Providence	Rhode Island	WYCN-LD (Note: This station was originally owned by Telemundo as its Boston station, W32AY, from 1995 to 2001. It was acquired by NBCUniversal in 2016 and served as the primary station for NBC Boston from 2017 to 2019 before being moved to Providence.)	8 (36)	2016	TeleX, Cozi, NBC True CRMZ
Dallas - Fort Worth	Texas	KXTX-TV	39 (36)	2001	TeleX
Galveston - Houston	Texas	KTMD	47 (22)	1987	TeleX, NBC True CRMZ, Cozi, Oxygen
Las Cruces, New Mexico - El Paso, Texas	Texas	KTDO	48 (26)	2018	TeleX, NBC True CRMZ
Rio Grande City - McAllen - Harlingen - Brownsville	Texas	KTLM	40 (14)	2013	TeleX, Cozi, NBC True CRMZ, Oxygen
San Antonio	Texas	KVDA	60 (15)	1989	TeleX, Cozi, NBC True CRMZ, Oxygen
Salt Lake City - Odgen	Utah	KTMW	20 (20)	2019	TeleX, Nosey, NBC True CRMZ, Oxygen
Salt Lake City - Odgen	Utah	KULX-CD (Repeater of KTMW)	10 (14)	2019	TeleX, Nosey, NBC True CRMZ, Oxygen
Salt Lake City - Odgen	Utah	KEJT-CD (Repeater of KTMW)	50 (21)	1993	TeleX, Nosey, NBC True CRMZ, Oxygen
Richmond	Virginia	WZTD-LD	45 (34)	2018	NBC True CRMZ, Oxygen

=== Former ===
City of license / Market	Station	Channel TV (RF)	Years owned	Current status
Phoenix	KPSW-LP	41	2002	Canal de la Fe affiliate, KPDF-CD, owned by HC2 Holdings.
Phoenix	KDRX-CA	48	2002-2006	Defunct
Phoenix	KPHZ-LP	58	2002-2006	Daystar owned-and-operated (O&O), KDTP-LP
Los Angeles	KWHY-TV	22 (4)	2001–2011	Scientology Network affiliate, KSCN-TV, owned by Sunset Boulevard Broadcasting
Steamboat Springs	KMAS-TV	24 (10)	2002–2007	KMHC, owned by Syncom Media Group
