= ZGS Communications =

American television and radio broadcast company

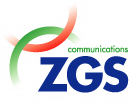
ZGS logo

ZGS Communications, also referred to as the ZGS Group or ZGS Broadcasting, was a television and radio station operator in the United States, based in Arlington, Virginia. The company operated 11 stations: 10 television stations and one radio station. All of their television stations and one radio station broadcast in Spanish.

On December 4, 2017, NBCUniversal's Telemundo Station Group announced its purchase of ZGS' 10 television stations.

The sale was completed in early 2018. Two of the stations (WRIW-CD and WZGS-CD) were filed separately, as ZGS were negotiating channel sharing agreements at the time of the sale. Those sales were completed in July 2018.

Effective April 10, 2018, ZGS sold their sole radio station to Alejandro Carrasco's ACR Media, Inc.

== Final stations ==
- Stations are arranged in alphabetical order by state and city of license.

Stations owned by ZGS Communications
Media market	State/District	Station	Purchased	Sold	Notes
Fresno	California	KNSO	2009	2014	(Note: Owned by NBCUniversal and operated by ZGS.)
Hartford–New Haven	Connecticut	WRDM-CD	2001	2018	
Washington, D.C.	District of Columbia	WILC	2004	2018	
Washington, D.C.	District of Columbia	WZDC-CD	1994	2018	
Fort Myers	Florida	WWDT-CD	2004	2018	
Orlando	Florida	WTMO-CD	1995	2018	
Tampa–St. Petersburg	Florida	WAMA	1998	2016	
Tampa–St. Petersburg	Florida	WGES	1991	2016	
Tampa–St. Petersburg	Florida	WRMD-CD	1991	2018	
Boston	Massachusetts	WNEU	2003	2014	
Boston	Massachusetts	WTMU-LP	2002	2016	
Springfield	Massachusetts	WDMR-LD	2001	2018	(Note: Satellite of WRDM-CD.)
Raleigh–Durham	North Carolina	WZGS-CD	2004	2018	
Philadelphia	Pennsylvania	WWSI	2008	2013	
Providence	Rhode Island	WRIW-CD	2003	2018	
El Paso	Texas	KTDO	2004	2018	
San Antonio	Texas	KVDA	2009	2014	
Richmond	Virginia	WZTD-LD	2007	2018	
