= First Night =

Artistic and cultural celebration on New Year's Eve

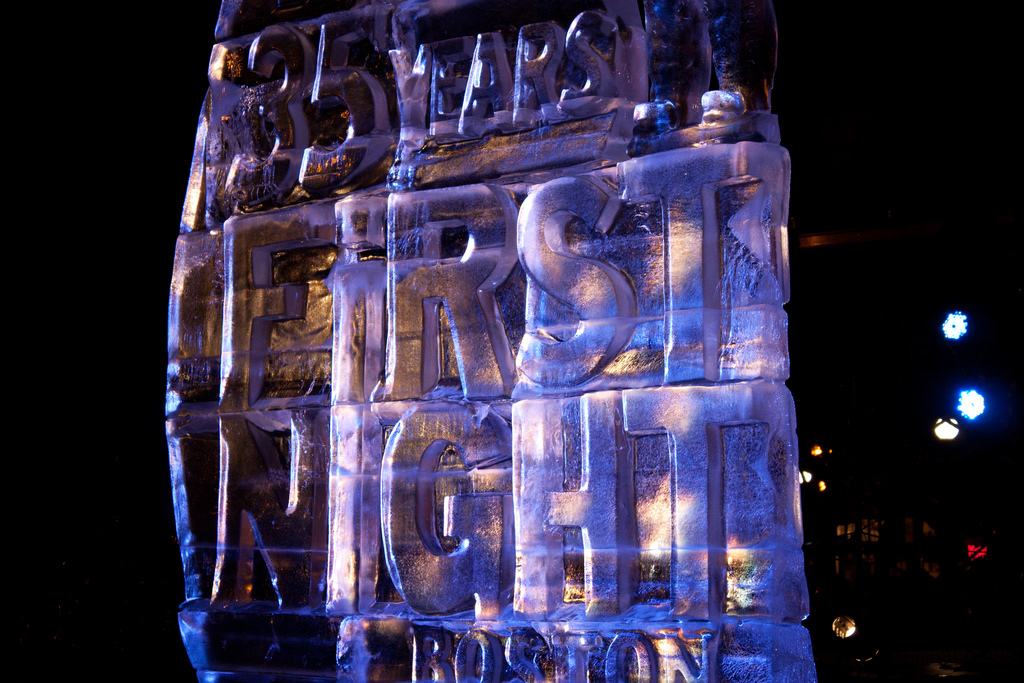
An ice sculpture at First Night Boston

First Night is a North American artistic and cultural celebration on New Year's Eve, taking place from afternoon until midnight. Some cities have all their events during the celebration outside, but some cities have events that are hosted indoors by organizations in the city, especially clustered in the local historic downtown which are easily walkable to each other, such as churches and theaters. The celebration is family-friendly and alcohol-free, serving as an alternative to conventional adult New Year's parties that are abundant with alcohol. Since it happens on New Year's Eve, First Night celebrations are actually held on the last night of the old year. First Night celebrates a community's local culture, often featuring music, dance, comedy, art, fireworks and, in some cities, ice sculptures and parades.

== Boston ==
First conceived by Clara Wainwright for the December 31, 1975 celebration in Boston, First Night organized a small group of artists and musicians seeking to perform on stages, both indoor and outdoor. The event also sought to avoid the emphasis on alcohol typical of New Year's Eve parties. Soon other surrounding communities started their own First Night celebrations. By the 1990s, the First Night Boston event was attracting works by over a thousand artists. In 2006, more than a million visitors attended First Night events, including free outdoor ice sculptures on Boston Common and in Copley Square, and waterfront fireworks.

Until 2015, live coverage of the final part of Boston's First Night, including the countdown to midnight and fireworks over Boston Harbor that begin at the stroke of midnight, was broadcast by WBZ-TV. CBS, the station's parent company, was an official sponsor.

In 2013, the non-profit First Night Boston organization closed for financial reasons, though Mayor Menino of Boston (in office for only another year) pledged to find private or public funding the January 2014 celebration. On November 11, 2013, Mayor Menino announced he had acquired the necessary funding and that the 2013 First Night would be “a bigger, brighter display than ever before.”

The city of Boston took over the First Night festivities in 2015 and hired an event planning firm to manage the smaller and scaled back event.

In 2016, television coverage of the festivities was transferred to NBCUniversal-owned properties including NECN, Telemundo owned station WNEU and newly acquired NBC owned station WBTS-LD; the latter used the event to help launch the station's NBC affiliation, which took effect on January 1, 2017.

There was no celebration in 2020 due to the COVID-19 pandemic.

== Other cities ==
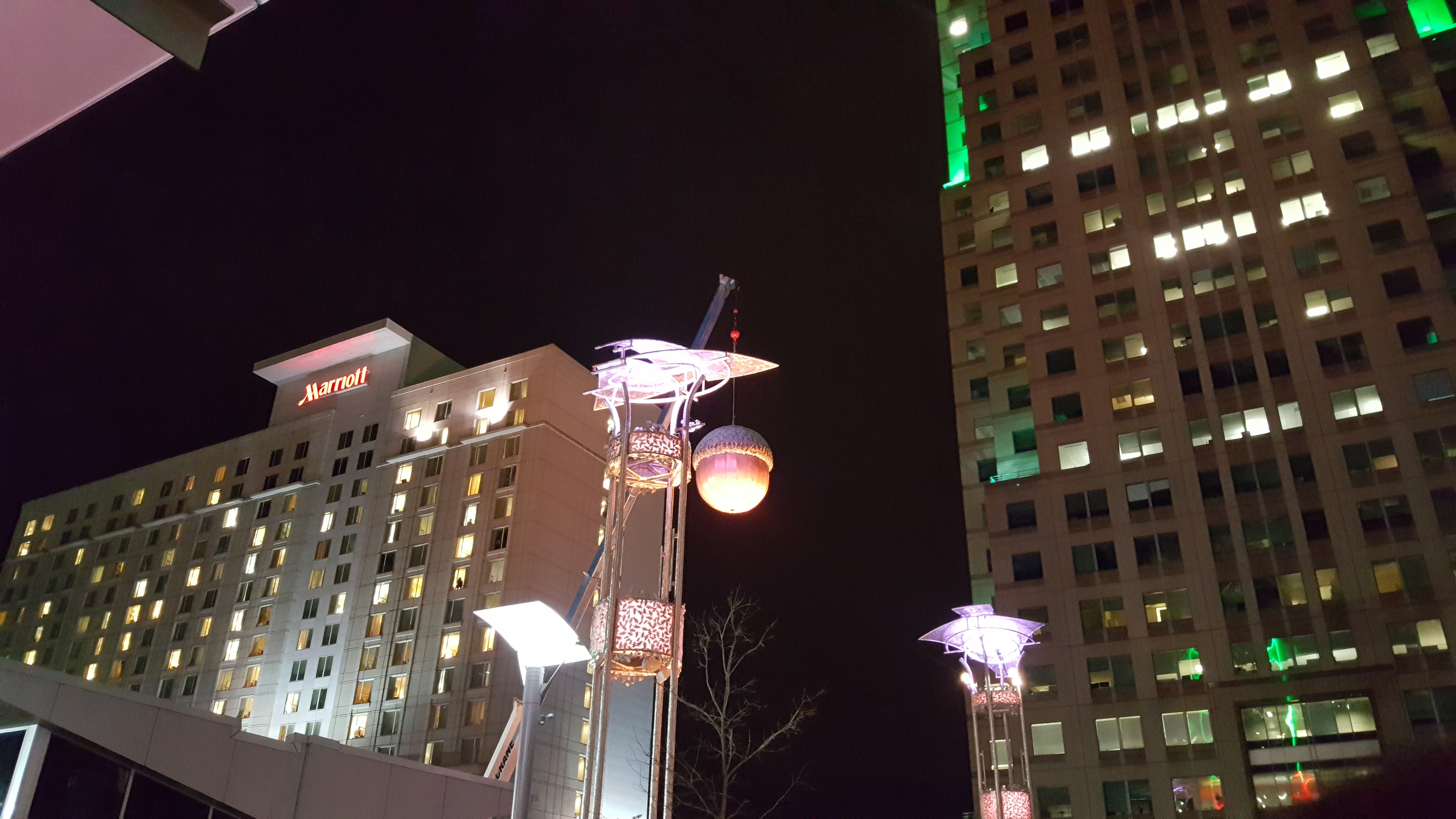
A "giant acorn" is lowered on First Night in Raleigh, North Carolina, nicknamed the City of Oaks.

By 1999, First Night celebrations were being held in more than 200 cities. In 2000, more than 260 cities had such a celebration. However, in 2001, 20 cities dropped out of the First Night celebrations due to the effects of the September 11 attacks and/or money difficulties.

During the Great Recession, which began in late 2007, many First Night celebrations faced financial difficulty, being scaled back or canceled.

There were about 45 cities with First Night celebrations happening on New Year's Eve 2013/2014.

As a result of the COVID-19 pandemic, starting on New Year's Eve 2020, First Night events were scaled back or cancelled in many cities and several places enforced measures such as wearing masks and social distancing.

== National organization ==
First Night USA is the national offshoot of the original Boston organization. It works with the numerous First Night licensed events throughout the United States.

Other celebrations on New Year's Eve, not labeled "First Night", have also sprung up. For example, in 2003, First Night Providence announced they planned to cancel future celebrations, which had been going on for 19 years. A group of local artists created Bright Night Providence, an artist-run New Year's Eve celebration based on the idea and spirit of First Night.
