= WZDC-CD =

Television station in Washington, D.C.

- Washington, D.C.; United States
- Channels: Digital: 34 (UHF), shared with WRC-TV; Virtual: 44
- Branding: Telemundo 44

Programming
- Affiliations: 44.1: Telemundo; 44.2: TeleXitos

Ownership
- Owner: Telemundo Station Group; (NBC Telemundo License LLC)
- Sister stations: WRC-TV

History
- First air date: April 1994
- Former call signs: W64BW (1993–1995); WZGS-LP (1995–2000); WZDC-LP (2000–2008); WZDC-CA (2008–2011)
- Former channel numbers: Analog: 64 (UHF, 1993–2007), 25 (UHF, 2007–2011); Digital: 25 (UHF, 2011–2018), 48 (UHF, 2018–2019); Virtual: 25 (2011–2018)
- Call sign meaning: ZGS District of Columbia (former owner)

Technical information
- Licensing authority: FCC
- Facility ID: 50347
- Class: CD
- ERP: 1,000 kW
- HAAT: 244 m (801 ft)
- Transmitter coordinates: 38°56′24″N 77°4′53″W

Links
- Public license information: Public file; LMS
- Website: www.telemundowashingtondc.com

WZDC-CD (channel 44) is a Class A television station in Washington, D.C., serving as the market's outlet for the Spanish-language network Telemundo. It is owned and operated by NBCUniversal's Telemundo Station Group alongside NBC outlet WRC-TV (channel 4). WZDC-CD and WRC-TV share studios and transmitter facilities on Nebraska Avenue in the Tenleytown neighborhood of northwest Washington.

Despite WZDC-CD legally holding a low-power Class A license, it transmits using sister station WRC-TV's full-power spectrum. This ensures complete reception across the Washington, D.C., television market. WZDC-CD also hosts the master control for sister station WRTD-CD in Raleigh, North Carolina, along with its public file link on WZDC's website.

== History ==
The station signed on as W64BW on UHF channel 64 in April 1994, as the Telemundo affiliate in the Washington market. On December 1, 1995, the call letters were changed to WZGS-LP, reflecting the station's ownership, ZGS Broadcasting. On June 27, 2000, the call letters were changed to WZDC-LP. On June 3, 2002, the station began producing Spanish-language local newscasts at 6 and 11 p.m. weeknights.

On April 10, 2007, WZDC-LP moved to channel 25, as channel 64 was to be removed from television broadcasting as a result of the 2009 digital television transition.

The station received class-A status in September 2008, changing callsigns to WZDC-CA to match. An application to build a new digital signal on channel 26 was dismissed in the same month. WZDC eventually received permission to flash-cut to digital on channel 25 in March 2011, and became WZDC-CD in doing so that September.

In the 2016–17 incentive auction, WZDC-CD received $66,182,037 to leave the air, though it indicated that it would maintain over-the-air coverage by entering into a post-auction channel sharing agreement.

On September 6, 2017, NBCUniversal internally announced that it would launch a Telemundo owned-and-operated station based out of WRC-TV (channel 4) in December; a Telemundo spokesperson stated that the sale of WZDC's spectrum "gave us the ability to take back the Telemundo affiliation for this market", without elaborating. Subsequently, on December 4, 2017, NBCUniversal's Telemundo Station Group announced its purchase of ZGS' 13 television stations, including WZDC-CD. As a result of the common ownership, WZDC-CD then entered into a channel-sharing agreement with WRC-TV, under which it ended broadcasts over its own signal on channel 25 and moved to WRC-TV's signal on channel 48. NBCUniversal assumed the operations of WZDC on January 1, 2018, through a local marketing agreement. The channel-sharing agreement with WRC-TV took effect on March 7, 2018, at which time WZDC shut off its own signal.

As the channel-share went into effect, WZDC's virtual channel number of 25 presented an issue. Virtual channel 25 is already in use by Hagerstown's WDVM-TV, which covers much of the western part of the Washington market and overlaps the signal of WRC-TV. The PSIP standard resolves virtual channel conflicts by assigning the new station a virtual channel number equal to the existing station's physical channel number. As WDVM-TV broadcast over physical channel 26 at the time, the rule would assign WZDC-CD virtual channel 26. However, WETA-TV already uses virtual channel 26 in the market, and there is no further remedy prescribed in the PSIP standard. NBC proposed as a second option virtual channel 64, corresponding to WZDC-CD's original analog channel. This introduced another conflict with WDPB, which overlaps the eastern portion of WRC-TV's coverage area. In this case, the same rule assigned virtual channel 44, which was available.

== Local programming ==
WZDC broadcasts 10 hours of locally produced newscasts each week, at 5 p.m., 6 p.m. and 11 p.m. on weekdays, along with morning cut-ins during Hoy Día.

Until the 2023 shift of MLS regional rights to Apple TV+, the station carried D.C. United games in Spanish on its TeleXitos subchannel, in tandem with English coverage on NBC Sports Washington.

== Subchannels ==
Subchannels of WRC-TV and WZDC-CD
License	Subchannel	Res.	Short name	Programming
WRC-TV	4.1	1080i	WRC-HD	NBC
WRC-TV	4.2	480i	COZI	Cozi TV
WRC-TV	4.3	480i	CRIMES	NBC True CRMZ
WRC-TV	4.4	480i	Oxygen	Oxygen
WZDC-CD	44.1	1080i	WZDC	Telemundo
WZDC-CD	44.2	480i	XITOS	TeleXitos
