= WPXG =

WPXG may refer to:

- WPXG-TV, a television station (channel 33) licensed to serve Concord, New Hampshire, United States
- WCWF, a television station (channel 21) licensed to serve Suring, Wisconsin, United States, which held the call sign WPXG from 1998 to 1999
- WTMO-CD, a television station (channel 31) licensed to serve Orlando, Florida, United States, which held the call sign WPXG-LP from 1999 to 2007
