= WNEU =

Television station in Merrimack, New Hampshire

- Merrimack–Manchester, New Hampshire; Boston, Massachusetts; United States
- City: Merrimack, New Hampshire
- Channels: Digital: 29 (UHF); Virtual: 60
- Branding: Telemundo Nueva Inglaterra; Noticiero Telemundo Nueva Inglaterra (newscasts)

Programming
- Affiliations: 60.1: Telemundo; for others, see § Subchannels

Ownership
- Owner: Telemundo Station Group; (NBC Telemundo License LLC)
- Sister stations: WBTS-CD; Cable: NECN, NBC Sports Boston

History
- First air date: August 14, 1987
- Former call signs: WGOT (1987–1998); WPXB (1998–2002)
- Former channel numbers: Analog: 60 (UHF, 1987–2009); Digital: 34 (UHF, 2002–2019)
- Former affiliations: Independent (1987–1995); inTV (1995–1998); Pax TV (1998–1999); Infomercials (1999–2000); ShopNBC (2000–2003); NBC (DT2, via WYCN-LD, 2017–2019)
- Call sign meaning: New England Telemundo

Technical information
- Licensing authority: FCC
- Facility ID: 51864
- ERP: 540 kW
- HAAT: 374 m (1,227 ft)
- Transmitter coordinates: 42°18′37″N 71°14′12″W

Links
- Public license information: Public file; LMS
- Website: www.telemundonuevainglaterra.com

WNEU (channel 60) is a television station licensed to Merrimack, New Hampshire, United States, serving as the Boston-area outlet for the Spanish-language network Telemundo. It is owned and operated by NBCUniversal's Telemundo Station Group alongside Nashua, New Hampshire–licensed Class A NBC station WBTS-CD (channel 15, formerly WYCN-CD), which shares spectrum with Boston-based PBS member station WGBX-TV (channel 44) to provide full-market coverage.

WNEU and WBTS-CD, along with co-owned regional cable news channel New England Cable News (NECN) and regional sports network NBC Sports Boston, share studios at the NBCU Boston Media Center on B Street in Needham, Massachusetts, with WNEU's transmitter in the same city, off Cedar Street.

WNEU's Telemundo programming was formerly simulcast by the low-power WYCN-LD (as analog WTMU-LP) as a translator. On January 1, 2017, WYCN-LD (as WBTS-LD) became an owned-and-operated NBC station known as "NBC Boston", replacing previous affiliate WHDH (channel 7). In October 2019, WYCN-LD moved its transmitter to Norton, Massachusetts, and became the Telemundo station for Providence, Rhode Island.

== History ==
=== Early years ===
The station first signed on the air August 14, 1987, as WGOT, an independent station owned by Golden Triangle TV 60 Corporation. The call sign was derived from the so-called "Golden Triangle" region that encompasses Manchester, Nashua and Salem, New Hampshire. Neal Cortell, who owned 50 percent of WGOT, had earlier owned a stake in WXPO-TV (channel 50, now occupied by WWJE-DT).

Paugus Television bought WGOT for $1.35 million on January 13, 1989. In the early 1990s, WGOT unsuccessfully attempted to become New Hampshire's Fox affiliate; in 1991, Paugus filed an antitrust lawsuit against Fox, its Boston affiliate WFXT (channel 25), and the Boston Celtics (who owned WFXT at the time) for conspiring to block WGOT from joining the network, as well as using Fox programming and WFXT's Celtics broadcasts to place channel 60 at a disadvantage in obtaining cable carriage. Another attempt at obtaining a Fox affiliation for the station ended in November 1994, after Fox attempted to instead lure ABC affiliate WMUR-TV (channel 9).

=== As WPXB ===
Paxson Communications purchased WGOT from Paugus for $3.05 million on May 17, 1995, and switched the station to a mix of infomercials and religious programming, as an affiliate of the Infomall TV Network (inTV). Paxson referred to WGOT as inTV's Boston affiliate; however, the channel 60 signal did not reach the city. To solve this, Paxson bought WRAP-LP (channel 33) in Gloucester from Electron Communications on October 31, 1996, moved the station to channel 54 in Boston under the callsign W54CN, and brought it to the air that November as a translator of WGOT. In December 2000, W54CN moved to channel 40 as W40BO.

WGOT changed its call sign to WPXB on January 20, 1998, and subsequently became a charter owned-and-operated station of Pax TV (now Ion Television) when it launched on August 31, 1998; WPXB split the Boston affiliation for the network with WBPX (channel 46, now WWDP) in Norwell. However, the station dropped Pax programming in June 1999 after DP Media (whose owner, Devon Paxson, was the son of Paxson Communications founder Bud Paxson) took over WABU (channel 68, now WBPX-TV) and made it Boston's new Pax station; WABU operated a satellite in New Hampshire, WNBU (channel 21, now WPXG-TV) in Concord. WPXB then returned to an infomercial format; on November 1, 2000, the station switched to ValueVision, which later became ShopNBC.

=== As WNEU ===
In September 2002, NBC agreed to acquire WPXB from Paxson for $26 million, with the intention of making channel 60 an owned-and-operated station of its Telemundo network. Paxson, which was in the process of selling some of its stations in order to raise $100 million, had originally planned to sell WPXB to another company, but NBC had a right of first refusal on Paxson's stations in the fifty largest markets, which it had obtained when it acquired a 32 percent stake in Paxson in 1999. NBC completed its purchase of WPXB on October 29, 2002; two days later, the call letters were changed to WNEU. Translator station W40BO was not included in the sale; Paxson eventually made channel 40 a translator of WBPX. Channel 60 continued to air ShopNBC programming until April 2003, while ValueVision Media (ShopNBC's parent company) was in the process of acquiring WWDP to move ShopNBC there; WNEU switched to Telemundo that month.

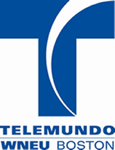
Former WNEU logo, used from 2008 to 2012

Concurrently with the station joining Telemundo, WNEU entered into a joint sales and time brokerage agreement with ZGS Communications, owner of existing Telemundo affiliate WTMU-LP (then on channel 32). During this time, WNEU effectively served as a full-power satellite of WTMU-LP, even though channel 60 was promoted as the main station. The local marketing agreement with ZGS expired in April 2014; at that time, NBCUniversal retook full control of WNEU and placed the station in its Telemundo Station Group.

=== Boston cluster ===
On January 7, 2016, Valari Staab, president of NBC Owned Television Stations, announced that NBC had declined to renew its affiliation with incumbent affiliate WHDH beyond the end of 2016, and would launch a new NBC owned-and-operated station on January 1, 2017, known as "NBC Boston" and led by NECN and Telemundo Boston's general manager Mike St. Peter. It was rumored that NBC would be moved to WNEU, however Staab did not outright confirm whether WNEU would carry NBC programming, but iterated that the network would remain available over-the-air following the transition, and that NBCUniversal was "committed to expanding our over-the-air coverage of the market and are currently looking at a variety of options to accomplish that".

Unlike WHDH, whose signal radius is located directly over Boston, WNEU's signal only overlapped with the northwest portion of WHDH's signal. This prompted complaints by WHDH's owner, Sunbeam Television, which later sued Comcast under allegations that the affiliate switch violated FCC conditions on Comcast's acquisition of NBC, by reducing over-the-air coverage of the network and using its cable holdings to influence affiliation negotiations. The lawsuit was thrown out in May 2016.

In September 2016, NBCUniversal agreed to acquire WTMU-LP (subsequently renamed WBTS-LD)—WNEU's low-power translator in Needham, Massachusetts, which the company said would factor into its plan to broadcast the new service over-the-air into Boston. On November 1, 2016, NBCUniversal officially announced that NBC Boston would be simulcast on WBTS-LD, WNEU-DT2 and WMFP-DT5 when it launched on January 1, 2017.

Until 2019, WNEU maintained a main studio facility in Manchester in the Sundial Center, a redevelopment of a former Foster Grant factory; it was little-used for actual broadcast purposes and was mainly used as a local repository for the station's public file and as a public contact point. With the repeal of the FCC's Main Studio Rule and the opening of the new NBCU Boston Media center at the start of 2020 which combined it, NBC Boston, and NECN into a modern facility, NBC and Telemundo departed the Sundial Center that year.

In 2025, WNEU broadcast two Boston Celtics games. The games, which aired in English on sister channel NBC Sports Boston, featured commentary from Jesús Quiñones and Giddel Padilla.

== Newscasts ==
In the early 1990s, WGOT aired a New Hampshire-oriented prime time newscast at 10 p.m. that was anchored by current NHDOT spokesperson Bill Boynton. The newscast, which started in August 1991, was discontinued in June 1994; the cancellation was due to insufficient profits, as well as limited interest in a New Hampshire newscast from northern Massachusetts viewers that received the station on cable. WGOT would continue to air news briefs and news specials until the sale to Paxson Communications.

On June 11, 2015, NBCUniversal announced that it would launch early evening and late newscasts for WNEU. The news operation shares resources with sister channel New England Cable News and operates out of NECN's studios, at the time located in Newton, Massachusetts. Unlike competitor WUNI (channel 27), which aired a repeat of its 6 p.m. newscast at 11 p.m., the 11 p.m. newscast on WNEU would be live. The newscasts launched on August 17, 2015.

On December 15, 2017, NBCUniversal announced that WNEU's newscasts would be rebranded from Noticiero Telemundo Boston to Noticiero Telemundo Nueva Inglaterra to reflect an expansion of the news operation's reach to include all of New England. NBC concurrently announced that the newscasts would be simulcast on WRDM-CD in Hartford, Connecticut (along with Springfield repeater WDMR-LD), which they acquired from ZGS Communications in February 2018; a reporter based at WRDM's facilities at the WVIT studios in West Hartford files stories from Connecticut (outside of the WNJU-covered Fairfield County) and the Pioneer Valley. WRIW-CD in Providence, Rhode Island, began simulcasting WNEU's newscasts on July 20, 2018, after NBC completed its acquisition of that station from ZGS.

== Technical information ==
=== Subchannels ===
The station's signal is multiplexed:

Subchannels of WNEU
Subchannel	Res.	Short name	Programming
15.3	480i	A CRIME	NBC True CRMZ
15.4	480i	Oxygen	Oxygen
60.1	1080i	WNEU-DT	Telemundo
60.2	480i	Xitos	TeleXitos
66.1	720p	WUNI-DT	Univision (WUNI)

Broadcast on behalf of another station

=== Analog-to-digital conversion ===
WNEU shut down its analog signal, over UHF channel 60, on June 12, 2009, the official date on which full-power television stations in the United States transitioned from analog to digital broadcasts under federal mandate. The station's digital signal continued to broadcast on its pre-transition UHF channel 34, using virtual channel 60.

== See also ==
- WYCN-LD
- WBTS-CD
