= WYCN-LD =

Television station in Providence, Rhode Island

- Providence, Rhode Island; United States
- Channels: Digital: 36 (UHF); Virtual: 8
- Branding: Telemundo Providence; Noticiero Telemundo Nueva Inglaterra (newscasts)

Programming
- Affiliations: 8.1: Telemundo; for others, see § Subchannels

Ownership
- Owner: Telemundo Station Group; (Station Venture Operations, LP)
- Sister stations: WNEU, WBTS-CD, WVIT, WRDM-CD, NECN, NBC Sports Boston

History
- First air date: April 3, 1995 (in Boston, Massachusetts; license moved to Providence in 2019)
- Former call signs: W32AY (1995–2002); WTMU-LP (2002–2016); WBTS-LD (2016–2019)
- Former channel numbers: Analog: 32 (UHF, 1995–2004), 67 (UHF, 2004–2010), 46 (UHF, 2010–2016); Digital: 46 (UHF, 2016–2019)
- Former affiliations: Telemundo (1995–2016); Independent (2016–2017); NBC (2017–2019)
- Call sign meaning: "We're Your Community Network" (former branding for the current WBTS-CD under Nashua community broadcasting format)

Technical information
- Licensing authority: FCC
- Facility ID: 64996
- ERP: 12.655 kW
- HAAT: 43.7 m (143 ft)
- Transmitter coordinates: 41°59′49.4″N 71°9′14.3″W
- Translator(s): WRIW-CD 51 Providence

Links
- Public license information: LMS
- Website: www.telemundonuevainglaterra.com/noticias/local/rhode-island/

WYCN-LD (channel 8) is a low-power television station in Providence, Rhode Island, United States, broadcasting the Spanish-language network Telemundo. Owned and operated by NBCUniversal's Telemundo Station Group, the station has studios on Kenney Drive in Cranston, Rhode Island (shared with NBC/ABC affiliate WJAR (channel 10), owned by Sinclair Broadcast Group), and its transmitter is located on East Main Street in Norton, Massachusetts.

Originally licensed to Boston, the station was founded in 1995 as W32AY by the Spanish-language television network Telemundo (which was then under separate ownership). Later, as WTMU-LP, it carried that network as a translator of Merrimack, New Hampshire–licensed WNEU (channel 60), whose signal did not reach the city of Boston.

On January 7, 2016, NBC Owned Television Stations President Valari Staab confirmed that NBC had declined to renew its affiliation with Boston-based WHDH (channel 7), and that it planned to launch an owned-and-operated outlet to be known as NBC Boston on January 1, 2017. At the time, NBC did not announce which station(s) would be used to carry the new service over-the-air, and WHDH's owner Sunbeam Television sued NBCUniversal under the presumption that it planned to only use WNEU, contending that doing so would have considerably reduced the ability of viewers to receive the network over the air in Boston, thus bolstering the cable services provided by NBCUniversal's parent company Comcast in the area.

On August 31, 2016, NBCUniversal filed to acquire the low-power station from its owner ZGS Communications. The following month, ZGS filed a request to the Federal Communications Commission (FCC) to upgrade the station to a digital signal. NBC later announced that the station, renamed WBTS-LD, would serve as the main station of the NBC Boston service as part of a simulcast with WNEU-DT2 (virtual channel 60.2). Until April 1, 2018, NBC also leased a subchannel of WMFP (virtual channel 60.5) in Lawrence, to provide a full-power signal for viewers in the Boston area. On January 18, 2018, it started an additional transmission service in the Boston area through a channel sharing agreement with PBS member station WGBX-TV (channel 44), under the license of WYCN-CD (now WBTS-CD).

Due to its low-power status and transmitter location (roughly equidistant between Providence and Boston), WYCN-LD's broadcast radius does not cover the entire Providence metropolitan area. It is therefore simulcast in widescreen standard definition on Class A translator station WRIW-CD (channel 51), which shares spectrum with full-power PBS member WPVD-TV (channel 36).

== W32AY, WTMU-LP: Telemundo for Boston ==
The station first signed on the air in April 1995 as W32AY, operating on UHF channel 32 from the Prudential Tower in Boston as an owned-and-operated station for Telemundo. In September 2000, the station began to simulcast its programming on WWDP (channel 46), giving it a chance to better compete with Univision affiliate WUNI (channel 27), the established Spanish-language station in the area. Telemundo sold W32AY to ZGS Communications in 2001. In February 2002, W32AY changed its call letters to WTMU-LP, and on July 1, WWDP discontinued its relay of the station's programming.

In December 2002, NBC (which had acquired Telemundo in 2001) purchased WPXB (channel 60, now WNEU); WNEU began to carry Telemundo programming as a satellite of WTMU in April 2003.

WTMU went off-the-air in 2004, as the channel 32 allocation had been assigned to WBPX for its digital signal, and the station's attempt to move to channel 67 was hindered by interference from WBPX's analog signal on channel 68. WTMU resumed broadcasting operations in December 2006; it reduced its effective radiated power and relocated its transmitter to a tower in Medford to alleviate the interference.

Although low-power stations were exempt from the 2009 analog shutdown that full-service stations were subject to, WTMU initiated plans for a digital signal on October 27, 2006, by applying for a construction permit for a digital companion channel on VHF channel 3. On August 28, 2008, WTMU changed its plans and applied to flash-cut to channel 42, which was to have become available after WHDH moved its digital signal to VHF channel 7; the original application was dismissed by the FCC on March 27, 2009, but a new application was filed on May 21. A move was necessary, as the spectrum that channel 67 is located within had been auctioned off and was being removed from the television bandplan as a result of the transition.

Before WTMU's application could be approved, WHDH requested to return its digital signal to channel 42, leading WTMU to withdraw its application for the channel on August 24 and filing instead to move to channel 46; the FCC dismissed the channel 42 application on August 26, 2009, at the same time also canceling the construction permit for the previously proposed digital companion channel. In the meantime, WTMU was unable to get a digital signal on the air before being forced to terminate the analog signal on April 9, 2010, resulting in the station suspending operations. To avoid losing its license due to not broadcasting for a year, WTMU resumed broadcasting on April 4, 2011, using its existing analog facilities but operating on channel 46 under special temporary authority (STA). It again suspended operations on April 9, but returned to the air on March 14, 2012.

== NBC10 Boston ==
Over the course of the early 2010s, NBC made major investments in its Boston-area operations. The two stations moved into a new facility in Newton, Massachusetts, and in August 2015, WNEU debuted local newscasts for the first time in its history. This prompted speculation in the industry that NBC was preparing to take the network affiliation from WHDH (channel 7) after its existing agreement expired at the end of 2016. In a feature article, Broadcasting & Cable described Boston as a "treasured quarry" for NBC and noted that WHDH's owner, Sunbeam Television president Edmund Ansin, had no desire to sell. There had been disagreements between NBC and WHDH, most notably in 2009 when Ansin threatened to preempt The Jay Leno Show, a nightly 10 p.m. talk show, for local news. Ansin later revealed that he had turned down a $200 million offer from NBC for the station in September 2015. On October 1, 2015, The Boston Globe reported that NBC had considered moving the affiliation to NECN rather than to a broadcast channel, though this was seen as impractical for legal reasons and because NECN's coverage extended beyond the Boston market.

On December 15, 2015, New England One reported, citing internal sources, that NBCUniversal had declined to renew its affiliation with WHDH and was in the process of preparing WNEU to become an NBC owned-and-operated station by expanding its news operation, including hiring former WHDH meteorologist Pete Bouchard. The Boston Herald reported two days later that the station would prospectively be branded as NBC Boston and that WNEU's existing Telemundo programming could be moved to a different subchannel. Following the reports, Paul Magnes, WHDH's vice president and general manager, told the Herald that the station still expected its NBC affiliation to be renewed, while NBCUniversal declined to comment.

On January 7, 2016, Valari Staab, president of NBC Owned Television Stations, confirmed that NBC had declined to renew its affiliation with WHDH beyond the end of 2016 and would launch NBC Boston on January 1, 2017. Staab cited NBC's investments in NECN and WNEU as providing the basis for the company to launch its own NBC station in the market. At the time, no specifics were given as to broadcast carriage for the new NBC Boston service.

Sunbeam mounted a defense of its NBC affiliation in public. In court, Ansin argued that WNEU's transmitter, which was not centrally located at the time, did not provide adequate coverage and served 4 million fewer people. Shortly before the launch of NBC Boston was confirmed, Ansin told The Globe, "No network has elected to give up such a strong station and go to a startup station". On March 10, 2016, Sunbeam Television sued Comcast in the District Court for the District of Massachusetts. It argued that moving NBC to WNEU would violate antitrust law, by strengthening its near-monopoly position in the market, as well as conditions imposed by the Federal Communications Commission (FCC) on Comcast's acquisition of NBC, as the company had agreed not to reduce over-the-air coverage of NBC or use its cable holdings to influence affiliation negotiations. On May 16, 2016, the lawsuit was dismissed; the judge found that the signal issue was "not a concern that WHDH has standing to redress" and noted, "[A]bsent any actionable harm attributable to Comcast, it is simply an indurate consequence of doing business in a competitive and unsentimental marketplace."

During this time, it was unclear how NBC Boston would be broadcast to viewers, and NBC was linked to several options, including acquiring WBPX-TV (channel 68) from Ion Television or WFXT (channel 25), Boston's Fox affiliate, from Cox Television. On August 31, 2016, NBC moved a step closer to securing signals for NBC Boston by agreeing to buy WTMU-LP from ZGS Communications for $100,000. Concurrently, ZGS entered into a local programming and marketing agreement with another NBCUniversal subsidiary—WBTS Television, LLC—to operate WTMU-LP. The sale was approved by the FCC on October 28 and completed on November 4. The acquisition, though not specifying WTMU-LP, was announced as part of NBC's coverage plan. The station's call sign was changed to WBTS-LD on October 6; on October 25, the station received FCC approval to change its major virtual channel to 8. (Note: This was necessary for a variety of reasons. WTMU-LP had broadcast on analog channel 46. Major virtual channel 46 was unavailable because of WWDP, which had also broadcast on channel 46. The ATSC standards specify that the first option in this case is to use the physical channel number of the other station, in this case 10. However, the new digital signal overlapped another station using major channel 10, WJAR-TV in Providence, Rhode Island.)

=== Launch ===
The Countdown NBC Boston logo used from November 10, 2016, to December 31, 2016

On November 1, 2016, NBCUniversal officially announced that it would broadcast NBC Boston on WBTS-LD and a subchannel of WNEU, as well as details surrounding the station's launch programming and news department. General manager Mike St. Peter pointed out that, although the two stations combined would not have the same over-the-air coverage as WHDH, 97% of viewers in the Boston market were pay television subscribers, and NBC would "continue to look for how we can improve over-the-air service". On November 10, the stations launched a transitional programming service branded as Countdown NBC Boston. Designed to promote the switch and assist viewers in locating NBC Boston's over-the-air channels, the service featured NBC Boston's future syndicated programming, programs from Cozi TV, and newscasts from NECN. The NBC Boston website and social media outlets were also launched at this time. To further improve coverage, on December 12, NBC announced that it had leased a subchannel on WMFP in Lawrence.

The NBC affiliation switch in Boston also affected many cable systems in Atlantic Canada, which use Boston-market TV stations to provide the major U.S. networks. The Canadian Radio-television and Telecommunications Commission (CRTC) received an application from Bell Canada to distribute WBTS in November 2016; the request was approved by the CRTC on December 20, 2016, and on January 1, 2017, NBC Boston replaced WHDH on a variety of cable and satellite systems in the region.

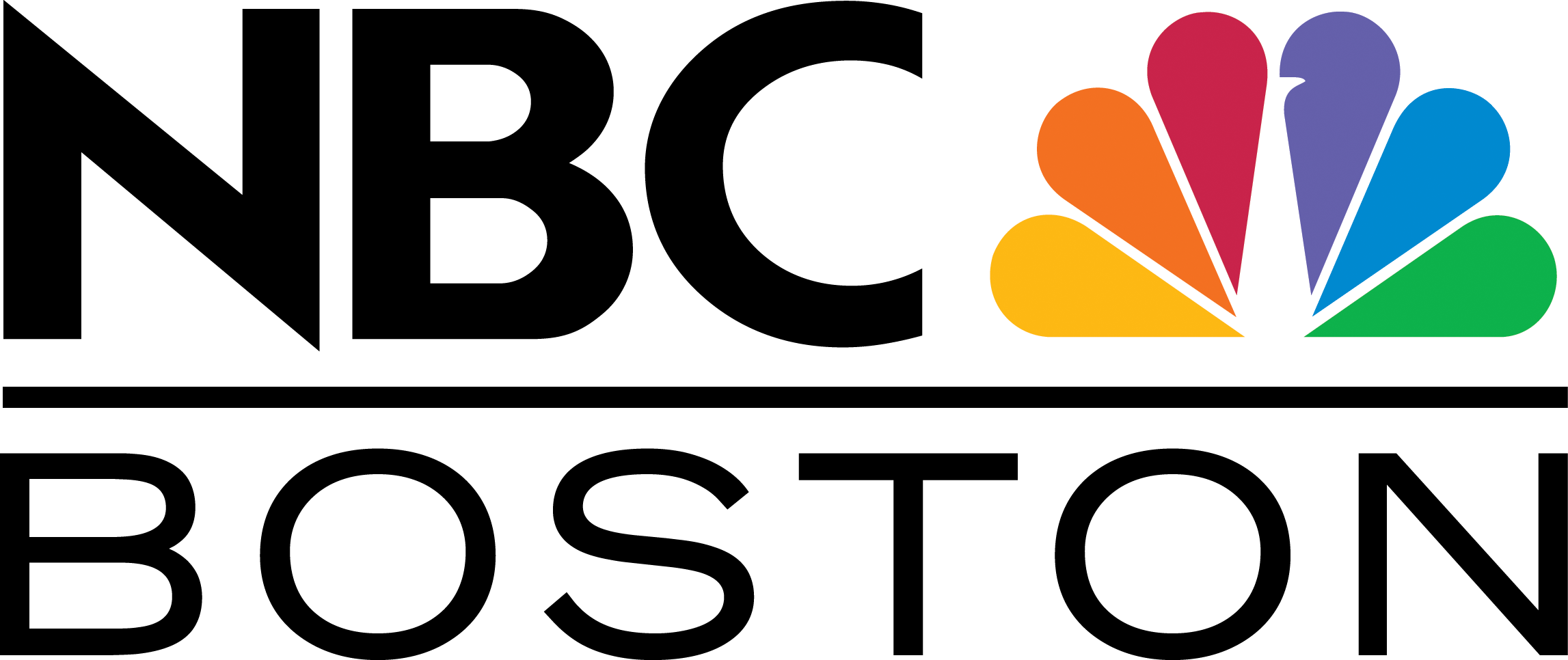
Logo used as NBC Boston

NBC Boston assumed the NBC affiliation at 3 a.m. on January 1, 2017. The previous night, its news anchors, Phil Lipof and Shannon Mulaire, led coverage of Boston's First Night New Year's Eve festivities.

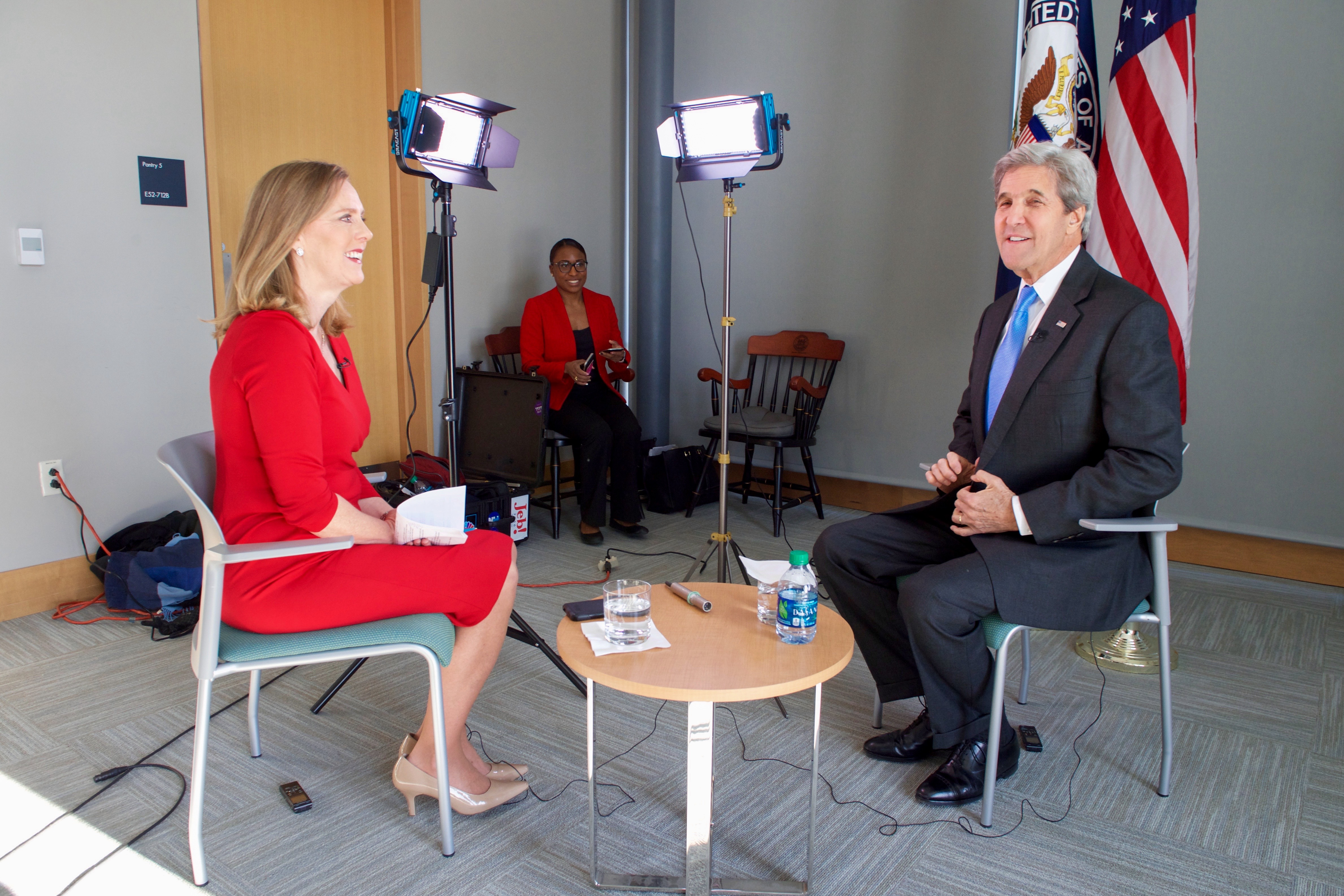
NBC Boston reporter Alison King interviews John Kerry in January 2017

Analysts described NBC's move as a gamble given the ratings strength of WHDH and the need to educate viewers on where NBC programming could be seen, particularly given that there was no one channel to promote. Promotion ahead of the launch included audio and transit advertising as well as pop-up events where news anchors handed out hot chocolate at shopping centers. The station was rebranded as NBC10 Boston at the start of 2018, emphasizing its cable channel number.

=== Another signal switch ===
The broadcast incentive auction held later in 2017 led to further changes as a number of Boston-area television stations sold their spectrum and agreed to share channels with other broadcasters. Among these stations was WMFP, which entered into a channel sharing agreement with WWDP, whose signal is marginal in Boston and other areas to the north.

On October 18, 2017, NBC agreed to purchase WYCN-CD, a Nashua, New Hampshire–based Class A station that had also sold its spectrum in the auction. Prior to the sale, WYCN-CD owner OTA Broadcasting entered into a channel sharing agreement with the WGBH Educational Foundation to broadcast WYCN-CD on the transmitter of WGBX-TV, a full-power Boston signal. The sale of WYCN-CD to NBC was completed on January 18, 2018; the station began channel-sharing with WGBX the same day. The WMFP simulcast ended at midnight on April 1, 2018; WMFP began channel sharing with WWDP on September 7. The feed on WYCN-CD was assigned major channel number 15. (Note: The WGBX-TV signal overlaps with WGME (virtual channel 13, physical channel 15) in Portland, Maine, thus the use of 15.)

On August 8, 2019, WBTS-LD (channel 8) and WYCN-CD swapped call signs, with channel 8 becoming WYCN-LD and channel 15 changing to WBTS-CD.

On August 31, 2019, WYCN-LD shut down its RF channel 46 transmitter; that October, it moved to channel 36, relocated its transmitter to Norton, Massachusetts, switched from NBC to Telemundo, and changed its city of license to Providence, Rhode Island, leaving WBTS-CD as Boston's sole NBC station.

== Technical information ==
=== Subchannels ===
The station's signal is multiplexed:

Subchannels of WYCN-LD
| Subchannel | Res. | Short name | Programming |
|---|---|---|---|
| 8.1 | 1080i | WYCN-LD | Telemundo |
| 8.2 | 480i | XTOS | TeleXitos |
| 8.3 | 480i | Cozi | Cozi TV |
| 8.4 | 480i | | NBC True CRMZ |
