= KVDA =

Television station in San Antonio

- San Antonio, Texas; United States
- Channels: Digital: 15 (UHF); Virtual: 60
- Branding: Telemundo 60 San Antonio; Noticias 60 Telemundo (newscasts)

Programming
- Affiliations: 60.1: Telemundo; for others, see § Subchannels

Ownership
- Owner: Telemundo Station Group; (NBC Telemundo License LLC)

History
- First air date: September 10, 1989
- Former channel numbers: Analog: 60 (UHF, 1989–2009); Digital: 38 (UHF, 2009-2020)
- Call sign meaning: Vida, the Spanish word for "life"

Technical information
- Licensing authority: FCC
- Facility ID: 64969
- ERP: 805 kW
- HAAT: 451 m (1,480 ft)
- Transmitter coordinates: 29°17′39″N 98°15′32″W

Links
- Public license information: Public file; LMS
- Website: www.telemundosanantonio.com

KVDA (channel 60) is a television station in San Antonio, Texas, United States, serving as the market's local outlet for the Spanish-language network Telemundo. The station is owned and operated by NBCUniversal's Telemundo Station Group and maintains studios on San Pedro Avenue in North Central San Antonio, near the enclave of Olmos Park; its transmitter is located off US 181 northeast of Elmendorf.

KVDA has been a Telemundo station since it signed on in September 1989. The network financed its construction by a group of local businessmen and then bought the station within a year of its launch. In local news ratings, KVDA has typically lagged its primary competitor, Univision station KWEX-DT.

== History ==
In April 1985, the Federal Communications Commission (FCC) designated a total of 13 applications for channel 60 in San Antonio for comparative hearing. Six dropped out, and seven groups were in contention during the hearing process: Vela Broadcasting, San Antonio Video Corporation, TV 60 Limited Partnership, Amistad Communications of the Southwest, Pro 60 Communications, San Antonio Broadcasting, and David A. Dávila et al. doing business as Nueva Vista Productions. Two groups featured people familiar in San Antonio. San Antonio Video included U.S. representative Albert Bustamante and several San Antonio lawyers, while one of the shareholders in Nueva Vista Productions was former KENS-TV investigative reporter Ed Gonzalez. The FCC's initial decision, released in November 1986, rejected four applications for inability to secure reasonable assurance of a tower site; declared San Antonio Video "not qualified to become a licensee" because of misrepresentations about its financial qualifications; and chose Nueva Vista over Vela because of greater integration of ownership and management. Appeals from some of the losing applicants delayed a final grant into 1988.

In June 1988, Nueva Vista Productions agreed to accept financing from the Telemundo network in exchange for affiliating with it when the station went on air, a deal announced in October 1988. Shortly after, a general manager was named, and work began on locating the studios and transmitter. Sites had been selected for both by May 1989; the 21,000-square-foot (2,000 m^{2}) studio building at San Pedro Avenue and Recoleta Street had previously housed Offices to Go.

The station first signed on the air on September 10, 1989. The next month, Telemundo moved to buy KVDA outright, utilizing a right of first refusal within 18 months of the station beginning broadcasting. Two months after going on the air, Gonzalez challenged Telemundo's attempt to immediately buy the station, noting that Nueva Vista had been loaned money by Telemundo to build channel 60 in exchange for an option agreement giving Telemundo the option to buy the company outright, which he alleged represented an unauthorized transfer of control pacted before the comparative hearing had been resolved. The FCC granted the transfer in August 1990, finding that Dávila and not Telemundo had been the principal party making decisions as to the station's construction such as selecting the studio and transmitter sites and hiring staff.

In a deal announced in 2001 and completed in April 2002. NBC acquired the Telemundo network, including KVDA, from Sony and Liberty Media for $2.7 billion in cash and assumption of debt. On May 1, 2009, ZGS Communications took over the operations of KVDA and its Fresno, California, sister station KNSO under time brokerage agreements, with NBCUniversal retaining the licenses to both stations. In 2014, NBC reassumed the operations of KVDA.

== News operation ==
After airing local news breaks at launch, KVDA began airing a 10 p.m. local newscast in February 1990. At one point, it was the only such newscast, as competitor KWEX-TV had dropped its late evening news for financial reasons. After initially debuting a call-in program, Línea Directa, at 5 p.m., it was replaced with a full-on early newscast in 1994. Ratings were generally low, particularly for the 10 p.m. news once KWEX returned to the time slot. As a result, in January 1997, the 10 p.m. news was changed to a repeat of the 5 p.m. broadcast, and a third of the news staff was fired; news director Víctor Landa also began to anchor the newscast. Accompanying a revamp of the network's prime time schedule in September 1998, the station returned to producing two live newscasts.

In an attempt to compete with KWEX, the newscasts were retooled in 2000 under the new moniker Sesenta Directo (60 Direct); it also experimented with community journalists who received a computer and a webcam to report on stories in their areas. Additionally, the station debuted a 6 a.m. morning newscast early the next year. However, in a cost-cutting move in July 2001, the morning and 5 p.m. newscasts were canceled, leaving KVDA with only a 10 p.m. newscast on weeknights, and several on-air and production staffers were laid off. The 5 p.m. news was later reinstated, but local news from San Antonio was cut back when a cost-cutting move led to the replacement of most of Telemundo's local newscasts in the western United States with a centralized program produced from KXTX-TV in Fort Worth.

Under ZGS management, on May 21, 2012, KVDA relaunched in-house news operations with the debut of half-hour evening newscasts at 5 and 10 p.m. on Mondays through Fridays, that are produced at the station's San Pedro Avenue studios; the locally produced newscasts have been broadcast in high definition from the news department's launch.

Beginning in 2014, a series of local news expansions at Telemundo have added hours of news to KVDA's output. A 4:30 p.m. show debuted at KVDA and 13 other Telemundo stations in 2014. A 4 p.m. half-hour was added in 2016, again as part of a national expansion in the group. Weekend newscasts debuted in 2017, and a midday newscast was introduced in January 2018 in San Antonio and nine other cities. Despite the expansions, KVDA has failed to surpass KWEX in news ratings.

In September 2022, Telemundo started the regional morning newscast Noticiero Telemundo Texas, originating in Fort Worth and airing on Telemundo's owned-and-operated stations in the state and most of its affiliates. Additionally, two Gray Television-owned Telemundo stations, in Odessa and Laredo, began simulcasting the 4 p.m. half-hour of KVDA's news as a lead-in to their own local news coverage. On November 1, 2024, Noticias Telemundo Texas was discontinued.

=== Notable former on-air staff ===
- Patricio G. Espinoza – founding news director/anchor/Texas correspondent

== Technical information ==
=== Subchannels ===
KVDA is broadcast from a transmitter located off US 181 northeast of Elmendorf. Its signal is multiplexed:

Subchannels of KVDA
Subchannel	Res.	Short name	Programming
60.1	1080i	KVDA-DT	Telemundo
60.2	480i	Exitos	TeleXitos
60.3	480i	COZI	Cozi TV
60.4	480i	CRIMES	NBC True CRMZ
60.5	480i	OXYGEN	Oxygen
12.2	480i	Me-TV	MeTV (KSAT-TV)

Broadcast on behalf of another station

=== Analog-to-digital conversion ===
KVDA ended regular programming on its analog signal, over UHF channel 60, on June 12, 2009, the official date on which full-power television stations in the United States transitioned from analog to digital broadcasts under federal mandate. The station's digital signal remained on its pre-transition UHF channel 38, using virtual channel 60. KVDA relocated its signal from RF channel 38 to RF channel 15 on May 1, 2020, as a result of the 2016 United States wireless spectrum auction.
