= WRMD =

WRMD may refer to:

- WRMD-CD, a television station (channel 30, virtual 49) licensed to serve Tampa, Florida, United States
- WGES (AM), a radio station (680 AM) licensed to serve St. Petersburg, Florida, which held the call sign WRMD from 1991 to 2006
