= WRMD-CD =

Television station in Tampa, Florida

- Tampa–St. Petersburg, Florida; United States
- City: Tampa, Florida
- Channels: Digital: 30 (UHF); Virtual: 49
- Branding: Telemundo 49

Programming
- Affiliations: 49.1: Telemundo; for others, see § Subchannels

Ownership
- Owner: Telemundo Station Group; (NBC Telemundo License LLC)

History
- First air date: October 29, 1987
- Former call signs: W57BA (1987–1994)
- Former channel numbers: Digital: 49 (UHF, until 2019)
- Former affiliations: Channel America (temporary, 1987–1988)
- Call sign meaning: "Radio Mundo" (former calls of former sister radio station WGES)

Technical information
- Licensing authority: FCC
- Facility ID: 74559
- Class: CD
- ERP: 15 kW
- HAAT: 382.9 m (1,256 ft)
- Transmitter coordinates: 27°50′51.5″N 82°15′49.4″W

Links
- Public license information: Public file; LMS
- Website: www.telemundo49.com

WRMD-CD (channel 49) is a low-power, Class A television station licensed to Tampa, Florida, United States, serving as the Tampa Bay Area's outlet for the Spanish-language network Telemundo. The station is owned and operated by NBCUniversal's Telemundo Station Group, and maintains studios on West Spruce Street in Tampa and a transmitter near Riverview, Florida.

== History ==
The station first signed on the air on October 29, 1987, originally broadcasting on UHF channel 57 as an affiliate of Channel America. Shortly afterward, the station was acquired by ZGS Communications, which converted the station into the Tampa Bay market's new Telemundo affiliate. WRMD originally broadcast on UHF channel 57 until the early 2000s, when the station relocated to UHF channel 49, to make room for WTTA (channel 38)'s new digital signal on channel 57. In 2004, the station began to be carried on Bright House Networks' cable systems in portions of the Tampa Bay market outside of Tampa proper.

On December 4, 2017, NBCUniversal's Telemundo Station Group announced its purchase of ZGS' 13 television stations, including WRMD-CD.

== Local programming ==
Before it launched its own newscasts, WRMD aired simulcasts of WKAQ-TV newscasts from San Juan, Puerto Rico, along with weather forecasts from Orlando sister station WTMO-CD. The station launched a weekday-only news operation on September 9, 2014, and currently runs newscasts at 6 p.m. and 11 p.m. The station also airs Florida Lottery drawings with Spanish language audio. On August 14, 2011, the station debuted its first locally produced program, a lifestyle and entertainment magazine program titled Holaciudad teve!, which airs Sundays at 6 p.m.

On June 11, 2018, six months after the purchase by NBCUniversal, the station launched two half-hour afternoon newscasts at 5 and 5:30 p.m. in addition to the 6 p.m. show.

== Subchannels ==
The station's signal is multiplexed:

Subchannels of WRMD-CD
Subchannel	Res.	Short name	Programming
49.1	1080i	WRMD-CD	Telemundo
49.2	480i	Xitos	TeleXitos
49.3	480i	CRIMES	NBC True CRMZ
49.4	480i	Oxygen	Oxygen
