= WZTD-LD =

Television station in Richmond, Virginia

- Richmond, Virginia; United States
- Channels: Digital: 34 (UHF); Virtual: 45
- Branding: Telemundo Richmond

Programming
- Affiliations: 45.1: Telemundo; 45.2: NBC True CRMZ; 45.3: Oxygen

Ownership
- Owner: Telemundo Station Group; (NBC Telemundo License LLC)

History
- Founded: December 9, 1991
- Former call signs: W61BZ (1991–2000); WKYV-LP (2000–2008); WZTD-LP (2008–2012)
- Former channel numbers: Analog: 61 (UHF, 1991–2000), 45 (UHF, 2000–2012); Digital: 45 (UHF, 2012–2019)
- Former affiliations: America's Store (2000–2006); Dark (2006–2007)
- Call sign meaning: ZGS Telemundo

Technical information
- Licensing authority: FCC
- Facility ID: 68490
- Class: LD
- ERP: 15 kW
- HAAT: 189.2 m (621 ft)
- Transmitter coordinates: 37°30′45″N 77°36′4.9″W

Links
- Public license information: LMS

WZTD-LD (channel 45) is a low-power television station in Richmond, Virginia, United States, serving as the local outlet for the Spanish-language network Telemundo. The station is owned and operated by NBCUniversal's Telemundo Station Group, and transmits from an antenna located in Bon Air, Virginia.

== History ==
The station was originally founded on December 9, 1991, as W61BZ, on channel 61, owned by TV Broadcasters of Central Virginia. On February 22, 2000, the station's call sign was changed to WKYV-LP to reflect the original location of license and then moved to channel 45. On July 21, 2000, Tiger Eye Broadcasting acquired the station and license. It became an affiliate of America's Store (a defunct shopping network owned by the Home Shopping Network) after the sale.

On August 15, 2006, the station officially signed off for technical reasons. In October 2006, ZGS Communications purchased WKYV-LP and five other stations from Tiger Eye Broadcasting for $2.15 million. In mid-November 2007, the station returned to the air as a Telemundo affiliate and changed its call sign to WZTD-LP on January 16, 2008.

During the morning of January 12, 2009, the station discontinued regular programming due to technical difficulties with its satellite system and service provider, Dish Network, caused by adverse weather conditions (showers and thunderstorms) the day before. That afternoon, the station temporarily switched to an English format from OnTV4U, a 24/7 infomercial network, and returned to Telemundo programming on January 20, 2009, sometime after 2:00 p.m.

On January 16, 2010, the station aired the inauguration of Governor Robert "Bob" McDonnell live from the State Capitol in Spanish.

On April 25, 2010, the station began airing a limited number of locally produced programs ranging from real estate, to religion, to legal advice (none produced by WZTD-LD).

On December 4, 2017, NBCUniversal's Telemundo Station Group announced its purchase of ZGS' 13 television stations, including WZTD-LD. The sale was completed on February 1, 2018.

== WZTD-LD today ==
WZTD-LD is the first Hispanic television station in Central Virginia. Unlike some Telemundo affiliates, WZTD-LD does not broadcast local news. The station does not have a website and was not listed on the ZGS corporate website for some time after its acquisition. In fact, ZGS did not formally announce the station's launch until December 2009. Aside from its Telemundo programming, the station began airing a few local shows beginning on April 25, 2010. Telemundo Richmond is available over-the-air on channel 45, Comcast Cable channels 71 & 600 and Verizon Fios channel 20. In October 2012, WZTD became available in the nearby Tri-Cities area on Comcast Cable channel 151. Until December 2009, the station had no logo, so it used the station's ID on top of the hour moving from right to left across the top of the screen. It was discontinued as of November 2008, then brought back a little over year later in January 2010.

WKYV/WZTD Station ID (November 2007-November 2008).

== Technical information ==
=== Subchannels ===
The station's digital signal is multiplexed:

Subchannels of WZTD-LD
Subchannel	Res.	Short name	Programming
45.1	1080i	WZTD-CD	Telemundo
45.2	480i	CRIMES	NBC True CRMZ (4:3)
45.3	480i	OXYGEN	Oxygen (4:3)

On September 5, 2012, WZTD-LP officially went to a low-power digital signal in HD on 45.1.
