= KGMC =

KGMC may refer to:

- KGMC (TV), a television station (channel 11, virtual 43) licensed to Merced, California, United States
- KOCB, a television station (channel 34 analog/33 digital) licensed to Oklahoma City, Oklahoma, United States, which used the call sign KGMC until September 1990
- Chhatrapati Shahuji Maharaj Medical University in Lucknow, India, formerly known as King George Medical College
