= WWSI =

Television station in Mount Laurel, New Jersey

- Mount Laurel, New Jersey; Philadelphia, Pennsylvania; United States
- City: Mount Laurel, New Jersey (Note: Originally licensed to Atlantic City, New Jersey; moved to Mount Laurel in 2018.)
- Channels: Digital: 28 (UHF), shared with WCAU; Virtual: 62
- Branding: Telemundo 62; Noticiero Telemundo 62

Programming
- Affiliations: 62.1: Telemundo; 62.2: TeleXitos

Ownership
- Owner: Telemundo Station Group; (NBC Telemundo License LLC)
- Sister stations: WCAU; NBC Sports Philadelphia

History
- First air date: January 17, 2001
- Former call signs: WDKZ (1987–1989); WACI (1989–2000); WPHA (2000–2001)
- Former channel numbers: Analog: 62 (UHF, 2001–2009); Digital: 49 (UHF, 2002–2018), 34 (UHF, 2018–2019)

Technical information
- Licensing authority: FCC
- Facility ID: 23142
- ERP: 745 kW
- HAAT: 399.8 m (1,312 ft)
- Transmitter coordinates: 40°2′30.1″N 75°14′10.1″W

Links
- Public license information: Public file; LMS
- Website: www.telemundo62.com

WWSI (channel 62) is a television station licensed to Mount Laurel, New Jersey, United States, serving as the Philadelphia-area outlet for the Spanish-language network Telemundo. It is owned and operated by NBCUniversal's Telemundo Station Group alongside NBC outlet WCAU (channel 10); it is also sister to regional sports network NBC Sports Philadelphia. The stations share studios at the Comcast Technology Center on Arch Street in Center City, and broadcast from the same transmitter in the Roxborough section of Philadelphia.

Channel 62 was assigned to Atlantic City, New Jersey, in 1984 as part of a proceeding to improve local television service throughout the state. Garden State Communications obtained the construction permit in 1987, but construction activity only progressed in 2000, after Council Tree Communications bought a majority stake. The station signed on the air in January 2001 as a Telemundo affiliate, the first in the Philadelphia market in over a year, and aired little local programming first under Council Tree and later ZGS Communications ownership. In 2013, NBC acquired WWSI, which it integrated with WCAU. This included the 2014 launch of local Spanish-language news and the 2018 move into the Comcast Technology Center. After selling the station's spectrum, WWSI began transmitting from WCAU's tower in 2018 and changed its city of license.

== History ==
=== Prehistory and construction ===
In 1980, the Federal Communications Commission (FCC) proposed assigning channel 62 to Atlantic City, New Jersey, as part of a proposal to improve television service in the state. The proceeding and channel addition were finalized in 1984, and in August 1986, the FCC designated a group of five applications for the channel for comparative hearing. A settlement agreement was registered with the FCC in 1987, though Garden State Communications was not immediately granted the permit on the issue of short-spacing with other stations. The permit remained dormant for the next decade. In 1990, the Securities and Exchange Commission sued a Philadelphia company for illegally raising funds on behalf of Garden State to build the proposed WACI-TV.

Council Tree Communications filed to acquire a majority stake in the construction permit in 1999. Council Tree was a Longmont, Colorado–based firm in which one of the investors was an Alaska Native–owned corporation. During this time, construction on the station started and faced considerable difficulty. In May 2000, work on the tower along County Route 539 in Little Egg Harbor Township briefly came to a halt as opponents objecting on radiation concerns claimed they had an injunction to stop it. Opponents also decried its proximity to homes and claimed it did not receive proper zoning approval. The dispute was in part resolved when Little Egg Harbor Township agreed to assume ownership of the tower when completed. This was key because it allowed for the exemption from planning board approval, though objectors continued to fight construction. Other objections concerned the potential danger to birds posed by the mast. During the construction process, Council Tree had become involved in Spanish-language broadcasting, principally the Telemundo network. In April 2000, it acquired KSBS-TV, the Telemundo affiliate for the Denver market, and the firm moved to acquire a stake in the network four months later.

The WWSI logo used from 2004 to 2012

After approximately six months of preparations, channel 62 signed on as Telemundo affiliate WWSI on January 17 or 26, 2001. It restored the Telemundo network to the Philadelphia market after the previous affiliate, WTVE (channel 51), disaffiliated from the network at the start of 2000. It had local offices near Penn Treaty Park in Philadelphia and in Northfield, New Jersey. Council Tree sold its ownership interest to NBC later in 2001 but did not relinquish WWSI. The station initiated digital broadcasting on channel 49 on November 1, 2002. ZGS Communications acquired WWSI for $10 million in 2008.

=== NBCU ownership ===
ZGS retained the station until agreeing to sell it to NBCUniversal for $20 million in a sale completed in July 2013. The deal created a duopoly with NBC's Philadelphia station, WCAU. Following the acquisition, NBC announced its intent to expand WCAU's news department to serve WWSI. It hired a total of 15 new employees, including bilingual reporters who filed stories for WCAU; Ramón Luis Zayas, former news anchor of Telemundo's morning program Un Nuevo Día, was named anchor of the evening newscasts. Noticiero Telemundo 62 began airing at 6 and 11 p.m. on January 13, 2014, from WCAU's studios in Bala Cynwyd, Pennsylvania.

After the news launch, WWSI has been included in several group-wide news expansions at Telemundo. In November 2014, the owned-and-operated stations launched news at 5:30 p.m., followed by 6 a.m. and noon newscasts on April 2, 2018.

NBCUniversal sold the spectrum of WWSI in the 2017 FCC spectrum reallocation incentive auction for $125.9 million. WWSI continued broadcasting on the WCAU multiplex from its existing Philadelphia tower, and its city of license was changed to Mount Laurel, New Jersey, an arrangement NBC believed would improve coverage. Prior to the auction, NBC and Telemundo were double-illuminated from each transmitter.

WCAU and WWSI moved into floors 12 through 14 of the 59-story Comcast Technology Center in Philadelphia in 2018. With the new facility, the Telemundo side of the operation had a news studio nearly the same size as WCAU for the first time.

== Technical information and subchannels ==
WCAU and WWSI transmit using WCAU's spectrum from a tower in the Roxborough section of Philadelphia. The stations' signals are multiplexed:

Subchannels of WCAU and WWSI
License	Subchannel	Res.	Short name	Programming
WCAU	10.1	1080i	WCAU-TV	NBC
WCAU	10.2	480i	COZI-TV	Cozi TV
WCAU	10.3	480i	CRIMES	NBC True CRMZ
WCAU	10.4	480i	OXYGEN	Oxygen
WWSI	62.1	1080i	WWSI-TV	Telemundo
WWSI	62.2	480i	EXITOS	TeleXitos
