= WTMO-CD =

Television station in Orlando, Florida

- Orlando, Florida; United States
- Channels: Digital: 31 (UHF); Virtual: 31
- Branding: Telemundo 31

Programming
- Affiliations: 31.1: Telemundo; for others, see § Subchannels

Ownership
- Owner: Telemundo Station Group; (NBC Telemundo License LLC)

History
- Founded: January 1993
- Former call signs: W59BH (1987–1990); W31AU (1990–1999); WPXG-LP (1999–2007); WTMO-CA (2007–2011)
- Call sign meaning: Telemundo Orlando; -or-; Telemundo

Technical information
- Licensing authority: FCC
- Facility ID: 10073
- Class: CD
- ERP: 15 kW
- HAAT: 125.4 m (411 ft)
- Transmitter coordinates: 28°36′22.6″N 81°27′23.9″W
- Translator(s): WRDQ 27.3 Orlando; WKME-CD 21 (UHF) Kissimmee; WMVJ-CD 29 (UHF) Melbourne

Links
- Public license information: Public file; LMS
- Website: www.telemundo31.com

WTMO-CD (channel 31) is a low-power, Class A television station in Orlando, Florida, United States, broadcasting the Spanish-language network Telemundo. Owned and operated by NBCUniversal's Telemundo Station Group, the station has studios at the intersection of Sand Lake Road and Orange Blossom Trail in unincorporated Orange County (using an Orlando mailing address), and its transmitter is located on Lake Sparling Road in Pine Hills. Two additional Class A stations—WKME-CD (channel 21) in Kissimmee and WMVJ-CD (channel 29) in Melbourne—rebroadcast WTMO-CD, and the Telemundo subchannel is also broadcast by full-power WRDQ in Orlando.

Telemundo first began broadcasting in Orlando on two low-power stations, W07BZ and W12CD, in 1989. The stations were owned by Timothy Brumlik, who was convicted of felony money laundering in 1990 and fought to retain the stations' licenses. In May 1995, the network moved its affiliation to W40AQ—renamed WTMO-LP—of Kissimmee, which was purchased by ZGS Communications and had a signal closer to more Central Florida Hispanics at the time. Under ZGS, in 2004, the station began producing local newscasts. It moved to the present facility in 2007 and was acquired by NBC along with ZGS's other television properties in 2018.

== History ==
The Telemundo network entered Central Florida in 1989 with the launch of low-power W07BZ, owned by Timothy Brumlik of Altamonte Springs, and W12CD, a translator on channel 12 in Altamonte Springs. This was the first Spanish-language TV service in the Orlando market. At about the time that the Telemundo stations went on the air, Brumlik—whose NewSouth Broadcasting owned or was seeking to acquire English-language independent stations in other markets—was arrested by federal authorities and charged with attempting to launder $12 million in Colombian drug money. Brumlik pleaded guilty in January 1990, The felony convictions led the Federal Communications Commission (FCC) to open hearings into whether to revoke licenses owned by Brumlik, who attempted to sell them. In the meantime, the stations were affected by two bankruptcy proceedings. Manuel Cantu, a former associate of Brumlik, acquired the W12CD license.

In May 1995, Telemundo moved its Orlando-area affiliation to W40AQ of Kissimmee, which was being purchased by ZGS Communications. This station had begun W40AQ, in addition to having ownership that already owned two Telemundo affiliates, also had a better signal from its transmitter on the Orlando World Center Marriott near the Orange–Osceola county line, where most of Central Florida's Hispanics lived at the time. It had started broadcasting in September 1993 as an independent Spanish-language station, though it also aired other programming. ZGS rebranded the station as WTMO-LP, upgrading equipment to improve the station's reliability. In 2004, WTMO launched a 6 p.m. local newscast, employing a news staff of 13. By November 2005, the station was on channel 15.

Meanwhile, in January 1993, W31AU began broadcasting on channel 31 from Orlando. Owned by Nathan Price, an Altamonte Springs pastor, it launched with home shopping but within a year switched to rebroadcasting religious station WACX (channel 55) from Leesburg in light of low revenue. The station became WPXG-LP in 1999. In 2001, then-owner Tiger Eye Broadcasting flipped WPXG-LP and WMVJ-LP in Melbourne from the ValueVision home shopping network to the newly launched America's Store.

In late 2006, ZGS acquired six low-power TV stations, including WPXG-LP and WMVJ-LP, to expand WTMO's signal reach. The WTMO call sign was moved to channel 31 on February 9, 2007.

On December 4, 2017, NBCUniversal's Telemundo Station Group announced its purchase of ZGS's 13 television stations. The sale was completed on February 1, 2018.

== Technical information ==
=== Subchannels ===
WTMO-CD is broadcast from a transmitter on Lake Sparling Road in Pine Hills. The station's signal is multiplexed:

Subchannels of WTMO-CD
Subchannel	Res.	Short name	Programming
31.1	1080i	WTMO-CD	Telemundo
31.3	480i	Xitos	TeleXitos
31.4	480i	CRIMES	NBC True CRMZ
31.5	480i	Oxygen	Oxygen

=== Translators ===
- Kissimmee: WKME-CD 21
- Melbourne: WMVJ-CD 29
