= WRDQ =

Television station in Orlando, Florida

- Orlando, Florida; United States
- Channels: Digital: 27 (UHF); Virtual: 27
- Branding: MagicTV 27; Eyewitness News

Programming
- Affiliations: 27.1: Independent; 31.2: Telemundo; for others, see § Subchannels

Ownership
- Owner: Cox Media Group; (WFTV, LLC)
- Sister stations: WFTV

History
- First air date: April 23, 2000
- Former channel numbers: Analog: 27 (UHF, 2000–2009); Digital: 14 (UHF, 2002–2009)

Technical information
- Licensing authority: FCC
- Facility ID: 55454
- ERP: 1,000 kW
- HAAT: 490 m (1,608 ft)
- Transmitter coordinates: 28°34′7″N 81°3′16″W

Links
- Public license information: Public file; LMS
- Website: www.wftv.com/tv27community

WRDQ (channel 27), branded as MagicTV 27, is an independent television station in Orlando, Florida, United States. It is owned by Cox Media Group alongside ABC affiliate WFTV (channel 9). The two stations share studios on East South Street in downtown Orlando; WRDQ's transmitter is located near Bithlo, Florida.

WRDQ began broadcasting on April 23, 2000, and has been associated with WFTV throughout its history. The original permit was held by a company headed by Marsha Reece, a former WFTV anchor and reporter, and her husband. Before it launched, Reece contracted with WFTV for programming, and soon after it launched, Cox was able to buy WRDQ outright and create a duopoly. It airs syndicated programming, morning and nighttime newscasts from WFTV, and overflow programming when necessary. One subchannel is leased to provide a high-power signal for WTMO-CD, Orlando's Telemundo station.

== History ==
In 1984, Allen Sheets petitioned the Federal Communications Commission (FCC) for the addition of channel 27 at Orlando, Florida. Owing to certain "UHF taboos" concerning interference between any two stations, a station two, three, four or five channels apart from an adjacent station (in this case, WMFE-TV on channel 24) could not place their transmitter within 20 miles (32 km) of the other due to intermodulation (spurious signals); nor could a station eight channels apart (WOFL on channel 35) within 20 miles so as to avoid an intermediate frequency beat signal. Furthermore, the new station had to space its transmitter 55 miles (89 km) away from channel 26 in Daytona Beach to avoid co-channel interference. Although such an arrangement could not happen when the final Television Table of Assignments was first adopted on April 11, 1952, the Bithlo tower farm 12 miles (19 km) east of Orlando, where WMFE-TV and WOFL were transmitting, made this arrangement possible, and on August 31, 1984, the FCC added channel 27 on the condition that the station's transmitter be sited 4.6 miles (7.4 km) south of the city coordinates.

In August 1988, an FCC administrative law judge awarded the construction permit for channel 27 in Orlando to Reece Associates Ltd., controlled by WFTV reporter Marsha Reece and her husband Rudy as well as two out-of-state investors. Reece was one of nine applicants for the channel, which Reece promised to program with a format including shows for the Black community. In 1992, the final appeals by the losing applicants were dismissed, and Reece resigned from her post at WFTV to begin the process of building channel 27. At one point, the Seminole Tribe of Florida considered investing in the permit.

Between the time Reece applied for the permit and the time construction was proposed for the tower, upscale homes were built near the tower site in Clermont, and residents were upset when the tower was proposed. In February 1994, Lake County officials denied zoning for the tower 8–0.

In 1995, Reece signed a time brokerage agreement with WFTV and agreed to co-locate the station—then designated WZWY—at WFTV's offices. However, the project remained stalled over tower siting issues. The station debuted as WRDQ on April 23, 2000, from a new 1,875-foot (572 m) tower in Kissimmee. It offered talk show repeats in prime time, classic TV series, and Tampa Bay Devil Rays baseball. Several months before WRDQ signed on, in August 1999, the FCC began allowing duopolies involving commercially licensed television stations, allowing Cox to exercise an option to acquire the station outright on February 1, 2001. Marsha Reece told the Orlando Sentinel that they never thought the FCC would allow duopoly ownership and make the option legal.

Logo used from 2018 to 2026

On May 24, 2011, Cox decided to use WRDQ to carry coverage of the Casey Anthony trial in full from 9 a.m. to 4 p.m., with WFTV airing the last hour from 4 to 5 p.m., preempting the station's weekday programming schedule. High interest in the trial eventually led to coverage being increasingly shifted to WFTV (with WRDQ generally only airing "more procedural" and "more dry or technical" portions); on June 8, coverage was moved to WFTV entirely, after ABC granted Cox permission to move ABC daytime programming to WRDQ for the remainder of the trial. It returned to WFTV upon the trial's conclusion. ABC daytime was temporarily moved to WRDQ once more during WFTV's coverage of the George Zimmerman trial in 2013.

== Local programming ==
=== Newscasts ===
In January 2002, WRDQ began airing a 10 p.m. newscast from WFTV. It added a weekday morning newscast at 7 a.m. on WRDQ in 2007 and a half-hour 6:30 p.m. newscast on that station in 2010. The latter was discontinued in 2013, though the next year the 10 p.m. news was expanded to an hour to provide stronger competition for Fox station WOFL.

=== Sports ===
WRDQ became the television broadcaster of Orlando City SC soccer in 2016, replacing WOFL and WRBW. WRDQ held the rights through 2018, though the team reached a new multi-year deal with WOFL and WRBW in 2019.

In August 2026, the Orlando Magic announced a deal with Cox Media Group to air games on WRDQ and sister station WFTV beginning in the 2026–27 season. Games of the Osceola Magic and Orlando Solar Bears were also added. Ahead of basketball season, the station rebranded as MagicTV 27.

== Technical information ==
=== Subchannels ===
WRDQ's transmitter is located near Bithlo, Florida. The station's signal is multiplexed:

Subchannels of WRDQ
Subchannel	Res.	Short name	Programming
27.1	720p	WRDQ	Independent
27.2	720p	GritTV	Grit
27.4	480i	West	WEST
31.2	480i	WTMO-SD	Telemundo (WTMO-CD)
65.2	480i	Movies.	Movies! (WRBW)

Simulcast of subchannels of another station
Broadcast on behalf of another station

In 2013, Cox began leasing a subchannel of WRDQ to rebroadcast Orlando's low-power Telemundo affiliate, WTMO-CD.

=== Analog-to-digital conversion ===
WRDQ began airing a digital signal on April 1, 2002. It ceased analog broadcasting on the original digital television transition date of February 17, 2009, and its digital signal moved from its pre-transition UHF channel 14 to channel 27 for post-transition operations.
