= WBTS-CD =

Television station in Nashua, New Hampshire

- Nashua, New Hampshire; Boston, Massachusetts; United States
- City: Nashua, New Hampshire
- Channels: Digital: 32 (UHF), shared with WGBX-TV; Virtual: 15
- Branding: NBC10 Boston

Programming
- Affiliations: 15.1: NBC; 15.2: Cozi TV

Ownership
- Owner: NBC Owned Television Stations; (NBC Telemundo License LLC)
- Sister stations: WNEU; NECN; NBC Sports Boston

History
- First air date: January 29, 1988
- Former call signs: W13BG (1985–1996); WYCN-LP (1996–2014); WYCN-CD (2014–2019)
- Former channel numbers: Analog: 13 (VHF, 1988–2014); Digital: 36 (UHF, 2014–2018), 43 (UHF, 2018–2019); Virtual: 13 (2014–2018)
- Former affiliations: Community programming (1988–2018); FamilyNet (c. 2000–2012); The Family Channel (2012–2014); TouchVision (2014–March 2015); TheCoolTV (March–December 9, 2015); Queue Network (December 9–12, 2015); Heroes & Icons (December 12, 2015–2018)

Technical information
- Licensing authority: FCC
- Facility ID: 9766
- Class: CD
- ERP: 922 kW
- HAAT: 388.3 m (1,274 ft)
- Transmitter coordinates: 42°18′37″N 71°14′12″W

Links
- Public license information: Public file; LMS
- Website: www.nbcboston.com

WBTS-CD (channel 15, cable channel 10), branded as NBC10 Boston, is a Class A television station licensed to Nashua, New Hampshire, United States. Serving as the NBC outlet for the Boston area, it is owned and operated by the network's NBC Owned Television Stations division. Under common ownership with Merrimack, New Hampshire–licensed Telemundo outlet WNEU (channel 60), regional cable news channel New England Cable News (NECN), and regional sports network NBC Sports Boston, all four outlets share studio facilities at the NBCU Boston Media Center on B Street in Needham, Massachusetts. WBTS-CD is broadcast by full-power WGBX-TV (channel 44) from its transmitter site on Cedar Street, also in Needham, giving it full coverage of the Boston television market. It is branded as channel 10 owing to its primary cable channel position.

The license started in Nashua on January 29, 1988, as W13BG "TV13 Nashua", a low-power community television station which later changed its call sign to WYCN-LP in 1996. Its programming consisted of local-service programming for the Nashua area and content already aired by local cable systems as well as, later on, FamilyNet. WYCN-LP and associated translators were sold to New Hampshire 1 Network, a company controlled by William H. Binnie, in 2010. Three years later, Binnie sold WYCN-LP to OTA Broadcasting, which removed remaining local content and converted the station to digital broadcasting.

OTA Broadcasting sold the spectrum underlying WYCN-CD in the FCC's 2017 incentive auction. Without a transmitter, the station arranged to share the transmitter of WGBX-TV, giving it full-power coverage in the Boston market. OTA Broadcasting then sold WYCN-CD to NBC, whose NBC Boston service had launched at the start of 2017 on several transmitters but lacked a single primary signal. The station changed call signs to WBTS-CD in 2019 in anticipation of the relocation of the former WBTS-LD license, now WYCN-LD, to serve the Providence, Rhode Island, area.

== TV13 Nashua ==
=== Early history ===
The station came to the air at 8 p.m. on January 29, 1988, as W13BG on VHF channel 13 in Nashua, New Hampshire; its license was granted on July 29. Founded by Robert Rines and owned by Center Broadcasting Corporation of New Hampshire, a non-profit partnership between the Concord–based Franklin Pierce Law Center and the Boston–based Academy of Law Sciences, the station aired local community programming for the Nashua area, along with programming that was already being sold to cable stations though the Yankee Communications Network. Channel 13 changed its call sign to WYCN-LP on April 8, 1996. Its tower in the analog era of television was on the campus of Rivier University, between two above-ground reservoirs and Brassard Hall, with studios in Memorial Hall on the same campus.

WYCN-LP was nearly dropped by Harron Cable on its Nashua-area systems in October 1999 to accommodate a must-carry request by WMFP (channel 62), a move that could have led to the closure of channel 13 even though its carriage on MediaOne in Nashua itself was not affected. Its carriage was ultimately continued by Adelphia Communications following its purchase of Harron, though the station was dropped for a time in 2000 after an additional must-carry request, from WYDN (channel 48), while Adelphia rebuilt the systems. By August 11, 2000, WYCN-LP had been authorized to carry programming from FamilyNet.

WYCN-LP, along with three co-owned translators in Nashua, Manchester, and Concord, was sold by Center Broadcasting Corporation of New Hampshire to New Hampshire 1 Network, a company controlled by William H. Binnie, in 2010; by this point, control of the stations had passed to longtime WYCN staffers Gordon Jackson and Carolyn Choate following the death of Robert Rines. The deal was completed January 3, 2012; in the meantime, Binnie would also acquire WBIN-TV (channel 50, now WWJE-DT) in Derry. As a result of the sale, much of WYCN's community programming, including aldermatic debates, was discontinued. In December 2012, the station's studios moved from Rivier University to a location shared with sister station WFNQ (106.3 FM).

=== OTA Broadcasting ownership and conversion to digital ===
New Hampshire 1 Network filed to sell WYCN-LP to OTA Broadcasting, a company controlled by Michael Dell's MSD Capital, on January 14, 2013; the three translators were not included in the deal, and began to simulcast WBIN-TV. Operation of WYCN continued to be handled by New Hampshire 1. At the time of the sale, WYCN was affiliated with My Family TV. The Federal Communications Commission (FCC) approved the sale on March 22, and it was completed on May 20.

WYCN-LP resumed producing local programming soon after the sale to OTA Broadcasting, rehiring Gordon Jackson and Carolyn Choate as station managers; however, in June 2013, Comcast (successor to both Harron/Adelphia and MediaOne) informed the station that it would be dropped from its lineup as of August 15 due to the earlier cessation of local programming, as well as its limited broadcast reach and continued analog broadcasting, even though WYCN had a construction permit to convert to digital operations and increase its broadcast range. Comcast subsequently pushed back the date of the removal to September 3, despite protests from viewers, politicians, and Nashua's public access station.

Due to its low power, WYCN's analog signal reached only portions of Nashua, its city of license. In contrast, its digital signal was expected to reach Manchester and Boston. The digital facility was planned to sign on by December 2013; construction was held up by the need to use a helicopter to remove a former antenna for WNDS (now WWJE-DT) from the tower on Merrill Hill in Hudson that WYCN planned to use, an operation that was delayed to May 2014 by winter weather. The conversion to digital was licensed by the FCC on October 23, 2014; concurrent with the launch of the digital signal, the analog channel 13 signal was shut down.

Until January 2018, WYCN-CD's original digital transmitter was 625 feet (0.191 km) off Trigate Road in rural Hudson, southeast of Nashua. The station's pre-auction digital signal broadcast on UHF channel 36, using virtual channel 13.

== NBC10 Boston ==
WYCN-CD sold its frequency rights as part of the FCC's spectrum auction for $80.4 million. OTA Broadcasting entered into a channel sharing agreement with WGBX-TV (channel 44) for the station; NBC agreed to purchase the channel share agreement and the WYCN-CD license in October 2017. In December 2017, the station announced on its website that it would "cease broadcasting on its current frequency on January 16, 2018 and begin broadcasting NBC Boston on a new frequency". As WYCN's signal overlaps with WGME-TV in Portland, Maine, which also uses virtual channel 13, WYCN began using virtual channel 15 following the commencement of channel sharing, as WGME's post-auction physical channel is 15 (WGME's pre-auction channel, 38, was not available to WYCN as virtual channel 38 is assigned to WSBK-TV).

The sale to NBC was completed on January 18, 2018; the station began channel sharing with WGBX the same day. Before this transition, WYCN-CD was affiliated with Heroes & Icons (H&I), which also maintained a full-market affiliation on the second subchannel of WSBK-TV.

On August 8, 2019, WBTS-LD (channel 8) and WYCN-CD swapped call signs, with channel 8 becoming WYCN-LD and channel 15 changing to WBTS-CD. On August 31, 2019, WYCN-LD left the air in advance of its October 2019 transmitter move to Norton, Massachusetts, and city of license change to Providence, Rhode Island; WYCN-LD now serves as a Telemundo station for Providence, leaving WBTS-CD as the sole NBC station for the Boston area.

== News operation ==
As a programming strategy, that just mystifies me. If you have four McDonald's on the block, why would you want to build another one?

— Alan Schroeder, professor of journalism, Northeastern University, on the format of NBC10 Boston's news

Concurrent with the launch, NBC Boston debuted a full suite of local newscasts. Early reviews found the news effort to be competitive with Boston's established local TV newsrooms but noted that the style was more in line with traditional major-market network affiliates than the flashy approach characteristic of WHDH. Shirley Leung, writing in The Boston Globe, concluded that NBC Boston "isn't an innovator", citing former Boston news directors and journalism professors. Former WBZ-TV news director Matt Ellis described NBC Boston's news as "much more on your side than in your face". The staff consisted of a blend of new hires, younger than anchors at other stations, and existing NECN talent, as well as Pete Bouchard and Phil Lipof, previously of WCVB. To the existing resources of NECN and WNEU, NBC added approximately 80 employees, new vehicles for weather coverage, and a leased helicopter. A second former WCVB anchor, J. C. Monahan, left that station to join NBC Boston in July 2017.

A year after the switch and launch, NBC10 Boston and WHDH were trending in opposite directions in the ratings. WHDH had largely maintained its news audience, including first- and second-place finishes in the morning and at 5 and 6 p.m. Meanwhile, NBC10 frequently ranked as the weakest out of Boston's five news-producing stations, though marquee fall network programming provided an improvement in the second half of 2017. One reason for the poor performance was loyalty to existing stations in the Boston market.

== Technical information and subchannels ==
WGBX-TV and WBTS-CD transmit using WGBX-TV's spectrum from a tower on Cedar Street in Needham, Massachusetts. The stations' signals are multiplexed:

Subchannels of WGBX-TV and WBTS-CD
License	Subchannel	Res.	Short name	Programming
WGBX-TV	2.2	480i	World	World
WGBX-TV	2.3	480i	WGBH-SD	PBS (WGBH-TV)
WGBX-TV	44.2	480i	WGBX-SD	PBS
WGBX-TV	44.3	480i	Create	Create
WGBX-TV	44.4	480i	Kids	PBS Kids
WBTS-CD	15.1	1080i	WBTS-CD	NBC
WBTS-CD	15.2	480i	Cozi	Cozi TV

Simulcast of subchannels of another station

The NBC subchannel is offered in ATSC 3.0 (NextGen TV) format from the transmitter of WUNI.

== See also ==
- Media in Boston
- Channel 15 virtual TV stations in the United States
- Channel 10 branded TV stations in the United States
- Channel 32 digital TV stations in the United States
- Channel 32 low-power TV stations in the United States
