= Spectrum News NECN =

American regional cable news television network

- Country: United States
- Broadcast area: Massachusetts; Connecticut; Vermont; Maine; New Hampshire; Rhode Island
- Network: Spectrum News
- Headquarters: Needham, Massachusetts

Programming
- Language: English
- Picture format: 480i (SDTV); 1080i (HDTV)

Ownership
- Owner: Charter Communications
- Sister channels: Spectrum News 1 (Massachusetts) • Spectrum News Maine

History
- Launched: March 2, 1992

Links
- Website: Spectrum News NECN

Availability

Streaming media
- FuboTV: Internet Protocol television
- YouTube TV (Select areas): Internet Protocol television

Spectrum News NECN (also known as just NECN, and formerly New England Cable News) is a regional 24-hour cable news television network owned and operated by Spectrum News, which itself is owned by Charter Communications. It serves the New England region of the United States. It focuses on regional news, with local headlines approximately every 15 minutes and weather forecasts approximately every 10 minutes.

Spectrum News NECN, along with NBC owned and operated NBC10 Boston (WBTS-CD channel 15), Telemundo O&O WNEU (channel 60), and NBC Sports Boston, are based at the NBCU Boston Media Center on B Street in Needham, Massachusetts. NECN also operated several news bureaus in the New England area, including Manchester, New Hampshire; Hartford, Connecticut; Worcester, Massachusetts; Portland, Maine; Providence, Rhode Island; and Burlington, Vermont.

New England Cable News maintains a remote camera in the television studio of Suffolk University in downtown Boston. New England Cable News is available across New England in 3.7 million homes and produces several original programs.

== History ==
NECN was launched March 2, 1992, as a joint partnership between Continental Cablevision (now part of Comcast) and the Hearst Corporation. On June 18, 2009, Hearst sold its stake in NECN to Comcast, which began to operate it as a division of the Comcast Sports Group and Comcast SportsNet.

When Hearst owned a stake in NECN, it used the resources of several New England stations owned and operated by Hearst Television to assist in news coverage of the region. The Hearst stations include Boston ABC affiliate WCVB-TV (early in NECN's existence, the network rebroadcast WCVB's 6:00 p.m. newscast at 8:00 p.m., an arrangement discontinued in 1998); New Hampshire's ABC affiliate WMUR-TV; ABC affiliate WMTW in Portland (NECN and WMTW both maintained bureaus in the Time and Temperature Building in downtown Portland, though the operations were physically separate and NECN used its own news vehicles in Maine); and WPTZ and WNNE, Vermont's two NBC affiliates. Other partnerships NECN maintained in its early years included WGGB-TV in Springfield, Massachusetts, WGME-TV in Portland (prior to Hearst's 2004 purchase of WMTW), WTNH in New Haven, Connecticut, WPRI-TV in Providence, Rhode Island, and The Boston Globe. During the mid-2000s, NECN's website was housed on the Globe-affiliated boston.com; a separate website was restarted on January 1, 2008.

Before its merger into the NBC Owned Television Stations, NECN was a training ground for local news reporters. Some of the better-known reporters who got their start at NECN include ABC's Dan Harris, CNN's Suzanne Malveaux, and CNBC's Maya Kulycky. Several of Boston's current television reporters and anchors also began at NECN. Conversely, NECN has also employed some of the long-lived veterans of the Boston television market, including R. D. Sahl, Tom Ellis and Chet Curtis.

In addition to its cable production operations, NECN began to produce a 10:00 p.m. newscast for Boston Fox affiliate WFXT, known as Fox 25 News at 10:00 on September 7, 1993. Shortly after Fox Television Stations bought WFXT from the Boston Celtics, it chose not to renew the contract with NECN upon its expiration on October 1, 1995 (the station would launch its own news operation a year later); the next day, the newscast moved to UPN affiliate WSBK-TV and was renamed UPN 38 Prime News. The 10:00 p.m. newscast left the air on October 4, 1998, when WSBK canceled it to focus on sports and entertainment programming; WSBK's Boston Bruins telecasts continued to include NECN-produced news inserts during the 1998–99 season. During the 2000s, NECN partnered with Charter Communications to produce Worcester News Tonight for its Charter TV3 channel.

Comcast systems carry NECN as part of its limited basic tier, usually on a low and prime channel position (channel 6 in most Metro Boston communities). It is also seen on Verizon FiOS on channel 13 as part of local Digital, and on RCN on channel 318 as part of its Signature package. Most other cable TV systems in New England carry NECN, with the exception of Cox. The service is not available on satellite.

On January 18, 2010, NECN began broadcasting in high definition. Most Boston-area Comcast subscribers can watch NECN-HD on Channel 840. Verizon carries NECN-HD on channel 513, also as part of local digital, while RCN subscribers can watch NECN-HD on channel 618.

In July 2013, as part of a corporate reorganization resulting from Comcast's purchase of NBCUniversal, NECN was moved into the NBC Owned Television Stations division—aligning it with NBC and Telemundo's owned-and-operated stations, although Boston's NBC affiliate WHDH was not owned by the network. On January 1, 2017, low-power station WBTS-LD became Boston's new NBC O&O, replacing WHDH as its affiliate; NBC Boston shares studios and resources with NECN. WNEU, the Telemundo O&O for Boston, has also shared resources with NECN since launching a news operation in 2015. Under NBCUniversal management, NECN also began sharing resources with the other NBC affiliates in New England: WVIT in New Britain, Connecticut (an O&O), WWLP in Springfield, Massachusetts, WJAR in Providence, Rhode Island, and WCSH in Portland, Maine (and its Bangor semi-satellite, WLBZ), along with maintaining its existing relationship with WPTZ.

In December 2013, Time Warner Cable announced that NECN would be dropped from its lineups in Maine, New Hampshire, and Massachusetts by the end of the year. The future of the Portland, Maine bureau was called into question. The decision was widely criticized by Time Warner Cable customers, who solicited the intervention of public officials on their behalf. TWC subsequently decided to continue carrying NECN.

In 2016, NECN became one of the first regional cable networks to be available on the now defunct PlayStation Vue (and the first to be on an over-the-top Internet television service). Due to how PlayStation Vue defined each region it served, it also extended the network's reach into the New York Tri-State area. It was later added to more streaming television services such as FuboTV, YouTube TV, Hulu with Live TV, and Sling TV.

In December 2016, Charter Spectrum dropped NECN from its basic tier, although it remains available on its digital tiers.

In late December 2022, as part of cost-cutting measures, NBCUniversal announced the closure of the NECN Vermont bureau at the end of the year.

From 2023 to 2026, NECN has aired select games involving the WNBA's Connecticut Sun. Most Sun games aired on former sister station NBC Sports Boston. The Sun have since relocated to Houston, Texas as the Houston Comets.

On January 13, 2025, NECN announced that its separate website and apps would be closed on February 13 of that year, with its content being moved into the NBC10 Boston website and apps.

On July 1, 2025, NECN parent Comcast dropped the network from its cable systems (including Xfinity), citing declining viewership and duplicative programming. It was re-added to Xfinity systems across New England when it became part of Spectrum News in September 2026.

=== Spectrum News NECN ===
On February 11, 2026, Charter Communications announced that it would acquire NECN's assets from NBCUniversal; its operations would be merged with Charter's existing Spectrum News channels in the immediate region (including Spectrum News 1 in Worcester and Spectrum News Maine) under the new name Spectrum News NECN, and they will continue to operate from NBC Boston's studios in Needham.

Spectrum News NECN formally launched on September 23, 2026, when Spectrum News took over the station's operations. Former WCVB-TV anchor Matt Reed currently serves as the network's primary anchor. Spectrum News also announced plans for a new New England-focused morning program, anchored by Reed, later in 2026. Senior News Director Teisha Parker leads the network's newsroom.

=== Notable former on-air staff ===
- Liz Cho - anchor at WABC-TV New York
- Chet Curtis - long-time Boston news anchor at WCVB
- Tom Ellis – (1992–2008) news anchor; died in 2019
- Dan Harris - ABC News anchor
- Suzanne Malveaux - former CNN anchor and correspondent
- Aneesh Raman - former CNN correspondent and speechwriter for President Obama
- J. C. Monahan - anchor at WBTS-CD Boston

== See also ==
- List of wired multiple-system broadband providers in Massachusetts (by municipality)
