= KNSO =

Television station in Clovis, California

- Clovis–Fresno, California; United States
- City: Clovis, California
- Channels: Digital: 27 (UHF); Virtual: 51
- Branding: Telemundo Fresno

Programming
- Affiliations: 51.1: Telemundo; for others, see § Subchannels

Ownership
- Owner: Telemundo Station Group; (NBC Telemundo License LLC)

History
- Founded: October 2, 1989
- First air date: September 11, 1992
- Former call signs: KSDI (September–December 1992); KGMC (1992–2020)
- Former channel numbers: Analog: 43 (UHF, 1992–2009); Digital: 44 (UHF, until 2009), 43 (UHF, 2009–2018); Virtual: 43 (until 2020)
- Former affiliations: The Box (1992–1995); The WB (1995–1997); Infomercials/Religious (1997−1998); America's Store (1998–2007); Jewelry Television (2007–2012); MundoFox/MundoMax (2012–2016); Estrella TV (2016–2020); Ion Television (DT3, 2020–2021)
- Call sign meaning: Transposition of last three letters in "Fresno"

Technical information
- Licensing authority: FCC
- Facility ID: 23302
- ERP: 385 kW
- HAAT: 578 m (1,896 ft)
- Transmitter coordinates: 37°4′19.1″N 119°25′52.5″W

Links
- Public license information: Public file; LMS
- Website: www.telemundofresno.com

KNSO (channel 51) is a television station licensed to Clovis, California, United States, broadcasting the Spanish-language Telemundo network to the Fresno area. Owned and operated by NBCUniversal's Telemundo Station Group, the station maintains studios on North Grove Industrial Drive on the east side of Fresno, south near the Fresno Yosemite International Airport, and its transmitter is located on Bald Mountain, south of Meadow Lakes in Fresno County.

== History ==
=== Early years ===
The UHF channel 43 allocation in the Fresno market was originally licensed to KICU-TV. Operating as an independent station, the station signed on the air on December 23, 1961, five days after Fresno's first independent station, KAIL (channel 53, now a TCT O&O on channel 7) took to the air. KICU carried a mix of movies and other independent fare. Toward the end of its run, KICU also picked up some NBC programs that were not cleared to air by that network's Fresno affiliate, KMJ-TV (channel 24, now KSEE-TV). The station ceased operations in 1968; the KICU-TV call letters are now used by a MyNetworkTV station in San Jose.

=== 1990s–present ===
Channel 43 returned to the air on September 11, 1992, as KSDI; the station was originally an affiliate of the viewer-request music video network The Box. That December, the station changed its call letters to KGMC (the calls were previously used by KOCB in Oklahoma City from 1979 to 1989).

In January 1995, the station entered into a local marketing agreement with Pappas Telecasting Companies, owner of Fox affiliate KMPH-TV (channel 26). Pappas programmed the station from 7 to 9 a.m. and again from 3 to 11 p.m. daily, airing a blend of cartoons, classic sitcoms and older movies. On January 11 of that year, the station became a charter affiliate of The WB. KGMC continued to run religious programs, paid programming, and home shopping programs during time periods that were not programmed by Pappas.

In 1997, KGMC terminated the LMA with Pappas, switching full-time to a format of infomercials and religious programs. Pappas then moved the WB affiliation first to KMPH on a secondary basis, and later to KNSO (channel 51) in 1998 and finally to KFRE-TV (channel 59) in 2001, where the network remained until The WB ceased operations in September 2006 and was replaced by The CW. In the meantime, KGMC would join home shopping channel America's Store in 1998; after America's Store was shut down by HSN in 2007, KGMC switched its programming to Jewelry Television. KGMC had been the only full-power independent television station in the Fresno market, until August 1, 2012, when it became an affiliate of the Spanish-language network MundoFox. On December 1, 2016, with the demise of MundoMax, KGMC switched to Liberman Broadcasting's Estrella TV network.

On February 27, 2020, NBCUniversal agreed to transfer the license assets of KNSO to Cocola Broadcasting in exchange for acquiring the KGMC license. The sale was completed on September 1, 2020. Upon completion of transfer in which the call signs were also swapped, KNSO now operates on UHF channel 27, while KGMC operates on VHF channel 11.

== News operation ==
On September 1, 2015, KNSO (then licensed to Merced) launched its first local news production and the second local Spanish-language newscast in the market, Noticiero Telemundo Valle Central. It is an hour-long weekday newscast produced from the studio of Nexstar Broadcasting Group-owned KSEE and KGPE; Serestar elected to partner with the two stations so that the production could leverage the resources of the stations' new facilities. The newscast is anchored and executive produced by Vanessa Ramirez-Avila, formerly of KFTV-DT, and features reporting from KGPE, KSEE, and its Bakersfield sister stations KGET and KKEY-LD.

In 2017, an 11 p.m. weeknight newscast (co-produced and simulcast on sister station KCSO-LD in Sacramento) was added. Branded as Noticiero Telemundo California, the newscast features some Fresno-area news via a pre-recorded package from the KSEE/KGPE studio.

== Technical information ==
=== Subchannels ===
The station's signal is multiplexed:

Subchannels of KNSO
Subchannel	Res.	Short name	Programming
51.1	1080i	KNSO-DT	Telemundo
51.2	480i	Exitos	TeleXitos
51.3	480i	COZI TV	Cozi TV
51.4	480i	CRIMES	NBC True CRMZ
51.5	480i	Oxygen	Oxygen
59.4	480i	Charge!	Charge! (KFRE-TV)

Simulcast of subchannels of another station

=== Analog-to-digital conversion ===
KNSO (as KGMC) ended regular programming on its analog signal, over UHF channel 43, on June 12, 2009, the official date on which full-power television stations in the United States transitioned from analog to digital broadcasts under federal mandate. The station's digital signal was relocated from its pre-transition UHF channel 44 to channel 43.

As part of the SAFER Act, KGMC kept its analog signal on the air until June 26 to inform viewers of the digital television transition through a loop of public service announcements from the National Association of Broadcasters.

=== Spectrum auction repack ===
KNSO (as KGMC) was one of nearly 1,000 television stations that were required to change their digital channel allocation in the upcoming spectrum auction repack in early 2018. The station reallocated its digital signal to UHF channel 27 in phase one of the auction.
