= America's Store =

American shopping television network

- Type: cable, shopping television network, satellite television network, broadcast television network
- Country: United States

Ownership
- Owner: IAC/InterActiveCorp

History
- Launched: 1988; 38 years ago
- Closed: April 7, 2007; 19 years ago
- Former names: Home Shopping Club Overnight Service (1988–89); Home Shopping SPREE (1989–97); America's Jewelry Store (1997–98)

America's Store was a US shopping television network. It was the spin-off channel to the Home Shopping Network (HSN).

America's Store (AS) began in 1988 as the Home Shopping Club Overnight Service, which aired on broadcast stations around the US from midnight to 9 am and, in particular, on WWOR-TV from 3 am to 6 am in the New York City metro area. In 1989, HSN purchased a number of low-power TV stations and began operating the service 24 hours a day as Home Shopping SPREE. In 1997, the name was changed again to America's Jewelry Store to reflect a switch to exclusively selling jewelry. This incarnation met with limited success, so in 1998, the selection was expanded to include all of HSN's inventory categories, and the word jewelry was removed from the network's name. In 2003, AS was added to the DirecTV lineup.

The low-power TV stations owned by HSN with partners and affiliated companies were located in every major metropolitan market – including a transmitter atop the World Trade Center until the September 11 attacks on September 11, 2001.

Much of the merchandise presented by AS was distressed inventory from HSN, so the prices were usually dropped until liquidated or removed from air. On April 3, 2007, America's Store ceased broadcasting permanently, as part of new CEO Mindy Grossman's attempt to keep HSN relevant and profitable, which included the closure or sale of non-core operations.

Competitor QVC had a spin-off channel called "Q2", which lasted only two years, from 1994 to 1996. Following Barry Diller's exit from QVC and purchase of HSN, many former Q2 employees followed him to HSN and America's Store.

== Hosts ==
Home shopping hosts that appeared on America's Store at the time of its closure, some of whom were HSN hosts at that time, included (in alphabetical order):

- Liz Benbrook
- Tina Berry
- Alyce Caron (later only at HSN, retired in December 2023)
- Tracey Edwards
- Bill Green (now only at HSN)
- Rich Hollenberg
- Brian Hyder
- Lori Leland (now only at HSN as a guest product expert)
- Diana Perkovic (later only at HSN, where she left on December 13, 2013)
- Alan Skantz (later only at HSN, where he left in 2011)
- Perry Slater
- Marlo Smith (now only at HSN)
