= NBC LX Home =

American television channel

NBC True CRMZ
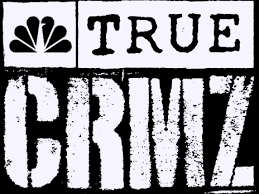

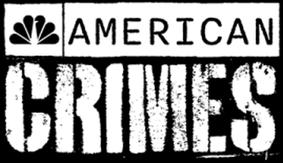
- Country: United States

Programming
- Language: English

Ownership
- Owner: NBCUniversal Owned Television Stations
- Parent: Comcast

History
- Launched: May 2020; 6 years ago (as LX)
- Closed: July 16, 2024; 2 years ago (as NBC LX Home, OTA only)
- Former names: LX (2020–2022); LX News (2022–2023); NBC LX Home (2023–2024) (OTA only); NBC American Crimes (2024–2025) (OTA only)

Links
- Website: www.nbctruecrmz.com

Availability

Terrestrial
- Available in many markets via digital subchannels, mainly on NBC or Telemundo-owned stations

Streaming media
- Services: FuboTV, Peacock, Roku Channel, Samsung TV Plus, Xumo, Pluto TV, Hulu, YouTube TV
- Closed (as NBC LX Home)
- Rebranded to NBC True CRMZ

NBC True CRMZ is an American digital subchannel network, airing true crime documentary programming.

The channel, originally known as LX, later LX News and NBC LX Home, is a brand for original home and lifestyle content, originally for the NBCUniversal-owned television stations. LX is short for Local X, with the "X" standing for "exponential". NBC LX Home is a part of the station group's multicast division LXTV, led by senior vice president Meredith McGinn, content strategy vice president Matt Goldberg and managing editor Meagan Harris.

In July 2024, NBC LX Home on over-the-air television stations was rebranded as NBC American Crimes, a format airing true crime programming. A new iteration of NBC LX Home launched on free ad-supported streaming television (FAST) shortly afterwards. In September 2025, the channel rebranded to its current moniker, retaining the American Crimes branding on its FAST channel counterpart.

NBC American Crimes is available on over-the-top for Peacock, FuboTV, Xumo, Samsung TV Plus, and to viewers of The Roku Channel, social media and via its website. NBC True CRMZ is available on terrestrial television and Xfinity cable in select television markets.

== History ==
The channel's predecessor, NBCUniversal's previous news and lifestyle multicast network NBC Nonstop (now known as Cozi TV), was launched in 2009 on its owned and operated station group, mostly on NBC O&O affiliates that previously carried NBC Weather Plus. Its programming included core shows from LXTV.

LX content featured longform content, a switch from prior NBCUniversal efforts at NBC News Now with Briefly and Snapchat news show Stay Tuned, created to reach Generation Z and millennials. With the broadcast network and streaming television channel, there were two live programming blocks (7-10 AM and PM) of three hour daily newscasts produced at KXAS. LX programming originally came from station groups and the owned and separately operated LXTV Productions, with licensed additional content to fill out the day. The additional content came from Jukin Media, Tastemade and The Dodo. The main newscast when launched was two hours long.

NBCU stations' desire to reach younger audiences led to the creation of the LX content brand. On September 23, 2019, the station group launched its LX news digitally initially on YouTube, its website and social media. LX was launched as a live-streaming channel and multicast over-the-air network in May 2020.

In August 2023, LX was rebranded from LX News to NBC LX Home as it transitioned from a news format to a home and lifestyle format.

In July 2024, NBC LX Home was rebranded as NBC American Crimes, and a new iteration of NBC LX Home launched on free ad-supported streaming television afterwards.

== Programming ==
=== LX News ===
Programming of LX News included:

- Current - Events, pop culture trends and entertainment news.
- LX News - a storytelling approach to news that is personal, inspiring, thought-provoking, and community focused.
- LX News Zone - a daily digest of the news from NBC local stations.
- LX Explains - a deep dive into the issues and events impacting communities and the world; focusing on the environment, politics, technology, community, social justice, and current events, with an innovative storytelling approach to news.
- LX Presents - Daily and weekly specials that feature LX documentary stories, explainers and robust storytelling from NBC owned television stations and NBC News digital.

=== NBC LX Home ===
- George to the Rescue - Announced on the LX website on August 7, 2023, the series is hosted by George Oliphant and "transforms homes to change lives for families and communities facing unique challenges." George to the Rescue is produced by LXTV.

== Rebrand as NBC LX Home ==
Logo used for NBC LX Home

On May 3, 2023, it was reported that NBCUniversal would be closing LX after firing several employees within the company. LX planned to shut down in mid-2023, with around 40 affected staffers being considered for other positions within NBCUniversal.

On June 30, 2023, LX News ended and its YouTube channel posted a farewell video.

In August 2023, the LX website and broadcast channel were rebranded from LX News to NBC LX Home. All original LX News programming removed from the schedule. Its Facebook page was also rebranded.

The LX News YouTube channel remained online after LX News's closure in August 2023, featuring an archive of the channel's content.

== Rebrand as NBC American Crimes/NBC True CRMZ ==
NBC American Crimes/NBC True CRMZ
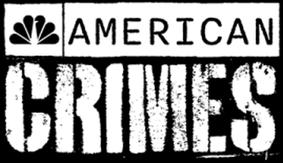

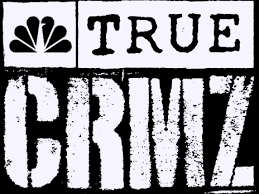
- Country: United States

Programming
- Language: English

Ownership
- Owner: NBCUniversal Owned Television Stations
- Parent: Comcast

History
- Launched: July 17, 2024 (as an OTA channel)
- Former names: LX (2020–2022); LX News (2022–2023); NBC LX Home (2023–2024); NBC American Crimes (2024–2025, OTA only)

Links
- Website: www.nbctruecrmz.com

Availability

Terrestrial
- See list of affiliates

Streaming media
- Services: Local Now, Pluto TV, Roku Channel, Samsung TV Plus, Xumo, Hulu, YouTube TV

On July 17, 2024, NBC LX Home on over-the-air television stations rebranded as NBC American Crimes, shifting its focus to true crime programming. A new iteration of NBC LX Home launched on free ad-supported streaming television shortly thereafter.

On September 29, 2025, NBC American Crimes on over-the-air television stations quietly rebranded to NBC True CRMZ. Its FAST channel counterpart retained the American Crimes branding.

== Affiliates ==
List of affiliates for NBC True CRMZ
Media market	State/Dist./Terr.	Station	Channel	Notes
Birmingham	Alabama	WUOA-LD	46.7	
Mobile	Alabama	WWBH-LD	28.5	
Montgomery	Alabama	WQAP-LD	36.2	
Phoenix	Arizona	KTAZ	39.4	
Tucson	Arizona	KHRR	40.3	
Hot Springs	Arkansas	KWMO-LD	34.5	
Bakersfield	California	KTLD-CD	8.3	
Fresno	California	KNSO	51.4	
Los Angeles	California	KNBC	4.3	
Sacramento	California	KCSO-LD	33.5	
Sacramento	California	KMUM-CD	33.5	(Note: Translator of KCSO-LD.)
Salinas–Monterey	California	K15CU-D	15.3	
San Diego	California	KNSD	39.3	
San Francisco	California	KNTV	11.5	
San Francisco	California	KSTS	48.5	
Denver	Colorado	KDEN-TV	25.4	
Hartford–New Haven	Connecticut	WVIT	30.3	
Washington	District of Columbia	WRC-TV	4.3	
Jacksonville	Florida	WODH-LD	34.4	
Miami–Fort Lauderdale	Florida	WTVJ	6.3	
Naples–Fort Myers	Florida	WWDT-CD	43.4	
Orlando	Florida	WKME-CD	31.4	(Note: Translator of WTMO-CD.)
Orlando	Florida	WKMG-TV	6.2	
Tampa	Florida	WRMD-CD	49.3	
Macon	Georgia	W28EU-D	42.1	
Savannah	Georgia	WDID-LD	26.6	
Boise	Idaho	KFLL-LD	25.2	
Cedar Rapids	Iowa	KFKZ-LD	35.2	
Des Moines	Iowa	KAJR-LD	36.6	
Chicago	Illinois	WMAQ-TV	5.3	
Salem	Illinois	W29CI-D	29.2	
Springfield	Illinois	WCQA-LD	16.7	
Fort Wayne	Indiana	WCUH-LD	16.4	
Fort Wayne	Indiana	WLMO-LD	2.1/3	
Indianapolis	Indiana	WUDZ-LD	28.5	
Wichita	Kansas	KFVT-LD	34.5	
New Orleans	Louisiana	WTNO-CD	22.5	
New Orleans	Louisiana	WQDT-LD	33.5	
Baltimore	Maryland	WQAW-LD	69.6	
Boston	Massachusetts	WNEU	15.3	
Detroit	Michigan	WDWO-CD	18.2	
Midland	Michigan	W35DQ-D	24.5	
Traverse City	Michigan	W36FH-D	36.2	
Minneapolis–Saint Paul	Minnesota	KJNK-LD	25.4	
Mankato	Minnesota	K28OH-D	25.4	(Note: Translator of KJNK-LD.)
Joplin	Missouri	KRLJ-LD	45.5	
Kansas City	Missouri	KAJF-LD	21.5	
Springfield	Missouri	KCNH-LD	47.2	
St. Louis	Missouri	K25NG-D	25.5	
Lincoln	Nebraska	KAJS-LD	33.4	
Lincoln	Nebraska	KIUA-LD	15.3	
Las Vegas	Nevada	KBLR	39.3	
Reno	Nevada	K07AAI-D	12.1	
Albuquerque	New Mexico	KUPT-LD	2.3	
New York City	New York	WNBC	4.3	
Rochester	New York	WGCE-CD	6.6	
Charlotte	North Carolina	W15EB-D	21.3	
Charlotte	North Carolina	WHEH-LD	41.2	
Wilmington	North Carolina	WQDH-LD	49.4	
Fargo	North Dakota	K15MR-D	51.1	
Cleveland	Ohio	WUEK-LD	26.7	
Columbus	Ohio	WDEM-CD	17.3	
Oklahoma City	Oklahoma	KTOU-LD	22.4	
Tulsa	Oklahoma	KZLL-LD	39.5	
Portland	Oregon	KOXI-CD	20.6	
Philadelphia	Pennsylvania	WCAU	10.3	
Pittsburgh	Pennsylvania	WJMB-CD	60.1	
Pittsburgh	Pennsylvania	WMVH-CD	26.2	(Note: Translator of WWLM-CD.)
Pittsburgh	Pennsylvania	WWLM-CD	20.2	
Uniontown	Pennsylvania	WWKH-CD	35.2	
San Juan	Puerto Rico	WKAQ-TV	2.4	
Providence	Rhode Island	WYCN-LD	8.4	
Charleston	South Carolina	WBSE-LD	20.5	
Columbia	South Carolina	WKTC	63.2	
Florence	South Carolina	W33DN-D	16.2	
Jackson	Tennessee	WYJJ-LD	27.6	
Memphis	Tennessee	KPMF-LD	26.1	
Nashville	Tennessee	WCTZ-LD	35.7	
Amarillo	Texas	KLKW-LD	22.5	
Austin	Texas	KVAT-LD	17.9	
Corpus Christi	Texas	K21OC-D	54.4	
Corpus Christi	Texas	K32OC-D	29.6	
Dallas–Fort Worth	Texas	KXAS-TV	5.3	
El Paso	Texas	KTDO	48.3	
Houston	Texas	KTMD	47.3	
Lubbock	Texas	KNKC-LD	29.5	
Mullin	Texas	KAXW-LD	35.3	
Harlingen–McAllen	Texas	KTLM	40.4	
San Antonio	Texas	KVDA	60.4	
Tyler	Texas	KPKN-LD	33.6	
Ogden	Utah	KULX-CD	10.4	(Note: Translator of KTMW.)
Salt Lake City	Utah	KTMW	20.4	
Salt Lake City	Utah	KEJT-CD	50.4	
Richmond	Virginia	WZTD-LD	45.2	
Pasco	Washington	K28QK-D	22.1	
Seattle	Washington	KUSE-LD	46.6	
Charleston	West Virginia	WOCW-LD	21.6	
Madison	Wisconsin	W23BW-D	23.6	
Milwaukee	Wisconsin	WTSJ-LD	38.5	

== See also ==
- Current TV
- Free Speech TV (satellite, cable, OTT)
- Vice (cable and OTT)
