= Frequency sharing =

Use of the same radio frequency by two or more broadcast licensees

In telecommunications, frequency sharing or channel sharing is the assignment to or use of the same radio frequency by two or more stations that are separated geographically or that use the frequency at different times. It reduces the potential for mutual interference where the assignment of different frequencies to each user is not practical or possible.

== Channel sharing in digital television ==
U.S. mobile data usage in 2017 was 40 times that in 2010, forcing frequencies to be reallocated. The FCC's 2016 auction allowed two or more stations to share a single 6 MHz television channel while retaining their licenses and all rights.

NBC sold the spectrum of three of its stations in the 2017 FCC auction: WNBC New York, Telemundo WSNS-TV Chicago and WWSI Philadelphia. Other NBC stations in the market would begin channel sharing with those stations; for instance, Comcast moved Channel 28 WNBC onto Telemundo's Channel 35 WNJU, broadcasting both stations from WNJU's antenna. Stations had to either channel-share with another TV station in this way or go off the air by Jan. 23, 2018.
