= Class A television service =

US system for regulating low-power television

The class A television service is a system for regulating some low-power television (LPTV) stations in the United States. Class A stations are denoted by the broadcast callsign suffix "-CA" (analog) or "-CD" (digital), although very many analog -CA stations have a digital companion channel that was assigned the -LD suffix used by regular (non-class-A) digital LPTV stations.

The FCC created this category of service as a result of the Community Broadcasters Protection Act of 1999. Support for this ruling came largely from the Community Broadcasters Association, an industry group representing low-power TV station operators.

Unlike traditional LPTV stations, class-A stations were given primary status during the transition to digital television (DTV), meaning that a full-service television station could not displace a class A LPTV station from its broadcast frequency (TV channel), except in rare cases. In contrast, traditional LPTV stations often found their frequencies assigned to full-service DTV operations, forcing them to relocate to another frequency. This was especially true in large cities, where available broadcast spectrum was scarce, and LPTV stations found themselves forced to cease operations due to no suitable spectrum. This was especially so with the taking of the 600 MHz band and 700 MHz band (channels 38 to 69) from the upper UHF TV band.

== Requirements ==
In exchange for the added broadcast protections, class-A stations are required to be more responsible in covering the community they serve. Class-A stations must:

- Broadcast a minimum of 18 hours per day
- Broadcast an average of at least three hours per week of programming produced within the media market area served by the station
- Be in compliance with the Commission's requirements for both LPTV stations and full-power television stations
- Broadcast on a core frequency (channels 2 - 36)
- Broadcast the minimum required amount of Children's "E/I" core programming
- Be capable of airing Emergency Alert System broadcasts when/if the need arises

An LPTV station could also qualify for class-A status if it follows the FCC's "public interest, convenience, and necessity" standards.

== Limitations ==
A class-A television station may obtain a license to broadcast digitally at not more than 15 kW UHF or 3,000 watts VHF, but is not required to do so. These are the same maximum power levels as for unprotected (secondary) low-power television stations.

Unlike full-service stations, class-A television stations are not subject to limits on common ownership which restrict full-power twinstick or duopoly operations; they were required to cease analog broadcasting in 2015, as opposed to 2009 for full-power stations. They also were not required to simulcast their programming in analog and digital format during the US digital transition, unlike most full-service stations.

Despite the name of the act of law which created it, there is no requirement that a class-A station be an independent or community broadcaster, and some class-A stations are simply used as broadcast translators for other stations. In some communities, existing full-service broadcasters have operated an analog class A station together with a simulcast as a digital subchannel of a main full-service station, as a means to affiliate with two national TV networks.

== See also ==
- Low-power broadcasting
- List of North American broadcast station classes
