= Joe Wallach =

American television executive (1923–2026)

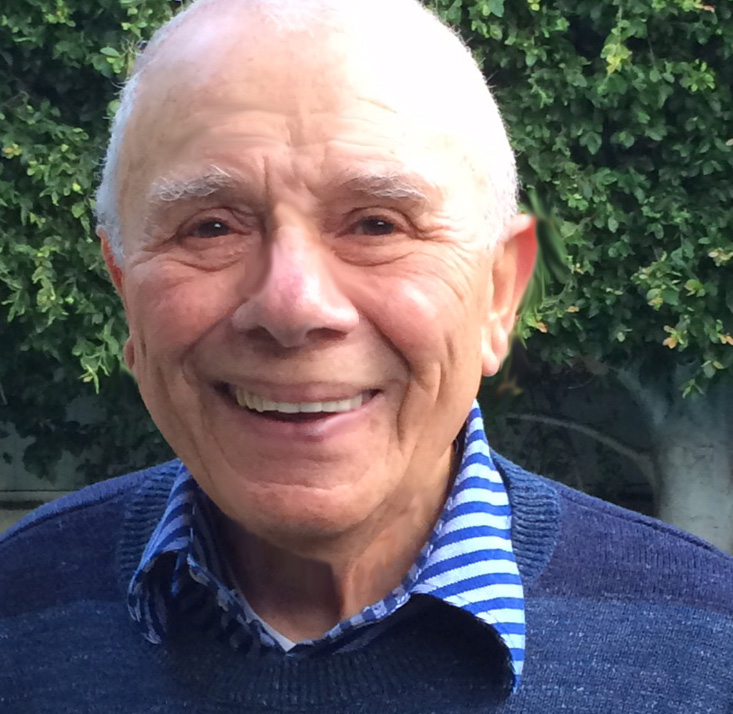
- Born: Joseph Wallach; September 10, 1923; New York City, U.S.
- Died: November 2026 (aged 103)
- Occupations: Businessman, television broadcasting executive, author
- Spouse: Doreen Toll (m. 1990)

Joseph Wallach (September 10, 1923 – November 2026) was an American businessman, television broadcasting executive and author. In 1985, Wallach, along with Saul Steinberg and Henry Silverman of Reliance Capital Group L. P., founded Telemundo, which is today the second-largest Spanish-language television network in the United States.

== Early career ==
Wallach attended Boston University for post graduate studies in business after receiving a BBA from the City College of New York. He served as a 1st Lieutenant in the U.S. Army Infantry in World War II Europe. Wallach's career in broadcasting began in 1960 as business manager and then general manager of San Diego–based television station KOGO-TV, owned by Time-Life Broadcast Corporation from 1962 to 1970. In 1965, Wallach moved to Brazil to oversee another Time-Life venture, TV Globo in California. Under Wallach's guidance, by 1980, TV Globo grew to dominate the Brazilian market and became the 4th largest network in the world, with 31 affiliates and programming provided to 80 countries. Wallach became a Brazilian citizen in 1971.

== Telemundo ==
In 1985, Wallach obtained an option to purchase television channel 52 in Los Angeles with a plan to make the station a Spanish language channel. He secured Reliance as major stock shareholder and purchased channel 52 through Estrella Communications. As general manager, he engaged Paul Niedermeyer as assistant manager and Frank Cruz as director of public affairs. KVEA was launched in November, 1985, and in six months captured 40% of the Los Angeles Spanish television market. In 1986, Reliance purchased television channels in various other markets to create a Spanish language network. Wallach and his team, named it "Telemundo". Wallach managed the Telemundo network until his departure in March of 1987.

== Post-Telemundo ==
After leaving Telemundo in 1987, Wallach was a consultant for the Italian network, Tele Monte Carlo, owned by TV Globo. In 1991, Wallach founded Globosat, the satellite broadcasting service based in Rio de Janeiro. As president of Globosat, he launched and operated the first pay television, 4-channel DBS broadcast system covering Brazil.

== Personal life and death ==
In 1990, Wallach married Doreen Toll in Bel Air, California. He died in November 2026, at the age of 103.

== Published works ==
Wallach was the author of the autobiographical book, My Chapter in TV Globo (Meu Capítulo na TV Globo), Portuguese-language, published by Top Books, Rio de Janeiro, 2011.
