= Stephen M. Peck =

American investor and philanthropist

- Born: February 2, 1935; New York City, US
- Died: March 30, 2004 (age 69)
- Education: Fieldston School; University of Pennsylvania
- Occupations: Investor; Philanthropist
- Known for: Co-founder of Weiss, Peck & Greer
- Spouses: Barbara Rubin Peck (divorced): Judith Stern Peck
- Children: 3 (and 3 stepchildren)

Stephen M. Peck (February 2, 1935 – March 30, 2004) was an American investor and philanthropist who co-founded the asset management firm Weiss, Peck & Greer.

== Early life and education ==
Stephen Martin Peck was born to a Jewish family on February 2, 1935, in New York City, U.S. He was the third child and only son of Helen (née Epstein) and Barney Peck, a partner in a Wall Street brokerage firm and member of the New York Stock Exchange. Barney Peck, who began his career as a runner for Herrick, Berg and Co., was committed to youth charities and an active supporter of Camp Williams, which provided free vacations to underprivileged children.

Peck graduated from the Fieldston School in New York and with a bachelor's degree in economics from the Wharton School of Business at the University of Pennsylvania.

== Career ==
In 1956, aged 21 and still attending college, Peck became the youngest ever member of the New York Stock Exchange when his father bought him a seat. They then worked together at the specialist firm which became known as Barney Peck & Son. After his father died unexpectedly just a year later, Peck formed S.M. Peck & Company, with his mother Helen serving as a limited partner.

In 1970, Peck co-founded the private investment firm Weiss, Peck & Greer with Philip Greer and brothers Roger and Stephen H. Weiss. Weiss Peck offered investment-management, private equity, venture-capital and clearing services. With assets under management in excess of $16.5 billion, it was acquired by Dutch asset manager Robeco in 1998. In 1971, at age 36, Peck was named vice chairman of the New York Stock Exchange's board of governors. In 1985, he joined Saul Steinberg at the insurance company Reliance Group Holdings as the firm's chief investment officer. Throughout his career Peck served on numerous corporate boards including those of Tiger International Inc. and Advance Auto Parts, the company led by his college roommate Nicholas F. Taubman.

== Philanthropy ==
Peck was a distinguished philanthropist. He served on the boards of Mount Sinai Medical Center for more than 30 years, including six years as chairman. From 1985 to 1992, he served as chairman of the board of the Jewish Theological Seminary of America. He was an active benefactor of his alma mater Wharton, and a leading supporter of the UJA-Federation of New York, serving as a longtime board member and chair of its Wall Street Division. Together with his wife Judy, Peck also led the revitalization of the prominent Manhattan synagogue B'nai Jeshurun starting in the 1980s.

== Personal life ==
Peck married twice. He was first married to Barbara Peck (née Rubin), whose sister Sandra had married into the Lasdon family. They had three children: Bradford Peck, Jennifer Peck, and Suzanne Peck. He also had three stepchildren from his second marriage to Judith Stern Peck (previously married to Leonard N. Stern): Andrea Stern, Emanuel Stern, and Edward Stern. Jennifer Peck was married to Craig Barnett, a son of Victor Barnett and Helaine M. Barnett. They divorced. All of his children and stepchildren are active in the Jewish faith. Peck and his wife Judy resided at The Dakota in Manhattan and in East Hampton. Peck died after complications resulted from a heart procedure on March 30, 2004. His funeral was held at B'nai Jeshurun.
