= WNJU =

Television station in Linden, New Jersey

- Linden, New Jersey; New York, New York; United States
- City: Linden, New Jersey
- Channels: Digital: 35 (UHF), shared with WNBC; Virtual: 47
- Branding: Telemundo 47

Programming
- Affiliations: 47.1: Telemundo; 47.2: TeleXitos

Ownership
- Owner: Telemundo Station Group; (NBC Telemundo License LLC)
- Sister stations: WNBC

History
- First air date: May 16, 1965
- Former call signs: WNJU-TV (1965–1988)
- Former channel numbers: Analog: 47 (UHF, 1965–2009); Digital: 36 (UHF, until 2019); Translator: 62 W62AA
- Former affiliations: Independent (1965–1987); NetSpan (secondary, 1984–1987)
- Call sign meaning: New Jersey UHF

Technical information
- Licensing authority: FCC
- Facility ID: 73333
- ERP: 575 kW
- HAAT: 496 m (1,627 ft)
- Transmitter coordinates: 40°42′46.8″N 74°0′47.3″W

Links
- Public license information: Public file; LMS
- Website: www.telemundo47.com

WNJU (channel 47) is a television station licensed to Linden, New Jersey, United States, serving the New York metropolitan area. It is one of two flagship stations of the Spanish-language network Telemundo (alongside WSCV in Miami–Fort Lauderdale), and is owned and operated by NBCUniversal's Telemundo Station Group. Under common ownership with NBC flagship WNBC (channel 4), the two stations share studios at 30 Rockefeller Plaza in Midtown Manhattan and broadcast from the same transmitter at One World Trade Center; WNJU's former studios, located on Fletcher Avenue in Fort Lee, New Jersey, are used as WNJU and WNBC's New Jersey news bureau.

Conceived to replace WNTA-TV as northern New Jersey's commercial station and to provide specialty ethnic programming in the tri-state area, WNJU began broadcasting on May 16, 1965. It was the first new commercial TV station for the New York City area in 16 years. Within months, 60 percent of its programming was in Spanish. The station was acquired by Screen Gems in 1970; Screen Gems also owned WAPA-TV in San Juan, Puerto Rico, with which channel 47 shared programming. WNJU's program lineup, which catered to the tastes of the Puerto Ricans and Dominicans in the tri-state area, often outperformed the Spanish International Network and its mostly Mexican shows in the local ratings. The studio sold the station in 1979 to a consortium headlined by Norman Lear and Jerry Perenchio, but plans to convert to subscription television operation were scrapped.

In 1984, WNJU became a part of a second Spanish-language television network, NetSpan. After Reliance Capital, which had bought Spanish-language TV stations in Los Angeles and Miami, acquired the station, it became a charter owned-and-operated station of Telemundo upon its launch on January 12, 1987. At the same time, channel 47 began producing local Spanish-language newscasts. NBC acquired Telemundo in 2002 and relocated WNJU to its former facility in Fort Lee.

== History ==
=== Early years ===
On December 17, 1962, the New Jersey Television Broadcasting Company was granted a construction permit by the Federal Communications Commission (FCC) to build a new commercial television station on a channel 47 allocation that belonged to New Brunswick. (Note: A television station could be placed in any city within 15 miles (24 km) of the actual allocation, as Linden is to New Brunswick.) Edwin Cooperstein, the president of the permittee and director of radio and television at Fairleigh Dickinson University and who had been the head of WNTA-TV (channel 13) when it was a commercial outlet, had proposed the station a year earlier, to transmit from a tower in the New Jersey Meadowlands. FDU influence was also felt in the company's ownership: it was primarily owned by Henry Becton (son of Maxwell Becton, co-founder of Becton Dickinson) and Fairleigh Dickinson Jr. (son of Fairleigh S. Dickinson Sr., founder of Fairleigh Dickinson University and also the co-founder of Becton Dickinson).

Channel 47 in Linden was a backup plan: the company had previously asked for the assignment of channel 14 to Newark, the city of license of WNTA-TV, arguing that the conversion of WNTA-TV to noncommercial WNET effectively gave all seven VHF stations to New York City. Even before filing for the permit, New Jersey Television Broadcasting had set up in the Mosque Theater (now Newark Symphony Hall) at 1020 Broad Street in Newark, WNTA-TV's former home, which included a 10,000-square-foot (930 m^{2}) studio that was the largest at any non-network TV station in the United States; it announced it would use the former WNTA-TV transmitter site in West Orange and stocked its staff with several channel 13 veterans. When the permit was issued, Cooperstein announced that the station would launch in late 1963.

However, within a month of obtaining the permit, the new WNJU-TV decided on an Empire State Building site for its transmitter, which was approved by the FCC in April 1964. Cooperstein felt that this would be necessary to have picture quality parity with the New York stations. It had settled on a program format of shows for New Jersey audiences during the day and specialty ethnic programs at night. In March 1965, the station revealed a schedule with 19 hours a week of Spanish-language programming and another seven hours for Black audiences.

WNJU-TV signed on the air on May 16, 1965, as the first commercial UHF station in the New York television market and the first new commercial service for the area in 16 years. Channel 47's schedule included New Jersey programs as well as Spanish-language, Black, Jewish, and Italian programs, but even within three months of launch, sixty percent of WNJU-TV's broadcast hours consisted of Spanish-language output. Outside of these programs, during the mid-1960s, the station broadcast a live and locally produced teenage dance show called Disc-O-Teen, hosted by John Zacherle; bullfights; and a folk music program, Rainbow Quest, hosted by Pete Seeger. The station also broke ground when it accepted advertising for Puerto Rican rum; since most television stations (but not channel 47) subscribed to the Code of Good Practice of the National Association of Broadcasters, it was the first hard liquor ad seen on American television.

In 1967, WNJU-TV went all-color and also became the first New York-area television station to automate its transmitter; it opted not to move to the World Trade Center when it was built for financial reasons. In 1969, it added another type of specialty program to its diverse slate: daytime coverage of the stock markets. That same year, however, Cooperstein resigned, citing a "basic policy difference" with the board of directors.

=== Screen Gems ownership ===
WNJU-TV was sold in the fall of 1970 for $8 million (a fairly high price for a UHF station in that time) to Screen Gems Broadcasting, a subsidiary of Columbia Pictures. Screen Gems was unusually suited for the station, as it owned WAPA-TV in San Juan, Puerto Rico. In 1968, WNJU originated a program for WAPA-TV, which represented the first live satellite connection from New York to San Juan.

In 1975, WNJU-TV received a short-term license renewal for only one year (instead of the then-customary three) for failure to abide by a previous pledge to limit commercials to 16 minutes per hour, which the station exceeded more than 16 percent of the time.

The station had evolved to carry mostly Spanish programming, along with some ethnic brokered programs that aired on weekends including shows in Japanese and Portuguese. Sales doubled from $2.2 million in 1976 to $4.4 million in 1978. By focusing on the large Puerto Rican community in New York, WNJU was able to beat the Spanish International Network (SIN)'s WXTV (channel 41), with its comparatively more Mexican programming, in the ratings.

=== To STV or not to STV ===
In 1978, Columbia Pictures applied for authority to broadcast subscription television (STV) programming on WNJU-TV, with the STV franchisee being National Subscription Television–New York, Inc., owned by Oak Communications and Chartwell Communications. These companies were the partners in the Los Angeles operation of ON TV, which had started in that city in 1977 and became the largest such operation in the United States; a pact in November 1978 gave the New York market to Chartwell to develop. Concern was noted over the potential displacement of Spanish-language programming from prime time on channel 47, but the deal was approved.

Jerry Perenchio, one of the shareholders in Chartwell, and his Tandem Productions acquired 80 percent of WNJU-TV from Columbia Pictures in late 1979 for $5 million. Chartwell gave the idea of bringing ON TV to New York serious thought; it pursued rights to the New York Yankees at a reported offer of $20 million a year and lost. It also proposed using the multichannel audio capability of the STV system to present some programs in English and Spanish simultaneously. A technical improvement also came in 1980, when WXTV and WNJU were approved to move to the World Trade Center.

The idea of turning channel 47 into a subscription station was dropped in January 1981, with competition from Wometco Home Theater (which had operated in the tri-state area since 1977), extensive cable penetration, and the station's existing ratings leadership over WXTV for Spanish-speaking audiences cited among the reasons for terminating the plans. Channel 47 continued to be Spanish-language, though other suitors made unsolicited offers, some of which would have ended that status. In 1985, Grant Broadcasting System made a $65 million offer for the station, which was rejected as far too low.

=== NetSpan and Telemundo ===
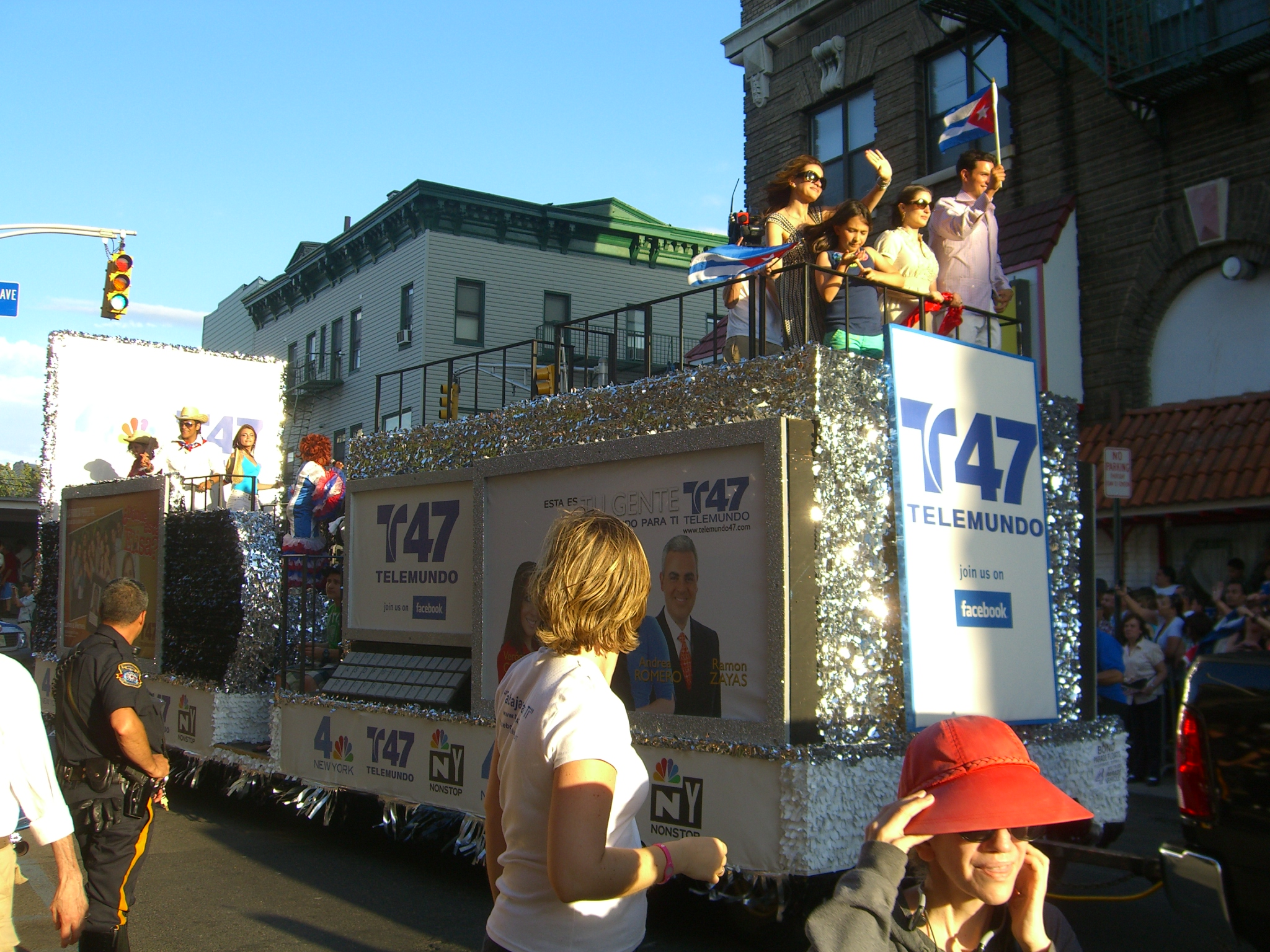
A float representing WNJU Telemundo 47 at the Cuban Day parade at Union City, New Jersey.

In 1970, Carlos Barba, a former Cuban TV star who had been WAPA-TV's general manager, became the general manager of WNJU; he was promoted to president in 1980. In 1984, Barba led the creation of NetSpan, a second Spanish-language network to compete with SIN. NetSpan's founding affiliates were WNJU, ethnic independent KSCI-TV for the Los Angeles market, and Chicago's WBBS-TV. That same year, channel 47 relocated from Newark to a new one-story building in Teterboro, and Barba hired a 22-year-old Nely Galán to be the station manager.

ON TV folded in 1985, and on the way out, it made two major contributions to the launch of a second Spanish-language television network by selling Los Angeles-area KBSC-TV to Estrella Communications, a Reliance Capital-backed group that converted it to Spanish as KVEA, and Fort Lauderdale, Florida, station WKID to John Blair & Co., which relaunched it as Spanish-language WSCV. By 1986, KVEA had replaced KSCI (and WCIU-TV had entered in Chicago); the network offered three hours a day of programming plus specials. Reliance Capital Group, which also was in the process of buying WSCV, reached a deal to acquire WNJU-TV for $70 million in October 1986. Two higher offers had been made by groups that would have converted channel 47 to English-language operation, both of which were shunned.

With WNJU and WSCV now Reliance-owned, on January 12, 1987, NetSpan became Telemundo, supplying additional programming and national news programming. The station continued to air weekend programs in other languages into the 1990s, including Indian, Greek, Haitian and Pakistani programs. During the 1990s and early 2000s, the station experimented with Spanish-language sports simulcasts, which included games of the Yankees, New York Knicks, and New York CityHawks. However, local ratings fell as New York viewing habits fell more in line with national ones and Univision came to dominate in national and local programming.

In October 2001, NBC (then owned by General Electric) announced its acquisition of Telemundo and WNJU, creating a duopoly with WNBC; NBC would assume control in April 2002. The purchase led to a major overhaul of the on-air product at the network and the station. In 2004, WNJU relocated from Teterboro to the sixth floor at 2200 Fletcher Avenue in Fort Lee, occupying the former studios and offices of the NBC-owned CNBC cable network, which had moved to a state-of-the-art new studio complex in Englewood Cliffs; the space was more than twice the size of the Teterboro facility.

After the September 11 attacks, WNJU was one of several stations that moved to the Alpine Tower provisionally. There was no space for a digital facility at the Empire State Building, so a permanent site in West Orange was used along with a secondary transmitter at 4 Times Square to improve signal levels in Queens and on Long Island. However, channel 47's analog facility returned to the ESB. On May 17, 2017, WNJU announced it would begin over-the-air nighttime transmission testing from One World Trade Center in the fourth week of May 2017, which they expected to commence seven to 10 days later; by the end of the year, WNJU and four other New York City-area TV stations began broadcasting from the new tower, which also inaugurated a channel sharing arrangement between WNBC and WNJU for reasons mentioned further below.

On January 14, 2022, WNJU announced that it would move its studios into NBC's headquarters at 30 Rockefeller Plaza in Midtown Manhattan in late 2023, sharing the second floor space with WNBC; New York City was the last NBC–Telemundo duopoly market where the two networks' stations maintained separate facilities. In August 2022, NBCUniversal indicated that it would split Studio 3B, former home of NBC Nightly News and Today, between WNJU and WNBC.

== News operation ==
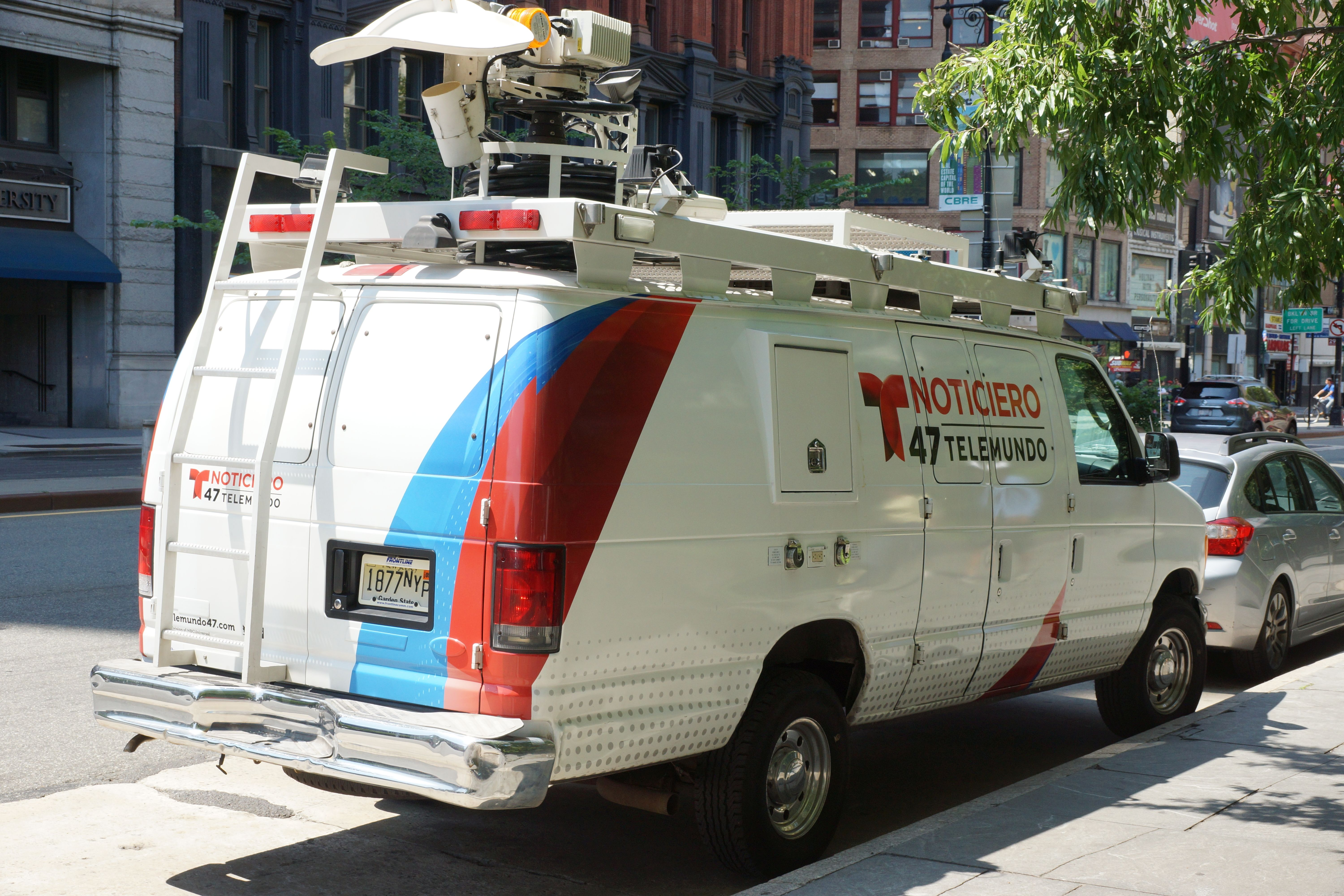
A WNJU news van on the streets of New York City

WNJU launched its news operation in the mid-1980s, with 6 p.m. newscasts anchored by Jorge L. Ramos; an 11 p.m. edition followed in 1996. In 1997, it launched a weekend edition of Noticiero 47; a morning newscast called Noticiero 47 Primera Edición followed in 2001. However, due to company-wide cutbacks, WNJU pulled the plug on its morning, midday, and weekend newscasts in 2009.

Weekend newscasts were restored in 2011, along with the launch of a new public affairs show, Enfoque New York. In November 2012, a new morning newscast was introduced, called Buenos Días, Nueva York.

On September 18, 2014, Telemundo announced a new 5:30 p.m./4:30 p.m. newscast for all 14 of its owned-and-operated stations, including WNJU. On September 26, 2016, WNJU and other Telemundo stations added a 5 p.m. newscast, creating a full hour block with the 5:30 p.m. newscast. On January 22, 2018, a noon newscast was added at 10 Telemundo stations, including WNJU.

=== Notable former on-air staff ===
- John F. Bateman – host, Rutgers Football Highlights
- Brook Benton – host, The Brook Benton Show
- Buck Canel – anchor, Spanish News and Sports
- Myer Feldman – host, Jewish Issues
- Hal Jackson – host, World of Entertainment
- Helen Meyner – Helen Meyner Program
- Jorge L. Ramos – anchor
- Jackie Robinson – host, A Time to Talk
- Myrta Silva – host, Una Hora Contigo (An Hour With You)
- Billy Taylor – host, Jazz in America
- Richard Voliva – host, High School Wrestling
- Zacherley – host, Disco-Teen

== Technical information and subchannels ==
WNJU and WNBC transmit using WNJU's spectrum from an antenna atop One World Trade Center. The stations' signals are multiplexed:

Subchannels of WNJU and WNBC
| License | Subchannel | Res. | Short name | Programming |
|---|---|---|---|---|
| WNJU | 47.1 | 1080i | WNJU-HD | Telemundo |
| WNJU | 47.2 | 480i | TeleX | TeleXitos |
| WNBC | 4.1 | 1080i | WNBC | NBC |
| WNBC | 4.2 | 480i | COZI-TV | Cozi TV |
| WNBC | 4.3 | 480i | CRIMES | NBC True CRMZ |
| WNBC | 4.4 | 480i | OXYGEN | Oxygen |

=== Analog-to-digital conversion ===
WNJU discontinued regular programming on its analog signal, over UHF channel 47, on June 12, 2009, as part of the federally mandated transition from analog to digital television. The station's digital signal remained on its pre-transition UHF channel 36.

On April 13, 2017, it was revealed that the over-the-air spectrum of sister station WNBC had been sold in the FCC's spectrum reallocation auction, fetching $214 million; WNBC would remain in operation, sharing broadcast spectrum with WNJU. The shared broadcast took effect on April 2, 2018. WNJU and WNBC later changed channels again to digital channel 35 on August 1, 2019.
