= Jorge L. Ramos =

Puerto Rican television journalist, correspondent

Jorge Luis Ramos
- Born: March 25, 1950 (age 76); Santurce, Puerto Rico
- Occupation: Journalist
- Notable credit(s): Anchor and Correspondent (Telemundo WNJU)
- Spouse: Yolanda Ramos
- Family: Gabriel Ramos (son) and Alejandra Ramos (daughter)
- Website: Official profile

Jorge L. Ramos (born March 25, 1950) is a retired eight-time Emmy Award winning senior anchor of the evening news on Telemundo's New York City affiliate, WNJU. A pioneer in the field of Spanish-language broadcasting, Ramos began his career in 1979 as the first reporter of the station's newly founded news division, El Informador (Later known as Informador 47, Now known as Noticiero 47) which went on the air in 1980.

Ramos was born in Santurce, Puerto Rico and graduated from the University of Puerto Rico with a degree in humanities. In the early 70s he worked at radio stations WKVM and WQBS, both located in Santurce, Puerto Rico. Ramos moved to New York City in 1976.

In his years at Telemundo, Ramos has covered numerous elections and inaugurations in the United States and Puerto Rico.

In November 2002, Ramos introduced the popular segment Crimenes sin Resolver (Unsolved Crimes). Since its inception, his reports have led to the capture and conviction of four dangerous fugitives. Raymond Kelly, Commissioner of the New York City Police Department awarded Ramos a special recognition for his work on the program.

During the tragedy of September 11, 2001, Ramos and the Noticiero 47 news team stayed Live on the air for six consecutive days with no commercial interruptions. The station was one of the few local New York stations that remained on air immediately following the attacks.

Ramos is married to Yolanda Ramos, a psychologist and host of a Christian radio morning show. They are parents of two grown children: Gabriel, a veteran of the United States Marine Corps, and Alejandra, a TODAY Show contributor. Ramos and his wife presently reside in northern New Jersey.

== Retirement ==
On August 16, 2018, Ramos announced his retirement from WNJU Telemundo 47 station after 40 years. His final newscast was on Friday, September 21, 2018.

== See also ==
- List of Puerto Ricans
