= The Death of Adonis (Rubens) =

Painting by Peter Paul Rubens

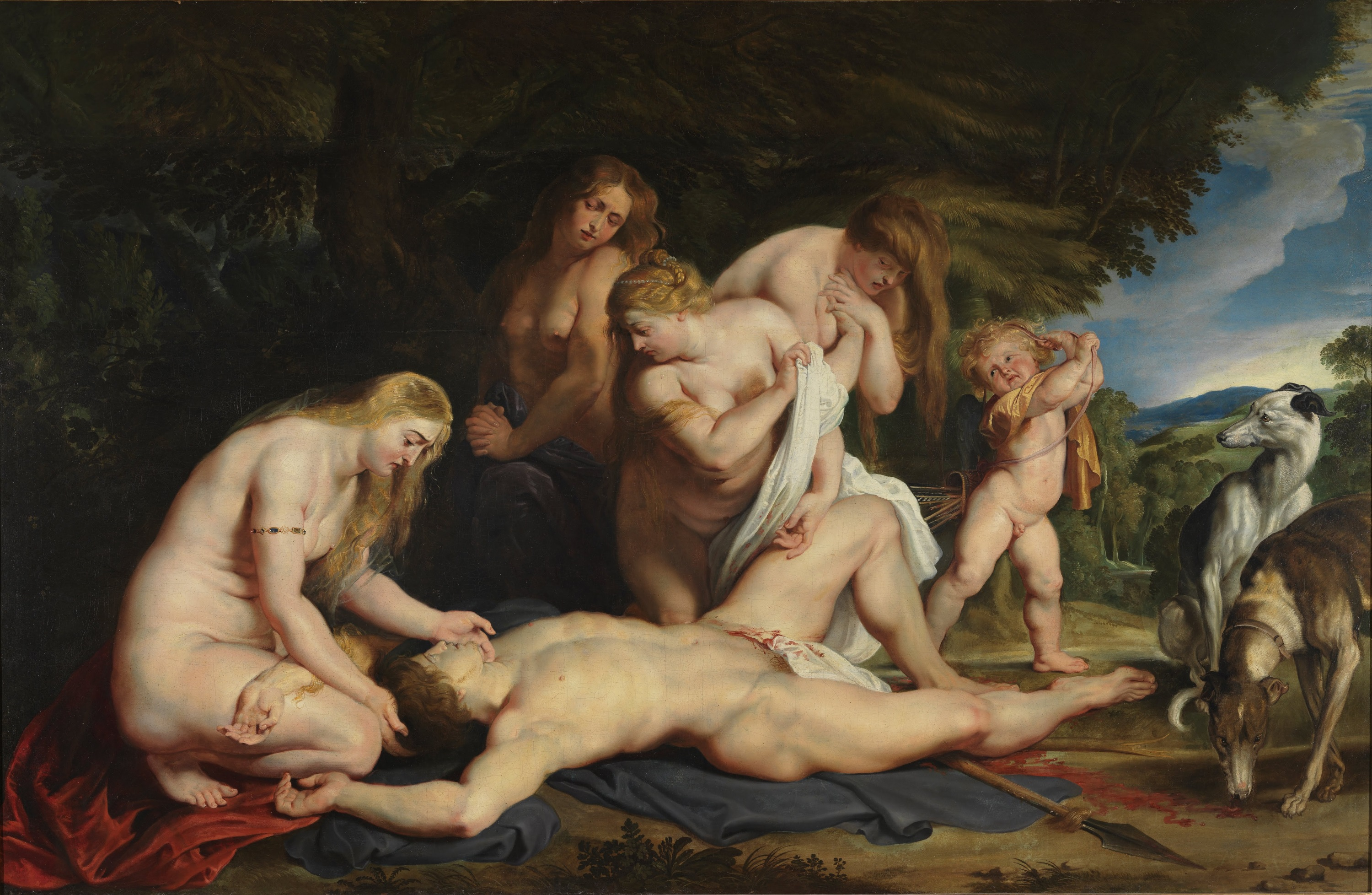
The Death of Adonis (c. 1614) by Rubens

The Death of Adonis is a painting by Peter Paul Rubens, executed c. 1614, now in the Israel Museum in Jerusalem. It shows the dead Adonis being mourned by Venus, Cupid and the Three Graces.

The painting was donated to the Israel Museum by Saul P. Steinberg.

It represents the mythological episode of the death of the god Adonis by the fangs of a wild boar sent by Artemis. It is one of the most represented moments in the history of art, for example by Juan Bautista Martínez del Mazo, Poussin or Ribera.
