= Stephen H. Weiss =

American investment banker and philanthropist

- Born: 1935
- Died: April 16, 2008 (age 72)
- Education: Cornell University
- Occupations: Investment banker and philanthropist
- Known for: Co-founder of Weiss, Peck & Greer

Stephen H. Weiss (1935, Manhattan – April 16, 2008) was an American investment banker, philanthropist, and former chairman of the Cornell University Board of Trustees.

== Biography ==
Weiss was born to a Jewish family and graduated from Cornell in 1957, where he was a member of the Quill and Dagger society. He began a successful banking career at A.G. Becker & Co., where he served as vice president and board member from 1959 to 1970. He then founded the investment management firm Weiss, Peck & Greer together with his brother Roger, Stephen Peck, and Philip Greer, and served as the CEO and chairman of the board until the company was sold to Robeco in 2001. He then served as a managing director at Neuberger Berman until his death in 2008.

At Cornell University, Weiss was vice-chairman of the board of Trustees from 1983 to 1989 and became chairman until 1997. In 1992, he established the Stephen H. Weiss Presidential Fellows Awards "to recognize faculty members with a sustained record of effective and inspiring teaching." Among other contributions, Weiss also gave a gift to endow the office of the dean at the university's medical college, creating the Stephen and Suzanne Weiss Dean of Weill Cornell Medicine.

Academic offices
Preceded by Austin H. Kiplinger	Chairman of Cornell Board of Trustees; 1989–1997	Succeeded by Harold Tanner
