= La Hora Lunática =

Spanish television show

La Hora Lunática (The Crazy Hour) is a daily one-hour live show aired on Telemundo. It was the first programme to win in its time slot over its competitors on Univisión. The show featured the talents of "Humberto Luna", Mario Ramírez Reyes "El Comodín", "Hugo Armando" & Jackie Torres who welcomed Tito Puente, "Celia Cruz", Marc Anthony, "Julio Iglesias", "Antonio Aguilar", "Vicky Carr" & many more international stars. The show also featured Belkis Proenza, Miguel Angel MasJuan, Luis Enrique De Los Cobos, Lucio Arroyo and singer Sylvia Flores. Jackie Torres produced the show from 1995 until 1996.
