= Mario Ramírez Reyes =

Mario Ramirez Reyes
- Other name: El Comodín
- Occupations: Actor, comedian, writer, director, producer

Mario Ramirez Reyes, also known to Hispanic audiences as El Comodín (Jack of all trades) is a Mexican actor, comedian, writer, director, and producer of film, television, and theater who gained notoriety when he headlined the most luxurious theater show of the 90’s in Mexico: "El Show de las Estrellas" (The Star’s Show) which set attendance records at prominent theaters Teatro Lírico, Aldama, Fru-Fru, Venustiano Carranza, and Teatro Blanquita in Mexico as well as then popular Hispanic theaters in the United States Teatro Los Pinos, Teatro Bay, and Teatro México.

== Actor and Comedian ==
Television executives took notice of Mario and hired him for La Hora Lunática (The crazy hour), a daily variety show from Hollywood, California for the Telemundo Network. Ramirez also got offered his first leading role by then newly formed independent film company Laguna Films in "No hay Derecho Joven" (There is no right young man) where he impersonated Mexico's most celebrated comedy character Cantinflas. Disney also included Mario Ramirez among its talents when he became the voice of Goofy in Spanish. Before the 90s were over, Mario had played the leading role in several Hispanic films: "El Culebrero," "El Güero Estrada," "Acábame de Matar," and "Carga Blanca." He had also guest starred in popular Mexican TV Shows: Siempre en Domingo and "En Vivo."

The new millennium added roles for Mario Ramirez in prominent films "The True Story of Che Guevara" for the History Channel where he portrayed the iconic Che Guevara and Sabotage with Arnold Schwarzenegger for Open Road Films as well as "The Price of the American Dream and "Se la sacó Gaspar" in the independent world of cinema. Mario has also been a TV series regular of "Peor es Nada" for Azteca America and has guest starred on TV shows "Entre Nos," also for Azteca America, "Acceso Total" for Telemundo, "Que no te cuenten" and "100 Latinos Dijeron" for MundoFox, "Con Chile y Limón" for Channel 22, and "Sabadazo" for Televisa and many more. In the United States Mario’s comedy show has been presented at The Improv in Hollywood and at the Million Dollar Theater, Star Theater, Yost Theater, and Fox Theater in California. Ramirez also lends his voice to several characters in the Spanish version of video games Agents of S.H.I.E.L.D. for Marvel and Lego and Halo 2 for Xbox.

== Director and Producer ==
The first decade of the 2000s gives way to Ramirez as a film director with "En la mira de mi gatillo," "Agarren al de los Huevos," "Cuando el poder es…" and "Atrapamos a Bin Laden," which he also starred in and produced. He also produced and starred in urban films "The Price of the American Dream" for Laguna Productions and "Crossing Frontiers" for his own company Jakmar Entertainment for which Mario has also directed theater plays Don Juan Tenorio, "Mi Amigo Cri-Cri," "La Migra no llega a Belén," "Los Latinos son de Puro Vacilón," "El Gallo Lio al rescate de Santa Claus"and produced "La Pasión de Jesucristo" and multiple comedy shows internationally.

== Writer ==
Mario Ramirez has been the senior writer of TV shows La Hora Lunática and "Peor es Nada" as well as feature films "Fuga de Almoloya," "El Señor de los Cerros," "En la Mira de mi Gatillo," "Got Papers" aka "Al Infierno con la Migra," and "Atrapamos a Bin Laden" and the theater plays "La Migra no llega a Belén," "Las Aventuras de mi amigo Cri-Cri," "El Gallo Lío al rescate de Santa Claus," "Los Latinos son de Puro Vacilón," and multiple international live comedy shows.
