= La Cenicienta (TV series) =

American reality television telenovela series

- Created by: Nely Galán and Daniela Koverman
- Presented by: Eva Tamargo Lemus
- Country of origin: United States
- Original language: Spanish (English Subtitles)

Production
- Executive producer: Nely Galán

Original release
- Network: Telemundo
- Release: September 3, 2003

La Cenicienta is an unscripted American reality television telenovela series. It is one of Telemundo's early entries into reality television. La Cenicienta (Cinderella) creator and executive producer is Nely Galán former President of Telemundo.

== Format ==
Known for its scripted soap operas known as telenovelas, La Cenicienta is unscripted. Popularity of the unscripted La Cenicienta increased to English-speaking viewers with Telemundo's introduction of English subtitles. Ms. Minerva Ruvalcaba is herself on La Cenicienta. Ms. Ruvalcaba is a real-life Cinderella seeking true love. She is courted by 20 potential Los Pretendientes (The Suitors) of various age, ethnicity, and occupation. In the show, Ms. Ruvalcaba's dates with the suitors are chaperoned by her Madrina (godmother) Eva Tamargo Lemus. Ms. Lemus is best known in NBC's Passions daytime TV drama. Ms. Ruvalcaba is advised by an astrologer, her two best friends, and a priest in the selection of Prince Charming.

"At the heart of our reality TV is the concept that our audience loves: the love story or the dramatic arc or conflict that is at the heart of telenovela," said Ramon Escobar, executive vice president of programming and production at Telemundo. "Reality has struck a chord because it revolves around human drams and relationships that our audience cares about as well as the aspirational elements that are so popular in our novelas."

La Cenicienta is shot at The Desert Castle in Palm Desert, California.

== Los Pretendientes ==
Name	Age	Nationality	Occupation
Alonso, Lazaro	27	Cuban-American	Marketing Consultant
Biezonsky, Daniel	24	Jewish Mexican	Engineer
Borques, Edwin	30	Ecuadorian	Scriptwriter
Campos, Luis	27	Costa Rican	Finance Director
Coppola, Bernardo	22	Argentinian	Student/Actor
Dugan, Joseph	30	Anglo-American	Post Production/Editor
Fernandez, Alfredo	26	Mexican-American	Financial Analyst/Singer
Huesca, Guillermo	35	Mexican	TV Host/Announcer
Javier, Francisco	32	Salvadoran-Mexican	Business Owner
Jose Rafael	27	Puerto Rican	Writer/Producer
Llobet, Alejandro	29	Spanish	Bartender
Martinez, Andres	24	Colombian	Architect Student
Martinez, Johnny	27	Cuban-American	Scuba Diver
Medrano, Paul	27	Mexican-American	Personal Trainer
Ortiz, Roberto	27	Mexican-American	Model/Singer
Pack, Ramon	30	Mexican-Cuban-Korean	Lawyer
Palma, Pablo	26	Mexican-American	School Teacher
Pou, Michael	29	Cuban-American	Administrative Asst.
Rodriguez, Fabian	26	Colombian	Flight Attendant
Vallarino, Hernan	26	Uruguan	Singer

== La Cenicienta (Cinderella) ==
Ms. Ruvalcaba's personal journey attracted the attention of Nely Galán. Ms. Galán who is CEO of Galan Entertainment, is creator and executive producer of the modern day Cinderella story.

Born in Houston, Texas, and raised in Matamoros, Mexico, Ms. Ruvalcaba is the only daughter of Leandro "Chacho" and Minerva Ruvalcaba (mother also named Minerva)'s five children.

La Cenicienta viewers enhanced Ms. Ruvalcaba's rise in fame and notoriety by continuing their loyal viewership. Overnight from the airing of La Cenicienta, Ms. Ruvalcaba's rise to fame came along with media and Spanish audience praise. Ms. Ruvalcaba signed with The Carlos Alvarado Agency (now Alvarado Rey Agency) to represent her.

== Cinderella controversy ==
Mireya Navarro of The New York Times uncovered Ms. Ruvalcaba's unpublicized secret. Ms. Ruvalcaba is twice divorced with a daughter.

Ms. Galán confirmed the information.

"That's the scarlet letter -- if you have a kid you're used merchandise," said Nely Galán.

Ms. Ruvalcaba does not comment on The New York Times story.

Over 1.5 million viewers tune in to find out who is Ms. Ruvalcaba's Prince Charming. In the finale of La Cenicienta, Ms. Ruvalcaba chooses Alejandro Llobet as Prince Charming. People Espaňol discovers and reports Ms. Ruvalcaba is linked to telenovela actor Mauricio Islas.

La Cenicienta aired primetime for six weeks. Telemundo dropped English subtitles featured on La Cenicienta. Audience demand forced Telemundo to rescind that decision.

== Present day ==
Ms. Ruvalcaba is an entrepreneur who, with her ex-husband Alex Fernandez, own and operate Nuestronegocio a distribution company. Ms. Ruvalcaba lives in Scottsdale, Arizona, with her daughter.
