= Nely Galán =

Cuban-American television producer (born 1963)

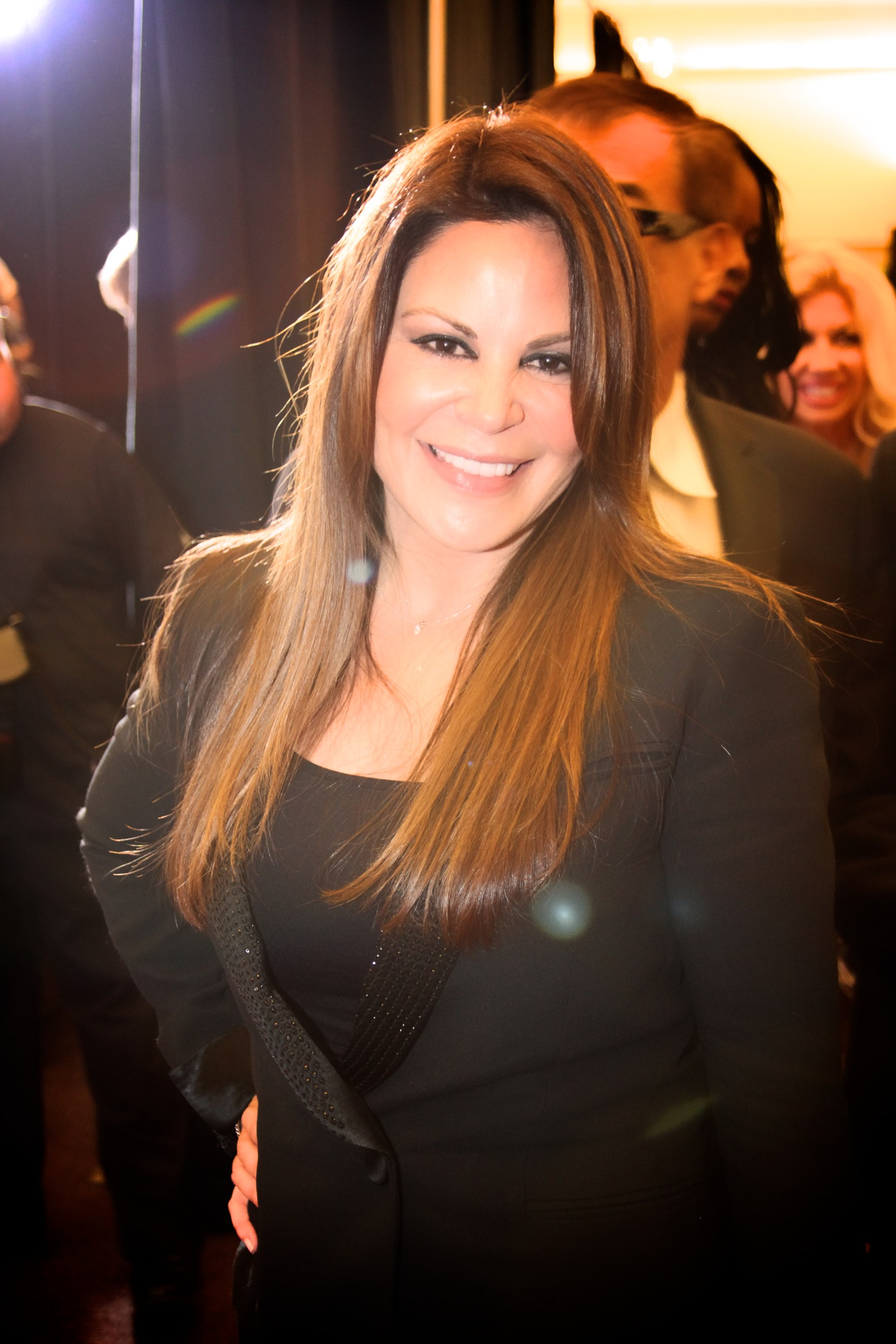
- Galán at the 2013 Alma Awards
- Born: Arnely Alvarez; 1963 (age 62–63); Santa Clara, Cuba
- Occupations: Entrepreneur; producer
- Years active: 1985–present
- Known for: President of Entertainment, Telemundo; The Swan
- Children: 1
- Website: nelygalan.com

Nely Galán (born 1963) is a Cuban-American independent producer and a former President of Entertainment for Telemundo. She created and executive-produced the Fox reality series The Swan.

== Early life ==
Nely Galán was born Arnely Alvarez in Santa Clara, Cuba. Her family moved to Teaneck, New Jersey, in 1967 when she was two years old. During high school, Galán submitted an article to Seventeen that led to a guest editorship and then a permanent position.

== Career ==
At 22, Galán became the youngest station manager in the country, at WNJU (Channel 47) in New York. The station, owned by Jerry Perenchio and Norman Lear, later became the foundation of the Telemundo Network.

Galán created and produced the Telemundo reality television program La Cenicienta (transl. "Cinderella", 2003). Hosted by Eva Tamargo, the program was the network's first unscripted series. It featured Minerva Ruvalcaba as a woman choosing from 20 bachelors. Telemundo added English subtitles to reach both Spanish- and English-speaking audiences. La Cenicienta became one of Telemundo's highest-rated programs in its 50-year history.

In 2004, Galán created and executive-produced The Swan, a reality series on Fox in which women underwent extensive cosmetic surgery to compete in a beauty pageant. The series averaged more than 9 million viewers per episode. Gillian Flynn, writing for Entertainment Weekly, called it "a misogynistic mix of TV's twin vices: commercialism and conformity."

Galán was a contestant on NBC's The Celebrity Apprentice in 2008, competing for the charity Count Me In, which helps women gain economic independence. She was eliminated on 7 February 2008.

In November 2012, Galán joined the advisory board of the Hispanic Scholarship Fund.

== Bibliography ==
- Galán, Nely (31 May 2016). Self Made: Becoming Empowered, Self-Reliant, and Rich in Every Way. ISBN 978-0-8129-8975-5.
