= Telemundo =

American Spanish-language TV network

- Type: Free-to-air television network
- Country: United States
- Affiliates: State; Market
- Headquarters: Miami, Florida, U.S.

Programming
- Language: Spanish
- Picture format: 1080i HDTV (re-scaled to 16:9 1080i for some affiliated channels)
- Timeshift service: Telemundo East; Telemundo West

Ownership
- Owner: NBCUniversal (Comcast)
- Parent: NBCUniversal Telemundo Enterprises
- Key people: Luis Fernández (chairman of NBCUniversal Telemundo Enterprises)
- Sister channels: Bravo; NBC; Universo; TeleXitos; Telemundo Internacional

History
- Founded: 1984; 42 years ago
- Launched: June 19, 1984; 42 years ago
- Former names: NetSpan (1984–1987)

Links
- Website: www.telemundo.com (in Spanish)

Telemundo (Spanish pronunciation: [te.le.ˈmun.do]; formerly NetSpan) is an American Spanish-language terrestrial television network owned by NBCUniversal Telemundo Enterprises, a division of NBCUniversal, which in turn is a wholly owned subsidiary of Comcast. It provides content nationally with programming syndicated worldwide to more than 100 countries in over 35 languages.

The network was founded in 1984 as NetSpan before being renamed Telemundo in 1987 after the branding used on WKAQ-TV, its owned-and-operated station in San Juan, Puerto Rico. In 1997, Liberty Media and Sony Pictures Entertainment acquired controlling interest in Telemundo. NBC then purchased Telemundo in 2001.

The channel broadcasts programs and original content aimed at Spanish-speaking audiences in the United States and worldwide, consisting of telenovelas, sports, reality television, news programming and films—either imported or Spanish-dubbed. In addition, Telemundo operates Universo, a separate channel directed towards younger viewers; Telemundo Digital Media, which distributes original programming content across mass media, the Telemundo and Universo websites; Puerto Rico free-to-air station WKAQ-TV; and international distribution arm Telemundo Internacional.

Telemundo is headquartered in Miami and operates a studio and productions facility in the Miami suburb of Doral, Florida, and has 1,900 employees worldwide. The majority of Telemundo's programs are shot at an operated studio facility in Miami, where 85 percent of the network's telenovelas were recorded during 2011. The average hourly primetime drama costs $70K to produce.

== History ==
Originally launched as NetSpan in 1984, the network was renamed Telemundo in 1987, after the network owners purchased the previous owner of WKAQ-TV (channel 2), a television station in San Juan, Puerto Rico, branded on air as Telemundo. On March 28, 1954, WKAQ-TV signed on. It was originally founded by Ángel Ramos – owner of Puerto Rico's main newspaper at the time, El Mundo, and the U.S. territory's first radio station, WKAQ (also known as "Radio El Mundo"). Ramos wanted to maintain a consistent branding for his media properties based around the "mundo" theme (the Spanish word for "world"), and chose to brand his new television property as "Telemundo" (in effect, translating to "Teleworld" or "World TV"). On April 14, 1983, Ramos sold WKAQ-TV to John Blair & Co.

=== Launch as NetSpan (1984–1987) ===
In 1984, the owners of WNJU (channel 47) in Linden, New Jersey (serving the New York City area), and KSTS (channel 48) in San Jose, California, formed NetSpan, the second Spanish-language television network in the continental United States (behind the longer-established Spanish International Network, the forerunner to Univision). These stations joined KVEA (channel 52) in Los Angeles, run by its general manager and part-owner Joe Wallach, in 1985. The following year, KVEA's part-owner, Reliance Group Holdings, acquired the Telemundo brand when it purchased John Blair & Co., which also owned WSCV (channel 51) in Fort Lauderdale–Miami–West Palm Beach in addition to WKAQ-TV. In late 1986, Reliance also purchased WNJU.

In 1987, Reliance Capital Group executives Saul Steinberg and Henry Silverman merged all these stations into the Telemundo Group. The new corporation quickly went public, and in 1987, Reliance decided to rebrand NetSpan as Telemundo. Later that year, it purchased additional stations in San Francisco, Houston (KTMD, channel 47) and San Antonio (KVDA, channel 60).

Telemundo Group, Inc. traded on the Nasdaq SmallCap Market tier of the Nasdaq Stock Market under the symbol TLMDW.

=== Relaunch as Telemundo (1988–1997) ===
Historic Telemundo logos

Between 1988 and 1993, Telemundo acquired or affiliated with television stations in Texas (KFWD channel 52, in Dallas–Fort Worth, now a ShopHQ affiliate), New Mexico (KTEL-CD channel 47, in Albuquerque), Arizona (KHRR channel 40, in Tucson) and Washington, D.C. (W64BW, channel 64; now WZDC-CD on channel 25). The new network started producing telenovelas from Miami, ending a cycle that started in Puerto Rico in the 1950s. The first such production - Angélica, mi vida, centered around three families of varied Latino immigrant backdrops - was the first such production to be made in the US mainland for the new network.

In May 1992, Telemundo underwent another management change, appointing former Univision president Joaquin Blaya – who resigned from that network after discovering in an FCC filing for Jerry Perenchio's purchase of the network from Hallmark Cards that Univision would increase its reliance on programming from Televisa and Venevision to levels that resulted in him concluding that there would be fewer opportunities for the addition of local programs on Univision's stations, and was subsequently joined by four other Univision executives – to head the network.

The following year in 1993, Telemundo underwent an extensive rebranding, introducing the signature framed "T" letter logo (which has been used by the network since that point in various design elements), and a promotional campaign using the slogan "Arriba, Telemundo, Arriba" ("Upwards, Telemundo, Upwards"). The network also began to produce its own original telenovelas, the first of which to premiere were Angélica, mi vida ("Angelica, My Life"), Marielena, Guadalupe, Señora Tentación ("Lady Temptation") and Tres Destinos ("Three Destinations"). International distributors soon approached the network for the syndication rights to air these programs on television networks in other countries. Telemundo's effort faced an initial setback when Mexico's leading broadcaster, Televisa, purchased production company Capitalvision, which had been producing the telenovelas in conjunction with the network. Parent company Telemundo Group experienced major financial challenges during this time, filing for Chapter 11 bankruptcy protection in 1994, due to a debt load of more than $300 million that the company owed to its creditors.

In an effort to boost its tepid ratings and quell complaints from advocacy organizations such as the National Hispanic Media Coalition that criticized both networks for not featuring content relatable to American Latinos, Telemundo outlined a new strategy to better compete against Univision by increasing production of domestically produced programs. In 1995, under the direction of executive vice president of programming Harry Abraham Castillo, Telemundo opened its first network studio on the West Coast. Housed at Raleigh Studios in Hollywood, the network began daily production of three shows on the lot that year: La Hora Lunática ("The Crazy Hour"), a daytime talk-variety show hosted by Los Angeles radio personality Humberto Luna, comedians Mario Ramírez Reyes "El Comodín" and Hugo Armando, and producer Jackie Torres; El y Ella ("He and She"), a daily talk show focusing on gender-related issues that was created and produced by Gigi Graciette, who co-hosted the program with Antonio Farré; and Dando y Dando ("Giving and Giving"), an audience and viewer participation game show hosted by Rafael Sigler.

The first wave of major changes to Telemundo came on August 11, 1997, when the network revamped its prime time schedule by cutting an hour of its prime time telenovela lineup; concurrently, local newscasts on the network's owned-and-operated and affiliate stations were moved an hour earlier to 10:00 p.m. (or 9:00, depending on the time zone) – placing them directly against late-evening newscasts on Fox, WB, UPN and independent stations in many markets – followed by a late-evening national newscast produced by cable news channel CBS Telenoticias; movies were also added during the 8:00 to 10:00 p.m. Eastern time slot on certain weeknights to help bolster its late newscasts.

=== Liberty Media and Sony Pictures join in (1997–2001) ===
On November 25, 1997, Liberty Media and Sony Pictures Entertainment purchased a majority interest in Telemundo from Reliance Capital Group for $539 million, beating out a bid made days earlier by an investment group led by Telemundo Group chairman Leon Black, who had already owned 40.3 percent of the network through Apollo Global Management and remained a minority partner in Telemundo Group through the purchase; under the deal, Liberty acquired a 40 percent interest and Sony (which made its entry into domestic broadcasting ownership with the deal) acquired a 35 percent stake in Telemundo, with the remaining interest held by investment firms Apollo Global Management and Bastion Capital Fund. On November 25, 1997, several investors who held shares in Telemundo Group filed an injunction to block the sale in a Delaware Chancery Court, in order to investigate whether executives were shortchanging shareholders in accepting the offer; that request, as well as a separate injunction request by Univision Communications, were later rejected.

After the sale received FCC approval on July 31, 1998, Sony and Liberty formed a holding company that was operated as a 50/50 joint venture between both companies, Telemundo Communications Group. Helmed by yet another management team under the leadership of former CBS entertainment president Peter Tortorici as president and CEO and Nely Galán as president of entertainment, Telemundo explored avenues to attract the bilingual market. The network then launched an image campaign using the slogan "Lo mejor de los dos Mundos" ("The Best of Both Worlds"), with several billboard ads being erected in cities such as Miami and San Francisco as part of the campaign, heralding a "new era" for Telemundo.

Tortorici dramatically overhauled Telemundo's schedule in an effort to boost its viewership among American Spanish language audiences, as its total audience share had slid from more than 40 percent early in the decade to less than 20 percent (and only a 13 percent share during prime time) by 1998. This "new era" broke from the conventional Spanish-language programming model, the changes made for the 1998–99 lineup included the complete removal of telenovelas from its prime time schedule, citing the inferior quality of the South American serial dramas that it had been acquiring compared to the Mexican serials from Televisa that were carried by Univision. The revamped evening lineup that premiered on September 28, 1998, included several new sitcoms, traditional scripted dramas and game shows with higher production values, including several scripted shows that were remakes of English language series owned by Columbia TriStar Television (now Sony Pictures Television), to position the network as a younger-skewing alternative to Univision more acculturated to assimilated American Latinos. Among them were Angeles ("Angels"), a remake of Charlie's Angels; Un Angel en la Casa ("An Angel in the House"), a sitcom loosely based on Who's the Boss?; Solo en America ("Living in America"), a remake of One Day at a Time. Also added to the lineup were updated Spanish language versions of The Dating Game, The Newlywed Game and Candid Camera; and the police procedural Reyes y Rey ("Kings and King"). The network's existing prime time novelas were relegated to a three-hour block on weekday mornings, while movies were added in prime time on Tuesday and Thursday nights as part of the showcase "Cinemundo", featuring dubbed versions of recent American film releases (many of which were sourced from the Sony movie library).

In addition, to better take advantage of the region's pool of writers and directors, Tortorici decided to migrate Telemundo's main base of operations – transferring its programming and management divisions – from Hialeah, Florida to a new facility in Santa Monica, California in December of that year, resulting in the hiring or transfer of approximately 45 employees; more than 300 other employees continued to be based at its Hialeah offices. The changes proved to be disastrous as Telemundo's ratings for the overhauled prime time lineup sharply fell by 42 percent to an 8 percent audience share among Latino households against the telenovela-dominated lineup programmed by Univision (which held a roughly 91 percent share) in that slot by the February 1999 sweeps period; the network was even forced to air numerous commercials for free as part of contractual makegoods to advertisers, resulting in a loss of more than $1 million in potential revenue.

After Tortoricci resigned from the network in July 1999, Telemundo tapped former Universal Television president Jim McNamara as its president and chief executive officer, and Alan Sokol as chief operating officer to helm its operations. Their programming strategy reverted to a more traditional approach to Spanish-language television than the mainstream concept implemented by Tortoricci. The new team struck a programming agreement with TV Azteca for the U.S. rights to the Mexican broadcaster's novelas and other programming, and restored a two-hour block of telenovelas originating from Mexico, Colombia and Brazil – later expanded to three hours with the shift of its late local and national newscasts to the traditional 11:00 (or 10:00) p.m. time slot in 2000 – as part of its Monday through Friday prime time slate which resulted in the cancellation of Angeles and Reyes el Rey. Reality, entertainment and newsmagazine programs were also added to the schedule, while prime time movies were relegated to weekend evenings.

In September 1999, Telemundo began transferring the bulk of its programming and marketing operations from its Santa Monica headquarters and consolidated all operations of the network at its offices in Hialeah. Most of the network's management staff migrated to the Hialeah facility including McNamara, Sokol and Galan, either on a temporary or long-term basis, with most other staff being given the option of either accepting the relocation offer or resigning from the network; some positions based at the Santa Monica facility were eliminated, with around a dozen workers remaining at the West Coast office.

During McNamara's tenure, Telemundo premiered shows such as Laura en América ("Laura in America"), a "conflict talk" show hosted by Peruvian lawyer Laura Bozzo; the telenovelas Yo Soy Betty, La Fea ("Ugly Betty", or literally translated as "I Am Betty, the Ugly"), starring Ana Maria Orozco; and a novela adaptation of the Brazilian comedy film Xica, starring Taís Araújo; A Oscuras Pero Encendidos ("In the Dark, but Turned On"), the first Late Night talk show geared at the Hispanic market in the US hosted by Paul Bouche; a game show Números Rojos ("Red Numbers"), hosted by Wilmer Ramirez; and the Argentine children's program Agrandaditos. It also acquired the rights to broadcast a weekly series from World Wrestling Entertainment (WWE) on Saturday nights. The network also entered into a co-production agreement with Columbia TriStar International Television (now Sony Pictures Television International) to produce original telenovelas for Mexican audiences. The network also launched Protagonistas ("Protagonists"), a staged, unscripted reality series that followed a group of 16 aspiring actors living together in a Miami television studio for several weeks, for the opportunity to win a role on one of the network's telenovelas.

=== Second chance (2001–2009) ===
Telemundo's former logo used from 2000 to December 7, 2012

In the summer of 2001, Sony, Liberty and Reliance announced that they would sell Telemundo Communications Group. Companies that expressed interest in acquiring the network included Viacom, the Hispanic Broadcasting Corporation, The Walt Disney Company and AOL Time Warner; National Broadcasting Company, Inc. subsequently entered into negotiations to acquire the network and its related properties.

On October 11, 2001, National Broadcasting Company, Inc. (which itself would merge with Vivendi Universal a year-and-a-half later to become the present-day NBCUniversal) purchased Telemundo Communications Group from Sony and Liberty Media for $1.98 billion (increasing to $2.7 billion by the sale's closure) and the assumption of $700 million in debt, in an equal cash and stock split by NBC parent General Electric. Upon the announcement, many media industry experts thought that NBC overpaid for Telemundo, given the network's lower Hispanic audience reach (attracting about 20 percent of all Hispanic viewers in the United States, while Univision had a reach of about 80 percent). Jim McNamara and Alan Sokol remained at the helm of the network after the acquisition was finalized on April 12, 2002.

Under NBC, Telemundo brought greater emphasis to original programming and product placement, while the network's owned-and-operated stations in larger markets began producing their own early morning newscasts in an effort to become more competitive in their respective markets; the Telemundo "T" logo also received an overhaul, replacing the sphere with a curved outline which similarly represented a globe. Telemundo's main competitor, Univision, continued to beat the network in the ratings, although not in all time periods. In 2004, Telemundo Communications Group formed Telemundo Television Studios (now known as simply Telemundo Studios) in Miami, as part of its expansion of original programming through the acquisition of RTI Colombia's interest in their joint venture Telemundo-RTI, subsequently signing an agreement to acquire the operational assets of its international distributor, Tepuy International (now Telemundo International); the network spent $100 million per year on programming producing during the mid-2000s.

After the NBC Universal merger, Telemundo ceased importing telenovelas from Latin America and started producing its own dramas, either independently or through co-production arrangements with other production companies. To that end, Telemundo partnered with Colombian-based producer RTI Colombia and Mexican production company Argos Comunicación. In an effort for its telenovelas – which follow the Mexican model – to be recognized by U.S. and Latin American audiences, Telemundo hired well-known actors and actresses from Mexico, Colombia, Venezuela, Argentina and Puerto Rico to star in its dramas; over time, Telemundo also began to hire American-born Hispanic actors and actresses who are fluent Spanish speakers. In 2005, McNamara retired as CEO of the network; he was replaced by Don Browne, who had previously served as president and general manager of NBC's Miami O&O (and WSCV sister station) WTVJ.

In March 2007, NBC Universal announced that it would restructure Telemundo's entertainment division in an effort to narrow Univision's ratings dominance. The company also announced its intention to sell the original Telemundo station in Puerto Rico, WKAQ-TV, and Spanish independent station KWHY-TV (channel 22) in Los Angeles in order to help finance its acquisition of Oxygen Media. On December 21, 2007, NBC Universal announced that it would no longer seek a buyer for WKAQ-TV, indicating that Telemundo Puerto Rico would remain within the NBC corporate umbrella.

=== Part of Comcast (2011–present) ===
In 2010, Comcast announced that it would acquire a 51 percent majority stake in NBC Universal for $6.5 billion; the deal was completed on January 28, 2011, with Comcast acquiring control of Telemundo as part of the deal. In October 2011, Emilio Romano was appointed as president of Telemundo, a role he would handle until his abrupt resignation from the network in October 2013.

First variant of the Telemundo's logo from December 8, 2012, to April 3, 2018

On May 14, 2012, Telemundo announced that it would launch a new branding campaign that would include the debut of a new slogan and on-air identity, including the replacement of its framed "T" logo (a variant of the 1992-era design that had been introduced by the network in 1999), with a new logo featuring two partial red spheres forming the "T", described to "capture the duality of Telemundo's audience, balancing the strong connection to their Latin roots with their contemporary mindset of living in the U.S." The new logo and graphics package debuted on-air on December 8 of that year. Telemundo achieved ratings success during 2012, with the telenovela series Rosa Diamante ("Diamond Rose"; a remake of Enrique Torres' Perla Negra) and the Caracol TV-produced Pablo Escobar. That year, Telemundo debuted the "social novela" Secreteando on Facebook, with comments made on other social media websites.

During the 2000s, Univision also lost several key on-air personalities to Telemundo, including longtime weekend news anchor María Antonieta Collins (who left to host the morning program Cada Dia), Primer Impacto anchor María Celeste Arrarás (who became the host of a similarly formatted newsmagazine, Al Rojo Vivo) and sports announcers Andrés Cantor (known to many Americans for his exuberant announcement of "Goal!" during football matches) and Norberto Longo. By the middle of the decade, Univision overtook UPN and The WB – which shut down in September 2006 and were replaced by The CW, which Univision also outranks – as the fifth highest-rated network in total viewership; since then, it also sometimes posts higher viewership in the key age demographics of Adults 18–34 and Adults 18–49.

Other key on-air personalities that joined Telemundo from Univision or Televisa in the 2000s are Gabriela Spanic, Pedro Fernandez, Kate del Castillo, Aracely Arámbula, Raúl González, Blanca Soto, Laura Flores, Ana María Canseco, Cristina Saralegui.

Continuing the momentum in 2013 were telenovelas La Patrona ("The Return") and El Señor de los Cielos ("The Lord of the Skies"), and the musical competition series La Voz Kids ("The Voice Kids"; a Spanish language adaptation of The Voice franchise featuring children as contestants), hosted by Daisy Fuentes and Jorge Bernal, featuring musical coaches Paulina Rubio, Prince Royce and Roberto Tapia. With the debut of El Señor de los Cielos that spring, Telemundo also launched the "Super Series" format, a slate of action-oriented telenovelas – which usually air during the final hour of the network's prime time novela block – designed as a reinvention of the genre using the multiple-season continuity model common with English language drama series, shorter episode runs (between 60 and 80 episodes per season, compared to traditional single-season novelas, which produce between 100 and 200 episodes on average) and the incorporation of storylines more relatable to American audiences.

These programs helped Telemundo decrease its ratings gap in the key demographic of Adults 18–49, decreasing the gap between the two networks by 54 percent between 2010 and 2015, with Telemundo even beating Univision four times during the 2014–2015 television season on nights when the former aired sports events and specials; the network also narrowed the ratings differentials with Univision in total prime time viewership from a gap of 1.2 million viewers in July 2013 to 238,000 in July 2015. Telemundo also began improving its ratings during the 10:00 p.m. (Eastern Time) hour, following its transition from traditional novelas to the "Super Series" format, with El Señor de los Cielos posting some of the network's highest viewership for an entertainment program, when its second-season finale in 2014 drew 3.2 million total viewers.

On May 13, 2014, during the network's 2014–15 upfront presentation at Frederick P. Rose Hall in New York City, Luis Silberwasser was named president of Telemundo Network, LLC, maintaining overall responsibilities for the Telemundo network and production division Telemundo Studios.

On July 21, 2015, Telemundo beat Univision for the first time in a singular-night demographic, averaging 969,000 viewers and a .76 rating in the demographic (26K more viewers and a .2 higher share than the 943K and .74 earned by Univision's prime-time schedule); El Senor de los Cielos 3 ("Lord of the Skies 3") also beat the Televisa-produced novela Yo No Creo En los Hombres ("I Don't Trust Men Anymore") on Univision in the demographic during the 10:00 p.m. hour, with a 1.4 rating (over the 0.7 rating earned by Yo No Creo En Hombres) and was the most-watched television program among Adults 18–49 during the hour that evening. For the week of July 20–24, Telemundo came within 40,000 viewers of beating Univision in prime time viewership. Overall, the network ended the 2014–15 season posting its highest average total prime time viewership against Univision with 1.46M, a 23 percent increase in total viewership yearly, compared to Univision's 2.29M and decrease of 21 percent yearly.

== Programming ==
As of 2015, Telemundo operates on a 147½-hour network programming schedule. Its base programming feed provides various types of general entertainment programming weekdays from 6:00 a.m. to 2:00 a.m., Saturdays from 8:00 to 11:00 a.m. (the first three hours of which are occupied by the children's programming block, MiTelemundo, which features programs compliant with FCC educational programming requirements), and Sundays from 11:00 to 1:00 a.m. Eastern and Pacific Time. A separate block of feature films (and occasionally, other entertainment programs) also airs overnights on Monday through Wednesdays from 3:30 to 5:00 a.m., Thursdays and Fridays from 3:00 to 5:00 a.m., and weekends from 2:00 a.m. to 6:00 a.m. Eastern and Pacific Time. All remaining time periods are filled with infomercials.

While Telemundo's owned-and-operated stations and affiliates largely rely on Telemundo's master schedule to fill their broadcast day, many of its stations also produce their own local programming (which may pre-empt certain programs within the base network schedule), usually in the form of newscasts and public affairs programs (production of local infotainment programming, and leasing of brokered programs such as direct response and religious content, is at the station's discretion). Many Telemundo stations usually air limited local news programming, which are commonly reserved for early and late evening timeslots on Monday through Friday nights; some Telemundo stations may also air newscasts on weekday mornings (these are mainly limited to the network's O&Os in larger markets) or on weekend evenings.

The majority of Telemundo's programming consists of first-run telenovelas and series, many of which are produced by the network itself through its Telemundo Studios unit; however, some shows broadcasts by the network are produced by outside companies (including Caracol Television and Promofilm). Telemundo's schedule does not incorporate situation comedies, although some comedy series have aired on the network in the past, particularly during the 1990s and early 2000s. Variety shows, a common format in Spanish language television in the U.S. and other countries, have had a limited presence on Telemundo's lineup in recent years; with La Voz Kids being the only such show appearing on the network as of July 2013. Two additional variety series debuted in 2015: Si Se Puede, an adaptation of the Armoza Formats celebrity talent competition franchise I Can Do That, and ¡Qué Noche! con Angelica y Raul ("What a Night! with Angelica and Raul"), a family-oriented series using the traditional Saturday evening variety program model that was created to fill part of the void opened up by the cancellation of Univision's Sabado Gigante.

From 2010 to 2013, Telemundo utilized an off-time scheduling format for its prime time programming (similar to the "Turner Time" format used by TBS from 1981 to 2000), in which programs that aired weeknights from 8:00 to 11:00 p.m. (Eastern and Pacific Time) started on a three-minute delay – resulting from intentional overruns of the network's 7:00 p.m. program (Caso Cerrado: Edićion Estelar ("Case Closed: Special Edition")) into the 8:00 p.m. timeslot. As a result, until this format was discontinued, conventional "top-and-bottom" start times were not restored until the evening's final prime time program aired at 10:00 p.m. (Eastern and Pacific), allowing late local newscasts seen on some Telemundo stations to start at 11:00 p.m. (or 10:00 p.m. in the Central and Mountain Time Zones).

Daytime programming on weekdays features a mix of consisting of repeats of past Telemundo-produced telenovelas and acquired serials (which are re-edited as extended 90-minute and two-hour episodes) during the late morning and early afternoon hours, while newsmagazine, reality and court series (such as Caso Cerrado ("Case Closed") and Suelta La Sopa ("Tell Me What You Know")) making up its afternoon programming. The network also regularly airs Spanish-dubbed English-language films (primarily those produced by American film studios such as Universal Pictures, Walt Disney Studios Motion Pictures and Sony Pictures Entertainment) that make up much of the network's weekend afternoon and prime time lineup, as well as films natively produced in Spanish (imported from various Latin American countries) that it usually airs daily during the overnight hours; the network also airs films in place of regularly scheduled programming on select national holidays (such as Thanksgiving and Christmas).

=== English subtitles ===
On-screen bug used on Telemundo for programs captioned in both Spanish (CC1) and English (CC3)

Telemundo provides English subtitles via closed captioning primarily on weekdays from 7:00 to 11:00 p.m. Eastern and Pacific Time, during the network's prime time lineup. The subtitles are transmitted over the CC3 caption channel in standard definition and the CS2 caption channel available on most digital tuners in high definition. The network produces the translations in-house, and intends them to attract Hispanic viewers who may not be fluent in Spanish as well as other non-Spanish speakers. Programs that include English captions are identified on-air by a special digital on-screen graphic seen at the start of each episode, denoting the specific caption channels in which viewers can receive subtitles in either Spanish or English (see right).

Telemundo was the first Spanish-language network in the United States to incorporate English captions during its programming, beginning with the premieres of La Cenicienta ("Cinderella") and Amor Descarado ("Barefaced Love") on September 8, 2003; this generated a small, loyal fan base among English-speaking viewers. The subtitles were briefly discontinued without notice on October 14, 2008, citing budget cuts made by NBC Universal and the network's switch from analog to digital broadcasts; representatives for Telemundo also cited the need to concentrate resources on its core Spanish-speaking audience. However, the network soon reversed its decision due to demand by viewers in favor of the English subtitles, which returned on all prime time novelas on March 30, 2009.

Programs that include English-language captions during their original broadcast may also include them in repeat broadcasts airing outside of the network's prime time schedule after the program's original run on the network or, since 2012, as part of the network's late-night novela repeat block. Some programs (notably the defunct long-running erotic anthology Decisiones ("Decisions"), which the network now airs only in reruns) only include English captions for certain episodes, depending on when they were produced. Programs that use English captions primarily consist of telenovelas, though a few shows outside the genre (such as the prime time court show Caso Cerrado, dating game show 12 Corazones, and various children’s shows featured on the former Qubo programming block like VeggieTales, Babar and Jacob Two-Two) are also transcribed in both languages. Availability of English subtitles is limited to the technical capacity of the local station, cable or satellite provider, or other outlet to disseminate them over the network feed.

Since then, other networks in the United States have utilized the practice of providing closed captions in both English and Spanish. On January 30, 2012, Univision began airing CC3 English captions on its evening programming (primarily with its weeknight telenovelas, along with select weekend prime time series). The now-defunct Azteca America also transmitted English subtitles on certain programs. Conversely, when Qubo spun off into a standalone 24-hour channel on January 8, 2007, the network utilized the CC3 channel to provide Spanish subtitles for certain programs with Spanish audio tracks accessible via SAP, supplementing its primary English captions on the CC1 channel.

=== News programming ===
The network operates a news division, Noticias Telemundo ("Telemundo News"), which produces a half-hour early evening flagship newscast, Noticiero Telemundo, that has aired daily for most of its run (Telemundo also produced a secondary newscast, Noticiero Telemundo Internacional, until 2011, which aired in place of late local newscasts on affiliates without their own news department or which opted to preempt regularly scheduled local newscasts on certain holidays). It also produces the morning news and lifestyle program Un Nuevo Día ("A New Day"), the late afternoon newsmagazine series Al Rojo Vivo con Maria Celeste ("Red Hot Live with Maria Celeste") and the Sunday morning talk show Enfoque ("In Focus"); the network previously produced weekend editions of Al Rojo Vivo and Noticiero Telemundo until 2007, which were replaced with feature films and reality-based series; the latter returned to a daily broadcast with the restoration of Saturday and Sunday editions on September 4, 2014.

The beginnings of the news division trace back to 1987, when the network debuted its first news program Noticiero Telemundo-HBC ("Telemundo-HBC News"), through an outsourcing agreement with the Miami-based Hispanic-American Broadcasting Corporation. The following year, Telemundo outsourced news production to CNN, which produced Noticiero Telemundo CNN ("Telemundo CNN News"), consisting of two Atlanta-based daily newscasts that were anchored by Jorge Gestoso and Maria Elvira Salazar. When Salazar accepted a position as a reporter for Noticiero Univision in Miami, Chilean former Miss Universe Cecilia Bolocco joined Gestoso on the Telemundo newscast. The final incarnation produced in Atlanta was co-anchored by Patricia Janiot. Following the sale of its cable news channel Telenoticias to CBS Cable in late 1996, Telemundo entered into a content partnership with the channel to produce early-evening and prime time newscasts that would air on the broadcast network.

Former CBS News vice president Joe Peyronnin founded Telemundo's news division in 1999 and served as its executive vice president until 2006. Additional news programs were created in the wake of the September 11, 2001 attacks: Hoy en el Mundo ("Today in the World") on ABC News, anchored by Marian de la Fuente and Jose Diaz-Balart (also of NBC News), debuted to inform viewers of national and international events. This program and its companion show En la Madrugada ("In Early Morning") were canceled due to the much heralded arrival of María Antonieta Collins from Univision. Cada Dia with Maria Antonieta ("Every Day with Maria Antonieta") replaced these shows on October 10, 2005; Collins continued to host the program along with the much recycled Diaz-Balart – who anchored the network's morning news program Noticiero Telemundo: Madrugada ("Telemundo News: Early Morning"), later to be anchored by Ana Patricia Candiani – as co-host. Cada Dia was canceled in May 2008, after Collins announced that she would leave Telemundo when her contract expired in August of that year return to news anchoring and as a result of low ratings for the program; it was replaced by a new morning show called ¡Levántate! ("Get Up"), another hybrid news and lifestyle format, which was broadcast out of the studios of WKAQ-TV, and initially produced by Telemundo Puerto Rico. The hybrid program, which was retitled Un Nuevo Día in July 2012, originally included local participation of the network's Miami owned-and-operated station WSCV from its studios in the suburb of Miramar, Florida, and bureaus located in New York City, Los Angeles and Mexico City. The show was later revamped, dropping the local cut-ins and relocating its production operations to Telemundo's headquarters in Hialeah, Florida in February 2011.

=== Sports ===
The network also maintains a sports division, Telemundo Deportes, which superseded the network-operated division Deportes Telemundo when NBCUniversal created the current division within its NBC Sports Group in May 2015. The division, which is responsible for the production of sports content on Telemundo and Universo, produces soccer matches for the network from Liga MX, as well as Olympic qualifying matches. Through broadcasting agreements with NBC Sports, Telemundo also holds the Spanish-language broadcast rights to the Summer and Winter Olympic Games, Spanish play-by-rights to soccer matches from the Premier League and the Spanish-language rights to the NFL primetime game "Sunday Night Football". The network also produces Boxeo Telemundo, a weekly late-night boxing series that airs on most Friday nights (except during the summer) showcasing fights from up-and-coming boxing talents.

In 2014, Deportes Telemundo acquired the Spanish language rights to broadcast the FIFA Men's and Women's World Cup for a reported $600 million. The deal, which began with the 2015 Women's World Cup and runs through 2026, includes rights to associated FIFA-sanctioned tournaments (including the FIFA U-17 and U-20 World Cups, and the FIFA Beach Soccer World Cup), which are telecast on Telemundo and Universo.

In addition, the division also produces two sports-related talk and magazine programs for Telemundo: flagship sports highlight/discussion program Titulares Telemundo ("Telemundo Headlines"), which airs on Saturday and Sunday evenings (and is offered to Telemundo stations on a half-hour tape delay to accommodate local late-evening newscasts); and the daily late-night sports talk show El pelotazo.

=== Children's programming ===
For much of its history, the bulk of NetSpan/Telemundo's children's programming has been derived of mainly live-action and animated programming from American and international producers, including Spanish-language dubs of programs produced in other languages, and Spanish-language programming acquired from other countries.

The network's first foray into children's programming, Telemuñequitos, was in partnership with Warner Bros., and featured Spanish-language dubs of Warner Bros. Cartoons productions. In September 1995, Telemundo launched a Saturday morning block, Telemundo Infantil ("Telemundo Kids"). On September 15, 1998, Telemundo introduced Nickelodeon en Telemundo, a block featuring Spanish dubs of Nickelodeon programming. The block ran on weekday mornings until September 5, 2000, when it was relegated to Saturday and Sunday mornings in order to accommodate a time slot for Hoy En El Mundo. The Nickelodeon blocks were discontinued after September 30, 2001, ahead of the expiry of Telemundo's program supply deal with Nickelodeon. It was then replaced with Telemundo Kids, which featured a mix of acquired programming from various providers, including Sony Pictures Television and later Nickelodeon.

On September 9, 2006, Telemundo debuted Qubo, a new weekend morning block of educational programming formed as a joint venture between NBC Universal, Ion Media Networks, Corus Entertainment, Scholastic, and Classic Media. The block carried Spanish-language dubs of programming acquired or produced for Qubo's English-language blocks on NBC and Ion, airing on Saturday and Sunday mornings in 90-minute blocks.

On July 7, 2012, after the acquisition of NBC Universal by Comcast, the block was replaced by MiTelemundo; programmed by Sprout, it consisted of Spanish dubbed versions of programs seen on its sister broadcast network's Saturday morning block, NBC Kids, which debuted on the same date. With NBC Kids being replaced with Litton Entertainment's The More You Know block on NBC by September 25, 2016, MiTelemundo initially retained its existing programming until January 6, 2018, when MiTelemundo moved exclusively to Saturday mornings and became programmed by Litton. The relaunched MiTelemundo carries Spanish dubs of programming from The More You Know.

=== Specials ===
Telemundo holds the broadcast rights to several annual specials and award show telecasts. From 2003 to 2014, the network held the Spanish language rights to two of the three pageants organized by the Miss Universe Organization: the Miss Universe and Miss USA pageants, through NBC's existing contractual agreement for the pageant. Although parent NBCUniversal held half-ownership in the organization at the time, the rights were obtained by Univision Communications in February 2015 with the intent to move the Miss Universe and Miss USA telecasts to UniMás (Univision later terminated the contract that July following now-former part-owner Donald Trump's remarks in his speech declaring his Republican presidential campaign disparaging Mexicans immigrating into the United States as being mostly made up of those involved in criminal activity, later culminating in Trump's sale of the Miss Universe Organization to WME-IMG in September 2015, after NBCUniversal sold its interest).

Since 1999, Telemundo has served as the official U.S. broadcaster of the Billboard Latin Music Awards ("Premios Billboard a la Música Latina"), an offshoot of the Billboard Music Awards honoring songs from Latin music artists during the previous year that are chosen by viewer voting. In 2012, the network also debuted Premios Tu Mundo ("Your World Awards"), a viewer-decided awards show honoring the achievements of Hispanics and Latinos in media, maintaining a format similar to the People's Choice Awards with categories pertaining to television, film, music, fashion and sports.

In October 2015, through a licensing agreement with Dick Clark Productions signed in July 2014, Telemundo became the originating broadcaster of the Latin American Music Awards ("Premios de la Música Latinoamericana"), a Latin music-focused version of the American Music Awards.

== Stations ==
As of June 2018, Telemundo has 28 owned-and-operated stations, and current and pending affiliation agreements with 66 additional television stations encompassing 50 states, the District of Columbia and the Commonwealth of Puerto Rico; this makes Telemundo the largest American Spanish language broadcast television network by total number of affiliates. The network has an estimated national reach of 57.23 percent of all households in the United States (or 178,837,113 Americans with at least one television set).

While Telemundo does not have any over-the-air stations in a few major markets with relatively sizable populations of Hispanic and Latino residents it conversely maintains affiliations in several markets where Univision currently does not have over-the-air availability, including New Orleans (KGLA-DT), Boise (KKJB) and Richmond (WZTD-LD). Telemundo maintains affiliations with low-power stations (broadcasting either in analog or digital) in a few markets, such as Orlando (WTMO-CD), Milwaukee (WYTU-LD), Tampa (WRMD-CD), Albuquerque (KTEL-CD and its repeater K46GY) and Minneapolis (KMBD-LD). In some markets, including the former two mentioned, these stations also maintain digital simulcasts on a subchannel of a full-power television station, usually (though not in all cases) one owned or managed with the Telemundo outlet.

The network also maintains a sizable number of subchannel-only affiliations, consisting of a mix of stations in cities located within and outside of the 50 largest Nielsen-designated markets; the largest Telemundo subchannel affiliate by market size is WKTB-CD in Norcross, Georgia (serving the Atlanta market), which carries the network on its second digital subchannel. In other areas of the U.S., Telemundo provides a national cable network feed distributed directly to cable, satellite and IPTV providers as an alternative method of distribution in markets without either the availability or the demand for a locally based owned-and-operated or affiliate station.

Currently outside of the network's core O&O group, News-Press & Gazette Company is the largest operator of Telemundo stations by numerical total, owning or providing services to eight primary affiliates (all but one of which are simulcast on subchannels of the group's Big Four network stations) and four additional subchannel-only affiliates). The former ZGS Communications was the largest operator of Telemundo stations in terms of overall market reach, owning ten Telemundo-affiliated stations (including affiliates in larger markets such as Tampa, Orlando, Boston, Hartford and Washington, D.C.); after the purchase of the ZGS stations at the start of 2018 by NBC's Telemundo Stations Group, they are now direct O&Os of the network.

== Related services ==
=== Current sister channels ===
==== Universo ====
Universo is an American digital cable and satellite television network aimed at Latinos between the ages of 18 and 49, featuring a mix of sports, scripted and reality series and music programming (including programs that originated on Telemundo and other NBCUniversal-owned cable networks). It was originally launched on October 10, 1993, as GEMS Television, under the ownership by Empresas 1BC, featuring programs aimed at Latino females. The network was as GEMS Television by former owner and later co-owned with Cox Communications the following year.

Telemundo parents Sony Pictures Entertainment and Liberty Media purchased GEMS in 2001, and relaunched it as mun2 (a portmanteau pun of Telemundo and "dos," the Spanish word for "2," but is intended to reflect the "two worlds" that Latino Americans live in), a network featuring a mix of Spanish and English language programs (including some Spanish-dubbed versions of American programs and series incorporating Spanish language subtitles) aimed at adults ages 18 to 49. On December 24, 2014, NBCUniversal announced that mun2 would be rebranded as NBC Universo – shifting it under the NBC umbrella – on February 1, 2015, to coincide with its Spanish-language broadcast of Super Bowl XLIX.

==== Telemundo Puerto Rico ====
Telemundo Puerto Rico is a digital cable and satellite network that originally launched in December 1994 as Telenoticias, a Spanish-language cable news channel originally serving Latin America (and broadcasting in Spanish and Portuguese) that was developed by Telemundo in partnership with Grupo Clarín (owner of Argentina-based broadcaster Artear), Spain-based Antena 3 and Reuters. Due to struggles in obtaining sufficient viewership and disagreements between its co-owners, the partnership sold Telenoticias to CBS – which rebranded the network as "CBS Telenoticias" – in June 1996; with that sale, the network expanded across the Americas, with distribution in 22 countries. In 1998, CBS later sold Telenoticias back to Telemundo parents Sony Pictures Entertainment and Liberty Media, which subsequently relaunched the network as the bilingual entertainment channel Telemundo Internacional in 2000. In 2006, the channel was reformatted as Telemundo Puerto Rico, becoming a national superstation feed of San Juan O&O WKAQ-TV.

==== TeleXitos ====
TeleXitos is a digital multicast network that was originally launched by the network's parent division Telemundo Television Group in January 2012 as Exitos TV. In its original format, the network primarily featured reruns of telenovelas previously aired on Telemundo, and was exclusive to Telemundo's owned-and-operated stations. The network adopted its current name on December 1, 2014, when it was relaunched with a new focus toward Spanish-dubbed reruns of action and adventure series as well as feature films sourced primarily from the content library of corporate sister NBCUniversal Television Distribution, in addition to featuring select programs from other distributors.

=== Video-on-demand services ===
Telemundo maintains several video on demand services for delayed viewing of the network's programming, including its TV Everywhere service Telemundo Now; a traditional VOD service called Telemundo on Demand, which is carried on most traditional cable and IPTV providers (and like the video-on-demand television services provided by the other U.S. broadcast networks, disallows fast forwarding of accessed content); and via Hulu and iTunes through content deals with those services. Through its ownership by Comcast, the network's programming is also available through Xfinity on Demand. Cataloged episodes of past telenovelas seen on the network are also available on DramaFever, a streaming service that had originally exclusively focused on television shows and movies imported from various Asian countries, through a distribution deal signed on December 13, 2013.

==== Telemundo Now ====
On October 22, 2013, Telemundo launched "Telemundo Now", a multi-platform streaming service (which derived its name from that of a similar TV Everywhere service operated by sister network Bravo, "Bravo Now"), originally encompassing a dedicated streaming portal at TelemundoNow.com and a mobile app for smartphones and tablet computers supporting the iOS and Android platforms. Recent full-length episodes of the network's shows as well as specials are usually made available on Telemundo Now (as well as Telemundo on Demand) the day after their original broadcast to authenticated subscribers of participating pay television providers (such as Comcast, AT&T U-verse, Optimum, Charter Communications, Cox Communications, DirecTV, Dish Network, Mediacom, Suddenlink Communications and Verizon FiOS) using an ISP account via an authenticated user login. The service also offers special features like "Mi Lista," viewers can catalog their favorite shows for fast access and easily resume play to pick up right where they left off.

=== Telemundo HD ===
Telemundo's master feed is transmitted in 1080i high definition, the native resolution format for NBCUniversal's U.S. television properties. However, some Telemundo-affiliated stations transmit the network's programming in 720p HD, while some other affiliates owned by various companies carry the network feed in 480i standard definition either due to technical considerations for affiliates of other major networks that carry Telemundo programming on a digital subchannel or because a primary feed Telemundo affiliate has not yet upgraded their transmission equipment to allow content to be presented in HD. In the case of NBCUniversal-owned WSCV, a 480i standard definition feed of the station is carried on a digital sub-channel with ads targeted at the nearby West Palm Beach market.

As of July 2019, Telemundo's network feed originates from NBCUniversal's corporate office in Centennial, CO (along with the NBC broadcast network), a technical operations facility shared with Comcast. The network utilizes three satellite uplink facilities to distribute its signal. One in Littleton, CO, a short distance from the network's master control operation; a second in Universal City, CA, near the Universal Studios lot; and a third in Englewood Cliffs, NJ at the CNBC building, which also houses master control operations for NBCUniversal's cable properties, including Universo.

Telemundo became the first national Spanish-language broadcaster in the U.S. to provide its prime time programming in high definition through the network and its local stations (nine years after the major English language broadcast networks began their conversion to HD) with the launch of its simulcast feed, Telemundo HD, on April 23, 2009, with that year's edition of the Billboard Latin Music Awards as its inaugural HD broadcast. Concurrently, Telemundo's owned-and-operated television stations in nine markets (New York City, Los Angeles, Chicago, Dallas-Fort Worth, San Francisco, Houston, Miami, Las Vegas, and San Juan) became the first to begin broadcasting the network's programming in HD; the remaining O&Os upgraded their digital signals to allow the transmission of high definition content over the next twelve months, while its affiliated stations gradually followed suit over a four-year period. The network's scripted prime time telenovelas became the first regularly scheduled Telemundo shows to upgrade to the format, beginning with Mas Sabe El Diablo ("Falling Angel"), which premiered in September 2009.

All of the network's first-run entertainment and sports programming, as well as specials and select acquired programs, have been presented in HD since 2012 (with the current exception of archived programs that were made prior to 2009 – such as dubbed versions of Criss Angel Mindfreak and World's Most Amazing Videos ("Videos Más Asombrosos del Mundo") – and were originally produced in 4:3 standard definition, as well as most older Mexican-produced feature films). The weekend morning MiTelemundo E/I block has also been broadcast in HD since its debut in July 2012.

As of September 1, 2018, Telemundo has converted its presentation to a 16:9 presentation. Al Rojo Vivo became the first program to be presented in a 16:9 format, beginning Telemundo's transition to such presentation.

== Controversies ==
=== SAG-AFTRA ===
On February 9, 2016, NBC Universal, Telemundo's parent company, faced claims by SAG-AFTRA of operating under a double standard between its Spanish-language and English-language talent at NBC and Telemundo. In their response, the network released a statement claiming they are "committed to making Telemundo a great place to work for our employees and will continue to invest in them to ensure their salaries and working conditions are competitive with the rest of the broadcasting industry in accordance with market size and station revenues."

A few days later on February 13, 2016, SAG-AFTRA came back and added that Telemundo had been treating its employees like "second-class professionals" given that many actors do not receive basic workplace guarantees that SAG-AFTRA contracts provide, such as fair pay, water breaks, health insurance and residuals. At that time, Telemundo president Luis Silberwasser responded saying that SAG-AFTRA asked for recognition of the union as the bargaining agent for employees — rather than seeking a vote by employees. However, SAG-AFTRA claimed that intimidation tactics had been taking place within the network to keep employees from unionizing and that they believe "there is no such thing as a 'fair vote' when workers are afraid for their careers and livelihoods, and live with the fear of retaliation if they are seen as actively wanting to unionize. SAG-AFTRA wants to ensure full protection for workplace democracy and performers' rights to choose through a truly fair process."

In August 2016, Telemundo once again found itself up against the union when the network refused to air an ad placed by SAG-AFTRA detailing the unfair wage gap and lack of benefits Telemundo employees face as opposed to unionized performers at NBCUniversal. The ad was set to air during the network's premiere people's choice awards Premios Tu Mundo but was never placed into rotation. A Telemundo spokesperson responded saying, "After legal review, we have concluded the ad did not pass legal standards for issue-based advertisement." Meanwhile, other Spanish-language networks such as MegaTV and Estrella TV aired the ad nationwide.

SAG-AFTRA continued to stand its ground, stating that "Telemundo's decision to censor 30 seconds of truthful commentary about its working conditions shows just how averse it is to having a transparent discussion about its refusal to fairly compensate Spanish-speaking performers."

On July 12, 2018, SAG-AFTRA announced it had reached a first-ever tentative agreement with Telemundo Television Studios covering Spanish-language television performers, after fifteen months of negotiations.

Key elements of the three-year deal include:

- Contributions to and participation in the SAG-AFTRA Health Plan and SAG–Producers Pension Plan for the first time
- Residuals for both foreign and domestic exploitation and streaming platforms, based on a percentage of Telemundo's gross receipts
- First ever guaranteed minimum rates for all covered performer categories (including actors, stunt performers, singers and dancers).
- Annual increases in all newly-established minimums between 1–2% per year
- Newly established working conditions and safety protections, including:
  - Minimum rest period between calls of 10 hours
  - Requirement for qualified personnel to coordinate stunts
  - Provisions regarding protection of minors
  - Overtime, holiday pay, and per diem when on location

The agreement was renewed in 2021, including an increase in overnight rest periods from 10 to 11 hours, except for on-location work; additional language tackling sexual harassment and audition safety; and an increase in the current health and pension plan contribution rate by 0.5 percent once the contract ends.

=== 2016 presidential election ===
On May 28, 2016, filmmaker Andrew Marcus caught a cameraman from Telemundo filming a #NeverTrump protest in San Diego. According to the filmmaker, the protest was staged. L. Brent Bozell III, the president of Media Research Center responded by demanding Telemundo apologize to Donald Trump and to fire the crew involved with the incident. Meanwhile, Ken Oliver-Méndez, the director of MRC Latino, described the incident as a "self-inflicted wound on Telemundo's credibility." Telemundo responded to Oliver-Méndez by claiming that "the integrity of the broadcast was not compromised since the material was not used by the Network news team." Telemundo also claimed that the network is "known for its balance and accuracy," and that it "did not, nor would it ask any full-time or temporary worker to stage events."

== International broadcasts ==
=== Mexico ===
Telemundo programming is available in Mexico through affiliates in markets located within proximity to the Mexico–United States border (such as owned-and-operated stations KHRR/Tucson, Arizona, KUAN/San Diego, KTLM/Rio Grande City, and KTDO/El Paso and other afiflates; KESE-LD-KECY-DT4/Yuma, and KGNS-DT3/Laredo), whose signals are readily receivable over-the-air in border areas of northern Mexico.

On March 18, 2008, Grupo Televisa and NBC Universal announced a ten-year multiplatform agreement that would allow 1,000 hours of Telemundo programming, including news; entertainment; specials and sports, to be broadcast over both Televisa's free-to-air channels, as well as its co-owned cable provider SKY México starting that April. The deal also included plans to launch a Telemundo channel that would be operated as a joint venture between both companies; the Mexican cable-satellite version of the network launched in August 2009. NBC Universal had considered launching a Mexican version of Telemundo as early as 2005, which led to a legal battle between it and TV Azteca over allegations that Azteca "engaged in the wrongful use of force" to shut down production of the Telemundo-produced reality singing competition series Quinceañera: Mamá Quiero Ser Artista ("Sweet 15: Mom, I Want to Be an Artist") in Mexico and a news story featured on an Azteca news program that accused then-NBC Universal parent General Electric and Grupo Casa Saba of fraud and corporate corruption with the intent to prevent the approval of a license application by Telemundo and Grupo Xtra to operate a television network in Mexico.

== See also ==
- Univision
- List of Spanish-language television networks in the United States
- List of United States television networks
