= Emilio Romano =

Mexican-American businessman

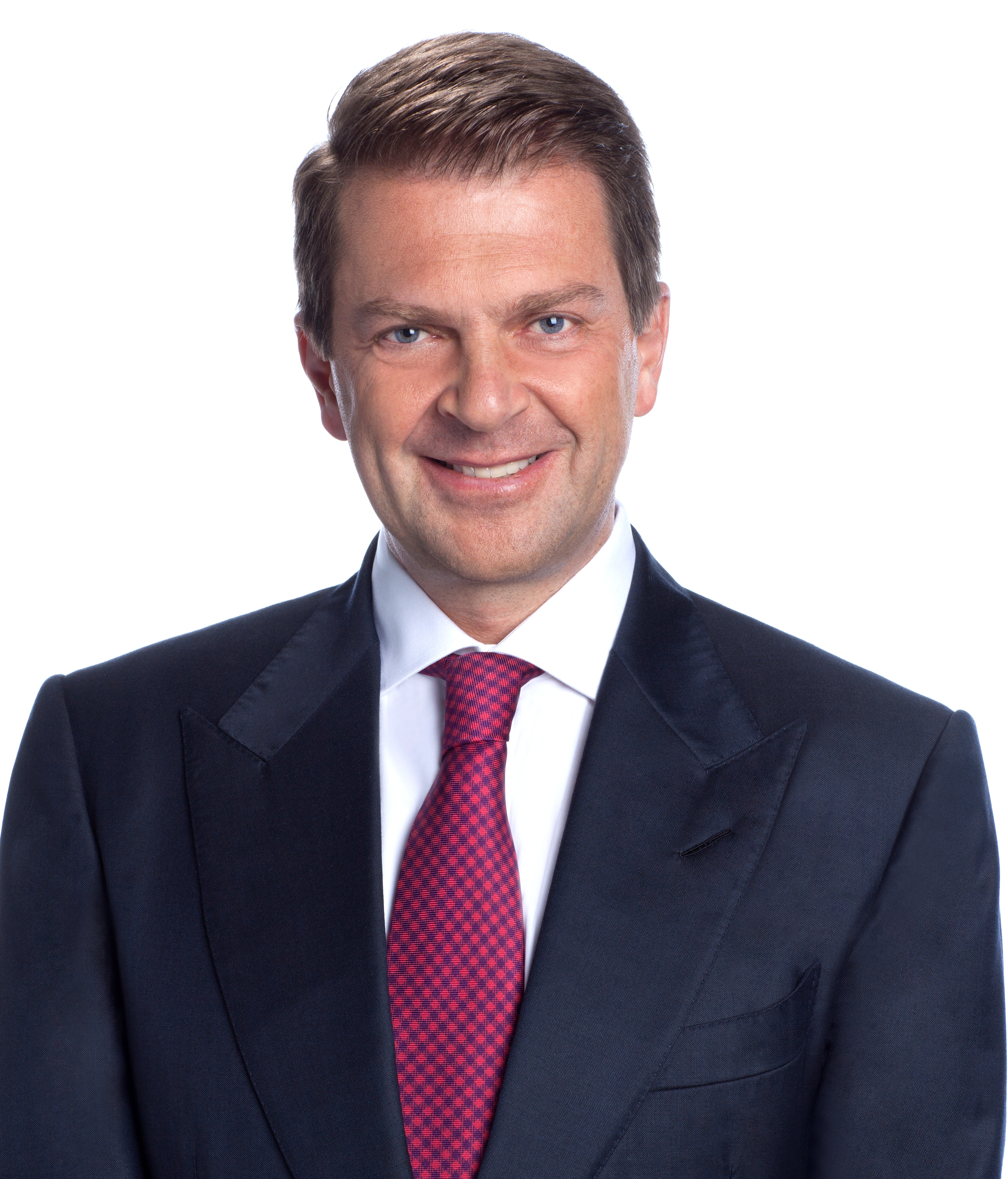
- Born: Emilio Romano; Mexico City, Mexico
- Education: Law Degree, Escuela Libre de Derecho
- Occupation: Country executive of Mexico
- Employer: Bank of America Merrill Lynch (2014-present)
- Spouse: Alisa Drijanski
- Relatives: Pati Jinich (sister-in-law)

Emilio Romano is a businessman and attorney. He is Managing Director of Bank of America Merrill Lynch Mexico. He joins the financial firm from Telemundo, where he served as President since 2011. Prior to this, Romano was president and CEO of Grupo Puerta Alameda, a real estate development and investment company, as well as CEO of Grupo Mexicana de Aviación. He also served in several roles in the Mexican Ministry of Finance, including General Director of Tax Policy and Federal Fiscal Attorney.

== Early life and education ==
Born in Mexico City, Romano holds a law degree and graduated cum laude from the Escuela Libre de Derecho. Additionally, he received a diploma in International Law at the City of London Polytechnic in London, UK.

== Career ==
Romano's diverse career includes senior leadership roles within the media, aviation and digital industries, where he has held a wide range of positions over the past two decades, from entrepreneurial start-ups to the head of large scale business operations.

At the start of his career, Romano worked for the Mexican Ministry of Finance in several positions, including Federal Fiscal Attorney and General Director of Revenue Policy. He also was the chief negotiator for over fifty customs and tax treaties, in addition to customs and tax affairs involving NAFTA.

In the 1990s, Romano served as Grupo Televisa’s Director of Mergers and Acquisitions, before being named Vice President of International Operations, where he supervised over 500 international employees. Romano then went on to co-manage Cablevisiόn, the largest cable network in Mexico.

Romano was a member of the Board of Directors for Univision Communications between 1995 and 1998, where he was responsible for leading numerous high-profile transactions, including the sale of PanAmSat to Hughes Electronics; the formation of Via Digital DTH venture for the Iberian Peninsula; and the Sky Latin America joint venture with The News Corporation, Organizacoes Globo and TCI.

Romano co-founded Border Group, LLC in 2001, where he served as an advisor to multiple media and entertainment companies. Additionally, he was a member of the Board of Directors for Claxson Interactive, a multimedia company offering branded entertainment content for Portuguese and Spanish speakers.

Between 2004 and 2007, Romano was the CEO of Grupo Mexicana de Aviaciόn. His responsibilities there included overseeing the airline’s largest financial restructuring in its 87-year history, engineering the sale of Mexicana de Aviaciόn to a Mexican investor group and organizing the launch of Click Mexicana, the first low-cost carrier in Mexico.

As the President of Telemundo Media, he supervised Telemundo’s digital media group, Telemundo International, the Emmy Award-winning news and sports divisions, and the network’s sales and marketing units. Additionally, Romano oversees mun2, which is the fastest developing lifestyle cable network for young bicultural Latinos. Since joining the company in October 2011, Romano has led the network through the first rebrand in over a decade and has successfully increased ad revenue, distribution, digital content and original productions, strengthening Telemundo’s position as the #1 producer of Spanish-language prime time content. In 2012, Romano was recognized as one of the Imagen Foundation’s Most Powerful & Influential Latinos in Entertainment and was chosen as a member of the 2012 CableFAX 100. Most recently, Romano was honored with the “Network Executive” award during the Multiethnic TV Leadership Awards presented by Broadcasting & Cable and Multichannel News.

== Personal life ==
He is the President of IATA’s International Airline Training Fund Council and was on the Board of Directors for Tam Linhas Aereas (NYSE: TAM). Romano lives with his wife and two daughters (Margot and Laura) in Mexico. He is married to Alisa Drijanski, a chef and breadmaker who is also the sister of celebrity chef Pati Jinich.
