= Saul Steinberg (businessman) =

American businessman and financier (1939–2012)

- Born: Saul Phillip Steinberg; August 13, 1939; New York City, U.S.
- Died: December 7, 2012 (aged 73); New York City, U.S.
- Education: Wharton School
- Occupations: Founder of Leasco; CEO of Reliance Insurance Company
- Spouses: Barbara Herzog (m. 1957; div. 1974) Laura Sconocchia Fisher (m. 1974, divorced) Gayfryd McNabb MacLean Johnson (m. 1983)
- Children: 6
- Relatives: Maria Bartiromo (daughter in-law); Liz Lange (niece)

Saul Phillip Steinberg (August 13, 1939 – December 7, 2012) was an American businessman and financier. He became a millionaire before his 30th birthday and a billionaire before his 40th birthday. He started a computer leasing company (Leasco), which he used in an audacious and successful takeover of the much larger Reliance Insurance Company in 1968. He was best known for his unsuccessful attempts to take over Chemical Bank in 1969 and Walt Disney Productions in 1984.

== Early life ==
Steinberg was born to a Jewish family on August 13, 1939, and grew up in Brooklyn, New York, the son of Julius and Anne Cohen Steinberg. He had one brother, Robert Steinberg, and two sisters, Roni Sokoloff and Lynda Jurist. Steinberg finished a degree from the Wharton School in Philadelphia. He was listed as a member of the class of 1959, but some accounts have said that he graduated in two years at age 18.

== Career ==
=== Business career ===
In 1961, at the age 22, Steinberg founded Leasco Data Processing Equipment Corporation, a computer leasing company that leased IBM computers. While at Wharton, Steinberg had written a paper about IBM Corp., and he had learned that IBM was charging premium prices to lease its computers. Steinberg discovered that he could offer computer leases that would undercut IBM's prices and still obtain bank financing for the entire purchase price of the computers by using the signed leases as collateral with lenders. Leasco grew rapidly, and in 1965, it went public.

Leasco bid to acquire Reliance Insurance Company, a Philadelphia insurance company ten times the size of Leasco. Reliance had been in business 150 years, having been established in 1817 to provide fire insurance. It was managed conservatively. Insurance companies have much capital, which is just what computer leasing companies need. Steinberg offered the Reliance shareholders a combination of convertible subordinated debentures and common stock warrants (rather than cash). Reliance management resisted but eventually capitulated, and Leasco was successful in assuming control of Reliance in 1968. Steinberg was 29 when he took over Reliance.

In 1969, Steinberg attempted to take over Chemical Bank, then one of the nation's largest financial institutions. The attempt failed.

Steinberg’s advisors N. M. Rothschild & Sons helped Leasco successfully took over Pergamon Press from British businessman Robert Maxwell. The two initially got along, but the relationship quickly soured, and Steinberg was able to rally British investors to oust Maxwell from his position. However, Maxwell bought Pergamon back with borrowed funds in 1974.

Steinberg became the CEO of Reliance, and he and his brother were the senior managers of Reliance for the next thirty years. Steinberg took on large amounts of debt during the junk bond era and grew, apparently by underpricing its insurance policies. The company paid out dividends to the shareholders, including the Steinberg family members as major shareholders, and paid Saul Steinberg large sums in compensation.

At Reliance, Steinberg hired dealmaker Henry Silverman, who later became the CEO of HFS Inc. and later Cendant Corp. In 1986, while Silverman was at Reliance, he and Steinberg were involved with television executive Joseph Wallach in acquiring Spanish language television stations and creating the Spanish-language media company Telemundo.

In 1995, Steinberg had a serious stroke. He was forced to step back from management of Reliance. The leverage, low pricing on insurance policies led Reliance to financial problems. Management attempted to sell the company. Reliance Group negotiated a transaction to be sold to Leucadia National in 2000 for stock and the assumption of debt. However, this transaction fell apart in July 2000.

Reliance filed for bankruptcy in 2001 and entered into a long process of liquidation. Steinberg was forced to sell his extensive art collection along with his 17,000 square-foot, 34-room duplex apartment at 740 Park Avenue in Manhattan, which was bought for "slightly above or below $30 million" in 2000 by Stephen A. Schwarzman of the Blackstone Group.

=== Involvement with Wharton ===
Steinberg was a major benefactor of the Wharton School at the University of Pennsylvania. He served as chairman of Wharton's Board of Overseers for over 15 years and continued as a member of the board until his death. The Steinberg name is highly visible at Wharton, most notably attached to Steinberg-Dietrich Hall, which served as the main undergraduate building, containing classrooms, lounges, computer labs, and departmental offices. The Steinberg Conference Center serves as home to the Executive Education Center and the Aresty Institute of Executive Education. Additionally, Steinberg endowed the Saul P. Steinberg Professor of Management chair.

=== Charity and advocacy ===
In 2000, Steinberg donated The Death of Adonis (1614) by Peter Paul Rubens to the Israel Museum in Jerusalem.

== Personal life ==
- Steinberg met his first wife Barbara Herzog in high school; they had three children and divorced in 1974:
  - Jonathan ("Jono") married CNBC host Maria Bartiromo in 1999. Jono is the CEO of ETF company WisdomTree. (Bartiromo later moved to the Fox Business Network.)
  - Laura married Loews Hotels executive Jonathan Tisch in 1988; they later divorced. In 2001, she married Stafford Broumand, a plastic surgeon.
  - Nicholas owns comic-book stores in Philadelphia.
- Steinberg divorced his first wife after he met Italian-American Laura Bordoni Sconocchia Fisher in 1974; Laura converted to Judaism before their marriage. They had a son, Julian, and later divorced.
- In 1983, Steinberg married Canadian-born, Gayfryd (McNabb MacLean Johnson) Steinberg, a twice divorced Louisiana businesswoman who once ran her own steel-pipe business. Gayfryd also converted to Judaism before their marriage. Steinberg adopted Gayfryd's son, Rayne, from a previous marriage and they also had a daughter, Holden together. Gayfryd is a trustee of the New York Public Library.

In 1989, Steinberg hosted an opulent 50th birthday party for himself that included live models depicting his favorite Renaissance paintings.

Steinberg's brother Robert worked as a senior executive at Reliance, helping Steinberg run the company for many years. In 1999, as Reliance encountered severe financial problems, Saul Steinberg fired his brother, and the brothers became estranged from one another. In 2000, Steinberg's mother Anne Steinberg sued Saul for $5 million that she says he borrowed from her in 1997 and promised to repay in December 1999. She also sued her other son Robert for $1.5 million, a debt that was due in December.

Steinberg had a stroke in 1995.

In 2000 Steinberg sold his apartment at 740 Park Avenue in Manhattan to financier Stephen A. Schwarzman of The Blackstone Group for a reported $37 million. The apartment had once belonged to John D. Rockefeller Jr.

Steinberg died on December 7, 2012 at the age of 73 on the same day as his mother Anne Steinberg.
