= Reliance Insurance Company =

American insurance company

Reliance Insurance Co.
- Type: Insurance company (main company)
- Industry: Insurance
- Founder: Group of fire and hose companies
- Headquarters: Philadelphia, Pennsylvania, U.S., USA
- Key people: Saul Phillip Steinberg (Former Chairman & CEO); Robert Steinberg
- Services: Insurance
- Number of employees: About 200 (2009)
- Subsidiaries: See Companies below

Reliance Insurance Company, now officially known as "Reliance Insurance Company [in Liquidation]," was founded in Philadelphia in 1817 and has undergone numerous corporate makeovers in the intervening years. Since October 3, 2001, the company has been in liquidation. As of 2020, Reliance was still in liquidation.

== History ==
=== 19th century ===
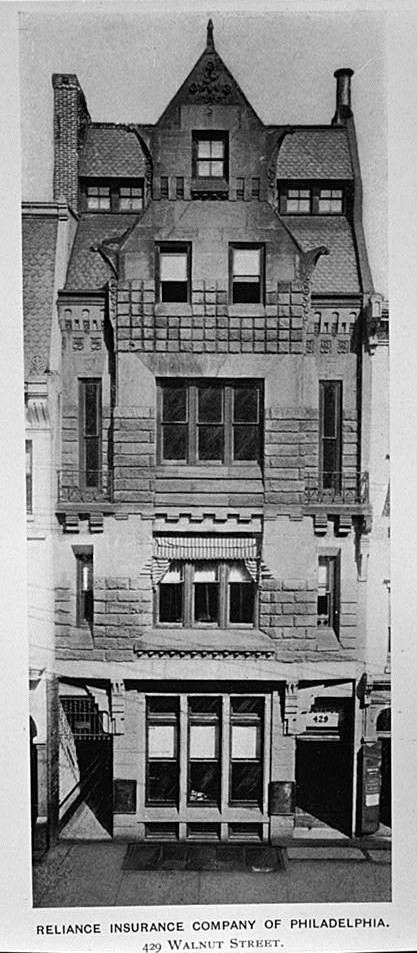
Reliance Insurance Company of Philadelphia (1881–82, demolished 1960).

Reliance was founded in 1817, officially incorporating in 1820, as the Fire Association of Philadelphia, organized by 5 hose and 11 engine fire companies. Upon inception, Reliance became the nation's first successful association of volunteer fire departments, which beforehand had been independent of one another and often engaged in inefficient competition, which at times extended to the destruction of rivals' equipment and the assault of rival firefighters. In addition to underwriting fire insurance, the association served as mediator between its member engine and hose companies to resolve the problems of the past. The association's first policy was bought by Samuel Bleight for his three-story building. One lasting symbol of the company adopted at the outset was the fire mark featuring a fireplug with a coiling hose and the initials F.A. on both sides.

The association was granted a charter by the governor of Pennsylvania on March 27, 1820, and wrote 29 policies that year. By 1832 the association wrote 583 policies and by 1844 it had 44 member companies. In 1850, it had a $100,000 surplus, all of which was lost by the Great Fire of Philadelphia that year. The trustees, however, paid all resulting claims, which brought them goodwill and led to further expansion. In 1871, the city of Philadelphia created its own fire department. In response, the trustees chose to continue as a stock company under a new charter, whereby they became solely an insurance company and began writing policies outside of Philadelphia.

=== 20th century ===
The business continued to grow over the ensuing decades with the development of a countrywide field of agents, expanded forms of coverage including automobile insurance, and the formation of various subsidiaries, one of which was Reliance Insurance Company founded in the 1920s.

In 1950, the association merged its subsidiaries into the parent company, and on January 1, 1958, The Fire Association of Philadelphia officially changed its name to Reliance Insurance Company. The company's growth continued through acquisition and the establishment of subsidiaries. The General Casualty Company of Wisconsin was bought in 1956 and United Pacific Insurance Company in May 1967, providing the company with a solid presence in the Midwest and West respectively. Eureka Insurance Company was started in 1959. Its name was changed to Planet Insurance Company in 1963, and beginning in 1976, wrote Reliance's commercial mass-marketing business.

In 1968, the brokerage firm of Carter, Berlind & Weill ("Carter Berlind") saw the potential in acquiring an insurance company, many of which had strong balance sheets and excess surplus, which could be used for other things outside of the insurance business. They examined several insurance companies and eventually targeted Reliance as the most attractive candidate because of its strong financial position and because a large percentage of the company's stock was owned by Carter Berlind's institutional clients thus making them prime for a takeover. After having approached and having been rejected by many other financiers, such as Laurence Tisch, Carter Berlind presented the idea of selling Reliance to Saul Phillip Steinberg.

Steinberg was born August 1939 in Brooklyn, New York City, and received a Bachelor of Science degree in Economics from the Wharton School of Finance at the University of Pennsylvania in 1959. In 1961, at the age 22, he founded Leasco Data Processing Equipment Corporation, a small office data-processing equipment firm that leased IBM computers. The company grew rapidly, expanded its capabilities, and in 1965 went public. As Leasco grew, Steinberg sought to diversify the company. In 1968 Leasco bought 91% of Reliance Insurance Company and its subsidiaries (Steinberg bought the balance of the company in the winter of 1981). A year later in 1969 Steinberg attempted to take over the $9 billion Chemical Bank, then one of the nation's largest financial institutions. The attempt failed and earned Steinberg the enmity of the New York financial community and a reputation for brashness. Mr. Steinberg remarked at the time, "I always knew there was an establishment; I just thought I was part of it." Fifteen years later Steinberg would make another legendary run at another fabled American institution, The Walt Disney Co. He failed in this bid too, but forced Disney to pay him $60 million in "greenmail" for his shares.

In the early 1970s, under the direction of Steinberg, Reliance and its corporate parent Leasco underwent significant changes in structure and operation. A holding company called Reliance Group Holdings was formed, which through an intermediate holding company owned Reliance and its subsidiaries and sister companies. In 1973 Leasco changed its name to Reliance Group, Inc., to reflect a corporate strategy away from computers services toward financial services and notably insurance-related ones. New insurance subsidiaries were spawned to handle the company's increasing expansion into selected specialty lines, including Commonwealth Land Title Insurance Company (c. 1976), Reliance Insurance Company of New York (1978), Reliance Lloyds (1980). In the early 1980s, the expansion included the incorporation of several new life insurance companies. Throughout this period of expansion and diversification, Reliance Insurance Company continued to handle most of the standard lines of insurance with which most people are familiar, including personal automobile and homeowners.

In 1981, Steinberg, still chairman of the board and chief executive officer, acquired all outstanding shares of Reliance Group, Inc. Thus the company was now privately owned by Steinberg and his family. In 1985, Steinberg hired investment banker Stephen M. Peck as chief investment officer. In 1986, however, the company again went public selling about 20% of its stock with Steinberg and his family retaining the rest.

The company's stock value plummeted following the stock market crash of 1987 and its underwriting results suffered in the late 1980s, in large part due to claims arising from hurricanes and the 1989 San Francisco earthquake. All the while, however, Reliance's growth strategy continued, expanding into ever more diversified insurance markets, including surety and reinsurance. Beyond the expansion of its insurance markets, Reliance Group developed other areas of business; among which, Reliance Development Group, Inc. handled real estate operations, and Reliance Consulting Group provided consulting services for energy, environment, and natural resources. As the company expanded in one area through start-up and acquisition, it meanwhile sold off other interests. In 1989 the company's sale of Days Corporation, owner of the Days Inn hotel chain, nearly tripling its initial 1984 investment.

Steinberg suffered a stroke in 1995. Active control of his financial empire was assumed by his brother, Robert Steinberg. Changes were instituted ostensibly toward making Reliance more focused on insurance, and for a while, it looked as if the company was prospering. Many investors who had long ago grown weary of Saul Steinberg were endorsing the company. RGH stock reached a record high. The company reported in its 1998 annual financial statement, filed in March 1999, a $1.7 billion statutory surplus, its largest in history, and a profit for that year of $585 million. Within less than three years, however, the Commonwealth Court of Pennsylvania would issue a court order placing Reliance into liquidation.

=== 21st century ===
The company lost $177 million in net income in 1999 and another $198 million in 2000. In early 2000. Reliance agreed to be acquired by Leucadia National for stock that amounted to only $359 million. The price represented a market capitalization loss of $1.941 billion since mid-1998 when Reliance's market value reached a high of $2.3 billion. The deal, however, fell through when Leucadia National backed out because of concerns over Reliance's financial health.

Pennsylvania insurance regulators sought to salvage the company in 2001, but by October 3 of that year, following the undermining of the financial markets in the wake of the terrorist attacks of September 11, 2001, Pennsylvania's insurance commissioner, Diane Koken, petitioned to have the company liquidated. It was the largest insurer liquidation in U.S. history according to the Insurance Information Institute.

The speed and size of Reliance's collapse in turn caused uncertainty about the foremost insurance rating agencies, such as A.M. Best Co., who until June 2000 rated Reliance's financial strength as an A− (excellent), and Standard & Poor's, who had assigned the insurer an A (strong) rating. The rating agencies, however, played an integral role in the company's collapse. Once A.M. Best downgraded Reliance's rating in June 2000, due in part to the substantial debt of the parent company, Reliance Group Holdings, Inc., Reliance's ability to retain and attract business was dealt a fateful blow. Another factor causing the sudden downfall was a complicated reinsurance pool of workers compensation policies, dubbed Unicover, that was a very costly failure. Unicover, however, was only one example of the corporate mentality and risk-taking philosophy that ultimately caused the company's demise. In its eagerness to expand and grow, policies were written too cheaply; excessive dividends were paid to stockholders (largely the Steinbergs themselves); and the company was mismanaged. And as a result it failed.

Following the October 3, 2001 court order placing the company in liquidation, the Pennsylvania Insurance Department took over control of the estate of Reliance, which began a long, complicated, and ongoing process of determining the full extent of the company's liabilities and distribution of all of its assets. In the meantime, legal actions were instituted against the company's former officers and directors for breach of their fiduciary duties and negligence leading to the company's downfall. The actions were precedent-setting in nature and resulted in a better understanding of what had contributed to Reliance's problems, as well as approximately $100 million in settlements to offset the company's liabilities.

The order of liquidation triggered the established statutory provisions of various state insurance guaranty funds, who took over the handling of many of the claims against the company's policies. Whether a state's guaranty association will assume responsibility for a given claim depends on several factors, notably whether the insurance company was licensed to do business in the state and whether there exists other insurance for the loss. The amount of assets of the policyholder, the date the claim is reported, and other variables also play a role in determining whether a guaranty fund will accept the claim. Claims payments made by a guaranty association are assessed against insurers licensed to do business in the state, who will ultimately pass along the cost to their policyholders. By almost any measurement, Reliance was the largest insurance liquidation in history:

Year	Insolvent company	Payments
2001	Reliance Insurance Company	$2,265,845,612
2002	Legion Insurance Company	$1,272,694,066
2000	California Compensation Insurance Company	$1,049,745,420
2000	Fremont Indemnity Insurance Company	$843,405,746
2001	PHICO Insurance Company	$699,420,144

== Companies ==
Reliance Insurance Company became a subsidiary of Leasco in 1968 and of Reliance Group in 1973 when Leasco changed its name. In addition to Reliance Insurance Company, Reliance Group at various times owned the following other corporations:

- Cananwill
- Commonwealth Land Title Insurance Company
- Commonwealth Mortgage Assurance Company
- Commonwealth Relocation Services, Inc.
- General Casualty Companies
- Herbert W. Davis & Company
- RCG International, Inc.
- RCG/Hagler Bailly
- RCG/Moody-Tottrup
- RCG/Personnel Sciences
- RCG/Vectron
- Reliance Development Group, Inc.
- Reliance Direct Insurance Company
- Reliance National Insurance Company
- Reliance Reinsurance Corporation
- Reliance Standard Life Insurance Company
- Reliance Surety Company
- Telemundo Group, Inc.
- Transamerica Title Insurance Company
- United Pacific Financial Services
- United Pacific Life Insurance Company
- United Pacific Reliance Life Insurance Company of New York
- Werner International, Inc.

== Advertising and Marketing Campaigns ==
Reliance's company slogan for many years was "Quality is our policy."

The company engaged in relatively little advertising directed at the general public, since most of its business was placed through independent insurance agents and brokers. As a consequence the company was not as widely known as some other insurers of comparable size who undertook more mass marketing. One Reliance ad, however, that ran in trade publications in the 1970s, was so outright sexist by today's standards as to be humorous in retrospect. This full-page ad, aimed at insurance agents, featured the catch phrase, "Have we got a girl for you!" and depicts an attractive young female, who is identified as "The Claim Service Representative." The ad then directs the reader to various parts of the woman's anatomy and asserts how it will aid the agent in handling claims. The caption to the line drawn to woman's forehead reads, "Brains. Our girls are a lot more than just a pretty face. They're all well educated." The caption to the line drawn to her ankle reads, "Well-turned ankle. No use to you, but it's pretty to look at." The ad goes on to encourage the targeted insurance agent to "Think about it, if you had an accident, wouldn't you appreciate a chat with a pretty girl? Of course you would." What the ad doesn't say but which was not only true of Reliance but most every insurer at the time, their employees in the often hectic and stressful work environment of handling insurance claims were largely staffed by young women. This not only gave the agent "an extra pair" of hands but also kept salary costs comparatively low.

== CEOs ==
CEO	Years served
	1817–10
A. Addison Robert	? – ?

(partial listing)
