= List of television stations in New Mexico =

This is a list of broadcast television stations that are licensed in the U.S. state of New Mexico.

== Full-power ==
- Stations are arranged by media market served and channel position.

Full-power television stations in New Mexico
Media market	Station	Channel	Primary affiliation(s)	Notes	Refs
Albuquerque–Santa Fe	KASA-TV	2	Telemundo		
Albuquerque–Santa Fe	KOB	4	NBC		
Albuquerque–Santa Fe	KNME-TV	5	PBS		
Albuquerque–Santa Fe	KOAT-TV	7	ABC, CBS on 7.4		
Albuquerque–Santa Fe	KNMD-TV	9	PBS		
Albuquerque–Santa Fe	KCHF	11	Religious independent		
Albuquerque–Santa Fe	KRQE	13	Fox, Independent on 13.2		
Albuquerque–Santa Fe	KLUZ-TV	14	Univision		
Albuquerque–Santa Fe	KWBQ	19	The CW		
Albuquerque–Santa Fe	KNAT-TV	23	TBN		
Albuquerque–Santa Fe	KAZQ	32	Religious independent		
Albuquerque–Santa Fe	KTFQ-TV	41	UniMás		
Albuquerque–Santa Fe	KASY-TV	50	MyNetworkTV		
Clovis	KENW	3	PBS	(Note: Licensed to Portales, New Mexico.)	
Clovis	KVIH-TV	12	ABC	(Note: Satellite of KVII-TV.)	
Farmington	KOBF	12	NBC	(Note: Satellite of KOB.)	
Hobbs	KUPT	29	TeleXitos, Telemundo on 2.1	(Note: Licensed to Hobbs, New Mexico.) (Note: Satellite of KUPT-LD.)	
Roswell–Carlsbad	KOBR	8	NBC		
Roswell–Carlsbad	KBIM-TV	10	CBS, Fox on 10.2	(Note: Satellite of KRQE.)	
Roswell–Carlsbad	KKAC	19	Story Television		
Roswell–Carlsbad	KRWB-TV	21	The CW, MyNetworkTV on 21.2	(Note: Satellite of KWBQ.)	
Roswell–Carlsbad	KTEL-TV	33	Cozi TV, Telemundo on 25.4	(Note: Satellite of KTEL-CD.)	
Roswell–Carlsbad	KRPV-DT	27	God's Learning Channel		
Truth or Consequences	KKAB	12	WEST		
~El Paso, TX	KRWG-TV	22	PBS	(Note: Licensed to Las Cruces, New Mexico.)	
~El Paso, TX	KTDO	48	Telemundo		

== Low-power ==
Low-power television stations in New Mexico
Media market	Station	Channel	Network	Notes	Refs
Alamogordo	K14QG-D	14	Religious independent		
Alamogordo	K07AAL-D	34	[Blank]	(Note: Licensed to Orogrande, New Mexico.)	
Albuquerque–Santa Fe	KUPT-LD	16	Movies!		
Albuquerque–Santa Fe	KMNQ-LD	20	Various		
Albuquerque–Santa Fe	KYNM-CD	21	Various		
Albuquerque–Santa Fe	KAOE-LD	22	Shop LC		
Albuquerque–Santa Fe	KQDF-LP	25	Various		
Albuquerque–Santa Fe	KTVS-LD	36	Religious independent		
Albuquerque–Santa Fe	K34PZ-D	38	Daystar		
Albuquerque–Santa Fe	KRTN-LD	39	Cozi TV		
Albuquerque–Santa Fe	KWPL-LD	45	Various		
Albuquerque–Santa Fe	KTEL-CD	47	Telemundo		
Farmington	K32JT-D	32	Silent		
Farmington	K21MV-D	46	Silent		
Hobbs	K34KZ-D	45	3ABN		
Socorro	K19NF-D	19	Silent		
Taos	KCEI-LD	18	Silent		
Alamogordo	K06QI-D	6	K14QG-D		
Alamogordo	KVBA-LD	19	K14QG-D		

== Translators ==
Television station translators in New Mexico
Media market	Station	Channel	Translating	Notes	Refs
Alamogordo	K27HP-D	2	KASA-TV		
Alamogordo	K18LM-D	3	KENW	(Note: Licensed to Mud Canyon, New Mexico.)	
Alamogordo	KKNJ-LP	4	KDBC-TV		
Alamogordo	K21LR-D	7	KVIA-TV		
Alamogordo	K34CR	7	KOAT-TV		
Alamogordo	K31GJ-D	8	KOBR		
Alamogordo	K32OE-D	10	KBIM-TV		
Alamogordo	K26MV-D	10	KENW	(Note: Licensed to Soldier Canyon, New Mexico.)	
Alamogordo	K24CT	19	KWBQ		
Alamogordo	K30QI-D	22	KRWG-TV		
Alamogordo	K28HB	50	KASY-TV		
Albuquerque–Santa Fe	K31NB-D	2	KASA-TV		
Albuquerque–Santa Fe	K21OH-D	4	KOB	(Note: Licensed to Datil, New Mexico.)	
Albuquerque–Santa Fe	K22FN-D	5	KNME-TV	(Note: Licensed to White Oaks, New Mexico.)	
Albuquerque–Santa Fe	K23OO-D	5	KNME-TV	(Note: Licensed to Moon Ranch, New Mexico.)	
Capulin	K33GC-D	5	KNME-TV		
Carlsbad	K17MN-D	2	KASA-TV		
Carlsbad	K23MV-D	3	KENW		
Carlsbad	K18NX-D	7	KOAT-TV		
Carlsbad	K33NX-D	8	KOBR		
Clovis	K21IM-D	3	KENW	(Note: Licensed to Fort Sumner, New Mexico.)	
Clovis	K27NL-D	4	KAMR-TV		
Clovis	K16EX-D	8	KOBR		
Clovis	K20KT-D	10	KBIM-TV	(Note: Licensed to Dora, New Mexico.)	
Clovis	K24MW-D	10	KBIM-TV		
Clovis	K29HB-D	10	KFDA-TV		
Clovis	K19LP-D	12	KVIH-TV		
Clovis	K28PV-D	14	KCIT		
Clovis	KZBZ-CD	26	KFDA-TV		
Farmington	K23KL-D	2	KASA-TV		
Farmington	K27ND-D	2	KASA-TV	(Note: Licensed to Aztec, New Mexico.)	
Farmington	K10CG-D	5	KNME-TV		
Farmington	K18LG-D	5	KNME-TV	(Note: Licensed to Shiprock, New Mexico.)	
Farmington	K22NP-D	5	KNME-TV		
Farmington	K22NT-D	5	KNME-TV		
Farmington	K31PM-D	5	KNME-TV		
Farmington	K36PP-D	5	KNME-TV		
Farmington	K29HR-D	6	KREZ-TV		
Farmington	K19CM-D	7	KOAT-TV		
Farmington	K24IV-D	7	KOAT-TV		
Gallup	K18HF-D	2	KASA-TV		
Gallup	K23FE-D	5	KNME-TV		
Gallup	K25QD-D	5	KNME-TV	(Note: Licensed to Tohatchi, New Mexico.)	
Gallup	K33QD-D	5	KNME-TV	(Note: Licensed to Zuni Pueblo, New Mexico.)	
Gallup	K10PW-D	7	KOAT-TV		
Gallup	K16DL-D	12	KOBF		
Gallup	K34PK-D	12	KOBF		
Gallup	K36PV-D	12	KOBF		
Gallup	K19MP-D	13	KRQE		
Gallup	K26OV-D	13	KRQE		
Grants	K36JS-D	4	KOB		
Grants	K33GA-D	5	KNME-TV		
Grants	K11EV-D	7	KOAT-TV		
Grants	K09EP-D	13	KRQE		
Hobbs	K27GL-D	2	KASA-TV		
Hobbs	K24MB-D	3	KENW		
Hobbs	K12NH-D	7	KOAT-TV		
Hobbs	K19KT-D	34	KJTV-TV		
Las Vegas	K20GQ-D	2	KASA-TV		
Las Vegas	K23NN-D	4	KOB		
Las Vegas	K25FI-D	4	KOB	(Note: Licensed to Mora, New Mexico.)	
Las Vegas	K31EO-D	5	KNME-TV		
Las Vegas	K33FL-D	5	KNME-TV		
Las Vegas	K09AI-D	7	KOAT-TV		
Las Vegas	K18LC-D	9	KNMD-TV	(Note: Licensed to Tecolote, New Mexico.)	
Las Vegas	K22EW-D	13	KRQE		
Las Vegas	K30OJ-D	13	KRQE		
Lordsburg	K21OW-D	21	KRWG-TV		
Lordsburg	K25QU-D	22	KRWG-TV	(Note: Licensed to Antelope Wells, New Mexico.)	
Lordsburg	K33QU-D	22	KRWG-TV	(Note: Licensed to Jacks Peak, New Mexico.)	
Northern New Mexico	K09KJ-D	4	KOB	(Note: Licensed to Tierra Amarilla, New Mexico.)	
Northern New Mexico	K15JO-D	5	KNME-TV	(Note: Licensed to Chama, New Mexico.)	
Northern New Mexico	K31HB-D	5	KNME-TV	(Note: Licensed to Galinna, New Mexico.)	
Northern New Mexico	K34HF-D	5	KNME-TV	(Note: Licensed to Cuba, New Mexico.)	
Northern New Mexico	K28ER-D	7	KOAT-TV	(Note: Licensed to Dulce, New Mexico.)	
Northern New Mexico	K36KD-D	7	KOAT-TV		
Northern New Mexico	K30EK-D	12	KOBF		
Northern New Mexico	K22GE-D	13	KREZ-TV		
Raton	K31NZ-D	2	KASA-TV	(Note: Licensed to Eagle Nest, New Mexico.)	
Raton	K18LT-D	4	KOB		
Raton	K26DX-D	4	KOB		
Raton	K30GJ-D	4	KOB	(Note: Licensed to Colfax, New Mexico.)	
Raton	K15FV-D	5	KNME-TV	(Note: Licensed to Red River, New Mexico.)	
Raton	K20CV-D	5	KNME-TV		
Raton	K28GF-D	5	KNME-TV	(Note: Licensed to Cimarron, New Mexico.)	
Raton	K33FK-D	5	KNME-TV	(Note: Licensed to Angel Fire, New Mexico.)	
Raton	K34FQ-D	5	KNME-TV	(Note: Licensed to Roy, New Mexico.)	
Raton	K36FQ-D	5	KNME-TV	(Note: Licensed to Wagon Mound, New Mexico.)	
Raton	K16CH-D	7	KOAT-TV		
Raton	K23JD-D	7	KOAT-TV		
Raton	K12OC-D	7	KOAT-TV		
Raton	K15MF-D	13	KRQE		
Raton	K22MS-D	13	KRQE		
Raton	K24IY-D	28	KSPK-LD		
Roswell	K15FT-D	2	KASA-TV		
Roswell	K29FM-D	3	KENW	(Note: Licensed to Artesia, New Mexico.)	
Roswell	K31GS-D	3	KENW		
Roswell	K13RK-D	7	KOAT-TV		
Roswell	K16LR-D	25	KTEL-TV		
Ruidoso	K28PS-D	2	KASA-TV		
Ruidoso	K35GU-D	3	KENW		
Ruidoso	K31MW-D	7	KOAT-TV		
Ruidoso	K30GM-D	8	KOBR		
Ruidoso	K16BZ-D	10	KBIM-TV		
Santa Rosa	K36DI-D	4	KOB		
Santa Rosa	K30FP-D	5	KNME-TV		
Santa Rosa	K29LN-D	13	KRQE		
Silver City	K15IG-D	2	KASA-TV	(Note: Licensed to Deming, New Mexico.)	
Silver City	K25DI-D	2	KASA-TV		
Silver City	K12QW-D	4	KOB		
Silver City	K32NK-D	4	KOB		
Silver City	K08QP-D	7	KOAT-TV		
Silver City	K22ME-D	7	KOAT-TV		
Silver City	K31KB-D	7	KVIA-TV		
Silver City	K30KU-D	13	KRQE		
Silver City	K35HB-D	13	KRQE		
Silver City	K28LK-D	28	KRWG-TV		
Silver City	K24MX-D	46	KRWG-TV		
Silver City	K29MK-D	49	KRWG-TV		
Socorro	K10MG-D	4	KOB		
Socorro	K15HC-D	5	KNME-TV	(Note: Licensed to Quemado, New Mexico.)	
Socorro	K33PG-D	5	KNME-TV		
Taos	K12OG-D	2	KASA-TV		
Taos	K30KX-D	4	KOB		
Taos	K15HD-D	5	KNME-TV		
Taos	K33OE-D	5	KNME-TV	(Note: Licensed to Penasco, New Mexico.)	
Taos	K36LF-D	7	KOAT-TV		
Taos	K43IA	11	KCHF		
Taos	K21FD-D	13	KRQE		
Thoreau	K31JR-D	5	KNME-TV		
Thoreau	K31OX-D	5	KNME-TV	(Note: Licensed to Ramah, New Mexico.)	
Thoreau	718888	5	KNME-TV	(Note: Licensed to Crownpoint, New Mexico.)	
Thoreau	K15KK-D	7	KOAT-TV	(Note: Licensed to Mount Powell, New Mexico.)	
Thoreau	K30KV-D	7	KOAT-TV		
Thoreau	K20GT-D	12	KOBF	(Note: Licensed to Indian Village, New Mexico.)	
Thoreau	K28GT-D	12	KOBF		
Thoreau	K29KT-D	13	KRQE		
Truth or Consequences	K22JY-D	2	KASA-TV		
Truth or Consequences	K31DR-D	2	KASA-TV	(Note: Licensed to Caballo, New Mexico.)	
Truth or Consequences	K20HA	4	KOB		
Truth or Consequences	K29LC-D	4	KOB		
Truth or Consequences	K16LU-D	7	KOAT-TV		
Truth or Consequences	K25HV-D	13	KRQE		
Truth or Consequences	K35JR-D	13	KRQE	(Note: Licensed to Arrey, New Mexico.)	
Truth or Consequences	K28QE-D	22	KRWG-TV		
Truth or Consequences	K33PE-D	40	KRWG-TV		
Tucumcari	K30HD-D	3	KENW		
Tucumcari	K23OI-D	4	KAMR-TV		
Tucumcari	K35FP	4	KOB		
Tucumcari	K21OF-D	7	KVII-TV		
Tucumcari	K26OJ-D	10	KFDA-TV		
Tucumcari	K15LZ-D	13	KRQE		
Tucumcari	K24NF-D	14	KCIT		
Tucumcari	K25HJ-D	13	KRQE	(Note: Licensed to Hornsby Ranch, New Mexico.)	
Tucumcari	K17FK-D	4	KOB	(Note: Licensed to Montoya and Newkirk, New Mexico.)	
Tucumcari	K28NX-D	7	KOAT-TV		
Tucumcari	K18HR-D	5	KNME-TV	(Note: Licensed to Conchas Dam, New Mexico.)	

== Defunct ==
- KKTO-TV Santa Fe–Albuquerque (1983–1992)
- KGSW-TV Albuquerque (1981–1993)
- KOBG-TV Silver City (2000–2011)
- KOCT Carlsbad (1956–2012)
- KOFT Farmington (2002–2007)
- KOVT Silver City (1987–2012)
