= Channel 18 low-power TV stations in the United States =

The following low-power television stations broadcast on digital or analog channel 18 in the United States:

- K18AD-D in East Wenatchee, etc., Washington
- K18BN-D in Glasgow, Montana
- K18CB-D in Bullhead City, Arizona
- K18CR-D in Circle, etc., Montana
- K18DD-D in Camp Verde, Arizona
- K18DG-D in Alexandria, Minnesota
- K18DL-D in Logan, Utah
- K18DP-D in Lovelock, Nevada
- K18DR-D in Cortez, etc., Colorado
- K18DT-D in Coeur D'Alene, Idaho
- K18EL-D in Newberg/Tigard, Oregon
- K18ET-D in Orderville, Utah
- K18FN-D in Peetz, Colorado
- K18FO-D in Idalia, Colorado
- K18FR-D in Newport, Oregon
- K18FU-D in Rural Beaver County, Utah
- K18GD-D in Redstone, Colorado
- K18GF-D in Little Falls, Minnesota
- K18GG-D in Mina/Luning, Nevada
- K18GM-D in Pleasant Valley, Colorado
- K18GT-D in Ryndon, Nevada
- K18GU-D in Ottumwa, Iowa
- K18GX-D in Juab, Utah
- K18HD-D in Bakersfield, California
- K18HF-D in Gallup, New Mexico
- K18HH-D in The Dalles, Oregon
- K18HQ-D in Sandpoint, Idaho
- K18HR-D in Conchas Dam, New Mexico
- K18HX-D in Hollis, Oklahoma
- K18HZ-D in Navajo Mountain, Utah
- K18IA-D in Oljeto, Utah
- K18IB-D in Mexican Hat, Utah
- K18IM-D in Daggett, California
- K18IP-D in Overton, Nevada
- K18IQ-D in Jacks Cabin, Colorado
- K18IR-D in Olivia, Minnesota
- K18IT-D in Green River, Utah
- K18IU-D in Mayfield, Utah
- K18IV-D in Mount Pleasant, Utah
- K18IZ-D in Grandfield, Oklahoma
- K18JA-D in Pinedale, Wyoming
- K18JD-D in Torrington, Wyoming
- K18JE-D in Broadus, Montana
- K18JG-D in Beowowe, Nevada
- K18JJ-D in Crowheart, Wyoming
- K18JM-D in Northome, Minnesota
- K18JU-D in Utahn, Utah
- K18JX-D in Hoehne, Colorado
- K18KA-D in Ely, Nevada
- K18KC-D in Wendover, Utah
- K18KD-D in Libby, Montana
- K18KG-D in Spencer, Iowa
- K18KH-D in Julesburg, Colorado
- K18KI-D in Baker City, Oregon
- K18KK-D in Columbia, Missouri
- K18KM-D in Conrad, Montana
- K18KO-D in Rural Summit County, Utah
- K18KT-D in Chinook, Montana
- K18LG-D in Shiprock, New Mexico
- K18LH-D in Lewiston, Idaho
- K18LJ-D in Dunsmuir, etc., California
- K18LL-D in Eads, etc., Colorado
- K18LM-D in Mud Canyon, New Mexico
- K18LR-D in Cottage Grove, Oregon
- K18LS-D in Strong City, Oklahoma
- K18LT-D in Eagle Nest, New Mexico
- K18LU-D in Glendale, etc., Oregon
- K18LY-D in Seiling, Oklahoma
- K18LZ-D in Kingman, Arizona
- K18MB-D in International Falls, Minnesota
- K18MC-D in Enterprise, Utah
- K18MD-D in Childress, Texas
- K18ME-D in Richfield, etc., Utah
- K18MF-D in Torrey, etc., Utah
- K18MG-D in Panguitch, Utah
- K18MH-D in Rural Garfield, Utah
- K18MI-D in Circleville, etc., Utah
- K18MJ-D in Nephi, Utah
- K18ML-D in Henrieville, Utah
- K18MM-D in Rural Sevier County, Utah
- K18MN-D in Koosharem, Utah
- K18MO-D in Worthington, Minnesota
- K18MQ-D in Bluff & area, Utah
- K18MR-D in Montezuma Creek-Aneth, Utah
- K18MS-D in Akron, Colorado
- K18MT-D in Cedar City, Utah
- K18MV-D in Scipio/Holden, Utah
- K18MW-D in Leamington, Utah
- K18MX-D in Orangeville, etc., Utah
- K18MY-D in East Carbon County, Utah
- K18MZ-D in Forsyth, Montana
- K18NA-D in Pahrump, Nevada
- K18NB-D in Wray, Colorado
- K18NC-D in Malad, Idaho
- K18ND-D in Chico and Paradise, California
- K18NE-D in St. James, Minnesota
- K18NG-D in McDermitt, Nevada
- K18NH-D in Puyallup, Washington
- K18NI-D in Point Pulley, etc., Washington
- K18NJ-D in Bellingham, Washington
- K18NN-D in Globe, Arizona
- K18NO-D in Lubbock, Texas
- K18NQ-D in Rhinelander, Wisconsin
- K18NT-D in Grand Forks, North Dakota
- K18NW-D in Minot, North Dakota
- K18NX-D in Carlsbad, New Mexico
- K27KD-D in Hatch, Utah
- KAJJ-CD in Kalispell, Montana
- KCEI-LD in Taos, New Mexico
- KCLP-CA in Boise, Idaho
- KCWH-LD in Lincoln, Nebraska
- KDKZ-LD in Farmington, Missouri
- KDOV-LD in Medford, Oregon
- KFTU-CD in Tucson, Arizona
- KHME in Rapid City, South Dakota
- KHMP-LD in Las Vegas, Nevada
- KIRO-TV (DRT) in Issaquah, Washington
- KIRO-TV (DRT) in Olympia, Washington
- KKDJ-CD in Visalia, California
- KPSP-CD in Cathedral City, California
- KQKT-LD in Tyler, Texas
- KRNS-CD in Reno, Nevada
- KRTN-LD in Albuquerque, New Mexico
- KSWE-LD in Liberal, Kansas
- KTEW-LD in Ponca City, Oklahoma
- KTVV-LD in Hot Springs, Arkansas
- KXCY-LD in Cheyenne, Wyoming
- KZCS-LD in Colorado Springs, Colorado
- W18BB-D in Elizabeth City, North Carolina
- W18DZ-D in Ceiba, Puerto Rico
- W18EG-D in Onancock, Virginia
- W18EN-D in Sion Farm, St Croix, U.S. Virgin Islands
- W18EP-D in Weaverville, North Carolina
- W18ER-D in Muskegon, Michigan
- W18ES-D in Mansfield, Ohio
- W18ET-D in Birmingham, Alabama
- W18EU-D in Miami, Florida
- W18EV-D in New Bern, North Carolina
- W18EW-D in Jackson, Tennessee
- W18FB-D in Sutton, West Virginia
- W18FC-D in Florence, South Carolina
- WBDL-LD in Elk Mound, Wisconsin
- WBGR-LD in Bangor/Dedham, Maine
- WBXC-CD in Champaign/Urbana, Illinois
- WCBZ-CD in Columbus, Ohio
- WDTJ-LD in Toledo, Ohio
- WESH (DRT) in Orange City, Florida
- WEZY-LD in Delphi, Indiana
- WIEF-LD in Augusta, Georgia
- WLCN-CD in Charleston, South Carolina
- WLHA-LD in Laurel, Mississippi
- WMEU-CD in Chicago, Illinois
- WMPX-LD in Dennis, Massachusetts
- WMYO-CD in Louisville, Kentucky
- WNYT in Troy, New York
- WOIO (DRT) in Akron, Ohio
- WPGA-LD in Macon, Georgia
- WQDH-LD in Wilmington, North Carolina
- WQFT-LD in Ocala, Florida
- WQWQ-LD in Paducah, Kentucky
- WSTN-LD in Isabela-Mayaguez, Puerto Rico
- WTXI-LD in Miami, Florida, which uses W18EU-D's spectrum
- WUET-LD in Savannah, Georgia
- WUHO-LD in Kalamazoo, Michigan
- WUVF-LD in Naples, Florida
- WVVH-CD in Southampton, New York
- WWNY-CD in Massena, New York
- WXTM-LD in Erie, Pennsylvania
- WZDS-LD in Evansville, Indiana

The following low-power stations, which are no longer licensed, formerly broadcast on analog or digital channel 18:

- K18BW in Yerington, Nevada
- K18DH in Broken Bow, Nebraska
- K18DY in Hillsboro, New Mexico
- K18FZ in Orangeville, Utah
- K18GQ in Ruidoso, etc., New Mexico
- K18GW in Beowawe, Nevada
- K18HL in Amarillo, Texas
- K18IW-D in Rapid City, South Dakota
- K18LE-D in Newberry Springs, California
- K18MU-D in Round Mountain, Nevada
- KJTN-LP in Abilene, Texas
- KJVG-LD in Joplin, Missouri
- KSCM-LP in Bryan, Texas
- KTWN-LD in Searcy, Arkansas
- KUTB-LD in Salt Lake City, Utah
- KXVZ-LP in Plainview, Texas
- KYEX-LP in Anchorage, Alaska
- W18AE in Killington, Vermont
- W18BN in Scranton, Pennsylvania
- W18BS in Hampton, Virginia
- W18DB in Port Richey, etc., Florida
- WAPG-CD in Greeneville, Tennessee
- WDTB-LD in Hamburg, New York
- WHNW-LD in Gary, Indiana
- WJPW-CD in Weirton, West Virginia
- WURO-LD in Roscommon, Michigan
- WVBN-LP in Virginia Beach, Virginia
