= Channel 18 =

Channel 18 or TV 18 may refer to:

- TV18, an Indian television broadcasting company of the Network 18 Group based in Mumbai
- TV-18, a television content rating

== Canada ==
The following television stations operate on virtual channel 18 in Canada:

- CICO-DT-18 in London, Ontario
- CJPC-DT in Rimouski, Quebec

== France ==
- T18 (TV channel), French free-to-air set to launch in 2025

== Mexico ==
The following television stations operate on digital channel 18 in Mexico:

- XHCRT-TDT in Cerro Azul, Veracruz
- XHCTAG-TDT in Aguascalientes, Aguascalientes
- XHHAS-TDT in Huasabas, Sonora
- XHSFS-TDT in San Felipe de Jesús, Sonora
- XHSGU-TDT in Guaymas, Sonora

== Other countries ==
- VAP-TV18, a defunct Tongan television channel

== See also ==
- Network 18, an Indian mass media company
- Channel 18 branded TV stations in the United States
- Channel 18 virtual TV stations in the United States

For UHF frequencies covering 494-500 MHz

- Channel 18 TV stations in Canada
- Channel 18 digital TV stations in the United States
- Channel 18 low-power TV stations in the United States
