= Channel 29 low-power TV stations in the United States =

The following low-power television stations broadcast on digital or analog channel 29 in the United States:

- K29AZ-D in Newport, Oregon
- K29BM-D in Montpelier, Idaho
- K29BN-D in Silver Springs, etc., Nevada
- K29CK-D in Carbondale, Colorado
- K29EB-D in Grand Rapids, Minnesota
- K29ED-D in Everett, Washington
- K29EG-D in Milton, etc., Oregon
- K29EL-D in La Grande, Oregon
- K29EM-D in Manti & Ephraim, Utah
- K29ES-D in Carson City, Nevada
- K29EV-D in Valmy, Nevada
- K29EY-D in Preston, Idaho
- K29FA-D in Beryl/Modena, etc., Utah
- K29FD-D in Lake Havasu City, Arizona
- K29FM-D in Artesia, New Mexico
- K29FR-D in Quanah, Texas
- K29FS-D in Wolf Point, Montana
- K29FY-D in Henefer/Echo, Utah
- K29GI-D in Holyoke, Colorado
- K29GJ-D in Tropic & Cannonville, Utah
- K29GK-D in Twentynine Palms, etc, California
- K29GO-D in Cortez, etc., Colorado
- K29GV-D in Hagerman, Idaho
- K29HB-D in Clovis, New Mexico
- K29HD-D in Idalia, Colorado
- K29HG-D in Jackson, Wyoming
- K29HL-D in Hanalei, etc., Hawaii
- K29HM-D in Lake George, Colorado
- K29HN-D in Escalante, Utah
- K29HR-D in Farmington, New Mexico
- K29HV-D in La Barge, etc., Wyoming
- K29HW-D in Austin, Texas
- K29HX-D in Wanship, Utah
- K29HY-D in Strong City, Oklahoma
- K29HZ-D in Woodward, etc., Oklahoma
- K29IA-D in Centralia, etc., Washington
- K29IB-D in Grays River, etc., Washington
- K29ID-D in Weeksville, Montana
- K29IE-D in St. James, Minnesota
- K29IF-D in Frost, Minnesota
- K29IG-D in Sunlight Basin, Wyoming
- K29IH-D in Meeteetse, etc., Wyoming
- K29II-D in Park City, Utah
- K29IM-D in Samak, Utah
- K29IN-D in Coalville and adjacent area, Utah
- K29IS-D in Round Mountain, Nevada
- K29IT-D in Gateview, Colorado
- K29IU-D in Parlin, Colorado
- K29IV-D in Fremont, Utah
- K29IW-D in Clear Creek, Utah
- K29IX-D in Caineville, Utah
- K29IY-D in Ferron, Utah
- K29IZ-D in Huntington, Utah
- K29JA-D in Alton, Utah
- K29JL-D in Las Animas, Colorado
- K29JN-D in Gold Beach, Oregon
- K29JO-D in Douglas, Wyoming
- K29JQ-D in Fishlake Resort, Utah
- K29JU-D in Garden City, Kansas
- K29KD-D in Delta, Utah
- K29KE-D in Big Falls, Minnesota
- K29KG-D in Idaho Falls, Idaho
- K29KJ-D in Orovada, Nevada
- K29KR-D in Camas Valley, Oregon
- K29KT-D in Thoreau, New Mexico
- K29KY-D in Blackfoot, Idaho
- K29LB-D in Vernal, etc., Utah
- K29LC-D in Truth or Consequences, New Mexico
- K29LG-D in Soda Springs, Idaho
- K29LJ-D in Altus, Oklahoma
- K29LL-D in Phoenix/Talent, Oregon
- K29LM-D in Cottonwood, etc., Arizona
- K29LN-D in Santa Rosa, New Mexico
- K29LO-D in Kingman, Arizona
- K29LQ-D in Polson, Montana
- K29LR-D in Baton Rouge, Louisiana
- K29LS-D in Calexico, California
- K29LT-D in Susanville, etc., California
- K29LV-D in Jackson, Minnesota
- K29LW-D in Rockaway Beach, Oregon
- K29LX-D in Hanksville, Utah
- K29LY-D in Salmon, Idaho
- K29LZ-D in Fountain Green, Utah
- K29MA-D in Boulder, Utah
- K29MB-D in Antimony, Utah
- K29MC-D in Heber City, Utah
- K29MD-D in O'Neill, Nebraska
- K29ME-D in Antonito, Colorado
- K29MF-D in Peoa and Oakley, Utah
- K29MG-D in Hawthorne, Nevada
- K29MH-D in Kanab, Utah
- K29MI-D in Parowan, Enoch, etc., Utah
- K29MJ-D in Rockville, Utah
- K29MK-D in Deming, New Mexico
- K29ML-D in Kanarraville/New Harmony, Utah
- K29MN-D in Fillmore, etc., Utah
- K29MP-D in Garrison, Utah
- K29MQ-D in Redwood Falls, Minnesota
- K29MR-D in Emery, Utah
- K29MS-D in Green River, Utah
- K29MT-D in Scofield, Utah
- K29MV-D in Spring Glen, Utah
- K29MW-D in Duchesne, Utah
- K29MX-D in Manila, etc, Utah
- K29MY-D in Randolph, Utah
- K29MZ-D in Clarendon, Texas
- K29NB-D in Cascade, Idaho
- K29NC-D in Monroe, Louisiana
- K29ND-D in Hot Springs, Montana
- K29NF-D in Anton, Colorado
- K29NG-D in Crested Butte, Colorado
- K29NH-D in Lund & Preston, Nevada
- K29NI-D in Cave Junction, Oregon
- K29NK-D in Eureka, Nevada
- K29NL-D in Wichita, Kansas
- K29NM-D in Spokane, Washington
- K29NN-D in Lucerne Valley, California
- K29NO-D in The Dalles, Oregon
- K29NW-D in Midland, Texas
- K29NX-D in Alexandria, Louisiana
- K29NY-D in Alexandria, Minnesota
- K29OC-D in Chapman, Kansas
- K29OE-D in Rochester, Minnesota
- K29OF-D in Deadwood, South Dakota
- K29OH-D in Victoria, Texas
- K29OI-D in Redding, California
- KBDH-LD in Bend, Oregon
- KBFX-CD in Bakersfield, California
- KBJE-LD in Tyler, Texas
- KBNY-LD in Monterey, California
- KBWF-LD in Sioux City, Iowa
- KCYU-LD in Yakima, Washington
- KDBZ-CD in Bozeman, Montana
- KECA-LD in Eureka, California
- KEHO-LD in Houston, Texas
- KFXL-LD in Lufkin, Texas
- KHDS-LD in Salina, Kansas
- KHPX-CD in Georgetown, Texas
- KIWB-LD in Boise, Idaho
- KJLN-LD in Joplin, Missouri
- KJYY-LD in Portland, Oregon
- KMSG-LD in Fresno, California
- KNKC-LD in Lubbock, Texas
- KOPB-TV (DRT) in Newberg, Oregon
- KPCE-LD in Tucson, Arizona
- KPLO-TV in Pierre, South Dakota
- KPSE-LD in Palm Springs, California
- KPTD-LP in Paris, Texas, uses KDTN's full-power spectrum
- KQMM-CD in Santa Maria, California
- KSAS-LP in Dodge City, Kansas
- KSFZ-LD in Springfield, Missouri
- KTLO-LD in Colorado Springs, Colorado
- KTZT-CD in Tulsa, Oklahoma
- KWMO-LD in Hot Springs, Arkansas
- KWNB-LD in McCook, Nebraska
- W29CI-D in Salem, Illinois
- W29CW-D in Duck Key, Florida
- W29DE-D in Hayesville, North Carolina
- W29DH-D in Moorefield, West Virginia
- W29DM-D in Lewisburg, Tennessee
- W29DN-D in Athens, Georgia
- W29DP-D in Welch, West Virginia
- W29EE-D in San Lorenzo, Puerto Rico
- W29EN-D in Soperton, Georgia
- W29ES-D in Jacksonville, Illinois
- W29ET-D in Coloma, Wisconsin
- W29EU-D in Clarks Summit, etc., Pennsylvania
- W29EV-D in Hackettstown, New Jersey
- W29EW-D in Willsboro, New York
- W29EY-D in Columbia, Mississippi
- W29EZ-D in Elmira, New York
- W29FD-D in Columbus, Georgia
- W29FE-D in Bat Cave, etc., North Carolina
- W29FF-D in Atlantic City, New Jersey
- W29FJ-D in Dothan, Alabama
- W29FK-D in Clarksburg, West Virginia
- W29FN-D in Panama City, Florida
- W29FO-D in Tallahassee, Florida
- W29FQ-D in Pottsville, Pennsylvania
- W29FR-D in Lebanon-Nashville, Tennessee
- WAMS-LD in Minster-New Bremen, Ohio
- WAUR-LD in Aurora, Illinois
- WAZS-LD in North Charleston, South Carolina
- WBGT-CD in Rochester, New York
- WDOX-LD in Palm Beach, Florida
- WDWA-LD in Damascus, Virginia
- WDZC-LD in Augusta, Georgia
- WELL-LD in Philadelphia, Pennsylvania
- WFET-LD in Lewisburg, Tennessee
- WFYI-LD in Indianapolis, Indiana
- WIIW-LD in Nashville, Tennessee
- WJAC-TV in Bedford, Pennsylvania
- WJDO-LD in Macon, Georgia
- WJYL-CD in Jeffersonville, Indiana
- WKIZ-LD in Key West, Florida
- WLEH-LD in St. Louis, Illinois
- WLNM-LD in Lansing, Michigan
- WMVJ-CD in Melbourne, Florida
- WNCB-LD in Fayetteville, North Carolina
- WNYD-LD in New York, New York
- WOMS-CD in Muskegon, Michigan
- WOOH-LD in Zanesville, Ohio
- WPXU-LD in Amityville, New York
- WQMK-LD in Cusseta, Alabama
- WQXT-CD in St. Augustine, Florida
- WSQY-LD in Spartanburg, South Carolina
- WSWF-LD in Orlando, Florida
- WTMU-LD in Montgomery, Alabama
- WTXX-LD in New Haven, Connecticut
- WUHQ-LD in Grand Rapids, Michigan
- WURH-CD in Miami, Florida, uses WPBT's full-power spectrum
- WVTN-LD in Corbin, Kentucky
- WWAT-CD in Charleroi, Pennsylvania
- WXON-LD in Flint, Michigan
- WYGA-CD in Atlanta, Georgia

The following low-power stations, which are no longer licensed, formerly broadcast on digital or analog channel 29:

- K29AA-D in Kalispell/Whitefish, Montana
- K29BH-D in Wellington, Texas
- K29BR-D in Canadian, Texas
- K29CI in Prineville, etc., Oregon
- K29CJ in Eureka, Utah
- K29DF in Ukiah, California
- K29DK in Williams, Arizona
- K29DP in Lordsburg, New Mexico
- K29EC in Blythe, California
- K29EP in Morgan, etc., Utah
- K29EZ in Fruitland, etc., Utah
- K29FF in Kennewick, etc., Washington
- K29GD in Amarillo, Texas
- K29GL in Lincoln, Nebraska
- K29GM in Duckwater, etc., Nevada
- K29HA in Malad City, Idaho
- K29JB-D in Moses Lake, Washington
- K29JD-D in Redding, California
- K29JF-D in Rolla, Missouri
- K29JM in Elko, Nevada
- K29JT-D in Butte, Montana
- K29JW-D in Granite Falls, Minnesota
- K29KH-D in Kasilof, Alaska
- K29MM-D in Billings, Montana
- K29MU-D in Coos Bay, Oregon
- KAPT-LP in Alamogordo, New Mexico
- KBKV-LD in Columbia, Missouri
- KREN-LP in Susanville, California
- KSDX-LP in San Diego, California
- KSWY-LP in Sheridan, Wyoming
- KVKV-LP in Victorville, California
- W29CA in Brunswick, Maine
- W29CB in St. Thomas, U.S. Virgin Islands
- W29DT-D in Tuscaloosa, Alabama
- W29EJ-D in Parkersburg, West Virginia
- WAOH-CD in Akron, Ohio
- WBOA-CD in Kittanning, Pennsylvania
- WEHG-LD in Wausau, Wisconsin
- WEYS-LD in Miami, Florida
- WHVL-LP in State College, etc., Pennsylvania
- WMUR-LP in Littleton, New Hampshire
