= KLUZ-TV =

Television station in Albuquerque, New Mexico

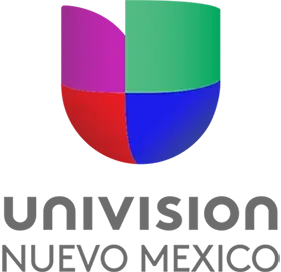
- Albuquerque–Santa Fe, New Mexico; United States
- City: Albuquerque, New Mexico
- Channels: Digital: 22 (UHF); Virtual: 14
- Branding: Univision Nuevo México

Programming
- Affiliations: 14.1: Univision; for others, see § Subchannels

Ownership
- Owner: TelevisaUnivision; (UniMas Albuquerque LLC)
- Operator: Entravision Communications
- Sister stations: KTFQ-TV

History
- Founded: December 1, 1998
- First air date: April 8, 1999
- Former call signs: KAPX (1999–2003); KTFQ (2003); KTFQ-TV (2004–2009); KTFQ-DT (2009–2017)
- Former channel number: Analog: 14 (UHF, 1999–2009)
- Former affiliations: Pax TV (1999–2003); Telefutura/UniMás (2003–2017)
- Call sign meaning: "Luz" (Spanish word for light)

Technical information
- Licensing authority: FCC
- Facility ID: 57220
- ERP: 1,000 kW
- HAAT: 350 m (1,148 ft)
- Transmitter coordinates: 35°24′44″N 106°43′34″W

Links
- Public license information: Public file; LMS
- Website: noticiasnewmexico.com

KLUZ-TV (channel 14) is a television station in Albuquerque, New Mexico, United States, broadcasting the Spanish-language Univision network to most of the state. It is owned by TelevisaUnivision and operated by Entravision Communications alongside UniMás affiliate KTFQ-TV (channel 41). The two stations share studios on Broadbent Parkway in northeastern Albuquerque; KLUZ-TV's transmitter is located in Rio Rancho.

== History ==
=== Prior usage of channel 14 in Albuquerque ===
Channel 14 signed on as KGSW on May 8, 1981. The call sign was derived from the station's original owners, Galaxy Communications and Southwest Television. Initially, KGSW carried drama shows, movies from the 1940s through the 1970s, sitcoms, and religious shows. In the fall of 1983, the station added more sitcoms and began running cartoons in the 7–9 am and 3–5 pm weekday slots.

In 1984, the Providence Journal Company bought KGSW from the original owners. The station affiliated with the Fox network when it launched on October 9, 1986. The station continued a general entertainment format with cartoons, sitcoms, and movies. KGSW also carried a news capsule titled Fox 14 News Update. In the fall of 1992, after KKTO-TV (channel 2) went dark, Providence Journal acquired its programming and integrated it into KGSW's lineup. Shortly afterward, it acquired the KKTO license as well, and on April 5, 1993, KGSW moved to channel 2 and changed call letters to KASA-TV. The channel 14 license was then surrendered to the Federal Communications Commission (FCC) for cancellation.

=== As a Pax and UniMás station ===
In 1997, Paxson Communications was awarded a construction permit for a new station on channel 14; on April 8, 1999, it signed on as KAPX, airing programming from the family-oriented Pax TV (later i: Independent Television, now Ion Television) from 11 am to 11 pm, along with infomercials during the day and religious programming from The Worship Network during the overnight hours. Pax would subsequently cut its programming hours from 4 to 11 pm, and later 5 to 11 pm, due to financial problems at Paxson. The company then chose to sell some of its stations, including KAPX; in 2003, Univision bought the station, and that June relaunched channel 14 as Telefutura (now UniMás) affiliate KTFQ. The network was previously seen in Albuquerque on KTFA-LP (channel 48), which switched to HSN. Programming from The Worship Network continued to air overnights on KTFQ for several years afterward.

=== 2017 call sign and channel swap ===
KLUZ's logo until January 29, 2019.

On December 4, 2017, as part of a multi-market realignment, the programming and call signs of KTFQ and sister station KLUZ-TV were swapped: KTFQ and its UniMás programming moved to the Entravision-owned facility using digital channel 42 and virtual channel 41, while Univision's digital channel 22 and virtual channel 14 facility became the new home of KLUZ-TV.

== Technical information ==
=== Subchannels ===
The station's signal is multiplexed:

Subchannels of KLUZ-TV
Subchannel	Res.	Short name	Programming
14.1	720p	KLUZ-TV	Univision
14.2	480i	Quest	Quest
14.3	480i	H S N	HSN
14.4	480i	CourtTV	Court TV
14.5	480i	DABL	Dabl
14.6	480i	Confess	Confess
14.7	480i	BT2	Infomercials
14.8	480i		MovieSphere Gold

Subchannel broadcast with MPEG-4 video

=== Analog-to-digital conversion ===
Because it was granted an original construction permit after the FCC finalized the DTV allotment plan on April 21, 1997, KTFQ-TV did not receive a companion channel for a digital television station. Instead, on June 12, 2009, which is the end of the digital TV conversion period for full-service stations, the station was required to turn off its analog signal and turn on its digital signal (called a "flash-cut"). KTFQ has been assigned channel 22 for its digital broadcast. Digital television receivers display the station's virtual channel as its former UHF analog channel 14.
