= Fox 14 =

Fox 14 may refer to one of the following television stations in the United States, affiliated with the Fox Broadcasting Company:

== Current ==
- KARD in West Monroe, Louisiana
- KCIT in Amarillo, Texas
- KFJX in Pittsburg, Kansas / Joplin, Missouri
- KFOX-TV in El Paso, Texas
- KOCW in Hoisington / Great Bend, Kansas
  - Satellite of KSAS-TV in Wichita, Kansas
- KSVT-LD in Twin Falls, Idaho

== Former ==
- KGSW (now KTFQ-DT) in Albuquerque, New Mexico (1986–1993)
- WYDO in Greenville, North Carolina (1992–2025)
