= KCLP =

KCLP may refer to:

- KCLP (FM), a radio station (101.1 FM) licensed to Luverne, Minnesota, United States
- KCLP-CD, a television station (channel 18) formerly licensed to Boise, Idaho, United States
