= WVBN =

WVBN may refer to:

- WVBN (FM), a radio station (103.9 FM) licensed to Bronxville, New York, United States
- WVBN-LP, a low–power television station in Virginia Beach, Virginia, that operated from 1995 to 2020
- WVBN (Turin, New York), a radio station (107.7 FM) that operated from 1948 to 1951
