= KAZQ =

Television station in Albuquerque, New Mexico

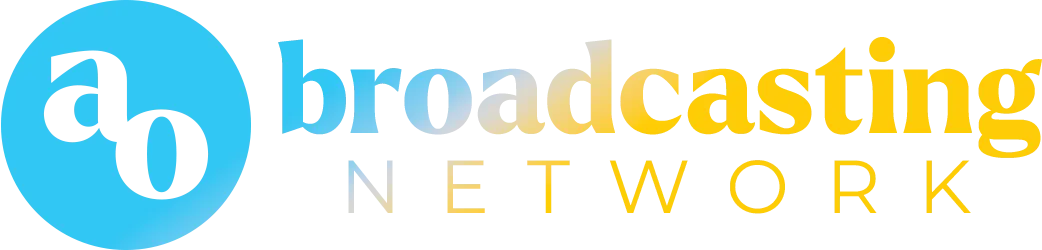
- Albuquerque, New Mexico; United States
- Channels: Digital: 17 (UHF); Virtual: 32
- Branding: AO Broadcasting Network

Programming
- Affiliations: 32.1: Non-commercial religious independent; for others, see § KAZQ subchannels

Ownership
- Owner: Alpha Omega Broadcasting of Albuquerque, Inc.
- Sister stations: KTVS-LD

History
- Founded: June 30, 1986
- First air date: October 12, 1987
- Former channel numbers: Analog: 32 (UHF, 1987–2009)
- Former affiliations: GOD TV (32.2, 2007–2017)
- Call sign meaning: "AZ" (Alpha Omega) Albuquerque

Technical information
- Licensing authority: FCC
- Facility ID: 1151
- ERP: 65.6 kW
- HAAT: 1,247 m (4,091 ft)
- Transmitter coordinates: 35°12′51.1″N 106°27′3″W

Links
- Public license information: Public file; LMS
- Website: www.aobroadcasting.org

Sister station
- KTVS-LD
- Albuquerque, New Mexico
- Channels: Digital: 23 (UHF); Virtual: 36

Programming
- Affiliations: 36.1: Independent; 36.2: Almavision

History
- Founded: October 31, 1986
- First air date: May 31, 1989
- Former call signs: K59DB (1986–2003); KTVS-LP (2003–2009)
- Former channel numbers: Analog: 59 (UHF, 1989–2001), 36 (UHF, 2001–2009); Digital: 36 (UHF, 2009–2018)

Technical information
- Facility ID: 13791
- Class: LD
- ERP: 8 kW
- HAAT: 1,207.8 m (3,963 ft)
- Transmitter coordinates: 35°12′51.1″N 106°27′3″W

Links
- Public license information: LMS

KAZQ (channel 32) is a non-commercial religious independent television station in Albuquerque, New Mexico, United States. Its transmitter is located on Sandia Crest northeast of Albuquerque. Owned by Alpha Omega Broadcasting, KAZQ is sister to low-power station KTVS-LD (channel 36). Collectively branded as the AO Broadcasting Network, the two stations share studios on Montgomery Boulevard Northeast in Albuquerque.

== History ==
KAZQ was issued an original construction permit on June 30, 1986, began operation on October 12, 1987, and was licensed by the FCC on March 29, 1988. The station was originally a cable channel for nine years until it stopped broadcasting on July 31, 1987. Initially, it aired only Christian programming, but later added family-friendly secular programs to its schedule. KAZQ has been under the same ownership since the station was founded and is one of three full-power Christian television stations in the market—the others are KNAT-TV (channel 23) and KCHF (channel 11).

== Programming ==
KAZQ broadcasts on a reserved educational channel and cannot carry any advertising or infomercials, although it airs several hours a day of family entertainment.

Alpha Omega Broadcasting also owns low-power station KTVS-LD (channel 36), which features more secular programming.

== Technical information ==
The stations' signals are multiplexed:

=== KAZQ subchannels ===
Subchannels of KAZQ
| Subchannel | Res. | Short name | Programming |
|---|---|---|---|
| 32.1 | 720p | KAZQ-DT | Main KAZQ programming |
| 32.2 | 480i | Victory | Victory Channel |
| 32.3 | 480i | SBN | SonLife (4:3) |
| 32.4 | 480i | GEB | GEB Network (4:3) |
| 32.5 | 480i | Daystar | Daystar (4:3) |
| 32.6 | 480i | GL | Greater Love TV (4:3) |

=== KTVS-LD subchannels ===
Subchannels of KTVS-LD
| Subchannel | Res. | Short name | Programming |
|---|---|---|---|
| 36.1 | 720p | KTVS-LD | Independent |
| 36.2 | 480i | 36-2 | Almavision (4:3) |

=== Analog-to-digital conversion ===
In 1997, the FCC allotted UHF channel 17 for KAZQ's digital television station. KAZQ applied for a construction permit in May 2000; it was granted February 12, 2001, allowing the station to begin building its digital facilities. Special Temporary Authorization granted in March 2003 allowed KAZQ-DT to go on the air at reduced power while continuing to build full-power facilities. The station obtained its DTV license on January 6, 2006. KAZQ has elected to remain on channel 17 after the end of the DTV transition on June 12, 2009. Digital television receivers display the station's virtual channel as its former UHF analog channel 32.
