= WDTB =

WDTB may refer to:

- WDTB-LD, a defunct television station (channel 18, virtual 39) formerly licensed to serve Hamburg, New York, United States
- the Warning Decision Training Branch
