= KNAT-TV =

Television station in Albuquerque, New Mexico

- Albuquerque–Santa Fe, New Mexico; United States
- City: Albuquerque, New Mexico
- Channels: Digital: 24 (UHF); Virtual: 23

Programming
- Affiliations: 23.1: TBN; for others, see § Subchannels

Ownership
- Owner: Trinity Broadcasting Network; (Trinity Broadcasting of Texas, Inc.)

History
- First air date: August 10, 1975
- Former call signs: KMXN-TV (1975–1980); KLKK-TV (1980–1982)
- Former channel numbers: Analog: 23 (UHF, 1975–2009)
- Former affiliations: SIN (1975–1978); Independent (1978–1985); Dark (May 1985–December 1985)

Technical information
- Licensing authority: FCC
- Facility ID: 993
- ERP: 320 kW
- HAAT: 1,245 m (4,085 ft)
- Transmitter coordinates: 35°12′54″N 106°27′4″W

Links
- Public license information: Public file; LMS
- Website: www.tbn.org

KNAT-TV (channel 23) is a religious television station in Albuquerque, New Mexico, United States, owned by the Trinity Broadcasting Network (TBN). The station's transmitter is located on Sandia Crest.

KNAT-TV formerly operated from a studio located on Coors Boulevard in northwestern Albuquerque. That facility was one of several closed by TBN in 2019 following the Federal Communications Commission (FCC)'s abolition of the "Main Studio Rule", which required full-service television stations like KNAT-TV to maintain facilities in or near their communities of license.

== History ==
=== KMXN-TV ===
Channel 23 began broadcasting as KMXN-TV on August 10, 1975. It was owned by Spanish Television of New Mexico, headed by state senator Odis Echols, and affiliated with the Spanish International Network, broadcasting from a transmitter atop the Western Bank Building.

Problems emerged with the station's management more than a year after it began operations. At the start of 1977, Herbert Taylor, a former officer of Spanish Television of New Mexico, sued Echols, fellow state senator C. B. Trujillo of Taos, and John Aragon, stockholder and president of New Mexico Highlands University, alleging that the three were using KMXN-TV to provide advertising kickbacks and for other political purposes. The First National Bank sued the station in December 1977, claiming it had defaulted on a $67,500 loan made in March 1976; by that time, Echols had stepped down.

Channel 23 also began to branch out beyond Spanish-language shows. When ABC affiliate KOAT-TV (channel 7) decided not to air Monday Night Baseball, KMXN-TV stepped in to carry it instead; the station then added high school football games.

=== KLKK-TV ===
In 1978, Eddie Peña began buying out the partners of Spanish Television of New Mexico. Peña was granted a construction permit the next year to move the transmitter from downtown to Sandia Crest, the main tower site for the Albuquerque area.

Peña also prepared a total relaunch of channel 23's programming. The station shifted to an English-language independent—New Mexico's first—on May 19, 1980, and took on the call letters KLKK-TV. As part of the changes, channel 23 disaffiliated from SIN, which Peña blamed for providing Latin American programming that was not well received in the Albuquerque market. Local productions included pre-existing shows from the Hispanic Chamber of Commerce that had aired on KMXN-TV, as well as Pueblo Speaks, focusing on Native American issues, and a live call-in show. SIN would not be gone from Albuquerque for long, as a translator carrying the network began broadcasting in August.

Not long after the relaunch, Peña began seeking buyers. Rumors circulated as early as the spring of 1981 that channel 23 would be sold. When fired general manager Milt Ledet sued the station for breach of contract at year's end, he revealed that a sale was near, and that he was entitled to two percent of the proceeds. While a $7 million purchase by Malcolm Glazer was reported, it was another buyer that would win out in April: Carson Communications Corporation. A star-studded consortium headed by Johnny Carson and with Neil Simon, David Letterman, Joan Rivers and Paul Anka as other investors, Carson Communications acquired the station and its programming contracts for a total of $3.6 million.

=== KNAT ===
After a brief period of silence during the transition, channel 23 emerged under Carson ownership as KNAT on August 8, 1982. The station made an early and aggressive push to court advertisers. Carson hosted some at a gala event in Las Vegas, where his company also owned VHF independent KVVU-TV, while the entertainer also briefly appeared in promotional advertisements. That stopped when the general manager of Albuquerque's NBC affiliate, Hubbard Broadcasting-owned KOB-TV (channel 4), complained to the network; to make amends, Carson cut several promotions for The Tonight Show and KOB-TV's late newscasts.

When Peña had flipped KMXN-TV to KLKK-TV in 1980, it was the first independent television station in the Albuquerque market. A year later, competition emerged when KGSW-TV (channel 14) signed on; a year after Carson took over, the two independents were tied at the bottom of the market ratings. After KNAT relaunched, two more independent stations licensed to Santa Fe piled into a crowded market: KNMZ-TV (channel 2)–which later merged with KGSW to become KASA-TV–and KCHF (channel 11), a religious station. As advertising revenues doubled, program costs increased sixfold due to competition between the independent stations.

On April 25, 1985, it was announced that KNAT would go dark on April 27, though it said two buyers were in the process of scouting out the station. The ownership group had changed its name from Carson Communications Corporation to Albuquerque Broadcasting Corporation, removing any mention of the host, after selling KVVU-TV the year prior. General manager Dave Cavileer cited the failure of ownership to market the station and said that "what they paid for programming broke their backs". Competing station executives claimed that, unwilling to provoke Carson's ire, syndicators let the station slide for months without paying fees to purchase programming. Channel 23 ended up on the air several more days while sale talks continued—airing music videos, as most of the other programming had already been returned—however, the station went off the air at midnight on May 1.

It was more than six months after the station went dark that a buyer finally emerged for channel 23: the Trinity Broadcasting Network, which purchased KNAT for $2.25 million. The station returned to the air with TBN programming on December 17, 1985.

Four years later, in December 1989, TBN sold KNAT to All American TV (not to be confused with an unrelated television syndication company of a similar name), a minority-owned firm which owned several other stations that were TBN affiliates. TBN sold KNAT in order to allow the ministry to acquire a station in a market larger than Albuquerque and remain at the FCC's then limit of 12 stations per group owner. TBN reacquired KNAT with its purchase of All American TV in March 2000.

== Subchannels ==
The station's signal is multiplexed:

Subchannels of KNAT-TV
| Subchannel | Res. | Short name | Programming |
|---|---|---|---|
| 23.1 | 720p | TBN HD | TBN |
| 23.2 | 720p | TVDEALS | Infomercials |
| 23.3 | 480i | Inspire | TBN Inspire |
| 23.4 | 480i | ONTV4U | OnTV4U (infomercials) (4:3) |
| 23.5 | 480i | POSITIV | Positiv |

TBN-owned full-power stations permanently ceased analog transmissions on April 16, 2009. KNAT-TV shut down its analog signal, over UHF channel 23, on that date. The station's digital signal remained on its pre-transition UHF channel 24, using virtual channel 23.
