= KUPT-LD =

Television station in Albuquerque, New Mexico

- Albuquerque, New Mexico; United States
- Channels: Digital: 32 (UHF); Virtual: 2, 16

Programming
- Affiliations: see § Subchannels

Ownership
- Owner: Telemundo Station Group; (NBC Telemundo License LLC)
- Sister stations: KASA-TV; KTEL-CD; KRTN-LD

History
- First air date: August 22, 2014
- Former call signs: K16LC-D (2014)
- Former channel number: Digital: 16 (UHF, 2015–2019)
- Former affiliations: GetTV (2014–2016); H&I (2015–2021)

Technical information
- Licensing authority: FCC
- Facility ID: 198113
- Class: LD
- ERP: 15 kW
- HAAT: 1,231.7 m (4,041 ft)
- Transmitter coordinates: 35°12′53.7″N 106°27′3.9″W

Links
- Public license information: LMS

KUPT-LD (channels 2 and 16) is a low-power television station in Albuquerque, New Mexico, United States. Owned by the Telemundo Station Group subsidiary of NBCUniversal, it is sister to Telemundo owned-and-operated station KASA-TV (channel 2), KTEL-CD (channel 15), and KRTN-LD (channel 33). KUPT-LD's transmitter is located at Sandia Crest.

== History ==
KUPT-LD has been on the air since late August 2014 airing both Movies! and GetTV. In early February 2015, H&I was added and became the main channel but in May it moved to channel 16.3 with Movies! returning to 16.1. On February 2, 2016, GetTV moved to CBS affiliate KRQE's second digital subchannel, and then later to KASY-TV channel 50.3 on January 14, 2017.

On January 18, 2017, Ramar Communications took over the operations of KASA-TV a full powered station and former Fox network affiliate. Telemundo has replaced Fox on channel 2.1 while H&I was shown on channel 29.1 and Movies! on 33.1. Since then KUPT-LD has continued to air these channels as duplicates, however it now serves to provide additional Spanish-language programming remapped to 2.2.

The FCC spectrum auction which concluded on April 13, 2017, removes part of the UHF spectrum from channels 38–51 for television broadcast. KTFQ-TV was assigned the channel 16 position moving over from channel 42 as part of a spectrum repacking. This displaced KUPT-LD which had to move to a different channel number to continue broadcasting. In 2019, it moved to digital channel 32 while remapping to virtual channels 2 and 16.

== Subchannels ==
The station's signal is multiplexed:

Subchannels of KUPT-LD
Subchannel	Res.	Short name	Programming
2.2	480i	TeleX	TeleXitos (KRTN-LD)
2.3	480i	NBCLX	NBC True CRMZ
2.4	480i	Oxygen	Oxygen
16.2	480i	TBD	Roar
16.3	480i	Cozi	Cozi TV
16.4	480i	KASA	Telemundo (KASA-TV)

Simulcast of subchannels of another station
