= WBGT-CD =

Television station in Rochester, New York

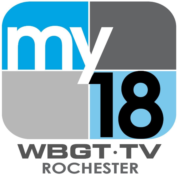
- Rochester, New York; United States
- Channels: Digital: 29 (UHF); Virtual: 46
- Branding: My18

Programming
- Affiliations: 46.1: Independent with MyNetworkTV; for others, see § Subchannels

Ownership
- Owner: Vision Communications; (Stellar Television, LLC)

History
- Founded: July 13, 1987
- First air date: February 2, 1998
- Former call signs: W40AG (1987–1996); WBGT-LP (1996–2006); WBGT-CA (2006–2012)
- Former channel numbers: Analog: 40 (UHF, 1987–2009); Digital: 46 (UHF, 2012–2019)
- Former affiliations: Independent (February–November 1998); UPN (November 1998–2006); America One; Bloomberg Television; Urban America Television (secondary; late 1990s–early 2000s); This TV (46.2; until 2024)
- Call sign meaning: We're Big Television

Technical information
- Licensing authority: FCC
- Facility ID: 10318
- Class: CD
- ERP: 15 kW
- HAAT: 96.9 m (318 ft)
- Transmitter coordinates: 43°8′7″N 77°35′6″W

Links
- Public license information: Public file; LMS

WBGT-CD (channel 46, cable channel 18), branded as My 18, is a low-power, Class A television station in Rochester, New York, United States. It is programmed primarily as an independent station, but maintains a secondary affiliation with MyNetworkTV. Owned by Vision Communications, WBGT-CD has studios on Buffalo Road (NY 33) in the town of Gates (with a Rochester postal address), and its transmitter is located on Pinnacle Hill.

== History ==
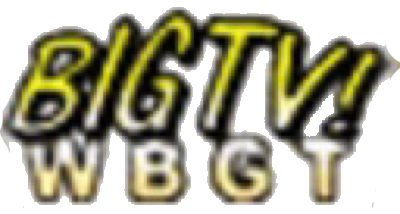
The original WBGT-CD logo, used from 1998 to 2003.

WBGT-CD began operations as WBGT-LP on February 2, 1998. For its first ten months on-air, it was an independent station under the Big TV branding, before it became an UPN affiliate in November of that year (UPN programming prior to its affiliation was primarily available only on cable and satellite systems via New York City's WWOR-TV, while WUHF had a secondary affiliation with the network). Despite the affiliation, the station used the branding throughout most of the years of the network, only ditching it after 2003. The Victor translator was added in 1999, and in 2001, Time Warner Cable (predecessor of Charter Spectrum) added WBGT-LP to its lineup. During the late 1990s and early 2000s, WBGT also carried a part-time affiliation with America One, broadcasting that network's film and children's programming during the daytime and overnight slot, in addition to a simulcast of Bloomberg Television during the morning hours. Select programming from Urban America Television was also aired by the station.

On January 24, 2006, The WB and UPN announced that the networks would end broadcasting and merge to form The CW, which signed with cable-only WB affiliate WRWB (the forerunner of WHAM-DT2). Several weeks later, MyNetworkTV was announced by Fox as an alternative for UPN or WB affiliates not chosen by The CW. WBGT-LP quickly signed an affiliation deal with MyNetworkTV, and joined the network at its launch on September 5, 2006. Around this time, the suffix was changed from "-LP" to "-CA".

The station has never been added to DirecTV or Dish Network; it has no must-carry rights as a low-power operation. Eventually, when it signed on its digital facilities, the station's calls were changed to WBGT-CD.

== Technical information ==
=== Subchannels ===
The station's signal is multiplexed:

Subchannel of WBGT-CD
Subchannel	Res.	Short name	Programming
46.1	720p	WBGT	Main WBGT-CD programming
46.2	480i	Retro	Retro TV (4:3)
46.4	480i	DABL	Dabl
46.5	480i	Catchy	Catchy Comedy
46.6	480i	Toons	MeTV Toons
46.7	480i	Movies	Movies!
46.8	480i	JTV	Jewelry TV

=== Former translator ===
WBGT-CD was formerly also seen over-the-air on analog repeater W26BZ (channel 26) in Victor, which is no longer licensed. This broadcast from a transmitter south of Perinton's Egypt hamlet along the Monroe–Ontario county line. This translator was replaced with another, WGCE-CD, some time before 2018; WGCE was spun off to HC2 Holdings in August 2018.

== See also ==
- Channel 18 branded TV stations in the United States
- Channel 29 digital TV stations in the United States
- Channel 29 low-power TV stations in the United States
- Channel 46 virtual TV stations in the United States
