= KASA-TV =

Television station in Santa Fe, New Mexico

- Santa Fe–Albuquerque, New Mexico; United States
- City: Santa Fe, New Mexico
- Channels: Digital: 27 (UHF); Virtual: 2
- Branding: Telemundo Nuevo México; Noticias Telemundo Nuevo México

Programming
- Affiliations: 2.1: Telemundo; 2.2: TeleXitos; 33.1: Roar; 47.1: Cozi TV

Ownership
- Owner: Telemundo Station Group; (NBC Telemundo License LLC)
- Sister stations: KTEL-CD, KRTN-LD, KUPT-LD

History
- First air date: October 31, 1983
- Former call signs: KSAF-TV (1983–1985); KNMZ-TV (1985–1989); KKTO-TV (1989–1993)
- Former channel numbers: Analog: 2 (VHF, 1983–2009)
- Former affiliations: Independent (1983–1992); Dark (1992–1993); Fox (1993–2017)
- Call sign meaning: Based on Spanish word casa, meaning "home" or "house"

Technical information
- Licensing authority: FCC
- Facility ID: 32311
- ERP: 380 kW
- HAAT: 1,278 m (4,193 ft)
- Transmitter coordinates: 35°12′49.8″N 106°27′3.3″W
- Translator(s): see § Rebroadcasters

Links
- Public license information: Public file; LMS
- Website: www.telemundonuevomexico.com

KASA-TV (channel 2) is a television station licensed to Santa Fe, New Mexico, United States, serving the Albuquerque area and most of the state as an owned-and-operated station of the Spanish-language network Telemundo. KASA-TV's studios are co-located with KOB on 4 Broadcast Plaza SW in Albuquerque; its transmitter is located on Sandia Crest, with translators in much of the state and southwestern Colorado extending its signal and on subchannels of two high-power stations, KTEL-TV in Carlsbad and KUPT in Hobbs.

Channel 2 in Santa Fe was established in 1983 and struggled for its first decade on air as an independent station. It went silent in 1992 during a merger with KGSW-TV, which resulted in 1993 in its relaunch as Fox affiliate KASA-TV. KASA remained the Albuquerque market's Fox affiliate until a merger led to Fox's move to a subchannel of KRQE; at that time, channel 2 and its translators were sold to Lubbock, Texas–based Ramar Communications and switched to Telemundo, which had previously aired on that company's KTEL-CD. Telemundo's parent company, NBCUniversal, purchased all of Ramar's stations in New Mexico in 2021. Local news programs are produced for KASA by KOB, Albuquerque's NBC affiliate.

== History ==
=== Early years ===
The New Mexico Media Co., a group of Santa Fe businessmen backed by California industrialist John J. Pollon, applied on September 10, 1977, for a new television station to serve Santa Fe on very high frequency (VHF) channel 11 (amended two months later to specify channel 2). Both the New Mexico Media application and the other channel 11 bid, which became KCHF, were contested by the Albuquerque television stations for specifying the use of Sandia Crest as the transmitter site, which they contended would have meant an insufficient signal over the city of license.

The Federal Communications Commission (FCC) approved the application on May 10, 1982. By that time, the application had been amended to change the transmitter site to No Name Peak in the Jemez Mountains.

Channel 2 came to the air on October 31, 1983—a day later than announced, prompting the station to apologize on local radio stations and claim it was "a day late but ... not a single program short"—as independent station KSAF-TV. Based in a new studio building at the corner of St. Francis and St. Michael's Drive in Santa Fe, channel 2 promised a strong signal for Santa Fe and Albuquerque, as well as the first live newscast for New Mexico's capital city; the 9 p.m. newscast was scrapped just three months after launch, with the general manager calling it a "drain" on the station's resources as a startup operation.

In October 1984, a California-based investor group bought into KSAF-TV. The new ownership upgraded the programming by acquiring 600 films from a financially troubled KNAT-TV; in order to avoid confusion with radio station KAFE and "KSFE-TV", a former cable channel in Santa Fe, the call letters were changed to KNMZ-TV (stylized as "KNM2") on March 1, 1985.

The station filed for bankruptcy in August 1987, citing $11 million in assets but $15 million in liabilities. Coronado Communications Company, a subsidiary of the Las Vegas–based Sunbelt Communications Company, purchased channel 2 for $3 million in early 1988. Founding investor Pollon bought back the studio building, and KNMZ-TV moved its Santa Fe offices to smaller quarters on Calle Nava while shifting the bulk of operations to Albuquerque. Coronado also laid off 17 staffers to cut back to the "bare bones" necessary for operation.

Coronado made its own repositioning of channel 2 in 1989, changing the call letters to KKTO-TV.

=== Merger with KGSW-TV and Fox era ===
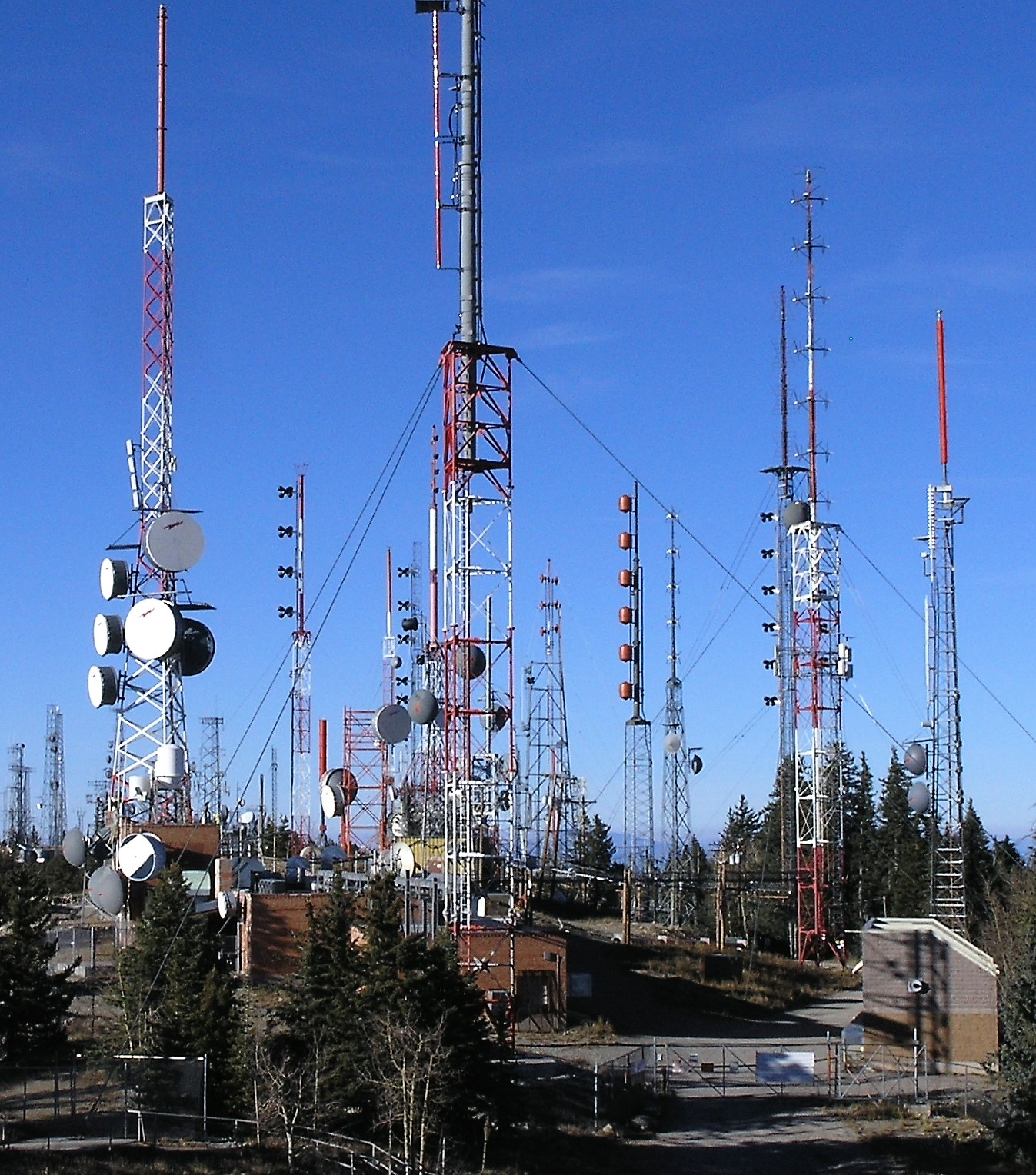
Channel 2 moved to Sandia Crest in the merger of KGSW-TV's stronger programming and ownership with KKTO-TV's channel 2 allocation in 1993.

By mid-1992, KKTO-TV was economically struggling: Coronado had lost $6.6 million in its ownership of the station, and it warned that it could not continue to operate KKTO-TV much longer. That July, the Providence Journal Company (ProJo)—owners of KGSW-TV (channel 14), New Mexico's Fox affiliate—reached a deal to purchase KKTO from Coronado. The deal was made with the express purpose of moving the Fox affiliation and channel 14 programming to the VHF station, which in turn would move its transmitter to Sandia Crest in a $1 million upgrade. ProJo immediately took control of KKTO under a local marketing agreement, firing its 18 staff and rehiring 10.

Programming from KKTO ceased at midnight on September 6, 1992. That same week, the Associated Press news agency had sued the station for $78,700 in unpaid wire service bills. The FCC approved the ProJo purchase of KKTO in January 1993, along with new KASA-TV call letters for channel 2. On April 5, 1993, at 6 p.m., KGSW-TV signed off channel 14, and KASA-TV began telecasting on channel 2.

In 1997, Belo acquired the Providence Journal Company. However, it found that there was no synergy between KASA-TV and its clusters of stations in Texas, the Pacific Northwest, and the mid-Atlantic states and put the station up for sale, along with KHNL in Honolulu, Hawaii, in May 1999. The Albuquerque and Honolulu operations were purchased by Raycom Media for $88 million. Under Raycom ownership, KASA began airing a 9 p.m. local newscast produced for it by KOB-TV in November 2000.

After purchasing the Liberty Corporation in August 2005, Raycom announced its intent to sell KASA and several other stations. On July 27, 2006, Raycom announced that LIN TV, owner of then-CBS affiliate KRQE, would purchase KASA for $55 million and take over operations at the end of August. The creation of a television duopoly involving two "Big Four" affiliates—typically the four highest-rated stations in a market, which cannot be commonly owned—was allowed since KASA was New Mexico's fifth-rated station at the time. The deal also saw KASA move out of its Albuquerque studio site—which had been used by KGSW-TV since its start—to KRQE's facility and switch from airing a 9 p.m. newscast produced by KOB to one from KRQE.

=== The Telemundo era ===
While LIN was able to retain both KRQE and KASA in its merger with Media General in 2014, this would prove not to be the case in 2016 when Nexstar Broadcasting Group reached a deal to purchase Media General for $4.6 billion. KASA and KRQE were both ranked among the top four stations in the market during the November 2015 sweeps period, which meant that the company had to divest one of the two stations to comply with the FCC duopoly rules. On June 30, 2016, it agreed to sell KASA-TV and associated translators to Ramar Communications, owner of Telemundo affiliate KTEL-CD (channel 15), Movies! affiliate KUPT-LD (channel 16), and MeTV affiliate KRTN-LD (channel 33), for $2.5 million.

On January 18, 2017, Fox programming moved to a subchannel of KRQE, as Ramar did not acquire the Fox affiliation in the transaction. KASA switched to Telemundo; Ramar also converted its three existing full-power stations in the market—KRTN-TV (channel 33) in Durango, Colorado, KTEL-TV (channel 25) in Carlsbad, and KUPT (channel 29) in Hobbs—into satellites of KASA.

Ramar announced the sale of its entire Albuquerque-market television operation—KASA-TV, the other three full-power stations, and all of their dependent translators—to NBCUniversal on July 30, 2021. The $12.5 million deal gave NBCUniversal Telemundo owned-and-operated stations in 31 markets and marked the end of 23 years of Ramar's ownership of the Telemundo affiliation in the city. The sale was completed on October 5.

== Newscasts ==
Initially, local news on Telemundo Nuevo México originated from the studios of KJTV-TV, formerly owned by Ramar, in Lubbock, Texas, with reports from Albuquerque-based reporters. As part of the sale, NBC entered into a transitional services agreement with Gray Television, which had purchased KJTV-TV and other Ramar television assets in Lubbock earlier in 2021, to continue news production in the short term; in announcing the purchase, NBC declared its intention to start its own local news service for KASA.

On October 18, 2021, Albuquerque's NBC affiliate, KOB, assumed production of the local newscasts.

== Rebroadcasters ==
=== Satellite stations ===
In addition to the main station, with transmitter on Sandia Crest, KASA-TV operates two satellite stations to rebroadcast the station's programming to southeastern New Mexico.

Full-power satellites of KASA-TV
Station	City of license	Channel	Facility ID	ERP	HAAT	Transmitter coordinates	First air date	Public license information
KTEL-TV	Carlsbad	25	83707	41 kW	120 m (394 ft)	32°26′9.6″N 104°11′16″W	October 27, 1997	Public file; LMS
KUPT	Hobbs	29	27431	50 kW	157 m (515 ft)	32°43′28″N 103°5′48″W	July 5, 1983	Public file; LMS

=== Translators ===
KASA-TV has 23 low-power rebroadcasters in New Mexico and Colorado. In early 1987, KGSW-TV began building translators in such cities as Alamosa, Durango, and Farmington. Around the same time, the then-KNMZ-TV built its first rebroadcaster, to serve Farmington.

- Alamogordo: K27HP-D
- Albuquerque: KUPT-LD 16.4
- Artesia: K16LR-D
- Aztec: K27ND-D
- Caballo: K31DR-D
- Carlsbad: K17MN-D
- Deming: K15IG-D
- Eagle Nest: K31NZ-D
- Farmington: K23KL-D
- Gallup: K18HF-D
- Hobbs: K27GL-D
- Las Vegas: K20GQ-D
- Roswell: K15FT-D
- Ruidoso: K28PS-D
- Santa Fe: K31NB-D
- Silver City: K25DI-D
- Taos: K12OG-D
- Truth or Consequences: K22JY-D
- Bayfield, CO: K19LD-D
- Cortez, CO: K07UY-D, K27IG-D
- Durango, CO: K35PU-D
- Pagosa Springs, CO: K19LC-D

== Technical information ==
=== Subchannels ===
The stations' signals are multiplexed. The use of major channel numbers 15 and 33 for KASA-TV's other subchannels correlates to the other full-power former Ramar stations in New Mexico.

Subchannels of KASA-TV
Subchannel	Res.	Short name	Programming
2.1	1080i	KASA-HD	Telemundo
15.1	480i	TeleX	TeleXitos
33.1	480i	TBD	Roar
47.1	720p	COZI HD	Cozi TV (KTEL-CD)
47.5	480i	Nosey	Nosey (4:3)

Simulcast of subchannels of another station

Subchannels of KTEL-TV
Subchannel	Res.	Short name	Programming
33.1	720p	KTEL-TV	Cozi TV
25.2	480i	COZI	TeleXitos
25.3	480i	ROAR	Roar
25.4	480i	KASA	Telemundo
25.5	480i	Nosey	Nosey

Subchannels of KUPT
Subchannel	Res.	Short name	Programming
2.1	480i	KASA-SD	Telemundo
2.3	480i	NBCLX	NBC True CRMZ
2.4	480i	Oxygen	Oxygen
29.1	480i	TeleX	TeleXitos
29.2	480i	COZI H	Cozi TV
29.3	480i	TBD	Roar
29.4	480i	MOVIES	Movies!

Simulcast of subchannels of another station

=== Analog-to-digital conversion ===
KASA-TV shut down its analog signal, over VHF channel 2, on June 12, 2009, the official date on which full-power television in the United States transitioned from analog to digital broadcasts under federal mandate. The station's digital signal remained on its pre-transition UHF channel 27, using virtual channel 2.
