= KRTN-LD =

Television station in Albuquerque, New Mexico

KRTN-LD and KRTN-TV
KRTN-LD: Albuquerque, New Mexico; KRTN-TV: Durango, Colorado; United States
- Channels for KRTN-LD: Digital: 18 (UHF); Virtual: 39
- Channels for KRTN-TV: Digital: 33 (UHF); Virtual: 33

Programming
- Affiliations: see § Technical information

Ownership
- Owner: Telemundo Station Group; (NBC Telemundo License LLC)
- Sister stations: KASA-TV, KTEL-CD, KUPT-LD

History
- First air date: KRTN-LD: 1994; KRTN-TV: March 29, 2001
- Former call signs: KRTN-LD: K56FB (1994–2007); KFAC-LP (2007–2009); KRTN-TV: KTLL-TV (2001–?)
- Former channel number: KRTN-LD: Analog: 56 (UHF, 1994–2007), 39 (UHF, 2007–2009); Digital: 39 (UHF, 2009-2020); Virtual: 33 (2011–2017), 47 (2009–2017); KRTN-TV: Analog: 33 (UHF, 2001–2009)
- Former affiliations: KRTN-LD: The Box (1994–2000); MTV2 (2001–2002); Telemundo, via KTEL-LP (2002–2004, 2009–2017); JTV (2004–2009); MeTV (2017–2023); Cozi TV (2023–2024); TBD (2024–2025)
- Call sign meaning: KRTN-LD: Retro Television Network (unrealized affiliation)

Technical information
- Licensing authority: FCC
- Facility ID: KRTN-LD: 55059; KRTN-TV: 82613
- Class: KRTN-LD: LD
- ERP: KRTN-LD: 15 kW; KRTN-TV: 32 kW
- HAAT: KRTN-LD: 1,231.7 m (4,041 ft); KRTN-TV: 82.5 m (271 ft)
- Transmitter coordinates: KRTN-LD: 35°12′53.7″N 106°27′3.9″W; KRTN-TV: 37°15′46″N 107°54′0.2″W

Links
- Public license information: KRTN-LD: LMS

KRTN-LD (channel 39) is a low-power television station in Albuquerque, New Mexico, United States, affiliated with the digital multicast network Cozi TV. It is owned by the Telemundo Station Group subsidiary of NBCUniversal alongside Telemundo owned-and-operated station KASA-TV (channel 2), KTEL-CD (channel 15), and KUPT-LD (channel 16). KRTN-LD's transmitter is located at Sandia Crest.

KRTN-TV is the full-power satellite station based in Durango, Colorado, that broadcasts on channel 33. This station is also seen throughout the Albuquerque–Santa Fe market on Dish Network and DirecTV channel 33.

Many local commercials on this station are from businesses in Durango and Albuquerque. KRTN also features Durango TV, a local half-hour community show.

Additionally, KRTN is also shown on digital subchannels of these stations:

- KTEL-TV in Carlsbad–Artesia, New Mexico
- KUPT in Hobbs, New Mexico
- K47MQ in Santa Fe–Espanola, New Mexico

== History ==
The low-power station in Albuquerque signed on in the summer of 1994 as K56FB on UHF channel 56. It aired programming from The Box a music video network programmed by viewer request. The Box was purchased by Viacom the parent company of MTV in 2000 and on January 1, 2001, Viacom merged The Box into a "relaunched" version of MTV2. MTV2 aired on channel 56 for about a year and a half but ended in 2002 as MTV2 dropped broadcast affiliates after contracts expired. After relaying sister station KTEL-LP for about two years the station carried shopping programming from Jewelry Television in 2004. Jewelry TV aired until the end of analog operations in 2009. However, Jewelry TV re-affiliated with the station in the fall of 2013 on a digital subchannel.

The analog station moved to channel 39 from channel 56 in fall 2007 with power upgrades which gave the channel a much better signal than it had on channel 56.

KRTN-TV was previously KTLL-TV which had been the Telemundo satellite for Durango beginning in 2001.

=== Classic TV programming ===
In November 2008, the station signed with the Retro Television Network (then known as RTN) which would air reruns of classic TV shows. RTN was also to be carried on sister station KRTN-TV (formerly KTLL) channel 33.1 in the Four Corners area.

In September 2009, the stations changed their call signs to KRTN-TV and KRTN-LD matching the planned affiliations. However RTN had never signed on this station. The network (now called Retro TV) has been available locally since July 2014 on KYNM-CD channel 21.3.

In August 2011, the station added MeTV, a similarly formatted network from Weigel Broadcasting in Chicago, which airs popular shows such as M*A*S*H, Hogan's Heroes, The Mary Tyler Moore Show, and Cheers.

In early July 2015, KRTN-LD added the classic game show network Buzzr from FremantleMedia on channel 33.2 while moving Jewelry TV to 33.3. On January 16, 2017, KRTN-LD added an all-infomercial channel that originated on KUPT-LD channel 16.2.

In early April 2017, KRTN-LD switched its display channel from 33 to 39.

== Technical information ==
The stations' signals are multiplexed:

=== KRTN-LD subchannels ===
Subchannels of KRTN-LD
Subchannel	Res.	Short name	Programming
2.2	480i	TeleX	TeleXitos
39.1	480i	COZI SD	Cozi TV
39.6	480i	TBD	Roar
47.5	480i	Nosey	Nosey

=== KRTN-TV subchannels ===
Subchannels of KRTN-TV
Subchannel	Res.	Short name	Programming
33.1	480i	KRTN-TV	TeleXitos
33.2	720p	TBD	Roar
33.3	480i	Cozi	Roar
33.4	480i	KASA SD	Telemundo (KASA-TV)

Simulcast of subchannels of another station

KRTN-LD began running in digital in late May 2009, rebroadcasting KTEL-LP analog on KRTN-LD on digital 39 (displayed as 47.1). KTEL-LP continued broadcasting in analog until September 2014. KTEL programming was shown in HD from late 2011 until mid-2015. In April 2017, Telemundo was dropped from the signal.

In October 2014, KRTN-LD upgraded its over-the-air signal from 8.4 kW to the maximum power level for low power TV stations at 15 kW with a new antenna pattern that allows for the station to be viewed in areas surrounding Albuquerque.
