= Channel 18 branded TV stations in the United States =

The following television stations in the United States brand as channel 18 (though neither using virtual channel 18 nor broadcasting on physical RF channel 18):

- WBGT-CD in Rochester, New York
- WVVA-DT2 in Bluefield, Virginia
- WWJE-DT in Derry, New Hampshire

The following television stations in the United States formerly branded as channel 18:

- WLNN-CD in Boone, North Carolina
