= TeleXitos =

American television network

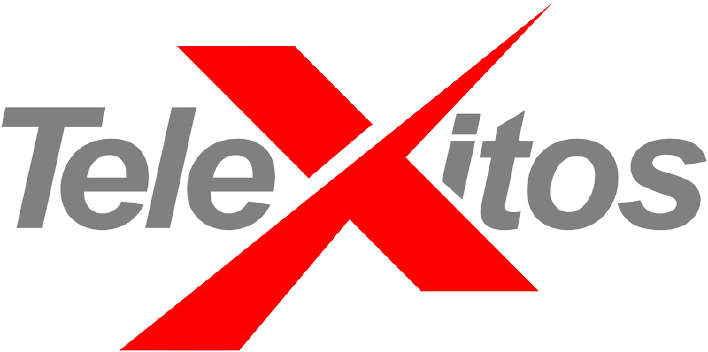
- Type: Free-to-air television network
- Broadcast area: American National via digital terrestrial television in many cities and available through cable and satellite operators
- Headquarters: Miami, Florida

Ownership
- Owner: NBCUniversal (Comcast)
- Parent: NBCUniversal Telemundo Enterprises

History
- Launched: January 28, 2012; 14 years ago
- Former names: Éxitos TV (2012–2014)

Links
- Website: telexitos.com

TeleXitos is an American Spanish language digital multicast television network owned by NBCUniversal Telemundo Enterprises, a subsidiary of the NBCUniversal Filmed and Entertainment division of NBCUniversal, itself a division of Comcast. Aimed at the Hispanic and Latin American community, the network aired a mix of dubbed dramatic television series from the 1970s to the 2000s and movies, before changing to a near simulcast of Universo programming in the mid-2020s.

== History ==
=== Telenovela format as Éxitos TV ===
Original logo as Exitos TV, used from January 28, 2012, to November 30, 2014. Exitos TV used as screen bug until December 1, 2015.

The network traces its origins to Éxitos TV, a digital multicast network launched by Telemundo Station Group on January 28, 2012; Éxitos primarily focused on reruns of telenovelas from the 1990s and 2000s that were previously broadcast on sister network Telemundo. The network was initially launched on the digital subchannels of Telemundo's owned-and-operated stations.

=== Relaunch as TeleXitos ===
On December 1, 2014, the Telemundo Station Group renamed Éxitos to TeleXitos. The new format of the network would shift to focus on Spanish-dubbed reruns of drama and action series from the 1970s to the early 2000s, which in effect made the network a companion service with sister network Cozi TV and a competitor to several English language multicast networks specializing in archived programming including MeTV, Antenna TV and the Retro Television Network – with TeleXitos becoming the first Spanish language network in the U.S. to focus on classic television programs. Telemundo Station Group chose to change the network's format in response to research illustrating the limited availability of action and adventure programs in Spanish. Barbara Alfonso, who previously served as programming and community marketing manager at NBC's Miami owned-and-operated station WTVJ, was appointed as director of network operations, handling responsibility of programming acquisitions, national advertising sales and digital operations.

== Programming ==
TeleXitos' programming focused primarily on action and adventure series and feature films from the 1970s to the 2000s, aimed primarily at males between the ages of 25 and 54 years old, before its transition to a near simulcast of Universo. Much of the network's series acquisitions were sourced primarily from the programming library of corporate sister NBCUniversal Television Distribution (including shows from Universal Television, Revue Studios, NBC Studios and MCA Television), although it featured select programs from other distributors. The network was designed to complement existing programming content on sister network Telemundo, with stations affiliated with that network being given the option of scheduling daily blocks of local news, sports and special events programming in place of shows airing on the national TeleXitos feed. All of the network's content is presented in Spanish. Previously this consisted of dubbed versions originally intended for syndication in Latin American countries.

In the last few years it has been airing programming from Mexican network TV Azteca ever since their American Spanish channel Azteca America ceased operations in December 2022.

TeleXitos also previously broadcast feature films each Monday through Friday from 12:00 p.m. to 4:00 p.m.; or 5:00 p.m.; and Saturdays and Sundays, with the film roster focusing on action, adventure, comedy, drama and western releases from Spanish-speaking countries from the 1940s to the 1980s.

=== Current programming ===
==== Drama series ====
- Hercai
- Historias de la Virgen Morena
- Lo que callamos las mujeres
- Un día para vivir
- Lotería del crimen
- Sangre de mi tierra

==== Reality programming ====
- 12 Corazones
- Escape Perfecto
- Acércate a Rocío
- Caso Cerrado

==== Children's programming ====
- Naturally, Danny Seo (October 5, 2025 – present)
- Journey with Dylan Dryer (October 5, 2025 – present)
- The Visioneers with Zay Harding (October 5, 2025 – present)
- Lucky Dog (October 5, 2025 – present)

==== Movies ====
- Exitos del Cine
- Super Cine
- Cine Millonario
- Joyas del Cine Méxicano
- Inolvidables del Cine Méxicano

==== Sports programming ====
- NBA on NBC (2025–present)
- WNBA on NBC (2026–present)
- Major League Baseball on NBC (2026-present)
- Fútbol Estelar: Liga MX and Liga MX Femenil; used in years where Telemundo has broadcast rights to home matches of specific Liga MX and Liga MX Femenil teams (2020–present for Chivas Guadalajara, Tigres UANL and FC Juárez home matches and selected Chivas Femenil, Tigres Femenil and FC Juárez Femenil home matches)
- Premier League
- FIFA World Cup (2018-2026, Spanish-Language Rights)
- FIFA World Cup - CONMEBOL qualifiers (2026; only Brazil and Argentina home matches)
- FIFA Futsal World Cup (2024 and 2028)
- U.S. women's national soccer team
- NBC Sunday Night Football
- Juegos Olimpicos por Telemundo
  - Summer Olympic Games (2024, 2028, 2032)

=== Former programming ===
==== Drama series ====
- The A-Team (December 1, 2014 – 2023)
- Batman (November 18, 2016 – 2018)
- Baywatch (August 3, 2015 – 2018)
- Hercules: The Legendary Journeys (December 1, 2014 – 2023)
- Homicide: Life on the Street (December 1, 2014 – 2023)
- Knight Rider (December 1, 2014 – 2023)
- Law & Order (December 1, 2014 – 2023)
- Miami Vice (December 1, 2014 – 2023)
- Tarzan (December 1, 2014 – June 23, 2017)
- T. J. Hooker (December 1, 2014 – August 2, 2015)
- V.I.P. (December 1, 2014 – 2018)
- Xena: Warrior Princess (December 1, 2014 – 2023)
- Zorro (2014 – 2022)

==== Reality programming ====
- Ripley's Believe It or Not (December 1, 2014 – 2023)
- Alienígenas Ancestrales (December 1, 2014 – 2025)
- Funniest Pets & People (December 1, 2014 – 2025)
- Garage Customs (December 1, 2014 – 2025)

==== Children’s programming ====
- The Adventures of Dudley the Dragon (2014–2018)
- Godzilla: The Series (2022–2023)
- He-Man and the Masters of the Universe (December 1, 2014–2022)
- Justin Time (2021–2022)
- Men in Black: The Series (2022–2023)
- Pokémon (2020–2022)
- Raggs (2014–2018)
- The Real Ghostbusters (2022–2023)
- She-Ra: Princess of Power (December 1, 2014–2022)
- VeggieTales (2014–2018)

== Affiliates ==
As of September 2015, TeleXitos has current or pending affiliation agreements with television stations in 17 media markets encompassing 10 states (including stations in eight of the ten largest Nielsen markets), covering 27% of the United States.

NBCUniversal currently broadcasts TeleXitos in most markets served by a station owned by the NBCUniversal Owned Television Stations group, either on subchannels of its Telemundo and NBC owned-and-operated stations. The network is also available on the digital subchannels of other television stations, primarily those affiliated with Telemundo. The network is available to stations on a barter basis, in which TeleXitos and its affiliates split the responsibility of selling advertising inventory as well as the commercial time allocated each hour.

The network initially launched in markets reaching approximately 20 million American households with at least one television set, as well as more than 4.5 million households with Latino and Hispanic residents. Telemundo Station Group immediately sought carriage of the network on the digital subchannels of television stations owned by other broadcasting companies (such as ZGS Communications) that own Telemundo-affiliated stations. The network was also initially made available on Comcast Xfinity's Miami and West Palm Beach systems on digital channel 229.

=== List of some affiliates ===
City	Station	Virtual channel (RF)	Owner	Notes
==== Arizona ====
Phoenix	KTAZ	39.2 (29.2)	NBCUniversal Owned Television Stations	
Tucson	KHRR	40.2 (16.2)	NBCUniversal Owned Television Stations	
==== California ====
Corona–Los Angeles	KVEA	52.2 (25.2)	NBCUniversal Owned Television Stations	
Clovis-Fresno-Visalia	KNSO	51.2 (27.2)	NBCUniversal Owned Television Stations	
Bakersfield	KBBV-CD	19.1 (19.1)	Jaco Communications, LLC	
Sacramento-Stockton	KCSO-LD / KMUM-CD / KMMW-LD	33.3 (3.3, 31.3, 28.3)	NBCUniversal Owned Television Stations	
San Diego–Tijuana Baja California, Mexico	KUAN-LD	48.2 (17.21)	NBCUniversal Owned Television Stations	
San Luis Obispo-Santa Maria-Santa Barbara	KKFX-CD	24.1 (24.1)	News-Press & Gazette Company	
San Francisco–Oakland–San Jose	KSTS	48.2 (19.2)	NBCUniversal Owned Television Stations	
==== Colorado ====
Longmont (Denver)	KDEN-TV	25.2 (29.2)	NBCUniversal Owned Television Stations	
==== Connecticut ====
New Britain (Hartford)	WRDM-CD	19.2 (31.4)	NBCUniversal Owned Television Stations	
==== District of Columbia ====
Washington, D.C.	WZDC-CD	44.2 (34.2)	NBCUniversal Owned Television Stations	
==== Florida ====
Miami–Fort Lauderdale	WSCV	51.2 (30.2)	NBCUniversal Owned Television Stations	
Orlando	WTMO-CD	31.3 (31.3)	NBCUniversal Owned Television Stations	
Tampa	WRMD-CD	49.2 (30.2)	NBCUniversal Owned Television Stations	
==== Georgia ====
Norcross (Atlanta)	WKTB-CD	47.3 (23.3)	Gray Television	
==== Illinois ====
Chicago	WSNS-TV	44.2 (33.2)	NBCUniversal Owned Television Stations	
==== Indiana ====
Indianapolis	WDNI-CD	19.2 (16.2)	Urban One	
==== New Hampshire ====
Merrimack, New Hampshire (Boston, Massachusetts)	WNEU	60.2 (29.2)	NBCUniversal Owned Television Stations	
==== Nevada ====
Paradise (Las Vegas)	KBLR	39.2 (20.2)	NBCUniversal Owned Television Stations	
==== New Jersey ====
Mount Laurel (Philadelphia, Pennsylvania)	WWSI	62.2 (28.2)	NBCUniversal Owned Television Stations	
Linden (New York City, New York)	WNJU	47.2 (35.2)	NBCUniversal Owned Television Stations	
==== North Carolina ====
Charlotte	W15EB-D	21.3 (15.3)	Innovate Corp.	
Charlotte	WHEH-LD	41.3 (26.3)	Innovate Corp.	
==== New Mexico ====
Albuquerque	KUPT-LD	2.2 (16.2)	NBCUniversal Owned Television Stations	
Albuquerque	KRTN-LD	39.5 (18.5)	NBCUniversal Owned Television Stations	
==== Oregon ====
Portland	KJYY-LD	29.2 (29.2)	SagamoreHill Broadcasting	
Salem	KJWY-LD	21.2 (36.2)	SagamoreHill Broadcasting	
==== Texas ====
Dallas–Fort Worth	KXTX-TV	39.2 (36.2)	NBCUniversal Owned Television Stations	
El Paso, TX	KTDO	48.4 (26.4)	NBCUniversal Owned Television Stations	
Rio Grande City (Harlingen)	KTLM	40.2 (14.2)	NBCUniversal Owned Television Stations	
Houston–Galveston	KTMD	47.2 (22.2)	NBCUniversal Owned Television Stations	
San Antonio	KVDA	60.2 (15.2)	NBCUniversal Owned Television Stations	
Midland –Odessa	KTLE-LD	20.2 (20.2)	Gray Television	
Lubbock	KXTQ-CD	46.2 (46.2)	Gray Television	
Wichita Falls, Texas	KAUZ-TV	6.2 (22.2)	American Spirit Media (Note: Operated by Gray Television.)	
==== Utah ====
Ogden (Salt Lake City)	KULX-CD	10.2 (14.2)	NBCUniversal Owned Television Stations	
Salt Lake City	KEJT-CD	50.2 (50.2)	NBCUniversal Owned Television Stations	
Salt Lake City	KTMW	20.2 (20.2)	NBCUniversal Owned Television Stations	

=== Former affiliates ===
Market	Station	Channel	Owner	Years of affiliation	Status
Chicago	WMAQ-TV	44.4 (29.4)	NBCUniversal Owned Television Stations	2017	Defunct, former simulcast of WSNS 44.2
San Juan, Puerto Rico	WKAQ-TV	2.4 (28.6)	NBCUniversal Owned Television Stations	2012–2015	Currently blank

== See also ==
- Cozi TV – co-owned English language digital broadcast network, specializing in classic television series from the 1950s to the 1980s.
- MeTV – competing digital broadcast network owned by Weigel Broadcasting, specializing in classic television series from the 1950s to the 1980s.
- Decades – competing digital broadcast network owned by Weigel Broadcasting and CBS Television Stations, specializing in classic television series from the 1950s to the 1980s as well as archival news programming.
- Antenna TV – competing digital broadcast network owned by Nexstar Media Group, specializing in classic television series from the 1950s to the 1990s.
- Buzzr – competing digital broadcast network owned by FremantleMedia North America, specializing in classic television game shows.
- Bounce TV – competing digital broadcast network owned by Bounce Media LLC, featuring television series and movies targeting an African-American audience.
- Grit – competing digital broadcast network owned by Bounce Media LLC, featuring television series and movies targeting a male audience.
- Retro TV – competing digital broadcast network owned by Luken Communications specializing in classic television series from the 1950s to the 1970s, along with select recent programming.
- This TV – competing digital broadcast network owned by Allen Media Group, primarily featuring movies as well as a limited amount of classic television series.
