= Channel 18 TV stations in Canada =

The following television stations broadcast on digital or analog channel 18 in Canada:

- CFRN-TV-8 in Grouard Mission, Alberta
- CHWM-TV-1 in Whistler, British Columbia
- CICO-DT-18 in London, Ontario
- CIHF-TV-4 in Truro, Nova Scotia
- CJPC-DT in Rimouski, Quebec
