= WDTB-LD =

Television station in Hamburg, New York (1993–2024)

- Hamburg–Buffalo, New York; United States
- City: Hamburg, New York
- Channels: Digital: 18 (UHF); Virtual: 39

Programming
- Affiliations: Daystar (until 2024)

Ownership
- Owner: Daystar Television Network; (Word of God Fellowship, Inc.)

History
- Founded: May 31, 1989
- First air date: 1993
- Last air date: February 12, 2024 (license canceled)
- Former call signs: W39BC (1989–1997); WBUF-LP (1997–1999); WDTB-LP (1999–2016)
- Former channel numbers: Analog: 39 (UHF, 1993–1997), 40 (UHF, 1997–2016); Digital: 29 (UHF, 2016–2022)
- Call sign meaning: "Daystar Television Buffalo"

Technical information
- Licensing authority: FCC
- Facility ID: 61426
- Class: LD
- ERP: 15 kW
- HAAT: 122 m (400 ft)
- Transmitter coordinates: 42°53′2″N 78°52′33″W

Links
- Public license information: LMS

WDTB-LD (channel 39) was a low-power television station licensed to Hamburg, New York, United States, which served the Buffalo area. The station was owned by the Daystar Television Network.

== History ==
The station was granted a broadcast license on May 31, 1989, under the call sign W39BC on channel 39, but did not sign on until 1993. When CBS affiliate WIVB-TV (channel 4) was granted channel 39 for its digital signal in 1997, W39BC was displaced, but allowed to move to channel 40, and gained the call-sign of WBUF-LP (no relation to the former WBUF-TV or the current WBUF-FM). In 1999, it gained the call sign WDTB-LP.

Daystar purchased WNGS (channel 67) from bankrupt owner, Equity Media Holdings (formerly under a local marketing agreement (LMA) with and operated by Granite Broadcasting). Because Daystar already had WDTB-LP, it chose to sell the station to ITV of Buffalo, LLC, a partnership owned by local TV personalities Philip Arno and Donald Angelo, for $2,750,000, with plans to program the station from Clarence. As with most sales of its full-power stations, Daystar continues to maintain carriage rights for its network indefinitely on channel 67, and it remains on WBBZ-DT4 as part of the conditions of sale to the present day, de facto operating as its full-market signal in the market.

At the same time, Daystar applied to move WDTB-LP's city of license from Hamburg to Buffalo, and to move to channel 28 afterwards, so it would no longer conflict with CFTO-DT (channel 9). This application was dismissed, though the station was later approved for upgrading to digital operations on UHF 29. The station's digital license was issued on December 5, 2016, with the station changing its call sign to WDTB-LD.

On August 13, 2020, WDTB-LD applied to move from UHF 29 to UHF 18, citing interference from CKVP-DT (channel 29). As of October 13, 2020, the station was dark until the channel reassignment was complete. The station was licensed for channel 18 effective October 28, 2022.

On February 8, 2024, Word of God Fellowship surrendered WDTB-LD's license to the Federal Communications Commission; the license was canceled four days later on February 12.
