= KCLP-CD =

Television station in Boise, Idaho

- Boise, Idaho; United States
- Channels: Digital: 18 (UHF); Virtual: 18

Programming
- Affiliations: 18.1: [blank]

Ownership
- Owner: Treasure Valley Telecasting LLC

History
- Founded: October 24, 1991
- Last air date: 2024
- Former call signs: K22DX; KCLP-LP; KCLP-CA
- Former affiliations: Retro TV

Technical information
- Licensing authority: FCC
- Facility ID: 27621
- Class: CD
- ERP: 15 kW
- Transmitter coordinates: 43°45′18″N 116°5′55″W

Links
- Public license information: Public file; LMS

KCLP-CD (channel 18) was a low-power, Class A television station in Boise, Idaho, United States. Founded October 24, 1991, the station was owned by Treasure Valley Telecasting LLC.

== History ==
On October 24, 1991, the FCC granted a construction permit to Hope Broadcasting Corporation to build a low-power television station on UHF channel 22 to serve the cities of Boise and Caldwell, Idaho. The FCC assigned the callsign K22DX to the station and following two extensions of the construction permit, the station was licensed on August 23, 1994 with a modification of the city of license to only specify Boise. The station took the call letters KCLP-LP in December 1997 and Alpha & Omega Communications LLC acquired the station in September 1999.

Local PBS member station KAID received UHF channel 21 in the DTV Table of Allocations in April 1997 and began building the station in July 2000. Because the digital station was adjacent to KCLP-LP, Alpha & Omega applied to move their station to UHF channel 38 in September, and was granted the permit in April 2001, along with a permit to upgrade the license to Class A. The station was licensed as a Class A station on August 8, 2001. The following November, however, the FCC granted permission to KM Communications to change the specified channel of their new full-power construction permit from UHF channel 14 to UHF channel 39, adjacent to the new channel for KCLP-LP. KCLP-LP applied for a license to cover the move to channel 38 in July 2002, then canceled the application in November. Studies had determined that the new full-service station on channel 39, KKJB, would cause interference to 96% of the households served by the low-power station, now called KCLP-CA, on channel 38. In January 2004, KCLP-CA applied to move to channel 18; the FCC granted the application in May. On March 31, 2006, KCLP-CA was licensed to operate on channel 18.

Alpha & Omega sold KCLP-CA to Treasure Valley Telecasting LLC in 2015, at the same time that the station converted to digital. Its only subchannel was Retro TV.
