= WVBN-LP =

Television station in Virginia Beach, Virginia

Virginia Beach, Virginia; United States
- Channels: Analog: 18 (UHF)

Programming
- Affiliations: The Box/MTV2

Ownership
- Owner: Jacobs Broadcasting System; (JBS, Inc.)

History
- First air date: 1995
- Last air date: July 15, 2020 (license canceled)
- Former call signs: W19BM (1992–1995)
- Former channel number(s): 19 (UHF, 1995–2002)

Technical information
- Facility ID: 32941
- Class: TX
- ERP: 70 kW
- HAAT: 81 m (266 ft)
- Transmitter coordinates: 36°45′39″N 76°7′20.99″W

WVBN-LP (channel 18) was a low-power television station in Virginia Beach, Virginia, United States. It previously broadcast MTV2 (formerly The Box). WVBN-LP was on channel 19 until late 2002. It was owned by the Izzo Family Trust until JBS, Inc., took over in December 2002. Its signal was highly directional—all of its power was pointed towards the north and east to cover the northern half of Virginia Beach.

In 2013, JBS attempted to sell its trio of stations, after founder Samuel B. Jacobs II was found guilty of money laundering, mail fraud and forgery. At that time, WVBN-LP was off the air, while the other stations aired religious programming.

The station's license was canceled by the Federal Communications Commission on July 15, 2020.

== See also ==
- WYSJ-CD
