= KGSW-TV =

Television station in Albuquerque, New Mexico (1981–1993)

Albuquerque, New Mexico; United States
- Channels: Analog: 14 (UHF)

Programming
- Affiliations: Independent (1981–1986); Fox (1986–1993)

Ownership
- Owner: The Providence Journal Company; (KGSW-TV Inc.)

History
- First air date: April 26, 1981
- Last air date: April 5, 1993; (11 years, 344 days)
- Call sign meaning: Galaxy-Southwest Television, original owner

Technical information
- ERP: 1,412.5 kW
- HAAT: 1,274 m (4,181 ft)
- Transmitter coordinates: 35°12′55″N 106°27′02″W

KGSW-TV (channel 14) was a television station in Albuquerque, New Mexico, United States. It broadcast from 1981 to 1993 and was last owned by The Providence Journal Company (ProJo).

An independent station and later Fox affiliate for its entire history, it was merged with Santa Fe's KKTO (channel 2) in 1993 to create KASA-TV, which remained the Fox affiliate for the Albuquerque television market until 2017.

== History ==
On October 7, 1978, Galaxy Broadcasting, Inc., filed an application with the Federal Communications Commission for a new television station to broadcast on channel 14 in Albuquerque. Galaxy, owned by Albuquerque car dealer E. W. Richardson and his associate B. L. Turner, was one of two applicants seeking the channel, alongside Southwest Television, a group based in Tucson, Arizona, and led by Gene Adelstein and Edward Berger. It proposed to operate channel 14 with a mix of ad-supported and subscription television programming, with the latter being supplied by SelecTV. The merger of the two applicants in 1980 led to the creation of Galaxy–Southwest Television, which received the construction permit on May 29, 1980, and purchased the former KOAT-TV studios at 1377 University Boulevard NE. Broadcasting began April 26, 1981, from a transmitter atop Sandia Crest.

In 1984, after being approached with an offer and four months of negotiations, Galaxy–Southwest Television sold KGSW-TV to Mountain States Broadcasting, a joint venture of the Providence Journal Company and Southland Corporation. KGSW-TV sold for $7.2 million; ProJo concurrently acquired Southwest Television's other holding, KZAZ-TV in the Tucson, Arizona, market, for $6 million. ProJo purchased equipment and a new remote broadcast van for channel 14, allowing it to begin broadcasting University of New Mexico athletics. In addition, company executives suggested that channel 14 start producing local newscasts, though local management felt that such a venture would lose money.

KGSW became New Mexico's Fox affiliate in 1986, a partnership that led channel 14 to plan extending its signal to communities in the southern half of New Mexico and southwestern Colorado. Six years later, in 1992, ProJo announced that it would buy Santa Fe-based independent station KKTO channel 2, which at the time was losing money, for the express purpose of moving the Fox affiliation and channel 14 programming to the VHF station, which in turn would move its transmitter to Sandia Crest in a $1 million upgrade.

Programming from KKTO ceased at midnight on September 6, 1992. The FCC approved the ProJo purchase of KKTO in January 1993, along with new KASA-TV call letters for channel 2. On April 5, 1993, at 6 p.m., KGSW-TV signed off channel 14, and KASA-TV began telecasting on channel 2.
