= KTFQ-TV =

Television station in Albuquerque, New Mexico

- Albuquerque–Santa Fe, New Mexico; United States
- City: Albuquerque, New Mexico
- Channels: Digital: 16 (UHF); Virtual: 41
- Branding: UniMás Nuevo México

Programming
- Affiliations: 41.1: UniMás; for others, see § Subchannels

Ownership
- Owner: Entravision Communications; (Entravision Holdings, LLC)
- Sister stations: KLUZ-TV

History
- Founded: September 19, 1985
- First air date: September 5, 1987
- Former call signs: KLUZ-TV (1987–2017)
- Former channel numbers: Analog: 41 (UHF, 1987–2009); Digital: 42 (UHF, 2000–2019)
- Former affiliations: Univision (1987–2017)
- Call sign meaning: Telefutura Albuquerque

Technical information
- Licensing authority: FCC
- Facility ID: 35084
- ERP: 350 kW
- HAAT: 1,255 m (4,117 ft)
- Transmitter coordinates: 35°12′41.1″N 106°26′58″W

Links
- Public license information: Public file; LMS
- Website: UniMás

KTFQ-TV (channel 41) is a television station in Albuquerque, New Mexico, United States, broadcasting the Spanish-language UniMás network to most of the state. It is owned by Entravision Communications, which is co-managed with Univision affiliate KLUZ-TV (channel 14). The two stations share studios on Broadbent Parkway in northeastern Albuquerque; KTFQ-TV's transmitter is located on Sandia Crest.

== History ==
The station began operation in September 1987 as Univision affiliate KLUZ-TV. In 2007, it added LATV as a digital subchannel on 41.2.

=== 2017 call sign and channel swap ===
On December 4, 2017, as part of a multi-market realignment, the programming and call signs of KLUZ-TV and sister station KTFQ were swapped: KLUZ-TV and its Univision programming moved to the Univision-owned facility using digital channel 22 and virtual channel 14, while Entravision's digital channel 42 and virtual channel 41 facility became the new home of UniMás affiliate KTFQ-TV.

== Newscasts ==
KLUZ's logo prior to January 1, 2013

In 1992, KLUZ premiered a news program called 5 en Punto (five o'clock). In 1993, KLUZ launched Albuquerque's first Spanish-language newscast, Noticias 41. The show was anchored by New Mexico native Bonita Ulibarrí, along with weatherman Sergio Schwartz and sportscaster Liliana Carrillo. The newscast aired Monday through Friday at 10 p.m.

In 1993, the station launched a 5 p.m. program that replaced 5 en Punto and was anchored by Ulibarrí. Schwartz continued to do weather, but a new sportscaster, Donaldo Zepeda, was introduced. For the 10 p.m. broadcast, Ulibarrí was replaced as anchor by Susana Olivares, with Zepeda and Schwartz in the same respective roles.

On January 30, 1994, the station hired Roberto Repreza to anchor both the 5 p.m. and 10 p.m. newscasts. Ulibarrí returned to the 10 p.m. broadcast as a co-anchor. In 1996, Repreza left to go to KXLN-TV, and Ulibarrí returned to being the sole anchor.

On November 2, 2015, Entravision transferred production of KLUZ's newscasts from Albuquerque to Denver sister station KCEC.

== Technical information ==
=== Subchannels ===
The station's signal is multiplexed:

Subchannels of KTFQ-TV
Subchannel	Res.	Short name	Programming
41.1	1080i	KTFQ-HD	UniMás
41.2	480i	LATV	LATV
41.3	480i	HSN	HSN
41.4	480i	Charge!	Charge!
41.7	480i	KRZY-FM	KRZY 105.9
41.88	1080i	AltaVsn	AltaVision

Subchannel broadcast with MPEG-4 video

=== Analog-to-digital conversion ===
KTFQ-TV (as KLUZ-TV) shut down its analog signal, over UHF channel 41, on June 12, 2009, which was the official date on which full-power television stations in the United States transitioned from analog to digital broadcasts under federal mandate. The station's digital signal remained on its pre-transition UHF channel 42, using virtual channel 41.
