= KENW (TV) =

Television station in Portales, New Mexico

- Portales, New Mexico; United States
- Channels: Digital: 32 (UHF); Virtual: 3
- Branding: KENW PBS New Mexico

Programming
- Affiliations: 3.1/3.2: PBS; for others, see § Subchannels

Ownership
- Owner: Eastern New Mexico University
- Sister stations: KENW-FM

History
- First air date: September 1, 1974
- Former channel numbers: Analog: 3 (VHF, 1974–2009)
- Call sign meaning: Eastern New Mexico

Technical information
- Licensing authority: FCC
- Facility ID: 18338
- ERP: 82.6 kW
- HAAT: 190.2 m (624.0 ft)
- Transmitter coordinates: 34°15′8.4″N 103°14′22.4″W

Links
- Public license information: Public file; LMS
- Website: kenw.org

KENW (channel 3) is a PBS member television station in Portales, New Mexico, United States. Owned by the Eastern New Mexico University, it is sister to NPR member station KENW-FM (89.5 MHz). Both stations share studios at the Duane Weldon Ryan Broadcast Center on South Avenue K at the campus and transmitter facilities along State Road 88 (east of Portales).

== History ==
The station signed on on September 1, 1974, as the first public television station in eastern New Mexico. For the first 14 years of its existence, it was the only PBS member station to indirectly serve both Amarillo and Midland-Odessa, although most public television programming in those areas was broadcast by the region's commercial television stations. This situation was remedied when KPBT-TV and KACV-TV launched in 1986 and 1988, respectively.

== Programming ==
This station is unique in that it provides local regional news to southeastern New Mexico with an entirely college student produced newscast entitled "News 3 New Mexico." The newscast includes hard news, local, and regional news pertinent to people in southeast New Mexico and rarely covers what a traditional college campus newscast covers.

Shows produced by KENW include the nationally syndicated show Creative Living with Sheryl Borden, Report from Santa Fe hosted by Lorene Mills, Cultura, You Should Know (with host Evelyn Ledbetter), Sportslook, a weekly regional sports show, and “A Moment with Nature” interstitials from the 1990s, with Antonio “Tony” Gennaro (1934–2015).

== Creative Living with Sheryl Borden ==
Creative Living with Sheryl Borden is a KENW produced program airing on public television since 1976. It is a magazine-formatted program with cooking, sewing and craft tips hosted by Sheryl Borden. The program runs 30 minutes. It is taped at KENW-TV. As of 2018, the show is carried on more than 118 PBS stations in over 40 states as well as Canada, Guam and Puerto Rico.

== Subchannels ==
Subchannels of KENW
| Subchannel | Res. | Short name | Programming |
|---|---|---|---|
| 3.1 | 1080i | KENW HD | PBS |
| 3.2 | 1080i | KENW HD | PBS |
| 3.3 | 480i | KENW SD | PBS Kids/Encore |
| 3.4 | 480i | KENW SD | First Nations Experience |

== Translators ==
| City of license | Callsign | Channel | ERP | HAAT | Facility ID | Transmitter coordinates |
|---|---|---|---|---|---|---|
| Artesia | K29FM-D | 29 | 0.9 kW | 47 m (154 ft) | 130369 | 32°50′23.7″N 104°25′44.1″W |
| Carlsbad | K23MV-D | 23 | 7.9 kW | 85 m (279 ft) | 168077 | 32°26′17.1″N 104°16′38.3″W |
| Fort Sumner | K21IM-D | 21 | 15 kW | 59 m (194 ft) | 168076 | 34°28′35.2″N 104°21′25.9″W |
| Mescalero (Mud Canyon) | K18LM-D | 18 | 1 kW | 47 m (154 ft) | 198160 | 33°11′30.2″N 105°42′50.6″W |
| Mescalero (Soldier Canyon) | K26MV-D | 26 | 1 kW | 145 m (476 ft) | 198159 | 33°10′0.4″N 105°46′36.6″W |
| Roswell | K31GS-D | 31 | 15 kW | 80 m (262 ft) | 13376 | 33°24′15.3″N 104°22′49.8″W |
| Ruidoso | K35GU-D | 35 | 0.55 kW | 923 m (3,028 ft) | 130964 | 33°24′14.2″N 105°46′56.9″W |
| Tucumcari | K30HD-D | 30 | 12 kW | 274 m (899 ft) | 131009 | 35°8′3.4″N 103°41′55.4″W |
