= KCHF =

Television station in Santa Fe, New Mexico

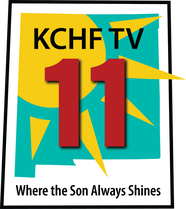
- Santa Fe–Albuquerque, New Mexico; United States
- City: Santa Fe, New Mexico
- Channels: Digital: 10 (VHF); Virtual: 11
- Branding: KCHF TV 11

Programming
- Affiliations: 11.1: Religious Independent; for others, see § Subchannels

Ownership
- Owner: Belarmino Gonzalez; (Son Broadcasting, Inc.)
- Sister stations: KNMQ-LD, KYNM-CD

History
- First air date: January 21, 1984
- Former channel numbers: Analog: 11 (VHF, 1984–2009)

Technical information
- Licensing authority: FCC
- Facility ID: 60793
- ERP: 22 kW
- HAAT: 1,252 m (4,108 ft)
- Transmitter coordinates: 35°12′53.51″N 106°27′3.94″W
- Translator(s): see § Translators

Links
- Public license information: Public file; LMS
- Website: www.kchftv.org

KCHF (channel 11) is a religious independent television station licensed to Santa Fe, New Mexico, United States, serving the Albuquerque area and most of the state. It is owned by the estate of Belarmino "Blackie" Gonzalez and his non-profit ministry, Son Broadcasting. KCHF's studios are located on 4th Street in northwestern Albuquerque, and its transmitter is located on Sandia Crest.

KCHF is relayed on translators K24ML-D (channel 24) in Taos, New Mexico, and K29ME-D (channel 29) in Antonito, Colorado.

== History ==
The original construction permit for KCHF was granted on January 19, 1983. The station signed on in January 1984 and was granted a license to cover on June 29, 1984, from a transmitter near Los Alamos, New Mexico. It claims to be the first VHF Christian television station in the United States. During the analog era, KCHF was one of a few Christian television stations in the United States to operate on the VHF band (KJNP-TV in Fairbanks, Alaska, is another example).

KCHF's digital transmitter was licensed on January 26, 2006. The transmitter was relocated to Sandia Crest in December 2024.

== Programming ==
Some of the programs produced by KCHF include Restoring God's People, Healing is for You, A Healthier You and God Answers Prayer.

God Answers Prayer is a daily studio-based talk show with a live call-in segment. A "best of" show, with highlights of the past week, is seen on Sundays.

As part of its compliance with the federal Children's Television Act, KCHF broadcasts over eight hours of E/I-compliant children's programming each week, mostly aimed at children under 10, including a five-hour block on Saturday mornings.

== Technical information ==
=== Subchannels ===
The station's signal is multiplexed:

Subchannels of KCHF
Subchannel	Res.	Short name	Programming
11.1	720p	KCHF-TV	Main KCHF programming
11.2	480i	QVC	QVC
11.3	480i	QVC-2	QVC2
11.4	480i	Buzzr	Buzzr (4:3)
11.5	480i	ShopLC	Shop LC
11.6	480i	NMax2	Newsmax2

KCHF carried the country music channel Heartland on channel 11.3 beginning June 30, 2014. In early June 2016, Heartland was dropped for QVC with Antenna TV moving from 11.4 to 11.2 and WeatherNation moving from 11.2 to 11.6.

=== Translators ===
- K24ML-D Taos
- K29ME-D Antonito, CO

=== Analog-to-digital conversion ===
KCHF shut down its analog signal, over VHF channel 11, on June 12, 2009, the official date on which full-power television stations in the United States transitioned from analog to digital broadcasts under federal mandate. The station's digital signal remained on its pre-transition VHF channel 10, using virtual channel 11.

== KNMQ-LD and KYNM-CD ==
KCHF also operates two low-power stations in Albuquerque. KNMQ-LD broadcasts on channel 20 and KYNM-CD, a Class A station, on channel 21. Both are licensed to RJ Enterprise Investments, LLC, a sister company of Son Broadcasting.

Subchannels of KNMQ-LD
Subchannel	Res.	Short name	Programming
20.1	480i	KNMQ	Heartland
20.2	480i	ShopTV	Infomercials
20.3	480i	BingeTV	Binge TV
20.4	480i	OAN	One America News Network
20.5	480i	AceTV	Ace TV
20.6	480i	TheWalk	The Walk TV (religious)
20.7	480i	Weather	WeatherNation TV
20.8	480i	JTV	Jewelry TV (4:3)

Subchannels of KYNM-CD
Subchannel	Res.	Short name	Programming
21.1	720p	FamTV	The Family Channel
21.2	480i	JTV	Jewelry TV (4:3)
21.3	480i	NTD	NTD America (4:3)
21.4	480i	Heart	Heartland (4:3)
21.5	720p	KCHF-TV	Simulcast of KCHF-TV
21.6	480i	ComfyTV	Enlace (Spanish religious) (4:3)
21.8	480i	ShopTV2	Infomercials (4:3)

Simulcast of subchannels of another station
