= NBC10 Boston =

NBC TV station for Boston, Massachusetts

WBTS-CD
- Nashua, New Hampshire; Boston, Massachusetts; United States
- City: Nashua, New Hampshire
- Channels: Digital: 32 (UHF), shared with WGBX-TV; Virtual: 15
- Branding: NBC10 Boston

Programming
- Affiliations: 15.1: NBC; 15.2: Cozi TV

Ownership
- Owner: NBC Owned Television Stations; (NBC Telemundo License LLC)
- Sister stations: WNEU; NECN; NBC Sports Boston

History
- Former call signs: W13BG (1985–1996); WYCN-LP (1996–2014); WYCN-CD (2014–2019)
- Former names: NBC Boston (2017–2018)

Technical information
- Licensing authority: FCC
- Facility ID: 9766
- Class: CD
- ERP: 922 kW
- HAAT: 388.3 m (1,274 ft)
- Transmitter coordinates: 42°18′37″N 71°14′12″W

Links
- Public license information: Public file; LMS
- Website: www.nbcboston.com

NBC10 Boston (call sign WBTS-CD, channel 15 and cable channel 10) is a television station in Boston, Massachusetts, United States, owned and operated by the NBC television network. It broadcasts from studios in Needham—shared with NBC Sports Boston, New England Cable News (NECN), and Telemundo station WNEU—and the transmitter of WGBX-TV in the same city.

NBCUniversal, which already owned New England Cable News and WNEU, moved to discontinue its affiliate relationship with WHDH (channel 7) and launch its own owned-and-operated station. After an unsuccessful attempt by WHDH to block the switch, NBC Boston began broadcasting on January 1, 2017, on Boston low-power TV station WBTS-LD and subchannels of WNEU and WMFP; it became NBC10 Boston, reflecting its cable channel number, and moved to its present license in 2018. The change in license gave NBC a full-power signal in Boston.

NBC10 Boston debuted local newscasts from its first day on air, utilizing the resources of the existing NECN–WNEU operation; NBC hired longtime Boston TV meteorologist Pete Bouchard concurrent with the station's launch. It has generally struggled with low local news ratings since its debut.

== History ==
=== Creation ===
NBC came into possession of two Boston-market media assets in the 2000s and early 2010s. In 2002, it acquired channel 60 in Merrimack, New Hampshire, then WPXB-TV, from Paxson Communications Corporation. The $26 million transaction came about because NBC had a right of first refusal on the station. Channel 60 became WNEU and was switched from home shopping programming to the NBC-owned Telemundo Spanish-language network. NBC outsourced operations of the new Telemundo station to ZGS Communications, owner of existing Telemundo affiliate WTMU-LP, and the two stations simulcast programming. NBC merged with cable company Comcast in 2011. Comcast was the owner of New England Cable News (NECN), a regional cable news channel that had originally been a partnership with Hearst Television before Comcast bought out Hearst in 2009. In 2014, it ended the agreement with ZGS in Boston and took full control of WNEU. Over the course of the early 2010s, NBC made major investments in its Boston-area operations. The two stations moved into a new facility in Newton, Massachusetts, and in August 2015, WNEU debuted local newscasts for the first time in its history. This prompted speculation in the industry that NBC was preparing to take the network affiliation from WHDH (channel 7) after its existing agreement expired at the end of 2016. In a feature article, Broadcasting & Cable described Boston as a "treasured quarry" for NBC and noted that WHDH's owner, Sunbeam Television president Edmund Ansin, had no desire to sell. There had been disagreements between NBC and WHDH, most notably in 2009 when Ansin threatened to preempt The Jay Leno Show, a nightly 10 p.m. talk show, for local news. Ansin later revealed that he had turned down a $200 million offer from NBC for the station in September 2015. On October 1, 2015, The Boston Globe reported that NBC had considered moving the affiliation to NECN rather than to a broadcast channel, though this was seen as impractical for legal reasons and because NECN's coverage extended beyond the Boston market.

On December 15, 2015, New England One reported, citing internal sources, that NBCUniversal had declined to renew its affiliation with WHDH and was in the process of preparing WNEU to become an NBC owned-and-operated station by expanding its news operation, including hiring former WHDH meteorologist Pete Bouchard. The Boston Herald reported two days later that the station would prospectively be branded as NBC Boston and that WNEU's existing Telemundo programming could be moved to a different subchannel. Following the reports, Paul Magnes, WHDH's vice president and general manager, told the Herald that the station still expected its NBC affiliation to be renewed, while NBCUniversal declined to comment.

On January 7, 2016, Valari Staab, president of NBC Owned Television Stations, confirmed that NBC had declined to renew its affiliation with WHDH beyond the end of 2016 and would launch NBC Boston on January 1, 2017. Staab cited NBC's investments in NECN and WNEU as providing the basis for the company to launch its own NBC station in the market. At the time, no specifics were given as to broadcast carriage for the new NBC Boston service.

Sunbeam mounted a defense of its NBC affiliation in public. In court, Ansin argued that WNEU's transmitter, which was not centrally located at the time, did not provide adequate coverage and served 4 million fewer people. Shortly before the launch of NBC Boston was confirmed, Ansin told The Globe, "No network has elected to give up such a strong station and go to a startup station". On March 10, 2016, Sunbeam Television sued Comcast in the District Court for the District of Massachusetts. It argued that moving NBC to WNEU would violate antitrust law, by strengthening its near-monopoly position in the market, as well as conditions imposed by the Federal Communications Commission (FCC) on Comcast's acquisition of NBC, as the company had agreed not to reduce over-the-air coverage of NBC or use its cable holdings to influence affiliation negotiations. On May 16, 2016, the lawsuit was dismissed; the judge found that the signal issue was "not a concern that WHDH has standing to redress" and noted, "[A]bsent any actionable harm attributable to Comcast, it is simply an indurate consequence of doing business in a competitive and unsentimental marketplace."

During this time, it was unclear how NBC Boston would be broadcast to viewers, and NBC was linked to several options, including acquiring WBPX-TV (channel 68) from Ion Television or WFXT (channel 25), Boston's Fox affiliate, from Cox Television. On August 31, 2016, NBC moved a step closer to securing signals for NBC Boston by agreeing to buy WTMU-LP from ZGS Communications for $100,000. Concurrently, ZGS entered into a local programming and marketing agreement with another NBCUniversal subsidiary—WBTS Television, LLC—to operate WTMU-LP. The sale was approved by the FCC on October 28 and completed on November 4. The acquisition, though not specifying WTMU-LP, was announced as part of NBC's coverage plan. The station's call sign was changed to WBTS-LD on October 6; on October 25, the station received FCC approval to change its major virtual channel to 8. (Note: This was necessary for a variety of reasons. WTMU-LP had broadcast on analog channel 46. Major virtual channel 46 was unavailable because of WWDP, which had also broadcast on channel 46. The ATSC standards specify that the first option in this case is to use the physical channel number of the other station, in this case 10. However, the new digital signal overlapped another station using major channel 10, WJAR-TV in Providence, Rhode Island.)

=== Launch ===
The Countdown NBC Boston logo used from November 10, 2016, to December 31, 2016

On November 1, 2016, NBCUniversal officially announced that it would broadcast NBC Boston on WBTS-LD and a subchannel of WNEU, as well as details surrounding the station's launch programming and news department. General manager Mike St. Peter pointed out that, although the two stations combined would not have the same over-the-air coverage as WHDH, 97% of viewers in the Boston market were pay television subscribers, and NBC would "continue to look for how we can improve over-the-air service". On November 10, the stations launched a transitional programming service branded as Countdown NBC Boston. Designed to promote the switch and assist viewers in locating NBC Boston's over-the-air channels, the service featured NBC Boston's future syndicated programming, programs from Cozi TV, and newscasts from NECN. The NBC Boston website and social media outlets were also launched at this time. To further improve coverage, on December 12, NBC announced that it had leased a subchannel on WMFP in Lawrence.

The NBC affiliation switch in Boston also affected many cable systems in Atlantic Canada, which use Boston-market TV stations to provide the major U.S. networks. The Canadian Radio-television and Telecommunications Commission (CRTC) received an application from Bell Canada to distribute WBTS in November 2016; the request was approved by the CRTC on December 20, 2016, and on January 1, 2017, NBC Boston replaced WHDH on a variety of cable and satellite systems in the region.

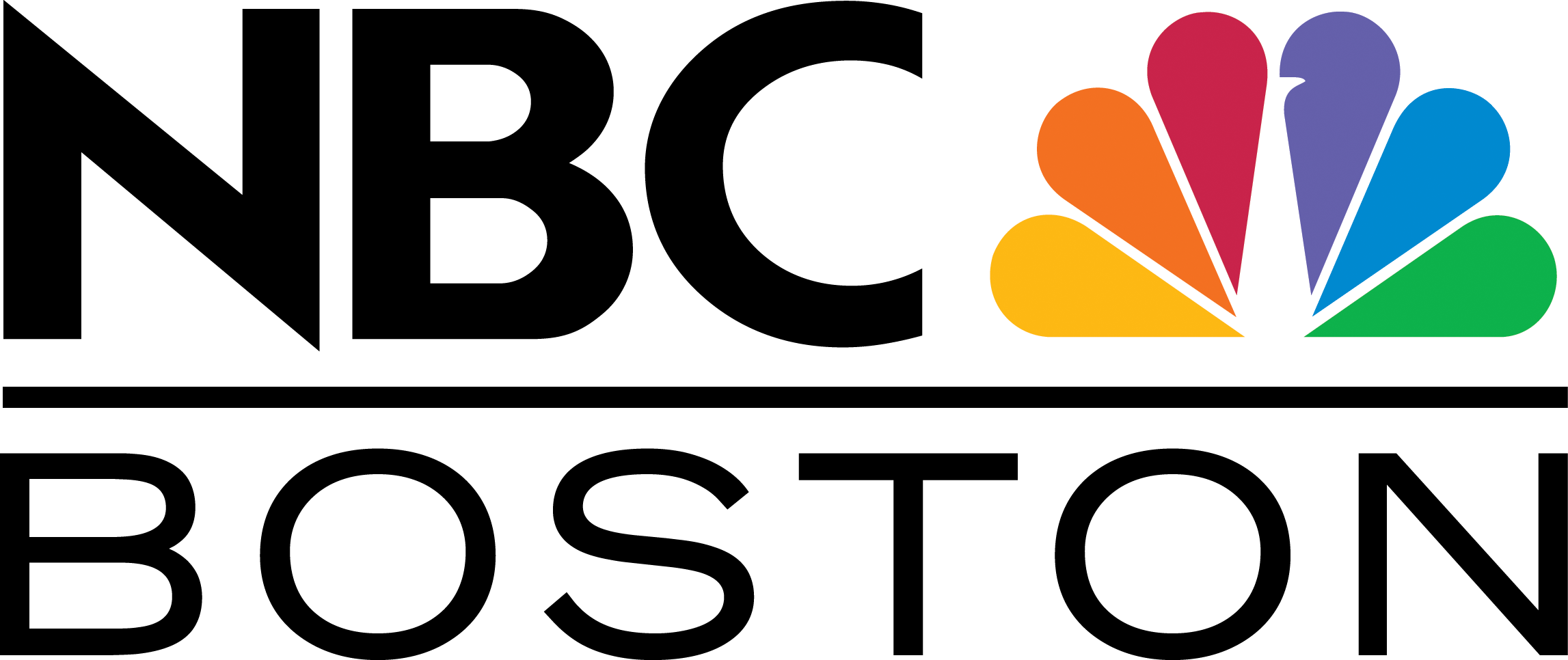
Logo used as NBC Boston

NBC Boston assumed the NBC affiliation at 3 a.m. on January 1, 2017. The previous night, its news anchors, Phil Lipof and Shannon Mulaire, led coverage of Boston's First Night New Year's Eve festivities.

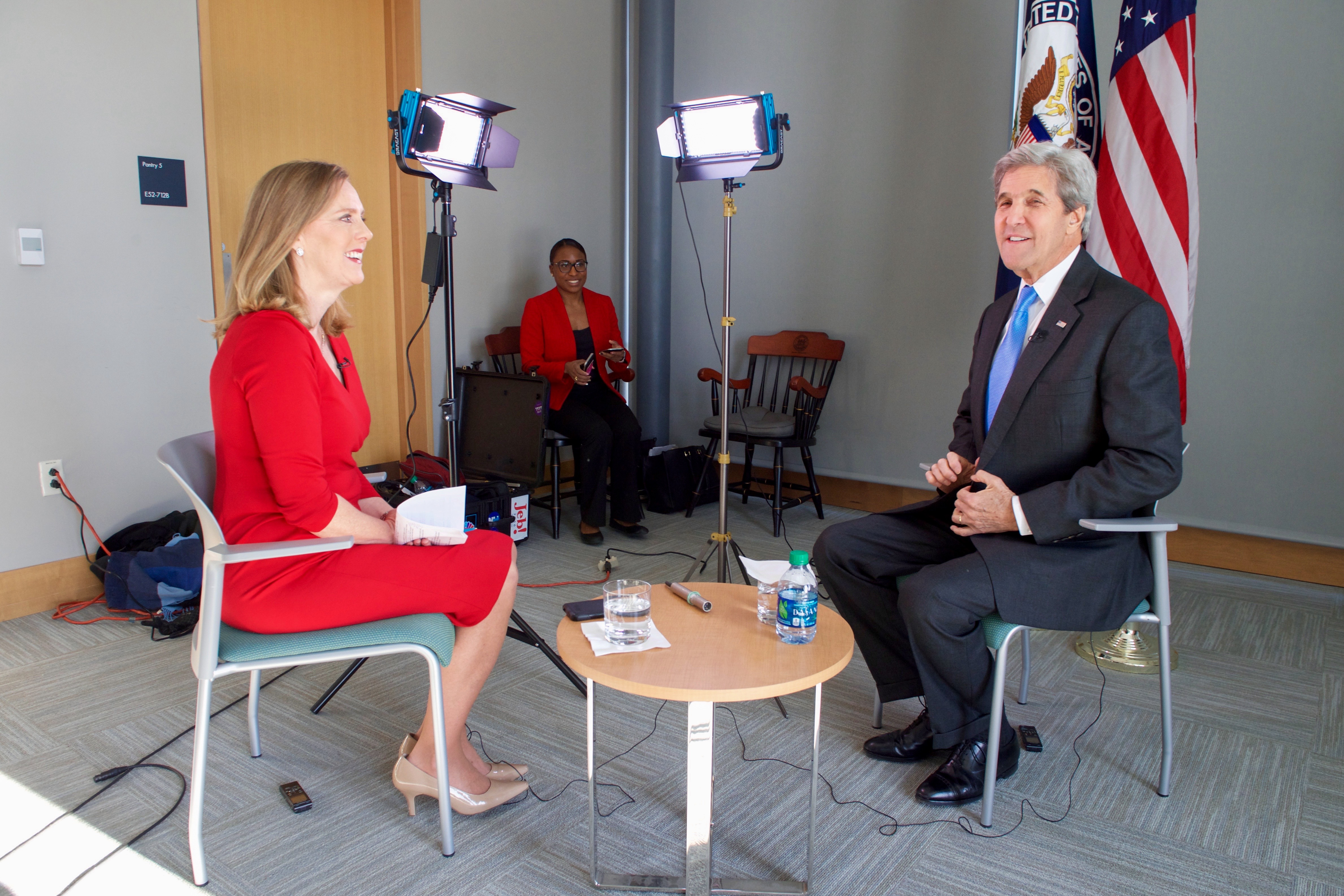
NBC Boston reporter Alison King interviews John Kerry in January 2017

Analysts described NBC's move as a gamble given the ratings strength of WHDH and the need to educate viewers on where NBC programming could be seen, particularly given that there was no one channel to promote. Promotion ahead of the launch included audio and transit advertising as well as pop-up events where news anchors handed out hot chocolate at shopping centers. The station was rebranded as NBC10 Boston at the start of 2018, emphasizing its cable channel number.

=== Another signal switch ===
The broadcast incentive auction held later in 2017 led to further changes as a number of Boston-area television stations sold their spectrum and agreed to share channels with other broadcasters. Among these stations was WMFP, which entered into a channel sharing agreement with WWDP, whose signal is marginal in Boston and other areas to the north.

On October 18, 2017, NBC agreed to purchase WYCN-CD, a Nashua, New Hampshire–based Class A station that had also sold its spectrum in the auction. Prior to the sale, WYCN-CD owner OTA Broadcasting entered into a channel sharing agreement with the WGBH Educational Foundation to broadcast WYCN-CD on the transmitter of WGBX-TV, a full-power Boston signal. The sale of WYCN-CD to NBC was completed on January 18, 2018; the station began channel-sharing with WGBX the same day. The WMFP simulcast ended at midnight on April 1, 2018; WMFP began channel sharing with WWDP on September 7. The feed on WYCN-CD was assigned major channel number 15. (Note: The WGBX-TV signal overlaps with WGME (virtual channel 13, physical channel 15) in Portland, Maine, thus the use of 15.)

On August 8, 2019, WBTS-LD (channel 8) and WYCN-CD swapped call signs, with channel 8 becoming WYCN-LD and channel 15 changing to WBTS-CD. On August 31, 2019, WYCN-LD left the air in advance of its October 2019 transmitter move to Norton, Massachusetts, and city of license change to Providence, Rhode Island.

=== Studio move to Needham ===
NBCUniversal announced in March 2017 that it would vacate the Newton property and build a new facility for its Boston operation—NBC Boston, WNEU, NECN, and CSN New England (now NBC Sports Boston)—in a former General Dynamics plant in Needham. The regional sports network had previously been located in separate facilities from the broadcast stations and NECN. The 160,000-square-foot (15,000 m^{2}), $125 million NBCU Boston Media Center opened in February 2020.

== News operation ==
As a programming strategy, that just mystifies me. If you have four McDonald's on the block, why would you want to build another one?

— Alan Schroeder, professor of journalism, Northeastern University, on the format of NBC10 Boston's news

Concurrent with the launch, NBC Boston debuted a full suite of local newscasts. Early reviews found the news effort to be competitive with Boston's established local TV newsrooms but noted that the style was more in line with traditional major-market network affiliates than the flashy approach characteristic of WHDH. Shirley Leung, writing in The Boston Globe, concluded that NBC Boston "isn't an innovator", citing former Boston news directors and journalism professors. Former WBZ-TV news director Matt Ellis described NBC Boston's news as "much more on your side than in your face". The staff consisted of a blend of new hires, younger than anchors at other stations, and existing NECN talent, as well as Pete Bouchard and Phil Lipof, previously of WCVB. To the existing resources of NECN and WNEU, NBC added approximately 80 employees, new vehicles for weather coverage, and a leased helicopter. A second former WCVB anchor, J. C. Monahan, left that station to join NBC Boston in July 2017.

A year after the switch and launch, NBC10 Boston and WHDH were trending in opposite directions in the ratings. WHDH had largely maintained its news audience, including first- and second-place finishes in the morning and at 5 and 6 p.m. Meanwhile, NBC10 frequently ranked as the weakest out of Boston's five news-producing stations, though marquee fall network programming provided an improvement in the second half of 2017. One reason for the poor performance was loyalty to existing stations in the Boston market.

== Technical information and subchannels ==
WGBX-TV and WBTS-CD transmit using WGBX-TV's spectrum from a tower on Cedar Street in Needham, Massachusetts. The stations' signals are multiplexed:

Subchannels of WGBX-TV and WBTS-CD
License	Subchannel	Res.	Short name	Programming
WGBX-TV	2.2	480i	World	World
WGBX-TV	2.3	480i	WGBH-SD	PBS (WGBH-TV)
WGBX-TV	44.2	480i	WGBX-SD	PBS
WGBX-TV	44.3	480i	Create	Create
WGBX-TV	44.4	480i	Kids	PBS Kids
WBTS-CD	15.1	1080i	WBTS-CD	NBC
WBTS-CD	15.2	480i	Cozi	Cozi TV

Simulcast of subchannels of another station

The NBC subchannel is offered in ATSC 3.0 (NextGen TV) format from the transmitter of WUNI.
