= Channel 10 digital TV stations in the United States =

The following television stations broadcast on digital channel 10 in the United States:

- K10AC-D in Ashland, Montana
- K10AD-D in Vallecito, Colorado
- K10AH-D in Emigrant, Montana
- K10AP-D in Pateros/Mansfield, Washington
- K10AW-D in Challis, Idaho
- K10BA-D in Orondo, etc., Washington
- K10BD-D in Winthrop-Twisp, Washington
- K10BK-D in Big Sandy, Montana
- K10BU-D in Lund & Preston, Nevada
- K10CG-D in Aztec, New Mexico
- K10DK-D in Malott/Wakefield, Washington
- K10DL-D in Tonasket, Washington
- K10DM-D in Riverside, Washington
- K10FC-D in Dodson, Montana
- K10FQ-D in Big Laramie, etc., Wyoming
- K10GF-D in Miles City, Montana
- K10GT-D in Mina/Luning, Nevada
- K10HL-D in Virginia City, Montana
- K10HO-D in Big Piney, etc., Wyoming
- K10IX-D in Newberry Springs, California, on virtual channel 2, which rebroadcasts KCBS-TV
- K10JK-D in Hinsdale, Montana
- K10JW-D in Verdigre, Nebraska
- K10KG-D in Tenakee Springs, Alaska
- K10KH-D in Shageluk, Alaska
- K10KM-D in Cape Girardeau, Missouri
- K10KR-D in Coolin, Idaho
- K10LG-D in Dryden, Washington
- K10LH-D in West Glacier, etc., Montana
- K10LJ-D in Galena, Alaska
- K10LM-D in Laketown, etc., Utah, on virtual channel 4, which rebroadcasts KTVX
- K10LQ-D in Manhattan, Nevada
- K10LU-D in Nightmute, Alaska
- K10MA-D in Waunita Hot Springs, Colorado, on virtual channel 9
- K10MG-D in Socorro, New Mexico
- K10MZ-D in Dolores, Colorado
- K10NC-D in Kenai, etc., Alaska
- K10NF-D in Halfway, Oregon
- K10NY-D in Ismay Canyon, Colorado
- K10OD-D in Weber Canyon, Colorado
- K10OG-D in Lompoc, California
- K10PM-D in Breckenridge, Colorado, on virtual channel 10
- K10PN-D in Cedar City, etc., Utah, on virtual channel 13, which rebroadcasts KSTU
- K10PR-D in Thomasville, Colorado
- K10PS-D in Pine Ridge, South Dakota
- K10PV-D in Santa Barbara, California
- K10PW-D in Gallup, New Mexico
- K10QH-D in Trout Creek, etc., Montana
- K10QJ-D in Mink Creek, Idaho, on virtual channel 8, which rebroadcasts KIFI-TV
- K10QL-D in Abilene, Texas
- K10QR-D in Leamington, Utah
- K10QX-D in Reno, Nevada
- K10QZ-D in Rosebud, etc., Montana
- K10RA-D in Coulee City, Washington
- K10RB-D in Mesa, Colorado
- K10RC-D in Denton, Montana
- K10RF-D in Long Valley Junction, Utah
- K10RG-D in Rural Juab County, Utah
- K10RH-D in Salina & Redmond, Utah
- K10RI-D in Marysvale, Utah
- K10RJ-D in Woodland & Kamas, Utah
- K10RK-D in Blanding/Monticello, Utah
- K10RL-D in East Price, Utah, on virtual channel 7, which rebroadcasts KUED
- K10RN-D in Helper, Utah
- K10RO-D in Roosevelt, etc., Utah, on virtual channel 7, which rebroadcasts KUED
- K10RP-D in Santa Clara, Utah, on virtual channel 2, which rebroadcasts KUTV
- K10RS-D in Aspen, Colorado
- K10RT-D in Beaumont, Texas
- K10RU-D in Salinas, California
- K10RV-D in Centerville, Washington
- K10RW-D in Lake Havasu, Arizona
- KAKE in Wichita, Kansas
- KBIM-TV in Roswell, New Mexico
- KBRR in Thief River Falls, Minnesota
- KBSL-DT in Goodland, Kansas
- KCHF in Santa Fe, New Mexico
- KENV-DT in Elko, Nevada
- KERO-TV in Bakersfield, California
- KETZ in El Dorado, Arkansas
- KFDA-TV in Amarillo, Texas
- KFNE in Riverton, Wyoming
- KGBY-LD in Palm Springs, California
- KGTV in San Diego, California, on virtual channel 10
- KHDT-LD in Denver, Colorado, on virtual channel 26
- KHLM-LD in Houston, Texas, on virtual channel 12
- KHPK-LD in De Soto, Texas, on virtual channel 28
- KIIO-LD in Los Angeles, California, on virtual channel 10
- KLFY-TV in Lafayette, Louisiana
- KMCA-LD in Redding, California
- KMEB in Wailuku, Hawaii
- KMHC in Steamboat Springs, Colorado, on virtual channel 24
- KMOT in Minot, North Dakota
- KNIN-TV in Caldwell, Idaho
- KOLN in Lincoln, Nebraska
- KOLR in Springfield, Missouri
- KOPB-TV in Portland, Oregon, on virtual channel 10
- KQME in Lead, South Dakota
- KRVD-LD in Banning, California
- KSAA-LD in San Antonio, Texas
- KSAZ-TV in Phoenix, Arizona, on virtual channel 10
- KTOO-TV in Juneau, Alaska
- KTSD-TV in Pierre, South Dakota
- KTTC in Rochester, Minnesota
- KTUU-TV in Anchorage, Alaska
- KTVL in Medford, Oregon
- KTVQ in Billings, Montana
- KUVM-LD in Houston, Texas, uses KHLM-LD's spectrum, on virtual channel 10
- KWCM-TV in Appleton, Minnesota, on virtual channel 10
- KWHS-LD in Colorado Springs, Colorado
- KWSU-TV in Pullman, Washington
- KWTX-TV in Waco, Texas
- KXNU-LD in Laredo, Texas
- KXTV in Sacramento, California, on virtual channel 10
- KZSW-LD in Riverside, California, on virtual channel 10
- KZTV in Corpus Christi, Texas
- W10AD-D in Montreat, North Carolina, on virtual channel 7, which rebroadcasts WSPA-TV
- W10AJ-D in Greenville, South Carolina, on virtual channel 7, which rebroadcasts WSPA-TV
- W10AK-D in Spruce Pine, North Carolina, on virtual channel 4, which rebroadcasts WYFF
- W10AL-D in Cherokee, etc., North Carolina
- W10BG-D in Mayaguez, Puerto Rico, on virtual channel 5, which rebroadcasts W05CY-D
- W10CP-D in Towanda, Pennsylvania
- W10DD-D in San Juan, Puerto Rico, on virtual channel 44
- W10DF-D in Canton, etc., North Carolina
- W10DG-D in Evansville, Indiana
- WALB in Albany, Georgia
- WBIQ in Birmingham, Alabama
- WBIR-TV in Knoxville, Tennessee
- WBUP in Ishpeming, Michigan
- WCTI-TV in New Bern, North Carolina
- WCTX in New Haven, Connecticut, uses WTNH's spectrum, on virtual channel 59
- WDIO-DT in Duluth, Minnesota
- WDIQ in Dozier, Alabama
- WFSF-LD in Key West, Florida, on virtual channel 10
- WGEM-TV in Quincy, Illinois
- WGOM-LD in Panama City, Florida
- WHEC-TV in Rochester, New York
- WHTM-TV in Harrisburg, Pennsylvania
- WILX-TV in Onondaga, Michigan
- WIRP-LD in Raleigh, North Carolina, on virtual channel 27
- WIS in Columbia, South Carolina
- WJXX in Orange Park, Florida
- WLYH in Red Lion, Pennsylvania, uses WHTM-TV's spectrum
- WMED-TV in Calais, Maine
- WMEM-TV in Presque Isle, Maine
- WMFP in Foxborough, Massachusetts, uses WWDP's spectrum, on virtual channel 62
- WMVS (DRT) in Milwaukee, Wisconsin, on virtual channel 10
- WOIO in Shaker Heights, Ohio, on virtual channel 19
- WOWK-TV in Huntington, West Virginia
- WPLG in Miami, Florida, on virtual channel 10
- WSJT-LD in Atlantic City, New Jersey, on virtual channel 15
- WSMV-TV in Nashville, Tennessee, on virtual channel 4
- WTHI-TV in Terre Haute, Indiana
- WTNH in New Haven, Connecticut, on virtual channel 8
- WTSP in St. Petersburg, Florida, on virtual channel 10
- WTTD-LD in Hampton, Virginia
- WTVK in Oswego, Illinois
- WUAB in Lorain, Ohio, uses WOIO's spectrum, on virtual channel 43
- WVER in Rutland, Vermont
- WVFX in Clarksburg, West Virginia
- WVUX-LD in Fairmont, West Virginia
- WWBT in Richmond, Virginia
- WWCI-CD in Vero Beach, Florida
- WWDP in Norwell, Massachusetts, on virtual channel 46
- WWUP-TV in Sault Ste. Marie, Michigan
- WXIA-TV in Atlanta, Georgia, on virtual channel 11
- WYGN-LD in Berrien Springs, Michigan

The following television stations, which are no longer licensed, formerly broadcast on digital channel 10 in the United States:

- K10AF-D in Troy, Montana
- K10BB-D in Ardenvoir, Washington
- K10KB-D in Austin, Nevada
- K10LD-D in Dillingham, Alaska
- K10PL-D in Victoria, Texas
- K10RM-D in Kingman, Arizona
- KBNB-LD in San Antonio, Texas
- KNEE-LD in Malaga, etc., Washington
- KRDJ-LD in Lubbock, Texas
- WNXY-LD in New York, New York
- WVTA in Windsor, Vermont
- WXFL-LD in Florence, etc., Alabama
