= Bid on the City =

Real estate auction website

Bid on the City (BidOnTheCity.com), launched in New York City in April 2009, is the first live online real estate auction site to use real time video and audio streaming. Inspired by Rita Yanovitsky, Licensed Auctioneer. The firm was co-founded by Albert Feinstein and Vlad Sapozhnikov with more than $3,000,000 of initial investment. Currently, it operates in New York City, Westchester, the Hamptons, Florida, London, England, and Moscow (Russia).

Bid on the City hosts live online bidding. with audio and video of each auction allowing people to bid live online and via mobile phones.

The site was launched in May 2009 with Manhattan properties for sale, and was described by CNBC as eBay for Manhattan real estate. On May 25, the first live online auction for Manhattan real estate was held . In March 2010, Bid on the City offered seasonal rental in the Hamptons, New York using "Dutch" auctions also known as reverse auction. A technique was developed to place bids from mobile phones as well as online. The auction was also broadcast live on Plum TV in the Hamptons. In May 2010, Bid on the City launched in Westchester, New York. One of the first properties listed on the site was a 7,223-square-foot (671.0 m^{2}) home in Chappaqua that was considered for purchase by Bill and Hillary Clinton as well as several Hollywood stars including Ben Stiller.

In November 2010, the firm expanded into Russia using the "Dutch" auction model. The company's equity partner in Russia is a media company, RBC, whose majority owner is Mikhail Prokhorov, the Russian billionaire who recently purchased the New Jersey Nets Their first live auction for Russian properties was held on December 11, 2010 at 226 Fifth Avenue . Over $6,600,000 of real estate was sold that day.

The firm launched the Miami, Florida branch of its website in April 2011.
