= KFWD =

Television station in Fort Worth, Texas

- Fort Worth–Dallas, Texas; United States
- City: Fort Worth, Texas
- Channels: Digital: 9 (VHF); Virtual: 52
- Branding: KFWD-TV52

Programming
- Affiliations: 52.1: Shop LC; for others, see § Subchannels

Ownership
- Owner: WRNN-TV Associates; (RNN National, LLC)

History
- First air date: September 1, 1988
- Former channel numbers: Analog: 52 (UHF, 1988–2009); Digital: 51 (UHF, 2002–2009)
- Former affiliations: Telemundo (1988–2002); Independent (2002–2012, 2020–2021); MundoFox (2012–2015); MundoMax (2015–2016); SonLife (2016–2020); ShopHQ (2021–2024)
- Call sign meaning: Fort Worth–Dallas

Technical information
- Licensing authority: FCC
- Facility ID: 29015
- ERP: 26 kW
- HAAT: 546.3 m (1,792 ft)
- Transmitter coordinates: 32°35′20″N 96°58′5.9″W

Links
- Public license information: Public file; LMS

KFWD (channel 52) is a television station licensed to Fort Worth, Texas, United States, serving the Dallas–Fort Worth metroplex. Owned by WRNN-TV Associates, it airs programming from Shop LC. KFWD's offices are located in Coppell, and its transmitter is located in Cedar Hill, Texas.

== History ==
=== As a Telemundo affiliate ===
The station first signed on the air on September 1, 1988; it first operated as the Dallas–Fort Worth market's original affiliate of the Spanish-language network Telemundo. The KFWD call letters were previously used by a local radio station on 102.1 FM (now KDGE). For much of its history with the network, KFWD signed off the air during the overnight hours each night; as a result, the station did not carry the entire Telemundo network schedule, whose overnight lineup (as is the case to this day) consisted of infomercials produced and dubbed in Spanish as well as feature films from countries with a predominant population of Spanish speakers such as Mexico. The station began broadcasting 24 hours a day in late 2000.

KFWD lost its affiliation with the network when NBC, which had recently acquired Telemundo, bought independent station KXTX-TV (channel 39) from the Christian Broadcasting Network in 2001. During KFWD's final month as a Telemundo affiliate, the station aired English-language infomercials during the morning and overnight hours.

=== As an independent station ===
On January 1, 2002, KFWD became an English-language general entertainment independent station. It acquired syndicated programs displaced by both KXTX and KSTR-TV (channel 49) when both stations affiliated with Spanish-language networks on that date—KXTX having joined Telemundo, while KSTR joined TeleFutura (including programs such as Real TV and Access Hollywood). The station also began carrying live sporting events including the Big 12 men's basketball tournament, as well as FC Dallas and Dallas Sidekicks soccer games that were dropped from KLDT (channel 55, now MeTV affiliate KAZD).

Belo Corporation began managing the station in 2006, providing advertising sales assistance, certain technical services and facilities to support the operations of KFWD; Belo's flagship ABC affiliate WFAA (channel 8, now owned by Tegna) also supplied the station with repurposed editions of its newscasts (consisting of simulcasts of its Monday–Saturday 6 p.m., Sunday–Friday 10 p.m. and Sunday 5:30 p.m. newscasts) and other programs seen on that station (such as The Dr. Oz Show). Belo also operated KFWD.tv, the station's website, using a website platform similar to that used by Belo's other stations. The management agreement included an option to purchase KFWD and create a duopoly with WFAA; this option was never exercised.

KFWD has been digital-only since June 12, 2009.

On October 17, 2011, KFWD changed its programming format, placing a strong emphasis on classic television series. The new "Classic TV" logo and branding was first unveiled on the station's YouTube channel on August 3, 2011, and later on KFWD's Facebook page on October 7. It was then rolled out to the station's website one month later.

=== Return to Spanish ===
On June 11, 2012, HIC Broadcast, Inc. announced that KFWD would revert to a Spanish-language format as a charter affiliate of MundoFox (a joint venture between Fox International Channels and RCN Television); it switched to the network when MundoFox "soft launched" on select affiliates on August 1, 2012, at 6 a.m. local time (the network's formal launch date was on August 13). As a result, Belo terminated its management agreement with HIC Broadcast, Inc. to operate KFWD. The last program to air on KFWD as an English-language independent was The Shepherd's Chapel at 5 a.m. on August 1 (despite being an English-language program, The Shepherd's Chapel returned to KFWD's schedule one month later). There was no formal on-air announcement of the programming change, except for a message posted on KFWD's Facebook page reading "it has been a pleasure".

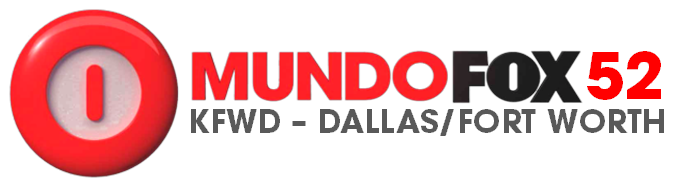
logo as MundoFox affiliate

Many of the programs formerly seen on KFWD during its classic television format now air on MeTV (whose original local affiliate KTXD-TV (channel 47), joined the network shortly before KFWD's format change; KTXD continues to carry some of these programs as an independent station whereas KTXA's second digital subchannel recovered the MeTV affiliation), and on Antenna TV (which is affiliated with the second digital subchannel of CW affiliate KDAF (channel 33)).

On July 27, 2015, MundoFox was rebranded as MundoMax after 21st Century Fox sold its stake in the network to RCN, giving it full ownership. The full name change and logo overhaul occurred August 13, which coincided with the network's third anniversary.

=== Sale to NRJ TV; switch to Sonlife ===
On October 26, 2015, HIC Broadcast, Inc. filed an application to sell KFWD to NRJ TV DFW License Co., LLC, a subsidiary of NRJ Holdings LLC. Sale was approved by the FCC on December 15, 2015 and completed on January 8, 2016. On September 1, 2016, KFWD switched to being an affiliate of the Sonlife Broadcasting Network at approximately 12 a.m. CT. Like the previous transition, there was no announcement of the programming change, except on SonLife's website. In fact, around the time of the affiliation switchover, KFWD was just starting to run an infomercial at its scheduled time. After a few seconds, the abrupt change from MundoMax to Sonlife began, months before MundoMax went off the air on November 30.

There had been rumors that KFWD would be sold by NRJ in a spectrum auction.

=== Sale to WRNN-TV Associates ===
On December 9, 2019, it was announced that WRNN-TV Associates, owner of New York City–based WRNN-TV, secured a deal to purchase seven full-power TV stations (including KFWD) and one Class A station from NRJ. The sale was approved by the FCC on January 23, and was completed on February 4, 2020.

From February 1 until February 4, 2020, WRNN-TV Associates operated KFWD under a short-term local marketing agreement (LMA) while it awaited full consummation of its purchase. KFWD dropped its affiliation with the Sonlife Broadcasting Network, and began airing WRNN-TV's independent network RNN on its primary channel. RNN's schedule consisted primarily of infomercials, with occasional religious, E/I, and news/talk (Richard French Live) programs.

Later, KFWD reinstated the Sonlife Broadcasting Network affiliation on subchannel 52.3.

On May 20, 2021, RNN and iMedia Brands announced an agreement to affiliate most of RNN's television stations (including KFWD) with home shopping network ShopHQ. KFWD began carrying ShopHQ programming on June 28, 2021. RNN's educational/informational programming and Richard French Live continues to air, but in different timeslots than before and retooled from its previous investigative news format.

Beginning in 2024, WRNN's station group switched affiliations again, this time to Shop LC while keeping its primary home shopping format.

== Technical information ==
=== Subchannels ===
The station's signal is multiplexed:

Subchannels of KFWD
Subchannel	Res.	Short name	Programming
52.1	720p	KFWD HD	Shop LC
52.2	480i	QVC365	QVC 365
52.3	480i	SonLife	SonLife
52.4	480i	Crossin	The Asian Channel
52.5	480i	JTV	Jewelry TV
52.6	480i	JTV ESP	Jewelry TV Español
52.7	480i	KFWD.7	[Blank]
52.8	480i	KFWD.8	Infomercials
52.9	480i	ShopLC	Simulcast of 52.1
52.17	480i	ShopLC2	Simulcast of 52.1

Prior to becoming a MundoFox affiliate, KFWD carried a standard definition simulcast of its main channel on digital subchannel 52.2.

=== Analog-to-digital conversion ===
KFWD began transmitting a digital television signal in standard definition on UHF channel 51 on May 1, 2002, five months after it converted into an independent station. After KFWD shut down its analog signal on June 12, 2009, its digital signal moved to VHF channel 9, formerly WFAA's digital channel spot.
