= WMDE =

Television station in Dover, Delaware

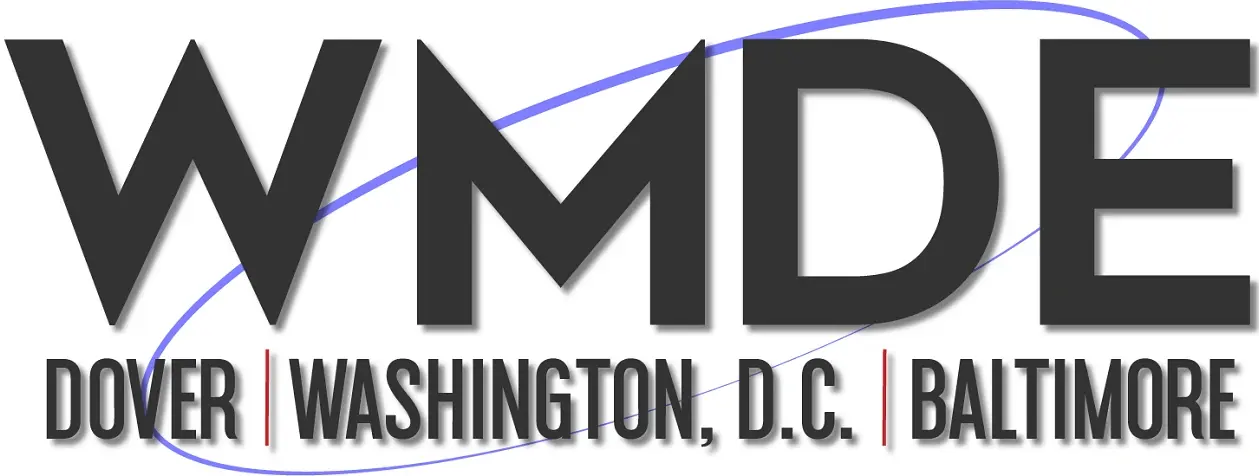
- Dover, Delaware; Salisbury–Baltimore, Maryland; Washington, D.C.; United States
- City: Dover, Delaware
- Channels: Digital: 5 (VHF); Virtual: 36
- Branding: WMDE 36

Programming
- Affiliations: 36.1: Shop LC; for others, see § Subchannels

Ownership
- Owner: WRNN-TV Associates Limited Partnership; (RNN D.C. License Co., LLC)

History
- Founded: May 4, 2011
- First air date: May 24, 2013
- Former affiliations: Soul of the South Network; Newsmax TV; Doctor TV; ShopHQ
- Call sign meaning: Washington (D.C.), Maryland, and Delaware

Technical information
- Licensing authority: FCC
- Facility ID: 189357
- ERP: 10 kW
- HAAT: 145 m (476 ft)
- Transmitter coordinates: 38°57′17.3″N 76°5′34.8″W

Links
- Public license information: Public file; LMS
- Website: www.wmdetv.com

WMDE (channel 36) is a television station licensed to Dover, Delaware, United States. Owned by WRNN-TV Associates, the station maintains a transmitter in the unincorporated community of Wye Mills in Talbot County, Maryland, 41 miles (66 km) southwest of Dover along Maryland's Eastern Shore. Despite its physical location well east of the center of the market and across the Chesapeake Bay, the station is assigned by Nielsen to the Washington, D.C., television market, though its over-the-air coverage outside most of Delaware itself mainly favors Baltimore, Annapolis, and Salisbury. With the repeal of the Federal Communications Commission (FCC)'s Main Studio Rule in 2019, WMDE is fully automated out of WRNN-TV's studios in Rye Brook, New York, with no local presence whatsoever.

Outside of a morning rebroadcast of the Japanese network Fuji TV's News Catch program, the station's schedule on its main channel is made up of home shopping programming from Shop LC, which also airs on the main channel of all of WRNN's stations.

== History ==
WMDE signed on May 24, 2013. The station was originally owned by Western Pacific Broadcast LLC.

Shortly after sign-on, Nielsen granted WMDE's request to be assigned to the Washington market instead of Philadelphia (where Dover is located) or Baltimore (where Wye Mills is located). Because WMDE is a full-powered station covered by must-carry regulations, it is thus carried on every cable and satellite provider in the Washington market, with the exception of Cox Communications' systems in Fairfax County, Virginia. Cox filed a complaint to the Federal Communications Commission seeking to avoid carriage and prevailed in 2015. Although the FCC's ruling called Nielsen's market modification decision "inexplicable", must-carry rules otherwise defer to Nielsen with respect to market assignment.

WRNN-TV Associates agreed to acquire the station for $11.5 million on April 25, 2018; the sale was completed on July 11, 2018.

== Subchannels ==
The station's signal is multiplexed:

Subchannels of WMDE
Subchannel	Res.	Short name	Programming
36.1	720p	WMDE.1	Shop LC
36.2	720p	WMDE.2	[Blank]
36.3	480i	WMDE.3	[Blank]
36.4	480i	QVC365	QVC 365 (4:3)
36.5	480i	The365	365BLK
36.6	480i	Outlaw	Outlaw
36.7	480i	Arirang	Arirang TV
36.8	480i	ShopLC	Shop LC
36.9	480i	CRTV	CRTV (infomercials)
36.12	480i	ShopLC2	Shop LC

Subchannel broadcast with MPEG-4 video
