= WMCN-TV =

Television station in Princeton, New Jersey

- Princeton, New Jersey; Philadelphia, Pennsylvania; United States
- City: Princeton, New Jersey
- Channels: Digital: 13 (VHF), shared with WHYY-TV; Virtual: 44
- Branding: WMCN44

Programming
- Affiliations: 44.1: Infomercials; for others, see § Subchannels

Ownership
- Owner: WRNN-TV Associates; (RNN Philly License Co., LLC)
- Sister stations: WTVE, WPHY-CD

History
- First air date: July 29, 1981 (Note: Originally licensed to Atlantic City, New Jersey; moved to Princeton in 2018.)
- Former call signs: WWAC-TV (1981–2003)
- Former channel numbers: Analog: 53 (UHF, 1981–2002); Digital: 44 (UHF, 2002–2018), 12 (VHF, 2018–2020)
- Former affiliations: Independent (1981–2021); ShopHQ (2021–2023); Shop LC (2023–2024)
- Call sign meaning: Market Connect Network

Technical information
- Licensing authority: FCC
- Facility ID: 9739
- ERP: 30 kW
- HAAT: 294 m (965 ft)
- Transmitter coordinates: 40°2′30.9″N 75°14′21.9″W

Links
- Public license information: Public file; LMS
- Website: www.rnntv.com/wmcn-tv/

WMCN-TV (channel 44) is a television station licensed to Princeton, New Jersey, United States, serving the Philadelphia area and primarily airing paid programming. It is owned by WRNN-TV Associates alongside Willow Grove, Pennsylvania–licensed WTVE (channel 51) and Trenton, New Jersey–licensed Class A station WPHY-CD (channel 25). WMCN-TV's studios are located on Dobbs Lane in Cherry Hill, New Jersey. Through a channel sharing agreement with PBS member station WHYY-TV (channel 12), WMCN-TV transmits using WHYY-TV's spectrum from an antenna in the Roxborough section of Philadelphia.

== History ==
The station first signed on the air on July 29, 1981, as WWAC-TV, originally licensed to Atlantic City, New Jersey, and broadcasting on UHF channel 53. It used the 1980 song "Night Train" by Steve Winwood as background music during station identifications. It went off the air in 1982. The station changed its callsign to WMCN-TV in 2003. In 2009, the station was rebranded as "Get It On TV Philadelphia" to reflect its focus on the entire Philadelphia market, not just Atlantic City. Most of the station's programming consisted of infomercials, many of which were produced by WMCN for local businesses. The remainder of WMCN's schedule was filled with several hours per week of regional faith-based telecasts as well as children's and community interest programming.

In 2011, WMCN obtained rights to broadcast games from the Arena Football League's Philadelphia Soul, broadcasting a majority of their regular season games on the station.

In 2012, the station was once again rebranded as "WMCN44", signaling a shift towards a more traditional independent station. WMCN also added several syndicated programs to its schedule, including Cold Case Files, Dog the Bounty Hunter and Punk'd. On September 10 of that year, WMCN announced that it would produce three new original weekly series: A New View, an issues-oriented show hosted by former WTXF-TV (channel 29) personality Dawn Stensland, Tolly's Awesome Friends, a series centered on noteworthy locals hosted by ex-WTXF sports director Don Tollefson, and Philly Sports Spotlight, a locally focused series hosted by former WPVI-TV (channel 6) sports anchor Phil Andrews.

On December 4, 2014, the WMCN-TV license was assigned from Lenfest Broadcasting, LLC to WMCN License Holdings, LLC, which had exactly the same ownership structure as Lenfest.

In the fall of 2016, WMCN added programming from Newsmax TV during the 4–6 p.m. and 8–9 p.m. hours, as well as nightly broadcasts of the Cowtown Rodeo and motorsports newsmagazine Raceline TV, plus the weekly Ring of Honor Wrestling series.

In the Federal Communications Commission (FCC)'s incentive auction, WMCN-TV sold its spectrum for $63,144,027 and indicated that it would enter into a post-auction channel sharing agreement. On July 14, 2017, NRJ TV, owner of WPHY-CD, agreed to purchase WMCN for $6 million; on July 24, 2017, it assigned its right to acquire the station to WRNN-TV Associates in a deal not filed with the FCC until December. On February 14, 2018, WMCN entered into a channel sharing agreement with PBS member station WHYY-TV (channel 12); as the WHYY-TV signal does not reach Atlantic City, WMCN has changed its city of license to Princeton, New Jersey.

As a result of the 2017 RNN acquisition, WMCN began simulcasting the programming of its parent company's primary station, New York-based WRNN, thus extending its coverage into the Delaware Valley.

On May 20, 2021, RNN and iMedia Brands announced an agreement to affiliate most of RNN's television stations (including WMCN) with home shopping network ShopHQ. WMCN began carrying ShopHQ programming on June 28, 2021.

On August 25, 2023, WMCN ceased carrying ShopHQ and replaced it with Shop LC. On July 1, 2024, WMCN replaced Shop LC with infomercials.

== Technical information ==
=== Subchannels ===
WHYY-TV and WMCN-TV broadcast from a transmitter facility in the Roxborough section of Philadelphia.

Subchannels of WHYY-TV and WMCN-TV
License	Subchannel	Res.	Short name	Programming
WHYY-TV	12.1	1080i	WHYY	PBS
WHYY-TV	12.2	480i	WHYY2	Y2 (5 a.m.–5 p.m.); World (5 p.m.–5 a.m.)
WHYY-TV	12.3	480i	YKids	PBS Kids
WMCN-TV	44.1	720p	WMCN-TV	Infomercials
WMCN-TV	44.2	480i	The 365	365BLK (4:3)
WMCN-TV	44.3	480i	Outlaw	Outlaw (4:3)
WMCN-TV	44.4	480i	MovGold	MovieSphere Gold (4:3)

On August 22, 2011, WMCN announced that it would carry Bounce TV on digital subchannel 44.2 starting on September 26, 2011.

On December 15, 2014, WMCN-TV lost its affiliation with Bounce TV; sub-channel 44.2 was temporarily replaced with SMPTE color bars. Just over two weeks later, on December 31, Soul of the South Network took over the frequency.

=== Analog-to-digital conversion ===
WMCN discontinued regular programming on its analog signal, over UHF channel 53, in October 2002. The station's digital signal began operating on UHF channel 44, instead of its former UHF analog channel 53, which was among the high band UHF channels (52–69) that were removed from broadcasting use as a result of the digital television transition in 2009. WMCN was the first television station in the United States to receive permission from the FCC to discontinue its analog signal. The move to digital channel 44 was intended to provide better signal coverage of the Philadelphia market from a new transmitter location which would qualify for must-carry status on cable television in the metropolitan area.
