= WWDP =

Television station in Norwell, Massachusetts

- Norwell–Boston, Massachusetts; United States
- City: Norwell, Massachusetts
- Channels: Digital: 10 (VHF), shared with WMFP; Virtual: 46
- Branding: WWDP Television

Programming
- Affiliations: 46.1: Roar; for others, see § Subchannels

Ownership
- Owner: WRNN-TV Associates Limited Partnership; (RNN Boston License Co., LLC)
- Sister stations: WMFP

History
- First air date: December 6, 1986
- Former call signs: WRYT (1986–1988); WHRC (1988–1998); WBPX (1998–1999)
- Former channel number: Analog: 46 (UHF, 1986–2009)
- Former affiliations: Independent (1986–1989); Dark (1989–1996); inTV (1996–1998); Pax TV (1998–1999); Infomercials (1999–2000); Telemundo (2000–2002, as satellite of WTMU-LP); ACN (2002–2003); ShopHQ (2003−2019, 2021–2024); Shop LC (2019−2021); QVC (2024); Binge TV (2024–2025)
- Call sign meaning: Devon Paxson (former owner)

Technical information
- Licensing authority: FCC
- Facility ID: 23671
- ERP: 5 kW
- HAAT: 142 m (466 ft)
- Transmitter coordinates: 42°0′38″N 71°2′40″W

Links
- Public license information: Public file; LMS
- Website: www.rnntv.com/content/wwdp-tv

WWDP (channel 46) is a television station licensed to Norwell, Massachusetts, United States, serving the Boston area as an affiliate of the digital multicast network Roar. It is owned by WRNN-TV Associates alongside Foxborough-licensed WMFP (channel 62). Through a channel sharing agreement, the two stations transmit using WWDP's spectrum from a tower off Pleasant Street in West Bridgewater. WWDP's studios are located on Bert Drive, also in West Bridgewater.

Channel 46 had a precarious existence from its sign-on in 1986 until a decade later, including more than seven years off the air between 1989 and 1996. It was the first Boston-area home for Pax before Pax bought the stronger channel 68. Since, it has largely been leased out or used to air home shopping programming.

== History ==
=== Early years ===
The station first signed on the air on December 6, 1986, as WRYT, operating as an independent station from a bare-bones facility in Hanover. Owned by Robert Howe, a cable system owner from Alton, Illinois, WRYT operated from a tiny 300-foot (91 m) tower originally designed for use as a translator. It broadcast at only 6,000 watts—the minimum transmitter power for a full-power station. All of the equipment—two tape decks, a mixer, a primitive character generator, a satellite receiver and an Emergency Broadcast System unit—was located in an old video store bathroom. Most of the programs were multicultural, from the International Satellite Network.

The station changed its call sign to WHRC on February 4, 1988, exchanging with another of Howe's broadcast properties, a radio station in Edwardsville, Illinois. Two months later, it began broadcasting from a considerably improved broadcast facility in Brockton. Its 952,000-watt effective radiated power gave it fairly decent coverage of the southern fringe of Greater Boston, and it had also managed to get carriage on cable throughout the market. However, the antenna was somewhat heavier than normal, and the owners feared that the tower could not handle the weight of ice buildup should winter weather hit the area. As a result, the station was forced to go off the air in November while a new site was found.

In January 1989, WHRC returned to the air from a transmitter in Foxborough, with considerably reduced power (at 501,000 watts). However, the site was not wired for three-phase power, as is usually the case with television transmitters. WHRC was forced to make do with diesel power, which was totally inadequate for a television transmitter. Two of the transmitter's three diesel generators had failed by the spring of 1989, leaving WHRC unable to broadcast in color for half of the time. The station had never been on solid financial ground, and the technical problems only hampered matters further.

By June, the owner, a California resident, was going through a divorce, which complicated his efforts to keep the station going. He stopped paying syndication distributors, the diesel fuel supplier and other creditors, and the employees' paychecks started to bounce. The station was put on the market, but there were no credible buyers. Finally, in September, the diesel fuel supplier refused to deliver any more fuel to power the transmitter facility. As a result, the station abruptly went off the air at 1:13 p.m. on September 19, 1989, when the last remaining diesel generator ran out of fuel. At the time, many of the employees had not been paid for eight weeks.

Attempts to use channel 46 were periodically made in the next several years, but the tower situation loomed over any and all potential users. In 1990, Steve Mindich, owner of the weekly Boston Phoenix newspaper, reached a deal to buy WHRC through his Rogue Television Corporation. Mindich planned to rename the station WPHX and also held a tentative deal to buy the silent WNHT in Concord, New Hampshire; the stations were to be affiliates of the planned Star Television Network, airing classic TV shows.

Mindich's deal, however, came undone because he could not secure a tower, a necessity if the station were to improve its facilities. In late 1991, another deal was struck to sell the station to Two if by Sea Broadcasting Corporation, headed by Michael Parker of Easton, Pennsylvania, who owned WTVE in Reading.

In 1995, Parker proposed the construction of a 1,049-foot (320 m) tower in Bridgewater. The idea drew the ire of local residents. The planning board in Bridgewater denied the project, prompting Parker to sue.

=== Pax and shopping ===
Parker's Massachusetts Redevelopment sold the WHRC license to Christian Network Inc., for $15 million in October 1996. On December 18, 1996, WHRC broadcast for the first time in more than seven years; it first aired religious programming before shifting to home shopping in June 1997. Paxson Communications took control of 58.3 percent of the station's airtime under a seven-year local marketing agreement effective January 16, 1997; the company's founder, Lowell "Bud" Paxson, was also a co-founder and backer of Christian Network.

On January 13, 1998, WHRC changed its call letters to WBPX, in anticipation of the pending launch of Pax TV. It also added the local program Norwell News. That May, WBPX—by then an affiliate of Paxson's all-infomercial inTV network—was sold to DP Media (owned by Devon Paxson, son of Lowell Paxson) for $18 million; all of DP's stations were inTV affiliates that were to join Pax TV upon its August launch. WBPX was one of two Pax affiliates in the Boston market, along with Paxson Communications-owned WPXB (channel 60) in Merrimack, New Hampshire.

In May 1999, WBPX was put up for sale after Devon Paxson agreed to buy Boston University's independent station, WABU (channel 68), and move Pax programming there. That June, channel 46 returned to an infomercial-based format as WWDP; channel 68 would subsequently take on the WBPX call sign. While the bulk of the DP Media stations were acquired by Paxson Communications in late 1999 in a deal worth up to $173 million, WWDP was instead transferred to Norwell Television LLC. Paxson Communications owned 32 percent of Norwell Television's equity, but the new company was otherwise controlled by Roslyck Paxson and Devon Paxson.

In June 2000, Telemundo announced that WWDP would become an affiliate of the Spanish-language network that September. The station operated under a local marketing agreement with existing Telemundo affiliate WTMU-LP, with the two stations simulcasting. On July 1, 2002, WWDP dropped Telemundo, which remained on WTMU-LP, and returned to home shopping programming, affiliating with America's Collectibles Network.

Devon Paxson again placed WWDP on the market in late 2001. In September 2002, WPXB was purchased from Paxson Communications by NBC with the intention of switching it from ShopNBC—a home shopping service partly owned by NBC—to NBC-owned Telemundo. ShopNBC's parent company, ValueVision Media, announced in January 2003 that it would purchase WWDP from Norwell Television to maintain the service's distribution in the Boston market after channel 60—renamed WNEU—joined Telemundo in April. ShopNBC was renamed ShopHQ in 2013 and Evine Live—which had replaced ValueVision Media as its corporate name in November 2014—in 2015.

In December 2008, WWDP received authorization by the Federal Communications Commission to temporarily shut down its digital signal, to allow the station to install a new antenna for the transmitter. Although the mandated date for full-power television stations to convert to digital-only broadcasts was postponed from February 17, 2009, to June 12, WWDP was able to activate its digital signal on February 17 as Providence, Rhode Island–based WJAR discontinued its analog signal on channel 10 on the original transition date. WWDP shut down its analog signal, over UHF channel 46, in April 2009. The station moved its digital signal from its pre-transition UHF channel 52, which was among the high band UHF channels (52-69) that were removed from broadcasting use as a result of the transition, to VHF channel 10, using virtual channel 46.

On August 28, 2017, Evine Live agreed to sell WWDP to WRNN-TV Associates for $10 million; the station concurrently entered into a channel sharing agreement to allow NRJ TV, owner of WMFP (channel 62), to operate WMFP on one-third of WWDP's spectrum. The sale was completed on December 6, 2017. Evine changed its name back to ShopHQ in 2019.

On May 20, 2021, RNN and iMedia Brands announced an agreement to affiliate most of RNN's television stations (including WWDP) with ShopHQ. Following RNN's acquisition of the station, WWDP had moved ShopHQ to its .2 subchannel, with Shop LC on its primary channel. On June 28, 2021, ShopHQ returned to WWDP's primary channel, and all Shop LC programming was dropped.

WWDP had a construction permit to move to UHF channel 36 from the WBZ-TV tower in Needham; this permit was canceled in January 2026.

== Subchannels ==
Subchannels of WWDP and WMFP
License	Subchannel	Res.	Short name	Programming
WWDP	46.1	1080i	WWDP-DT	Roar
WWDP	46.2	480i	THE 365	365BLK
WWDP	46.3	480i	OUTLAW	Outlaw
WWDP	46.4	480i	ShopLC	Shop LC (4:3)
WWDP	46.5	480i	QVC365	QVC 365
WWDP	46.6	480i	HRTLAND	[Blank]
WMFP	62.1	720p	WMFP-DT	Shop LC
WMFP	62.2	480i	SBN	SonLife (4:3)
WMFP	62.3	480i	MeTOONS	MeTV Toons

== See also ==
- Channel 10 digital TV stations in the United States
- Channel 46 virtual TV stations in the United States
- List of United States over-the-air television networks#Shopping networks
- List of television stations in Massachusetts
