= WPHY =

WPHY may refer to:

- WPHY-CD, a low-power television station (channel 23, virtual 25) licensed to Trenton, New Jersey, United States
- WNJE, a radio station (920 AM) licensed to Trenton, New Jersey, which held the call sign WPHY from 2002 to 2008
- WFIL, a radio station (560 AM) licensed to Philadelphia, Pennsylvania, United States, which held the call sign WPHY from 1993 to 1994
