= WMFP =

Television station in Foxborough, Massachusetts

- Foxborough–Boston, Massachusetts; United States
- City: Foxborough, Massachusetts
- Channels: Digital: 10 (VHF), shared with WWDP; Virtual: 62
- Branding: WMFP

Programming
- Affiliations: 62.1: Shop LC; 62.2: SonLife; 62.3: MeTV Toons

Ownership
- Owner: WRNN-TV Associates; (RNN National, LLC)
- Sister stations: WWDP

History
- First air date: October 16, 1987 (Note: Originally licensed to Lawrence, Massachusetts; moved to Foxborough in 2018.)
- Former channel numbers: Analog: 62 (UHF, 1987–2009); Digital: 18 (UHF, 2006–2018)
- Former affiliations: Independent (1987–1995); NBC (secondary, 1993–1995); Shop at Home (1995–2007); JTV (secondary, 2006–2007); Infomercials (2007–2009, 2019–2021); Gems TV (secondary, 2007–2008); RTN (2009–2011); MeTV (2011–2012); Plum TV (2012–2013); Cozi TV (2013–2016); Sonlife (2016–2019); NBC (60.5, via WBTS-LD, 2017–2018); Shop LC (2021–2022); TBD (2022–2025)
- Call sign meaning: "We're Media for the People"

Technical information
- Licensing authority: FCC
- Facility ID: 41436
- ERP: 5 kW
- HAAT: 142 m (466 ft)
- Transmitter coordinates: 42°0′38″N 71°2′40″W

Links
- Public license information: Public file; LMS

WMFP (channel 62) is a television station licensed to Foxborough, Massachusetts, United States, serving the Boston area as an affiliate of Shop LC. It is owned by WRNN-TV Associates alongside Norwell-licensed WWDP (channel 46). Through a channel sharing agreement, the two stations transmit using WWDP's spectrum from a tower off Pleasant Street in West Bridgewater. WMFP's studios are located on Lakeland Park Drive in Peabody.

== History ==
=== 1987–1995 ===
The station first signed on the air on October 16, 1987, on UHF channel 62, originally licensed to Lawrence, Massachusetts. Initially, the station broadcast approximately eight hours per day of programming, operating its transmitter from a hill behind the Baldpate Hospital in Georgetown, Massachusetts. The early programming was primarily home shopping. WMFP was originally owned by MFP, Inc.; the company's largest shareholder was Boston-area political commentator Avi Nelson, who owned 35% of the station and also served as its president, treasurer, and secretary.

In September 1992, a new broadcast antenna was mounted, via a Sikorsky sky-crane helicopter, on top of One Beacon Street in Boston. WMFP installed its new transmitter on an upper floor of the building, and started broadcasting from Boston in November 1992. In addition to Avi Nelson, Bill Mockbee, well known in Boston radio and television broadcasting, was the general manager; composer/conductor/actor David Morrow was the operations manager; and Jim Capillo served as production manager, producing several local programs for the station. WMFP also expanded to a 24-hour schedule, with programming including syndicated talk shows, game shows, low budget movies, and drama shows. In early 1993, the station picked up several NBC programs that were not cleared by then-affiliate WBZ-TV (channel 4), including Later.

In May 1994, Nelson agreed to sell WMFP to the Shop at Home Network for $7 million. Shop at Home announced—even before an affiliation swap moved the NBC affiliation to WHDH-TV—that it would not retain the secondary NBC affiliation. The sale closed in 1995.

=== 2006–2015 ===
On May 16, 2006, Shop at Home's parent, the E. W. Scripps Company, announced that the network would suspend operations, effective June 22. However, Shop at Home temporarily ceased operations one day early than said target date on June 21, WMFP then switched to Jewelry Television (and, on June 23, to a mixture of both networks). On September 26, 2006, Scripps announced that it would sell its Shop at Home stations, including WMFP, to New York City-based Multicultural Television for $170 million. The sale of WMFP was finalized on April 24, 2007. Before the sale announcement, the station entered into discussions to affiliate with MyNetworkTV (a broadcast network created by News Corporation as a competitor to The CW, both of which launched in September 2006). MyNetworkTV instead chose to affiliate with WZMY-TV (channel 50, now WWJE-DT).

In May 2007, Multicultural took over WMFP, and switched the station to a mix of infomercials and home shopping network Gems TV; the Gems TV affiliation was dropped a year later. On May 12, 2009, it was announced that WMFP would affiliate with Retro Television Network (RTN). RTN programming was added to the station's second digital subchannel on May 20, though with its station identification showing the channel as 18.1. The next day, WMFP began showing RTN content on the main channel as well (RTN was subsequently rebranded as RTV).

After Multicultural ran into financial problems and defaulted on its loans, WMFP was placed into a trust; in 2011, the station, along with KCNS in San Francisco, was sold to NRJ TV (a company unrelated to European broadcaster NRJ Radio). The sale was consummated on May 13, 2011. NRJ TV affiliated the station with MeTV on December 15, 2011, moving RTV to the second subchannel exclusively.

On October 1, 2012, WMFP switched its primary channel affiliation to lifestyle network Plum TV; WCVB-TV (channel 5) assumed the MeTV affiliation for the Boston market on that date as part of a group affiliation deal with that station's owner Hearst Television. On or around May 13, 2013, WMFP became affiliated with Cozi TV on its main channel. In June 2013, the station briefly added a secondary feed of Cozi TV on digital subchannel 62.3 (which aired Cozi TV programming without the infomercial preemptions seen on digital channel 62.1, but presented in a horizontally compressed picture format).

By November 2014, WMFP's lineup placed Cozi TV on both 62.1 and 62.2 (with 62.2 airing Cozi TV without interruption), VIETV on 62.3, and MGM-owned The Works on 62.4. In January 2015, VIETV was dropped and The Works was moved to subchannel 62.3.

=== 2016–2019 ===
On June 1, 2016, 62.1 changed over to programming from the Sonlife Broadcasting Network, the religious network owned by television minister Jimmy Swaggart. On June 8, 2016, subchannel 62.2 (Cozi TV) was dropped when NBCUniversal, Cozi TV's parent company, moved its programming to a new third subchannel of Telemundo O&O WNEU (channel 60).

On December 12, 2016, NBC announced an agreement with WMFP to temporarily lease one of their subchannels to provide a full-market signal for the low-power WBTS-LD (channel 8, now WYCN-LD), which became Boston's new NBC station on January 1, 2017, under the branding of "NBC Boston". The subchannel used WNEU's virtual channel 60, mapping to 60.5 in order to avert confusion with any of WMFP's subchannels and help over-the-air viewers determine if WNEU-DT2 or WMFP-DT5 provided a better signal source for their home. The WMFP-DT5 simulcast of "NBC Boston" was scaled to 720p (rather than being presented in its native 1080i) resolution, likely due to WMFP having both bandwidth limitations and its transmission facilities not being upgraded yet to allow a multiplexed signal with two HD subchannels.

WMFP sold its frequency rights as part of the Federal Communications Commission (FCC)'s 2017 spectrum auction for $93,647,708; in the auction, the station indicated that it would continue operations through a channel sharing agreement. In August 2017, WMFP entered into a channel sharing agreement with WWDP, whose signal does not cover the entire market (and is marginal in Boston proper) due to its VHF channel, short transmitter tower height and location 25 miles (40 km) south of Boston. As WWDP's signal does not reach Lawrence, WMFP's city of license has changed to Foxborough. WMFP originally intended to commence channel sharing with WWDP on April 23, 2018; on April 3, the station requested special temporary authority to continue operating its existing transmitter through July 23, as one of the multichannel video programming distributors that carries WMFP did not receive an adequate signal from WWDP; the request was granted on April 6. WMFP began channel sharing with WWDP on September 7, 2018.

Ahead of commencing channel sharing operations, WMFP eliminated its non-primary subchannels in April 2018. WBTS-LD's simulcast on WMFP ended at midnight on April 1, 2018; several months earlier, NBC purchased Nashua, New Hampshire–based WYCN-CD (channel 15, now WBTS-CD) and entered into a channel-sharing agreement with the WGBH Educational Foundation to carry that signal over WGBX-TV (channel 44) to serve as the new full market home of "NBC Boston". The elimination of the subchannels temporarily left the Boston area without an affiliate of either Comet or Charge!; however, on July 25, 2018, CBS Television Stations relaunched Comet (formerly seen on 62.4) in this market as a newly-created third digital subchannel of MyNetworkTV affiliate WSBK-TV (channel 38), and on January 15, 2019, CBS added Charge! (formerly seen on 62.3) onto WSBK's newly-created fourth digital subchannel, thereby restoring this market's access to all the services that were lost as a result of the reallocation of WMFP's spectrum.

=== 2019–present ===
On December 9, 2019, it was announced that WRNN-TV Associates, owner of New York City-based WRNN-TV, secured a deal to purchase seven full-power TV stations (including WMFP) and one Class A station from NRJ. The sale was completed on February 4, 2020, creating a duopoly with WWDP. Following the sale, SonLife programming was moved to a reactivated 62.2 subchannel, with WMFP's main 62.1 channel broadcasting infomercials and a simulcast of WRNN's nightly talk show Richard French Live.

Upon the start of WRNN's agreement to convert nearly all of their main-channel network affiliations to ShopHQ and discontinue all original programming, WMFP began to carry Shop LC full-time on its own main channel at the start of July 2021. It switched to OnTV4U, a full-time paid programming network, in January 2024.

On December 31, 2024, WMFP changed its primary network affiliation to TBD, a comedy multicast network owned by Sinclair Broadcast Group.

== Technical information ==
=== Subchannels ===
Subchannels of WWDP and WMFP
License	Channel	Res.	Short name	Programming
WWDP	46.1	1080i	WWDP-DT	Roar
WWDP	46.2	480i	THE 365	365BLK
WWDP	46.3	480i	OUTLAW	Outlaw
WWDP	46.4	480i	ShopLC	Shop LC (4:3)
WWDP	46.5	480i	WWDP.5	[Blank]
WWDP	46.6	480i	WWDP.6	[Blank]
WMFP	62.1	720p	WMFP-DT	Shop LC
WMFP	62.2	480i	SBN	SonLife (4:3)
WMFP	62.3	480i	MeTOONS	MeTV Toons

=== Analog-to-digital conversion ===
WMFP shut down its analog signal, over UHF channel 62, on February 17, 2009, the original date on which full-power television stations in the United States were to transition from analog to digital broadcasts under federal mandate. The station's digital signal continued to broadcasts on its pre-transition UHF channel 18, using virtual channel 62.
