= WRNN-TV =

Television station in New Rochelle, New York

- New Rochelle–New York, New York; United States
- City: New Rochelle, New York (Note: Originally licensed to Kingston, New York; moved to New Rochelle in 2018.)
- Channels: Digital: 25 (UHF), shared with WWOR-TV; Virtual: 48
- Branding: RNN

Programming
- Affiliations: 48.1: Shop LC; for others, see § Subchannels

Ownership
- Owner: WRNN-TV Associates; (WRNN License Company, LLC)

History
- Founded: December 22, 1983
- First air date: December 15, 1985
- Former call signs: WTZA (1985–1995)
- Former channel numbers: Analog: 62 (UHF, 1985–2004); Digital: 48 (UHF, until 2018)
- Former affiliations: Independent (1985–2021); ShopHQ (2021–2023)
- Call sign meaning: Regional News Network

Technical information
- Licensing authority: FCC
- Facility ID: 74156
- ERP: 57.8 kW
- HAAT: 520 m (1,706 ft)
- Transmitter coordinates: 40°42′46.8″N 74°0′47.3″W

Links
- Public license information: Public file; LMS
- Website: www.rnntv.com/wrnn-tv/

WRNN-TV (channel 48) is a television station licensed to New Rochelle, New York, United States, serving the New York City area as an affiliate of Shop LC. It serves as the flagship station and namesake of Rye Brook–based WRNN-TV Associates; its studio facilities and headquarters are co-located on Westchester Avenue in Rye Brook. Through a channel sharing agreement with WWOR-TV (channel 9), WRNN-TV transmits using WWOR-TV's spectrum from a tower atop One World Trade Center.

== History ==
=== W62AA ===
Channel 62 was first used in the New York metropolitan area by W62AA, which was founded in 1970 by Screen Gems Broadcasting, a sub-division of Columbia Pictures as a translator for then independent station WNJU-TV (channel 47). It was one of the many translator stations serving the entire New York City area. By 1975, WNJU-TV and most of the major stations in New York had moved their transmitters to the World Trade Center, but W62AA remained at the Empire State Building to expand its signal farther north of the city and the surrounding area. With the introduction of the cell phone developed by Bell Labs in 1982, all upper band channels were scheduled to be displaced for cell phone use. But before that happened, WNJU-TV expanded its signal farther north, making W62AA obsolete as a backup. W62AA was taken off the air in 1983; that year, a construction permit for a full-power television station in Kingston, New York, was issued to a group led by Albany-area businessman Edward Swyer. It would be two years before the channel 62 allocation would be used again.

=== As WTZA ===
Channel 62 returned to the air from Kingston on December 15, 1985, as WTZA. It was formatted as an independent station serving the Mid-Hudson region of New York State. However, by virtue of the outer range of its signal, WTZA also served the Capital District, and the northern suburbs of New York City. The call letters designated the coverage area, and also served as the station's slogan—"From the Tappan Zee to Albany". The Mid-Hudson Valley area was one of the largest in the country to lack its own television station, this due to its proximity to both the New York and Albany–Schenectady–Troy television markets.

Owned by Swyer's group, which by then had changed its name to WTZA-TV Associates, WTZA was programmed as a traditional independent station, with movies, off-network reruns, children's shows, and public affairs programs filling its airtime. Sports programming was also included, mostly high school and college contests, and later Army football games. The station also ran a small news operation, led by former CNN executive producer Gerry Harrington, which was relatively successful given the underserved nature of its coverage area. The weather portion of the newscast gave full forecasts for both New York City and Albany, even though the station was not on the air in either city.

Though WTZA was still doing well in its market, the station had begun to struggle prior to the sale due to the station being shut out of obtaining rights to many syndicated programs by larger stations in New York City and Albany. Being licensed within the New York City market did not help the station's cause either, and in the early 1990s WTZA lost most of its higher-profile syndicated programs as the New York City outlets claimed territorial rights. In 1993, Swyer and his group sold the station to Harrison, New York, businessman Richard French Jr. French soon made WTZA into a family-run operation, with his wife and three sons involved in various aspects of the station. His oldest son, Richard French III, was appointed as WTZA's general manager and would eventually become the face of the station.

=== Transition to WRNN and targeting New York City ===
In early 1995, most of WTZA's remaining general entertainment programs were replaced with infomercials. In October 1995, the call letters were changed to WRNN-TV, and the station shifted into a news-heavy operation. With the new call sign also doubling as the on-air slogan–Your Regional News Network, WRNN initially produced news programming seven days a week, and 24 hours a day on weekdays. Its coverage area now included the entire Hudson Valley region, and news bureaus were established in the Capital District and Long Island, within New York state, and in the neighboring states of New Jersey and Connecticut. The news product, however, was tilted with a lean towards the French family's home base of Westchester County, and a philosophical shift to the left. Richard French III, WRNN's general manager, news director, and host of a nightly call-in talk program, had been active in the New York state Democratic party prior to his father's purchase of WTZA. The station was an affiliate of All News Channel and used stories from that service to augment its national coverage.

Budgetary concerns led to a reduction of news programming in 1999, to weekday evenings only. But WRNN decided the time had come for the station to target New York City, the first time a station on channel 62 served the entire New York City area since W62AA left the air in 1983, albeit this time for cable subscribers. The bureaus in New Jersey and Connecticut were also closed down. Soon thereafter, the operation placed a greater emphasis on New York City news than there had been before, in spite of WRNN's invisible profile within the Five Boroughs. The over-the-air channel 62 signal barely reached the Bronx, the city's northernmost borough, and neither of the city's major cable systems (operated by the predecessors of today's Spectrum and Optimum) carried the station. WRNN opened a studio in Manhattan and was successful in getting its evening news shows simulcast on a low-power station there, though it was mostly an effort to gain must-carry coverage on local cable.

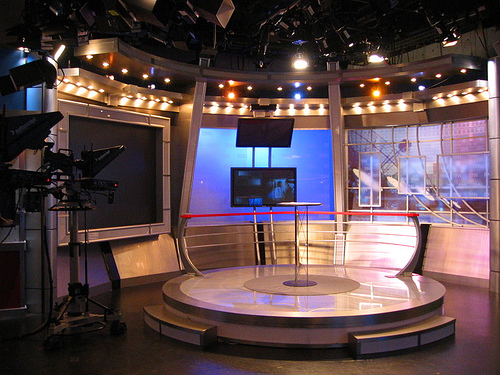
The RNN talk set, used for nightly programming, located in Rye Brook, July 2006.

The shift towards New York City resulted in decreased coverage for its main signal area–for example, WRNN's weather forecasts did not include areas north of Kingston, the station's city of license. Oddly enough, the station applied for must-carry in the entire Albany market several years after the station stopped covering the area outside politics. Within about two years, the simulcast in New York City was gone. It would take a few more years before WRNN would appear on New York City cable, and as part of satellite provider DirecTV's local station package. WRNN opened a new main studio facility in the village of Rye Brook in 2005, though it has retained its facilities in Kingston and Manhattan.

Over the years, WRNN's news offerings have fluctuated. By February 2017, the station aired a combination of regional and international news, including Richard French Live, and Newsline, the English-language newscast of Japanese public broadcaster NHK. In June 2009, WRNN began producing news programming for FiOS1, a news channel that is carried by Verizon Fios systems in the region. In August 2019, Verizon announced that it would not renew its contract with RNN to produce the network's news programming; as a result, FiOS1 ceased operations on November 13, 2019, two days earlier than originally planned.

=== Spectrum sale; channel sharing agreement ===
In the Federal Communications Commission (FCC)'s spectrum incentive auction, WRNN's broadcast spectrum was sold for $212 million—one of the highest, publicly announced sale prices in the process. The station's owner claimed that it would continue to "broadcast from someone else's tower location before the end of the auction transition period".

On February 16, 2018, in a FCC filing, WRNN stated that it had entered into a channel sharing agreement with Fox Television Stations and its Secaucus, New Jersey–licensed WWOR-TV (channel 9). As WWOR's signal does not sufficiently reach Kingston, WRNN has changed its city of license to New Rochelle, New York. WRNN began channel-sharing with WWOR on May 1, 2018.

=== ShopHQ affiliate ===
On May 20, 2021, RNN and iMedia Brands announced an agreement to affiliate most of RNN's television stations (including WRNN) with home shopping network ShopHQ. WRNN began carrying ShopHQ programming on June 28, 2021. Richard French Live aired its final episode, in its original news analysis format, on May 28, 2021. French stated the decision was his own and that he "can't continue to give the time that this program and the viewer deserve," though without mention of the ShopHQ agreement that would now overlay the station's entire broadcast day. A reformatted version of Richard French Live, a combination of segments featuring progressive radio personalities Thom Hartmann, Stephanie Miller and others and pre-recorded commentary from French continues to air on WRNN, allowing the station to meet the FCC's minimum requirement for public affairs programming.

iMedia Brands filed for Chapter 11 bankruptcy on June 28, 2023. On July 10, 2023, iMedia announced that it would sell its assets, including ShopHQ, to RNN Media Group for $50 million; the deal was terminated in August in favor of a $55 million bid for ShopHQ by IV Brands, owned by Manoj Bhargava.

=== Shop LC affiliate ===
Beginning in 2024, WRNN's station group switched affiliations again, this time to Shop LC while keeping its primary home shopping format.

== Past programming ==
=== Newscenter Now ===
In January 2007, it was announced that WRNN and The Journal News would partner to create a two-hour "daily in-depth newscast" titled Newscenter Now beginning in mid-March 2007. The newscast was broadcast from WRNN's Rye Brook studios and aired weeknights from 5 to 7 p.m. Its main anchors were Christa Lauri, Andrew Whitman, Stacy Ann Gooden and Ben Sosenko.

Newscenter Now was dropped after the September 27, 2008, broadcast; it was replaced with syndicated programming and the locally produced Real Politics Live. The Newscenter Now name was also used on a half-hour-long newscast targeted to Long Island, which has since been dropped from its schedule.

=== Sports ===
WTZA used to air competitions of local college sports teams. It previously aired Army football before Army signed a television contract with ESPN to put all its games there (aside from the Army–Navy Game, which airs on CBS). It also previously aired Hudson Valley Renegades minor league baseball home games and Manhattan College basketball games. WTZA was additionally the broadcaster of all Marist College basketball home games from 1986 to 1995. Brian Kenny was the play-by-play announcer during this time.

=== Notable former on-air staff ===
- Kevin Connors
- Nancy Cozean
- Brian Kenny
- Rolland Smith
- Hillary Van Benschoten

== Technical information ==
=== Subchannels ===
Subchannels of WWOR-TV and WRNN-TV
License	Subchannel	Res.	Short name	Programming
WWOR-TV	9.1	720p	WWOR-TV	Main WWOR-TV programming
WWOR-TV	9.3	480i	Buzzr	Buzzr
WWOR-TV	9.4	480i	Heroes	Heroes & Icons
WRNN-TV	48.1	720p	WRNN-HD	Shop LC
WRNN-TV	48.2	480i	ROAR	Roar
WRNN-TV	48.3	480i	The 365	365BLK
WRNN-TV	48.4	480i	Outlaw	Outlaw
WRNN-TV	48.5	480i	QVC2	QVC2

On March 6, 2007, WRNN agreed to an affiliation contract with the Funimation Channel, a network which broadcasts Japanese anime cartoons, to run its programming on digital subchannel 48.3. This affiliation ended in July 2009. As of August 2009, WRNN used its 48.2 subchannel to rebroadcast the English service of China Central Television, CCTV-9; by January 2010, it was switched to another China-based English-language network, Blue Ocean Network.

On March 1, 2010, digital channel 48.2 began carrying the Spanish-language network Mega TV. However, on August 1, 2011, WRNN dropped Mega TV and replaced it with the Qatar-based Al Jazeera English. One hour of local programming and station-provided E/I programming is scheduled in off periods to meet FCC guidelines. Al Jazeera English was removed on August 20, 2013, when it was pulled from US distribution due to the launch of Al Jazeera America. The channel then mirrored the programming of the primary WRNN channel.

On July 1, 2011, WRNN activated its fourth subchannel for Global Christian Network, a Christian-based religious television network which also aired on WEBR-CD (channels 17.1 and 17.3) in New York City. Despite the duplication in programming, each station technically serves a different market and are not commonly owned. GCN has been removed from the 4th slot and is not in use at present. In February 2012, WRNN activated its fifth subchannel to carry NHK World, the English language international broadcasting service of Japan's public broadcaster, NHK.

=== Analog-to-digital conversion ===
In 2004, the FCC opened an early digital conversion window for full-power UHF stations located between channels 52 and 69 in the analog UHF band, as long as the stations all met certain qualifying criteria. This portion of the television spectrum was slated to be reassigned to other communications purposes following the June 2009 transition. WRNN applied for FCC permission to shut off its analog signal on channel 62 and broadcast solely on its assigned digital frequency, UHF channel 48. The FCC granted the request on July 8, 2004, and WRNN's analog channel 62 went silent later that year. However, stations were required to have their virtual digital channel match the channel allocation assigned to their analog signal, using virtual channel 48.

The early analog shutoff authority was granted during a time when the full transition from analog to digital television had been tentatively scheduled for the end of 2006. Full-powered analog television broadcasts in the United States ended on June 12, 2009.

== Other stations owned by RNN ==
=== Current ===
Market	Station	Current Affiliation	Year acquired	Notes
Los Angeles	KSCI	Shop LC	2020	
San Francisco	KCNS	Shop LC	2020	
Washington, DC	WMDE	Shop LC	2018	Station is located in Dover, Delaware, but was assigned Washington DMA by Nielsen at the station's request.
Boston	WMFP	Shop LC	2020	
Boston	WWDP	Roar	2017	
Philadelphia	WMCN-TV	Shop LC	2017	
Philadelphia	WPHY-CD	Independent	2020	Majority of schedule consists of infomercials.
Philadelphia	WTVE	OnTV4U	2020	Majority of schedule consists of infomercials.
Dallas	KFWD	Shop LC	2020	
Houston	KUBE-TV	Shop LC	2020	

=== Former ===
Market	Station	Current affiliation	Year acquired	Year sold	Notes
Honolulu	KIKU	Multicultural Independent	2020	2022	Sold to Allen Media Broadcasting.
