= Plum TV =

American broadcast television channel

- Headquarters: New York, New York, U.S.

History
- Launched: 2004
- Closed: May 2013

Plum TV was an American broadcast television network targeted mostly to affluent viewers in the country. The majority of the programming was locally produced largely in affluent vacation communities, marketed towards the mass affluent.

== History ==
Plum TV was launched in 2004 by Tom Scott of Nantucket Nectars, film producer Cary Woods, Chris Glowacki, and general manager Brook Altman. Investors have included singer Jimmy Buffett, then-MTV head Tom Freston and Jason Flom.

On January 3, 2012, Plum TV, Inc. and a number of affiliated companies filed for chapter 11 bankruptcy protection in the Southern District of New York bankruptcy court. According to court filings, the companies projected losses of $8.4 million on revenues of $6.4 million and their liabilities exceeded their assets by over $10 million ($19 million in liabilities vs. $8.6 million in assets). They intended to sell their assets to PMG Media Group, LLC for $1 million in cash plus the assumption of certain obligations, subject to higher offers. In March 2012, Morgan Hertzan and Joseph Varet took over as co-presidents of Plum. Hertzan and Varet are former MTV executives and co-founders of LXTV.

In early October 2012, Plum TV received more funding, $4.4 million, from additional investors including Baroda Ventures and Double M Partners. Plum TV also added two Titan Broadcast Management stations, WMFP-TV in Boston and WTVE in Philadelphia, as affiliates in a move to go nationwide.

== Affiliates and programming ==
Plum TV was carried by cable providers in Aspen, Nantucket, the Hamptons, Martha's Vineyard, Telluride, Sun Valley, Vail, and Miami Beach. In the Boston metro area, Plum TV was available over the air on Channel 62.1 (WMFP), and in Philadelphia it was being broadcast on Channel 51.2 (WTVE). On the West Coast, Plum TV for a short time was seen on channel 56.4 (KDOC-TV). Plum programming focused on home and real estate, décor, food and wine, style, travel destinations, health and wellness.

== Awards and recognition ==
In November 2008, Plum TV was nominated for Six Emmy Awards by the National Academy of Television Arts and Sciences.

In June 2010, Plum TV received Emmy Award from Heartland Chapter of the National Academy of Television Arts & Sciences.

== See also ==
- Live Well Network, a similarly-themed television network, owned by Disney-ABC Television
