= KZSW-LD =

Television station in Riverside, California

- Riverside–Los Angeles, California; United States
- City: Riverside, California
- Channels: Digital: 10 (VHF); Virtual: 10

Programming
- Affiliations: 10.1: 3ABN; for others, see § Subchannels

Ownership
- Owner: Three Angels Broadcasting Network

History
- Founded: May 23, 1994
- Former call signs: K53DU (1994–2000); KHEM-LP (2000–2005)
- Former channel number: Analog: 27 (UHF)

Technical information
- Licensing authority: FCC
- Facility ID: 168217
- Class: LD
- ERP: 3 kW
- HAAT: 501.5 m (1,645 ft)
- Transmitter coordinates: 33°57′38″N 117°16′46″W

Links
- Public license information: LMS
- Website: www.3abn.org

KZSW-LD (channel 10) is a low-power religious television station licensed to Riverside, California, United States, serving the Los Angeles area as an owned and operated station of 3ABN.

== History ==
KZSW began as K53DU, a 100-watt low-power television station on channel 53 in Hemet, California. The station was founded by Ray Wilson of Buffalo Communications, and in 1995, it was sold to Victor and LaVerta Page. The station's power was then upgraded to 2.3 kW ERP, along with a call sign change to KHEM-LP. In 2000, the station applied for displacement relief from the FCC and was granted a channel change to channel 27, with a licensed power of 9.99 kW ERP. The station ran exclusively religious programming until April 2004, when it launched the Neighborhood Newsroom, a half-hour local news program that focused on the daily happenings in Hemet and San Jacinto.

In 2005 the station moved its studios to Temecula and adopted a traditional commercial programming format with morning and evening local newscasts. In 2006, ownership of the station was transferred to KZSW Television, Inc. The next year, KZSW slashed positions and ditched live newscasts in favor of taped programs. It routinely faced difficulties getting on local cable systems, such as Time Warner Cable.

In 2008, José Aquino, a Mexican-American businessman, signed contracts with the Page family, which owned KZSW-LD television; the Page family rejected Aquino's proposal to convert the station to a Spanish-language format. In February 2009, the station affiliated with NewsNet in a bid to provide local news, weather, and sports coverage pertinent to the Inland Empire and Southern California. In 2009, the Pages sold the operating assets of the station, but not its license, to Michael Sterby, and it is believed that Aquino provided the funds for Sterby to buy the station and used NewsNet to operate it. This set off a series of lawsuits, sparked by the fact that the license was not sold. A source from Milenio newspaper in Mexico reported that Aquino created a new company, also using the KZSW name, with the intent of confusing advertisers. The Pages responded by claiming that their license had been usurped.

On March 22, 2011, Aquino attempted to place NewsNet in bankruptcy, a declaration thrown out six months later.

At some point, the news and local programming stopped, and KZSW began carrying all religious programming from 3ABN.

The station held a construction permit for digital facilities on VHF channel 10, licensed in Riverside, until 2015, when it built those facilities.

== Subchannels ==
The station's signal is multiplexed:

Subchannels of KZSW-LD
Channel	Res.	Short name	Programming
10.1	480i	KZSW	3ABN (4:3)
10.2	480i	3ABN-PR	3ABN Proclaim (4:3)
10.3	480i	3ABN-DD	3ABN Dare to Dream (4:3)
10.4	480i	3ABN-ES	3ABN Latino (4:3)
10.5	480i	3ABN-KD	3ABN Kids (4:3)
10.6	480i	3ABN-PH	3ABN Praise Him (4:3)
10.7	480i	3ABN-IL	3ABN International (4:3)
10.8	Audio only	3ABN-RD	3ABN Radio
10.9	Audio only	3ABN-RL	3ABN Radio Latino
10.10	Audio only	3ABN-MR	3ABN Music Radio
10.11	Audio only	Radio74	Radio 74
