= WPHY-CD =

Television station in Trenton, New Jersey

- Trenton, New Jersey; Philadelphia, Pennsylvania; United States
- City: Trenton, New Jersey
- Channels: Digital: 22 (UHF), shared with WTVE; Virtual: 25

Programming
- Affiliations: 25.1: Infomercials; for others, see § Subchannels

Ownership
- Owner: WRNN-TV Associates; (RNN National, LLC)
- Sister stations: WTVE, WMCN-TV

History
- First air date: May 3, 1993
- Former call signs: W25AW (1989–2012); W50DZ-D (January–November 2012)
- Former channel numbers: Analog: 25 (UHF, 1993–2012); Digital: 50 (UHF, 2011–2019)
- Former affiliations: All News Channel; CNN; America One; Youtoo America
- Call sign meaning: Philly

Technical information
- Licensing authority: FCC
- Facility ID: 74464
- Class: CD
- ERP: 15 kW
- HAAT: 351.9 m (1,155 ft)
- Transmitter coordinates: 40°2′30.1″N 75°14′10.1″W

Links
- Public license information: Public file; LMS

WPHY-CD (channel 25) is a low-power, Class A television station licensed to Trenton, New Jersey, United States, serving the Philadelphia area. It is owned by WRNN-TV Associates alongside Princeton, New Jersey–licensed Shop LC affiliate WMCN-TV (channel 44) and Willow Grove, Pennsylvania–licensed WTVE (channel 51). WPHY-CD and WTVE share studios on East State Street in Trenton; through a channel sharing agreement, the two stations transmit using WPHY-CD's spectrum from an antenna in the Roxborough section of Philadelphia (Trenton is part of the Philadelphia television market).

== History ==
The station first broadcast in May 3, 1993 on analog channel 25, and was originally assigned the call sign W25AW, though for much of its history it branded as "WZBN-TV 25", broadcasting news and local programming. The station's tower was located in Hamilton Township, Mercer County, New Jersey. The station's call sign became W50DZ-D in January 2012 after converting to digital broadcasting on channel 50; however, digital television receivers display the station's virtual channel 25.

The station has received several awards from the Community Broadcasters Association for local service and programming.

With the creation of a statewide and regional cable news service owned by the cable companies, cable outlets threatened to pull WZBN off their systems in the late 1990s. Protests by viewers ensured the station remained on cable. WZBN has since expanded its reach with additional broadcasts on three competing cable systems (Verizon Fios, Optimum, Comcast) in the area.

In 2012, the station's longtime owners, the Zanoni family, announced that they would sell W50DZ-D to NRJ TV LLC (a company unrelated to European broadcaster NRJ Radio), which already owned WTVE. The station's local programming was discontinued on June 8, 2012; the sale was completed a week later, on June 15, 2012.

On November 1, 2012, NRJ TV changed W50DZ-D's call sign to WPHY-CD. The WPHY call sign was previously used by two radio stations audible in the market; it was on 560 AM in Philadelphia for ten months in 1993–94, ending when that signal's heritage call sign WFIL became available and was reclaimed, and it was on 920 AM in Trenton from 2002 to 2008. In January 2014, Cablevision announced that it would drop WPHY from its Trenton-area systems on January 28 to accommodate a must-carry request from MeTV affiliate KJWP (channel 2); WPHY's former channel 25 slot on Cablevision was taken by WCBS-TV from New York City, which lost its previous channel 2 slot on the system to KJWP. In June 2016, the station began to carry Sonlife Broadcasting Network programming; it had previously been affiliated with Youtoo America.

On December 9, 2019, it was announced that WRNN-TV Associates, owner of New York City–based WRNN-TV, secured a deal to purchase seven full-power TV stations and one Class A station (including WPHY-CD) from NRJ. The sale was approved by the FCC on January 23, and was completed on February 4, 2020, and would make WTVE and WPHY-CD sister stations to WMCN-TV.

== Notable former staff ==
- Tracy Wolfson (now at CBS Sports)

== Subchannels ==
Subchannels of WPHY-CD and WTVE
License	Subchannel	Res.	Short name	Programming
WPHY-CD	25.1	480i	WPHY.1	Infomercials
WPHY-CD	25.2	480i	SBN	SonLife
WPHY-CD	25.3	480i	JTV	Jewelry TV
WPHY-CD	44.7	480i	SHOPLC	Shop LC
WTVE	51.1	720p	WTVE.1	Shop LC
WTVE	51.2	480i	INFO	MovieSphere Gold
WTVE	51.3	480i	ACE TV	Ace TV
WTVE	51.4	480i	QVC365	QVC 365
