= Pete Bouchard =

American meteorologist

Joseph Pierre Leon Bouchard II, known as Pete Bouchard, is the current chief meteorologist at NBC 10 Boston. He has been with them since they launched on January 1, 2017. Immediately prior, he worked at sister station New England Cable News, which he joined on January 11, 2016.

== Career ==
Bouchard began working at WVII-TV in 1994, he worked at WHDH in June 2002, before being promoted to chief meteorologist in 2005 when previous chief meteorologist Todd Gross left. Previously, he worked for WPXT in Portland, Maine, where he was chief meteorologist for four years, and before that as a weekend meteorologist for WFXT in Boston. He has also worked as a weekend meteorologist at Portland-based WGME-TV and WMTW.

== Controversies ==
During the 5:30 p.m. broadcast on January 18, 2010, Bouchard told what many believed to be an off-colored joke while giving updates on local snowfall totals. He said, "In Princeton, we picked up 9 inches of snow, Billerica had 7. The biggest amount that I could find...almost as big as me. About nine inches." He was standing in front of a bar graph where the measurement of 9 inches was equal to his height on the screen. The video went viral on the Internet. WHDH had the video taken off YouTube and it was explained as a technical error and that Bouchard was unaware of the way his comments could be misconstrued.

Regarding the splashdown of the March 2025 SpaceX mission to return NASA astronauts who were stuck in space, Bouchard commented on Facebook that "“I’m no conspiracy theorist, but that splashdown today had strong hints of AI enhancement in the drone footage". After receiving criticism from followers, Bouchard updated his post to say, “My original post was simply commenting on how visually appealing and perfect the landing looked using the drone. I was curious about the technology and the camera the crew used to capture the scene.”

== Awards and honors ==
Bouchard has been nominated twice for a New England Emmy for Best Weathercast. He won the Best of Boston award for Best Meteorologist in 2007, 2008, and 2010. He was named the Maine Association of Broadcasters Best Meteorologist in 2002, and also won an AP Award for Best Meteorologist in 2001.

== Education ==
Bouchard graduated from Lyndon State College (now Northern Vermont University-Lyndon) in Lyndon, Vermont in 1992 with a Bachelor's degree in meteorology.
