= WTVE =

Television station in Willow Grove, Pennsylvania

- Willow Grove–Philadelphia, Pennsylvania; United States
- City: Willow Grove, Pennsylvania
- Channels: Digital: 22 (UHF), shared with WPHY-CD; Virtual: 51
- Branding: TV 51

Programming
- Affiliations: 51.1: Shop LC; for others, see § Subchannels

Ownership
- Owner: WRNN-TV Associates; (RNN National, LLC)
- Sister stations: WPHY-CD, WMCN-TV

History
- First air date: May 4, 1980 (Note: Originally licensed to Reading, Pennsylvania; moved to Willow Grove in 2018.)
- Former channel numbers: Analog: 51 (UHF, 1980–2009); Digital: 25 (UHF, until 2018)
- Former affiliations: Independent (1980–1998, 2000–2016, 2020–2021); Telemundo (1998–2000); SonLife (2016–2020)

Technical information
- Licensing authority: FCC
- Facility ID: 55305
- ERP: 15 kW
- HAAT: 351.9 m (1,155 ft)
- Transmitter coordinates: 40°2′30.1″N 75°14′10.1″W

Links
- Public license information: Public file; LMS

WTVE (channel 51) is a television station licensed to Willow Grove, Pennsylvania, United States, serving the Philadelphia area with home shopping programming from Shop LC. It is owned by WRNN-TV Associates alongside Princeton, New Jersey–licensed station WMCN-TV (channel 44) and Trenton, New Jersey–licensed Class A station WPHY-CD (channel 25). WTVE and WPHY-CD share studios on East State Street in Trenton; through a channel sharing agreement, the two stations transmit using WPHY-CD's spectrum from an antenna in the Roxborough section of Philadelphia.

== History ==
The station first signed on the air on May 4, 1980, as an independent station, originally licensed to Reading, Pennsylvania. When it launched, WTVE initially maintained a general entertainment format with a mix of off-network sitcoms from the 1960s and early 1970s, movies, drama series and talk shows, as well as a local newscast. However, the station did not carry many cartoons. While the station received sizeable viewership, it was not profitable.

Beginning in September 1981, WTVE began running the subscription television service SelecTV, which aired feature films just finished with their theatrical runs, each evening from 8 to 10 p.m. By January 1982, SelecTV programming expanded to 8 p.m. to midnight. That spring, the station began running SelecTV from 7 p.m. to 5 a.m. on weekdays and from 3 p.m. to 5 a.m. on weekends. In the fall of 1982, WTVE added Financial News Network programming each weekday from noon to 5 p.m., and began carrying religious programs on Saturday and Sunday mornings. WTVE switched to SelecTV programming after 6 p.m. weekdays and after noon on weekends.

By the fall of 1983, WTVE was running SelecTV full-time, with the exception of weekday broadcasts of The 700 Club and the Independent Network News, along with other religious and public affairs shows on Saturday and Sunday mornings. SelecTV was dropped in the late 1980s, and was replaced with home shopping programming from Shop at Home and infomercials. In 1998, WTVE affiliated with the Spanish-language Telemundo network, before switching back to an English-language format after a year.

WTVE's primary analog transmitter (prior to the digital transition) was located in Reading; the analog signal barely reached the Philadelphia suburbs and Lebanon, in the eastern part of the Harrisburg market. As a result, WTVE depended heavily on "must-carry" rules to reach viewers in the Philadelphia market on cable. WTVE at one point had a repeater in Philadelphia on channel 7; that station now operates independently as WWJT-LP.

WTVE had been in Chapter 11 bankruptcy, managed by trustee George Miller until its $13.5-million takeover by WRNN-TV Associates received FCC approval on May 15, 2008. WRNN-TV Associates subsequently sold the station to NRJ TV (a company unrelated to European broadcaster NRJ Radio) in 2011. On June 1, 2016, the station joined the SonLife Broadcasting Network.

On December 9, 2019, it was announced that WRNN-TV Associates, would repurchase WTVE, as well as WPHY-CD and six other full-power TV stations in other markets from NRJ. The sale was approved by the FCC on January 23, and was completed on February 4, 2020, making WTVE and WPHY-CD sister stations to WMCN-TV. Upon completion of the sale, all SonLife programming was dropped and the station now broadcasts infomercials most of the day, along with a simulcast of WRNN's nightly talk show Richard French Live.

== Programming ==
Prior to its switch to SonLife, WTVE's schedule consisted mostly of infomercials and paid religious programs; the station did carry some limited syndicated programming on weekday early evenings. Syndicated programming seen on WTVE included Inside Edition, That '70s Show and Everybody Loves Raymond.

=== Newscasts ===
WTVE aired nightly newscasts from its on-air inception in 1980 until late 1983, when the station switched to a full-time schedule of SelecTV programming. The original news programs were called TV51 Total News and aired weeknights at 5:30 and 10 p.m. Total News was targeted primarily at viewers in Berks and Schuylkill counties in an effort to fill a void in local news coverage for viewers living on the far western edge of the Philadelphia television market. Original WTVE anchors included longtime WEEU radio newsman Bob Smith, Frank Mooney (longtime Reading radio and television personality and "voice" of Boscov's department stores) and sports anchor Ross MacCallum. Later local radio personality and newscaster Suzy Sands joined the station as anchor of the 10 p.m. newscast. Weekend newscasts were anchored by Mike Reinert and Karen Kaye.

At this same time, Jeffrey D. Miller (one-time "Night Mayor" on Reading radio) hosted a late night talk show called NightBeat. Miller also anchored and reported for the nightly news programs. WTVE was also one of the first to air Independent Network News, a nationally syndicated nightly news program produced by WPIX in New York City that was distributed to independent stations, each night at 10:30 p.m. during the 1980s.

Local news programming was re-established on the station in 2000, with the debut of Philly TV News. This program was an attempt to build up the station as a player in the Philadelphia television news arena, but the production failed to attract viewers and was eventually cancelled.

=== Sports programming ===
In the 1980s, WTVE was known for airing high school football games featuring Berks and Schuylkill County schools via tape delay on Saturday evenings. Albright College basketball was also broadcast in a similar manner. The station aired various football games involving Pennsylvania teams. In 2007, WTVE broadcast four Albright College football games; in 2008, the station became an affiliate of the PA Sports Fever network.

== Technical information ==
=== Subchannels ===
Subchannels of WPHY-CD and WTVE
License	Subchannel	Res.	Short name	Programming
WPHY-CD	25.1	480i	WPHY.1	Infomercials
WPHY-CD	25.2	480i	SBN	SonLife
WPHY-CD	25.3	480i	JTV	Jewelry TV
WPHY-CD	44.7	480i	SHOPLC	Shop LC
WTVE	51.1	720p	WTVE.1	Shop LC
WTVE	51.2	480i	INFO	Infomercials
WTVE	51.3	480i	ACE TV	Ace TV
WTVE	51.4	480i	QVC365	QVC 365

WTVE formerly operated a third digital subchannel, which carried VIETV; as of January 18, 2016, only 51.1 and 51.2 are broadcast.

WTVE formerly operated Estrella TV on DT2, but in February 2020, that changed to Timeless TV (public domain shows and infomercials). This channel is seen on some RNN and HC2 Holdings stations. WTVE formerly operated SonLife on DT3; this was later moved to its sharing host WPHY-CD.

=== Analog-to-digital conversion ===
WTVE received authorization by the Federal Communications Commission to terminate its analog signal "no earlier than September 30, 2008" after expressing severe concerns that the existing analog klystron tube transmitter was expected to fail. WTVE shut down its analog signal, over UHF channel 51, on that date. The station's digital signal remained on its pre-transition UHF channel 25, using virtual channel 51.

WTVE was one of the first stations in the U.S. to transmit using a distributed transmission system, having received special temporary authority from the FCC to operate WTVE-DT via eight (mostly low-power) transmitters scattered across its coverage area rather than relying on a singular full-power signal.

The station formerly transmitted with on-channel boosters from sites in or near:

- WTVE-DTS1 Reading, PA (225m 0.76 kW DA)
- WTVE-DTS2 Bethlehem, PA (155m 2.8 kW DA)
- WTVE-DTS3 North East, MD (87m 0.11 kW DA)
- WTVE-DTS4 Quarryville, PA (193m 1.0 kW DA)
- WTVE-DTS5 Myerstown, PA (63m 1.15 kW DA)
- WTVE-DTS6 Lambertville, NJ (95m 0.6 kW DA)
- WTVE-DTS7 Philadelphia, PA (378m 126 kW DA)
- WTVE-DTS8 Brockton, PA (138m 4.25 kW DA)

This pattern effectively created a tailored coverage area corresponding to one large main signal centered on Philadelphia, plus a series of boosters.

== See also ==
- Media in the Lehigh Valley
