= ShopHQ =

American e-commerce retailer and former TV network

- Type: Subsidiary
- Industry: E-commerce; Social commerce
- Founded: 1990; 36 years ago (TV)
- Area served: United States
- Parent: The Arena Group (2025-present)
- Website: shophq.com (launched 1997 as vvtv.com)

ShopHQ
- Country: United States
- Broadcast area: Nationwide
- Headquarters: Eden Prairie, Minnesota, U.S.

Programming
- Language: English
- Picture format: 480i (SDTV); 1080i (HDTV)

Ownership
- Owner: iMedia Brands (Final owner)

History
- Launched: March 12, 1991; 35 years ago
- Closed: April 17, 2025; 15 months ago
- Former names: ValueVision (1991–2001); ShopNBC (2001–2013); Evine Live (2015–2016); Evine (2016–2019)

Links
- Website: shophq.com

ShopHQ is an American e-commerce retailer and digital shopping platform owned by The Arena Group. Formerly known as ValueVision, ShopNBC, and Evine, the brand operated for over 30 years as a multi-channel retailer, consisting of a national home shopping television network and a companion e-commerce website.

The television network ceased broadcasting operations on April 17, 2025, and the website was temporarily taken offline in May 2025 following the bankruptcy of previous parent company iMedia Brands. In October 2025, The Arena Group acquired the brand's intellectual property and customer archives, relaunching ShopHQ as a digital-only retailer focused on social commerce.

== Overview ==
Launched on March 12, 1991, as ValueVision, the television network competed primarily with Qurate Retail Group's HSN and QVC, as well as Jewelry Television. Throughout its broadcast history, the service underwent multiple rebrandings, operating as ShopNBC (2000–2013), Evine (2015–2019), and twice as ShopHQ (2013–2015; 2019–2025).

During its operation as a public company (iMedia Brands), the network managed additional niche brands, including ShopHQ Health (health and wellness) and the Bulldog Shopping Network (men's products). The company was historically headquartered in Eden Prairie, Minnesota and counted Comcast (via NBCUniversal) as a strategic shareholder for over a decade.

In August 2023, the network and its assets were acquired by IV Media, a subsidiary of Innovation Ventures, LLC. Following the closure of the television network in April 2025, the brand transitioned to a digital-only model under The Arena Group.

== History ==
=== Founding, online expansion, and NBC investment (1990–2001) ===
ValueVision Media (VVM) was founded in June 1990. In fiscal year 1997, the company launched its first e-commerce website, vvtv.com. The site utilized webcasting technology to stream the network's live 24-hour programming, allowing users to watch the broadcast online while purchasing merchandise or participating in digital auctions.

In 2000, NBC purchased a significant equity stake in the company. Following this transaction, the television network was renamed ShopNBC in November 2000. The rebranding included a new logo that featured the NBC peacock, though the parent company retained the name ValueVision Media. The website was subsequently rebranded as ShopNBC.com in fiscal year 2001. By 2002, the company reported that e-commerce sales had grown to account for 17% of its total consolidated net sales.

In May 2010, amidst its pending merger with Comcast, NBCUniversal announced plans to sell its stake back to ValueVision Media. However, the company reversed its decision one month later, opting to retain its equity position. The partnership ultimately concluded in June 2013, when ValueVision repurchased NBCUniversal's 37% stake in the company, aiming to reduce licensing fees and establish an independent brand identity.

With the licensing rights to the NBC name expiring, the network was rebranded as ShopHQ in 2014. Later that year, the hedge fund Clinton Group won a proxy battle to install new management, who shifted the network's strategy to feature more celebrity-driven content, such as Mark Cuban's American Dream.

=== Evine ===
On February 13, 2015, the ShopHQ network was rebranded as EVINE Live, following ValueVision Media's acquisition of e-commerce company Dollars Per Minute, the owner of the EVINE trademark, in order to distance itself from the reputation it held under its previous brandings, ValueVision, ShopNBC, and ShopHQ.

The network hired former QVC host Kathy Levine and featured merchandise branded under different reality television stars, including Lisa Vanderpump and Luann de Lesseps. It also premiered concepts from other well-known celebrities, including Paula Deen, Vanessa Williams, Nancy O'Dell, Holly Robinson Peete, Karen Fairchild, Terry Dubrow, Heather Dubrow, Todd English, Donny Osmond, and Bob Vila. It also sold products on its e-commerce website, Evine.com.

EVINE Live launched a high definition feed of the channel in 1080i (including the acquisition of HD tier channel slots under new carriage agreements) the same year, but until September 2017, remained in standard definition, merely rebroadcasting the SD feed. The network converted to an upscaled standard definition widescreen presentation in the fall of 2016, and quietly upgraded to HD a year after.

In July 2016, EVINE removed "Live" from their on-air name.

=== Return to ShopHQ ===
On July 17, 2019, Evine Live Inc. began doing business under the new corporate banner of iMedia Brands Inc, with their shares traded under a new ticker of IMBI; Invicta Watch Group (which has a number of hours on the network as its largest vendor) invested an additional $6 million into the company.

The network rebranded as ShopHQ on August 21, as market research suggested the "E" name was being confused for an entertainment news brand such as E! or Entertainment Tonight.

IMBI announced plans to launch a Spanish-speaking shopping channel called LaVenta Shopping Network, along with the male-focused Bulldog Shopping Network, itself a rebranding of EVINE TOO, a timeshift channel with only minimum cable distribution.

Though the channel slot for Bulldog Shopping Network was activated in the spring of 2020, its focus quickly changed due to the COVID-19 pandemic. ShopHQ Health, which sold health and wellness products including surgical masks, launched within weeks of the pandemic, and became its new official branding on September 1.

Bulldog relaunched in June 2021, but was discontinued on most providers at the end of December, after the network's satellite lease with Olympus expired. It was replaced with Kenneth Copeland's Victory Channel.

Some of ShopHQ Health's cable carriage was discontinued at the end of May 2022, and was replaced by QVC3; both properties continue streaming online and feature some over-the-air carriage.

=== Sale to Innovation Ventures, LLC, and bankruptcy ===
After filing for Chapter 11 bankruptcy on June 28, 2023, the channel's parent company, iMedia Brands, said on July 10 that it could sell its assets to RNN Media Group for $50 million, in a deal scheduled to close in August. This deal was eventually unsuccessful and in 2023, the company was instead sold to IV Media's Manoj Bhargava, founder and CEO of 5-hour Energy, and owner of NewsNet.

In the months after, both ShopHQ Health and Bulldog's programming were merged into the ShopHQ schedule, and the network's new management began to pursue an alternative model of increasing their live shopping presence through online platforms such as Instagram and TikTok. This was part of a broader shift from traditional television models that was also reflected in Bhargava's closure of NewsNet in August 2024. ShopHQ's cable and satellite carriage has begun to be discontinued with the change, as Optimum and DirecTV removed the channel on their systems on February 1, 2025, with Spectrum, their largest presence, following on April 1 as ShopHQ refused to provide further programming.

On April 17, 2025, the network's operations abruptly shut down mid-day on all platforms, including YouTube, with news of further layoffs from the network confirmed in the next few days after. After a clearance sale was completed on the website, by the second weekend of May it had been entirely replaced with an image claiming it was "under maintenance", and the network's website was completely shut down by July.

=== Acquisition by The Arena Group (2025–present) ===
On October 17, 2025, The Arena Group acquired the intellectual property and customer database of ShopHQ from IV Media. The transaction transferred the brand to The Arena Group, in which Manoj Bhargava—who had previously backed IV Media—holds a majority stake.

Under this new ownership, ShopHQ discontinued the owned-inventory model of its television predecessor in favor of a drop shipping model to reduce overhead. The platform now focuses on "creator-led social selling," distributing video content across social media channels like TikTok and YouTube. Jessica Gregory, formerly Vice President of Marketing for the network, was appointed General Manager of the relaunched platform.

== Former logos ==
Logo for when the network was known as ShopNBC (2000–2013). It is based on the 1986 NBC logo.

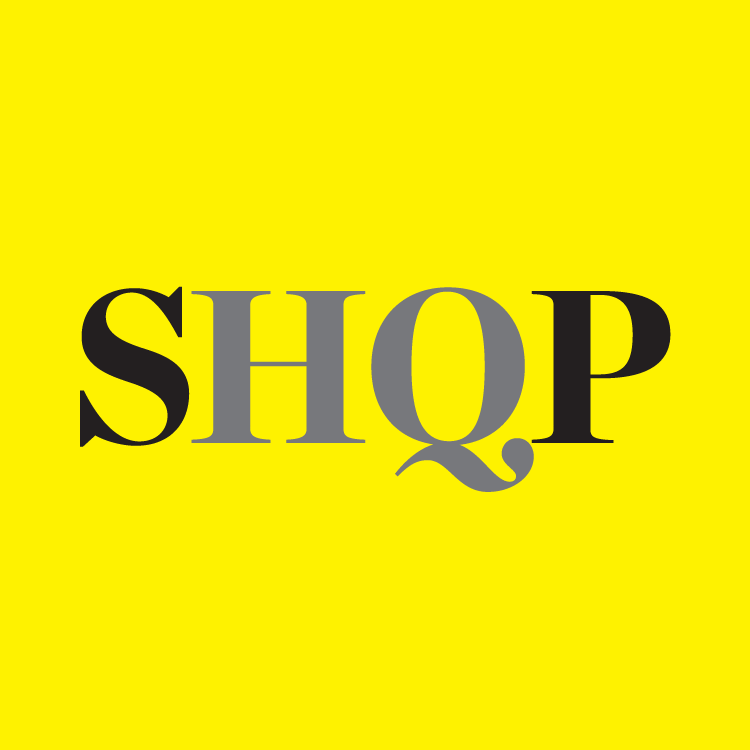
Logo from the network's first ShopHQ iteration (2013–2015).

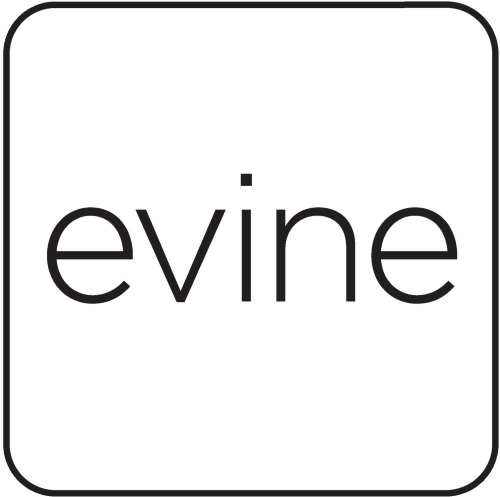
Evine logo (2015–2019).

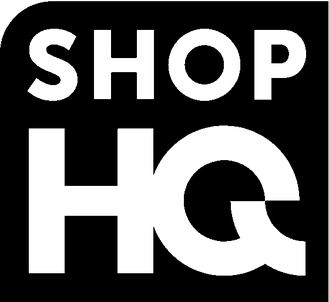
ShopHQ logo (2019–2023).

ShopHQ logo (2023–2025).
